= List of FC Politehnica Timisoara seasons =

== Key ==
Key to national competitions:

- Liga I, Divizia A = 1st Romanian League
- Liga II, Divizia B = 2nd Romanian League
- City Championship = City league (temporary, post-war)
- District Championship I = 1st District League
- District Championship II = 2nd District League

Key to league:

- Pos. = Final position
- Pl. = Played
- W = Games won
- D = Games drawn
- L = Games lost
- GF = Goals scored
- GA = Goals against
- Pts = Points

Key to rounds:

- C = Champion
- F = Final (Runner-up)
- SF = Semi-finals
- QF = Quarter-finals
- R16/R32 = Round of 16, round of 32, etc.
- 3R = Third round
- GS = Group stage

Champions	Runners-up

== Seasons ==
=== Pre-war era ===
Romania did not have a national football league until the 1932–1933 season. It was organized in District Championships and the winners of the District Championships I took part in a national play-off to determine the champion. During this time, Politehnica only played at the district level and the second and third leagues, when they latter two were intermittently organized before the war.

Season	Club name	Competition									Cupa României	Coach
Season	Club name	Division	Pos	Pl.	W	D	L	GF	GA	Pts	Cupa României	Coach
1921–22	Politehnica Timișoara	District Championship II										
1922–23	Politehnica Timișoara	District Championship II										
1923–24	Politehnica Timișoara	District Championship II										
1924–25	Politehnica Timișoara	District Championship I	4th	14				19	20	14		
1925–26	Politehnica Timișoara	District Championship I	7th									
1926–27	Politehnica Timișoara	District Championship I	2nd	14				37	13	23		
1927–28	Politehnica Timișoara	District Championship I	4th					27	22			
1928–29	Politehnica Timișoara	District Championship I										
1929–30	Politehnica Timișoara	District Championship I	7th									
1930–31	Politehnica Timișoara	District Championship I	4th									
1931–32	Politehnica Timișoara	Did not compete due to insufficient material resources										
1932–33	Politehnica Timișoara	Did not compete due to insufficient material resources										
1933–34	Politehnica Timișoara	Did not compete due to insufficient material resources										
1934–35	Politehnica Timișoara	District Championship I	5th					33	28	18		
1935–36	Politehnica Timișoara	District Championship I	6th					34	35	17		
1936–37	Politehnica Timișoara	Divizia C	10th							4		Tabacu
1937–38	Politehnica Timișoara	Divizia C	8th							8		
1938–39	Politehnica Timișoara	District Championship I	9th					36	47	17		
1939–40	Politehnica Timișoara	District Championship I	5th					60	36	29		
1940–41	Politehnica Timișoara	Divizia B	9th	18	4	1	13	31	54	9		
1941–42	Politehnica Timișoara	II World War										
1942–43	Politehnica Timișoara	II World War										
1943–44	Politehnica Timișoara	II World War										
1944–45	Politehnica Timișoara	II World War										
1945–46	Politehnica Timișoara	City Championship	1st	14	11	1	2	48	14	23		Bürger

=== Post-war era ===
With an establish national football league, Politehnica were selected to start in the second tier (Divizia B at the time). Since then, the club has never played in a lower league, in spite of being officially relegated twice, in 2000 and 2002 – first saved after a place swap with Dacia Pitesti and then as AEK Bucuresti was moved to Timișoara and renamed Politehnica AEK. After the club went bankrupt and was dissolved in 2012, another second league club, AC Recaș, was moved to Timișoara to offer continuity to Politehnica, resulting in ACS Poli Timișoara. At the same time, the supporters decided to create a phoenix club, under the name of ASU Politehnica Timișoara. However, ACS Poli is credited as the official record holder and legal successor of the original club founded in 1921, FC Politehnica Timișoara. It is co-owned by the City Council and the County Council and has the backing of the Politehnica University of Timișoara, all three being active members in the legal entity running the club. Poli Timișoara is a Romanian football club established in 1921.

Season	Club name	League									Cupa României	Cupa Ligii	Europe / South America		Coach
Season	Club name	Division	Pos	Pl.	W	D	L	GF	GA	Pts	Cupa României	Cupa Ligii	Europe / South America		Coach
1946–47	Politehnica Timișoara	Divizia B	2nd	26	17	5	4	79	27	39					Bürger
1947–48	Politehnica Timișoara	Divizia B	1st	28	22	1	5	70	21	45	-				Carte
1948–49	CSU Timișoara	Divizia A	10th	26	11	3	12	47	45	25	R16				Carte
1950	Știința Timișoara	Divizia A	3rd	22	9	7	6	30	37	25	R32				Bürger/Beke
1951	Știința Timișoara	Divizia A	12th	22	5	6	11	20	34	16	SF				
1952	Știința Timișoara	Divizia B	1st							35	R32				
1953	Știința Timișoara	Divizia A	6th	21	6	8	7	19	22	20	QF				? – Mladin
1954	Știința Timișoara	Divizia A	6th	26	5	17	4	34	27	27	R32				Mladin
1955	Știința Timișoara	Divizia A	4th	24	10	7	7	47	30	27	R32				Deheleanu – Bindea – Mladin
1956	Știința Timișoara	Divizia A	3rd	24	11	7	6	40	31	29	R32				Mladin – Stepan
1957–58	Știința Timișoara	Divizia A	3rd	22	11	5	6	49	38	27	C				Woroncowschi
1958–59	Știința Timișoara	Divizia A	12th	22	5	5	12	25	44	15	R32				Schileru – Deheleanu
1959–60	Știința Timișoara	Divizia B	1st	26	17	4	5	60	20	38	SF				Bindea
1960–61	Știința Timișoara	Divizia A	10th	26	9	7	10	45	49	25	QF				Bindea/Mladin – Reuter/Bindea
1961–62	Știința Timișoara	Divizia A	8th	26	10	5	11	38	42	25	R16				Reuter/Godeanu
1962–63	Știința Timișoara	Divizia A	3rd	27	11	7	9	4	39	29	QF				Braun/Reuter/Godeanu
1963–64	Știința Timișoara	Divizia A	13th	26	8	6	12	31	42	22	QF				Reuter/Mazăre – Bindea – Vîlcov/Zeană
1964–65	Știința Timișoara	Divizia B	1st	26	14	5	7	41	25	33	-				Ionescu-Woroncowschi
1965–66	Politehnica Timișoara	Divizia A	11th	26	10	3	13	26	36	23	R32				Woroncowschi
1966–67	Politehnica Timișoara	Divizia A	14th	26	6	7	13	33	45	19	R16				Ionescu/Reuter
1967–68	Politehnica Timișoara	Divizia B	6th							25	R16				Godeanu
1968–69	Politehnica Timișoara	Divizia B	6th							32	-				Zeană – Drăghiescu
1969–70	Politehnica Timișoara	Divizia B	4th							34	R32				Drăghiescu – Jurcă
1970–71	Politehnica Timișoara	Divizia B	2nd	30	16	10	4	48	22	42	QF				Jurcă/Godeanu
1971–72	Politehnica Timișoara	Divizia B	-								QF				
1972–73	Politehnica Timișoara	Divizia B	1st								-				Ionescu
1973–74	Politehnica Timișoara	Divizia A	7th	34	12	10	12	41	45	34	F				Ionescu
1974–75	Politehnica Timișoara	Divizia A	11th	34	13	7	14	32	40	33	R16				Ionescu
1975–76	Politehnica Timișoara	Divizia A	5th	34	14	9	11	54	52	37	R16				Rădulescu
1976–77	Politehnica Timișoara	Divizia A	6th	34	16	4	14	44	37	36	R32				
1977–78	Politehnica Timișoara	Divizia A	3rd	34	16	6	12	48	38	38	R16				Niculescu
1978–79	Politehnica Timișoara	Divizia A	11th	34	13	5	16	35	37	31	QF		UC	Second round	Niculescu
1979–80	Politehnica Timișoara	Divizia A	10th	34	15	3	16	47	50	33	C				Rădulescu – Ionescu
1980–81	Politehnica Timișoara	Divizia A	12th	34	13	7	14	33	46	33	F		ECWC	Second round	Ionescu
1981–82	Politehnica Timișoara	Divizia A	11th	34	12	8	14	40	41	32	R64		UC	Preliminary Round	Ionescu
1982–83	Politehnica Timișoara	Divizia A	17th	34	9	6	19	35	64	24	F				Ionescu
1983–84	Politehnica Timișoara	Divizia B	1st								-				
1984–85	Politehnica Timișoara	Divizia A	9th	34	12	8	14	35	52	32	R32				
1985–86	Politehnica Timișoara	Divizia A	16th	34	11	5	18	48	56	27	R32				
1986–87	Politehnica Timișoara	Divizia B	1st								-				Ionescu
1987–88	Politehnica Timișoara	Divizia A	16th	34	10	6	18	35	53	26	R32				Ionescu
1988–89	Politehnica Timișoara	Divizia B	1st								-				Rădulescu
1989–90	Politehnica Timișoara	Divizia A	5th	34	17	7	10	65	40	41	QF				Rădulescu
1990–91	Politehnica Timișoara	Divizia A	6th	34	14	7	13	45	45	35	R16		UC	Second round	Rădulescu – Ionescu
1991–92	Politehnica Timișoara	Divizia A	5th	34	15	9	10	36	34	39	F				Ionescu
1992–93	Politehnica Timișoara	Divizia A	13th	34	8	13	13	34	46	29	R32		UC	First round	
1993–94	Politehnica Timișoara	Divizia A	17th	34	11	6	17	39	53	28	R32				
1994–95	Politehnica Timișoara	Divizia B	1st								R32				Rădulescu
1995–96	Politehnica Timișoara	Divizia A	7th	34	14	7	13	58	47	49	R32				Rădulescu
1996–97	Politehnica Timișoara	Divizia A	17th	34	10	5	19	45	65	35	R16				Dembrovschi – Chimiuc – Șunda
1997–98	Politehnica Timișoara	Divizia B	15th	34	11	6	17	33	44	39	R32				
1998–99	Politehnica Timișoara	Divizia B	5th	34	16	4	14	60	41	52	-				Rotariu
1999–00	Politehnica Timișoara	Divizia B	15th	34	12	6	16	50	54	42	-				Dembrovschi
2000–01	Politehnica Timișoara	Divizia B	8th	30	13	3	4	43	35	42	-				
2001–02	Politehnica Timișoara	Divizia B	16th	30	1	4	25	15	105	-8 (Note: The club was deducted 15 points for failing to pay one of its player's wages, Ciprian Colda)	R32				
2002–03	Politehnica AEK Timișoara	Divizia A	14th	30	11	2	17	37	52	35	R32				Panduru – Gherman – Mulțescu
2003–04	Politehnica AEK Timișoara	Divizia A	8th	30	9	12	9	30	40	39	QF				Vișan – Panduru
2004–05	Politehnica Timișoara	Divizia A	6th	30	13	6	11	37	34	45	R32				Dumitriu – Zanc^{(C)} – Mulțescu – Olăroiu
2005–06	Politehnica 1921 Știința Timișoara	Divizia A	8th	30	10	10	10	34	31	40	QF				Olăroiu – Hagi – Rotariu^{(C)}
2006–07	Politehnica 1921 Știința Timișoara	Liga I	6th	34	15	8	11	37	33	53	F				Cârțu – Artimon – Rotariu^{(C)} – Velcea
2007–08	FC Timișoara	Liga I	6th	34	16	9	9	57	44	57	R16				Uhrin Jr.
2008–09	FC Timișoara	Liga I	2nd	34	20	7	7	58	38	67	F		UC	First round	Uhrin Jr. – Balint
2009–10	FC Timișoara	Liga I	5th	34	15	14	5	55	27	59	R16		UCL	Play-off round	Sabău
2009–10	FC Timișoara	Liga I	5th	34	15	14	5	55	27	59	R16		UEL	4th Group A	Sabău
2010–11	FC Timișoara	Liga I	2nd	34	17	15	2	63	38	66	QF		UEL	Play-off round	Petrovic – Contra – Uhrin Jr.
2011–12	Politehnica Timișoara	Liga II	1st	30	19	8	3	54	19	65	QF				Velcea
2012–13	ACS Poli Timișoara	Liga II	2nd	24	12	9	3	39	19	45	R128				Velcea
2013–14	ACS Poli Timișoara	Liga I	16th	34	10	8	16	26	42	38	R16				Velcea – Șunda – Alexa
2014–15	ACS Poli Timișoara	Liga II	1st	30	19	9	2	52	11	66	R64				Alexa
2015–16	ACS Poli Timișoara	Liga I	11th	26	5	10	11	24	35	25	QF	QF			Alexa – Marin – Grigoraș – Popa
2015–16	ACS Poli Timișoara	Play-out	13th	14	1	4	9	14	36	20	QF	QF			Alexa – Marin – Grigoraș – Popa
2016–17	ACS Poli Timișoara	Liga I	13th	26	7	7	12	25	42	14 (Note: The club started the season with a 14 point penalty deduction.)	SF	F			Popa
2016–17	ACS Poli Timișoara	Play-out	12th	14	5	5	4	16	14	27	SF	F			Popa
2017–18	ACS Poli Timişoara	Liga I	11th	26	6	9	11	22	37	27	R32				Popa – Grozavu – Neaga
2017–18	ACS Poli Timişoara	Play-out	13th	14	3	4	7	10	16	27	R32				Popa – Grozavu – Neaga
2018-19	ACS Poli Timişoara	Liga II	18th	38	7	8	23	31	67	29	R64				Ganea – Nanu – Cojocaru – Răchită
2019-20	ACS Poli Timişoara	Liga III	14th	16	4	2	10	17	35	14	R128				Velcotă - Bălace
