= Gabriel Zahiu =

Romanian footballer (1956–2023)

Personal information
- Date of birth: 17 November 1956
- Place of birth: Buzău, Romania
- Date of death: 20 November 2023 (aged 67)
- Place of death: Helsingborg, Sweden
- Positions: Midfielder; central defender

Senior career*
Years	Team	Apps	(Gls)
1973–1975	Gloria Buzău	46	(1)
1975–1981	Steaua București	120	(31)
1981–1987	Gloria Buzău	88	(32)
1987	Örebro		
Total		254	(64)
- * Club domestic league appearances and goals

Gabriel Zahiu (17 November 1956 – 20 November 2023) was a Romanian footballer who played as a midfielder.

== Career ==
Zahiu was born on 17 November 1956 in Buzău, Romania and began playing football in 1973 at local club Gloria in Divizia B. In 1975 he joined Steaua București, making his Divizia A debut on 17 August 1975 under coach Emerich Jenei in a 2–1 away loss to FCM Reșița. By the first season, he helped the club win The Double, being used by Jenei in nine league games, but did not play in the 2–1 win over CSU Galați in the Cupa României final. In the following season he reached another Cupa României final, Jenei sending him in the 72nd minute to replace Radu Troi in the 2–1 loss to Universitatea Craiova. In the 1977–78 season, Zahiu had a prolific period as he scored 12 goals in the 22 league games that Jenei used him, being the team's second top-scorer, having seven fewer then Anghel Iordănescu, helping the club win another title. In the next two seasons, he reached two more Cupa României finals. In the first of these, he did not appear in the 3–0 win over Sportul Studențesc București. In the 1980 final, coach Gheorghe Constantin sent him in the 65th minute to replace Marcel Răducanu, but they lost 2–1 to Politehnica Timișoara. In his six-season spell with The Military Men he also played seven matches in European competitions, scoring one goal in a 6–0 win over Young Boys in the 1979–80 European Cup Winners' Cup. In 1981 he returned to Gloria Buzău in Divizia B, where in the 1983–84 season he scored a personal record of 15 goals which helped the team gain promotion to the first league. On 2 November 1986 he made his last Divizia A appearance in a 2–1 home win against Corvinul Hunedoara, totaling 135 games with 32 goals in the competition. In 1987 at age 31, Zahiu left communist Romania legally to settle in Sweden, and played for a short while for Örebro, before ending his career.

== Death ==
Zahiu died on 20 November 2023 in Helsingborg, Sweden, three days after he turned 67.

== Honours ==
Steaua București

- Divizia A: 1975–76, 1977–78
- Cupa României: 1975–76, 1978–79, runner-up 1976–77, 1979–80

Gloria Buzău

- Divizia B: 1983–84
