= Ștefan Sameș =

Romanian footballer and manager

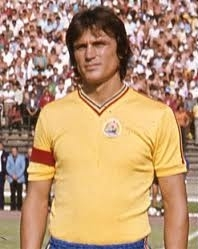
- Sameș with Romania

Personal information
- Date of birth: 14 October 1951
- Place of birth: Dobroești, Romania
- Date of death: 17 July 2011 (aged 59)
- Place of death: Bucharest, Romania
- Height: 1.82 m (5 ft 11 1/2 in)
- Position: Centre-back

Youth career
- 1965–1971: Steaua București

Senior career*
Years	Team	Apps	(Gls)
1971–1982	Steaua București	274	(20)
1971–1973	→ Universitatea Craiova (loan)	46	(0)
1982–1983	FC Constanța	9	(1)
1983–1985	Rapid București	58	(0)
1986–1987	ROVA Roșiori		
1988–1989	Siretul Pașcani		
Total		387	(21)

International career
1975–1980	Romania Olympic	3	(0)
1973–1982	Romania	46	(3)

Managerial career
- 1990: Universitatea Cluj
- 1992–2011: Steaua București (youth)
- * Club domestic league appearances and goals

Ștefan Sameș (14 October 1951 – 17 July 2011) was a Romanian professional football player and manager.

== Club career ==
"Ștefan was a special man and a devoted and strong footballer. When he shot at the goal, he would make the ball go oval, like the one at rugby."

— Marcel Răducanu, former Steaua teammate

Sameș was born on 14 October 1951 in Dobroești, Romania and began playing football in 1965 at age 14 for the youth side of Steaua București. In 1971, he was loaned to Universitatea Craiova where he started his senior career, making his Divizia A debut on 28 November under coach Constantin Cernăianu in a 1–1 draw against Petrolul Ploiești.

After two seasons spent at "U" Craiova, Sameș returned to Steaua. There, in the 1975–76 season he helped the club win The Double, being used by coach Emerich Jenei in 31 league games in which he scored once, also appearing the full 90 minutes in the 2–1 win over CSU Galați in the Cupa României final. In the following season he reached another Cupa României final, Jenei using him the entire match in the eventual 2–1 loss to his former club, Universitatea Craiova. In the 1977–78 season, Sameș scored one goal in the 21 league games that Jenei used him, helping the club win another title. In the next two seasons, he reached two more Cupa României finals, with coach Gheorghe Constantin utilizing him for the full duration of both matches. The first one was a 3–0 win over Sportul Studențesc București and in the 1980 final, the team lost with 2–1 to Politehnica Timișoara. In his ten-season spell with The Military Men he also played 12 matches in European competitions, scoring two goals in a 6–0 win over Young Boys in the 1979–80 European Cup Winners' Cup. For the way he played in 1979, Sameș was placed first in the ranking for the Romanian Footballer of the Year award.

In the middle of the 1982–83 season, Sameș joined FC Constanța where he was teammates with a young Gheorghe Hagi. However, the spell was unsuccessful as the team was relegated to Divizia B at the end of the season. He switched teams again, going to play for Rapid București where on 27 October 1985 in a 1–0 away loss to Sportul Studențesc he made his last appearance in Divizia A, totaling 388 games with 21 goals in the competition. Sameș ended his career in 1989 after playing several seasons in Divizia B for ROVA Roșiori and Siretul Pașcani.

== International career ==
Sameș played 46 matches and scored three goals for Romania, making his debut on 18 April 1973 under coach Valentin Stănescu in a 2–0 friendly loss to the Soviet Union. His following game was Romania's biggest ever victory, a 9–0 win against Finland in the 1974 World Cup qualifiers. He played in all four games during the 1978 World Cup qualifiers which included two wins and two losses against Spain and Yugoslavia. Sameș then played in five games in the Euro 1980 qualifiers in which he scored a double in a 3–2 win over Yugoslavia and also captained The Tricolours for the first time in a 2–0 victory against Cyprus. He also captained Romania in both legs of the 4–3 aggregate victory against Yugoslavia in the 1977–80 Balkan Cup final. In the following years he played six matches during the 1982 World Cup qualifiers which included a 2–1 victory and a 0–0 draw against England. Sameș made his last appearance for the national team in an away friendly against East Germany which took place on 17 November 1982, a match they lost 4–1.

He also played for Romania's Olympic team.

=== International goals ===
Scores and results list Romania's goal tally first, score column indicates score after each Sameș goal.

List of international goals scored by Ștefan Sameș
#	Date	Venue	Opponent	Score	Result	Competition
1	4 December 1974	Bloomfield Stadium, Tel Aviv, Israel	Israel	1–0	1–0	Friendly
2	25 October 1978	Stadionul Steaua, Bucharest, Romania	Yugoslavia	1–1	3–2	Euro 1980 qualifiers
3	25 October 1978	Stadionul Steaua, Bucharest, Romania	Yugoslavia	2–1	3–2	Euro 1980 qualifiers

== Coaching career ==
After he ended his career, Sameș had a spell as head coach at Universitatea Cluj for the final rounds of the 1989–90 Divizia A season, helping the team finish in 13th place.

Afterwards he coached at Steaua's youth academy from 1992 until 2011.

== Personal life and death ==
Sameș had two siblings, Petruța and Gheorghiță. Two-time Champions League winner Miodrag Belodedici claimed that Sameș was his childhood idol, the two being teammates for a short while at Steaua. In the early 1980s, his wife, son and father-in-law fled illegally from Romania's communist regime to West Germany for which he was kicked out from Steaua, even though he was the team's captain.

Sameș descended from the Bulgarian population in Dudești-Cioplea and at one point had the nickname "The Bulgarian".

On 17 July 2011, Sameș died in a Bucharest hospital at the age of 59 after suffering from cancer.

== Honours ==
=== Player ===
Steaua București

- Divizia A: 1975–76, 1977–78
- Cupa României: 1975–76, 1978–79, runner-up 1976–77, 1979–80

Romania

- Balkan Cup: 1977–80

=== Individual ===
- Romanian Footballer of the Year: 1979
