= 1977 Cupa României final =

- Event: 1976–77 Cupa României
Universitatea Craiova	Steaua București
2	1
- Date: 3 July 1977
- Venue: Republicii, Bucharest
- Referee: Ioan Igna (Timișoara)

The 1977 Cupa României final was the 39th final of Romania's most prestigious football cup competition. It was disputed between Universitatea Craiova and Steaua București, and was won by Universitatea Craiova after a game with 3 goals. It was the first cup for Universitatea Craiova.

== Match details ==
3 July 1977
17:15 EET

Universitatea Craiova	2–1	Steaua București
Balaci 50'; Cârțu 64'	Report	Marin 78'

Republicii, Bucharest
Attendance: 30,000
Referee: Ioan Igna (Timișoara)

GK	1.	(Romania) Gabriel Boldici
DF	2.	(Romania) Cornel Berneanu
DF	3.	(Romania) Nicolae Tilihoi
DF	6.	(Romania) Costică Ştefănescu
DF	4.	(Romania) Petre Purima
MF	5.	(Romania) Costică Donose
MF	8.	(Romania) Ilie Balaci
MF	10.	(Romania) Aurel Beldeanu
FW	7.	(Romania) Zoltan Crişan (substituted off) 85'
FW	9.	(Romania) Sorin Cârţu
FW	11.	(Romania) Dumitru Marcu (substituted off) 46'
Substitutions:
FW		(Romania) Rodion Cămătaru (substituted in) 46'
DF		(Romania) Nicolae Negrilă (substituted in) 85'
Manager:
(Romania) Constantin Deliu

GK	1.	(Romania) Dumitru Moraru
DF	2.	(Romania) Teodor Anghelini
DF	6.	(Romania) Ştefan Sameş
DF	3.	(Romania) Florin Marin
DF	4,	(Romania) Iosif Vigu
MF	5.	(Romania) Ion Ion
MF	10.	(Romania) Ion Dumitru (substituted off) 59'
MF	11.	(Romania) Constantin Zamfir
FW	7.	(Romania) Radu Troi (substituted off) 72'
FW	8.	(Romania) Viorel Năstase
FW	9.	(Romania) Anghel Iordănescu
Substitutions:
MF		(Romania) Vasile Aelenei (substituted in) 59'
FW		(Romania) Gabriel Zahiu (substituted in) 72'
Manager:
(Romania) Emerich Jenei

== See also ==
- List of Cupa României finals
