= Teodor Anghelini =

Romanian footballer and coach

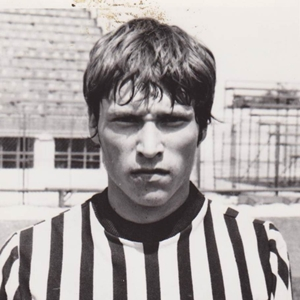
- Anghelini with Steagul Roșu Brașov in the 1970s

Personal information
- Date of birth: 9 March 1954 (age 72)
- Place of birth: Brașov, Romania
- Height: 1.78 m (5 ft 10 in)
- Position: Defender

Youth career
- 1968–1971: Steagul Roșu Brașov

Senior career*
Years	Team	Apps	(Gls)
1971–1974	Steagul Roșu Brașov	70	(2)
1974–1983	Steaua București	264	(1)
1983–1985	ASA Mizil		
Total		334	(3)

International career
	Romania U21	4	(0)
	Romania U23	6	(0)
1975–1976	Romania Olympic	3	(0)
1974–1979	Romania	22	(0)

Managerial career
- 1992: Steaua București (assistant)
- 2004: CS Mogoșoaia
- 2007: Aversa
- * Club domestic league appearances and goals

Teodor Anghelini (born 9 March 1954) is a retired Romanian footballer and current youth coach.

Anghelini, who is of Italian descent, played for hometown club Steagul Roșu Brașov between 1971 and 1974, before joining Steaua București, where he spent 10 seasons, winning two league titles and two Romanian Cups.

== Club career ==
Anghelini, nicknamed "Briceagul Sicilian" (The Sicilian Penknife) by writer Fănuș Neagu, was born in March 1954 in Brașov, Romania and began playing junior-level football at local club Steagul Roșu in 1968. He made his Divizia A debut on 3 May 1972, aged 18 under the guidance of coach Nicolae Proca in Steagul's 2–0 away loss to UTA Arad. In the following two seasons, Anghelini appeared in all the league games except one. He also scored two goals in his last season, including one in a 1–0 win over FC Constanța which helped Steagul finish in third place and earn qualification for the UEFA Cup.

In 1974, Anghelini joined Steaua București where in his second season he helped the club win The Double, being used by coach Emerich Jenei in 30 league games, also appearing in the 1–0 win over CSU Galați in the Cupa României final. In the following season he reached another Cupa României final, Jenei using him the entire match in the eventual 2–1 loss to Universitatea Craiova. In the 1977–78 season, Anghelini was used in 32 league games by Jenei, helping the club win another title. In the next two seasons, under coach Gheorghe Constantin he reached two more Cupa României finals, playing all the minutes in both, the first one ending with a 3–0 win over Sportul Studențesc București and the one in 1980 with a 2–1 loss to Politehnica Timișoara. On 29 October 1983, Angelini made his last Divizia A appearance, playing for Steaua in a 1–0 home victory against Jiul Petroșani, totaling 334 matches with three goals in the competition and 12 games in European competitions. In 1983 he went to play for ASA Mizil in the third league, helping it gain promotion to the second one where he retired in 1985.

== International career ==
Anghelini played 22 matches for Romania, making his debut under coach Valentin Stănescu on 23 March 1974 in a 1–0 friendly loss to France. He played six games in the Euro 1976 qualifiers and one during the Euro 1980 qualifiers. Anghelini made his last appearance for the national team on 29 August 1979 in a friendly against Poland that ended in a 3–0 loss.

== Coaching career ==
After he ended his career, Anghelini worked as a youth coach for Steaua București. He also coached senior teams such as Ceahlăul Piatra Neamț, Steaua Mizil, FC Câmpina, FC Predeal, FC Călărași, Aversa and CS Mogoșoaia in the Romanian lower leagues, and he was for a while an assistant for Victor Pițurcă at Steaua.

== Honours ==
Steaua București

- Divizia A: 1975–76, 1977–78
- Cupa României: 1975–76, 1978–79, runner-up 1976–77, 1979–80

ASA Mizil

- Divizia C: 1983–84
