= Viorel Năstase =

Romanian footballer

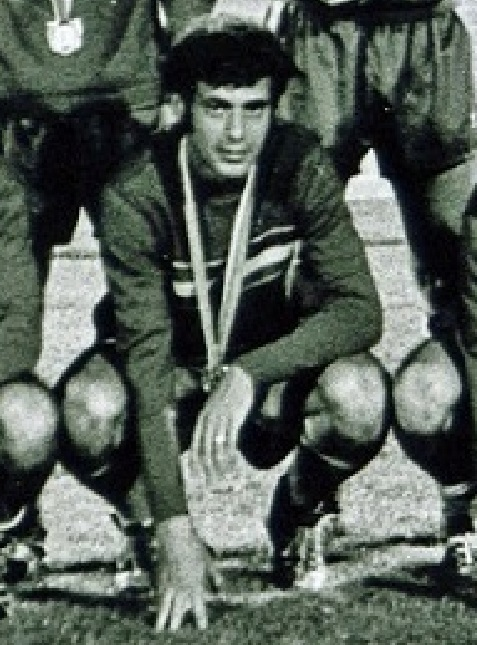
- Năstase Divizia A champion with Steaua București in 1978

Personal information
- Date of birth: 7 October 1953 (age 73)
- Place of birth: București, Romania
- Height: 1.79 m (5 ft 10 in)
- Position: Forward

Youth career
- Progresul București

Senior career*
Years	Team	Apps	(Gls)
1969–1971	Progresul București	18	(9)
1971–1979	Steaua București	177	(77)
1980–1981	1860 Munich	25	(15)
1981–1984	Catanzaro	31	(3)
1984–1985	SV Salzburg	3	(0)
Total		254	(104)

International career
1971	Romania Olympic	1	(0)
1971–1976	Romania U23	15	(7)
1973	Romania U21	1	(0)
1976	Romania B	1	(0)
1976	Romania	1	(0)
- * Club domestic league appearances and goals

Viorel Năstase (born 7 October 1953) is a Romanian former professional footballer who played as a forward.

== Club career ==
=== Progresul București ===
Năstase was born on 7 October 1953 in București, Romania. He began playing football in the 1969–70 Divizia B season for Progresul București, helping the team finish first and gain promotion to the first league. In the following season he made his Divizia A debut on 27 September 1970 under coach Victor Stănculescu in a 2–1 away loss to Farul Constanța. He scored a total of nine goals until the end of the season, partnering with Mircea Sandu in the team's offense, but Progresul was relegated back to the second league.

=== Steaua București ===
Afterwards, Năstase joined Steaua București for eight seasons. He took part in the club's 1971–72 European Cup Winners' Cup campaign, playing five games as the team reached the quarter-finals by eliminating Hibernians and Barcelona, scoring three goals against the latter, being eliminated after 1–1 on aggregate on the away goal rule by Bayern Munich. Năstase won two league titles with The Military Men in the 1975–76 and 1977–78 seasons. He was used by coach Emerich Jenei in 21 matches in which he scored four goals in the first season and in 12 games with six goals in the second. He also helped Steaua win two Cupa României, but played only in the 1976 final when Jenei sent him in the 63rd minute to replace Marcel Răducanu in the 1–0 win over CSU Galați. In the first round of the 1977–78 UEFA Cup, he scored once again against Barcelona, but the game ended in a 5–1 loss. During these years, Năstase also netted three goals in two derby draws against Dinamo București. On 15 September 1979, he made his last Divizia A appearance in a 2–1 away loss to Chimia Râmnicu Vâlcea, totaling 193 matches with 86 goals in the competition. Năstase defected from Romania's communist regime to Switzerland where he asked for political asylum in 1979 after a game between Steaua and Young Boys Bern in the 1979–80 European Cup Winners' Cup.

=== 1860 Munich ===
After being suspended for one year from playing football, which was a rule for players who defect from the Eastern Bloc to the West, Năstase went to play in West Germany at 1860 Munich. Coach Carl-Heinz Rühl wanted to throw him out of the team before the start of the season because of his drunken escapades in bars. He eventually made his Bundesliga debut on 2 September 1980 as Rühl used him the entire match in a 3–2 away loss to 1. FC Kaiserslautern. Năstase netted his first goal on 13 September in a 2–1 away loss to Eintracht Frankfurt, then one month later he scored once in a 3–1 defeat in the Munich derby against Bayern Munich. He would also score a hat-trick in a victory against Bayer Uerdingen and two doubles in a win over Schalke 04 and a loss to Arminia Bielefeld. He was the team's top-scorer in the 1980–81 season with 14 goals in 23 matches, partnering in the offense with Rudi Völler. However, in the 33rd round of the season, Năstase missed a penalty in a 0–0 draw against Hamburg, then in the following round he scored a goal in a 7–2 loss to Karlsruher SC after which the club was relegated. In the same season he netted five goals in a 8–0 win over SG 05 Pirmasens in the first round of the 1980–81 DFB-Pokal.

=== Catanzaro ===
After playing two more games in the 1981–82 2. Bundesliga for 1860 Munich, he was transferred for 400,000 Italian lire to Serie A club Catanzaro. He was brought there to replace Massimo Palanca who had just left to play for Napoli. Năstase made his Serie A debut on 13 September 1981 when coach Bruno Pace sent him at half-time to replace Carlo Borghi in a 1–1 draw against Napoli. On 25 October he scored his first goal in a 1–1 draw against Como. However, during his three seasons spent at the club, of which the last was in Serie B, Năstase scored only three goals as his performance was affected by his excessive nightlife activity, including heavy alcohol consumption at parties and clubs.

=== SV Salzburg ===
Năstase went to play for SV Salzburg in the 1984–85 season. He made his Austrian Bundesliga debut on 17 November 1984 under coach Hannes Winklbauer in a 3–1 home loss to VÖEST Linz. After only three league appearances for them, Năstase retired from playing football at age 31.

== International career ==
From 1968 until 1972, Năstase made several appearances for Romania's Olympic, under-21, under-23 and B teams.

Năstase played one game for Romania on 12 May 1976 under coach Ștefan Kovács in a 1–0 loss to Bulgaria in the 1973–76 Balkan Cup final.

== Honours ==
Progresul București

- Divizia B: 1969–70

Steaua București

- Divizia A: 1975–76, 1977–78
- Cupa României: 1975–76, 1978–79
