= Constantin Zamfir =

Romanian footballer (1951–2025)

Personal information
- Date of birth: 15 May 1951
- Place of birth: Bucșani, Romania
- Date of death: 3 November 2025 (aged 74)
- Position: Midfielder

Senior career*
Years	Team	Apps	(Gls)
1969–1970	Petrolul Videle		
1970–1971	Voința Ilia		
1971–1972	Dacia Orăștie		
1972–1973	Petrolul Videle		
1973–1975	Petrolul Ploiești	55	(10)
1975–1979	Steaua București	109	(21)
1980	Progresul București	10	(3)
1980–1981	FCM Galați	7	(2)
1981–1982	Progresul București	14	(3)
1982–1983	Metalurgistul Cugir		
1983	Dacia Pitești		
1984	Chimia Turnu Măgurele		
1984	Metalurgistul Cugir		
1985	Urbis București		
- Laromet București
- Inter Vaslui
- Petrolul Roata de Jos
Total		195	(39)

International career
1975	Romania U21	2	(0)
1975	Romania U23	3	(0)
1975–1977	Romania B	2	(0)
1976–1979	Romania Olympic	2	(1)
1975–1978	Romania	11	(0)

Managerial career
- Petrolul Roata de Jos
- * Club domestic league appearances and goals

Constantin Zamfir (15 May 1951 – 3 November 2025) was a Romanian footballer who played as a midfielder.

== Club career ==
Zamfir, nicknamed Papucul Zburător (The Flying Shoe), was born on 15 May 1951 in Bucșani, Romania. In 1969, he began playing football at Divizia C club Petrolul Videle. Afterwards he went to play for Voința Ilia and Dacia Orăștie, before returning to Videle in 1972. Subsequently, in 1973, he joined Petrolul Ploiești where he made his Divizia A debut on 12 August 1973 under coach Gheorghe Dumitrescu in a 2–1 away loss to CFR Cluj. The team was relegated at the end of his first season, but Zamfir stayed with the club for one more year.

In 1975, he joined Steaua București which sent eight players to Petrolul in exchange for his transfer, including Florian Dumitrescu and Nicolae Pantea. In the summer of that year, the club participated in a tournament in Spain where they played against Sevilla, Espanyol Barcelona, Cádiz and Granada. Zamfir made a good impression and was nicknamed by the Spanish press as "The New Gento". Sevilla also made an offer of 2 million pesetas for him, but he was denied the transfer. On 2 November 1975, he netted a goal in a 3–3 draw against rivals Dinamo București. He finished his first season at Steaua by winning The Double, being used by coach Emerich Jenei in 32 league games in which he scored eight goals, and played the entire match in the 2–1 win over CSU Galați in the Cupa României final. He reached another Cupa României final in 1977, where Jenei used him the full 90 minutes in the eventual 2–1 loss to Universitatea Craiova. In the 1977–78 season, Zamfir scored three goals in the 24 league games Jenei used him, helping the club win another title. The team reached the 1979 Cupa României final under coach Gheorghe Constantin, Zamfir playing the entire match in the 3–0 win over Sportul Studențesc București. In his five-season spell with The Military Men he also played eight matches in European competitions, most notably getting past Young Boys with an 8–2 aggregate win in the first round of the 1979–80 European Cup Winners' Cup.

In the middle of the 1979–80 season, Zamfir left Steaua to join Divizia B club Progresul București, helping them earn promotion to Divizia A at the end of the season. For the following season he went to play in the first league for FCM Galați which was relegated at the end of the season. Subsequently, he returned to Progresul for the 1981–82 Divizia A season, but suffered another relegation at the end of it. He made his last Divizia A appearance on 9 June 1982 in Progresul's 3–1 home loss to Olt Scornicești, totaling 157 matches with 30 goals in the competition. Zamfir ended his career after playing several years in the Romanian lower leagues for teams such as Metalurgistul Cugir, Dacia Pitești, Chimia Turnu Măgurele, Urbis București, Laromet București, Inter Vaslui and Petrolul Roata de Jos. At the latter, he worked as a player-coach.

== International career ==
Between 1975 and 1979, Zamfir made several appearances for Romania's under-21, under-23, B and Olympic teams. Notably, he scored a goal for the Olympic side in a 5–1 victory against the Netherlands during the 1976 Summer Olympics qualifiers.

Zamfir played 11 games for Romania, making his debut on 16 November 1975 under coach Valentin Stănescu in a 2–2 draw against Spain in the Euro 1976 qualifiers. Afterwards he made three appearances during the 1978 World Cup qualifiers, including two victories against Spain and Yugoslavia. He also played three matches during the 1977–80 Balkan Cup, including his last match for the national team which took place on 31 May 1978 in a 1–1 draw against Bulgaria.

== Coaching career ==
Zamfir was a player-coach at Petrolul Roata de Jos in the Romanian lower leagues. Afterwards he coached juniors for clubs such as Concordia Chiajna.

== Style of play ==
Emerich Jenei, his coach from Steaua București, said about him: "I have coached few footballers in my career who had as many qualities as Zamfir." Zamfir was one of Ilie Dumitrescu's childhood idols, who described his style of play as: "He had very good speed, he was explosive, and in one-on-one duels he was very good. He excelled at speed dribbling. (...) He was a great talent. He was a classic winger. The style that Giggs had. He had speed, he crossed very well."

== Death ==
Zamfir died on 3 November 2025, at the age of 74.

== Honours ==
Steaua București

- Divizia A: 1975–76, 1977–78
- Cupa României: 1975–76, 1978–79, runner-up 1976–77

Progresul București

- Divizia B: 1979–80
