= Radu Troi =

Romanian footballer

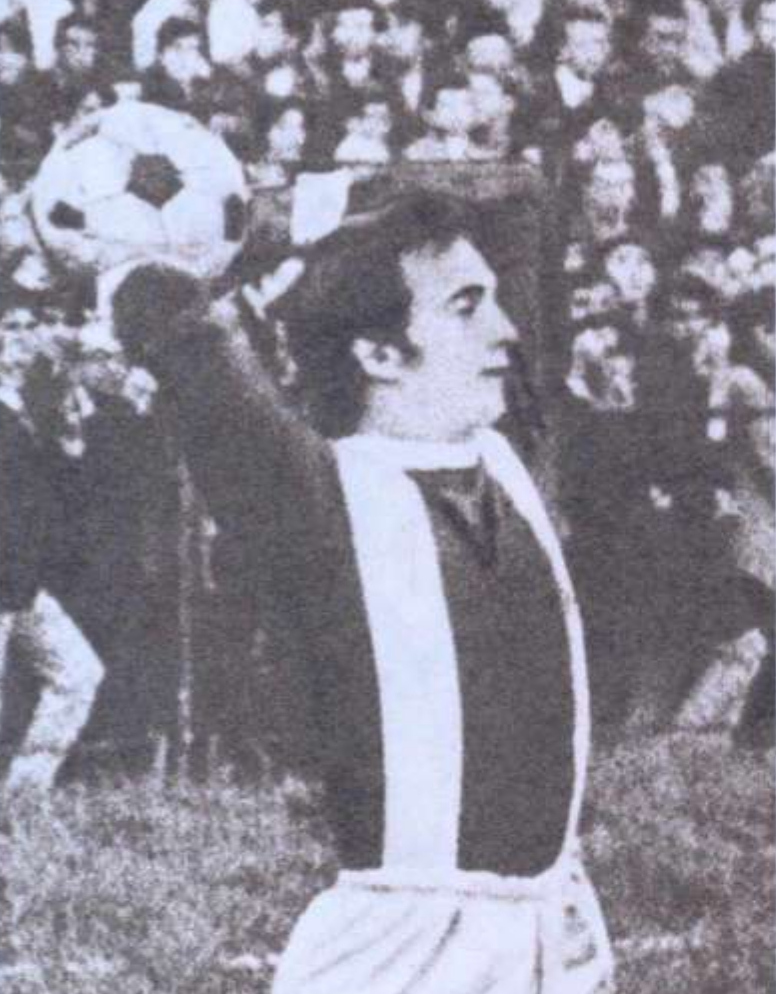

Personal information
- Date of birth: 12 June 1949 (age 77)
- Place of birth: Dragomirești-Vale, Ilfov County, Romania
- Height: 1.80 m (5 ft 11 in)
- Position: Striker

Youth career
- 1966–1968: UREMOAS București

Senior career*
Years	Team	Apps	(Gls)
1969–1970	Dinamo București	0	(0)
1970–1972	Metalul București	36	(1)
1972–1975	Argeș Pitești	92	(24)
1975–1979	Steaua București	87	(17)
Total		215	(42)

International career
	Romania U23	7	(2)
	Romania B	7	(2)
1975	Romania Olympic	1	(0)
1973–1977	Romania	15	(2)

Managerial career
- 1986–1988: Steaua București (assistant coach)
- Steaua București (youth groups)
- * Club domestic league appearances and goals

Radu Troi (born 12 June 1949), is a former Romanian professional football player.

== Club career ==
Troi was born on 12 June 1949 in Dragomirești-Vale, Ilfov County, Romania and began playing junior-level football in 1966, aged 18 at UREMOAS București, moving two years later to Dinamo București. In the middle of the 1971–72 season he left Dinamo as he made no appearances in the league for them, going to play for Divizia B club Metalul București.

In 1972, Troi went for two seasons to title holders Argeș Pitești, making his Divizia A debut on 20 August under coach Florin Halagian in a 2–1 away loss to UTA Arad. He played three games in the 1972–73 European Cup campaign, eliminating Aris Bonnevoie in the first round against whom he scored a goal, then in the following one they won a home game with 2–1 against Real Madrid, but lost the second leg with 3–1. In his last season spent at Argeș, Troi scored a personal record of nine league goals.

In 1975 he joined Steaua București. There, in his first season he helped the club win The Double, being used by coach Emerich Jenei in 23 league games in which he scored four goals, and played the entire match in the 2–1 win over CSU Galați in the Cupa României final. In the following season, Troi played in both legs in the first round of the 1976–77 European Cup against Club Brugge, scoring one goal in the 3–2 loss on aggregate. He also reached another Cupa României final, where Jenei kept him on as a starter for 72 minutes before Gabriel Zahiu replaced him in the eventual 2–1 loss to Universitatea Craiova. In the 1977–78 season, Troi scored five goals in the 26 league games Jenei used him, helping the club win another title. In the next two seasons, under coach Gheorghe Constantin, the team reached two more Cupa României finals. The first final ended with a 3–0 win over Sportul Studențesc București and the one in 1980 with a 2–1 loss to Politehnica Timișoara, but he did not play in either of them. He scored a brace in the 2–0 win over AS Monaco in the first round of the 1978–79 European Cup, but they did not qualify further as they lost the first leg with 3–0. On 15 October 1978, Troi made his last Divizia A appearance, playing for Steaua in a 1–0 away loss to Politehnica Iași, totaling 179 matches with 41 goals in the competition and nine games with three goals in European competitions.

When he was asked in an interview what was the most beautiful moment of his career, Troi praised his former Argeș teammate Nicolae Dobrin:"The fact that I had the opportunity to play with Dobrin. For me, he was the best Romanian footballer, by far and it was the most beautiful moment in my life to be able to be a teammate with such a footballer."

== International career ==
Troi played 15 games and scored two goals for Romania, making his debut under coach Valentin Stănescu on 18 April 1973 in a 2–0 friendly loss to the Soviet Union. His next two games were victories against Albania and East Germany in the 1974 World Cup qualifiers. Subsequently, he appeared in a draw against Denmark during the Euro 1976 qualifiers. Troi scored his first goal for the national team in a 2–2 friendly draw against the Soviet Union, and then he scored another one in a victory against Bulgaria in the 1973–76 Balkan Cup. His last appearance for The Tricolours occurred on 21 September 1977 in a 6–1 home win over Greece in a friendly.

=== International goals ===
Scores and results list Romania's goal tally first, score column indicates score after each Radu Troi goal.

#	Date	Venue	Cap	Opponent	Score	Result	Competition
1	29 November 1975	Stadionul 23 August, Bucharest, Romania	10	Soviet Union	1–0	2–2	Friendly
2	28 November 1976	Stadionul 23 August, Bucharest, Romania	12	Bulgaria	1–1	3–2	1973–76 Balkan Cup

== Honours ==
Steaua București

- Divizia A: 1975–76, 1977–78
- Cupa României: 1975–76, 1978–79, runner-up 1976–77, 1979–80
