= Constantin Dumitriu =

Romanian footballer

Personal information
- Date of birth: 14 November 1953 (age 72)
- Place of birth: Bucharest, Romania
- Height: 1.77 m (5 ft 10 in)
- Position: Central midfielder

Senior career*
Years	Team	Apps	(Gls)
1970–1972	Progresul București	29	(2)
1972–1976	Steaua București	72	(4)
1976–1982	Corvinul Hunedoara	156	(16)
Total		257	(22)

International career
1973–1975	Romania U23	11	(0)
- * Club domestic league appearances and goals

Constantin Dumitriu (born 14 November 1953), commonly known as Dumitriu IV is a Romanian former football midfielder.

== Club career ==
Dumitriu was born on 14 November 1953 in Bucharest, Romania. He began playing football at Progresul București, making his Divizia A debut on 8 May 1971 under coach Petre Moldoveanu in a 1–0 home victory against Rapid București. The team was relegated by the end of the season, but he stayed with the club for one more season in Divizia B. In 1972, Dumitriu joined Steaua București. In the 1975–76 season, he helped Steaua win The Double, being used by coach Emerich Jenei in 15 league games. Subsequently, he went to play for Corvinul Hunedoara in 1976. There, in the 1977–78 season, he scored a career best of seven goals. The club was relegated at the end of the 1978–79 season, but Dumitriu stayed with the team, helping them gain promotion back to the first league after one year. On 2 June 1982, he made his last Divizia A appearance in Corvinul's 3–1 away loss to Politehnica Timișoara, totaling 207 matches with 19 goals in the competition.

== International career ==
Dumitriu played 11 matches from 1973 to 1975 for Romania's under-23 team.

== Personal life ==
Dumitriu is the younger brother of Emil Dumitriu, also known as Dumitriu II, and Dumitru Dumitriu, known as Dumitriu III, both of whom were international footballers.

== Honours ==
Steaua București

- Divizia A: 1975–76
- Cupa României: 1975–76

Corvinul Hunedoara

- Divizia B: 1979–80
