= 1976 Cupa României final =

Romanian football match

- Event: 1975–76 Cupa României
| Steaua București | CSU Galaţi |
| 1 | 0 |
- Date: 30 June 1976
- Venue: 23 August, Bucharest
- Referee: Nicolae Petriceanu (Bucharest)
- Attendance: 50,000

The 1976 Cupa României final was the 38th final of Romania's most prestigious football cup competition. It was disputed between Steaua București and CSU Galaţi, and was won by Steaua București after a game with only one goal. It was the 12th cup for Steaua București.

CSU Galaţi became the 11th team representing Divizia B that reached the Romanian Cup final.

== Match details ==
30 June 1976
19:00 EET

| Steaua București | 1–0 | CSU Galaţi |
|---|---|---|
| Iordănescu 75' | Report |

23 August, Bucharest
Attendance: 50,000
Referee: Nicolae Petriceanu (Bucharest)

| GK | 1 | (Romania) Vasile Iordache |
| DF | 2 | (Romania) Teodor Anghelini |
| DF | 3 | (Romania) Mario Agiu |
| DF | 4 | (Romania) Ștefan Sameș |
| DF | 5 | (Romania) Iosif Vigu |
| MF | 6 | (Romania) Ion Ion |
| MF | 7 | (Romania) Ion Dumitru |
| MF | 8 | (Romania) Anghel Iordănescu |
| FW | 9 | (Romania) Radu Troi |
| FW | 10 | (Romania) Marcel Răducanu (substituted off) 63' |
| FW | 11 | (Romania) Constantin Zamfir |
Substitutions:
| FW | 12 | (Romania) Viorel Năstase (substituted in) 63' |
Manager:
(Romania) Emerich Jenei

| GK | 1 | (Romania) Gheorghe Tănase |
| DF | 2 | (Romania) Pasquale |
| DF | 3 | (Romania) Mihai Olteanu |
| DF | 4 | (Romania) Marta |
| DF | 5 | (Romania) Şarpe |
| MF | 6 | (Romania) Păunescu (substituted off) 86' |
| MF | 7 | (Romania) Mihail Bejenaru |
| MF | 8 | (Romania) Georgescu (substituted off) 71' |
| FW | 9 | (Romania) Valentin Kramer |
| FW | 10 | (Romania) Petre Marinescu |
| FW | 11 | (Romania) Dobre |
Substitutions:
| MF | 12 | (Romania) Teodor Cotigă (substituted in) 71' |
| MF | 13 | (Romania) Ene (substituted in) 86' |
Manager:
(Romania) Ion Zaharia

== See also ==
- List of Cupa României finals
