= Marcel Răducanu =

Romanian footballer (born 1954)

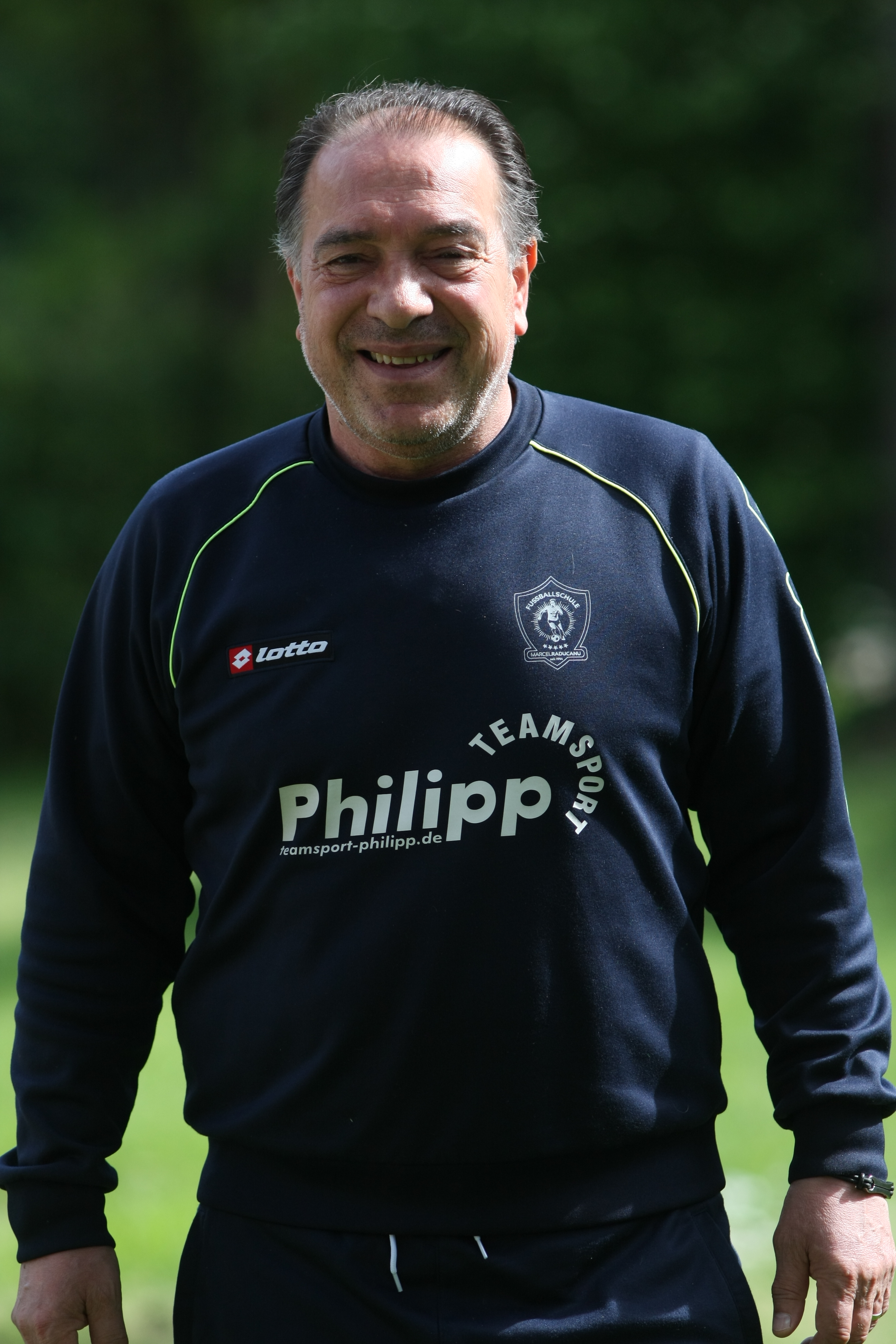
- Răducanu in 2014

Personal information
- Date of birth: 21 October 1954 (age 72)
- Place of birth: Bucharest, Romania
- Height: 1.78 m (5 ft 10 in)
- Position: Attacking midfielder

Youth career
- 1962–1964: Progresul București
- 1964–1972: Steaua București

Senior career*
Years	Team	Apps	(Gls)
1972–1981	Steaua București	229	(94)
1982–1988	Borussia Dortmund	163	(31)
1988–1990	FC Zürich	47	(12)
Total		439	(137)

International career
1976–1981	Romania (Note: Including three appearances for Romania's Olympic team.)	21	(3)

Managerial career
- 1992–1993: Türkgücü München
- * Club domestic league appearances and goals

Marcel Răducanu (born 21 October 1954) is a Romanian former professional footballer who played as an attacking midfielder.

== Club career ==
"Răducanu had an exceptional left foot, practically a feast for the viewer's eye. Making a comparison over time, we can put him on the same value scale as Hagi."

— Karl-Heinz Rummenigge

=== Steaua București ===
Răducanu was born on 21 October 1954 in Bucharest, Romania. He grew up in the Pantelimon neighborhood and started to play football at the age of seven at Progresul București. Subsequently, at the age of nine and a half, he moved to Steaua București's youth center where he was coached by Francisc Fabian.

Răducanu made his Divizia A debut on 22 April 1973, playing under coach Gheorghe Constantin in Steaua's 2–0 loss to CSM Reșița. He helped The Military Men win The Double in the 1975–76 season, contributing with 17 goals in the 31 league matches he was used by coach Emerich Jenei. The coach also used him until the 63rd minute when he replaced him with Viorel Năstase in the 1–0 victory against CSU Galați in the Cupa României final. Răducanu won another title under coach Jenei in the 1977–78 season for which he contributed with 18 goals in 31 matches. Subsequently, he won the 1978–79 Cupa României in which he was used by coach Gheorghe Constantin the entire match in the final, scoring two goals in the 3–0 win over Sportul Studențesc București. In the 1979–80 season, he netted a personal record of 23 goals, being the league second top-scorer, having one fewer than Universitatea Cluj's Septimiu Câmpeanu.

Răducanu also played 11 matches in which he scored five goals in European competitions for Steaua. In the 6–0 victory against Young Boys in the 1979–80 European Cup Winners' Cup, Răducanu netted one of his most beautiful goals after showing his dribbling abilities against Young Boys' defense, the Swiss goalkeeper, Walter Eichenberger saying in an interview years later after that match:"He humiliated us and laughed at us". In 1980 he was named the Romanian Footballer of the Year and was nominated for the Ballon d'Or. During these years he scored three league goals in the derby against Dinamo, as his side earned two victories and one loss, also netting once in a Cupa României victory. He made his last Divizia A appearance on 21 June 1981 in a 2–1 away win over FCM Galați, totaling 229 appearances with 94 goals in the competition.

=== Borussia Dortmund ===
In the summer of 1981, Răducanu defected following a match in Dortmund, West Germany. In his native Romania this act was considered a desertion, as he was a captain in the Army, therefore he was sentenced to nearly six years in prison in his absence. Once in West Germany he signed with both Hannover 96 and Borussia Dortmund, and as a result was suspended by UEFA for one year. In order to have his services, Borussia paid half a million deutschmarks to Hannover, and Răducanu made his debut in Bundesliga on 17 August 1982 under coach Karl-Heinz Feldkamp in a 1–1 draw against VfB Stuttgart. In his first season, Răducanu scored nine goals in 26 matches, including two goals in a 4–4 draw against Bayern Munich of which one was from a free kick and the other after a series of dribbles. These performances made sports magazine Kicker include him in the team of the 1982–83 season. Between 1982 and 1988, he played a total of 163 Bundesliga matches with 31 goals and made five appearances in European competitions. In 2022, the German newspaper Bild included Răducanu in Borussia Dortmund's best 50 players of all time, placing him in 50th place.

=== FC Zürich ===
In 1988 Răducanu signed a contract in Switzerland with FC Zürich. There, he played 47 league matches, scoring 12 goals and winning the promotion to the top league Nationalliga A in his second season.

== International career ==
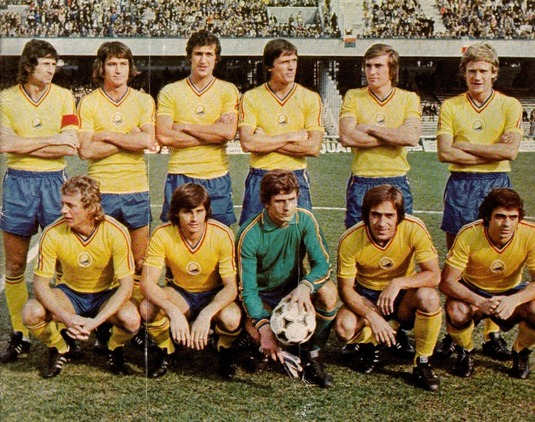
Răducanu (bottom row, second from right) with Romania at the Stadio San Paolo in Naples, Italy, February 1980.

Răducanu played 18 games and scored three goals for Romania, making his debut on 13 May 1979 when coach Florin Halagian sent him in the 65th minute to replace Constantin Stan in a 1–1 draw against Cyprus in the Euro 1980 qualifiers. He played another two games during those qualifiers, scoring a goal in each of them, a 2–1 loss to Yugoslavia and a 2–0 win in the second leg against Cyprus. In the 1977–80 Balkan Cup final, he played in both legs of the 4–3 aggregate victory against Yugoslavia. Răducanu played four games in the 1982 World Cup qualifiers, including a 2–1 win over England in which he opened the scoring.

== Coaching career ==
Răducanu coached Türkgücü München in the 1992–93 Landesliga Bayern-Süd season. In 1994 he opened a football school in Dortmund and Mario Götze trained at his academy when he was 10 years old.

== Personal life ==
His uncle, Marin Voinea, was also a footballer.

A book about him was written by George Coca Lob, titled Marcel Răducanu. Talent, fenomen și legendă (Marcel Răducanu. Talent, phenomenon and legend).

== Career statistics ==
Scores and results list Romania's goal tally first, score column indicates score after each Răducanu goal.

List of international goals scored by Marcel Răducanu
#	Date	Venue	Cap	Opponent	Score	Result	Competition
1	31 October 1979	Stadion Trepča, Mitrovica, Kosovo, Yugoslavia	4	Yugoslavia	1–2	1–2	Euro 1980 qualifiers
2	18 November 1979	Stadionul Dinamo, Bucharest, Romania	5	Cyprus	2–0	2–0	Euro 1980 qualifiers
3	15 October 1980	Stadionul 23 August, Bucharest, Romania	13	England	1–0	2–1	1982 World Cup qualifiers

== Honours ==
Steaua București

- Divizia A: 1975–76, 1977–78
- Cupa României: 1975–76, 1978–79

FC Zürich

- Nationalliga B: 1989–90

Romania

- Balkan Cup: 1977–80

Individual

- Romanian Footballer of the Year: 1980
- Ballon d'Or: 1980 (27th place)
- Kicker Bundesliga Team of the Season: 1982–83
