= Mario Agiu =

Romanian footballer

Personal information
- Date of birth: 5 March 1956 (age 70)
- Place of birth: Bucharest, Romania
- Height: 1.79 m (5 ft 10 in)
- Position: Central defender

Youth career
- 1968–1974: Steaua București

Senior career*
Years	Team	Apps	(Gls)
1974–1975	Olimpia Satu Mare	13	(0)
1975–1981	Steaua București	131	(3)
1981–1984	CS Târgoviște	62	(9)
1984–1986	Rapid București	59	(13)
1986–1990	Oțelul Galați	84	(7)
Total		349	(32)

International career
1976–1979	Romania U21	8	(1)
1975–1976	Romania U23	5	(0)
1979	Romania B	1	(0)

Managerial career
- 1984: CS Târgoviște
- * Club domestic league appearances and goals

Mario Agiu (born 5 March 1956) is a Romanian former footballer who played as a central defender. He was for a short while manager at CS Târgoviște in the 1983–84 Divizia A season.

== Club career ==
Agiu was born on 5 March 1956 in Bucharest, Romania and began playing junior-level football in 1968 at local club Steaua. He started his senior career at Olimpia Satu Mare, making his Divizia A debut under coach Gheorghe Staicu on 3 November 1974 in a 2–0 away loss to Chimia Râmnicu Vâlcea.

In the following season he returned to Steaua, helping the club win The Double, being used by coach Emerich Jenei in 29 league games in which he scored once and also played the full 90 minutes in the 1–0 win over CSU Galați in the Cupa României final. In the 1977–78 season, Agiu helped the club win a second title, netting one goal in the 33 matches that Jenei used him. In 1979 he won another Cupa României trophy, but coach Gheorghe Constantin did not use him in the 3–0 win over Sportul Studențesc București in the final. In his six-season spell with The Military Men he also played eight matches in European competitions, most notably getting past Young Boys with an 8–2 aggregate win in the first round of the 1979–80 European Cup Winners' Cup.

In 1981, Agiu went to play for three years at CS Târgoviște, also being the team's head coach for a few rounds in 1984. His next spell was at Rapid București for two seasons. In 1986 he accepted an offer from Oțelul Galați where he was wanted by one of his former coaches from Târgoviște, Constantin Rădulescu. There, he would form a strong partnership in the central defense with Viorel Anghelinei. He helped The Steelworkers earn a fourth place in the 1987–88 season. Thus, they earned the right to play in the 1988–89 UEFA Cup where in the first round they defeated Juventus Torino with 1–0 in the first leg, but lost the second with 5–0. Agiu made his last Divizia A appearance on 9 April 1989 in a 1–0 home loss to Sportul Studențesc, as Oțelul was relegated at the end of the season. He has a total of 336 matches with 31 goals in the Romanian top-league. He spent one more season spent with Oțelul in Divizia B, retiring afterwards. After he ended his career, Agiu described the period spent at Oțelul Galați as "the best years of my career".

== International career ==
Between 1975 and 1979, Agiu made several appearances for Romania's under-21, under-23 and B squads.

== Honours ==
Steaua București

- Divizia A: 1975–76, 1977–78
- Cupa României: 1975–76, 1978–79
