= Romanian Footballer of the Year (Gazeta Sporturilor) =

Annual football award

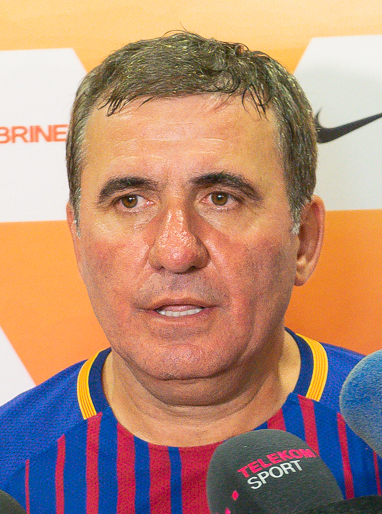
- Gheorghe Hagi won the award a record of seven times.
- Sport: Association football
- Competition: All levels of Romanian and international football
- Local name: Jucătorul român al anului / Trofeul Nicolae Dobrin (Romanian)
- Country: Romania
- Presented by: Gazeta Sporturilor

History
- First award: 1966
- Editions: 60
- First winner: Nicolae Dobrin
- Most wins: Gheorghe Hagi 7 times
- Most recent: Andrei Rațiu
- Website: Official website

The Romanian Footballer of the Year (Romanian: Fotbalistul român al anului), also known as the Nicolae Dobrin Trophy (Romanian: Trofeul Nicolae Dobrin), is an annual association football award given by the Gazeta Sporturilor newspaper to the Romanian player adjudged to have been the best during a calendar year. The current holder is Andrei Rațiu, who won the award for his performances in 2025 representing Rayo Vallecano.

It has been presented since 1966 and is currently named after Nicolae Dobrin, the first recipient of the award and one of Romania's most notable footballers. Gheorghe Hagi, the joint leading goalscorer of the national team alongside Adrian Mutu, has received the trophy a record of seven times.

Other annual honours handed out by Gazeta Sporturilor include the Foreign Player of the Year in Romania and the Romania Coach of the Year awards.

== Winners ==
Year	Winner	Runner-up	Third place	Fourth place	Fifth place
1966	Nicolae Dobrin	Vasile Gergely	Ion Pîrcălab	Emil Dumitriu	Ion Nunweiller
1967	Nicolae Dobrin	Gheorghe Constantin	Narcis Coman	Ion Ionescu	Dan Coe
1968	Florea Dumitrache	Cornel Dinu	Lajos Sătmăreanu	Gheorghe Gornea	Ion Barbu; Narcis Coman
1969	Florea Dumitrache	Nicolae Dobrin	Radu Nunweiller	Lajos Sătmăreanu	Aristide Ghiță
1970	Cornel Dinu	Necula Răducanu	Florea Dumitrache	Radu Nunweiller	Nicolae Lupescu; Vasile Ianul
1971	Nicolae Dobrin	Ion Dumitru	Nicolae Lupescu	Mircea Lucescu	Cornel Dinu
1972	Cornel Dinu	Alexandru Boc	Nicolae Dobrin	Stere Adamache	Ion Dumitru
1973	Ion Dumitru	Cornel Dinu	Nicolae Dobrin	Dumitru Antonescu	Florea Dumitrache
1974	Cornel Dinu	Mircea Lucescu	Ion Dumitru	Silviu Iorgulescu	Alexandru Boc; Necula Răducanu
1975	Ion Dumitru	—	—	—	—
1976	Dudu Georgescu	László Bölöni	Anghel Iordănescu	Necula Răducanu	Florin Cheran
1977	László Bölöni	Dudu Georgescu	Alexandru Sătmăreanu	Nicolae Dobrin	Iosif Vigu
1978	Narcis Coman	Nicolae Dobrin	Costică Ștefănescu	Cornel Dinu	Ștefan Sameș
1979	Ștefan Sameș	Costică Ștefănescu	Marcel Răducanu	Nicolae Dobrin	Cornel Dinu
1980	Marcel Răducanu	Anghel Iordănescu	Costică Ștefănescu	Vasile Iordache	Rodion Cămătaru
1981	Ilie Balaci	Costică Ștefănescu	Ștefan Sameș	Vasile Iordache	Romulus Gabor
1982	Ilie Balaci	Costică Ștefănescu	Rodion Cămătaru	László Bölöni	Gino Iorgulescu
1983	László Bölöni	Silviu Lung	Costică Ștefănescu	Rodion Cămătaru	Mircea Rednic
1984	Silviu Lung	Gheorghe Hagi	Costică Ștefănescu	Mircea Rednic	Dumitru Moraru
1985	Gheorghe Hagi	Costică Ștefănescu	László Bölöni	Silviu Lung	Michael Klein
1986	Helmut Duckadam	László Bölöni	Miodrag Belodedici	Rodion Cămătaru	Gheorghe Hagi
1987	Gheorghe Hagi	Miodrag Belodedici	Rodion Cămătaru	László Bölöni	Marius Lăcătuș
1988	Dorin Mateuț	Gheorghe Hagi	Miodrag Belodedici	Marius Lăcătuș	Ovidiu Sabău
1989	Gheorghe Popescu	Ovidiu Sabău	Gheorghe Hagi	Marius Lăcătuș	Ștefan Iovan
1990	Gheorghe Popescu	Iosif Rotariu	Dan Petrescu	Ionuț Lupescu	Marius Lăcătuș
1991	Gheorghe Popescu	Gheorghe Hagi	Ionuț Lupescu	Silviu Lung	Dorinel Munteanu
1992	Gheorghe Popescu	Gheorghe Hagi	Dorinel Munteanu	Ionuț Lupescu	Ilie Dumitrescu
1993	Gheorghe Hagi	Ilie Dumitrescu	Florin Răducioiu	Gheorghe Popescu	Ovidiu Sabău
1994	Gheorghe Hagi	Florin Răducioiu	Ionuț Lupescu	Gheorghe Popescu	Ilie Dumitrescu
1995	Gheorghe Popescu	Gheorghe Hagi	Daniel Prodan	Dorinel Munteanu	Florin Răducioiu
1996	Gheorghe Popescu	Gheorghe Hagi	Viorel Moldovan	Adrian Ilie	Dorinel Munteanu
1997	Gheorghe Hagi	Dan Petrescu	Marius Lăcătuș	Gheorghe Popescu	Adrian Ilie
1998	Adrian Ilie	Gheorghe Popescu	Gheorghe Hagi	Bogdan Stelea	Ionuț Lupescu
1999	Gheorghe Hagi	Dan Petrescu	Adrian Ilie	Gheorghe Popescu	Adrian Mutu
2000	Gheorghe Hagi	Cristian Chivu	Gheorghe Popescu	Dorinel Munteanu	Marius Niculae
2001	Cosmin Contra	Marius Niculae	Cristian Chivu	Gheorghe Popescu	Adrian Mihalcea; Daniel Pancu
2002	Cristian Chivu	Adrian Mutu	Cosmin Contra	Daniel Pancu	Mirel Rădoi
2003	Adrian Mutu	Cristian Chivu	Bogdan Lobonț	Mirel Rădoi	Daniel Pancu
2004	Ionel Dănciulescu	Adrian Neaga	Mirel Rădoi	Daniel Niculae	Florentin Petre; Tiberiu Ghioane
2005	Adrian Mutu	Mirel Rădoi	Dorinel Munteanu	Nicolae Dică	Răzvan Cociș; Marius Măldărășanu
2006	Nicolae Dică	Adrian Mutu	Cristian Chivu	Dănuț Coman; Ciprian Marica	—
2007	Adrian Mutu	Bogdan Lobonț	Cristian Chivu	Dorin Goian	Nicolae Dică
2008	Adrian Mutu	Dorin Goian; Cristian Chivu	—	Bogdan Lobonț	Eugen Trică
2009	Cristian Chivu	Răzvan Raț	Adrian Mutu	Iulian Apostol	Gigel Bucur
2010	Cristian Chivu	Bogdan Stancu	Răzvan Raț	Ștefan Radu	Gabriel Tamaș
2011	Gabriel Torje	Lucian Sânmărtean	Cristian Săpunaru	Ionel Dănciulescu	Ștefan Radu
2012	Raul Rusescu	Vlad Chiricheș	Gabriel Torje	Alexandru Bourceanu	Răzvan Raț
2013	Vlad Chiricheș	Alexandru Maxim	Alexandru Bourceanu	Ciprian Marica	Daniel Pancu
2014	Lucian Sânmărtean	Claudiu Keșerü	Răzvan Raț	Alexandru Chipciu	Alexandru Maxim
2015	Ciprian Tătărușanu	Constantin Budescu	Costel Pantilimon	Ioan Hora	Florin Andone
2016	Denis Alibec	Nicolae Stanciu	Răzvan Marin	Claudiu Keșerü	Florin Andone
2017	Constantin Budescu	Ciprian Tătărușanu	Florin Niță; Ștefan Radu	—	Alexandru Băluță; Cristian Săpunaru
2018	George Țucudean	Răzvan Marin	Ianis Hagi	Ciprian Tătărușanu	Alexandru Mitriță
2019	Ionuț Radu	George Pușcaș	Nicolae Stanciu	Alexandru Mitriță	Ianis Hagi; Florinel Coman
2020	Dennis Man	Ciprian Deac	Nicolae Stanciu	Ianis Hagi	Alexandru Maxim
2021	Florin Niță	Ianis Hagi; Nicolae Stanciu	—	Alexandru Cicâldău	Răzvan Marin
2022	Nicolae Stanciu	Florin Tănase	Ciprian Deac	—	—
2023	Radu Drăgușin	Nicolae Stanciu	Denis Alibec	Horațiu Moldovan	Florinel Coman
2024	Dennis Man	Radu Drăgușin	Răzvan Marin	Andrei Rațiu	Florin Niță
2025	Andrei Rațiu	Dennis Man	Daniel Bîrligea	Vlad Dragomir; Louis Munteanu	—

== Breakdown of winners ==
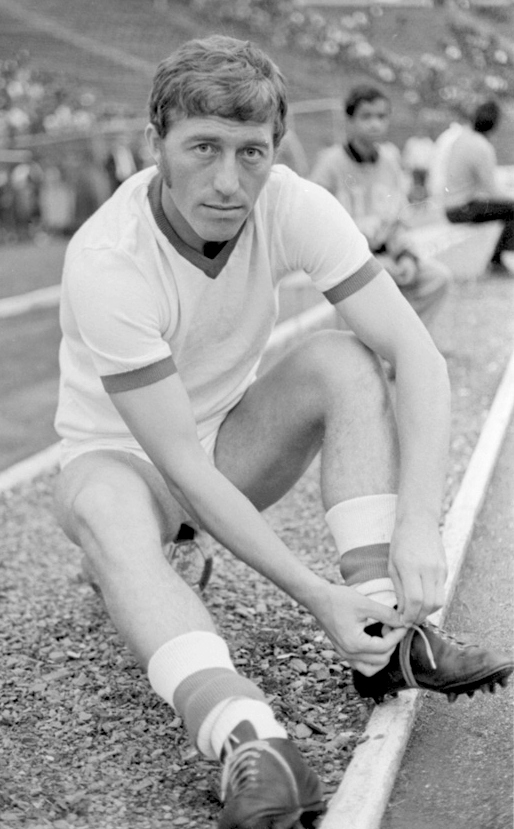
Nicolae Dobrin, the inaugural award winner.

=== By number of wins ===
Player	Win(s)	Year(s)
Gheorghe Hagi	7	1985, 1987, 1993, 1994, 1997, 1999, 2000
Gheorghe Popescu	6	1989, 1990, 1991, 1992, 1995, 1996
Adrian Mutu	4	2003, 2005, 2007, 2008
Cristian Chivu	3	2002, 2009, 2010
Cornel Dinu	3	1970, 1972, 1974
Nicolae Dobrin	3	1966, 1967, 1971
Dennis Man	2	2020, 2024
Ilie Balaci	2	1981, 1982
László Bölöni	2	1977, 1983
Florea Dumitrache	2	1968, 1969
Ion Dumitru	2	1973, 1975
24 others	1	—

=== By club ===
Club	Win(s) (outright wins/shared titles by two teams)	Year(s) (* title was shared by two teams)
Steaua București / FCSB	12 (10/2)	1973, 1975, 1979, 1980, 1986, 1987, 2006, 2012, 2013*, 2014, 2017*, 2020
Dinamo București	9 (8/1)	1968, 1969, 1970, 1972, 1974, 1976, 1988, 2004, 2011*
Universitatea Craiova	5 (4/1)	1981, 1982, 1984, 1989, 1990*
Argeș Pitești	3 (3/0)	1966, 1967, 1971
(Italy) Fiorentina	3 (3/0)	2007, 2008, 2015
(Turkey) Galatasaray	3 (3/0)	1997, 1999, 2000
(Netherlands) PSV Eindhoven	3 (2/1)	1990*, 1991, 1992
(Spain) Barcelona	3 (1/2)	1994*, 1995*, 1996
ASA Târgu Mureș	2 (2/0)	1977, 1983
(Italy) Genoa	2 (2/0)	2019, 2023
Astra Giurgiu	2 (1/1)	2016, 2017*
(Italy) Brescia	2 (1/1)	1993, 1994*
(Italy) Inter Milan	2 (2/0)	2009, 2010
(England) Tottenham Hotspur	2 (0/2)	1995*, 2013*
(Italy) Parma	2 (1/1)	2003*, 2024
(Netherlands) Ajax	1 (1/0)	2002
CFR Cluj	1 (1/0)	2018
(Italy) Juventus	1 (1/0)	2005
(Czech Republic) Sparta Prague	1 (1/0)	2021
Sportul Studențesc	1 (1/0)	1985
Târgoviște	1 (1/0)	1978
(Spain) Valencia	1 (1/0)	1998
(China) Wuhan Three Towns	1 (1/0)	2022
(Spain) Rayo Vallecano	1 (1/0)	2025
(Spain) Alavés	1 (0/1)	2001*
(England) Chelsea	1 (0/1)	2003*
(Italy) Milan	1 (0/1)	2001*
(Italy) Udinese	1 (0/1)	2011*

== See also ==
- Gazeta Sporturilor Foreign Player of the Year in Romania
- Gazeta Sporturilor Romania Coach of the Year
- Gazeta Sporturilor Monthly Football Awards
