= Francisc Fabian =

Romanian footballer

Personal information
- Date of birth: 21 October 1917
- Place of birth: Öskii, Hungary
- Date of death: Unknown
- Position: Striker

Senior career*
Years	Team	Apps	(Gls)
1933–1937	Unirea Cluj		
1937–1939	Mociornița București		
1939–1940	Olympia București		
1940–1944	Phoenix Baia Mare		
1945–1946	Mociornița București (Note: The Divizia A 1940–41 was the last season before World War II and the Divizia A 1946–47 was the first one after, so the appearances and goals scored during this period for Mociornița București are not official with the exception of the 1945–46 regional championship.)	5	(0)
1946	Danubiana Roman		
1947	Jiul Petroșani	4	(1)
1947	Ripensia Timișoara		
1948	CFR Timișoara	3	(1)
1948–1949	Ripensia Timișoara		
1950–1952	Dinamo 6 București		
1952	Metalul București		
Total		12	(2)

International career
1945	Romania	1	(1)
- * Club domestic league appearances and goals

Francisc Fabian (born 21 October 1917) was a Romanian football striker. After he retired from playing football he worked at Steaua Bucureşti's youth center where he taught and formed generations of players, which include Marcel Răducanu, Dan Petrescu and Ion Ion. Later he settled in Turda, where he worked at Sticla Arieșul Turda's youth center where he taught and formed Anton Doboș.

== International career ==
Francisc Fabian played one friendly game at international level for Romania, which ended with a 7–2 loss against Hungary with Fabian scoring Romania's first goal.

== Honours ==
Danubiana Roman

- Divizia C: 1946–47
