= Agiu =

Agiu is a Romanian surname. Notable people with the surname include:

- Constantin Agiu (1891–1961), Romanian communist politician
- Mario Agiu (born 1956), Romanian footballer
