= Dragomirești-Vale =

- Commune
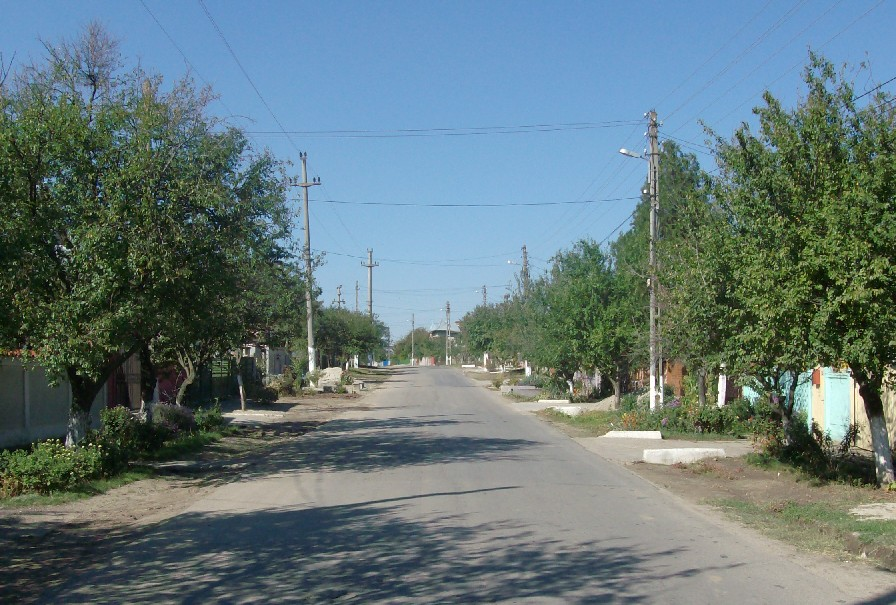
- Main street in Dragomirești-Vale

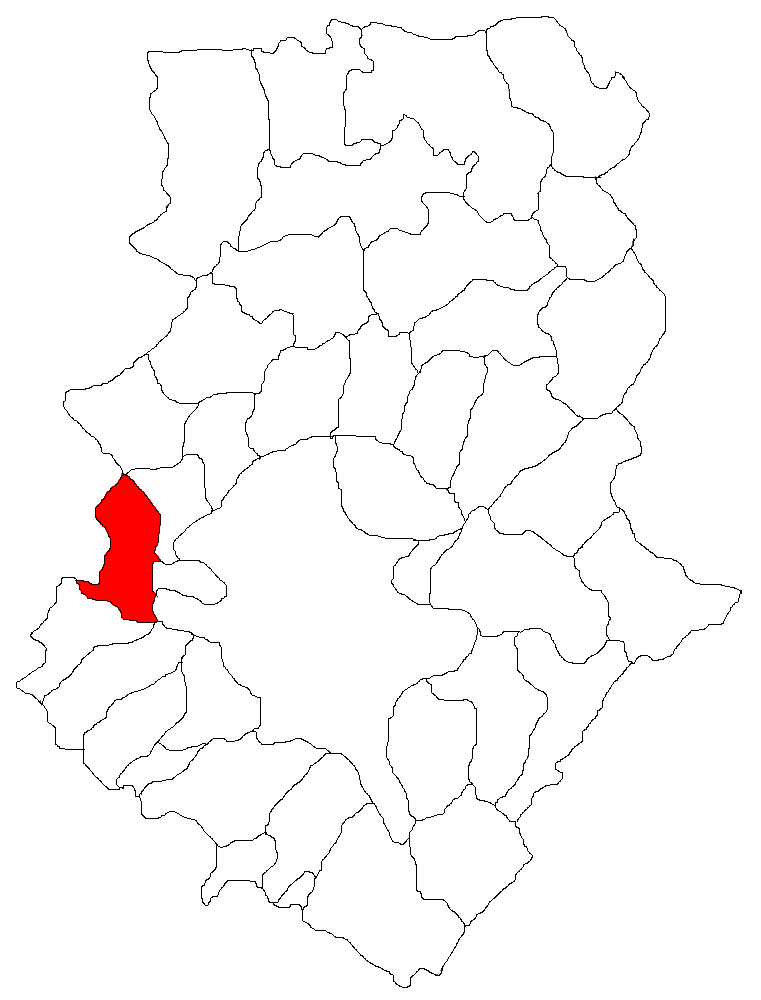
- Location in Ilfov County

- Location in Romania
- Coordinates: 44°28′N 25°56′E
- Country: Romania
- County: Ilfov

Government
  - Mayor (2020–2024): Gheorghe Socol (PNL)
- Area: 31 km^{2} (12 sq mi)
- Elevation: 93 m (305 ft)
- Population (2021-12-01): 6,531
  - Density: 210/km^{2} (550/sq mi)
- Time zone: UTC+02:00 (EET)
  - Summer (DST): UTC+03:00 (EEST)
- Postal code: 077095
- Area code: +(40) 21
- Vehicle reg.: IF
- Website: primariadragomirestivale.ro

Dragomirești-Vale is a commune in the southwestern part of Ilfov County, Muntenia, Romania. Its name is derived from Dragomir, a Romanian name of Slavic origin (from Драгомир, which means "precious and peaceful"), the suffix -ești, and noun Vale, which means "valley".

A medium-size commune, it is composed of 3 villages: Dragomirești-Deal, Dragomirești-Vale, and Zurbaua.

The commune is situated near Bucharest, some 14 km (8.7 mi) away from the city centre and 4 km (2.5 mi) from the Bucharest–Pitești highway. The nearest airports are Henri Coandă International Airport in Otopeni (30 km away), and Aurel Vlaicu International Airport in Băneasa (25 km away).

Historical population
Year	Pop.	±%
2002	4,265	—
2011	5,243	+22.9%
2021	6,531	+24.6%
Source: Census data

== Natives ==
- Radu Troi (born 1949), footballer
