= 1975–76 Divizia A =

58th season of top-tier football league in Romania

Divizia A
- Season: 1975–76
- Champions: Steaua București
- Top goalscorer: Dudu Georgescu (31)

The 1975–76 Divizia A was the fifty-eighth season of Divizia A, the top-level football league of Romania.

== Teams ==
Location of teams in 1975-76 Divizia A

== League table ==
Pos	Team	Pld	W	D	L	GF	GA	GD	Pts	Qualification or relegation
1	Steaua București (C)	34	21	9	4	79	33	+46	51	Qualification to European Cup first round
2	Dinamo București	34	18	8	8	68	35	+33	44	Qualification to UEFA Cup first round
3	ASA Târgu Mureș	34	17	4	13	48	42	+6	38	Qualification to UEFA Cup first round
4	Sportul Studenţesc București	34	14	9	11	52	41	+11	37	Qualification to UEFA Cup first round
5	Politehnica Timișoara	34	14	9	11	54	52	+2	37	Invitation to Balkans Cup
6	Universitatea Craiova	34	13	10	11	41	32	+9	36	
7	SC Bacău	34	14	7	13	37	35	+2	35	
8	FCM Reșița	34	14	6	14	39	55	−16	34	
9	Bihor Oradea	34	14	5	15	43	46	−3	33	
10	FC Constanța	34	12	8	14	34	36	−2	32	
11	Argeș Pitești	34	12	8	14	36	47	−11	32	
12	Jiul Petroșani	34	12	8	14	42	54	−12	32	
13	Politehnica Iași	34	13	5	16	46	50	−4	31	
14	Rapid București	34	12	7	15	40	47	−7	31	
15	UTA Arad	34	13	5	16	46	56	−10	31	
16	Olimpia Satu Mare (R)	34	12	7	15	36	56	−20	31	Relegation to Divizia B
17	CFR Cluj (R)	34	9	10	15	30	39	−9	28	Relegation to Divizia B
18	Universitatea Cluj (R)	34	8	3	23	30	45	−15	19	Relegation to Divizia B

Source: LT
Rules for classification: 1) points; 2) goal difference; 3) number of goals scored
(C) Champions; (R) Relegated

=== Results ===
Home \ Away	ASA	ARG	BAC	BHO	CFR	CON	UCR	DIN	RES	JIU	OLI	PIA	RAP	SPO	STE	POL	UTA	UCL
ASA Târgu Mureș	—	0–0	2–0	2–1	1–0	3–0	1–0	2–0	4–0	2–3	2–0	2–0	1–0	2–0	1–1	1–0	3–2	3–1
Argeș Pitești	2–1	—	2–0	0–0	0–2	4–1	0–1	2–1	2–2	3–0	2–1	2–1	1–0	0–0	0–1	5–1	2–0	3–1
Bacău	0–0	4–0	—	4–0	1–0	2–1	0–0	0–1	2–0	3–0	0–0	3–2	4–1	2–1	2–2	2–0	1–0	1–0
Bihor Oradea	3–1	1–1	1–3	—	2–1	2–1	1–0	1–1	2–0	3–0	3–1	1–0	1–0	2–0	3–2	1–1	5–1	4–0
CFR Cluj	0–2	1–1	1–0	0–0	—	1–1	0–0	3–1	2–0	1–1	5–1	1–1	1–0	1–0	0–1	1–1	1–0	0–0
Constanța	2–0	1–0	1–0	0–1	2–0	—	1–0	0–1	1–0	1–0	0–0	4–0	0–0	2–1	0–1	0–0	4–3	1–0
Universitatea Craiova	1–1	4–0	3–0	1–0	3–1	2–1	—	1–2	3–0	1–1	3–1	2–0	3–0	1–1	2–0	1–1	3–0	1–0
Dinamo București	3–2	7–1	2–0	3–1	4–2	1–1	2–0	—	4–0	5–0	2–0	2–0	3–1	0–1	3–3	2–2	1–1	4–2
FCM Reșița	3–2	0–0	2–0	1–0	1–1	1–0	3–0	2–1	—	2–0	1–0	4–0	2–2	2–0	2–1	1–2	1–1	1–0
Jiul Petroșani	2–3	4–1	2–0	3–0	1–0	1–1	3–1	0–0	2–0	—	1–0	1–1	1–0	7–1	0–1	1–1	2–0	1–0
Olimpia Satu Mare	2–0	1–0	0–0	1–0	2–0	1–4	4–0	2–1	1–2	2–2	—	1–0	2–0	0–0	0–2	2–0	2–0	2–0
Politehnica Iași	3–0	4–0	1–0	4–1	1–0	3–1	1–1	0–1	5–0	4–0	2–2	—	4–1	1–1	2–0	2–0	1–0	2–1
Rapid București	3–0	1–0	1–1	2–0	3–0	0–0	4–2	2–5	2–0	3–1	0–0	5–0	—	2–0	0–3	1–0	2–1	1–0
Sportul Studențesc București	2–0	1–0	0–0	2–0	1–0	1–0	1–1	0–0	8–1	6–1	5–0	3–1	2–2	—	2–2	4–1	5–2	1–0
Steaua București	2–0	1–1	3–0	3–1	3–0	2–1	1–0	1–1	3–1	2–0	8–2	3–0	0–0	4–0	—	4–2	8–0	4–1
Politehnica Timișoara	3–1	2–0	3–1	4–2	2–2	4–1	0–0	0–4	2–0	3–1	3–0	1–0	5–1	2–1	2–2	—	3–0	2–0
UTA Arad	2–0	2–0	3–0	2–0	2–1	1–0	0–0	1–0	2–2	3–0	2–3	3–0	2–0	2–0	3–3	2–1	—	1–2
Universitatea Cluj	1–3	0–1	0–1	1–0	0–1	0–0	1–0	1–0	0–2	0–0	6–0	3–0	2–0	0–1	1–2	6–0	0–2	—

Source: LT (in Romanian)
Legend: Blue = home team win; Yellow = draw; Red = away team win.

== Top goalscorers ==
Rank	Player	Club	Goals
1	Dudu Georgescu	Dinamo București	31
2	Anghel Iordănescu	Steaua București	23
3	Mircea Sandu	Sportul Studenţesc București	21
4	Marin Radu	Argeș Pitești	20
5	Marcel Răducanu	Steaua București	17

== Champion squad ==
Steaua București

Goalkeepers: Dumitru Moraru (24 / 0); Vasile Iordache (13 / 0).
Defenders: Teodor Anghelini (30 / 0); Mario Agiu (29 / 1); Viorel Smarandache (15 / 0); Ștefan Sameș (31 / 1); Iosif Vigu (34 / 3); Gabriel Zahiu (9 / 0).
Midfielders: Tudorel Stoica (16 / 2); Constantin Dumitriu (15 / 0); Ion Dumitru (24 / 7); Ion Ion (25 / 5); Adrian Florea (8 / 1).
Forwards: Anghel Iordănescu (31 / 23); Viorel Năstase (21 / 4); Radu Troi (23 / 4); Marcel Răducanu (31 / 17); Constantin Zamfir (32 / 8); Teodor Botez (8 / 1); Dorin Danciu (2 / 0).
(league appearances and goals listed in brackets)

Manager: Emerich Jenei.

== Attendances ==
#	Club	Average
1	Craiova	26,824
2	FC Rapid	24,294
3	Timișoara	23,118
4	Sportul Studențesc	20,118
5	Steaua	19,471
6	Dinamo 1948	18,118
7	Bihor	15,588
8	Bacău	13,647
9	Iași	13,588
10	UTA Arad	13,000
11	Reșița	11,882
12	Argeș	10,882
13	Târgu Mureș	10,588
14	Satu Mare	10,353
15	CFR Cluj	10,353
16	Constanța	9,706
17	Jiul	6,000
18	U Cluj	5,676

== See also ==
- 1975–76 Divizia B
- 1975–76 Divizia C
- 1975–76 County Championship
