= UEFA Euro 1980 qualifying Group 3 =

Football tournament qualification stage

Standings and results for Group 3 of the UEFA Euro 1980 qualifying tournament.

Group 3 consisted of Cyprus, Romania, Spain and Yugoslavia. Group winners were Spain, who pipped Yugoslavia by a single point.

== Final table ==
Pos	Team	Pld	W	D	L	GF	GA	GD	Pts	Qualification	(Spain)	(Socialist Federal Republic of Yugoslavia)	(Romania)	(Cyprus)
1	Spain	6	4	1	1	13	5	+8	9	Qualify for final tournament	—	0–1	1–0	5–0
2	Yugoslavia	6	4	0	2	14	6	+8	8		1–2	—	2–1	5–0
3	Romania	6	2	2	2	9	8	+1	6		2–2	3–2	—	2–0
4	Cyprus	6	0	1	5	2	19	−17	1		1–3	0–3	1–1	—

Source: UEFA
Rules for classification: Qualification tiebreakers

== Results ==
4 October 1978

Yugoslavia	1–2	Spain
Halilhodžić 44'		Juanito 20'; Santillana 32'

Maksimir Stadium, Zagreb
Attendance: 41,539
Referee: Linemayr (AUT)

25 October 1978

Romania	3–2	Yugoslavia
Sameş 62', 68'; Iordănescu 75' (pen.)		Petrović 22' (pen.); Desnica 90'

Ghencea Stadium, Bucharest
Attendance: 24,090
Referee: Lattanzi (ITA)

15 November 1978

Spain	1–0	Romania
Asensi 9'

Estadio Luis Casanova, Valencia
Attendance: 37,019
Referee: Keizer (NED)

13 December 1978

Spain	5–0	Cyprus
Asensi 9' del Bosque 10'; Santillana 52', 77'; Rubén Cano 65'

El Helmántico, Villares de la Reina
Attendance: 14,974
Referee: Bonett (MLT)

1 April 1979

Cyprus	0–3	Yugoslavia
		Vujović 40', 79'; Šurjak 82' (pen.)

Makario Stadium, Nicosia
Attendance: 3,378
Referee: Padar (HUN)

4 April 1979

Romania	2–2	Spain
Georgescu 57' (pen.), 65'		Dani 59', 70'

Ion Oblemenco Stadium, Craiova
Attendance: 34,506
Referee: van Langenhove (BEL)

13 May 1979

Cyprus	1–1	Romania
Kaiafas 31'		Augustin 30'

Tsirion Stadium, Limassol
Attendance: 6,488
Referee: Parmakov (BUL)

10 October 1979

Spain	0–1	Yugoslavia
		Šurjak 5'

Estadio Luis Casanova, Valencia
Attendance: 28,078
Referee: McGinlay (SCO)

31 October 1979

Yugoslavia	2–1	Romania
Vujović 48'; Slišković 50'		Răducanu 79'

Gradski stadion, Kosovska Mitrovica
Attendance: 24,397
Referee: Redelfs (FRG)

14 November 1979

Yugoslavia	5–0	Cyprus
Kranjčar 32', 50'; Vujović 60'; Petrović 75'; Savić 87'

Gradski stadion, Novi Sad
Attendance: 14,134
Referee: Zhezhov (BUL)

18 November 1979

Romania	2–0	Cyprus
Mulţescu 40'; Răducanu 75'

Stadionul Dinamo, Bucharest
Attendance: 3,000
Referee: Krchnák (CZE)

9 December 1979

Cyprus	1–3	Spain
Vrahimis 69'		Villar 5'; Santillana 41'; Saura 89'

Tsirion Stadium, Limassol
Attendance: 9,128
Referee: Bucek (AUT)

== Goalscorers ==
There were 38 goals scored in 12 matches, for an average of 3.17 goals per match.

4 goals

- (Spain) Santillana
- (Socialist Federal Republic of Yugoslavia) Zlatko Vujović

2 goals

- (Romania) Dudu Georgescu
- (Romania) Marcel Răducanu
- (Romania) Ștefan Sameș
- (Spain) Juan Manuel Asensi
- (Spain) Dani
- (Socialist Federal Republic of Yugoslavia) Zlatko Kranjčar
- (Socialist Federal Republic of Yugoslavia) Vladimir Petrović
- (Socialist Federal Republic of Yugoslavia) Ivica Šurjak

1 goal

- (Cyprus) Sotiris Kaiafas
- (Cyprus) Fivos Vrahimis
- (Romania) Ionel Augustin
- (Romania) Anghel Iordănescu
- (Romania) Gheorghe Mulțescu
- (Spain) Rubén Cano
- (Spain) Vicente del Bosque
- (Spain) Juanito
- (Spain) Enrique Saura
- (Spain) Ángel María Villar
- (Socialist Federal Republic of Yugoslavia) Damir Desnica
- (Socialist Federal Republic of Yugoslavia) Vahid Halilhodžić
- (Socialist Federal Republic of Yugoslavia) Dušan Savić
- (Socialist Federal Republic of Yugoslavia) Blaž Slišković
