= Silviu Iorgulescu =

Romanian footballer

Personal information
- Full name: Silviu Cătălin Iorgulescu
- Date of birth: 28 July 1946 (age 80)
- Place of birth: Bucharest, Romania
- Height: 1.91 m (6 ft 3 in)
- Position: Goalkeeper

Youth career
- 1958–1966: Dinamo București

Senior career*
Years	Team	Apps	(Gls)
1966–1967	Siderurgistul Galați		
1967–1969	Politehnica Galați	40	(0)
1969–1971	Oțelul Galați	31	(0)
1971–1973	Metalul București	42	(0)
1973–1980	UTA Arad (Note: The statistics for the 1979–80 Divizia B season are unavailable.)	138	(0)
1980–1981	SC Bacău	2	(0)
Total		253	(0)

International career
1974–1975	Romania (Note: Including one appearance for Romania's Olympic team.)	5	(0)

Managerial career
- 1981–1982: UTA Arad
- 1982–1984: CFR Arad
- 1984–1985: CSM Caransebeș
- 1996: Békéscsaba
- * Club domestic league appearances and goals

Silviu Cătălin Iorgulescu (born 28 July 1946) is a Romanian former footballer who played as a goalkeeper.

== International career ==
Silviu Iorgulescu played four games at international level for Romania, including one appearance in a 3–1 victory against Greece at the Balkan Cup. He also played once for Romania's Olympic team in a 2–1 victory against Denmark at the 1976 Summer Olympics qualifiers.
