= 1973–76 Balkan Cup =

Tournament details
- Dates: 18 April 1973 – 28 November 1976
- Teams: 4

Final positions
- Champions: Bulgaria (3rd title)
- Runners-up: Romania

Tournament statistics
- Matches played: 6
- Goals scored: 25 (4.17 per match)
- Top goal scorer(s): (Turkey) Cemil Turan (4 goals)

The 1973–76 Balkan Cup was the 11th Balkan Cup football tournament. It was the first tournament played in a knockout system with semi-finals and finals. It was played between April 1973 and November 1976 between Turkey, Romania, Bulgaria and Greece. The tournament was won by Bulgaria over Romania via the away goal rule, the score being 3–3 in the two legs of the final. The top goalscorer was Cemil Turan from Turkey with 4 goals.

== Bracket ==
Semi-finals
1	Turkey	5	1	6
4	Bulgaria	2	5	7
3	Romania	3	1	4
2	Greece	1	1	2

Final
Bulgaria	1	2	3
Romania	0	3	3

== Semi-finals ==
Team 1	Agg.	Team 2	1st leg	2nd leg
Turkey	6–7	Bulgaria	5–2	1–5
Romania	4–2	Greece	3–1	1–1

=== First leg ===
18 April 1973

Turkey	5–2	Bulgaria
Oğuz 5'; Turan 47', 66', 86'; Kurt 56'	Report	Panov 39'; Milanov 56'

İzmir Atatürk Stadium, İzmir
Attendance: 65,000
Referee: Nikos Zlatanos (Greece)

29 May 1974

Romania	3–1	Greece
Iordănescu 2', 32'; Lucescu 85'	Report	Sarafis 11'

Stadionul 23 August, Bucharest
Attendance: 40,000
Referee: Ziya Türkdoğan (Turkey)

=== Second leg ===
8 May 1974

Bulgaria	5–1	Turkey
Bonev 12'; Kovis 48' (o.g.); Zhechev 67'; Panov 76'; Grigorov 79'	Report	Turan 68'

Vasil Levski National Stadium, Sofia
Attendance: 25,000
Referee: Kevork Ghemigean (Romania)

24 September 1975

Greece	1–1	Romania
Sarafis 84'	Report	Dumitru 27'

National Kaftanzoglio Stadium, Thessaloniki
Attendance: 15,000
Referee: Miloš Čajić (Yugoslavia)

== Final ==
Team 1	Agg.	Team 2	1st leg	2nd leg
Bulgaria	3–3	Romania	1–0	2–3

=== First leg ===
12 May 1976

Bulgaria	1–0	Romania
Vasilev 49'	Report

Stadion Ivaylo, Veliko Tarnovo
Attendance: 30,000
Referee: Orhan Cebe (Turkey)

=== Second leg ===
28 November 1976

Romania	3–2	Bulgaria
Troi 47'; Bölöni 54'; Mulțescu 78'	Report	Garabski 13'; Zhelyazkov 69'

Stadionul 23 August, Bucharest
Attendance: 40,000
Referee: Teodoros Tsanaklidis (Greece)

== Winner ==
1973-76 Balkan Cup

Bulgaria
Third title

== Statistics ==
=== Goalscorers ===
There were 25 goals scored in 6 matches, for an average of 4.17 goals per match.

4 goals

- (Turkey) Cemil Turan

2 goals

- (Bulgaria) Pavel Panov
- (Greece) Stavros Sarafis
- (Romania) Anghel Iordănescu

1 goal

- (Bulgaria) Andrey Zhelyazkov
- (Bulgaria) Atanas Garabski
- (Bulgaria) Bozhidar Grigorov
- (Bulgaria) Dobromir Zhechev
- (Bulgaria) Hristo Bonev
- (Bulgaria) Kiril Milanov
- (Bulgaria) Tsonyo Vasilev
- (Turkey) Mehmet Oğuz
- (Turkey) Metin Kurt
- (Romania) Ion Dumitru
- (Romania) Gheorghe Mulțescu
- (Romania) László Bölöni
- (Romania) Mircea Lucescu
- (Romania) Radu Troi

1 own goal

- (Turkey) Nikos Kovis (against Bulgaria)
