= Ion Dumitru =

Romanian footballer

Liță Dumitru
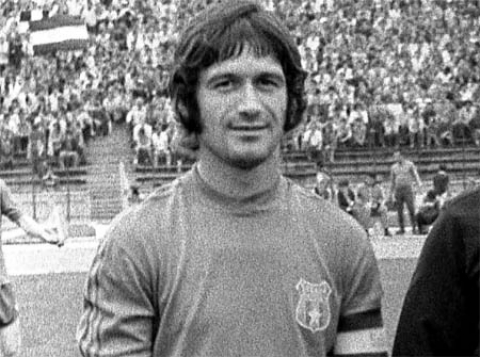
- Dumitru with Steaua Bucharest

Personal information
- Full name: Ion Dumitru
- Date of birth: 2 January 1950 (age 76)
- Place of birth: Bucharest, Romania
- Height: 1.79 m (5 ft 10 in)
- Position: Midfielder

Team information
- Current team: Concordia Chiajna (technical director)

Youth career
- 1963–1964: Confecția București
- 1964–1967: Rapid București

Senior career*
Years	Team	Apps	(Gls)
1967–1972	Rapid București	110	(11)
1972–1980	Steaua București	213	(47)
1980–1982	Politehnica Timişoara	46	(2)
1982–1983	Universitatea Craiova	4	(0)
1983–1984	CFR Timişoara		
1984–1985	Politehnica Timişoara	33	(1)
1986–1988	Rapid București	37	(3)
1988–1989	Würzburger Kickers		
Total		443	(64)

International career
1971–1976	Romania Olympic	7	(2)
1970–1980	Romania	50	(10)

Managerial career
- 1985: Politehnica Timişoara (player/coach)
- 1987–1988: Rapid București (player/coach)
- 1989–1993: Würzburger Kickers
- 1994–1995: Național București
- 1995–1996: Jiul Petroșani
- 1996–1997: Rapid București
- 1998: Rocar București
- 1999: Al-Jaish Damascus
- 2000: Al-Ta'ee
- 2000–2001: Politehnica Iași
- 2001: Callatis Mangalia
- 2001–2002: Romania U19
- 2002–2003: VfR Heilbronn
- 2003–2005: Rapid București (youth)
- 2007–2008: Concordia Chiajna
- 2009–2010: Concordia Chiajna
- 2011: Steaua II București
- 2013–2014: Romania U18
- 2015–2017: Concordia Chiajna (youth)
- 2016–2017: Concordia II Chiajna
- 2017–2024: Kalonji Soccer Academy (youth)
- 2024–: Concordia Chiajna (technical director)
- 2024–2025: Concordia Chiajna (caretaker)
- * Club domestic league appearances and goals

Ion Dumitru (born 2 January 1950), commonly known as Liță Dumitru, is a Romanian former professional football player and manager who is technical director at Liga II club Concordia Chiajna. He played as a midfielder.

== Career ==
A Romanian international, Dumitru represented his country at the 1970 FIFA World Cup. Regarded as one of Romania's greatest players he won the Romanian Footballer of the Year in 1973 and 1975.

== Career statistics ==
Appearances and goals by national team and year
National team	Year	Apps	Goals
Romania	1970	9	0
Romania	1971	4	0
Romania	1972	7	0
Romania	1973	5	2
Romania	1974	4	1
Romania	1975	7	1
Romania	1976	2	0
Romania	1977	8	5
Romania	1978	1	0
Romania	1979	2	1
Romania	1980	1	0
Total		50	10

Scores and results table. "Score" indicates the score after the player's goal:

#	Date	Venue	Opponent	Score	Result	Competition
1	6 May 1973	Stadiumi Qemal Stafa, Tirana, Albania	Albania	1–0	4–1	1974 FIFA World Cup qualification
2	14 October 1973	Stadionul 23 August, Bucharest, Romania	Finland	1–0	9–0	1974 FIFA World Cup qualification
3	23 July 1974	Stadionul 1 Mai, Constanța, Romania	Japan	2–0	4–1	Friendly
4	24 September 1975	Kaftanzoglio Stadio, Thessaloniki, Greece	Greece	1–0	1–1	1973–76 Balkan Cup
5	23 March 1977	Stadionul Steaua, Bucharest, Romania	Turkey	2–0	4–0	1977–80 Balkan Cup
6	27 April 1977	Stadionul Steaua, Bucharest, Romania	East Germany	1–1	1–1	Friendly
7	21 September 1977	Stadionul Steaua, Bucharest, Romania	Greece	1–0	6–1	Friendly
8	21 September 1977	Stadionul Steaua, Bucharest, Romania	Greece	3–1	6–1	Friendly
9	21 September 1977	Stadionul Steaua, Bucharest, Romania	Greece	5–1	6–1	Friendly
10	21 March 1979	Stadionul Steaua, Bucharest, Romania	Greece	1–0	3–0	Friendly

== Honours ==
=== Player ===
Rapid București

- Cupa României: 1971–72

Steaua București

- Divizia A: 1975–76, 1977–78
- Cupa României: 1975–76, 1978–79

Politehnica Timișoara

- Cupa României runner-up: 1980–81

Universitatea Craiova

- Cupa României: 1982–83

=== Individual ===
- Romanian Footballer of the Year: 1973, 1975; runner-up 1971

=== Coach ===
Würzburger Kickers

- Landesliga Bayern-Nord: 1989–90

Jiul Petroșani

- Divizia B: 1995–96

Al-Jaish

- Syrian League: 1998–99
- Arab Club Championship runner-up: 1999
