= 1977–78 Divizia A =

60th season of top-tier football league in Romania

Divizia A
- Season: 1977–78
- Champions: Steaua București
- Top goalscorer: Dudu Georgescu (24)

The 1977–78 Divizia A was the sixtieth season of Divizia A, the top-level football league of Romania.

== Teams ==
Location of teams in 1977-78 Divizia A

== League table ==
| Pos | Team | Pld | W | D | L | GF | GA | GD | Pts | Qualification or relegation |
|---|---|---|---|---|---|---|---|---|---|---|
| 1 | Steaua București (C) | 34 | 17 | 7 | 10 | 75 | 49 | +26 | 41 | Qualification to European Cup preliminary round |
| 2 | Argeș Pitești | 34 | 18 | 5 | 11 | 60 | 49 | +11 | 41 | Qualification to UEFA Cup first round |
| 3 | Politehnica Timișoara | 34 | 16 | 6 | 12 | 48 | 38 | +10 | 38 | Qualification to UEFA Cup first round |
| 4 | Sportul Studenţesc București | 34 | 18 | 2 | 14 | 49 | 42 | +7 | 38 | Invitation to Balkans Cup |
| 5 | Dinamo București | 34 | 15 | 6 | 13 | 50 | 40 | +10 | 36 | |
| 6 | Universitatea Craiova | 34 | 14 | 7 | 13 | 43 | 34 | +9 | 35 | Qualification to Cup Winners' Cup first round |
| 7 | Jiul Petroșani | 34 | 14 | 6 | 14 | 53 | 49 | +4 | 34 | |
| 8 | Corvinul Hunedoara | 34 | 11 | 12 | 11 | 44 | 43 | +1 | 34 | |
| 9 | CS Târgoviște | 34 | 13 | 8 | 13 | 28 | 33 | −5 | 34 | |
| 10 | UTA Arad | 34 | 13 | 8 | 13 | 49 | 55 | −6 | 34 | |
| 11 | SC Bacău | 34 | 13 | 8 | 13 | 47 | 55 | −8 | 34 | |
| 12 | ASA Târgu Mureș | 34 | 13 | 7 | 14 | 48 | 40 | +8 | 33 | |
| 13 | Olimpia Satu Mare | 34 | 14 | 5 | 15 | 41 | 47 | −6 | 33 | |
| 14 | Bihor Oradea | 34 | 15 | 3 | 16 | 39 | 56 | −17 | 33 | |
| 15 | Politehnica Iași | 34 | 12 | 8 | 14 | 43 | 39 | +4 | 32 | |
| 16 | FC Constanța (R) | 34 | 14 | 4 | 16 | 42 | 49 | −7 | 32 | Relegation to Divizia B |
| 17 | Petrolul Ploiești (R) | 34 | 11 | 8 | 15 | 41 | 46 | −5 | 30 | Relegation to Divizia B |
| 18 | FCM Reșița (R) | 34 | 8 | 4 | 22 | 29 | 65 | −36 | 20 | Relegation to Divizia B |

Source: LT
Rules for classification: 1) points; 2) goal difference; 3) number of goals scored
(C) Champions; (R) Relegated

=== Results ===
| Home \ Away | ASA | ARG | BAC | BHO | CON | COR | UCR | DIN | RES | JIU | OLI | PET | PIA | SPO | STE | POL | TAR | UTA |
|---|---|---|---|---|---|---|---|---|---|---|---|---|---|---|---|---|---|---|
| ASA Târgu Mureș | — | 3–0 | 4–0 | 4–1 | 2–0 | 0–1 | 1–0 | 1–1 | 4–1 | 1–1 | 4–2 | 3–1 | 5–0 | 2–0 | 2–3 | 3–1 | 1–0 | 1–1 |
| Argeș Pitești | 4–2 | — | 4–1 | 3–1 | 1–1 | 0–0 | 2–1 | 1–0 | 2–0 | 2–1 | 3–2 | 4–3 | 3–2 | 4–2 | 3–1 | 2–1 | 2–0 | 5–0 |
| Bacău | 2–1 | 3–1 | — | 3–0 | 3–1 | 3–1 | 3–1 | 1–0 | 0–0 | 4–0 | 1–1 | 1–0 | 2–1 | 2–0 | 0–0 | 2–2 | 2–0 | 3–1 |
| Bihor Oradea | 2–1 | 2–1 | 4–1 | — | 0–0 | 2–1 | 2–1 | 2–1 | 3–0 | 2–0 | 2–1 | 1–0 | 1–0 | 0–1 | 2–1 | 1–3 | 1–0 | 2–1 |
| Constanța | 1–0 | 1–2 | 1–0 | 1–1 | — | 4–1 | 1–0 | 2–4 | 4–0 | 1–0 | 2–0 | 3–1 | 2–0 | 1–3 | 3–1 | 3–1 | 1–0 | 2–1 |
| Corvinul Hunedoara | 1–0 | 2–2 | 3–1 | 7–1 | 2–0 | — | 1–1 | 1–1 | 5–1 | 1–1 | 1–0 | 1–0 | 0–0 | 1–0 | 1–1 | 2–0 | 0–0 | 2–1 |
| Universitatea Craiova | 3–0 | 1–0 | 2–0 | 2–0 | 5–1 | 1–1 | — | 3–2 | 1–0 | 0–1 | 1–0 | 2–0 | 0–0 | 3–0 | 3–0 | 1–0 | 2–0 | 1–1 |
| Dinamo București | 1–1 | 1–0 | 0–0 | 2–0 | 1–2 | 3–1 | 2–0 | — | 1–0 | 2–1 | 3–2 | 2–1 | 1–0 | 0–1 | 0–1 | 4–2 | 3–0 | 3–1 |
| FCM Reșița | 2–0 | 1–2 | 4–1 | 3–0 | 0–0 | 4–1 | 2–1 | 0–3 | — | 3–2 | 1–3 | 1–1 | 0–2 | 0–2 | 0–4 | 1–0 | 3–0 | 0–0 |
| Jiul Petroșani | 0–1 | 1–1 | 5–2 | 3–1 | 2–1 | 1–0 | 2–2 | 4–1 | 3–0 | — | 3–0 | 3–0 | 2–1 | 1–0 | 4–2 | 2–0 | 1–1 | 3–0 |
| Olimpia Satu Mare | 1–0 | 3–1 | 2–1 | 2–1 | 2–1 | 1–1 | 1–0 | 0–0 | 2–1 | 2–0 | — | 1–0 | 1–0 | 2–0 | 3–2 | 0–0 | 2–2 | 2–0 |
| Petrolul Ploiești | 0–0 | 2–0 | 1–1 | 4–0 | 4–1 | 0–0 | 2–0 | 3–2 | 2–0 | 2–0 | 2–0 | — | 1–1 | 3–0 | 0–3 | 1–0 | 0–0 | 4–3 |
| Politehnica Iași | 0–0 | 6–1 | 4–0 | 4–2 | 1–0 | 1–0 | 0–1 | 2–1 | 3–0 | 1–0 | 3–0 | 0–0 | — | 1–1 | 3–2 | 0–1 | 3–1 | 0–0 |
| Sportul Studențesc București | 3–0 | 1–3 | 1–1 | 2–0 | 1–0 | 3–1 | 3–1 | 0–2 | 2–0 | 3–1 | 3–0 | 3–2 | 2–1 | — | 2–1 | 2–0 | 2–0 | 3–2 |
| Steaua București | 3–1 | 1–1 | 3–0 | 0–1 | 5–0 | 2–2 | 3–1 | 3–3 | 4–0 | 4–1 | 2–0 | 4–1 | 4–2 | 2–1 | — | 2–2 | 2–1 | 5–0 |
| Politehnica Timișoara | 2–0 | 1–0 | 2–0 | 1–0 | 2–0 | 2–0 | 1–1 | 1–0 | 3–0 | 1–1 | 3–2 | 4–0 | 1–0 | 2–1 | 4–1 | — | 2–0 | 1–1 |
| Târgoviște | 0–0 | 1–0 | 3–1 | 1–0 | 1–0 | 1–0 | 1–0 | 2–0 | 1–0 | 4–1 | 1–0 | 0–0 | 0–0 | 1–0 | 1–1 | 3–1 | — | 2–0 |
| UTA Arad | 2–0 | 1–0 | 2–2 | 1–1 | 2–1 | 5–2 | 1–1 | 1–0 | 3–1 | 3–2 | 2–1 | 2–0 | 4–1 | 2–1 | 1–2 | 2–1 | 2–0 | — |

Source: LT (in Romanian)
Legend: Blue = home team win; Yellow = draw; Red = away team win.

== Top goalscorers ==
| Position | Player | Club | Goals |
|---|---|---|---|
| 1 | Dudu Georgescu | Dinamo București | 24 |
| 2 | Anghel Iordănescu | Steaua București | 19 |
| 3 | Marcel Răducanu | Steaua București | 18 |
| 4 | Marin Radu | Argeș Pitești | 15 |
| 5 | Ladislau Broșovschi | UT Arad | 13 |
| 5 | Petre Buduru | FC Constanța | 13 |

== Champion squad ==
Steaua București

Goalkeepers: Dumitru Moraru (26 / 0); Vasile Iordache (14 / 0).
Defenders: Teodor Anghelini (32 / 0); Mario Agiu (33 / 1); Ștefan Sameș (21 / 1); Iosif Vigu (34 / 0); Ion Nițu (10 / 0); Florin Marin (10 / 0).
Midfielders: Gabriel Zahiu (22 / 12); Ion Ion (24 / 1); Ion Dumitru (24 / 6); Tudorel Stoica (28 / 1).
Forwards: Anghel Iordănescu (28 / 19); Radu Troi (26 / 5); Marcel Răducanu (31 / 18); Viorel Năstase (12 / 6); Vasile Aelenei (8 / 0); Adrian Ionescu (17 / 1); Constantin Zamfir (24 / 3).
(league appearances and goals listed in brackets)

Manager: Emerich Jenei.

== See also ==
- 1977–78 Divizia B
- 1977–78 Divizia C
- 1977–78 County Championship
