= 1969–70 Divizia B =

Divizia B
- Season: 1969–70
- Country: Romania
- Teams: 32 (2x16)
- Promoted: Progresul București; CFR Timișoara
- Relegated: Chimia Suceava; Chimia Vâlcea; Gloria Bârlad; Metalul Turnu Severin
- Matches: 480
- Goals: 1,196 (2.49 per match)
- Biggest home win: Progresul 6–0 Ceahlăul; Olimpia O. 6–0 Severin
- Biggest away win: Sportul 1–4 Portul; Oțelul 0–3 Metalul; Poiana 0–3 Progresul; Severin 1–4 Gaz Metan; Severin 1–4 Cugir
- Highest scoring: Bârlad 6–4 Flacăra
- Longest winning run: 4 matches: Politehnica Galați; Metalurgistul Cugir; CFR Timișoara
- Longest unbeaten run: 11 matches: Progresul București
- Longest winless run: 12 matches: Vagonul Arad
- Longest losing run: 9 matches: Metalul Turnu Severin

The 1969–70 Divizia B was the 30th season of the second tier of the Romanian football league system.

The format has been maintained to two series, each of them having 16 teams. At the end of the season the winners of the series promoted to Divizia A and the last two places from each series relegated to Divizia C.

== Team changes ==
=== To Divizia B ===
Promoted from Divizia C

- Metalul Târgoviște
- Olimpia Satu Mare
- Știința Bacău
- Minerul Anina

Relegated from Divizia A

- Progresul București
- Vagonul Arad

=== From Divizia B ===
Relegated to Divizia C

- CFR Pașcani
- Medicina Cluj
- Electronica Obor București
- IS Câmpia Turzii

Promoted to Divizia A

- Steagul Roșu Brașov
- CFR Cluj

=== Renamed teams ===
AS Cugir was renamed as Metalurgistul Cugir.

Politehnica București was renamed as Sportul Studențesc București.

== Serie I ==
=== League table ===
Pos	Team	Pld	W	D	L	GF	GA	GD	Pts	Promotion or relegation
1	Progresul București (C, P)	30	17	7	6	54	17	+37	41	Promotion to Divizia A
2	Metalul Târgoviște	30	13	7	10	45	39	+6	33	
3	Politehnica Galați	30	13	6	11	35	40	−5	32	
4	Portul Constanța	30	13	4	13	42	43	−1	30	
5	Progresul Brăila	30	13	3	14	48	44	+4	29	
6	Sportul Studențesc	30	11	7	12	44	41	+3	29	
7	Metalul București	30	10	9	11	37	35	+2	29	
8	Flacăra Moreni	30	11	7	12	36	37	−1	29	
9	Oțelul Galați	30	10	9	11	35	38	−3	29	
10	Metrom Brașov	30	11	7	12	34	38	−4	29	
11	Poiana Câmpina	30	11	7	12	36	40	−4	29	
12	Ceahlăul Piatra Neamț	30	13	3	14	34	45	−11	29	
13	Dunărea Giurgiu	30	11	7	12	32	44	−12	29	
14	Știința Bacău	30	10	8	12	30	30	0	28	
15	Chimia Suceava (R)	30	11	6	13	28	32	−4	28	Relegation to Divizia C
16	Gloria Bârlad (R)	30	10	7	13	42	49	−7	27	Relegation to Divizia C

Source: romaniansoccer.ro
Rules for classification: 1) Points 2) Goal difference; 3) Goals scored.
(C) Champions; (P) Promoted; (R) Relegated

=== Serie I results ===
Home \ Away	CEA	CSV	DGR	FLA	GLO	MET	TGV	MBV	OȚE	CMP	PGL	POR	BRĂ	PRO	SPO	ȘTI
Ceahlăul Piatra Neamț	—	1–0	2–0	2–0	2–2	2–1	2–1	1–0	2–0	1–0	0–2	4–2	3–1	0–1	2–0	0–0
Chimia Suceava	2–0	—	4–0	1–1	3–2	1–0	1–0	1–0	0–0	0–1	1–0	2–0	0–0	2–0	2–0	1–1
Dunărea Giurgiu	3–1	2–1	—	3–1	1–1	0–0	2–1	2–2	1–1	1–0	4–0	0–0	1–0	2–0	1–0	1–0
Flacăra Moreni	2–0	2–0	2–0	—	1–0	3–1	0–1	2–0	1–0	3–0	0–0	2–0	1–1	0–0	4–0	1–0
Gloria Bârlad	3–1	2–1	0–0	6–4	—	1–0	3–4	1–0	2–0	2–1	1–1	1–0	3–1	1–1	2–2	3–0
Metalul București	2–0	0–0	1–2	1–1	2–1	—	3–3	2–0	2–0	2–0	1–2	3–0	4–2	0–0	0–2	1–0
Metalul Târgoviște	3–1	5–1	2–1	1–1	2–0	1–3	—	1–0	4–2	2–1	0–1	1–0	3–2	1–0	1–0	1–1
Metrom Brașov	1–1	2–0	2–0	3–0	2–2	0–0	1–1	—	1–0	1–1	3–1	1–0	4–2	2–1	1–0	2–1
Oțelul Galați	2–1	2–0	4–1	3–1	1–0	0–3	0–0	2–1	—	2–2	2–1	4–1	4–2	0–0	2–1	1–1
Poiana Câmpina	1–0	3–0	4–1	1–0	4–1	1–1	1–1	0–1	1–0	—	2–1	1–1	1–0	0–3	1–1	2–1
Politehnica Galați	0–1	0–2	2–1	2–1	3–0	2–0	1–0	4–1	1–1	0–0	—	3–2	2–1	1–1	1–0	2–2
Portul Constanța	4–0	1–1	3–1	2–1	1–0	0–0	3–2	2–2	1–0	6–3	3–0	—	1–0	1–0	2–0	2–0
Progresul Brăila	3–1	2–0	3–1	3–1	5–1	3–0	2–0	1–0	1–1	2–0	4–0	2–0	—	0–2	2–0	1–0
Progresul București	6–0	1–0	3–0	4–0	2–0	3–0	1–0	4–0	3–0	4–0	2–0	2–0	5–1	—	1–1	2–1
Sportul Studențesc	3–1	2–0	4–0	2–0	2–1	4–4	2–2	2–0	3–1	1–1	3–0	1–4	3–1	2–2	—	3–1
Știința Bacău	0–2	2–1	0–0	0–0	2–0	1–0	3–1	3–1	0–0	1–0	1–2	3–0	2–0	2–0	1–0	—

Source: www.rsssf.com
Legend: Blue = home team win; Yellow = draw; Red = away team win.

=== Serie I positions by round ===
Team ╲ Round	1	2	3	4	5	6	7	8	9	10	11	12	13	14	15	16	17	18	19	20	21	22	23	24	25	26	27	28	29	30
Ceahlăul Piatra Neamț	16	16	14	9	7	10	11	11	12	13	15	14	14	14	15	15	13	14	15	15	13	12	12	10	13	11	14	10	16	11
Chimia Suceava	5	7	5	4	6	9	6	9	8	8	9	11	10	8	10	12	8	11	10	11	8	11	11	9	10	13	9	12	12	14
Dunărea Giurgiu	13	11	7	11	10	8	9	6	5	6	4	8	5	9	6	3	6	6	4	5	9	8	9	12	14	14	11	15	9	12
Flacăra Moreni	6	10	12	8	4	5	5	5	6	5	7	6	3	4	4	6	4	3	3	3	3	5	4	3	3	5	7	9	8	8
Gloria Bârlad	15	12	10	10	12	13	10	10	13	14	13	12	13	12	13	13	14	16	14	16	16	16	16	16	16	15	16	16	13	16
Metalul București	3	2	2	2	3	2	1	1	2	2	2	2	2	2	3	5	3	4	5	4	6	3	7	4	6	4	6	5	6	7
Metalul Târgoviște	4	5	4	5	5	6	8	8	7	7	6	4	4	5	5	4	2	2	2	2	2	2	2	2	2	2	2	2	2	2
Metrom Brașov	8	4	6	6	9	7	7	7	10	10	8	10	9	7	8	8	9	10	13	12	15	14	15	14	9	12	10	13	14	10
Oțelul Galați	11	13	15	16	14	11	13	13	11	12	11	9	11	11	11	10	11	8	8	7	10	6	8	6	5	7	8	6	7	9
Poiana Câmpina	9	15	13	14	16	14	14	12	9	9	10	5	8	6	9	9	10	12	11	8	11	7	5	7	7	10	13	14	15	15
Politehnica Galați	2	3	3	1	2	1	2	2	4	3	3	7	7	3	2	2	5	5	9	6	4	9	10	11	8	6	3	4	4	3
Portul Constanța	1	1	1	3	1	3	3	4	3	4	5	3	6	10	7	7	7	7	7	10	7	4	3	5	4	3	4	3	3	4
Progresul Brăila	10	9	11	13	11	12	15	15	14	11	12	13	12	13	12	11	12	9	6	9	5	10	6	8	11	8	5	7	5	5
Progresul București	14	6	8	7	8	4	4	3	1	1	1	1	1	1	1	1	1	1	1	1	1	1	1	1	1	1	1	1	1	1
Sportul Studențesc	12	14	16	15	13	15	12	14	15	15	16	15	15	15	14	14	15	13	12	14	12	15	13	13	12	9	12	8	10	6
Știința Bacău	7	8	9	12	15	16	16	16	16	16	14	16	16	16	16	16	16	15	16	13	14	13	14	15	15	16	15	11	11	13

== Serie II ==
=== League table ===
Pos	Team	Pld	W	D	L	GF	GA	GD	Pts	Promotion or relegation
1	CFR Timișoara (C, P)	30	14	9	7	44	23	+21	37	Promotion to Divizia A
2	CSM Sibiu	30	14	9	7	35	26	+9	37	
3	Minerul Baia Mare	30	15	6	9	28	14	+14	36	
4	Politehnica Timișoara	30	14	6	10	53	38	+15	34	
5	CSM Reșița	30	14	6	10	40	29	+11	34	
6	Olimpia Satu Mare	30	14	4	12	35	34	+1	32	
7	Electroputere Craiova	30	13	5	12	34	48	−14	31	
8	Vagonul Arad	30	11	8	11	25	25	0	30	
9	Minerul Anina	30	14	1	15	52	42	+10	29	
10	Metalul Hunedoara	30	11	6	13	36	33	+3	28	
11	Metalurgistul Cugir	30	12	4	14	30	34	−4	28	
12	Gaz Metan Mediaș	30	13	2	15	38	44	−6	28	
13	Olimpia Oradea	30	11	5	14	48	53	−5	27	
14	CFR Arad	30	11	5	14	39	45	−6	27	
15	Chimia Râmnicu Vâlcea (R)	30	11	4	15	28	40	−12	26	Relegation to Divizia C
16	Metalul Turnu Severin (R)	30	7	2	21	21	58	−37	16	Relegation to Divizia C

Source: romaniansoccer.ro
Rules for classification: 1) Points 2) Goal difference; 3) Goals scored.
(C) Champions; (P) Promoted; (R) Relegated

=== Serie II results ===
Home \ Away	CFA	CFT	REȘ	SIB	CRV	ELE	GAZ	MHD	MTS	CUG	ANI	BMA	OLO	OLI	PTM	VAG
CFR Arad	—	2–0	1–1	0–2	2–0	3–2	3–1	2–0	2–2	4–0	2–1	1–0	5–1	0–0	0–0	2–2
CFR Timișoara	5–0	—	0–0	1–0	2–0	4–1	2–1	3–0	3–2	2–0	4–1	1–1	4–1	3–1	0–0	1–0
CSM Reșița	2–0	2–1	—	1–1	2–0	3–0	2–0	3–0	0–0	2–0	2–1	1–0	0–0	2–0	3–1	0–1
CSM Sibiu	2–0	2–1	2–1	—	3–1	5–1	1–0	1–0	2–1	1–0	1–0	0–0	1–0	2–0	2–2	1–1
Chimia Râmnicu Vâlcea	0–1	1–1	3–1	0–0	—	0–1	1–0	1–0	1–0	1–3	1–0	2–0	5–0	1–0	1–0	1–0
Electroputere Craiova	1–0	0–0	2–2	2–1	1–1	—	2–1	1–0	1–0	4–1	3–0	0–1	3–2	1–0	0–0	2–1
Gaz Metan Mediaș	2–1	1–0	4–1	2–1	2–1	1–2	—	1–0	2–1	1–0	0–2	3–0	3–0	0–0	4–0	0–0
Metalul Hunedoara	2–0	1–1	1–0	1–1	5–1	5–0	4–0	—	2–1	2–1	2–0	0–0	2–0	2–0	2–2	0–0
Metalul Turnu Severin	3–2	0–1	1–0	0–1	2–1	0–1	1–4	0–1	—	1–4	1–0	1–0	1–0	0–1	2–0	0–1
Metalurgistul Cugir	3–1	0–0	2–0	0–0	1–1	1–0	0–2	1–0	5–0	—	1–0	0–1	0–0	2–1	2–1	1–0
Minerul Anina	4–1	1–0	2–3	3–0	3–1	1–1	4–0	2–0	2–0	2–1	—	2–0	7–2	6–2	3–2	1–0
Minerul Baia Mare	2–0	0–0	1–0	2–0	4–0	3–0	2–1	1–0	2–0	1–0	2–0	—	0–0	1–0	1–0	3–0
Olimpia Oradea	3–1	1–1	0–0	1–1	3–1	5–0	5–2	1–0	6–0	2–0	4–1	1–0	—	1–2	4–1	1–1
Olimpia Satu Mare	0–0	2–1	1–0	0–0	0–1	2–0	2–0	2–2	4–1	1–0	3–2	1–0	2–1	—	2–1	2–0
Politehnica Timișoara	2–1	2–1	1–1	4–1	2–1	4–2	5–0	4–1	5–0	3–0	2–1	1–0	3–1	1–0	—	3–0
Vagonul Arad	0–0	0–1	0–2	1–0	1–0	1–0	1–0	3–1	4–0	0–1	1–0	0–0	4–1	0–0	2–1	—

Source: www.rsssf.com
Legend: Blue = home team win; Yellow = draw; Red = away team win.

=== Serie II positions by round ===
Team ╲ Round	1	2	3	4	5	6	7	8	9	10	11	12	13	14	15	16	17	18	19	20	21	22	23	24	25	26	27	28	29	30
CFR Arad	7	14	15	12	9	12	8	8	12	9	11	12	12	11	12	12	12	12	12	12	12	14	12	12	14	13	14	13	14	15
CFR Timișoara	12	5	8	4	11	10	12	13	10	11	9	2	1	1	1	1	1	1	1	1	1	1	1	1	1	1	1	1	1	1
CSM Reșița	8	2	7	2	4	4	9	5	2	7	5	4	7	9	7	5	5	6	7	8	7	5	5	6	5	3	5	5	4	5
CSM Sibiu	1	3	9	5	6	1	1	1	3	1	1	3	2	4	2	3	2	2	3	2	2	4	4	4	3	4	3	3	3	2
Chimia Râmnicu Vâlcea	13	12	12	16	15	16	16	16	16	16	16	16	15	15	15	16	16	16	16	16	16	15	15	15	15	15	13	14	15	13
Electroputere Craiova	16	13	6	1	2	8	13	7	4	8	7	7	8	8	10	8	9	9	8	6	8	6	6	7	7	7	9	7	8	7
Gaz Metan Mediaș	6	9	4	8	13	14	14	15	15	15	14	14	14	13	14	14	14	14	14	13	14	13	14	14	13	14	12	11	12	12
Metalul Hunedoara	9	4	2	6	1	5	10	10	13	13	13	13	13	14	13	13	13	13	13	14	13	11	11	10	9	11	11	12	10	10
Metalul Turnu Severin	15	16	13	15	16	15	15	14	14	14	15	15	16	16	16	15	15	15	15	15	15	16	16	16	16	16	16	16	16	16
Metalurgistul Cugir	14	15	16	13	14	13	11	6	11	12	10	9	10	7	9	9	11	8	11	11	10	12	13	13	11	10	8	9	11	11
Minerul Anina	3	8	3	7	8	3	2	4	9	6	8	11	9	10	8	10	8	10	9	9	9	9	10	9	10	9	7	8	7	9
Minerul Baia Mare	11	6	11	14	12	7	7	11	7	3	6	8	6	6	6	4	6	5	6	4	3	3	3	2	2	2	2	2	2	3
Olimpia Oradea	2	10	10	10	5	2	6	12	8	10	12	10	11	12	11	11	10	11	10	10	11	10	9	11	12	12	15	15	13	14
Olimpia Satu Mare	4	7	14	11	7	11	5	9	6	4	2	6	4	2	4	6	4	4	2	3	4	2	2	3	4	6	4	4	5	6
Politehnica Timișoara	5	11	5	9	3	9	4	2	5	2	4	1	5	3	5	7	7	7	5	7	5	7	7	5	6	5	6	6	6	4
Vagonul Arad	10	1	1	3	10	6	3	3	1	5	3	5	3	5	3	2	3	3	4	5	6	8	8	8	8	8	10	10	9	8

== See also ==
- 1969–70 Divizia A
- 1969–70 Divizia C
- 1969–70 County Championship
- 1969–70 Cupa României
