= Ion Ion (footballer) =

Romanian footballer and manager

Personal information
- Full name: Ion Ion
- Date of birth: 21 June 1954 (age 72)
- Place of birth: Bucharest, Romania
- Position: Midfielder

Youth career
- Centrul 23 August București
- 1971–1972: Steaua București

Senior career*
Years	Team	Apps	(Gls)
1972–1979	Steaua București	133	(14)
1979	Metalul București		
1979–1986	Rapid București (Note: The statistics for the 1979–80, 1980–81, 1981–82 and 1982–83 Divizia B seasons are unavailable.)	56	(6)
1986–1988	Carpați Mârșa	25	(3)
1988	Automatica București		
Total		214	(23)

Managerial career
- 1988–1992: Rapid București (youth)
- 1992–1996: Jiul Petroșani (assistant)
- 1996: Jiul Petroșani (caretaker)
- 1997: Jiul Petroșani
- 1997–1998: Al Shabab
- 1998–1999: Al Ain (assistant)
- 1999–2000: Al-Muharraq
- 2001–2002: Romania U18
- 2002–2003: Fujairah
- 2003–2005: Național București (technical director)
- 2005–2006: Muscat Club
- 2007–2008: ROVA Roşiori
- 2009–2011: Tunari
- 2012–2013: Al Shahaniya
- 2017–2018: Steaua București
- 2019: Sporting Roșiori
- * Club domestic league appearances and goals

Ion Ion (born 21 June 1954) is a Romanian football manager and former player.

In his coaching career he has coached several clubs from Oman, Bahrain, UAE and Qatar.

He managed Steaua București for the 2017–18 season, but his contract was not renewed after the club failed to gain promotion to Liga III.

== Honours ==
=== Player ===
Steaua București

- Divizia A: 1975–76, 1977–78
- Cupa României: 1975–76

Rapid București

- Divizia B: 1982–83

=== Manager ===
Steaua București

- Liga IV Bucharest:
  - Runner-up: 2017-18
