= CSU Dunărea de Jos Galați =

Romanian football club

CSU Galați
- Full name: Club Sportiv Universitatea "Dunărea de Jos" Galați
- Nickname(s): Studenții (The Students); Alb-albaștrii (The White-Blues); Știința (The Science)
- Short name: CSU Galați
- Founded: 1953 as Știința Galați; 1967 as Politehnica Galați; 2017 as CSU Dunărea de Jos Galați
- Dissolved: 2020
- Ground: Portul Roșu
- Capacity: 5,000
- 2019–20: Liga III, Seria I, 14th, (relegated)
- Website: http://csu-galati.ro/
Home colours	Away colours	Third colours

Club Sportiv Universitatea "Dunărea de Jos" Galați commonly known as CS Universitatea "Dunărea de Jos" Galați, or simply as CSU Galați, was a Romanian football team based in Galați, Galați County. The team was founded in 1953, re-founded in 1967 and 2017, and was finally dissolved in 2020. In 1976, CSU played in the Cupa României final but lost 0–1 against Steaua București.

== History ==
The team was founded in 1953 as a football section within the multi-sports club Știința Galați, which was founded in 1951 with the establishment of the Institute of Naval Mechanics.

Știința initially competed in the Galați Regional Championship, finishing 7th in the 1953 season and becoming the University Champion of the country in the same year. The students were promoted to Divizia C after finishing 2nd in the 1955 season.

In the third division, Știința ranked 5th in Series I in both the 1956 and 1957–58 seasons and 8th in the 1958–59 season, returning to the Galați Regional Championship after the dissolution of Divizia C in the summrer of 1959.

In the 1959–60 season, Știința won Series I of the Galați Regional Championship but lost the championship final against CSM Brăila, 2–4 on aggregate (1–1 at home and 1–3 away).

In the 1960–61 season, Știința won Series II and the championship final of the Regional Championship against Marina Brăila, the Series I winner, 5–1 on aggregate (3–1 away and 2–0 at home), qualified for the promotion play-off, and secured promotion to Divizia B after finishing 1st in Group I, held in Râmnicu Vâlcea. The squad led by I. Iovicin was composed of Bulancea, Dan, Morcovescu, Dumitru, Curt, Vlăsceanu, Lupea, Șerbănescu, Coman, Fălcuțescu, Păun, Voicu II, Zgardan, Venturini, Bădulescu, and Voicu I.

In the second division, Știința competed in Series I and finished 7th in its first season, 8th in the 1962–63 season, 12th in the 1963–64 season, and 5th in the 1964–65 season. In 1965, Știința gave up its place in Divizia B to Oțelul Galați.

In 1967, the club was refounded under the name Politehnica Galați and took over the place of Siderurgistul Galați in Divizia B. Finishing 2nd in the 1967–68 season, the team participated in the promotion play-off to Divizia A held in Timișoara, where it finished last. The squad included players such as Iorgulescu, Enache, Pac, Costache, Dima, Diaconu, Stancu, Velea, Mureșan, Lehăduș, Adam, Bretan, Cojocaru, Neagu, and Stătescu.

The students remained in the promotion race for two more seasons, finishing 2nd in the 1968–69 season and 3rd the following season. In the 1970–71 season, under Vasile Stancu and later Dragoș Cojocaru, Politehnica finished 14th, avoiding relegation on goal difference. Cojocaru led the team to 4th place in the 1971–72 season.

In 1972, the club changed its name to CSU Galați. In the 1972–73 season, it ranked last but was spared relegation due to the expansion of the second division. It finished 11th in the 1973–74 season and 10th in 1974–75.

In the 1975–76 season, CSU Galați finished 4th and achieved the best performance in its history, reaching the final of the Cupa României as a second-division team. Along the way, it eliminated CFR Cluj (1–0), Jiul Petroșani (1–0), ASA Târgu Mureș (2–0), and Universitatea Craiova (1–0), before losing 0–1 to Steaua București. The squad, led by Ion Zaharia, included Gheorghe Tănase, Andrei Pasquale, Mihai Olteanu, Iosif Marta, Daniel Șarpe, Florin Păunescu, Mihail Bejenaru, Octavian Georgescu, Valentin Kramer, Petre Marinescu, Dobre, Teodor Cotigă, and Ene.

Because Steaua also won the Divizia A title that year, CSU Galați represented Romania in the 1976–77 European Cup Winners' Cup, where it was eliminated by Portuguese side Boavista Porto.

In the 1976–77 season, led by Ion Zaharia in the first half and Dumitru Comșa in the second, the students finished 7th in Series I and reached the Round of 16 in the Cupa României, where they lost to top-tier SC Bacău, 1–1 and 2–3 on penalties. In the 1977–78 season, under Cornel Simionescu, the team finished 16th and was relegated to Divizia C. Competing in Series III, CSU Galați finished 2nd in 1978–79 and returned to Divizia B at the end of the 1979–80 season, after winning the series under coach Ion Zaharia.

In Divizia B, the team finished 11th in the 1980–81 season and 15th in 1981–82, relegating once again. In 1982, CSU Galați merged with FCM Galați to form Dunărea CSU Galați.

In the summer of 2017, CSU Galați was refounded, and after two seasons in Liga IV – Galați County, it was promoted to Liga III. In 2020, during the winter break, CSU Galați withdrew from Liga III and was dissolved again.

== Honours ==
=== Leagues ===
Liga II

- Runners-up (2): 1967–68, 1968–69

Liga III

- Winners (1): 1979–80
- Runners-up (1): 1978–79

Liga IV – Galați County

- Winners (2): 2017–18, 2018–19

Galați Regional Championship

- Winners (1): 1960–61
- Runners-up (1): 1955

=== Cups ===
Cupa României

- Runners-up (1): 1975–76

Cupa României – Galați County

- Winners (2): 2017–18, 2018–19

== European record ==
European Cup Winners' Cup

Season	Round	Club	Home	Away	Aggregate
1976–77	First round	(Portugal) Boavista	2–3	0–2	2–5

- UEFA Cup Winners' Cup
  - First round (1) : 1976–77

== Former managers ==
- (Romania) Ion Zaharia (1964–1965)
- (Romania) Ion Zaharia (1966–1967)
- (Romania) Petre Rădulescu (1967–1970)
- (Romania) Vasile Stancu (1970–1971)
- (Romania) Dragoș Cojocaru (1971–1972)
- (Romania) Ion Zaharia (1972–1977)

== League history ==
Season	Tier	Division	Place	Notes	Cupa României
2019–20	3	Liga III (Seria I)	14th	Relegated	
2018–19	4	Liga IV (GL)	1st (C)	Promoted	
2017–18	4	Liga IV (GL)	1st (C)		
1982–17	Not active				
1981–82	2	Divizia B (Seria I)	15th	Relegated	
1980–81	2	Divizia B (Seria I)	11th		
1979–80	3	Divizia C (Seria III)	1st (C)	Promoted	
1978–79	3	Divizia C (Seria III)	2nd		
1977–78	2	Divizia B (Seria I)	16th	Relegated	
1976–77	2	Divizia B (Seria I)	7th		Round of 16
1975–76	2	Divizia B (Seria I)	4th		Final
1974–75	2	Divizia B (Seria I)	10th		

Season	Tier	Division	Place	Notes	Cupa României
1973–74	2	Divizia B (Seria I)	11th		
1972–73	2	Divizia B (Seria I)	16th		
1971–72	2	Divizia B (Seria I)	4th		
1970–71	2	Divizia B (Seria I)	14th		
1969–70	2	Divizia B (Seria I)	3rd		
1968–69	2	Divizia B (Seria I)	2nd		Round of 16
1967–68	2	Divizia B (Seria I)	2nd		
1965–67	Not active				
1964–65	2	Divizia B (Seria I)	5th	Disbanded	Round of 32
1963–64	2	Divizia B (Seria I)	12th		Round of 32
1962–63	2	Divizia B (Seria I)	8th		Round of 32
1961–62	2	Divizia B (Seria I)	9th		
