= 1976–77 Cupa României =

Tournament details
- Country: Romania

Final positions
- Champions: Universitatea Craiova
- Runners-up: Steaua București

The 1976–77 Cupa României was the 39th edition of Romania's most prestigious football cup competition.

The title was won by Universitatea Craiova against Steaua București.

== Format ==
The competition is an annual knockout tournament.

First round proper matches are played on the ground of the lowest ranked team, then from the second round proper the matches are played on a neutral location.

If a match is drawn after 90 minutes, the game goes in extra time, and if the scored is still tight after 120 minutes, then the winner will be established at penalty kicks.

From the first edition, the teams from Divizia A entered in competition in sixteen finals, rule which remained till today.

== First round proper ==
| Team 1 | Score | Team 2 |
|---|---|---|
1 December 1976
| CS Botoşani (Div. C) | 1–1 (a.e.t.)(3–2 p) | (Div. B) Petrolul Ploiești |
8 December 1976
| Constructorul Alba Iulia (Div. C) | 0–2 (a.e.t.) | (Div. A) Bihor Oradea |
| ICIM Braşov (Div. C) | 1–0 | (Div. B) Olimpia Satu Mare |
| Automecanica București (Div. C) | 1–0 | (Div. A) Politehnica Iaşi |
| Dinamo București (Div. A) | 1–4 | (Div. A) Steaua București |
| Rapid București (Div. A) | 2–1 | (Div. A) FC Constanţa |
| Sportul Studenţesc București (Div. A) | 0–0 (a.e.t.)(3–4 p) | (Div. A) UTA Arad |
| Universitatea Craiova (Div. A) | 1–0 | (Div. A) Corvinul Hunedoara |
| CSU Galaţi (Div. B) | 1–1 (a.e.t.)(4–2 p) | (Div. A) FCM Galaţi |
| Rapid Jibou (Div. D) | 0–1 | (Div. C) Progresul Corabia |
| AS Miercurea Ciuc (Div. D) | 0–1 (a.e.t.) | (Div. B) Metalul București |
| Minerul Motru (Div. C) | 2–1 | (Div. A) Politehnica Timişoara |
| Dierna Orşova (Div. C) | 0–5 | (Div. A) SC Bacău |
| Arges Pitești (Div. A) | 3–2 | (Div. A) Progresul București |
| FCM Reșița (Div. A) | 3–2 | (Div. A) ASA 1962 Târgu Mureș |
| Cetatea Târgu Neamț (Div. C) | 0–3 | (Div. A) Jiul Petroşani |

== Second round proper ==
| Team 1 | Score | Team 2 |
|---|---|---|
27 February 1977
| Universitatea Craiova | 3–0 | Jiul Petroşani |
| Rapid București | 2–1 | ICIM Braşov |
| UTA Arad | 3–1 | Bihor Oradea |
| SC Bacău | 1–1 (a.e.t.)(3–2 p) | CSU Galaţi |
| Steaua București | 6–0 | Minerul Motru |
| Metalul București | 1–0 | Argeş Piteşti |
| FCM Reșița | 2–0 (a.e.t.) | CS Botoşani |
| Automecanica București | 1–1 (a.e.t.)(3–1 p) | Progresul Corabia |

== Quarter-finals ==
| Team 1 | Score | Team 2 |
|---|---|---|
1 June 1977
| Steaua București | 3–2 (a.e.t.) | SC Bacău |
| Rapid București | 6–1 | Automecanica București |
| Metalul București | 1–0 | FCM Reșița |
| Universitatea Craiova | 5–0 | UTA Arad |

== Semi-finals ==
| Team 1 | Score | Team 2 |
|---|---|---|
15 June 1977
| Steaua București | 4–2 | Metalul București |
| Universitatea Craiova | 1–0 | Rapid București |

== Final ==
3 July 1977
17:15 EET

| Universitatea Craiova | 2–1 | Steaua București |
|---|---|---|
| Balaci 50'; Cârțu 64' | Report | Marin 78' |

Republicii, Bucharest
Attendance: 30,000
Referee: Ioan Igna (Timișoara)

Cupa României 1976–77 winners

1st title
