= 1975–76 Cupa României =

Tournament details
- Country: Romania

Final positions
- Champions: Steaua București
- Runners-up: CSU Galaţi

The 1975–76 Cupa României was the 38th edition of Romania's most prestigious football cup competition.

The title was won by Steaua București against CSU Galaţi.

== Format ==
The competition is an annual knockout tournament.

First round proper matches are played on the ground of the lowest ranked team, then from the second round proper the matches are played on a neutral location.

If a match is drawn after 90 minutes, the game goes in extra time, and if the scored is still tight after 120 minutes, then the winner will be established at penalty kicks.

From the first edition, the teams from Divizia A entered in competition in sixteen finals, rule which remained till today.

== First round proper ==
Team 1	Score	Team 2
28 February 1976
FIL Orăştie (Div. D)	0–0 (a.e.t.)(4–3 p)	(Div. C) Metalul Turnu Severin
29 February 1976
Letea Bacău (Div. C)	3–1	(Div. B) Tractorul Brașov
SC Bacău (Div. A)	1–2	(Div. A) UTA Arad
Progresul București (Div. B)	0–0 (a.e.t.)(4–2 p)	(Div. A) FCM Reșița
Rapid București (Div. A)	0–0 (a.e.t.)(5–3 p)	(Div. A) Politehnica Iaşi
Gloria Buzău (Div. B)	1–1 (a.e.t.)(4–5 p)	(Div. A) Bihor Oradea
ASA Câmpulung Moldovenesc (Div. C)	1–2 (a.e.t.)	(Div. A) Universitatea Cluj
CSU Galaţi (Div. B)	1–0	(Div. A) CFR Cluj
Energia Oneşti (Div. C)	0–2	(Div. A) Argeş Piteşti
Dierna Orşova (Div. C)	1–2	(Div. B) FC Baia Mare
Dacia Piteşti (Div. D)	0–4	(Div. A) Jiul Petroşani
Olimpia Satu Mare (Div. A)	1–4	(Div. A) Steaua București
Șoimii Sibiu (Div. B)	1–3	(Div. A) Universitatea Craiova
Politehnica Timişoara (Div. A)	1–0	(Div. A) FC Constanţa
ASA 1962 Târgu Mureș (Div. A)	4–2	(Div. A) Dinamo București
23 March 1976
Minerul Turţ (Div. D)	1–8	(Div. A) Sportul Studenţesc București

== Second round proper ==
Team 1	Score	Team 2
16 June 1976
Rapid București	1–0 (a.e.t.)	Progresul București
CSU Galaţi	1–0	Jiul Petroşani
Sportul Studenţesc București	3–1	Politehnica Timişoara
Steaua București	8–1	FIL Orăştie
Argeş Piteşti	4–3 (a.e.t.)	FC Baia Mare
ASA 1962 Târgu Mureș	0–0 (a.e.t.)(3–0 p)	Universitatea Cluj
Universitatea Craiova	3–2 (a.e.t.)	UTA Arad
Bihor Oradea	3–0	Letea Bacău

== Quarter-finals ==
Team 1	Score	Team 2
23 June 1976
Steaua București	2–0	Rapid București
Universitatea Craiova	2–1	Sportul Studenţesc București
CSU Galaţi	2–0	ASA 1962 Târgu Mureș
Bihor Oradea	1–0	Argeş Piteşti

== Semi-finals ==
Team 1	Score	Team 2
27 June 1976
CSU Galaţi	1–0	Universitatea Craiova
Steaua București	4–2	Bihor Oradea

== Final ==
30 June 1976
19:00 EET

Steaua București	1–0	CSU Galaţi
Iordănescu 75'	Report

23 August, Bucharest
Attendance: 50,000
Referee: Nicolae Petriceanu (Bucharest)
