= 1976–77 FC Dinamo București season =

FC Dinamo București
1976–77 season
- Manager: Ion Nunweiller
- Divizia A: 1st
- Romanian Cup: Last 32
- UEFA Cup: First round
- Top goalscorer: Dudu Georgescu (47 goals)

The 1976–77 season was FC Dinamo București's 28th season in Divizia A. Dinamo dominated the championship, leading for 27 out of the 34 rounds. Dudu Georgescu won the European Golden Boot for the second time, with a record number of goals – 47, scoring 56% of the team's goals. In the UEFA Cup, Dinamo played against another "sacred monster" – AC Milan – with Fabio Capello and Collovatti on its side: 0–0 and 1–2.

== Results ==
Divizia A
Round	Date	Opponent	Stadium	Result
1	22 August 1976	Poli Timișoara	A	1-3
2	29 August 1976	UTA	H	7-0
3	1 September 1976	Steaua București	H	5-2
4	5 September 1976	FCM Galați	A	2-0
5	11 September 1976	FC Constanța	H	4-0
6	19 September 1976	Rapid București	H	3-1
7	25 September 1976	Corvinul Hunedoara	A	2-0
8	10 October 1976	FC Argeş	H	4-1
9	16 October 1976	Sportul Studențesc	A	1-1
10	24 October 1976	ASA Târgu Mureș	A	0-0
11	31 October 1976	SC Bacău	H	2-1
12	7 November 1976	FC Bihor	A	0-3
13	14 November 1976	U Craiova	H	2-1
14	20 November 1976	Poli Iași	A	0-0
15	1 December 1976	Progresul București	A	1-2
16	5 December 1976	Jiul Petroșani	H	3-1
17	12 December 1976	FCM Reșița	A	1-1
18	1 June 1977	Poli Timișoara	H	2-0
19	19 March 1977	UTA	A	3-3
20	27 March 1977	Steaua București	A	2-2
21	2 April 1977	FCM Galați	H	4-0
22	24 April 1977	FC Constanța	A	1-2
23	1 May 1977	Rapid București	A	0-1
24	12 May 1977	Corvinul Hunedoara	H	2-0
25	15 May 1977	FC Argeş	A	2-2
26	22 May 1977	Sportul Studențesc	H	7-1
27	25 May 1977	ASA Târgu Mureș	H	5-1
28	29 May 1977	SC Bacău	A	1-0
29	5 June 1977	FC Bihor	H	4-1
30	8 June 1977	U Craiova	A	1-1
31	12 June 1977	Poli Iași	H	1-0
32	19 June 1977	Progresul București	H	4-1
33	26 June 1977	Jiul Petroșani	A	2-2
34	30 June 1977	FCM Reșița	H	5-0

Divizia A 1976–77 Winners
Dinamo București
9th Title

Cupa României
Round	Date	Opponent	Stadium	Result
Last 32	8 December 1976	Steaua București	București	1-4

== UEFA Cup ==
First round

15 September 1976

FC Dinamo București	0 – 0	AC Milan

Stadionul Dinamo, Bucharest
Attendance: 20,000
Referee: Klaus Ohmsen (West Germany)

30 September 1976
20:30

AC Milan	2 – 1	FC Dinamo București
Calloni 26'; Silva 74'		Sătmăreanu 9'

Stadio San Siro, Milan
Attendance: 60,000
Referee: John Wright Paterson (Scotland)

AC Milan won 2-1 on aggregate

== Squad ==
Goalkeepers: Constantin Ștefan (31 / 0); Constantin Eftimescu (3 / 0).
Defenders: Florin Cheran (34 / 3); Gabriel Sandu (29 / 1); Vasile Dobrău (26 / 3); Teodor Lucuță (19 / 0); Alexandru Sătmăreanu (34 / 5); Ladislau Ghiță (11 / 0); Marin Ion (21 / 1).
Midfielders: Alexandru Moldovan (30 / 3); Cornel Dinu (31 / 6).
Forwards: Alexandru Custov (33 / 2); Dudu Georgescu (31 / 47); Ion Moldovan (25 / 2); Cristian Vrînceanu (25 / 0); Adalbert Rozsnyai (20 / 3); Mircea Lucescu (19 / 7); Vasile Chitaru (7 / 0); Sorin Georgescu (1 / 0).
(league appearances and goals listed in brackets)

Manager: Ion Nunweiller.
