= 1977–78 FC Dinamo București season =

FC Dinamo București
1977–78 season
- Manager: Ion Nunweiller
- Divizia A: 5th
- Romanian Cup: Quarter finals
- European Cup: First round
- Top goalscorer: Dudu Georgescu (24 goals)

The 1977–78 season was FC Dinamo București's 29th season in Divizia A. Dinamo lost Radu Nunweiller and Mircea Lucescu who both went to Corvinul Hunedoara. Because of these losses, Dinamo could not fight for the championship, and finished only fifth. In the European Cup, Dinamo wins a thrilling game against Atlético Madrid 2–1, but loses in Madrid, 2–0.

== Results ==
Divizia A
Round	Date	Opponent	Stadium	Result
1	21 August 1977	SC Bacău	H	0–0
2	24 August 1977	Poli Iași	A	1–2
3	28 August 1977	Sportul Studențesc	H	0–1
4	4 September 1977	U Craiova	H	2–0
5	10 September 1977	Corvinul Hunedoara	A	1–1
6	18 September 1977	UTA	H	3–1
7	24 September 1977	Jiul Petroșani	A	1–4
8	2 October 1977	CS Târgoviște	H	3–0
9	12 October 1977	FC Constanța	A	4–2
10	30 October 1977	Petrolul Ploiești	H	2–1
11	5 November 1977	FC Bihor	A	1–2
12	16 November 1977	FCM Reșița	H	1–0
13	20 November 1977	FC Argeş	A	0–1
14	23 November 1977	Olimpia Satu Mare	H	3–2
15	27 November 1977	Steaua București	A	3–3
16	30 November 1977	Poli Timișoara	A	0–1
17	4 December 1977	ASA Târgu Mureș	H	1–1
18	26 February 1978	SC Bacău	A	0–1
19	5 March 1978	Poli Iași	H	1–0
20	8 March 1978	Sportul Studențesc	A	2–0
21	12 March 1978	U Craiova	A	2–3
22	16 March 1978	Corvinul Hunedoara	H	3–1
23	26 March 1978	UTA	A	0–1
24	12 April 1978	Jiul Petroșani	H	2–1
25	16 April 1978	CS Târgoviște	A	0–2
26	23 April 1978	FC Constanța	H	1–2
27	27 April 1978	Petrolul Ploiești	A	2–3
28	7 May 1978	FC Bihor	H	2–0
29	18 May 1978	FCM Reșița	A	3–0
30	21 May 1978	FC Argeş	H	1–0
31	28 May 1978	Olimpia Satu Mare	A	0–0
32	4 June 1978	Steaua București	H	0–1
33	11 June 1978	Poli Timișoara	H	4–2
34	15 June 1978	ASA Târgu Mureș	A	1–1

Cupa României
Round	Date	Opponent	Stadium	Result
Last 32	19 February 1978	Victoria Zalău	A	7–0
Last 16	19 April 1978	FC Constanța	Brăila	1–0
Quarter finals	24 May 1978	U Craiova	Sibiu	2–3

== European Cup ==
First round

14 September 1977
17:45

FC Dinamo București	2–1	Atlético Madrid
Vrînceanu 14'; Georgescu 73'		Pereira 58'

Stadionul Dinamo, Bucharest
Attendance: 45,000
Referee: Ok Hilmi (Turkey)

28 September 1977
20:30

Atlético Madrid	2–0	FC Dinamo București
Benegas 67'; Rubén Cano 81'

Vicente Calderón Stadium, Madrid
Attendance: 60,000
Referee: Klaus Ohmsen (West Germany)

Atlético Madrid won 3-2 on aggregate

== Squad ==
Goalkeepers: Constantin Eftimescu, Constantin Traian Ștefan.

Defenders: Florin Cheran, Vasile Dobrău, Teodor Lucuță, Gabriel Sandu, Alexandru Sătmăreanu.

Midfielders: Alexandru Custov, Cornel Dinu, Ion Marin, Ion Mateescu, Ion Moldovan.

Forwards: Ionel Augustin, Vasile Chitaru, Dudu Georgescu, Sorin Georgescu, Alexandru Moldovan, Adalbert Rozsnyai, Cornel Țălnar, Cristian Vrînceanu.
