= 1974–75 FC Dinamo București season =

FC Dinamo București
1974–75 season
- Manager: Dumitru Nicolae Nicuşor
- Divizia A: 1st
- Romanian Cup: Last 32
- UEFA Cup: Second round
- Top goalscorer: Dudu Georgescu (33 goals)

The 1974-75 season was FC Dinamo București's 26th season in Divizia A. Dinamo dominated the national championship, winning the first six matches and leading from start to finish. Instead, they left the Romanian Cup yet again in the last 32. In Europe, Dinamo played in the UEFA Cup and after the eliminating Boluspor, failed in the confrontation with F.C. Koln: 1-1 and 2-3!

Dudu Georgescu became the championship's top scorer, with 33 goals, and also won the European Golden Boot, being the first Romanian football player winner of a European prize.

== Results ==
Divizia A
Round	Date	Opponent	Stadium	Result
1	11 August 1974	CSM Reșița	H	2-1
2	17 August 1974	CFR Cluj	A	2-0
3	25 August 1974	Steaua București	H	2-0
4	28 August 1974	ASA Târgu Mureș	H	5-1
5	1 September 1974	UTA	A	1-0
6	8 September 1974	FC Argeş	H	3-2
7	14 September 1974	Sportul Studențesc	A	0-1
8	28 September 1974	Chimia Râmnicu Vâlcea	A	2-0
9	19 October 1974	FCM Galați	H	2-0
10	27 October 1974	FC Constanța	A	1-1
11	1 November 1974	Jiul Petroșani	H	3-1
12	10 November 1974	Olimpia Satu Mare	A	0-1
13	17 November 1974	U Craiova	H	1-0
14	20 November 1974	Poli Timișoara	A	1-2
15	24 November 1974	U Cluj	H	2-0
16	30 November 1974	Poli Iaşi	A	4-3
17	8 December 1974	Steagul Roșu Brașov	H	1-0
18	2 March 1975	CSM Reșița	A	2-2
19	8 March 1975	CFR Cluj	H	1-0
20	15 March 1975	Steaua București	A	3-1
21	23 March 1975	ASA Târgu Mureș	A	0-2
22	26 March 1975	UTA	H	2-0
23	5 April 1975	FC Argeş	A	2-2
24	9 April 1975	Sportul Studențesc	H	3-0
25	23 April 1975	Chimia Râmnicu Vâlcea	H	5-0
26	27 April 1975	FCM Galați	A	1-2
27	4 May 1975	FC Constanța	H	3-3
28	14 May 1975	Jiul Petroșani	A	0-2
29	18 May 1975	Olimpia Satu Mare	H	5-0
30	25 May 1975	U Craiova	A	0-3
31	8 June 1975	Poli Timișoara	H	2-2
32	11 June 1975	U Cluj	A	0-1
33	23 June 1975	Poli Iaşi	H	1-2
34	29 June 1975	Steagul Roșu Brașov	A	1-2

Divizia A 1974–75 Winners
Dinamo București
8th Title

Cupa României
Round	Date	Opponent	Stadium	Result
Last 32	13 November 1974	Rapid București	București	1-2

== UEFA Cup ==
First round

18 September 1974
15:30

Boluspor	0 – 1	FC Dinamo București
		R.Nunweiller 36'

Seheir, Bolu
Attendance: 2,116
Referee: Giulio Ciacci (Italy)

2 October 1974
15:00

FC Dinamo București	3 – 0	Boluspor
Dinu 36'; Dumitrache 58'; Lucescu 85'

Stadionul Dinamo, Bucharest
Attendance: 18,000
Referee: Marian Kuston (Poland)

Dinamo București won 4-0 on aggregate

Second round

23 October 1974
15:00

FC Dinamo București	1 – 1	F.C. Köln
Dinu 65'		Lauscher 41'

Stadionul Dinamo, Bucharest
Attendance: 30,000
Referee: Michael Kitabdjian (France)

5 November 1974

F.C. Köln	3 – 2	FC Dinamo București
Overath 17'; Neumann 58'; Müller 73'		Custov 4'; Georgescu 8'

RheinEnergieStadion, Köln
Attendance: 14,246
Referee: Zdenek Jelinek (Czechoslovakia)

FC Köln won 4-3 on aggregate

== Squad ==
Goalkeepers: Mircea Constantinescu (32 / 0); Constantin Ștefan (1 / 0); Iosif Cavai (2 / 0).
Defenders: Florin Cheran (31 / 0); Vasile Dobrău (32 / 0); Alexandru Sătmăreanu (29 / 3); Augustin Deleanu (33 / 0); Gabriel Sandu (25 / 2); Teodor Lucuță (3 / 0).
Midfielders: Cornel Dinu (30 / 3); Radu Nunweiller (29 / 2); Viorel Sălceanu (5 / 1); Marin Ion (6 / 0); George Marincel (1 / 0); Marian Vlad (1 / 0).
Forwards: Alexandru Custov (31 / 2); Alexandru Moldovan (11 / 0); Dudu Georgescu (31 / 33); Florea Dumitrache (10 / 4); Toma Zamfir (31 / 8); Mircea Lucescu (31 / 4); Cristian Vrînceanu (8 / 0); Ionel Augustin (5 / 0).
(league appearances and goals listed in brackets)

Manager: Nicolae Dumitru.

== Transfers ==
Constantin Traian Ștefan is transferred from U Cluj at the beginning of the season. George Marincel is transferred from Viitorul Scornicești at the mid-season. Florian Dumitrescu is transferred to Steaua and Viorel Sălceanu to FC Galați.

Marin Ion and Ionel Augustin are promoted from the youth team.
