= List of FC Dinamo București players =

Dinamo București is a Romanian professional association football club based in Bucharest, who currently plays in the Liga I. The club's first team has competed in the first tier of Romanian football almost its entire existence (with the exception of the 2022–23 season played in Liga II). Since their first match in 1948, many players have made a competitive first-team appearance for the club.

The following players have made at least 100 appearances (including substitute appearances) for Dinamo in the Romanian leagues.

Dinamo's record appearance-maker is Cornel Dinu, who made 454 appearances between 1966 and 1983. Ionel Dănciulescu has made the second most appearances with 355.

== Notable players ==
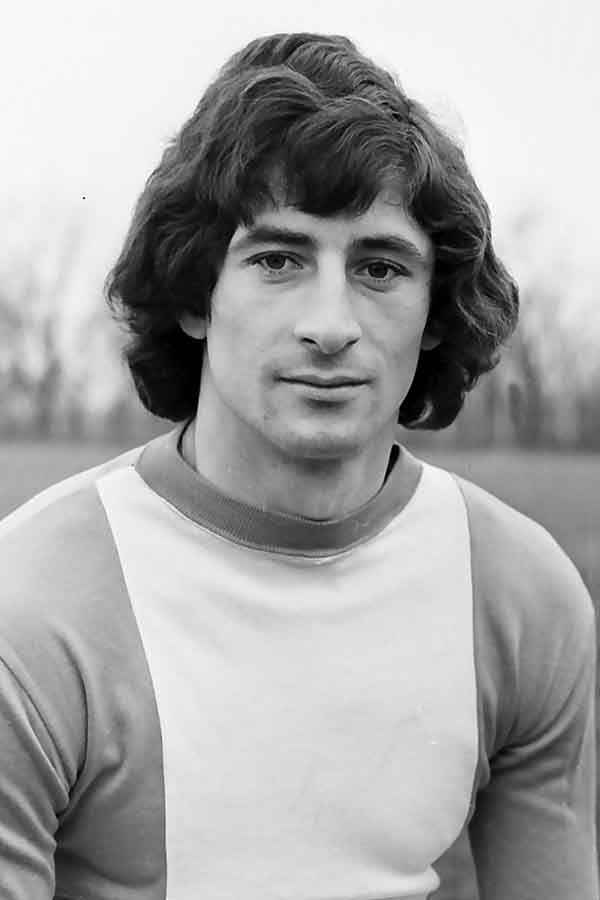
Cornel Dinu, who won the Romanian Footballer of the Year award three times, spent almost his entire career at Dinamo.

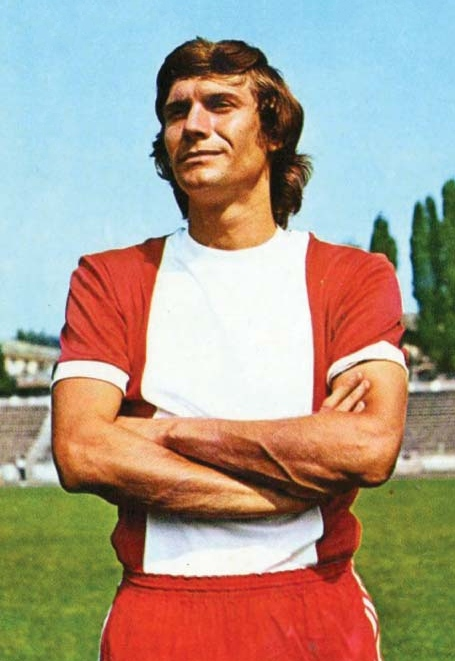
Dudu Georgescu won the European Golden Shoe award twice while playing for Dinamo.

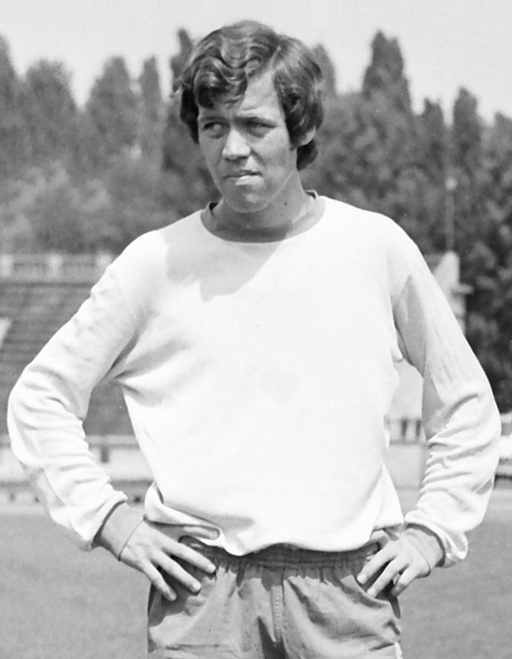
Florea Dumitrache, two-time Romanian Footballer of the Year, scored over 100 goals and won three Liga I titles during his time at Dinamo.

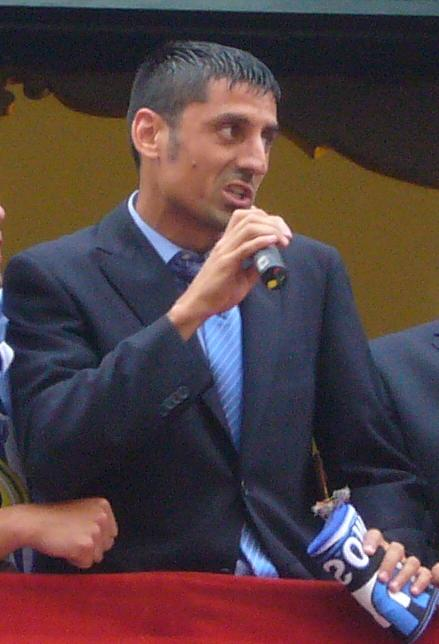
While playing for Dinamo, Ionel Dănciulescu won three Liga I titles and was named Romanian Footballer of the Year in 2004 .

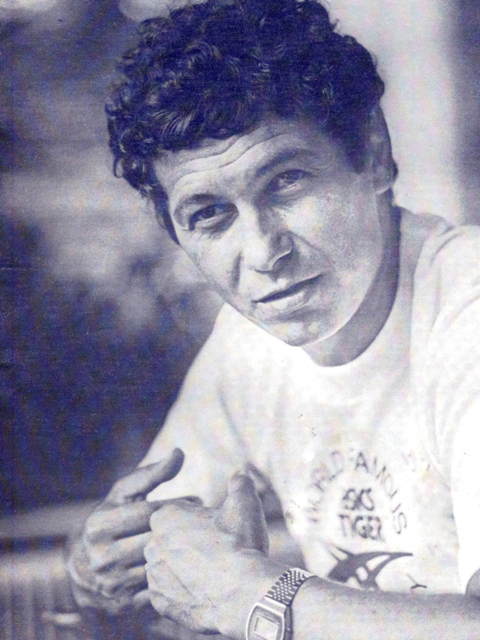
Mircea Lucescu won seven Liga I titles with the club.

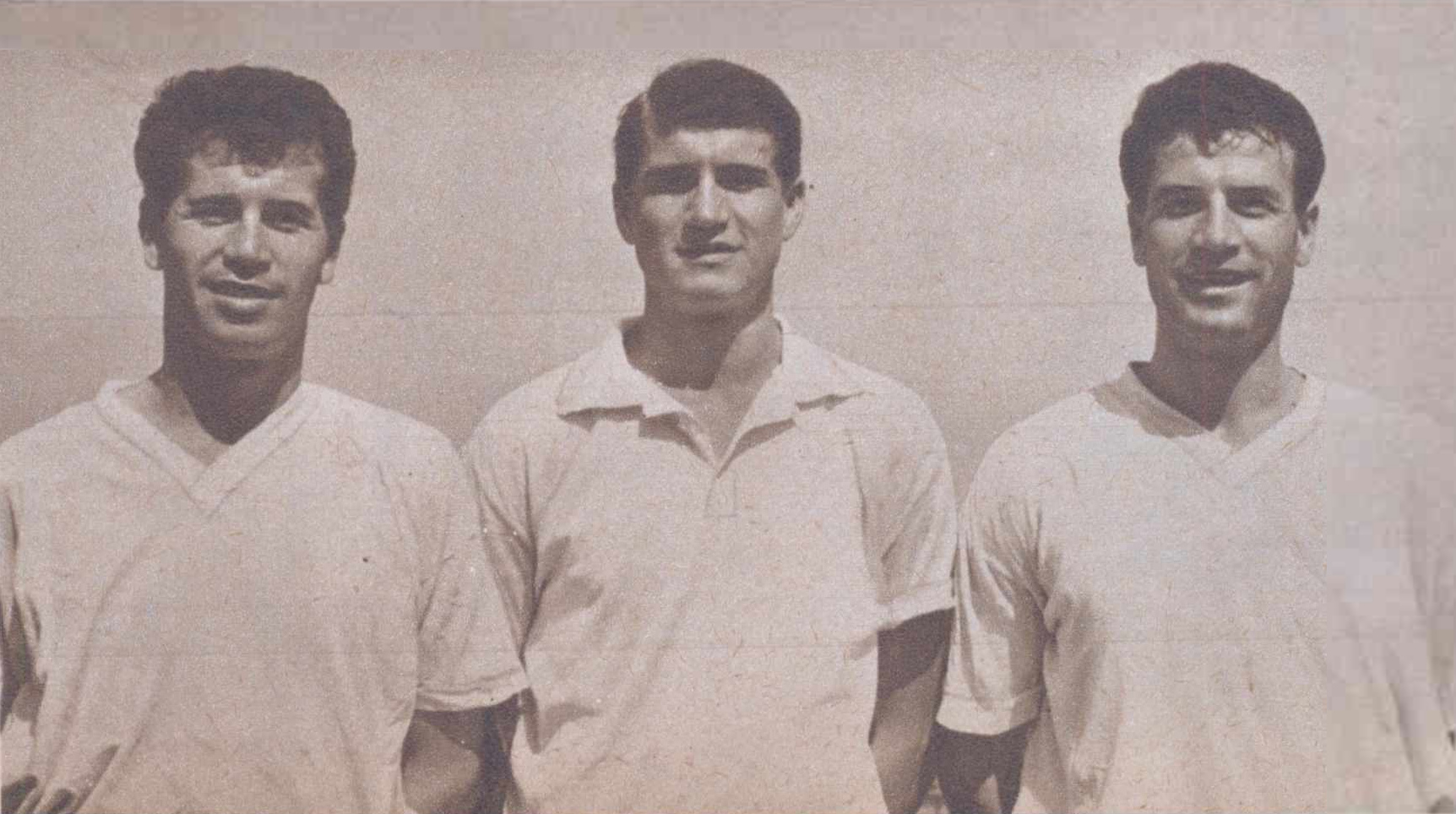
The Nunweiller brothers (left to right): Lică, Radu and Ion are the reason why the club's nickname is "The Red Dogs".

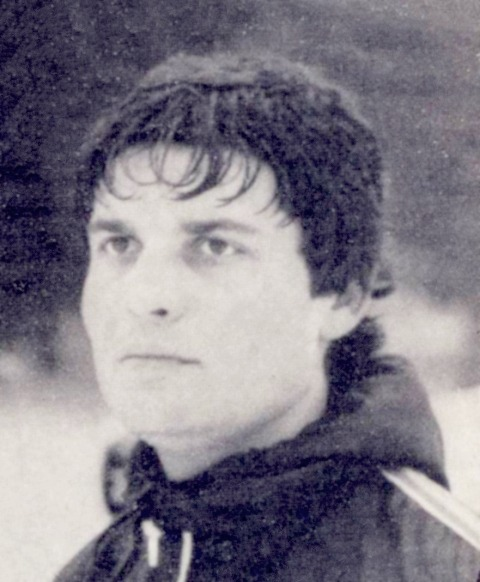
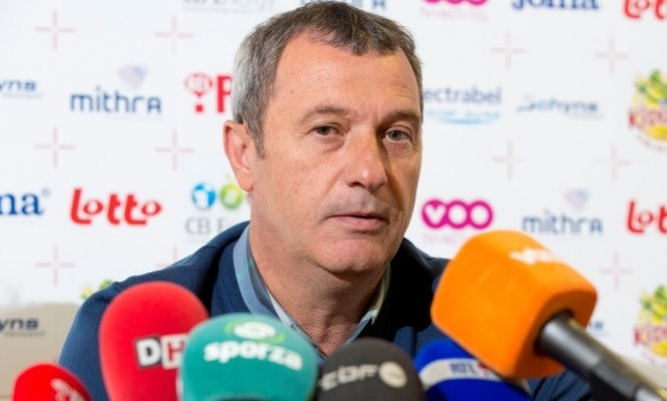
From 1983 to 1990 Ioan Andone (left) and Mircea Rednic (right) formed a partnership in Dinamo's central defense.

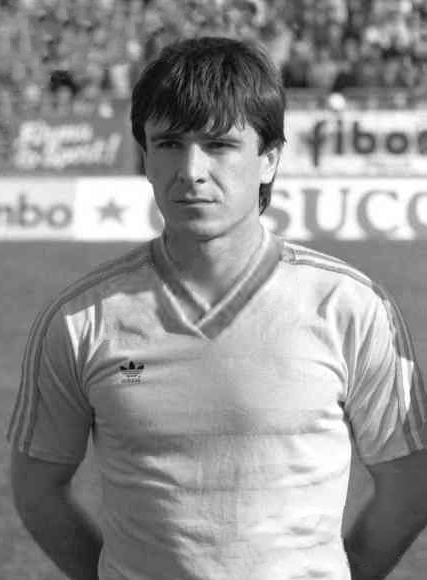
Dorin Mateuț won the European Golden Shoe award in the 1988–89 season.

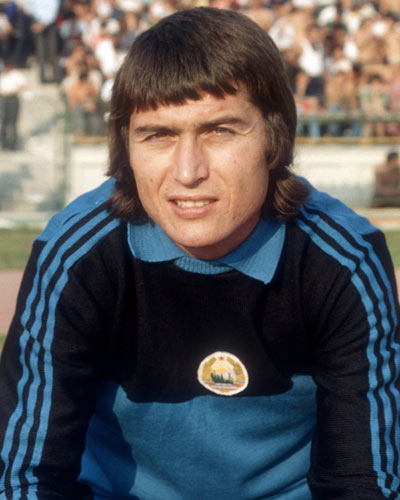
Goalkeeper Dumitru Moraru won three Liga I titles and three Romanian Cups while playing for Dinamo.

Dinamo București players with at least 100 league appearances (as of 11 January 2025)
Name	Nationality	Position	Dinamo career	Appearances	Goals	Ref
Carol Bartha	Romania	FW	1948–1955	119	35	
Gheorghe Băcuț	Romania	DF	1950–1956	144	1	
Dumitru Nicolae	Romania	FW	1950–1959	168	45	
Valeriu Călinoiu	Romania	MF	1951–1960	164	9	
Alexandru Ene	Romania	FW	1951–1960	152	92	
Ion Suru	Romania	MF	1951–1959	143	36	
Ladislau Băcuț	Romania	DF	1952–1956	107	1	
Ion Nunweiller	Romania	DF	1956–1967; 1970–1972	279	19	
Iuliu Uțu	Romania	GK	1956–1966	124	0	
Vasile Alexandru	Romania	MF	1957–1962	107	9	
Cornel Popa	Romania	DF	1957–1969	246	0	
Iosif Varga	Romania	FW	1958–1964; 1965–1969	117	29	
Lică Nunweiller	Romania	MF	1959–1967; 1970	151	5	
Gheorghe Ene	Romania	FW	1960–1967	133	75	
Constantin Frățilă	Romania	FW	1960–1970	168	74	
Dumitru Ivan	Romania	DF	1960–1967	121	1	
Mircea Stoenescu	Romania	DF	1960–1961; 1965–1973	122	2	
Ilie Datcu	Romania	GK	1961–1969	166	0	
Ion Pârcălab	Romania	FW	1961–1970	194	53	
Constantin Ștefan	Romania	DF	1962–1971	189	0	
Vasile Gergely	Romania	MF	1963–1970	136	5	
Ion Haidu	Romania	FW	1963–1972	152	37	
Mircea Lucescu	Romania	MF	1963–1977; 1989	251	57	
Radu Nunweiller	Romania	MF	1963–1976	295	38	
Florea Dumitrache	Romania	FW	1965–1976	198	108	
Cornel Dinu	Romania	DF	1966–1983	454	53	
Viorel Sălceanu	Romania	MF	1968–1974	151	24	
Florin Cheran	Romania	DF	1969–1980; 1985–1986	285	8	
Augustin Deleanu	Romania	DF	1969–1976	178	7	
Vasile Dobrău	Romania	DF	1969–1978	181	4	
Mircea Constantinescu	Romania	GK	1970–1976	110	0	
Alexandru Moldovan	Romania	MF	1970–1978	125	8	
Gabriel Sandu	Romania	DF	1971–1982	192	4	
Alexandru Sătmăreanu	Romania	DF	1971–1980	193	17	
Teodor Lucuță	Romania	DF	1972–1980	128	1	
Alexandru Custov	Romania	MF	1973–1984	319	29	
Dudu Georgescu	Romania	FW	1973–1983	260	207	
Marin Ion	Romania	DF	1973–1985	249	5	
Cristian Vrînceanu	Romania	FW	1973–1981	148	11	
Ionel Augustin	Romania	FW	1974–1985	267	87	
Constantin Traian Ștefan	Romania	GK	1974–1980	101	0	
Marin Dragnea	Romania	MF	1977–1986	251	58	
Cornel Țălnar	Romania	MF	1977–1985	230	24	
Gheorghe Mulțescu	Romania	MF	1979–1985	132	29	
Nelu Stănescu	Romania	DF	1979–1987	163	4	
Dumitru Moraru	Romania	GK	1981–1989	212	0	
Costel Orac	Romania	FW	1981–1989	217	41	
Alexandru Nicolae	Romania	DF	1982–1989	168	10	
Ioan Andone	Romania	DF	1983–1990	171	22	
Lică Movilă	Romania	MF	1983–1988	138	17	
Mircea Rednic	Romania	DF	1983–1990	212	21	
Iulian Mihăescu	Romania	DF	1985; 1986–1992	178	39	
Florin Prunea	Romania	GK	1985–1988; 1992–1998; 2000–2002	186	0	
Ioan Varga	Romania	MF	1985–1989	120	15	
Ioan Lupescu	Romania	MF	1986–1990; 1998–2000; 2000–2001; 2001–2002	183	25	
Dorin Mateuț	Romania	MF	1986–1990; 1994–1995	146	88	
Bogdan Stelea	Romania	GK	1986–1991; 2004–2005	111	0	
Dănuț Lupu	Romania	MF	1987–1990; 1995–1997; 2000–2001	136	25	
Marius Cheregi	Romania	MF	1990–1993; 1995–1996	103	10	
Costel Pană	Romania	MF	1990–1995	128	22	
Sulejman Demollari	Albania	MF	1991–1995	100	36	
Zoltán Kádár	Romania	DF	1991–1995	135	16	
Gheorghe Mihali	Romania	DF	1991–1995; 1998–2001	174	16	
Sebastian Moga	Romania	MF	1991–1997	128	11	
Leontin Grozavu	Romania	DF	1992–1998	105	5	
Cătălin Hîldan	Romania	MF	1994–2000	138	6	
Florentin Petre	Romania	MF	1994–2006	259	43	
Ionel Dănciulescu	Romania	FW	1995–1997; 2000–2009; 2010–2013	355	152	
Florin Bătrânu	Romania	DF	1996–1999	106	20	
Cosmin Contra	Romania	DF	1996–1999	101	8	
Adrian Mihalcea	Romania	FW	1996–2001; 2004–2005	181	68	
Marius Niculae	Romania	FW	1996–2001; 2008–2012; 2015	202	85	
Iosif Tâlvan	Romania	FW	1996–1998; 2000; 2001–2002	113	4	
Daniel Florea	Romania	DF	1997–2001; 2005–2006	103	3	
Giani Kiriță	Romania	DF	1997–2003	151	9	
Iulian Tameș	Romania	MF	1997–2004; 2006; 2012	138	11	
Ianis Zicu	Romania	FW	2000–2004; 2005–2006; 2007–2010	112	26	
Claudiu Niculescu	Romania	FW	2001–2002; 2003–2008; 2009–2010	191	98	
Ștefan Grigorie	Romania	MF	2002–2006	101	30	
Cristian Pulhac	Romania	DF	2002–2013	166	3	
Adrian Cristea	Romania	MF	2004–2010	161	26	
Andrei Mărgăritescu	Romania	MF	2004–2008; 2009–2011	129	5	
Cosmin Moți	Romania	DF	2005–2012	177	6	
Cătălin Munteanu	Romania	MF	2006–2008; 2010–2014	156	12	
Marius Alexe	Romania	FW	2008–2015	135	36	
Dragoș Grigore	Romania	DF	2008–2014	126	9	
Gabriel Torje	Romania	MF	2008–2011; 2018; 2021–2022	138	25	
Laurențiu Rus	Romania	DF	2009–2014	113	4	
Steliano Filip	Romania	DF	2012–2018; 2021–2022	167	7	
Cosmin Matei	Romania	MF	2012–2016; 2021–2022	129	22	
Valentin Lazăr	Romania	MF	2013–2017; 2020	101	17	
Dorin Rotariu	Romania	MF	2013–2016	122	22	
Deian Sorescu	Romania	MF	2018–2022	123	27	
Andrei Bani	Romania	MF	2020–2025	113	10	

== League top scorers ==
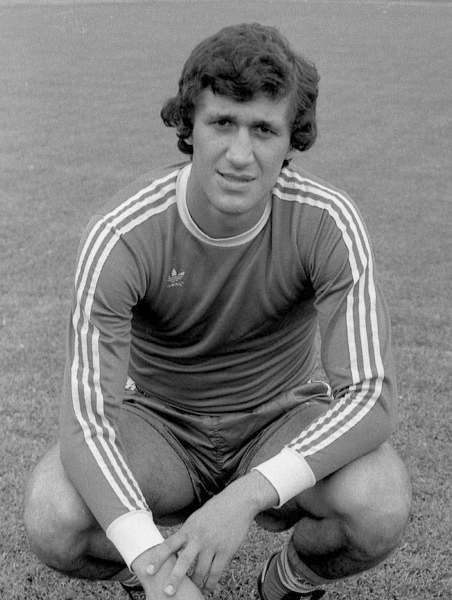
Rodion Cămătaru won the European Golden Shoe award in the 1986–87 season, having scored 44 goals.

- 1952 Titus Ozon – 17
- 1953 Titus Ozon – 12
- 1954 Alexandru Ene – 20
- 1963/1964 Constantin Frățilă- 19
- 1968/1969 Florea Dumitrache – 22
- 1970/1971 Florea Dumitrache – 15
- 1974/1975 Dudu Georgescu – 33
- 1975/1976 Dudu Georgescu – 31
- 1976/1977 Dudu Georgescu – 47
- 1977/1978 Dudu Georgescu – 24
- 1986/1987 Rodion Cămătaru – 44
- 1988/1989 Dorin Mateuț – 43
- 1991/1992 Gábor Gerstenmájer – 21 / Sulejman Demollari – 18 –
- 2000/2001 Marius Niculae – 20
- 2003/2004 Ionel Dănciulescu – 21
- 2004/2005 Claudiu Niculescu – 25
- 2006/2007 Claudiu Niculescu – 18
- 2007/2008 Ionel Dănciulescu – 21
- 2009/2010 Andrei Cristea – 16

== League titles with Dinamo ==
- 7 titles:
  - Mircea Lucescu (1964, 1965, 1971, 1973, 1975, 1977, 1990)
- 6 titles:
  - Cornel Dinu (1971, 1973, 1975, 1977, 1982, 1983)
- 5 titles:
  - Alexandru Custov (1975, 1977, 1982, 1983, 1984)
  - Constantin Eftimescu (1973, 1977, 1982, 1983, 1984)
  - Marin Ion (1975, 1977, 1982, 1983, 1984)
  - Ion Nunweiller (1962, 1963, 1964, 1965, 1971)
  - Radu Nunweiller (1964, 1965, 1971, 1973, 1975)
  - Constantin Ștefan (1962, 1963, 1964, 1965, 1971)
- 4 titles:
  - Ionel Augustin (1975, 1982, 1983, 1984)
  - Florin Cheran (1971, 1973, 1975, 1977)
  - Ilie Datcu (1962, 1963, 1964, 1965)
  - Gheorghe Ene (1962, 1963, 1964, 1965)
  - Constantin Frățilă (1962, 1963, 1964, 1965)
  - Dudu Georgescu (1975, 1977, 1982, 1983)
  - Dumitru Ivan (1962, 1963, 1964, 1965)
  - Alexandru Moldovan (1971, 1973, 1975, 1977)
  - Lică Nunweiller (1962, 1963, 1964, 1965)
  - Ion Pîrcălab (1962, 1963, 1964, 1965)
  - Cornel Popa (1962, 1963, 1964, 1965)
  - Gabriel Sandu (1971, 1973, 1975, 1977)
  - Ion Țîrcovnicu (1962, 1963, 1964, 1965)
  - Iuliu Uțu (1962, 1963, 1964, 1965)
  - Iosif Varga (1962, 1963, 1964, 1965)
