= 1975–76 FC Dinamo București season =

FC Dinamo București
1975–76 season
- Manager: Dumitru Nicolae Nicuşor (rounds 1-20) Ion Nunweiller (rounds 21-34)
- Divizia A: 2nd
- Romanian Cup: Last 32
- European Cup: First round
- Top goalscorer: Dudu Georgescu (31 goals)

The 1975–76 season was FC Dinamo București's 27th season in Divizia A. Dinamo kept up the pace with Steaua in the fight for championship, but in the end had to settle with the second position. The Romanian Cup remained the weak point, Dinamo being again eliminated in the first round. In the European Cup, Dinamo was unlucky, their first opponent being Real Madrid. After a loss in Spain, the win at home was not enough to move in the second round.

== Results ==
Divizia A
Round	Date	Opponent	Stadium	Result
1	17 August 1975	CFR Cluj	A	1-3
2	3 September 1975	Sportul Studențesc	H	0-1
3	28 August 1975	ASA Târgu Mureș	H	3-2
4	31 August 1975	Olimpia Satu Mare	A	1-2
5	7 September 1975	Jiul Petroșani	H	5-0
6	14 September 1975	FC Constanța	A	1-0
7	22 October 1975	Rapid București	H	3-1
8	5 October 1975	FCM Reșița	H	4-0
9	15 October 1975	U Craiova	A	2-1
10	19 October 1975	U Cluj	H	4-2
11	26 October 1975	Poli Timișoara	A	4-0
12	2 November 1975	Steaua București	H	3-3
13	5 November 1975	Poli Iaşi	H	2-0
14	19 November 1975	UTA	A	0-1
15	23 November 1975	SC Bacău	H	2-0
16	7 December 1975	FC Argeş	A	1-2
17	10 December 1975	FC Bihor	H	3-1
18	7 March 1976	CFR Cluj	H	4-2
19	14 March 1976	Sportul Studențesc	A	0-0
20	17 March 1976	ASA Târgu Mureș	A	0-2
21	28 March 1976	Olimpia Satu Mare	H	2-0
22	31 March 1976	Jiul Petroșani	A	0-0
23	18 April 1976	FC Constanța	H	1-1
24	25 April 1976	Rapid București	A	5-2
25	28 April 1976	FCM Reșița	A	1-2
26	2 May 1976	U Craiova	H	2-0
27	6 May 1976	U Cluj	A	0-1
28	16 May 1976	Poli Timișoara	H	2-2
29	23 May 1976	Steaua București	A	1-1
30	26 May 1976	Poli Iaşi	A	1-0
31	30 May 1976	UTA	H	1-1
32	9 June 1976	SC Bacău	A	1-0
33	13 June 1976	FC Argeş	H	7-1
34	19 June 1976	FC Bihor	A	1-1

Cupa României
Round	Date	Opponent	Stadium	Result
Last 32	29 February 1976	ASA Târgu Mureș	Târgu Mureș	2-4

== European Cup ==
First round

17 September 1975
19:00

Real Madrid	4 – 1	FC Dinamo București
Santillana 8', 90'; Martínez 63'; Netzer 74'		Lucescu 75'

Santiago Bernabéu Stadium, Madrid
Attendance: 20,341
Referee: Milivoje Gugulovic (Yugoslavia)

1 October 1975
17:30

FC Dinamo București	1 – 0	Real Madrid
Sătmăreanu 33'

Stadionul 23 August, Bucharest
Attendance: 50,000
Referee: Giulio Ciacci (Italy)

Real Madrid CF won 4-2 on aggregate

== Squad ==
Goalkeepers: Mircea Constantinescu, Constantin Traian Ștefan.

Defenders: Florin Cheran, Augustin Deleanu, Vasile Dobrău, Teodor Lucuță, Gabriel Sandu, Alexandru Sătmăreanu.

Midfielders: Cornel Dinu, Ion Marin, Ion Mateescu, Radu Nunweiller, Cristian Vrînceanu.

Forwards: Ionel Augustin, Alexandru Custov, Florea Dumitrache, Dudu Georgescu, Mircea Lucescu, Marian Vlad, Toma Zamfir.

== Transfers ==
Alexandru Moldovan is transferred to Jiul Petroşani.
