= 1973–74 FC Dinamo București season =

FC Dinamo București
1973–74 season
- Manager: Ion Nunweiller (rounds 1-17), Dumitru Nicolae Nicuşor (rounds 18-34)
- Divizia A: 2nd
- Romanian Cup: Last 32
- European Cup: Second round
- Top goalscorer: Dudu Georgescu (21 goals)

The 1973–74 season was FC Dinamo București's 25th season in Divizia A. The competition with Universitatea Craiova for the title repeated, but this time the Craiova side won the championship by one point. In this season, Dinamo brought Dudu Georgescu from CSM Reşiţa the player that will become the best scorer in history for Dinamo. In the European Cup, they surpass Northern Ireland's Crusaders Belfast (The 11–0 home game against Northern Ireland's team is still the biggest margin of victory in the history of the European Cup), but fail against Atlético Madrid (0–2 and 2–2), the team of Capon, Irueta, Heredia and Ayala.

== Results ==
Divizia A
Round	Date	Opponent	Stadium	Result
1	12 August 1973	FC Constanța	H	1-1
2	15 August 1973	Petrolul Ploiești	A	1-2
3	19 August 1973	ASA Târgu Mureș	H	5-1
4	26 August 1973	UTA	A	2-1
5	2 September 1973	Sportul Studențesc	H	0-3
6	9 September 1973	Steagul Roșu Brașov	H	3-2
7	15 September 1973	Poli Iaşi	A	1-0
8	30 September 1973	Poli Timișoara	H	2-1
9	7 October 1973	Rapid București	A	1-0
10	21 October 1973	U Craiova	A	1-1
11	28 October 1973	U Cluj	H	0-1
12	4 November 1973	CSM Reșița	A	1-2
13	11 November 1973	Steaua București	H	0-2
14	18 November 1973	SC Bacău	H	2-0
15	15 November 1973	CFR Cluj	A	1-1
16	2 December 1973	Jiul Petroșani	H	1-0
17	9 December 1973	FC Argeş	A	2-3
18	3 March 1974	FC Constanța	A	0-0
19	10 March 1974	Petrolul Ploiești	H	2-0
20	17 March 1974	ASA Târgu Mureș	A	0-0
21	27 March 1974	UTA	H	4-1
22	31 March 1974	Sportul Studențesc	A	2-0
23	7 April 1974	Steagul Roșu Brașov	A	0-0
24	28 April 1974	Poli Iaşi	H	5-2
25	2 May 1974	Poli Timișoara	A	1-3
26	5 May 1974	Rapid București	H	1-1
27	8 May 1974	U Craiova	H	1-0
28	12 May 1974	U Cluj	A	3-0
29	19 May 1974	CSM Reșița	H	2-1
30	26 May 1974	Steaua București	A	3-1
31	2 June 1974	SC Bacău	A	1-2
32	9 June 1974	CFR Cluj	H	3-1
33	16 June 1974	Jiul Petroșani	A	1-1
34	19 June 1974	FC Argeş	H	7-0

Cupa României
Round	Date	Opponent	Stadium	Result
Last 32	21 November 1973	Șantierul Naval Oltenița	Giurgiu	0-1

== European Cup ==
First round

19 September 1973
16:30

Crusaders Belfast	0 – 1	FC Dinamo București
		Sălceanu 1'

Windsor Park, Belfast
Attendance: 2,000
Referee: Pierre Wouters (Belgium)

3 October 1973
15:30

FC Dinamo București	11 – 0	Crusaders Belfast
Georgescu 7', 14', 47', 63'; R.Nunweiller 19', 40', 75', 81'; Dinu 52'; Dumitrache 67'; Beckett 88' (o.g.)

Stadionul Dinamo, Bucharest
Attendance: 12,000
Referee: Dogan Babacan (Turkey)

Dinamo București won 12-0 on aggregate

Second round

24 October 1973
15:00

FC Dinamo București	0 – 2	Atlético Madrid
		Becerra 19'; Eusebio 88'

Stadionul Dinamo, Bucharest
Attendance: 10,000
Referee: Josef Bucek (Austria)

7 November 1973
15:00

Atlético Madrid	2 – 2	FC Dinamo București
Ayala 9'; Capón 73'		Lucescu 2'; Georgescu 12'

Vicente Calderón Stadium, Madrid
Attendance: 50,000
Referee: John Keith Taylor (England)

Atlético Madrid won 4-2 on aggregate

== Squad ==
Goalkeepers: Iosif Cavai, Mircea Constantinescu.

Defenders: Florin Cheran, Augustin Deleanu, Cornel Dinu, Vasile Dobrău, Teodor Lucuță, Mircea Marian, Gabriel Sandu.

Midfielders: Gheorghe Gojgaru, Radu Nunweiller, Panfil Radu, Alexandru Sătmăreanu.

Forwards: Alexandru Custov, Florea Dumitrache, Florian Dumitrescu, Dudu Georgescu, Mircea Lucescu, Alexandru Moldovan, Viorel Sălceanu, Cristian Vrînceanu.

== Transfers ==
Dudu Georgescu is brought from CSM Reşiţa. Cristian Vrînceanu is promoted from the youth team.
