= 1979–80 FC Dinamo București season =

FC Dinamo București
1979–80 season
- Manager: Angelo Niculescu
- Divizia A: 5th
- Romanian Cup: Last 32
- UEFA Cup: 2nd round

The 1979–80 season was FC Dinamo București's 31st season in Divizia A. The change at the manager's level (Angelo Niculescu for Ion Nunweiller) didn't produce the desired results and Dinamo didn't matter in the fight for the title, ending far from the first two teams. Also, in the Romanian Cup Dinamo was eliminated in the first round, by the second division team Rapid București.

In the UEFA Cup, Dinamo eliminated Alki Larnaca from Cyprus, after an incredible 9–0 away win, but is eliminated (partially because of the referee) by Eintracht Frankfurt, team of Pezzey, Grabowsky and Holzenbein (2-0 and 0–3 in prolongation).

== Results ==
Divizia A
Round	Date	Opponent	Stadium	Result
1	12 August 1979	Chimia Râmnicu Vâlcea	H	2-0
2	19 August 1979	SC Bacău	A	0-1
3	24 August 1979	Sportul Studențesc	H	0-0
4	2 September 1979	Olimpia Satu Mare	H	2-0
5	5 September 1979	FC Argeş	A	1-1
6	9 September 1979	Steaua București	H	1-1
7	15 September 1979	ASA Târgu Mureș	H	5-1
8	23 September 1979	U Craiova	A	0-1
9	29 September 1979	Poli Timișoara	H	1-1
10	8 October 1979	U Cluj	A	1-0
11	20 October 1979	Poli Iași	H	4-1
12	27 October 1979	CS Târgoviște	A	1-3
13	3 November 1979	FCM Galați	H	1-1
14	11 November 1979	FC Olt	A	3-2
15	14 November 1979	FC Baia Mare	H	4-0
16	21 November 1979	Jiul Petroșani	A	1-3
17	25 November 1979	Gloria Buzău	H	2-1
18	2 December 1979	Chimia Râmnicu Vâlcea	A	1-3
19	5 December 1979	SC Bacău	H	1-0
20	2 March 1980	Sportul Studențesc	A	1-2
21	8 March 1980	Olimpia Satu Mare	A	3-0
22	12 March 1980	FC Argeş	H	3-2
23	16 March 1980	Steaua București	H	1-1
24	23 March 1980	ASA Târgu Mureș	A	0-0
25	26 March 1980	U Craiova	H	2-2
26	6 April 1980	Poli Timișoara	A	0-1
27	9 April 1980	U Cluj	H	1-2
28	13 April 1980	Poli Iași	A	0-1
29	20 April 1980	CS Târgoviște	H	1-2
30	26 April 1980	FCM Galați	A	0-2
31	4 May 1980	FC Olt	H	3-0
32	11 May 1980	FC Baia Mare	A	1-0
33	21 May 1980	Jiul Petroșani	H	2-2
34	25 May 1980	Gloria Buzău	A	1-0

Cupa României
Round	Date	Opponent	Stadium	Result
Last 32	9 December 1979	Rapid București	A	1-2

== UEFA Cup ==
First round

19 September 1979
15:00

FC Dinamo București	3–0	Alki Larnaca
Mulţescu 33'; Georgescu 39'; Vrînceanu 62'

Stadionul Dinamo, Bucharest
Attendance: 17,000
Referee: Arseni Hoxha (Albania)

4 October 1979
15:00

Alki Larnaca	0–9	FC Dinamo București
		Georgescu 10' (pen.); Augustin 20'; Vrînceanuu 22', 77'; Ţălnar 51'; Mulţescu 52'; Moldovan 62'

GSP Stadium, Larnaca
Attendance: 35,000
Referee: Edward Gerald Morgan (Wales)

Dinamo București won 12-0 on aggregate

Second round

24 October 1979
15:00

FC Dinamo București	2–0	Eintracht Frankfurt
Mulţescu 20' (pen.); Augustin 88'

Stadionul Dinamo, Bucharest
Referee: Ian Foote (Scotland)

7 November 1979
20:00

Eintracht Frankfurt	3 – 0 (a.e.t.)	FC Dinamo București
Cha 73'; Hölzenbein 90'; Nickel 93'

Waldstadion, Frankfurt
Attendance: 45,000
Referee: Erik Fredriksson (Sweden)

Eintracht Frankfurt won 3-2 on aggregate

== Squad ==
Goalkeepers: Constantin Eftimescu, Constantin Traian Ștefan.

Defenders: Adrian Bădilaș, Florin Cheran, Cornel Dinu, Teodor Lucuță, Alexandru Sătmăreanu, Ioan Mărginean.

Midfielders: Ionel Augustin, Alexandru Custov, Ion Marin, Ion Moldovan, Gheorghe Mulțescu, Nelu Stănescu, Dorel Zamfir.

Forwards: Ion Apostol, Dudu Georgescu, Emilian Tevi, Cornel Țălnar, Cristian Vrînceanu.
