= Sătmăreanu =

Sătmăreanu is a Romanian surname. Notable people with the surname include:

- Alexandru Sătmăreanu (born 1952), Romanian footballer
- Lajos Sătmăreanu (1944–2025), Romanian footballer of Hungarian descent
