= Constantin Ștefan =

Constantin Ștefan may refer to:

- Constantin Ștefan (footballer, born 1939) (1939–2012), Romanian football left back
- Constantin Ștefan (footballer, born 1951), Romanian football goalkeeper
