= 1972–73 Divizia A =

55th season of top-tier football league in Romania

Divizia A
- Season: 1972–73
- Champions: Dinamo București
- Top goalscorer: Ion Oblemenco (21)

The 1972–73 Divizia A was the fifty-fifth season of Divizia A, the top-level football league of Romania. With 7 rounds before the end of the season, the Romanian Football Federation decided to raise the number of teams from 16 to 18 in the next season and because of this it was decided that no team will relegate in this season.

== Teams ==
Location of teams in 1972-73 Divizia A

== League table ==
Pos	Team	Pld	W	D	L	GF	GA	GD	Pts	Qualification
1	Dinamo București (C)	30	17	5	8	51	32	+19	39	Qualification to European Cup first round
2	Universitatea Craiova	30	15	9	6	54	36	+18	39	Qualification to UEFA Cup first round
3	Argeș Pitești	30	14	7	9	44	28	+16	35	Qualification to UEFA Cup first round
4	SC Bacău	30	13	8	9	36	35	+1	34	Invitation to Balkans Cup
5	CFR Cluj	30	11	11	8	33	33	0	33	
6	Steaua București	30	9	13	8	36	30	+6	31	
7	Steagul Roşu Brașov	30	11	8	11	39	24	+15	30	
8	FC Constanța	30	10	8	12	35	34	+1	28	
9	UTA Arad	30	8	12	10	33	36	−3	28	
10	Jiul Petroșani	30	11	6	13	38	43	−5	28	
11	Petrolul Ploiești	30	9	10	11	22	32	−10	28	
12	ASA Târgu Mureș	30	12	3	15	37	47	−10	27	
13	Rapid București	30	7	12	11	29	29	0	26	
14	CSM Reșița	30	8	10	12	34	39	−5	26	
15	Sportul Studențesc București	30	6	13	11	32	50	−18	25	
16	Universitatea Cluj	30	7	9	14	25	50	−25	23	

Source: LT
Rules for classification: 1) points; 2) goal difference; 3) number of goals scored
(C) Champions

=== Results ===
Home \ Away	ASA	ARG	BAC	CFR	RES	CON	UCR	DIN	JIU	PET	RAP	SPO	SRB	STE	UTA	UCL
ASA Târgu Mureș	—	4–3	2–0	0–1	2–0	4–3	2–3	1–0	1–0	2–1	1–1	4–2	1–0	1–0	2–1	4–1
Argeș Pitești	3–0	—	0–0	3–2	1–0	1–1	2–0	1–0	2–0	3–0	2–0	1–0	1–1	1–1	3–0	5–0
Bacău	1–0	2–1	—	1–1	2–0	2–0	3–2	2–1	4–1	2–0	2–1	1–1	2–0	2–2	0–0	0–0
CFR Cluj	3–1	1–0	1–0	—	1–1	3–0	1–1	1–1	3–1	0–1	0–0	0–0	1–0	1–0	1–1	2–1
Reșița	2–0	1–0	1–1	0–2	—	1–2	2–2	4–1	3–0	1–1	0–0	5–2	0–0	2–0	3–0	4–2
Constanța	2–0	1–1	5–0	1–0	1–1	—	1–0	0–1	3–1	0–0	0–1	4–1	1–1	1–0	1–1	4–0
Universitatea Craiova	1–0	1–1	1–0	4–2	2–0	1–0	—	1–0	4–1	0–0	2–1	4–1	0–1	0–0	1–0	3–0
Dinamo București	2–0	3–1	2–2	4–0	2–0	2–0	5–2	—	2–1	3–1	0–2	3–3	1–0	2–1	2–1	3–1
Jiul Petroșani	1–1	2–1	3–0	2–0	2–0	1–0	1–1	2–1	—	0–0	1–0	3–0	1–0	0–1	5–1	1–1
Petrolul Ploiești	2–1	1–2	1–0	0–0	1–0	0–1	2–2	1–1	0–0	—	1–0	3–0	1–0	0–0	1–0	2–1
Rapid București	3–0	0–1	3–1	0–1	0–0	2–1	4–6	0–0	4–1	1–0	—	2–2	1–1	1–1	0–0	0–1
Sportul Studențesc București	1–0	1–1	0–2	2–2	1–1	1–0	1–1	3–0	2–1	2–1	1–1	—	0–0	0–0	1–4	2–0
Steagul Roşu Brașov	5–1	3–1	0–1	2–0	5–1	5–0	1–1	0–1	1–0	4–0	1–0	1–1	—	0–2	3–0	2–1
Steaua București	4–2	1–0	0–1	1–1	4–0	1–1	2–6	0–2	3–0	2–1	0–0	4–1	1–1	—	2–2	3–1
UTA Arad	0–0	2–1	4–1	3–0	2–1	1–1	1–0	0–1	2–4	4–0	1–1	0–0	1–0	0–0	—	1–1
Universitatea Cluj	1–0	0–1	2–1	2–2	0–0	1–0	1–2	1–5	2–2	0–0	1–0	1–0	2–1	0–0	0–0	—

Source: LT (in Romanian)
Legend: Blue = home team win; Yellow = draw; Red = away team win.

== Top goalscorers ==
Rank	Player	Club	Goals
1	Ion Oblemenco	Universitatea Craiova	21
2	Florea Dumitrache	Dinamo București	15
3	Nicolae Pescaru	Steagul Roşu Brașov	14
4	Ion Roșu	Argeș Pitești	13
4	Adalbert Rozsnyai	Jiul Petroșani	13

== Champion squad ==
Dinamo București

Goalkeepers: Mircea Constantinescu (10 / 0); Constantin Eftimescu (1 / 0); Iosif Cavai (12 / 0); Adrian Rămureanu (8 / 0).
Defenders: Florin Cheran (16 / 0); Vasile Dobrău (27 / 0); Gabriel Sandu (28 / 0); Augustin Deleanu (23 / 0); Nicolae Petre (10 / 0); Alexandru Sătmăreanu (16 / 0); Vasile Cosma (6 / 1); Teodor Lucuță (5 / 0).
Midfielders: Mircea Stoenescu (8 / 1); Cornel Dinu (23 / 2); Ion Batacliu (3 / 0).
Forwards: Mircea Lucescu (28 / 12); Radu Nunweiller (30 / 7); Florea Dumitrache (26 / 15); Florian Dumitrescu (26 / 5); Alexandru Moldovan (25 / 2); Viorel Sălceanu (17 / 2); Doru Popescu (24 / 4); Marin Roșu (2 / 0).
(league appearances and goals listed in brackets)

Manager: Ion Nunweiller.

== See also ==
- 1972–73 Divizia B
- 1972–73 Divizia C
- 1972–73 County Championship
