= Vasile Dobrău =

Romanian footballer

Personal information
- Date of birth: 14 June 1953 (age 73)
- Place of birth: București, Romania
- Position: Centre-back

Youth career
- 1965–1969: Dinamo București

Senior career*
Years	Team	Apps	(Gls)
1969–1978	Dinamo București	181	(4)
1980–1982	Universitatea Cluj	48	(0)
1982–1983	Armătura Zalău	26	(9)
1984–1989	Dacia Mecanica Orăștie (Note: The statistics for the 1983–84 and 1984–85 Divizia C seasons are unavailable.)	72	(12)
Total		327	(25)

International career
1972–1977	Romania	5	(0)

Managerial career
- 1984–1989: Dacia Mecanica Orăștie
- 1989–1990: Unirea Slobozia
- 1990–1991: Metalurgistul Slatina
- 1993–1994: Rocar București
- 1997–1998: CFR Cluj
- 1998–1999: Armătura Zalău
- 1999–2000: Metalurgistul Cugir
- 2004–2005: Universitatea Cluj (assistant)
- 2009–2010: Real de Banjul
- 2012–2014: Kuwait SC (assistant)
- * Club domestic league appearances and goals

Vasile Dobrău (born 14 June 1953) is a Romanian former professional footballer who played as a centre-back. He was also a manager, assistant coach and youth coach.

== Club career ==
Dobrău was born on 14 June 1953 in București, Romania and began playing football in 1965 at Dinamo București's youth center, where his first coaches were Petre Steinbach and Gheorghe Timar. In 1969, coach Nicolae Dumitru brought him to train with the senior squad, giving him his Divizia A debut on 22 July 1970 in a 2–0 away loss to ASA Târgu Mureș. Over the course of nine seasons spent with The Red Dogs, Dobrău won three Divizia A titles. In the first title-winning season he was used by coach Ion Nunweiller in 27 games. In the second Nicolae Dumitru sent him on the field 32 times. For the third he worked with Ion Nunweiller again who gave him 26 appearances in which he scored three goals. During his period spent at Dinamo, Dobrău also played 12 games in European competitions, making appearances against AC Milan, FC Köln and Real Madrid, helping the team earn a 1–0 home victory against the latter in the 1975–76 European Cup. His tenure at Dinamo saw him play alongside famous players of Romanian football such as Florea Dumitrache, Cornel Dinu, Dudu Georgescu, Mircea Lucescu, and the Nunweiller brothers Ion, Lică and Radu.

In 1978, Dobrău wanted to play for Universitatea Cluj, but Dinamo did not approve the transfer, thus ending up being suspended for one and a half years before being able to play for "U". He stayed with The Red Caps for two and a half seasons, of which in the last one, the team was relegated to Divizia B. Dobrău would end up playing in Divizia B, as in 1982 he joined Armătura Zalău for one and a half seasons. In 1984 he went to Dacia Mecanica Orăștie, helping it achieve promotion as a player-coach from Divizia C to Divizia B. Throughout his career, Dobrău earned 229 Divizia A matches in which he scored four goals and made 98 appearances with 21 goals in Divizia B.

== International career ==
Dobrău played five games for Romania, making his debut at age 19 under coach Angelo Niculescu on 20 September 1972 in a 1–1 draw against Finland in the 1974 World Cup qualifiers. His second appearance was in the same qualifiers, a 2–0 victory against Albania. He then played in a 1–0 loss to Bulgaria in the 1973–76 Balkan Cup final. His last appearance for the national team was in a 6–4 home loss during the 1978 World Cup qualifiers against Yugoslavia when coach Ștefan Kovács sent him at half-time to replace Alexandru Sătmăreanu.

== Managerial career ==
Dobrău started his coaching career in Divizia C at Dacia Mecanica Orăștie while still being an active player, helping the team earn promotion to Divizia B. After a few seasons spent there with Mecanica, he returned to Divizia C football at Unirea Slobozia which he also helped get promoted to Divizia B. In the following years he continued to work for teams from the Romanian lower leagues such as Metalurgistul Slatina, Rocar București, CFR Cluj, Armătura Zalău and Metalurgistul Cugir. In the 2004–05 Divizia B season he was Marin Ion's assistant at Universitatea Cluj, helping the team earn a 7th place. He had his first spell abroad in 2009 at Gambian club, Real de Banjul and from 2012 until 2014, Dobrău worked again as Marin Ion's assistant at Kuwaiti club, Kuwait SC, winning one Kuwaiti Premier League and two AFC Cups. Throughout the years, Dobrău worked as a federal observer for the Romanian Football Federation between 1991 and 1993, as a sports director at "U" Cluj from 1994 until 1997 and also as a youth coach.

== Honours ==
=== Player ===
Dinamo București

- Divizia A: 1972–73, 1974–75, 1976–77

Dacia Mecanica Orăștie

- Divizia C: 1984–85

=== Manager ===
Dacia Mecanica Orăștie

- Divizia C: 1984–85

Unirea Slobozia

- Divizia C: 1988–89
