= 1976–77 Divizia A =

59th season of top-tier football league in Romania

Divizia A
- Season: 1976–77
- Champions: Dinamo București
- Top goalscorer: Dudu Georgescu (47)

The 1976–77 Divizia A was the fifty-ninth season of Divizia A, the top-level football league of Romania.

== Teams ==
Location of teams in 1976-77 Divizia A

== League table ==
Pos	Team	Pld	W	D	L	GF	GA	GD	Pts	Qualification or relegation
1	Dinamo București (C)	34	20	9	5	84	34	+50	49	Qualification to European Cup first round
2	Steaua București	34	20	5	9	72	41	+31	45	Qualification to UEFA Cup first round
3	Universitatea Craiova	34	16	9	9	54	36	+18	41	Qualification to Cup Winners' Cup first round
4	ASA Târgu Mureș	34	16	5	13	50	40	+10	37	Qualification to UEFA Cup first round
5	Jiul Petroșani	34	16	5	13	57	49	+8	37	Invitation to Balkans Cup
6	Politehnica Timișoara	34	16	4	14	44	37	+7	36	
7	Sportul Studenţesc București	34	13	9	12	34	34	0	35	
8	Politehnica Iași	34	12	9	13	43	33	+10	33	
9	Bihor Oradea	34	13	7	14	48	53	−5	33	
10	SC Bacău	34	13	7	14	34	39	−5	33	
11	Argeș Pitești	34	12	9	13	40	47	−7	33	
12	UTA Arad	34	13	7	14	56	64	−8	33	
13	FCM Reșița	34	13	6	15	43	55	−12	32	
14	Corvinul Hunedoara	34	10	11	13	32	40	−8	31	
15	FC Constanța	34	12	6	16	43	45	−2	30	
16	Rapid București (R)	34	11	8	15	38	49	−11	30	Relegation to Divizia B
17	Progresul București (R)	34	11	5	18	37	69	−32	27	Relegation to Divizia B
18	FCM Galați (R)	34	6	5	23	31	75	−44	17	Relegation to Divizia B

Source: LT
Rules for classification: 1) points; 2) goal difference; 3) number of goals scored
(C) Champions; (R) Relegated

=== Results ===
Home \ Away	ASA	ARG	BAC	BHO	CON	COR	UCR	DIN	RES	GAL	JIU	PIA	PRO	RAP	SPO	STE	POL	UTA
ASA Târgu Mureș	—	2–0	0–0	2–2	3–1	2–2	3–0	0–0	1–0	4–1	5–2	1–0	4–0	6–1	1–0	2–0	3–1	2–0
Argeș Pitești	0–1	—	2–0	3–3	2–0	1–1	2–2	2–2	2–1	1–0	2–0	2–0	3–3	1–0	2–0	2–1	0–0	2–1
Bacău	1–0	1–0	—	2–2	1–0	0–0	1–2	0–1	2–0	5–0	2–1	0–0	2–1	3–0	2–0	2–1	1–0	1–0
Bihor Oradea	1–0	1–0	2–0	—	2–1	1–1	0–2	3–0	3–0	3–2	2–1	0–0	4–2	2–0	0–3	0–2	1–0	3–1
Constanța	1–0	1–2	2–1	4–1	—	4–1	2–3	2–1	5–0	2–0	4–1	1–1	0–0	2–1	0–0	0–1	2–1	3–0
Corvinul Hunedoara	1–0	1–1	2–2	0–1	0–0	—	1–0	0–2	6–1	1–0	2–2	1–0	2–0	2–0	0–1	2–1	1–0	1–1
Universitatea Craiova	1–1	3–1	3–0	1–1	0–0	2–0	—	1–1	1–1	3–1	2–0	1–0	5–0	3–0	1–0	0–2	1–0	3–1
Dinamo București	5–1	4–1	2–1	4–1	4–0	2–0	2–1	—	5–0	4–0	3–1	1–0	4–1	3–1	7–1	5–2	2–0	7–0
FCM Reșița	2–1	1–2	2–1	1–0	2–0	2–1	3–2	1–1	—	4–1	2–1	1–1	4–1	0–0	2–0	1–3	1–0	3–0
Galați	0–3	1–0	0–0	3–3	1–3	0–1	1–1	0–2	3–1	—	0–1	1–0	3–2	1–0	1–0	1–1	2–3	1–1
Jiul Petroșani	4–0	2–0	2–0	2–1	2–0	1–1	1–0	2–2	1–0	4–2	—	2–0	0–1	5–0	0–0	2–1	4–0	6–3
Politehnica Iași	2–0	2–0	3–0	4–1	3–0	4–0	1–2	0–0	1–1	2–0	1–2	—	0–1	0–0	3–1	1–1	2–1	4–2
Progresul București	0–1	1–0	4–2	2–1	1–0	2–0	1–5	2–1	2–1	2–1	1–2	0–1	—	3–3	1–0	0–2	0–2	2–2
Rapid București	2–0	0–0	0–1	2–0	3–1	1–0	0–0	1–0	1–1	3–2	3–0	0–1	6–0	—	1–1	2–0	2–1	2–1
Sportul Studențesc București	2–0	1–0	1–0	2–1	2–2	1–0	1–1	1–1	1–0	3–0	0–0	3–1	4–0	1–1	—	0–1	1–0	3–2
Steaua București	5–0	6–1	3–0	2–1	1–0	3–0	3–2	2–2	3–1	6–1	3–1	2–1	1–1	4–1	1–0	—	2–2	5–0
Politehnica Timișoara	1–0	2–2	3–0	2–0	1–0	1–0	1–0	3–1	2–3	3–0	3–0	2–1	1–0	3–1	0–0	2–1	—	2–1
UTA Arad	2–1	3–1	0–0	2–1	3–0	1–1	4–0	3–3	1–0	3–1	3–2	3–3	2–0	1–0	2–0	5–0	2–1	—

Source: LT (in Romanian)
Legend: Blue = home team win; Yellow = draw; Red = away team win.

== Top goalscorers ==
Rank	Player	Club	Goals
1	Dudu Georgescu	Dinamo București	47
2	Florea Dumitrache	Jiul Petroșani	20
3	Marin Radu	Argeș Pitești	18
4	Viorel Năstase	Steaua București	17
5	Ladislau Brosovszky	UTA Arad	16
5	Anghel Iordănescu	Steaua București	16

== Champion squad ==
Dinamo București

Goalkeepers: Constantin Ștefan (31 / 0); Constantin Eftimescu (3 / 0).
Defenders: Florin Cheran (34 / 3); Gabriel Sandu (29 / 1); Vasile Dobrău (26 / 3); Teodor Lucuță (19 / 0); Alexandru Sătmăreanu (34 / 5); Ladislau Ghiță (11 / 0); Marin Ion (21 / 1).
Midfielders: Alexandru Moldovan (30 / 3); Cornel Dinu (31 / 6).
Forwards: Alexandru Custov (33 / 2); Dudu Georgescu (31 / 47); Ion Moldovan (25 / 2); Cristian Vrînceanu (25 / 0); Adalbert Rozsnyai (20 / 3); Mircea Lucescu (19 / 7); Vasile Chitaru (7 / 0); Sorin Georgescu (1 / 0).
(league appearances and goals listed in brackets)

Manager: Ion Nunweiller.

== Attendances ==
#	Club	Average
1	Craiova	22,118
2	Dinamo 1948	21,765
3	Steaua	21,471
4	Timișoara	16,059
5	FC Rapid	15,706
6	Progresul	14,853
7	Hunedoara	14,353
8	Bihor	12,765
9	UTA Arad	12,235
10	Sportul Studențesc	11,835
11	Bacău	11,706
12	Reșița	10,529
13	Iași	10,176
14	Galați	10,059
15	Argeș	9,706
16	Constanța	9,618
17	Târgu Mureș	7,324
18	Jiul	6,912

== See also ==
- 1976–77 Divizia B
- 1976–77 Divizia C
- 1976–77 County Championship
