= 1974–75 Divizia A =

57th season of top-tier football league in Romania

Divizia A
- Season: 1974–75
- Champions: Dinamo București
- Top goalscorer: Dudu Georgescu (33)

The 1974–75 Divizia A was the 57th season of Divizia A, the top-level football league of Romania.

== Teams ==
Location of teams in 1974-75 Divizia A

== League table ==
Pos	Team	Pld	W	D	L	GF	GA	GD	Pts	Qualification or relegation
1	Dinamo București (C)	34	19	5	10	63	37	+26	43	Qualification to European Cup first round
2	ASA Târgu Mureș	34	18	4	12	47	38	+9	40	Qualification to UEFA Cup first round
3	Universitatea Craiova	34	15	9	10	51	32	+19	39	Qualification to UEFA Cup first round
4	Sportul Studențesc București	34	15	6	13	48	49	−1	36	Invitation to Balkans Cup
5	Steaua București	34	15	5	14	59	45	+14	35	
6	FCM Reșița	34	15	5	14	54	48	+6	35	
7	Argeș Pitești	34	15	4	15	51	43	+8	34	
8	UTA Arad	34	15	4	15	45	39	+6	34	
9	Olimpia Satu Mare	34	13	7	14	38	44	−6	33	
10	FC Constanța	34	13	7	14	39	45	−6	33	
11	Politehnica Timișoara	34	13	7	14	32	40	−8	33	
12	Universitatea Cluj	34	12	9	13	29	38	−9	33	
13	Politehnica Iași	34	15	3	16	45	56	−11	33	
14	Jiul Petroșani	34	13	6	15	41	36	+5	32	
15	CFR Cluj	34	11	10	13	26	34	−8	32	
16	Steagul Roşu Brașov (R)	34	12	7	15	39	30	+9	31	Relegation to Divizia B
17	Chimia Râmnicu Vâlcea (R)	34	11	9	14	35	54	−19	31	Relegation to Divizia B
18	FC Galați (R)	34	10	5	19	27	61	−34	25	Relegation to Divizia B

Source: LT
Rules for classification: 1) points; 2) goal difference; 3) number of goals scored
(C) Champions; (R) Relegated

=== Results ===
Home \ Away	ASA	ARG	CFR	CON	UCR	DIN	RES	GAL	JIU	OLI	PIA	RAM	SPO	SRB	STE	POL	UTA	UCL
ASA Târgu Mureș	—	2–0	2–1	3–0	0–0	2–0	2–1	4–2	1–0	2–0	3–1	3–1	2–0	2–0	1–1	2–0	2–1	2–0
Argeș Pitești	1–0	—	2–1	3–0	2–1	2–2	1–1	2–0	1–0	3–0	4–2	2–0	5–0	1–0	2–0	2–0	2–0	1–2
CFR Cluj	1–0	1–0	—	0–0	0–0	0–2	1–1	0–0	0–0	3–1	2–1	1–1	1–0	0–0	1–0	1–0	2–1	0–0
Constanța	2–0	3–1	2–0	—	2–1	1–1	2–0	4–1	3–1	0–0	3–0	1–1	1–0	1–0	2–0	0–0	0–1	4–1
Universitatea Craiova	2–3	2–0	1–1	1–0	—	3–0	3–1	6–0	0–0	3–1	5–2	3–0	3–1	1–0	2–1	1–0	2–1	5–0
Dinamo București	5–1	3–2	1–0	3–3	1–0	—	2–1	2–0	3–1	5–0	1–2	5–0	3–0	1–0	2–0	2–2	2–0	2–0
FCM Reșița	0–1	3–2	2–1	3–0	1–0	2–2	—	1–0	2–0	5–1	2–1	4–1	1–1	1–0	2–0	2–0	3–1	2–1
Galați	2–0	2–1	0–2	1–1	1–2	2–1	2–1	—	1–0	0–1	2–1	2–1	1–3	1–1	0–0	1–0	1–0	2–1
Jiul Petroșani	2–1	1–0	3–1	3–0	2–0	2–0	3–1	2–0	—	2–0	0–1	5–0	0–3	0–0	0–0	6–0	2–1	1–0
Olimpia Satu Mare	1–1	2–0	1–0	2–0	0–0	1–0	1–1	0–0	2–0	—	3–0	3–0	4–1	2–1	2–1	2–0	3–1	1–2
Politehnica Iași	1–0	2–0	3–1	3–1	0–0	3–4	5–4	3–0	1–0	1–0	—	3–0	1–0	2–0	1–1	1–0	2–1	0–1
Chimia Râmnicu Vâlcea	2–0	2–2	2–0	2–0	1–1	0–2	2–0	2–0	1–0	2–0	4–1	—	1–0	1–0	2–0	1–1	0–0	0–0
Sportul Studențesc București	1–0	3–3	1–2	2–1	1–0	1–0	1–0	3–0	3–3	0–0	3–1	3–2	—	2–1	4–4	1–2	1–2	2–0
Steagul Roşu Brașov	1–2	1–0	4–1	0–1	0–0	2–1	4–1	3–0	2–0	3–1	1–0	5–1	0–1	—	3–1	3–1	2–0	0–0
Steaua București	6–2	3–1	2–0	2–0	3–0	1–3	2–1	6–2	3–0	1–0	5–0	4–0	2–3	1–0	—	2–0	0–2	4–2
Politehnica Timișoara	1–1	1–0	1–0	2–0	3–1	2–1	0–1	2–0	1–1	3–1	1–0	1–0	2–0	2–2	2–1	—	0–0	0–2
UTA Arad	1–0	3–1	0–1	3–1	2–1	0–1	3–2	4–1	2–0	2–1	4–0	1–1	1–2	0–0	3–1	2–0	—	1–0
Universitatea Cluj	1–0	0–2	0–0	4–0	1–1	1–0	2–1	1–0	2–1	1–1	0–0	1–1	0–0	1–0	0–1	0–2	2–1	—

Source: LT (in Romanian)
Legend: Blue = home team win; Yellow = draw; Red = away team win.

== Top goalscorers ==
Rank	Player	Club	Goals
1	Dudu Georgescu	Dinamo București	33
2	Anghel Iordănescu	Steaua București	19
2	Ion Mureșan	ASA Târgu Mureș	19
2	Ion Oblemenco	Universitatea Craiova	19
5	Mihai Dănilă	Politehnica Iași	16

== Champion squad ==
Dinamo București

Goalkeepers: Mircea Constantinescu (32 / 0); Constantin Ștefan (2 / 0); Iosif Cavai (2 / 0).
Defenders: Florin Cheran (31 / 0); Vasile Dobrău (32 / 0); Alexandru Sătmăreanu (29 / 3); Augustin Deleanu (33 / 0); Gabriel Sandu (25 / 2); Teodor Lucuță (3 / 0).
Midfielders: Cornel Dinu (30 / 3); Radu Nunweiller (29 / 2); Viorel Sălceanu (5 / 1); Marin Ion (6 / 0); George Marincel (1 / 0); Marian Vlad (1 / 0).
Forwards: Alexandru Custov (31 / 2); Alexandru Moldovan (11 / 0); Dudu Georgescu (31 / 33); Florea Dumitrache (10 / 4); Toma Zamfir (31 / 8); Mircea Lucescu (31 / 4); Cristian Vrînceanu (8 / 0); Ionel Augustin (5 / 0).
(league appearances and goals listed in brackets)

Manager: Nicolae Dumitru.

== Attendances ==
#	Club	Average
1	Craiova	24,765
2	Timișoara	21,588
3	Galați	16,412
4	Steaua	14,353
5	Dinamo 1948	14,294
6	Satu Mare	13,529
7	Reșița	12,765
8	UTA Arad	12,000
9	Râmnicu Vâlcea	11,941
10	Târgu Mureș	11,706
11	Constanța	10,824
12	Iași	10,529
13	Argeș	9,206
14	Brașov	8,765
15	CFR Cluj	8,353
16	U Cluj	7,294
17	Sportul Studențesc	7,024
18	Jiul	5,559

== See also ==
- 1974–75 Divizia B
- 1974–75 Divizia C
- 1974–75 County Championship
- 1974–75 Cupa României
