= Ion Mateescu =

Romanian footballer

Personal information
- Date of birth: 25 November 1952
- Place of birth: Gârbov, Romania
- Date of death: 30 September 2017 (aged 64)
- Place of death: Bucharest, Romania
- Positions: Left back; midfielder

Youth career
- 1969–1970: Metalul București

Senior career*
Years	Team	Apps	(Gls)
1970–1971	Metalurgistul Cugir	27	(2)
1971–1972	Metalul București	29	(0)
1972–1975	Steagul Roșu Brașov	58	(11)
1975–1976	Dinamo București	21	(0)
1976–1977	FC Constanța	18	(1)
1977	Dinamo București	10	(1)
1978–1979	Autobuzul București		
1979–1980	Rapid București		
1980–1983	Progresul Vulcan București (Note: The statistics for the 1982–83 Divizia B season are unavailable.)	51	(1)
1983–1984	Metalurgistul Cugir		
1985–1986	Flacăra Moreni (Note: The statistics for the 1984–85 and 1985–86 Divizia B seasons are unavailable.)	8	(1)
1987	Mureșul Deva		
Total		222	(17)

International career
1975	Romania (Note: Including one appearance for Romania's Olympic team.)	2	(0)
- * Club domestic league appearances and goals

Ion Mateescu (25 November 1952 – 30 September 2017) was a Romanian footballer who played as a left defender and midfielder.

== International career ==
Ion Mateescu played one game at international level for Romania, in a friendly which ended 2–2 against the Soviet Union. He also played one game for Romania's Olympic team against France which ended with a 4–0 loss at the 1976 Summer Olympics qualifiers.

== Honours ==
Flacăra Moreni

- Divizia B: 1985–86
