= 1978 FIFA World Cup qualification – UEFA Group 8 =

Football tournament qualification stage

Group 8 consisted of three of the 32 teams entered into the European zone: Romania, Spain, and Yugoslavia. These three teams competed on a home-and-away basis for one of the 8.5 spots in the final tournament allocated to the European zone. The spot would be assigned to the group's winner.

== Standings ==
Pos	Team	Pld	W	D	L	GF	GA	GD	Pts
1	Spain	4	3	0	1	4	1	+3	6
2	Romania	4	2	0	2	7	8	−1	4
3	Yugoslavia	4	1	0	3	6	8	−2	2

== Matches ==
10 October 1976

Spain	1 – 0	Yugoslavia
Pirri 86' (pen.)	Report

Referee: Palotai (Hungary)

16 April 1977

Romania	1 – 0	Spain
Benito 5' (o.g.)	Report

Referee: Gordon (Scotland)

8 May 1977

Yugoslavia	0 – 2	Romania
	Report	D. Georgescu 37'; Iordănescu 44'

Referee: Ashkenazi (Israel)

26 October 1977

Spain	2 – 0	Romania
Leal 75'; Cano 83'	Report

Referee: Wurtz (France)

13 November 1977

Romania	4 – 6	Yugoslavia
Vigu 2'; Iordănescu 40'; Bölöni 43'; Georgescu 67'	Report	Sušić 14', 51', 62'; Mužinić 18'; Trifunović 79'; Filipović 84'

Referee: Delcourt (Belgium)

30 November 1977

Yugoslavia	0 – 1	Spain
	Report	Cano 71'

Referee: Burns (England)
