= Vasile Chitaru =

Romanian footballer (1959–2003)

Personal information
- Date of birth: 5 January 1959
- Place of birth: Bacău, Romania
- Date of death: 5 December 2003 (aged 44)
- Place of death: Bacău, Romania
- Position: Forward

Youth career
- SC Bacău

Senior career*
Years	Team	Apps	(Gls)
1974–1976	SC Bacău		
1976–1977	Dinamo București	7	(0)
1977–1983	SC Bacău		
1983–1984	Partizanul Bacău		
1984–1985	Foresta Fălticeni		
1985–1986	Proletarul Bacău		

International career
1974–1975	Romania U18	2	(1)
1974–1975	Romania U21	7	(0)
- * Club domestic league appearances and goals

Vasile Chitaru (5 January 1959 – 5 December 2003) was a Romanian footballer who played as a forward.

== Club career ==
Chitaru, nicknamed "Zira", was born on 5 January 1959 in Bacău, Romania. He made his Divizia A debut on 19 May 1974, playing for SC Bacău at the age of 15 years, 4 months and 14 days under coach Constantin Rădulescu in a 3–0 home victory against Jiul Petroșani. In 1976, Chitaru went to play for Dinamo București, where he won the league title in his only season spent at the club, coach Ion Nunweiller using him in seven matches. With Dinamo, he also played his only game in a European competition, a 0–0 draw against AC Milan in the first round of the 1976–77 UEFA Cup. Afterwards, he returned to play for SC Bacău for a few years. He spent the last three years of his career at Partizanul Bacău, Foresta Fălticeni and Proletarul Bacău, retiring in 1986.

== International career ==
Between 1974 and 1975, Chitaru made several appearances for Romania's under-18 and under-21 national teams.

== Death ==
Throughout his life, Chitaru struggled with alcoholism, committing suicide in December 2003 by jumping from his apartment balcony which was on the fourth floor.

== Honours ==
SC Bacău

- Divizia B: 1974–75

Dinamo București

- Divizia A: 1976–77
