= Toma Zamfir =

Romanian footballer

Personal information
- Date of birth: 9 March 1954
- Place of birth: Popești-Leordeni, Romania
- Date of death: 12 July 2015 (aged 61)
- Positions: Forward; midfielder

Youth career
- Vâscoza București

Senior career*
Years	Team	Apps	(Gls)
1973–1974	Dinamo Slatina	34	(18)
1974–1976	Dinamo București	45	(13)
1976–1977	SC Bacău	17	(2)
1977–1978	Dinamo București	1	(0)
1978–1985	Autobuzul București		
Total		97	(33)

International career
1976	Romania U23	3	(1)
1976	Romania B	1	(1)
- * Club domestic league appearances and goals

Toma Zamfir (9 March 1954 – 12 July 2015) was a Romanian footballer who played as a forward.

== Club career ==
Zamfir, nicknamed "Bulgarul" (The Bulgarian), was born on 9 March 1954 in Popești-Leordeni, Romania. He began playing football at Vâscoza București under coach Iosif Ungureanu. In 1973, coach Constantin Ștefan brought him to Dinamo Slatina where he scored 18 goals during the 1973–74 Divizia B season. Subsequently, he joined Dinamo București, making his Divizia A debut on 11 August 1974 under coach Nicolae Dumitru in a 2–1 home victory against FCM Reșița. Zamfir scored his first goal in the competition on 25 August in a 2–0 win over rivals Steaua București. He finished the season by netting eight in the 31 league matches under Dumitru, helping the team win the title. During the same season he played three matches in the 1974–75 UEFA Cup, helping The Red Dogs eliminate Boluspor in the first round, being defeated in the following one by FC Köln. In 1976, Zamfir went to play for one season at SC Bacău. Afterwards, he came back to Dinamo where he made his last Divizia A appearance on 16 November 1977 in a 1–0 home win over FCM Reșița, totaling 63 matches with 15 goals in the competition. In 1978, Zamfir went to play for Autobuzul București in Divizia B, where he ended his career in 1985.

== International career ==
In 1976, Zamfir made three appearances for Romania's under-23 national team and scored one goal in a 1–1 draw against Bulgaria. In the same year, he played one match for Romania's B team, a 2–1 loss to Poland where he scored his side's only goal.

== Death ==
Zamfir died on 12 July 2015 at the age of 61.

== Honours ==
Dinamo București

- Divizia A: 1974–75
