= Constantin Eftimescu =

Romanian footballer (1952–2022)

Personal information
- Date of birth: 15 June 1952
- Place of birth: Bucharest, Romania
- Date of death: 18 June 2022 (aged 70)
- Place of death: Bucharest, Romania
- Position: Goalkeeper

Youth career
- Dinamo Obor București
- 1964–1970: Steaua București
- 1971–1972: Dinamo București

Senior career*
Years	Team	Apps	(Gls)
1972–1973	Dinamo București	1	(0)
1973–1976	Dinamo Slatina (Note: The statistics for the 1974–75 and 1975–76 Divizia B seasons are unavailable.)	19	(0)
1976–1984	Dinamo București	81	(0)
1984–1986	Victoria București	17	(0)
1986–1987	Delta Dinamo Tulcea		
1988	CS Târgoviște		
1988–1989	Chimia Râmnicu Vâlcea		
Total		118	(0)
- * Club domestic league appearances and goals

Constantin Eftimescu (15 June 1952 – 18 June 2022) was a Romanian footballer who played as a goalkeeper.

== Career ==
Eftimescu was born on 15 June 1952 in București, Romania and grew up in the Rahova neighborhood. He began playing junior-level football at Dinamo Obor București. In 1964, Eftimescu moved to Steaua București where he stayed until 1970 when he joined Dinamo București. There, he made his Divizia A debut on 15 October 1972, keeping a clean sheet under coach Ion Nunweiller in a 1–0 home win over FC Brașov. That was his single appearance of the season, as the club won the title. Subsequently, from 1973 to 1976 he played for Dinamo Slatina in Divizia B.

In 1976, Eftimescu made a comeback to Dinamo București where in the 1976–77 season, he played three games under coach Nunweiller as the team won the championship. Afterwards, he played in both legs of the 12–0 aggregate win over Alki Larnaca in the first round of the 1979–80 UEFA Cup. Eftimescu won three consecutive Divizia A titles from 1982 to 1984. In the first one, he played six matches under coach Valentin Stănescu. In the second, he played six games once again and in the third he made four appearances, working with coach Nicolae Dumitru for both. Eftimescu also won two Cupa României with The Red Dogs, but he did not play in either of the finals. He replaced Dumitru Moraru for the last minutes of the 3–0 home victory against Kuusysi Lahti in the first round of the 1983–84 European Cup, a campaign in which Dinamo reached the semi-finals.

In 1984, Eftimescu joined Divizia B club Victoria București, which he helped—alongside coach Florin Cheran—to earn first-league promotion after one year. On 19 April 1986, he made his last Divizia A appearance in a 1–0 loss to Universitatea Cluj, totaling 90 matches with 83 goals conceded in the competition. Eftimescu retired in 1989 after spending the last years of his career playing for Delta Dinamo Tulcea, CS Târgoviște and Chimia Râmnicu Vâlcea in Divizia B.

== After retirement and death ==
After Eftimescu ended his playing career, he worked as a competition organizer and president of Dinamo București.

He was hospitalized in the Intensive Care Unit at the Military Hospital in Bucharest and died on 18 June 2022 at the age of 70.

== Honours ==
Dinamo București

- Divizia A: 1972–73, 1976–77, 1981–82, 1982–83, 1983–84
- Cupa României: 1981–82, 1983–84

Victoria București

- Divizia B: 1984–85
