= Cristian Vrînceanu =

Romanian footballer

Personal information
- Date of birth: 15 April 1956 (age 70)
- Place of birth: Bucharest, Romania
- Positions: Striker; midfielder

Senior career*
Years	Team	Apps	(Gls)
1973–1981	Dinamo București	148	(11)
1982	Corvinul Hunedoara	5	(1)
1983–1984	Buffalo Stallions (indoor)	2	(1)
1985–1986	New York Croatia		
Total		155	(13)

International career
1975–1977	Romania U21	13	(1)
1975	Romania U23	1	(0)
- * Club domestic league appearances and goals

Cristian Vrînceanu (born 15 April 1956), commonly known as Chris Vranceanu, is a Romanian former football striker.

== Club career ==
Vrînceanu was born on 15 April 1956 in Bucharest, Romania. He began playing senior-level football at Dinamo București, making his Divizia A debut on 19 August 1973, when coach Ion Nunweiller sent him in the 65th minute to replace Viorel Sălceanu in a 5–1 home victory against ASA Târgu Mureș. Over the course of eight seasons spent with The Red Dogs, Vrînceanu won two Divizia A titles. In the first title-winning season he was used by coach Nicolae Dumitru in eight games. In the second, Ion Nunweiller sent him on the field 25 times. Subsequently, he netted a career-best five goals in the 1977–78 season, including scoring once in a 3–3 draw against rivals Steaua București. During his time with Dinamo, Vrînceanu also played 10 games and scored four goals in European competitions, including netting three times in a 12–0 aggregate win over Alki Larnaca in the first round of the 1979–80 UEFA Cup. He played in victories against each of the Madrid giants Real and Atlético—scoring once in a 2–1 win against the latter—in the European Cup, but on both occasions, Dinamo failed to advance past the Spanish sides. His tenure at Dinamo saw him play alongside famous players of Romanian football such as Florea Dumitrache, Cornel Dinu, Dudu Georgescu, Mircea Lucescu, Augustin Deleanu and Radu Nunweiller.

In 1982, Vrînceanu moved to Corvinul Hunedoara. On 11 September 1982, he made his last Divizia A appearance and scored a goal in a 2–1 home win over CS Târgoviște, totaling 153 matches with 12 goals in the competition. Four days later, Vrînceanu played in Corvinul's 1–1 away draw against Grazer AK in the first round of the 1982–83 UEFA Cup, after which he defected from Nicolae Ceaușescu's communist regime to Austria. In 1983, he moved to the United States and played indoor football for the Buffalo Stallions. Afterwards, he returned to regular football, playing alongside compatriot Marius Ciugarin for New York Croatia, helping the team win the 1985–86 Cosmopolitan Soccer League. After finishing his playing career in the United States, he moved to Guaxupé, Brazil.

== International career ==
From 1975 to 1977, Vrînceanu played 13 matches and scored once for Romania's under-21 side, while also making an appearance for the country's under-23 team.

== Honours ==
Dinamo București

- Divizia A: 1974–75, 1976–77

New York Croatia

- Cosmopolitan Soccer League: 1985–86
