= Marin Ion =

Romanian footballer and manager

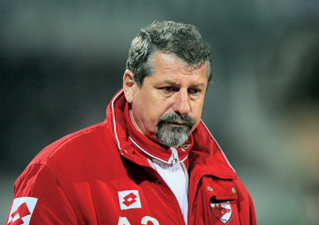

Personal information
- Date of birth: 25 March 1955 (age 71)
- Place of birth: Ciorogârla, Romania
- Height: 1.87 m (6 ft 2 in)
- Position: Centre-back

Team information
- Current team: Romania U19 (head coach)

Youth career
- 1971–1972: Rapid București
- 1972–1973: Dinamo București

Senior career*
Years	Team	Apps	(Gls)
1973–1984	Dinamo București	249	(5)
1985	Bihor Oradea	28	(1)
1986	Victoria București	13	(0)
1986–1987	Rapid București	26	(1)
1988–1989	Pandurii Târgu Jiu		
Total		316	(7)

International career
1975–1978	Romania U21	7	(0)
1976	Romania U23	2	(0)

Managerial career
- 1989: Pandurii Târgu Jiu
- 1990–1991: Dinamo București (assistant)
- 1991–1992: Flacăra Moreni
- 1992–1996: Petrolul Ploiești
- 1996–1997: Farul Constanța
- 1998–1999: Petrolul Ploiești
- 2000–2001: Astra Ploiești
- 2001–2002: Dinamo București
- 2002: Bihor Oradea
- 2003–2004: Farul Constanța
- 2004–2005: Universitatea Cluj
- 2005: Bihor Oradea
- 2006: Dinamo București
- 2006: Farul Constanța
- 2007: Farul Constanța (caretaker)
- 2007–2009: Farul Constanța
- 2009: Dinamo București (assistant)
- 2009: Dinamo București (caretaker)
- 2009–2011: Al-Ettifaq
- 2011: Dubai Club
- 2012: Dinamo II București
- 2012–2014: Kuwait SC
- 2014–2015: Al Dhafra
- 2015: Dubai Club
- 2015–2016: Zakho
- 2016–2017: Al-Mina'a
- 2018–2019: Qadsia
- 2021–2022: Romania women U19
- 2022–2023: Romania U17
- 2023–2024: Romania U18
- 2024–2025: Romania U19
- 2025–2026: Romania U18
- 2026–: Romania U19
- * Club domestic league appearances and goals

Marin Ion (born 25 March 1955) is a Romanian professional football coach and a former player, currently the head coach of the Romania national under-19 team.

== Club career ==
Ion was born on 25 March 1955 in Ciorogârla, Romania. He began playing junior-level football for the club from his local town, alongside his brother Hristache. In 1971, he joined Rapid București's junior center, one year later moving to Dinamo București. While training with Dinamo's senior squad, Ion was nicknamed "Săpăligă" (the Romanian word for a small agricultural hoe) by Lică Nunweiller after a rough tackle.

Ion made his Divizia A debut on 5 April 1975 at age 20, as coach Nicolae Dumitru sent him in the 70th minute to replace Gabriel Sandu in a 2–2 draw against Argeș Pitești. His performance in that match was well-received in the press, with journalist Gheorghe Nicolaescu giving him a grade 7 in the Sportul newspaper and praising his performance. Ion made six appearances until the end of that season, as Dinamo won the title. He repeated the performance in the 1976–77 season, this time playing 21 matches and scoring once under coach Ion Nunweiller. From 1982 to 1984, Ion earned three consecutive Divizia A titles. In the first one, coach Valentin Stănescu gave him 30 appearances. In the following two, he worked again with Dumitru and played 29 matches in the first season and 28 in the second. Ion also won two Cupa României with Dinamo. He played the full 90 minutes under Stănescu in the 3–2 win over FC Baia Mare in the 1982 final and in the 1984 final he played the entire match under Dumitru in the 2–1 victory against rivals Steaua București. Ion played a total of 30 games in European competitions for The Red Dogs, making some notable performances such as helping the club eliminate Inter Milan in the 1981–82 UEFA Cup. He appeared in eight games in the 1983–84 European Cup, as the club eliminated title holders Hamburg in the campaign, reaching the semi-finals where they were defeated by Liverpool.

In the middle of the 1984–85 season, Ion was transferred from Dinamo to Bihor Oradea in exchange for Ion Adrian Zare. One year later, he switched teams again, going to Victoria București. Subsequently, Ion went to Rapid for the 1986–87 season, during which he made his last Divizia A appearance on 13 May 1987 in a 1–0 win over Oțelul Galați, totaling 316 matches with seven goals in the competition. He ended his career after playing a few matches for Pandurii Târgu Jiu in Divizia B.

== International career ==
From 1975 to 1978, Ion made several appearances for Romania's under-21 and under-23 teams. However, he never played for Romania's senior team and on 13 May 2020, Gazeta Sporturilor included him in a first XI of best Romanian players who never played for the senior national team.

== Managerial career ==
Ion began his managerial career at Pandurii Târgu Jiu in 1989. In the 1990–91 season, he served as an assistant coach for Gheorghe Mulțescu and then for Florin Halagian at Dinamo București. Subsequently, he worked for Flacăra Moreni as head coach. From 1992 to 1996, Ion led Petrolul Ploiești, helping them win the 1994–95 Cupa României by defeating Rapid București in the final. In the following years, he coached Farul Constanța, Petrolul once again and Astra Ploiești. Afterwards, he was coach at Dinamo, managing to win the 2001–02 Divizia A title. However, with a few rounds before the end of the season, the club's officials insisted that Cornel Dinu be a part of the coaching staff.

Between 2002 and 2005, Ion oscillated between the Romanian first and second leagues, including two tenures at Bihor Oradea and a stint at Universitatea Cluj—both in Divizia B—while also guiding Divizia A club Farul for one and a half seasons. In 2006, he coached Dinamo for a short while, following Esteban Vigo's departure. From 2006 to 2009, he had several spells at Farul. In July 2007, Ion went to Nigeria to observe a trial from which he selected four players, including Kehinde Fatai. Because the players were minors, he had to become their parent in order to transfer them to Farul. In August 2009, Ion became Dario Bonetti's assistant at Dinamo. Two months later, after Bonetti's departure, he was the club's caretaker manager.

Ion left Dinamo at the end of October 2009 to join Saudi Pro League club Al-Ettifaq. The team was in last place, but he managed to help them avoid relegation. He was dismissed by Al-Ettifaq in March 2011. Subsequently, Ion coached Dubai Club where in his first game, that occurred in the 2011–12 UAE League Cup, his side defeated Al Wasl 5–0, which was managed by Diego Maradona. After the match, Maradona told him: "You're great!". In 2012, he came back to Romania, coaching Dinamo's satellite team for seven months. In July 2012, Ion was hired as manager by Kuwait SC and during his first season in charge, he won the Kuwaiti Premier League title undefeated and the AFC Cup after defeating Arbil 4–0 in the final. In 2013, he was named Kuwaiti Coach of the Year after winning his second AFC Cup title, this time earning a 2–0 victory against Qadsia in the final. In April 2014, Ion stepped down as head coach of Kuwait SC, but the team still managed to win the 2013–14 Kuwait Emir Cup. On 30 September 2014, he became the head coach of the United Arab Emirates club Al Dhafra. In January 2015 he parted ways with the club. Afterwards, in April 2015 he returned for a short spell at Dubai Club. In April 2016, he was appointed manager of Iraqi side Zakho, replacing Ilie Stan and having compatriot Mihai Leca as one of his players. In 2016, Ion was hired by Iraqi club Al-Mina'a, but stepped down in April 2017. In May 2018, he moved back to Kuwait to coach Qadsia. His first trophy won there was the 2018 Kuwait Super Cup, achieved by defeating Kuwait SC 2–1, his former team. Subsequently, the club won the 2018–19 Kuwait Federation Cup, after a penalty shoot-out victory over Al-Shabab in the final.

In February 2021, Ion was appointed to coach Romania's women under-19 national team. In 2022, he returned to men's football, successively coaching Romania's under-17, under-18 and under-19 national teams. With the under-19 side, he reached the semi-finals of the 2025 European Championship where they were defeated by the Netherlands.

== Honours ==
=== Player ===
Dinamo București

- Divizia A: 1974–75, 1976–77, 1981–82, 1982–83, 1983–84
- Cupa României: 1981–82, 1983–84

=== Manager ===
Petrolul Ploiești

- Cupa României: 1994–95

Dinamo București

- Divizia A: 2001–02

Kuwait SC

- Kuwaiti Premier League: 2012–13
- AFC Cup: 2012, 2013

Qadsia

- Kuwait Super Cup: 2018
- Kuwait Federation Cup: 2018–19

Individual

- Kuwait Manager of the Year: 2013
