= Alexandru Custov =

Romanian footballer (1954-2008)

Personal information
- Date of birth: 8 May 1954
- Place of birth: Fundeni, Romania
- Date of death: 19 March 2008 (aged 53)
- Place of death: Fundeni, Romania
- Position: Midfielder

Youth career
- 1968–1969: Gloria Fundeni
- 1969–1972: Dinamo București

Senior career*
Years	Team	Apps	(Gls)
1972–1984	Dinamo București	319	(29)
1984–1986	Victoria București (Note: The statistics for the 1984–85 Divizia B season are unavailable.)	7	(0)
1986–1987	Gloria Buzău		
1987	Mecanica Fină București		
Total		326	(29)

International career^{‡}
1982	Romania	2	(0)
- * Club domestic league appearances and goals as of 30 June 2006 ‡ National team caps and goals as of 30 June 2006

Alexandru Custov (8 May 1954 – 20 March 2008) was a Romanian footballer who played as a midfielder.

== Club career ==
Custov was born on 8 May 1954 in Fundeni, Romania and began playing junior-level football in 1968 at local club Gloria. In 1969, he went to Dinamo București, making his Divizia A debut on 4 May 1972 under coach Nicolae Dumitru in a 0–0 draw against Farul Constanța. On 26 May 1974, he scored a goal in a 3–1 derby victory against Steaua București. In the 1974–75 season, Custov won his first title with the club, contributing under the guidance of coach Dumitru with 31 appearances and two goals scored. He repeated the performance in the 1976–77 season with coach Ion Nunweiller, this time playing 33 matches and scoring two goals. In his last three seasons spent with The Red Dogs, Custov won three consecutive Divizia A titles. In the first one, coach Valentin Stănescu gave him 31 appearances in which he scored six goals. In the following two he worked again with Dumitru and contributed with 28 matches played and two goals scored in each season. Custov also won two Cupa României with Dinamo. He played the full 90 minutes under Stănescu in the 3–2 win over FC Baia Mare in the 1982 final and in the 1984 final he scored a goal in the 2–1 victory against rivals Steaua, playing the entire match under Dumitru. Custov played a total of 30 games and scored three goals in European competitions for Dinamo. In the 1981–82 UEFA Cup he scored one goal at the San Siro stadium in a 1–1 draw against Inter Milan, which led to their elimination after a 3–2 victory in the second leg. He appeared in six games in the 1983–84 European Cup, as the club eliminated title holders Hamburg in the campaign, reaching the semi-finals where they were defeated by Liverpool.

In 1984, Custov joined Victoria București in Divizia B, and after one season, they secured promotion to the first league under coach Florin Cheran. On 10 May 1986, he made his last Divizia A appearance in a 1–0 win over ASA Târgu Mureș, totaling 326 matches with 29 goals in the competition. Custov spent the last years of his career playing for Gloria Buzău and Mecanica Fină București in Divizia B.

== International career ==
Custov played two games for Romania, making his debut on 18 July 1982 when coach Mircea Lucescu sent him in the 58th minute to replace Ilie Balaci in a 3–1 friendly victory against Japan. His second game was 2–0 win over Sweden in the Euro 1984 qualifiers in which he also came as a substitute, replacing Michael Klein in the 85th minute.

== Death ==
On 20 March 2008, Custov died at age 53 in his native Fundeni, after suffering from diabetes and thrombophlebitis.

== Honours ==
Dinamo București

- Divizia A: 1974–75, 1976–77, 1981–82, 1982–83, 1983–84
- Cupa României: 1981–82, 1983–84

Victoria București

- Divizia B: 1984–85
