= Alexandru Moldovan =

Romanian footballer

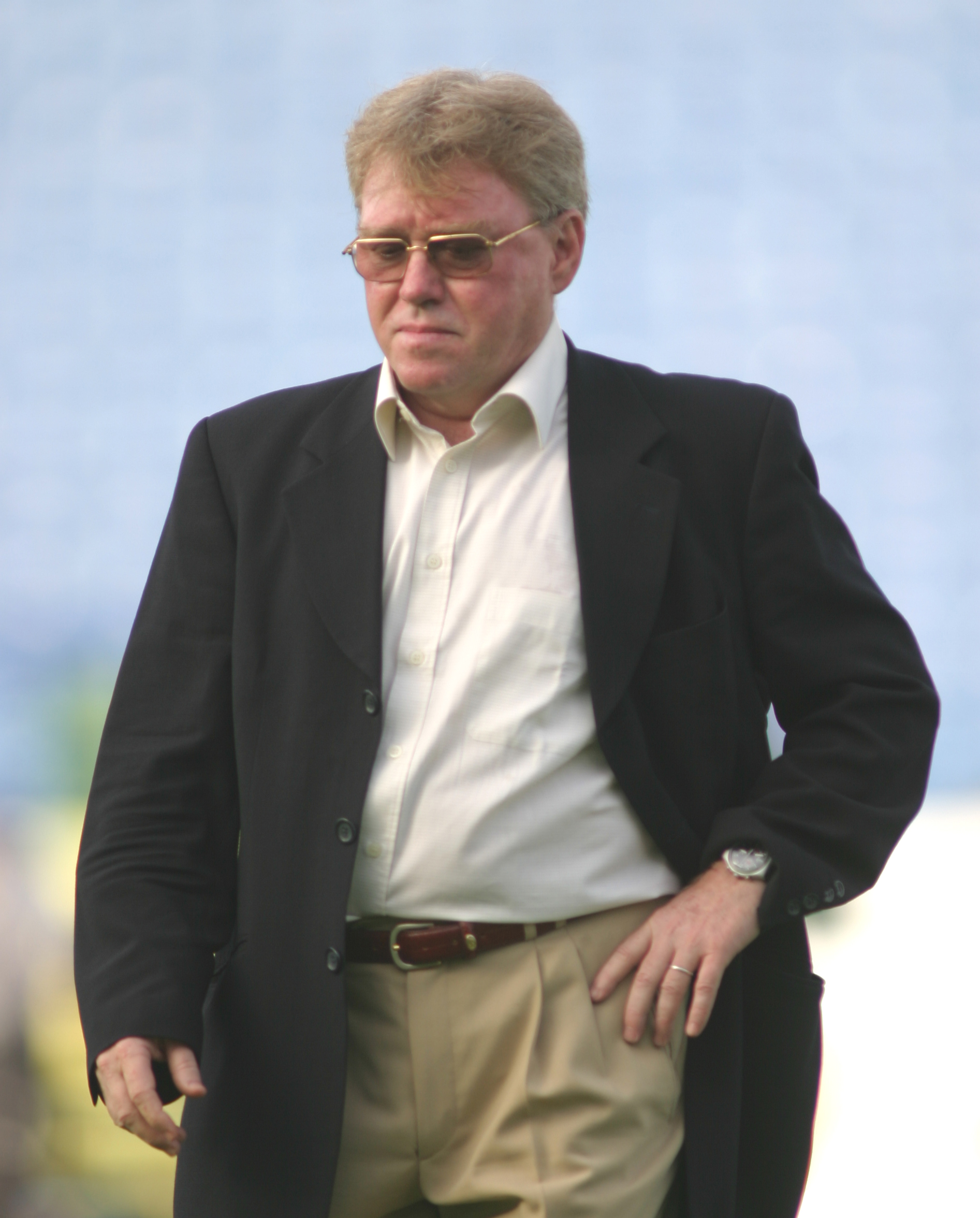
- Moldovan coach of Raja Casablanca in 2005.

Personal information
- Full name: Alexandru Moldovan
- Date of birth: 23 August 1950 (age 76)
- Place of birth: Ocna Mureș, Romania
- Position: Midfielder

Youth career
- 1964–1967: Soda Ocna Mureș
- 1967–1970: Dinamo București

Senior career*
Years	Team	Apps	(Gls)
1970–1978	Dinamo București	125	(8)
1971–1972	→ Crişul Oradea (loan)	13	(1)
1975–1976	→ Jiul Petroșani (loan)	29	(8)
1978–1980	Progresul București	24	(6)
1980–1982	Victoria București		
1982–1983	Metalurgistul Cugir		
1983–1985	Unirea Alba Iulia		

Managerial career
- 1986: Flacăra Moreni
- 1987–1989: Chimia Râmnicu Vâlcea
- 1989: FC Argeș Pitești
- 1990: Inter Sibiu
- 1991–1992: Unirea Alba Iulia
- 1992–1993: Dinamo București
- 1993: Al Qadsia
- 1993–1994: Stade Tunisien
- 1994–1995: Olympique Béja
- 1995: Club Athlétique Bizertin
- 1995–1996: Maghreb Fès
- 1996: Union Sidi Kacem
- 1996–1997: Raja Casablanca
- 1997–1998: Wydad Casablanca
- 1998: Al Salmiya
- 1998–1999: Al Jahra
- 1999: Bahrain
- 2000: FCM Onești
- 2000–2001: Raja Casablanca
- 2001–2002: Bihor Oradea
- 2002: Poiana Câmpina
- 2002–2003: Al Ta'ee
- 2003–2004: Al Jabalain
- 2004–2005: Olympique Béja
- 2005: Raja Casablanca
- 2006: Al Masry
- 2007: Inter Gaz București
- 2008: JS Kabylie
- 2009–2010: Al Tadamun
- * Club domestic league appearances and goals

Alexandru Moldovan (born 23 August 1950, in Ocna Mureș) is a Romanian football manager and former midfielder.

== Career ==
=== Playing career ===
Moldovan played for Dinamo Bucharest, Crişul Oradea, Jiul Petroșani, Progresul București, Victoria București, Metalurgistul Cugir and Unirea Alba Iulia from 1970 and 1985 until his retirement.

During his playing career Moldovan won four League titles in eight years with Dinamo Bucharest.

=== Coaching career ===
Moldovan coached a number of teams in his native Romania, including most notably Dinamo Bucharest in the 1992–93 season. His side lost 2–0 on aggregate to eventual winners Olympique de Marseille in the second round qualifiers for the group stage of the UEFA Champions League in 1993. In the same year he left Romania to coach clubs in Kuwait, Tunisia, Morocco, Algeria, Bahrain, Saudi Arabia and Egypt.

Moldovan had three successful spells as manager of Raja Casablanca. During his first era in charge, Raja won the Moroccan league title in 1997. In his second stint Raja had surprisingly sacked him in the 2001–02 season when they were seven points clear in the standings but officials felt the team were not playing attractive football and Raja ended up third after replacing him. During his third spell at the club Moldovan won the Coupe du Trône and led the Moroccan side to the semifinals of the CAF Champions League in 2005 losing 2–0 on aggregate against Tunisian side Étoile du Sahel. Moldovan was fired and replaced by Oscar Fulloné in December 2005.

== Honours ==
=== Club ===
Dinamo București

- Romanian League: 1970–71, 1972–73, 1974–75, 1976–77
- Romanian Cup Runner-up: 1970–71

Progresul București

- Romanian Second League: 1979–80

=== Manager ===
Olympique Béja

- Tunisian Super Cup: 1995
- Tunisian Cup Runner-up: 1994–95

Raja Casablanca

- Moroccan League: 1996–97
- Moroccan Cup: 2005

Al-Salmiya

- Kuwaiti Premier League: 1998
