= Constantin Ștefan (footballer, born 1951) =

Romanian footballer

Personal information
- Full name: Constantin Traian Ștefan
- Date of birth: 8 January 1951 (age 75)
- Place of birth: Brașov, Romania
- Height: 1.89 m (6 ft 2 in)
- Position: Goalkeeper

Youth career
- 1965–1969: Universitatea Cluj

Senior career*
Years	Team	Apps	(Gls)
1968–1974	Universitatea Cluj	85	(0)
1974–1980	Dinamo București	101	(0)
1981–1982	Rapid București		
1982–1984	Dinamo Victoria București		
Total		186	(0)

International career
1979	Romania	1	(0)
- * Club domestic league appearances and goals as of 24 January 2020

Constantin Traian Ștefan (born 8 January 1951) is a Romanian former footballer who played as a goalkeeper.

== Club career ==
Ștefan was born on 3 January 1951 in Brașov, Romania. At age 14, he began playing junior-level football at Universitatea Cluj, winning the national junior title in 1969. He made his Divizia A debut on 23 September 1968 when coach Constantin Teașcă sent him in the 88th minute to replace Cristian Ringheanu in Universitatea's 3–0 win over Argeș Pitești. The highlight of his six-season spell with "U" Cluj was a third place in the 1971–72 season. Subsequently, he appeared in both legs of the 6–5 aggregate loss to Levski Sofia in the first round of the 1972–73 UEFA Cup.

In 1974, Ștefan joined Dinamo București where in his first season he won the title under coach Nicolae Dumitru, making only two appearances as the team's first choice goalkeeper was Mircea Constantinescu. He won another title in the 1976–77 season, this time making 31 appearances under coach Ion Nunweiller. During his six seasons spent with The Red Dogs, he played seven games in European competitions, including a clean sheet in a 1–0 victory against Real Madrid in the 1975–76 European Cup. He made his last Divizia A appearance on 26 April 1980 in Dinamo's 2–0 away loss to Dunărea Galați, totaling 186 matches in the competition. Ștefan ended his career by playing three seasons in Divizia B, one at Rapid București and the last two for Dinamo Victoria București.

== International career ==
Ștefan played one friendly game for Romania under coach Ștefan Kovács which ended with a 1–0 loss to East Germany at Stadion der Weltjugend in Berlin.

== Personal life ==
After ending his football career, Ștefan worked as a mathematics teacher.

== Honours ==
Dinamo București

- Divizia A: 1974–75, 1976–77
