= Radu Nunweiller =

Romanian footballer and manager

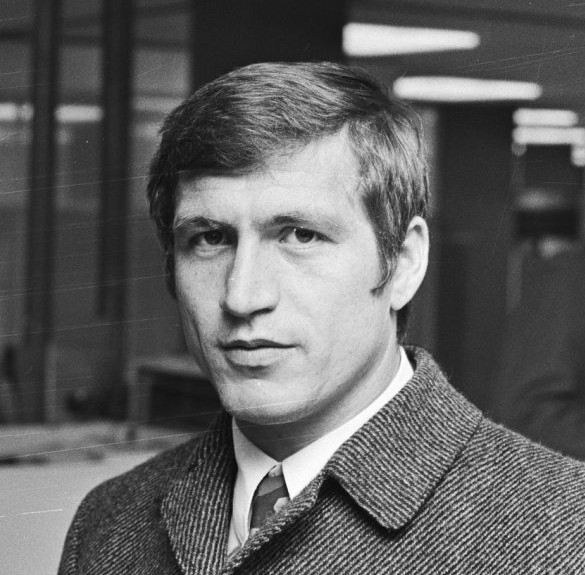
- Nunweiller in 1970

Personal information
- Full name: Radu Nunweiller
- Date of birth: 16 November 1944 (age 81)
- Place of birth: Bucharest, Romania
- Height: 1.80 m (5 ft 11 in)
- Position: Central midfielder

Youth career
- 1957–1962: Tânarul Dinamovist

Senior career*
Years	Team	Apps	(Gls)
1962–1963	Viitorul București	1	(0)
1963–1976	Dinamo București	295	(38)
1976–1979	Corvinul Hunedoara	37	(2)
Total		333	(40)

International career
1962	Romania U18		
1966–1975	Romania (Note: Including one appearance for Romania's Olympic team.)	42	(2)

Managerial career
- 1981–1984: Martigny-Sports
- 1984–1987: Lausanne-Sport
- 1987–1988: Martigny-Sports
- 1989–1990: Etoile Carouge
- 1990–1995: Chênois
- 1995–1996: Servette Geneva (assistant)
- 1996–2001: Lausanne-Sport (assistant)
- 2001–2002: Lausanne-Sport
- 2003: UTA Arad
- 2004–2005: Yverdon-Sport
- 2009–2010: Neuchâtel Xamax (assistant)
- 2010: Neuchâtel Xamax (caretaker)
- * Club domestic league appearances and goals

Radu Nunweiller (born 16 November 1944) is a former Romanian central midfield football player and manager.

== Club career ==
=== Early career ===
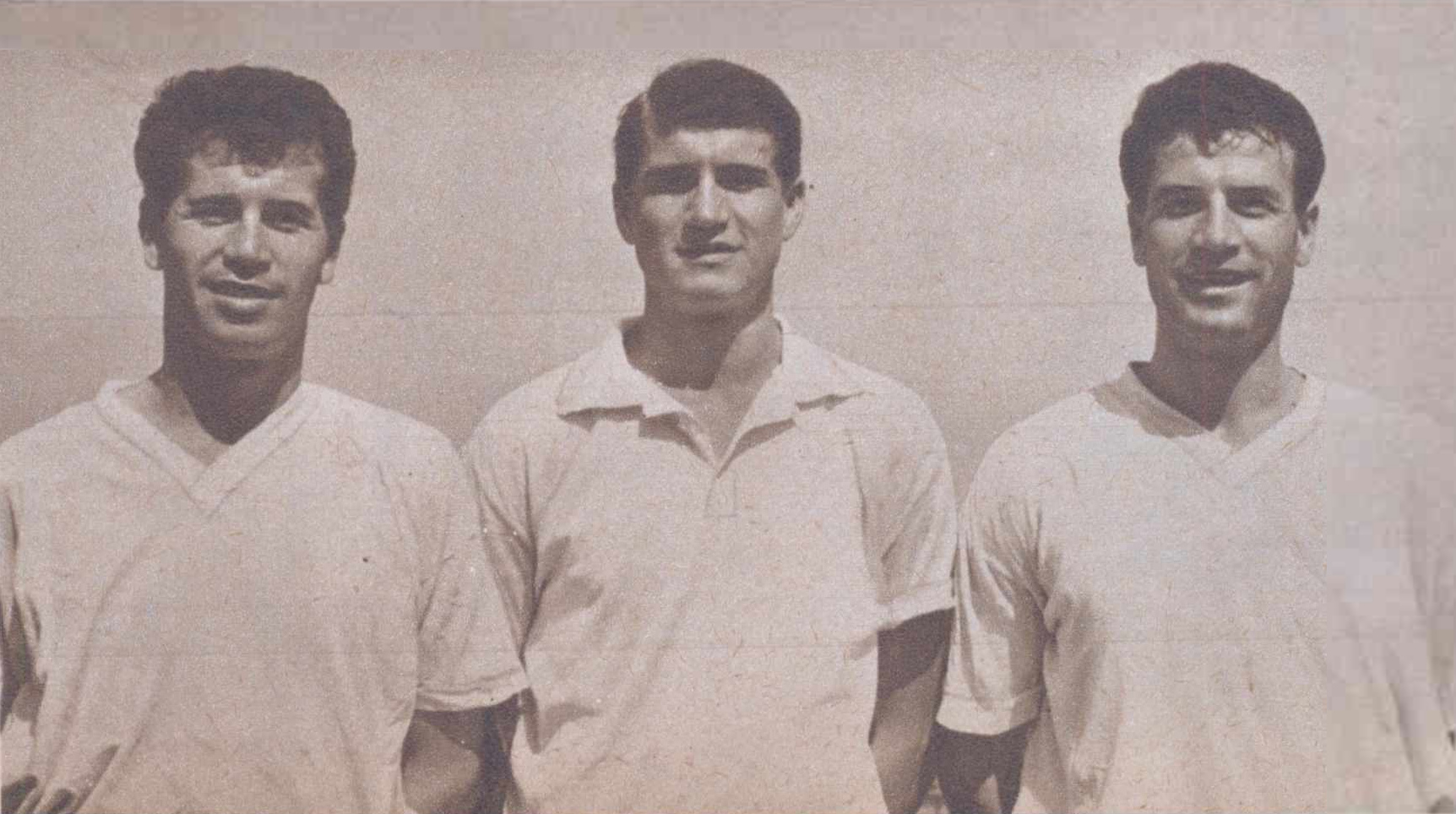
The Nunweiller brothers (left to right): Lică, Radu and Ion

Nunweiller was born on 16 November 1944 in Bucharest, Romania. He had an Austrian father named Johann Nunweiller, who settled in Piatra Neamț after World War I where he met his wife, Rozina, and later they moved to Bucharest. He had six brothers: Constantin, the oldest, was a water polo player, while Dumitru, Ion, Lică, Victor, and Eduard were all footballers who each played at least one spell at Dinamo București. They are the reason why the club's nickname is "The Red Dogs" as especially Ion and Lică were known for their aggressiveness on the field, which often caused their faces to turn red from the effort. Nunweiller made his Divizia A debut, playing for Viitorul București on 21 October 1962 under coach Gheorghe Ola in a 4–2 loss to Steaua București.

=== Dinamo București ===
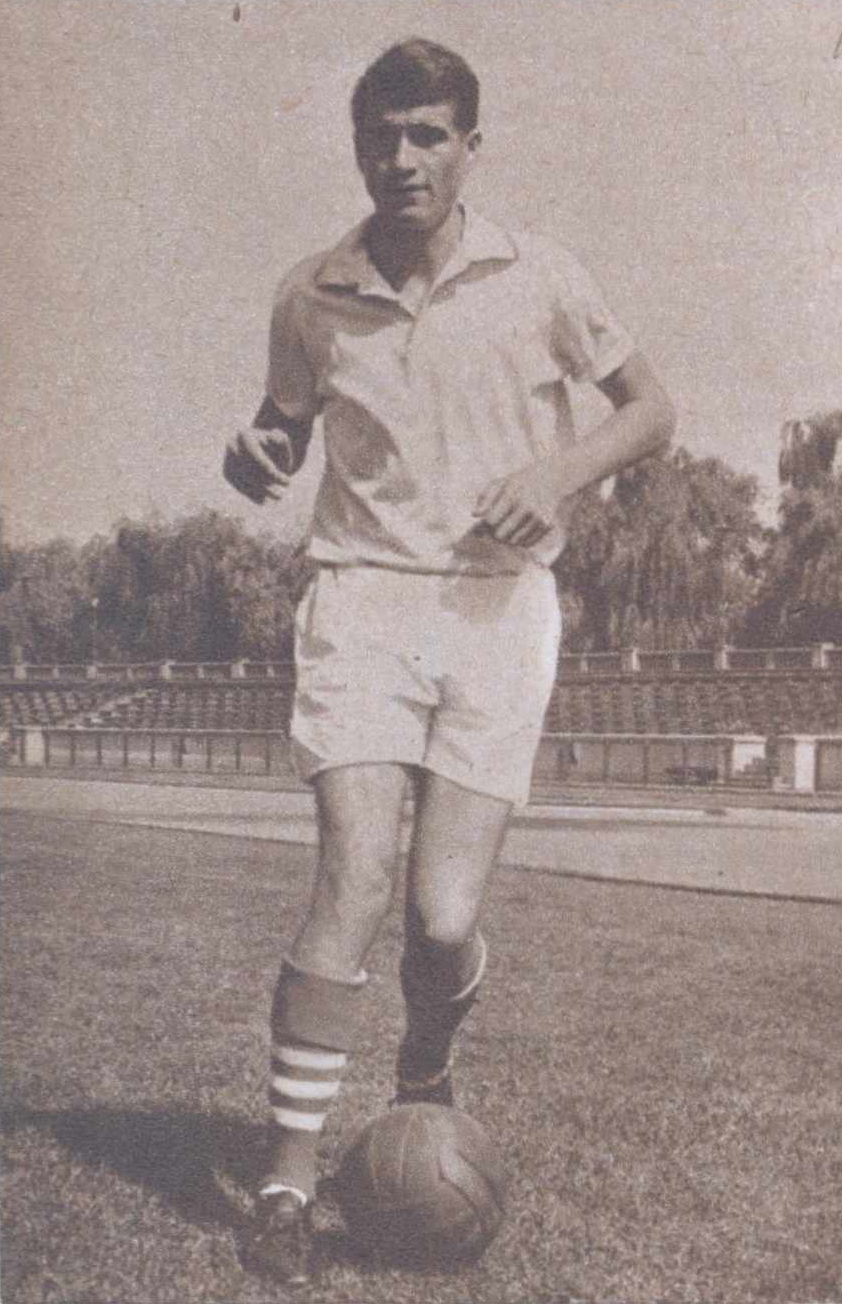
Radu Nunweiller in 1963

After playing only one league match for Viitorul, Nunweiller went to play for Dinamo București where in his first two seasons he won two titles. In the first he worked with coaches Traian Ionescu and Nicolae Dumitru who gave him five appearances in which he netted two goals. In the second one he played 18 games, scoring once under the guidance of Angelo Niculescu. At the conquest of these titles he was teammates with his brothers Ion and Lică. Nunweiller also won the 1963–64 Cupa României with The Red Dogs, coach Ionescu using him and his brothers Ion and Lică for the full 90 minutes in the 5–3 victory over rivals Steaua București in the final in which he scored a goal. He would score two more goals against Steaua in two victories, a 3–0 and a 1–0. For the way he played in 1969, Nunweiller was placed third in the ranking for the Romanian Footballer of the Year award, and in the following year, he was in fourth place. In the 1970–71 season he won another championship, playing alongside his brother Ion, as coaches Dumitru and Ionescu used him in 30 games in which he netted five times. In 1972, Ion became head coach of Dinamo, and Nunweiller managed to win the title with him in the 1972–73 season by contributing with a career-best seven goals in 30 games. They would also win the 1974–75 title together, but this time Ion was the assistant coach of Nicolae Dumitru who gave Nunweiller 29 appearances in which he scored twice. He appeared in 23 matches in which he scored seven goals in European competitions for Dinamo, including netting four in a 11–0 win over Crusaders in the 1973–74 European Cup. In the 1975–76 edition he played in a 1–0 victory against Real Madrid.

=== Corvinul Hunedoara ===
Nunweiller ended his career after playing three seasons for Corvinul Hunedoara. He made his last Divizia A appearance on 11 September 1978 in a 1–0 home loss to FC Baia Mare, totaling 333 appearances and 40 goals in the competition.

== International career ==
"When I decide which team will play, I first put the name of Radu Nunweiller next to the number 10 jersey and then I look for ten more players."

— Angelo Niculescu, former Romania manager

Under the guidance of coaches Nicolae Dumitrescu and Gheorghe Ola, Nunweiller helped Romania's under-18 national team win the 1962 European championship.

Nunweiller played 41 matches and scored two goals for Romania (42/2 including Romania's Olympic team games), making his debut on 21 September 1966 under coach Ilie Oană in a 2–0 friendly loss to East Germany. His following game was a 1–0 loss to Italy in the 1968 Euro qualifiers. Then he played three games during the successful 1970 World Cup qualifiers. Subsequently, coach Angelo Niculescu used him for the entirety of all three games in the final tournament which were a win against Czechoslovakia and losses to England and Brazil, as his side failed to progress from their group. Nunweiller played nine matches and scored one goal in the 1972 Euro qualifiers, managing to reach the quarter-finals where Romania was defeated by Hungary, who advanced to the final tournament. He made five appearances and scored once in the 1974 World Cup qualifiers. Afterwards he played two games during the Euro 1976 qualifiers, including his last appearance for the national team on 17 April 1975 in a 1–1 draw against Spain.

For representing his country at the 1970 World Cup, Nunweiller was decorated by President of Romania Traian Băsescu on 25 March 2008 with the Ordinul "Meritul Sportiv" – (The Medal "The Sportive Merit") class III.

=== International goals ===
Scores and results list Romania's goal tally first, score column indicates score after each Nunweiller goal.

List of international goals scored by Radu Nunweiller
#	Date	Venue	Cap	Opponent	Score	Result	Competition
1	11 October 1970	Stadionul 23 August, Bucharest, Romania	18	Finland	3–0	3–0	Euro 1972 qualifiers
2	20 September 1972	Helsingin Olympiastadion, Helsinki, Finland	32	Finland	1–0	1–1	1974 World Cup qualifiers

== Managerial career ==
After he ended his playing career in 1979, Nunweiller defected from Romania's communist regime, going to Switzerland where he worked as manager and assistant manager at various clubs. He obtained a promotion to the Swiss Super League with Yverdon-Sport. In the 2002–03 Divizia A season, Nunweiller came back to Romania and had a brief experience at UTA Arad, consisting of seven games (two victories, one draw, four losses). He was also Neuchâtel Xamax's manager in a 2010–11 Swiss Super League game which ended with a 4–1 loss to Basel.

== Honours ==
=== Player ===
Dinamo București

- Divizia A: 1963–64, 1964–65, 1970–71, 1972–73, 1974–75
- Cupa României: 1963–64, 1967–68

Romania U18

- UEFA European Under-18 Championship: 1962

Individual

- Romanian Footballer of the Year (third place): 1969, (fourth place): 1970

=== Manager ===
Yverdon-Sport

- Swiss Challenge League: 2004–05
