= Teodor Lucuță =

Romanian footballer

Personal information
- Date of birth: 2 May 1955
- Place of birth: București, Romania
- Date of death: 11 February 2013 (aged 57)
- Place of death: București, Romania
- Position: Left-back

Youth career
- Dinamo București

Senior career*
Years	Team	Apps	(Gls)
1972–1980	Dinamo București	128	(1)
1980–1981	Petrolul Ploiești		

International career
1973	Romania U18	1	(1)
1973–1977	Romania U21	4	(0)
1974–1977	Romania U23	7	(0)
1975	Romania Olympic	1	(0)
1975–1979	Romania	3	(0)
- * Club domestic league appearances and goals

Teodor Lucuță (2 May 1955 – 11 February 2013) was a Romanian footballer who played for Dinamo București and Petrolul Ploiești as a left-back.

== Club career ==
Lucuță was born on 2 May 1955 in București, Romania. He was a product of Dinamo București's youth center, winning the national junior title as the team's captain in the 1972–73 season. In the same season he also helped the club's senior team win the Divizia A title, being used by coach Ion Nunweiller in five games, making his debut on 10 June 1973 in a 2–0 victory against rivals Steaua București. Lucuță would go on to win another two titles in the 1974–75 and 1976–77 seasons. In the first one, coach Nicolae Dumitru gave him three appearances, and in the second he worked once again with Nunweiller, who used him in 19 games. He played a total of 12 matches in European competitions with The Red Dogs, including a 1–0 home victory against Real Madrid in the 1975–76 European Cup. In his last Divizia A season, he scored his only goal in the league during a 4–0 win over FC Baia Mare. He made his last appearance in the top-league on 26 April 1980 in a 2–0 loss to FCM Galați, totaling 128 matches in the competition. Lucuță ended his career after playing in the 1980–81 Divizia B season for Petrolul Ploiești.

== International career ==
Between 1973 and 1975, Lucuță made several appearances for Romania's under-18, under-21, under-23 and Olympic teams.

Lucuță played three matches for Romania, making his debut on 16 November 1975 under coach Valentin Stănescu in a 2–2 draw against Spain in the Euro 1976 qualifiers. His following game was a friendly that ended in a 2–2 draw against Soviet Union. His third and final appearance for the national team took place on 4 April 1979 in another 2–2 draw against Spain, this time in the Euro 1980 qualifiers.

== Death ==
Lucuță died on 11 February 2013 at age 57.

== Honours ==
Dinamo București

- Divizia A: 1972–73, 1974–75, 1976–77
