= Florin Cheran =

Romanian footballer

Personal information
- Date of birth: 5 April 1947 (age 79)
- Place of birth: Bucharest, Romania
- Height: 1.75 m (5 ft 9 in)
- Position: Defender

Youth career
- 1962–1965: Unirea Râmnicu Vâlcea

Senior career*
Years	Team	Apps	(Gls)
1967–1969	Electronica București	20	(0)
1969–1980	Dinamo București	284	(8)
1980–1982	Chimia Râmnicu Vâlcea	41	(0)
1982–1984	Dinamo Victoria București		
1986	Dinamo București	1	(0)
Total		346	(8)

International career^{‡}
1971–1976	Romania Olympic	8	(0)
1974–1978	Romania	29	(0)

Managerial career
- 1982–1984: Dinamo Victoria București (assistant)
- 1984–1985: Dinamo Victoria București
- 1985: Dinamo București (assistant)
- 1985: Dinamo București (caretaker)
- 1985–2000: Dinamo București (assistant)
- 2000: Romania U21 (assistant)
- 2001: Romania (assistant)
- 2002: Dinamo București (assistant)
- 2009–2010: Romania U17
- * Club domestic league appearances and goals as of 26 December 2019 ‡ National team caps and goals as of 26 December 2019

Florin Cheran (born 5 April 1947) is a Romanian former footballer who played as a defender.

== Club career ==
Cheran was born on 5 April 1947 in Bucharest, Romania, but spent his childhood in Râmnicu Vâlcea where he played junior-level football at local club Unirea. During that period he also practiced athletics and volleyball, being national champion at the child level long jump. He started to play senior-level football at Divizia B club, Electronica București.

In 1969, Cheran went to play for Dinamo București, making his Divizia A debut on 16 August 1969, under coach Traian Ionescu in a 5–2 victory against Jiul Petroșani. He won four Divizia A titles with The Red Dogs. In the first of these, under the guidance of Nicolae Dumitru and Ionescu, he contributed one goal scored in 29 matches. For the second title, Ion Nunweiller used him in 16 games, and in the third, Nicolae Dumitru sent him on the field 31 times. Finally, for the fourth title, he worked with Ion Nunweiller again, scoring three goals in 34 matches. Cheran also played 23 matches in European competitions with Dinamo, earning historical victories in the European Cup against Madrid giants Real and Atlético, but on both occasions they got eliminated, as the aggregate result was in favor of the Spaniards. For the way he played in 1976, Cheran was placed fifth in the ranking for the Romanian Footballer of the Year award.

In 1980, Cheran went to play for Chimia Râmnicu Vâlcea, the team from his childhood town, for two seasons. He then returned to Divizia B with Dinamo Victoria București, the club where he began his senior career and which had since been renamed. In the 1985–86 season he became Mircea Lucescu's assistant at Dinamo București. He also played his last Divizia A game, a 2–0 victory against Bihor Oradea on 8 June 1986 in which he replaced Iulian Mihăescu in the 74th minute due to squad issues at the time. Cheran has a total of 326 Divizia A appearances in which he scored eight goals.

== International career ==
Cheran played 29 matches for Romania, making his debut under coach Valentin Stănescu on 5 June 1974 in 0–0 friendly draw against Netherlands. He played five games in the Euro 1976 qualifiers and four in the 1978 World Cup qualifiers. Cheran made three appearances during the 1973–76 Balkan Cup and three in the successful 1977–80 Balkan Cup. He also played eight matches for Romania's Olympic team.

== Managerial career ==
Cheran started his managerial career while still an active player, serving as Constantin Teașcă’s assistant at Dinamo Victoria București from 1982 until 1984. In 1984, he was named the team's head coach, helping it gain promotion to Divizia A. Afterwards, he became Constantin Cernăianu's assistant at Dinamo București but after Cernăianu left, Cheran was caretaker coach for one game, before becoming Mircea Lucescu's assistant. He remained with the club for 15 years, assisting every head coach during that period. During the 1995–96 season, Cheran was Dinamo's head coach for a few rounds, following the departure of Remus Vlad. In 2000 he worked as Ion Moldovan's assistant at Romania's under 21 national team and afterwards he was the assistant of László Bölöni and Gheorghe Hagi at Romania's senior side. In 2002 he was Ion Moldovan's assistant at Dinamo București, then he went to work for the Romanian Football Federation, being the head coach of various junior national team squads over the course of almost nine years.

== Honours ==
=== Player ===
Dinamo București

- Divizia A: 1970–71, 1972–73, 1974–75, 1976–77

Romania

- Balkan Cup: 1977–80, runner-up 1973–76

Individual

- Romanian Footballer of the Year (fifth place): 1976

=== Manager ===
Dinamo Victoria București

- Divizia B: 1984–85
