= Dudu Georgescu =

Romanian footballer (1950–2026)

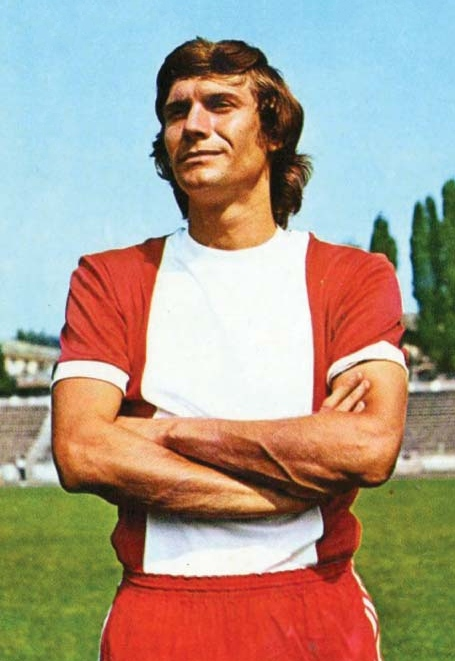
- Georgescu in the 1970s

Personal information
- Date of birth: 1 September 1950
- Place of birth: Bucharest, Romania
- Date of death: 21 November 2026 (aged 76)
- Place of death: Toronto, Ontario, Canada
- Height: 1.84 m (6 ft 0 in)
- Position: Striker

Youth career
- 1962–1969: Progresul București

Senior career*
Years	Team	Apps	(Gls)
1969–1972	Progresul București	95	(20)
1972–1973	CSM Reșița	12	(7)
1973–1983	Dinamo București	260	(207)
1983–1984	SC Bacău	22	(4)
1984–1986	Gloria Buzău	44	(27)
1986	Flacăra Moreni	4	(2)
1987	Muscelul Câmpulung		
1987–1988	Unirea Urziceni		
Total		437	(267)

International career
1973–1984	Romania	40	(21)

Managerial career
- 1989–1990: CSM Reșița (assistant)
- 1991: Zimbru Chișinău
- 1992: Corvinul Hunedoara
- 1992: CSM Reșița
- 1993–1994: Acvila Giurgiu
- 1994–1995: Dunărea Călărași
- 2001: Al-Najma
- * Club domestic league appearances and goals

Dudu Georgescu (1 September 1950 – c. 21 November 2026) was a Romanian footballer who played as a forward and coach.

== Club career ==
Georgescu was born on 1 September 1950 in Bucharest, Romania. He began his career at Progresul București, making his Divizia A debut on 11 June 1969 under coach Cornel Drăgușin in a 3–0 victory against Universitatea Craiova in which he played as a central defender. After playing for Progresul in the first two leagues for a few years, Georgescu went to play for a short while at CSM Reșița, where he scored a double in a 4–1 victory against Dinamo București, which convinced them to transfer him.

His Dinamo spell consisted of 10 Divizia A seasons in which he won four league titles and was the team's top-scorer in the first three of those. In the conquest of the first one he was coached by Nicolae Dumitru, in the next two by Ion Nunweiller and Valentin Stănescu respectively, while at the last he worked once again with Dumitru. He won the 1981–82 Cupa României in which he scored two goals in the final that ended with a 3–2 win over FC Baia Mare, Stănescu using him the entire match. Georgescu also made some notable individual performances such as being the Divizia A top-scorer four consecutive times from 1975 until 1978 and winning the European Golden Shoe in 1975 (33 goals) and 1977 (47 goals). He won the Romanian Footballer of the Year award in 1976 and was nominated three times for the Ballon d'Or. With 207 goals scored (including nine in the derby against Steaua București) in 260 Divizia A matches, Georgescu is Dinamo's all time leading top-scorer. He represented The Red Dogs in European competitions by appearing in 23 games in which he scored 17 goals. Seven of these goals were netted in the European Cup of which four are in a 11–0 win over Crusaders, two against Atlético Madrid and one against Dukla Prague. He also scored one goal in a 3–2 win over Inter Milan which helped the team eliminate the Italians in the second round of the 1981–82 UEFA Cup.

After his period spent at Dinamo, Georgescu went to play for SC Bacău, Gloria Buzău and Flacăra Moreni. At the latter he made his last Divizia A appearance on 23 November 1986 in a 3–1 home loss in which he scored his side's goal against his former team, Dinamo, obtaining a competition record of 252 goals scored in 371 games. Georgescu ended his career in 1988 after playing two seasons in Divizia C for Muscelul Câmpulung and Unirea Urziceni.

== International career ==
Georgescu played 40 matches and scored 21 goals for Romania (44/21 including Romania's Olympic team games), making his debut on 14 September 1973 under coach Valentin Stănescu in his national team's biggest ever victory, a 9–0 win in which he scored one goal against Finland in the 1974 World Cup qualifiers. He scored four goals in five matches in the Euro 1976 qualifiers and made three appearances in which he scored two goals during the 1977–80 Balkan Cup. Then he played four games and scored two goals in the 1978 World Cup qualifiers, and made two appearances with two goals netted in a 2–2 draw against Spain during the Euro 1980 qualifiers. Subsequently, he made one appearance in each of the 1982 World Cup qualifiers and the 1984 Euro qualifiers. Georgescu's last game for the national team was 1–0 friendly victory against China.

For helping his country qualify to Euro 1984, Georgescu was decorated by President of Romania Traian Băsescu on 25 March 2008 with the Ordinul "Meritul Sportiv" – (The Medal "The Sportive Merit") class III.

== Managerial career ==
After he ended his playing career, Georgescu coached Romanian teams such as CSM Reșița, Corvinul Hunedoara, Acvila Giurgiu and Dunărea Călărași. He also had coaching spells outside Romania at Moldovan side Zimbru Chișinău and in Saudi Arabia at Al-Najma.

== Personal life and death ==
His son, who is also named Dudu Georgescu, was a football referee who officiated matches including in the Romanian top division, Divizia A.

Georgescu's body was discovered on 21 November 2026. He was aged 76 at the time.

== Career statistics ==
=== Club ===
Appearances and goals by club, season and competition
Club	Season	League			National Cup		Continental		Total	
Club	Season	Division	Apps	Goals	Apps	Goals	Apps	Goals	Apps	Goals
Progresul București	1968–69	Divizia A	1	0	0	0	–		1	0
Progresul București	1969–70	Divizia B	27	15			–		27	15
Progresul București	1970–71	Divizia A	28	5	1	0	–		29	5
Progresul București	1971–72	Divizia B	25	0			–		25	0
Progresul București	1972–73	Divizia B	14	0			–		14	0
Progresul București	Total		95	20	1	0	–		96	20
CSM Reșița	1972–73	Divizia A	12	7	0	0	–		12	7
Dinamo București	1973–74	Divizia A	33	21	1	0	4 (Note: Appearances in the European Cup)	5	38	26
Dinamo București	1974–75	Divizia A	31	33	0	0	3 (Note: Appearances in the UEFA Cup)	1	34	34
Dinamo București	1975–76	Divizia A	32	31	1	0	2	0	35	31
Dinamo București	1976–77	Divizia A	31	47	1	0	2	0	34	47
Dinamo București	1977–78	Divizia A	33	24	3	4	2	1	38	29
Dinamo București	1978–79	Divizia A	27	13	4	3	–		31	16
Dinamo București	1979–80	Divizia A	19	9	0	0	2	4	21	13
Dinamo București	1980–81	Divizia A	22	13	0	0	–		22	13
Dinamo București	1981–82	Divizia A	24	11	3	2	5	3	32	16
Dinamo București	1982–83	Divizia A	8	5	1	1	3	3	12	9
Dinamo București	Total		260	207	14	10	23	17	297	234
SC Bacău	1983–84	Divizia A	22	4	1	0	–		23	4
Gloria Buzău	1984–85	Divizia A	28	16	1	0	–		29	16
Gloria Buzău	1985–86	Divizia A	16	11	0	0	2 (Note: Appearances in the Balkans Cup)	3	18	14
Gloria Buzău	Total		44	27	1	0	2	3	47	30
Flacăra Moreni	1986–87	Divizia A	4	2	0	0	–		4	2
Muscelul Câmpulung	1986–87	Divizia C					–			
Unirea Urziceni	1987–88	Divizia C					–			
Career total			437	267	17	10	25	20	479	297

=== International ===
Appearances and goals by national team and year
National team	Year	Apps	Goals
Romania
Romania	1973	1	1
Romania	1974	4	0
Romania	1975	9	4
Romania	1976	3	2
Romania	1977	9	6
Romania	1978	5	1
Romania	1979	3	3
Romania	1980	0	0
Romania	1981	1	0
Romania	1982	3	3
Romania	1983	0	0
Romania	1984	1	0
Total		40	21

=== International goals ===
Scores and results list Romania's goal tally first, score column indicates score after each Georgescu goal.

List of international goals scored by Dudu Georgescu
#	Date	Venue	Opponent	Score	Result	Competition
1	14 October 1973	23 August Stadium, Bucharest, Romania	Finland	9–0	9–0	1974 World Cup qualifiers
2	11 May 1975	23 August Stadium, Bucharest, Romania	Denmark	1–0	6–1	Euro 1976 qualifiers
3	11 May 1975	23 August Stadium, Bucharest, Romania	Denmark	4–0	6–1	Euro 1976 qualifiers
4	1 June 1975	23 August Stadium, Bucharest, Romania	Scotland	1–0	1–1	Euro 1976 qualifiers
5	16 November 1975	23 August Stadium, Bucharest, Romania	Spain	2–1	2–2	Euro 1976 qualifiers
6	5 June 1976	San Siro, Milan, Italy	Italy	2–4	2–4	Friendly match
7	22 September 1976	23 August Stadium, Bucharest, Romania	Czechoslovakia	1–1	1–1	Friendly match
8	6 October 1976	Letenský Stadion, Prague, Czechoslovakia	Czechoslovakia	2–1	2–3	Friendly match
9	23 March 1977	Stadionul Steaua, Bucharest, Romania	Turkey	1–0	4–0	1977–80 Balkan Cup
10	8 May 1977	Stadion Maksimir, Zagreb, Yugoslavia	Yugoslavia	1–0	2–0	1978 World Cup qualifiers
11	14 August 1977	Stade du FUS, Rabat, Morocco	Czechoslovakia	1–0	3–1	Coupe Mohamed V 1977
12	14 August 1977	Stade du FUS, Rabat, Morocco	Czechoslovakia	2–1	3–1	Coupe Mohamed V 1977
13	21 September 1977	Stadionul Steaua, Bucharest, Romania	Greece	6–1	6–1	Friendly match
14	13 November 1977	Stadionul Steaua, Bucharest, Romania	Yugoslavia	4–4	4–6	1978 World Cup qualifiers
15	22 March 1978	İnönü Stadium, Istanbul, Turkey	Turkey	1–1	1–1	1977–80 Balkan Cup
16	21 March 1979	Stadionul Steaua, Bucharest, Romania	Greece	3–0	3–0	Friendly match
17	4 April 1979	23 August Stadium, Bucharest, Romania	Spain	1–0	2–2	Euro 1980 qualifiers
18	4 April 1979	23 August Stadium, Bucharest, Romania	Spain	2–1	2–2	Euro 1980 qualifiers
19	15 July 1982	Stadionul Areni, Suceava, Romania	Japan	4–0	4–0	Friendly match
20	18 July 1982	23 August Stadium, Bucharest, Romania	Japan	2–1	3–1	Friendly match
21	18 July 1982	23 August Stadium, Bucharest, Romania	Japan	3–1	3–1	Friendly match

== Honours ==
Progresul București

- Divizia B: 1969–70

Dinamo București

- Divizia A: 1974–75, 1976–77, 1981–82, 1982–83
- Cupa României: 1981–82

Individual

- Divizia A top-scorer: 1974–75, 1975–76, 1976–77, 1977–78
- European Golden Shoe: 1974–75, 1976–77
- Ballon d'Or: 1975 (10th place), 1976 (15th place), 1977 (9th place)
- Romanian Footballer of the Year: 1976, (runner-up) 1977
- Dinamo București top-scorer in Divizia A: 207 goals
- Most goals scored in Divizia A: 252 goals
