= Alexandru Sătmăreanu =

Romanian footballer

Personal information
- Full name: Alexandru Ștefan Sătmăreanu
- Date of birth: 9 March 1952 (age 74)
- Place of birth: Oradea, Romania
- Height: 1.88 m (6 ft 2 in)
- Position: Defender

Senior career*
Years	Team	Apps	(Gls)
1969–1971	Crișul Oradea	48	(8)
1971–1980	Dinamo București	193	(17)
1980–1982	VfB Stuttgart	32	(3)
1982–1984	Fort Lauderdale Strikers	29	(0)
1983	Fort Lauderdale Strikers (indoor)	1	(1)
1984–1985	FSV Salmrohr		
Total		303	(29)

International career
1974–1978	Romania	30 (Note: Including two appearances for Romania's Olympic team.)	(0)

Managerial career
- 1989–1992: Eintracht Trier
- * Club domestic league appearances and goals

Alexandru Ștefan Sătmăreanu (born 9 March 1952) is a Romanian former professional footballer who played as a defender.

== Club career ==
=== Crișul Oradea ===
Sătmăreanu was born on 9 March 1952 in Oradea, Romania. He began his career in his hometown at Crișul, making his Divizia A debut on 21 September 1969 under coach Ladislau Vlad in a 2–1 away victory against ASA Târgu Mureș. The team was relegated at the end of that season to Divizia B, but he stayed with the club, helping it get promoted back to the first division after only one season.

=== Dinamo București ===
Sătmăreanu joined Dinamo București in 1971, helping the team win three league titles in the 1972–73, 1974–75 and 1976–77 seasons. In the first one he played 16 games under coach Ion Nunweiller and in the second Nicolae Dumitru used him in 29 games, scoring three goals. In the third one he made 34 appearances with five goals scored while working once again with Nunweiller. In November 1975 he scored a goal in a league derby against Steaua București that ended in a 3–3 draw. Sătmăreanu also represented The Red Dogs in 20 games in European competitions in which he scored two goals, including the only goal of Dinamo's 1–0 home victory against Real Madrid in the 1975–76 European Cup. For the way he played in 1977, Sătmăreanu was placed third in the ranking for the Romanian Footballer of the Year award. On 3 November 1979, he made his last Divizia A appearance in 1–1 draw against FCM Galați, totaling 223 matches with 18 goals in the competition.

=== VfB Stuttgart ===
After playing for Dinamo in a 1979 UEFA Cup match against Eintracht Frankfurt, he illegally remained in Frankfurt and signed with VfB Stuttgart, defying Romania's communist regime which prohibited defection. Sătmăreanu made his Bundesliga debut on 17 January 1981 under coach Jürgen Sundermann in a 2–1 away win over Nürnberg. He made a total of 12 appearances with two goals scored against Bayer Uerdingen and Borussia Dortmund in his first season, helping the team finish in third place. In the following season he appeared in both legs of Stuttgart's 5–3 aggregate loss to Hajduk Split in the first round of the 1981–82 UEFA Cup. He made his last Bundesliga appearance on 8 April 1982 in a 2–0 away loss to Eintracht Braunschweig, totaling 32 matches with three goals in the competition.

=== Late career ===
After two seasons with Stuttgart, Sătmăreanu went to play in the United States for the North American Soccer League team Fort Lauderdale Strikers where he was known as Alexander Szatmar. In 1984, he returned to Germany to play for FSV Salmrohr in the third league for one year, before ending his career.

== International career ==
Sătmăreanu played 28 games for Romania, making his debut on 23 July 1974 when coach Valentin Stănescu introduced him at half-time to replace Cornel Dinu in a 4–1 friendly victory against Japan. He played six games in the Euro 1976 qualifiers and four during the 1978 World Cup qualifiers. Sătmăreanu also played two games in the 1973–76 Balkan Cup and three during the successful 1977–80 Balkan Cup.

== After retirement ==
After ending his playing career, Sătmăreanu owned several businesses in Germany and Luxembourg, and also served as a coach and president at Eintracht Trier, and president at Bihor Oradea.

== Honours ==
Crișul Oradea

- Divizia B: 1970–71

Dinamo București

- Divizia A: 1972–73, 1974–75, 1976–77
- Trofeo Costa de Valencia: 1978

Romania

- Balkan Cup: 1977–80, runner-up 1973–76

Individual

- Romanian Footballer of the Year (third place): 1977
