= 1970–71 FC Dinamo București season =

FC Dinamo București
1970–71 season
- Manager: Dumitru Nicolae Nicuşor
- Divizia A: 1st
- Romanian Cup: Finalist
- Inter-Cities Fairs Cup: 2nd Round
- Top goalscorer: Florea Dumitrache (15 goals)

The 1970–71 season was FC Dinamo București's 22nd season in Divizia A. Dinamo is close to their second double in Romania, but fails to win the Romanian Cup, losing again the final against Steaua. It was the fourth final in a row played by Dinamo. After a two-year break, Dinamo is back in the European cups, playing in the Inter-Cities Fairs Cup where is eliminated in the second round by Liverpool F.C..

== Results ==
Divizia A
| Round | Date | Opponent | Stadium | Result |
|---|---|---|---|---|
| 1 | 30 August 1970 | Dinamo Bacău | H | 2-1 |
| 2 | 6 September 1970 | CFR Cluj | A | 1-0 |
| 3 | 12 September 1970 | Poli Iaşi | H | 1-3 |
| 4 | 20 September 1970 | Progresul București | A | 0-0 |
| 5 | 27 September 1970 | CFR Timişoara | A | 2-1 |
| 6 | 4 October 1970 | Farul Constanţa | H | 4-1 |
| 7 | 17 October 1970 | FC Argeş | A | 1-1 |
| 8 | 25 October 1970 | Steaua București | H | 3-0 |
| 9 | 31 October 1970 | UTA | H | 4-1 |
| 10 | 15 November 1970 | Petrolul Ploieşti | A | 1-2 |
| 11 | 22 November 1970 | Jiul Petroşani | H | 4-0 |
| 12 | 28 November 1970 | Rapid București | A | 1-1 |
| 13 | 6 December 1970 | U Craiova | A | 0-1 |
| 14 | 9 December 1970 | U Cluj | H | 2-1 |
| 15 | 13 December 1970 | Steagul Roşu Braşov | A | 0-0 |
| 16 | 14 March 1971 | SC Bacău | A | 1-1 |
| 17 | 21 March 1971 | CFR Cluj | H | 4-0 |
| 18 | 28 March 1971 | Poli Iaşi | A | 0-0 |
| 19 | 4 April 1971 | Progresul București | H | 1-2 |
| 20 | 11 April 1971 | CFR Timişoara | H | 2-0 |
| 21 | 25 April 1971 | Farul Constanţa | A | 1-2 |
| 22 | 2 May 1971 | FC Argeş | H | 1-0 |
| 23 | 9 May 1971 | Steaua București | A | 1-0 |
| 24 | 22 May 1971 | UTA | A | 2-0 |
| 25 | 30 May 1971 | Petrolul Ploieşti | H | 2-2 |
| 26 | 6 June 1971 | Jiul Petroşani | A | 0-2 |
| 27 | 9 June 1971 | Rapid București | H | 1-1 |
| 28 | 13 June 1971 | U Craiova | H | 1-2 |
| 29 | 20 June 1971 | U Cluj | A | 2-2 |
| 30 | 27 June 1971 | Steagul Roşu Braşov | H | 4-4 |

Divizia A 1970–71 Winners
Dinamo București
6th Title

Cupa României
| Round | Date | Opponent | Stadium | Result |
|---|---|---|---|---|
| Last 32 | 7 March 1971 | Aurora Urziceni | A | 2-0 |
| Last 16 | 24 March 1971 | Chimia Făgăraş | Braşov | 1-0 |
| Quarterfinals, 1st leg | 28 April 1971 | Progresul Brăila | H | 4-1 |
| Quarterfinals, 2nd leg | 2 June 1971 | Progresul Brăila | A | 0-0 |
| Semifinals, 1st leg | 16 June 1971 | Metalul București | A | 0-1 |
| Semifinals, 2nd leg | 23 June 1971 | Metalul București | H | 5-1 |
| Final | 4 July 1971 | Steaua București | București | 2-3 |

== Romanian Cup final ==
4 July 1971

| Dinamo București | 2 – 1 | Steaua București |
|---|---|---|
| Lucescu 2', 58' (pen.) | | Tătaru 23' (pen.) |

Stadionul 23 August, Bucharest
Attendance: 50,000
Referee: Kevork Ghemigean (Bucharest)

DINAMO:
| GK | Mircea Constantinescu |
| DF | Florin Cheran |
| DF | Ion Nunweiller |
| DF | Gabriel Sandu | (substituted off) 46' |
| DF | Augustin Deleanu |
| MF | Cornel Dinu |
| MF | Radu Nunweiller |
| FW | Viorel Sălceanu |
| FW | Doru Popescu | (substituted off) 55' |
| FW | Florea Dumitrache |
| FW | Mircea Lucescu |
Substitutes:
| MF | Mircea Stoenescu | (substituted in) 46' |
| FW | Ion Haidu | (substituted in) 55' |
Manager:
Dumitru Nicolae Nicuşor

STEAUA:
| GK | Carol Haidu |
| DF | Lajos Sătmăreanu |
| DF | Marius Ciugarin |
| DF | Gheorghe Cristache |
| DF | Iosif Vigu |
| MF | Vasile Negrea |
| MF | Ioan Naom |
| FW | Nicolae Pantea |
| FW | Gheorghe Tătaru |
| FW | Anghel Iordănescu |
| FW | Dumitru Dumitriu | (substituted off) 70' |
Substitutes:
| FW | Vasile Aelenei | (substituted in) 70' |
Manager:
Ştefan Kovacs

== Inter-Cities Fairs Cup ==
First round

16 September 1970
16:00

| FC Dinamo București | 5 – 0 | PAOK |
|---|---|---|
| Dumitrache 8', 49', 73'; Popescu 64', 83' |

Stadionul Dinamo, Bucharest
Attendance: 20,000
Referee: Sándor Petri (Hungary)

30 September 1970
20:30

| PAOK | 1 – 0 | FC Dinamo București |
|---|---|---|
| Koudas 80' |

Toumba Stadium, Thessaloniki
Attendance: 30,000
Referee: Sergio Gonella (Italy)

Dinamo București won 5-1 on aggregate

Second round

21 October 1970
20:30

| Liverpool F.C. | 3 – 0 | FC Dinamo București |
|---|---|---|
| Lindsay 60'; Lawler 73'; Hughes 83' |

Anfield Road, Liverpool
Attendance: 36,525
Referee: Roger Machin (France)

4 November 1970
14:15

| FC Dinamo București | 1 – 1 | Liverpool F.C. |
|---|---|---|
| Sălceanu 34' | | Boersma 48' |

Stadionul 23 August, Bucharest
Attendance: 50,000
Referee: Erich Linemayr (Austria)

Liverpool F.C. won 4-1 on aggregate

== Squad ==
Goalkeepers: Mircea Constantinescu (27 / 0); Marin Andrei (4 / 0); Iosif Cavai (1 / 0).
Defenders: Florin Cheran (27 / 1); Ion Nunweiller (20 / 0); Mircea Stoenescu (20 / 0); Cornel Dinu (24 / 4); Gabriel Sandu (9 / 0); Augustin Deleanu (27 / 3); Constantin Ștefan (8 / 0); Nicolae Petre (2 / 0).
Midfielders: Viorel Sălceanu (26 / 8); Alexandru Mustățea (18 / 0); Radu Nunweiller (30 / 5).
Forwards: Alexandru Moldovan (12 / 0); Petre Nuțu (12 / 0); Florea Dumitrache (28 / 15); Mircea Lucescu (23 / 3); Gavril Both (10 / 1); Doru Popescu (22 / 7); Ion Haidu (14 / 2); Ion Moț (3 / 0).
(league appearances and goals listed in brackets)

Manager: Nicolae Dumitru.

== Transfers ==
Before the season, Dinamo transferred Alexandru Mustățea from Universitatea Cluj, and Mircea Constantinescu from Politehnica Iaşi. Ion Nunweiller returned after two seasons spent at Fenerbahçe. Constantin Frățilă went to FC Argeş, Ion Pîrcălab to Nîmes Olympique, in France and Vasile Gergely to Hertha Berlin. Ion Moţ is transferred from Unirea Alba Iulia during the season. Gabriel Sandu is promoted from the second team.
