= 1971–72 FC Dinamo București season =

FC Dinamo București
1971–72 season
- Manager: Dumitru Nicolae Nicuşor
- Divizia A: 7th
- Romanian Cup: Semifinals
- European Cup: 2nd Round

The 1971–72 season was FC Dinamo București's 23rd season in Divizia A. Dinamo had a modest season in the championship, ending only seventh. In the European Cup, Dinamo eliminated Spartak Trnava. What followed was a double loss against Feyenoord: 0–3 and 0–2.

== Results ==
Divizia A
Round	Date	Opponent	Stadium	Result
1	22 August 1971	CFR Cluj	A	3-1
2	29 August 1971	Steagul Roşu Braşov	H	2-2
3	5 September 1971	Poli Iaşi	A	1-0
4	11 September 1971	Rapid București	A	1-2
5	25 September 1971	U Craiova	H	3-0
6	3 October 1971	ASA Târgu Mureş	A	0-0
7	15 October 1971	U Cluj	H	3-2
8	24 October 1971	Farul Constanţa	A	0-1
9	30 October 1971	UTA	H	1-1
10	17 November 1971	Jiul Petroşani	A	1-2
11	28 November 1971	Crişul Oradea	H	3-1
12	1 December 1971	Steaua București	H	1-0
13	5 December 1971	SC Bacău	A	1-3
14	8 December 1971	Petrolul Ploieşti	H	1-1
15	12 December 1971	FC Argeş	A	2-3
16	12 March 1972	CFR Cluj	H	0-0
17	19 March 1972	Steagul Roşu Braşov	A	1-2
18	26 March 1972	Poli Iaşi	H	1-0
19	2 April 1972	Rapid București	H	1-0
20	12 April 1972	U Craiova	A	1-2
21	16 April 1972	ASA Târgu Mureş	H	1-2
22	19 April 1972	U Cluj	A	1-2
23	4 May 1972	Farul Constanţa	H	0-0
24	24 May 1972	UTA	A	2-1
25	28 May 1972	Jiul Petroşani	H	3-0
26	31 May 1972	Crişul Oradea	A	3-3
27	4 June 1972	Steaua București	A	1-0
28	11 June 1972	SC Bacău	H	6-0
29	21 June 1972	Petrolul Ploieşti	A	0-2
30	25 June 1972	FC Argeş	H	2-3

Cupa României
Round	Date	Opponent	Stadium	Result
Last 32	5 March 1972	Petrolul Moineşti	A	4-1
Last 16	15 March 1972	Tractorul Brașov	Ploieşti	3-2
Quarterfinals	29 March 1972	FC Politehnica Timișoara	Turnu Severin	2-0
Semifinals	28 June 1972	Jiul Petroşani	Piteşti	6-7 (pen.)

== European Cup ==
First round

15 September 1971
16:00

FC Dinamo București	0 – 0	Spartak Trnava

Stadionul 23 August, Bucharest
Attendance: 30,000
Referee: Paul Schiller (Austria)

29 September 1971
15:15

Spartak Trnava	2 – 2	FC Dinamo București
Kabát 40'; Dobias 69' (pen.)		Popescu 64', 88'

Spartak Stadium, Trnava
Attendance: 30,000
Referee: Hans-Joachim Weiland (West Germany)

Dinamo București won 2–2 on aggregate due to away goals

Second round

20 October 1971
15:15

FC Dinamo București	0 – 3	Feyenoord
		Wery 37'; Maiwald 43'; Schneider 59'

Stadionul 23 August, Bucharest
Attendance: 40,000
Referee: Dogan Babacan (Turkey)

3 November 1971
23:30

Feyenoord	2 – 0	FC Dinamo București
Nunweiller 52' (o.g.); Schoenmaker 65'

Feijenoord Stadion, Rotterdam
Attendance: 70,000
Referee: Norman Burtenshaw (England)

Feyenoord Rotterdam won 5-0 on aggregate

== Squad ==
Goalkeepers: Marin Andrei, Iosif Cavai, Mircea Constantinescu.

Defenders: Florin Cheran, Augustin Deleanu, Cornel Dinu, Vasile Dobrău, Dan Gașpar, Ion Nunweiller, Gabriel Sandu, Mircea Stoenescu.

Midfielders: Alexandru Mustățea, Radu Nunweiller, Viorel Sălceanu, Alexandru Sătmăreanu.

Forwards: Ion Batacliu, Alexandru Custov, Florea Dumitrache, Florian Dumitrescu, Emil Dumitriu, Mircea Lucescu, Doru Popescu.

== Transfers ==
Before the season, Dinamo transferred Alexandru Sătmăreanu (Crişul Oradea), Florian Dumitrescu (UTA) and Emil Dumitriu (Steagul Roşu). Alexandru Boc left for Rapid. Alexandru Custov was promoted from the youth team.
