= 1972–73 FC Dinamo București season =

FC Dinamo București
1972–73 season
- Manager: Ion Nunweiller
- Divizia A: 1st
- Romanian Cup: Last 16
- Top goalscorer: Florea Dumitrache (15 goals)

The 1972–73 season was FC Dinamo București's 24th season in Divizia A. With a new manager, Ion Nunweiller, Dinamo competed with Universitatea Craiova for the championship until the last day, winning the title after a defeat suffered by Craiova away at UTA. In the Romanian Cup, Dinamo was eliminated by the third division side Constructorul Galaţi.

== Results ==
Divizia A
1	20 August 1972	Petrolul Ploiești	A	1-1
2	27 August 1972	U Craiova	H	5-2
3	9 September 1972	UTA	A	1-0
4	24 September 1972	Sportul Studențesc	A	0-3
5	1 October 1972	FC Argeş	H	3-1
6	8 October 1972	Jiul Petroșani	A	1-2
7	15 October 1972	Steagul Roșu Brașov	H	1-0
8	21 October 1972	Rapid București	A	0-0
9	5 November 1972	ASA Târgu Mureș	A	0-1
10	12 November 1972	CSM Reșița	H	2-0
11	15 November 1972	CFR Cluj	A	1-1
12	19 November 1972	Steaua București	H	2-1
13	26 November 1972	U Cluj	H	3-1
14	10 December 1972	SC Bacău	A	1-2
15	14 December 1972	FC Constanța	H	2-0
16	11 March 1973	Petrolul Ploiești	H	3-1
17	25 March 1973	U Craiova	A	0-1
18	1 April 1973	UTA	H	2-1
19	8 April 1973	Sportul Studențesc	H	3-3
20	11 April 1973	FC Argeş	A	0-1
21	22 April 1973	Jiul Petroșani	H	2-1
22	28 April 1973	Steagul Roșu Brașov	A	1-0
23	13 May 1973	Rapid București	H	0-2
24	16 May 1973	ASA Târgu Mureș	H	2-0
25	3 June 1973	CSM Reșița	A	1-4
26	24 June 1973	CFR Cluj	H	4-0
27	10 June 1973	Steaua București	A	2-0
28	13 June 1973	U Cluj	A	5-1
29	17 June 1973	SC Bacău	H	2-2
30	20 June 1973	FC Constanța	A	1-0

Divizia A 1972–73 Winners
Dinamo București
7th Title

Cupa României
Round	Date	Opponent	Stadium	Result
Last 32	2 December 1972	Chimia Făgăraș	A	7-0
Last 16	30 mai 1973	Constructorul Galați	Ploiești	0-1

== Squad ==
Goalkeepers: Mircea Constantinescu (10 / 0); Constantin Eftimescu (1 / 0); Iosif Cavai (12 / 0); Adrian Rămureanu (8 / 0).
Defenders: Florin Cheran (16 / 0); Vasile Dobrău (27 / 0); Gabriel Sandu (28 / 0); Augustin Deleanu (23 / 0); Nicolae Petre (10 / 0); Alexandru Sătmăreanu (16 / 0); Vasile Cosma (6 / 1); Teodor Lucuță (5 / 0).
Midfielders: Mircea Stoenescu (8 / 1); Cornel Dinu (23 / 2); Ion Batacliu (3 / 0).
Forwards: Mircea Lucescu (28 / 12); Radu Nunweiller (30 / 7); Florea Dumitrache (26 / 15); Florian Dumitrescu (26 / 5); Alexandru Moldovan (25 / 2); Viorel Sălceanu (17 / 2); Doru Popescu (24 / 4); Marin Roșu (2 / 0).
(league appearances and goals listed in brackets)

Manager: Ion Nunweiller.

== Transfers ==
Emil Dumitriu is transferred to Rapid. Teodor Lucuță is promoted from the youth team.
