= 1971 Cupa României final =

- Event: 1970–71 Cupa României
Steaua București	Dinamo București
3	2
- Date: 4 July 1971
- Venue: 23 August, Bucharest
- Referee: Kevork Ghemigean (Bucharest)
- Attendance: 50,000

The 1971 Cupa României final was the 33rd final of Romania's most prestigious football cup competition. It was disputed between Steaua București and Dinamo București, and was won by Steaua București after a game with 5 goals. It was the 11th cup for Steaua București.

== Match details ==
4 July 1971
17:30 EET

Steaua București	3–2	Dinamo București
Tătaru 23' (pen.), 30', 80'	Report	Lucescu 2', 58' (pen.)

23 August, Bucharest
Attendance: 50,000
Referee: Kevork Ghemigean (Bucharest)

GK	1	(Romania) Carol Haidu
DF	2	(Romania) Lajos Sătmăreanu
DF	3	(Romania) Marius Ciugarin
DF	4	(Romania) Gheorghe Cristache
DF	5	(Romania) Iosif Vigu
MF	6	(Romania) Vasile Negrea
MF	7	(Romania) Ioan Naom
FW	8	(Romania) Nicolae Pantea
FW	9	(Romania) Gheorghe Tătaru
FW	10	(Romania) Anghel Iordănescu
FW	11	(Romania) Dumitru Dumitriu (substituted off) 70'
Substitutions:
FW	12	(Romania) Vasile Aelenei (substituted in) 70'
Manager:
(Romania) Ştefan Kovacs

GK	1	(Romania) Mircea Constantinescu
DF	2	(Romania) Florin Cheran
DF	3	(Romania) Ion Nunweiller (c)
DF	4	(Romania) Gabriel Sandu (substituted off) 46'
DF	5	(Romania) Augustin Deleanu
MF	6	(Romania) Cornel Dinu
MF	7	(Romania) Radu Nunweiller
FW	8	(Romania) Viorel Sălceanu
FW	9	(Romania) Doru Popescu (substituted off) 55'
FW	10	(Romania) Florea Dumitrache
FW	11	(Romania) Mircea Lucescu
Substitutions:
DF	12	(Romania) Mircea Stoenescu (substituted in) 46'
FW	13	(Romania) Ion Haidu (substituted in) 55'
Manager:
(Romania) Dumitru Nicolae Nicuşor (Romania) Traian Ionescu

== See also ==
- List of Cupa României finals
- Eternal derby (Romania)
