= 1970 Cupa României final =

- Event: 1969–70 Cupa României
Steaua București	Dinamo București
2	1
- Date: 26 July 1970
- Venue: 23 August, Bucharest
- Referee: Gheorghe Limona (Bucharest)
- Attendance: 30,000

The 1970 Cupa României final was the 32nd final of Romania's most prestigious football cup competition. It was disputed between Steaua București and Dinamo București, and was won by Steaua București after a game with 3 goals. It was the 10th cup for Steaua București.

== Match details ==
26 July 1970
17:30 EET

Steaua București	2–1	Dinamo București
Voinea 7', 56'	Report	Dumitrache 79'

23 August, Bucharest
Attendance: 30,000
Referee: Gheorghe Limona (Bucharest)

GK	1	(Romania) Vasile Suciu
DF	2	(Romania) Gheorghe Cristache
DF	3	(Romania) Lajos Sătmăreanu
DF	4	(Romania) Marius Ciugarin
DF	5	(Romania) Iosif Vigu
MF	10	(Romania) Dumitru Dumitriu
MF	7	(Romania) Ioan Naom
MF	6	(Romania) Costică Ștefănescu (substituted off) 60'
FW	9	(Romania) Florea Voinea
FW	8	(Romania) Anghel Iordănescu
FW	11	(Romania) Carol Creiniceanu (substituted off) 65'
Substitutions:
FW	12	(Romania) Vasile Negrea (substituted in) 60'
FW	13	(Romania) Mihai Mirăuţă (substituted in) 65'
Manager:
(Romania) Ştefan Kovacs

GK	1	(Romania) Iosif Cavai
DF	2	(Romania) Florin Cheran
DF	4	(Romania) Lică Nunweiller (substituted off) 46'
DF	6	(Romania) Cornel Dinu
DF	3	(Romania) Augustin Deleanu
MF	5	(Romania) Viorel Sălceanu
MF	10	(Romania) Radu Nunweiller
FW	8	(Romania) Ion Pârcălab
FW	11	(Romania) Mircea Lucescu
FW	9	(Romania) Florea Dumitrache
MF	7	(Romania) Ion Haidu (substituted off) 64'
Substitutions:
DF	12	(Romania) Mircea Stoenescu (substituted in) 46'
FW	13	(Romania) Gavril Both (substituted in) 64'
Manager:
(Romania) Dumitru Nicolae Nicuşor

== See also ==
- List of Cupa României finals
- Eternal derby (Romania)
