= Doru Popescu =

Romanian footballer

Personal information
- Date of birth: 29 March 1949
- Place of birth: Baia de Aramă, Romania
- Date of death: 15 September 2023 (aged 74)
- Height: 1.85 m (6 ft 1 in)
- Position: Forward

Youth career
- 1967–1969: Dinamo București

Senior career*
Years	Team	Apps	(Gls)
1969–1973	Dinamo București	88	(22)
1973–1974	CSM Reșița	27	(2)
1974–1976	Argeș Pitești	46	(7)
1976–1977	Rapid București	11	(1)
Total		172	(32)

International career
1970–1971	Romania U23	2	(0)
- * Club domestic league appearances and goals

Doru Popescu (29 March 1949 – 15 September 2023) was a Romanian football forward.

== Club career ==
Popescu was born on 29 March 1949 in Baia de Aramă, Romania and began playing junior-level football at Dinamo București. He made his Divizia A debut on 16 August 1969 under coach Nicolae Dumitru in Dinamo's 5–2 home victory against Jiul Petroșani. Popescu won two league titles with The Red Dogs. At the first, coaches Dumitru and Traian Ionescu gave him 22 appearances in which he scored seven goals, while in the second he played 24 matches with four goals netted under coach Ion Nunweiller. He reached two Cupa României finals with Dinamo. However, both of them were lost, Popescu playing only in the 1971 final where he was a starter, being replaced in the 55th minute with Ion Haidu as they lost 3–2 to Steaua București. Popescu also represented Dinamo in European competitions. First he played three games in the 1970–71 Inter-Cities Fairs Cup, managing to score a double in a 5–0 victory against PAOK which helped them advance to the next round where they were eliminated by Liverpool. Subsequently, he played four games in the 1971–72 European Cup. He made the match of his career in the second leg of the first round against Spartak Trnava when he came as a substitute and replaced Viorel Sălceanu in 58th minute, managing to score a double, the result being a 2–2 on aggregate which gave Dinamo the qualification to the next round on the away goals rule. After that game Romanian newspaper Sportul wrote:"A tall and broad Oltenia man from Severin, nicknamed Dulapul (The Cabinet), rather a reserve at Dinamo, entered at Trnava in the second half and made the match of his life". In the following round they were eliminated by Feyenoord.

In 1973, Popescu joined CSM Reșița for one season, after which he spent two years at Argeș Pitești. Then he played one more season at Rapid București where he made his last Divizia A appearance on 12 June 1977 in a 0–0 draw against FCM Reșița. Popescu accumulated a total of 172 matches with 32 goals in the competition and 22 games with nine goals in the Cupa României.

== International career ==
In the early 1970s, Popescu played two games for Romania's under-23 side, both of which were draws against Poland and Czechoslovakia.

== Death ==
Popescu died on 15 September 2023 at age 74.

== Honours ==
Dinamo București

- Divizia A: 1970–71, 1972–73
- Cupa României runner-up: 1969–70, 1970–71
