= Augustin Deleanu =

Romanian footballer (1944–2014)

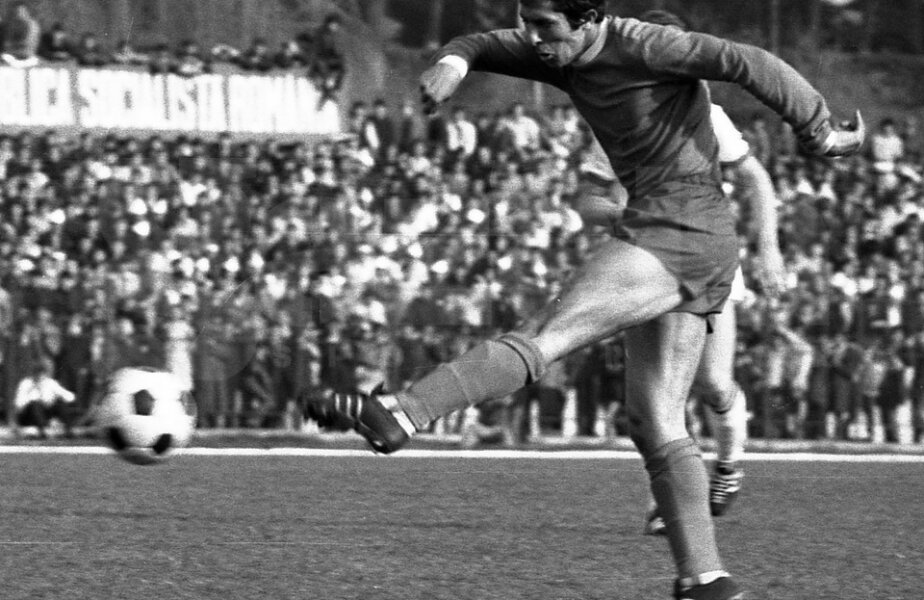
- Deleanu with Dinamo in 1973

Personal information
- Full name: Augustin Pax Deleanu
- Date of birth: 23 August 1944
- Place of birth: Măgurele, Romania
- Date of death: 27 March 2014 (aged 69)
- Place of death: Bucharest, Romania
- Height: 1.74 m (5 ft 9 in)
- Position: Left back

Youth career
- 1960–1963: Steaua București

Senior career*
Years	Team	Apps	(Gls)
1963–1969	Politehnica Iași	134	(11)
1969–1976	Dinamo București	178	(7)
1976–1977	Jiul Petroșani	31	(0)
Total		343	(18)

International career
1966–1973	Romania	25	(0)
- * Club domestic league appearances and goals

Augustin Pax "Coco" Deleanu (23 August 1944 – 27 March 2014) was a Romanian footballer, who played as a left back.

== Club career ==
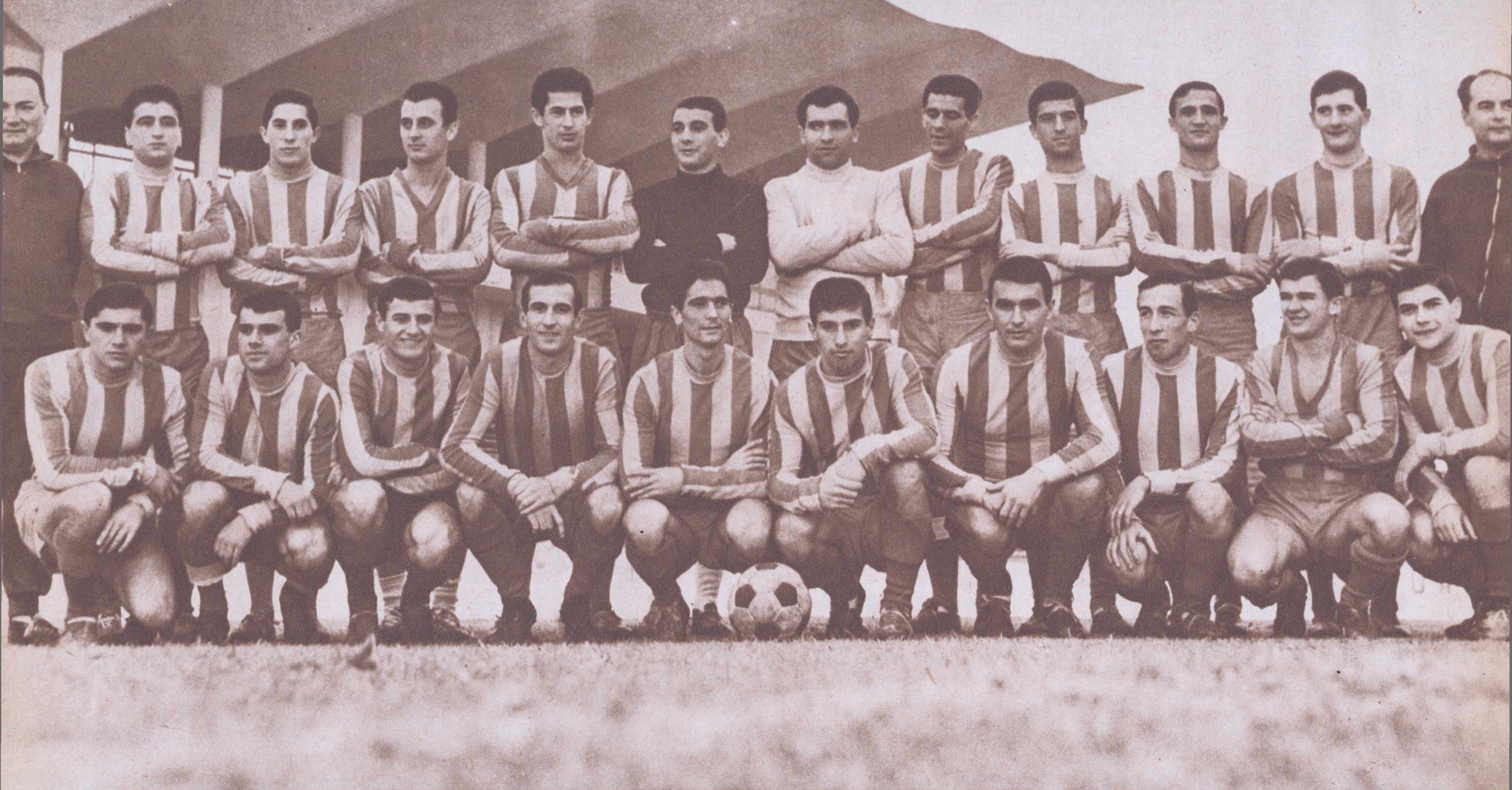
Deleanu (back row, third from the left) with Poli Iași in 1965

Deleanu, nicknamed "Coco", was born on 23 August 1944 in Măgurele, Romania and began playing junior-level football in 1960 at Steaua București. Three years later he joined Politehnica Iași where on 24 November 1963 he made his Divizia A debut under coach Constantin Teașcă in a 1–0 victory against Petrolul Ploiești. He spent six seasons at Politehnica, a period in which the club was relegated to Divizia B, but he stayed with the team, helping it gain promotion back to the first league after one season.

In 1968, he joined Dinamo București where his first performances were reaching two Cupa României finals in 1970 and 1971, playing all the minutes in both which were lost to rivals Steaua București. He won three league titles with The Red Dogs in 1971, 1973 and 1975. In the first he contributed with three goals scored in the 27 matches he was used by coaches Nicolae Dumitru and Traian Ionescu. For the second title he played 23 games under the guidance of Ion Nunweiller and in the third he made 33 appearances while working once again with Dumitru. He spent seven seasons at Dinamo in which he also appeared in 16 matches in European competitions (including four in the Inter-Cities Fairs Cup).

In 1976, Deleanu went to play for Jiul Petroșani where he made his last Divizia A appearance on 30 June 1977 in a 2–0 loss to Universitatea Craiova, totaling 325 matches with 18 goals in the competition.

== International career ==
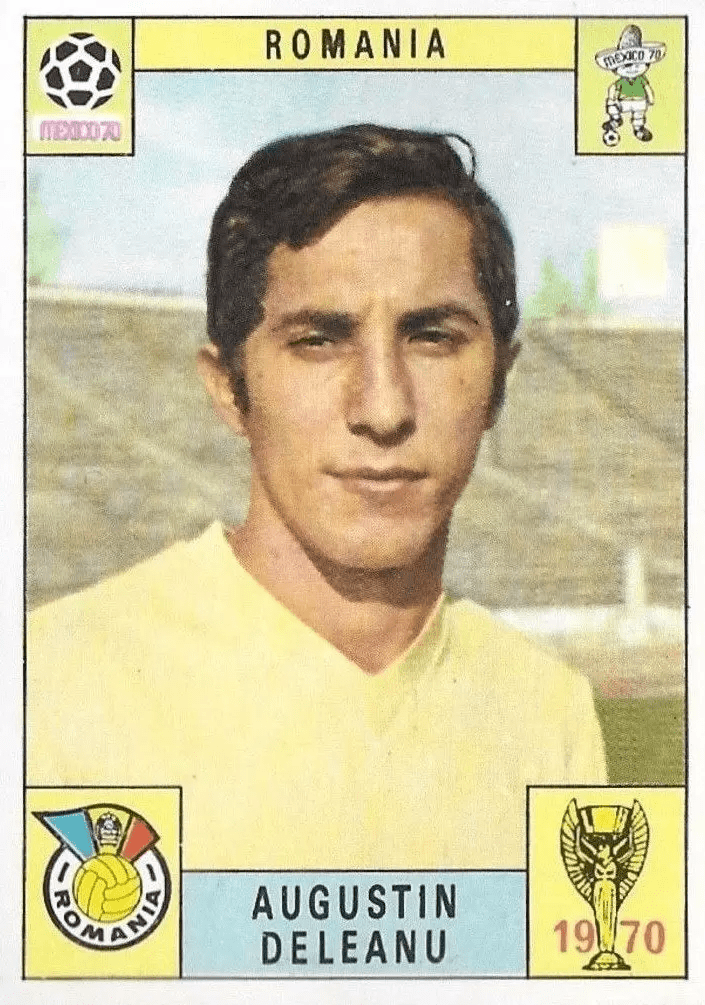
Deleanu with Romania

Deleanu played 25 games without scoring for Romania, making his debut on 26 November 1966 under coach Ilie Oană in a 3–1 loss to Italy in the 1968 Euro qualifiers. His second appearance for the national team also occurred there in a 5–1 victory against Cyprus. He played four games in the successful 1970 World Cup qualifiers. Deleanu was selected by coach Angelo Niculescu to be part of the squad that went to the final tournament, but he did not play a single match there. He played five matches in the 1972 Euro qualifiers, managing to reach the quarter-finals where Romania was defeated by Hungary, who advanced to the final tournament. Deleanu played five matches during the 1974 World Cup qualifiers, including his last appearance for The Tricolours that took place on 14 October 1973 in Romania's biggest ever victory, a 9–0 against Finland.

For representing his country at the 1970 World Cup, Deleanu was decorated by President of Romania Traian Băsescu on 25 March 2008 with the Ordinul "Meritul Sportiv" – (The Medal "The Sportive Merit") class III.

== After retirement ==
After he ended his playing career, Deleanu became a referee, officiating matches in Romania's top-league Divizia A. He also had different administration positions at Dinamo București, between 1990 and 1994 being the club's vice-president.

== Death ==
Deleanu died on 27 March 2014, at the age of 69 at Floreasca Hospital in Bucharest.

== Honours ==
Politehnica Iași

- Divizia B: 1967–68

Dinamo București

- Divizia A: 1970–71, 1972–73, 1974–75
- Cupa României: runner-up 1969–70, 1970–71
