= Iosif Cavai =

Romanian footballer and coach

Personal information
- Date of birth: 1 January 1951 (age 75)
- Place of birth: Folia, Romania
- Height: 1.80 m (5 ft 11 in)
- Position: Goalkeeper

Youth career
- 1966–1968: Electromotor Timișoara

Senior career*
| Years | Team | Apps | (Gls) |
| 1968–1969 | Electromotor Timișoara | | |
| 1969–1976 | Dinamo București | 47 | (0) |
| 1976–1985 | Jiul Petroșani | 249 | (0) |
| 1985–1990 | Universitatea Cluj | 75 | (0) |
| Total | | 371 | (0) |

International career
| 1973 | Romania U21 | 1 | (0) |
| 1973 | Romania U23 | 4 | (0) |
| 1982 | Romania Olympic | 1 | (0) |
| 1982 | Romania B | 2 | (0) |

Managerial career
- 1984: Jiul Petroșani
- * Club domestic league appearances and goals

Iosif Cavai (born 1 January 1951) is a Romanian association football goalkeeper and coach.

== Club career ==
Cavai was born on 1 January 1951 in Folia, Romania and began playing junior-level football in 1966 at Electromotor Timișoara under the guidance of coach Florian Pascu. Afterwards he was promoted by coach Nicolae Maghet to the team's senior squad.

He went to play for Dinamo București where coach Nicolae Dumitru gave him his Divizia A debut on 22 March 1970 in a 3–3 draw against Dinamo Bacău. At the end of his first season, the team reached the 1970 Cupa României final where Dumitru played him for the entire match in the 2–1 loss to rivals Steaua București. In the following season, Dinamo won the championship, but Cavai played only one game as the first-choice goalkeeper was Mircea Constantinescu. In the same season the club reached another Cupa României final, but Constantinescu played in the loss to Steaua. Cavai won two more titles with The Red Dogs, in the first he worked with coach Ion Nunweiller who used him in 12 games and for the second he played two matches under Dumitru. He also played four games in the 1973–74 European Cup campaign as they got past Crusaders after a 12–0 aggregate win in the first round, being eliminated in the second one by Atlético Madrid.

In 1976, he moved to Jiul Petroșani and in his first season the team finished in fifth place. Subsequently, the club reached the 1977–78 Balkans Cup final, with Cavai playing in both legs of their 4–2 aggregate defeat to Rijeka. In the 1979–80 season, Cavai managed to not concede any goals for 589 consecutive minutes.

In 1985 he switched teams again, going to Universitatea Cluj. He spent five seasons with The Red Caps where on 10 December 1989 he made his last Divizia A appearance in a 4–3 home victory against Argeș Pitești, totaling 371 matches in the competition.

== International career ==
Between 1973 and 1982, Cavai played several games for Romania's under-21, under-23, Olympic and B squads.

On 13 May 2020, Gazeta Sporturilor included him on a list of best Romanian players who never played for Romania's national team.

== Managerial career ==
In 1984, Cavai was head coach for a few rounds at Jiul Petroșani while still being an active player.

From 1990 until 2004, he held various positions at Universitatea Cluj, working as a stadium administrator, assistant coach, goalkeeping coach, competition organizer and vice-president of the club. After his period spent at "U" Cluj ended, he went to work for Politehnica Timișoara, first as a goalkeeper coach. Then he went to CFR Timișoara.

From 2009 until 2010 he worked at Școala de Fotbal Ardealul. Afterwards he returned to "U" Cluj to work as a goalkeeper coach for the youth teams.

== Honours ==
Dinamo București

- Divizia A: 1970–71, 1972–73, 1974–75
- Cupa României runner-up: 1969–70, 1970–71

Jiul Petroșani

- Balkans Cup runner-up: 1977–78
