= Mircea Stoenescu =

Romanian footballer and referee (1943–2022)

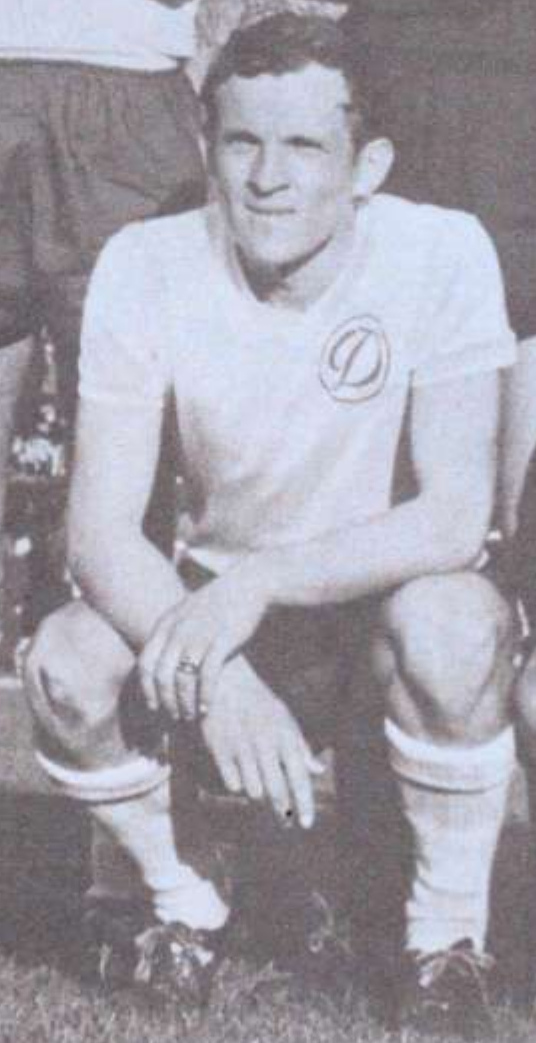
- Stoenescu with Dinamo București in 1968

Personal information
- Date of birth: 11 October 1943
- Place of birth: Bucharest, Romania
- Date of death: 5 January 2022 (aged 78)
- Place of death: Drăgășani, Romania
- Height: 1.76 m (5 ft 9 in)
- Position: Centre back

Youth career
- Dinamo București

Senior career*
Years	Team	Apps	(Gls)
1960–1961	Dinamo București	2	(0)
1961–1963	Dinamo Obor București		
1963–1965	Dinamo Pitești	36	(9)
1965–1973	Dinamo București	120	(2)
1973–1975	Dinamo Slatina (Note: The statistics for the 1974–75 Divizia B season are unavailable.)	15	(2)
Total		173	(13)

International career
1965–1966	Romania U23	2	(0)

Managerial career
- Dinamo Victoria București
- * Club domestic league appearances and goals

Mircea Stoenescu (11 October 1943 – 5 January 2022) was a Romanian football centre-back, manager and referee.

== Club career ==
Stoenescu, nicknamed "Basul", was born on 11 October 1943 in Bucharest, Romania. He started his career by playing at the junior squads of Dinamo București, winning a national title at children level in 1959 and one at junior level in 1961. He made his Divizia A debut on 9 July 1961, playing for The Red Dogs under coach Traian Ionescu in a 2–0 home victory against Steagul Roșu Brașov. In the following season he made one league appearance as the club won the title. Afterwards, Stoenescu went to play for two seasons at Divizia B club Dinamo Obor București. Subsequently, he spent another two seasons at Divizia A team Dinamo Pitești with whom he reached the 1965 Cupa României final, where coach Virgil Mărdărescu used him for the entire match in their 2–1 loss to Știința Cluj.

In 1965, Stoenescu returned to Dinamo București for an eight-season spell in which he won two titles. In the first, coaches Nicolae Dumitru and Ionescu used him in 20 games, and in the second coach Ion Nunweiller gave him eight appearances in which he scored once. He also played four Cupa României finals, winning only the one in 1968, as coach Bazil Marian used him the entire match in the 3–1 win over Rapid București in the final.

He made his last Divizia A appearance on 5 November 1972, playing in Dinamo's 1–0 away loss to ASA Târgu Mureș, totaling 158 matches with 11 goals in the competition and seven appearances in European competitions (including four games in the Inter-Cities Fairs Cup). Stoenescu ended his playing career in 1975, after spending two seasons at Divizia B team Dinamo Slatina.

== International career ==
Between 1965 and 1966, Stoenescu made two appearances for Romania's under-23 squad, playing in a victory over Soviet Union and a draw against Austria.

== After retirement ==
After he ended his playing career, Stoenescu worked for a while as a coach at Dinamo Victoria București in the Romanian lower leagues. Subsequently, he became a referee, officiating 39 matches over the course of six seasons in Romania's top-league Divizia A. He was also president at Dinamo București.

== Style of play ==
Stoenescu was nicknamed "Jandarmul lui Dobrin" (The Gendarme of Dobrin) for his duels on the field with the famous player with whom he was a colleague during his spell at Dinamo Pitești, saying in a Gazeta Sporturilor interview from 2019:"Well, I hit the ground with Gicu Dobrin, I made him one with the grass, how I used to roll him! Of course, within the bounds of sportsmanship, because he also ate a piece of bread, after the games we complimented each other. With "Mopsu'" Dumitrache I didn't really succeed, because I had a hard time catching him, he was a brilliant footballer, I say better than Dobrin! I'm not saying that I haven't fouled, but never with a harshness that exceeded the limits, to put the man in front of me in the hospital."

For a while, Stoenescu played in Dinamo București's defense alongside youngster Cornel Dinu. After Stoenescu's death, Dinu wrote an editorial praising his altruistic play, recalling Stoenescu's words:"Go, "Dinoașcă" (that's how he would caress me...), I'll cover you... But don't leave me too long with Săndel (Boc) because he tries again an "oxford" (hitting the ball with the exterior of the heel) and we'll have to take it again from place for recovery."

== Death ==
Stoenescu died in Drăgășani on 5 January 2022, at the age of 78.

== Honours ==
Dinamo București

- Divizia A: 1961–62, 1970–71, 1972–73
- Cupa României: 1967–68, runner-up 1968–69, 1969–70, 1970–71

Dinamo Pitești

- Cupa României runner-up: 1964–65
