= Gabriel Sandu (footballer) =

Romanian footballer

Personal information
- Date of birth: 7 November 1952
- Place of birth: Bucharest, Romania
- Date of death: 1 October 1998 (aged 45)
- Height: 1.79 m (5 ft 10 in)
- Position: Centre back

Senior career*
Years	Team	Apps	(Gls)
1969–1970	Metalul București		
1971–1980	Dinamo București	192	(4)
1980–1981	Progresul București	19	(0)
Total		211	(4)

International career
1973	Romania U21	1	(1)
1973–1974	Romania U23	8	(0)
1974–1976	Romania (Note: Including five appearances and one goal for Romania's Olympic team.)	22	(2)
- * Club domestic league appearances and goals

Gabriel Sandu (7 November 1952 – 1 October 1998) was a Romanian football defender.

== Club career ==
Sandu was born on 7 November 1952 in Bucharest, Romania and began playing football in 1969 at local club Metalul. Afterwards, he joined Dinamo București, making his Divizia A debut on 2 May 1971 in a 1–0 victory against Argeș Pitești. He won the title in his first season spent at the club, coaches Nicolae Dumitru and Traian Ionescu giving him nine appearances. The team also reached the 1971 Cupa României final where he played in the first half of the 3–2 loss to rivals Steaua București, being replaced for the second with Mircea Stoenescu. Sandu won three more titles with The Red Dogs. In the first, he worked with coach Ion Nunweiller who used him in 28 games, then in the second he played 25 matches and scored two goals under Dumitru. In the third, he worked again with Nunweiller, making 29 appearances in which he scored once in a 4–2 victory against Steaua. During his time at Dinamo, Sandu also played 14 games in European competitions, including a 1–0 home victory against Real Madrid in the 1975–76 European Cup.

After spending nine seasons at Dinamo, Sandu went to play for Progresul București. There, he ended his career, making his last Divizia A appearance on 30 October 1981 in a 1–0 victory against Politehnica Timișoara, totaling 211 appearances with four goals in the competition.

== International career ==
Sandu played 17 matches for Romania, making his debut on 5 June 1974 under coach Valentin Stănescu in a 0–0 friendly draw against Netherlands. He played five matches in the Euro 1976 qualifiers and made two appearances during the 1973–76 Balkan Cup. Sandu scored one goal in a friendly against Iran which ended in a 2–2 draw. He made his last appearance for the national team on 22 September 1976 in a 1–1 friendly draw against Czechoslovakia.

Sandu also appeared for Romania's Olympic team in five qualification matches for the 1976 Summer Olympics, scoring one goal in a 4–0 victory against Denmark.

=== International goals ===
Scores and results list Romania's goal tally first, score column indicates score after each Sandu goal.

List of international goals scored by Gabriel Sandu
#	Date	Venue	Cap	Opponent	Score	Result	Competition
1	2 July 1976	Aryamehr Stadium, Tehran, Iran	16	Iran	2–2	2–2	Friendly

== Death ==
Sandu died on 1 October 1998 at the age of 45.

== Honours ==
Dinamo București

- Divizia A: 1970–71, 1972–73, 1974–75, 1976–77
- Cupa României runner-up: 1970–71
