= Alexandru Mustățea =

Romanian footballer and referee

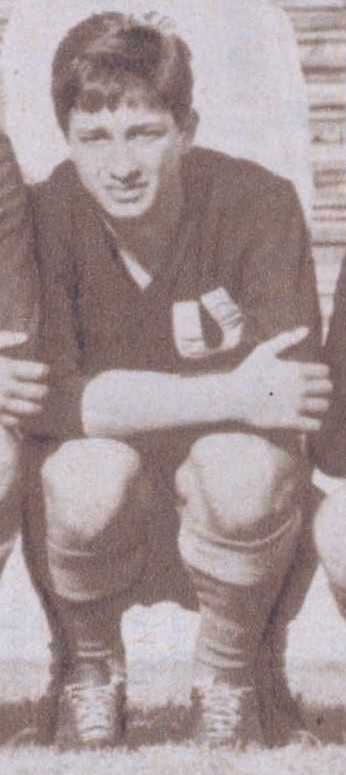

Personal information
- Full name: Alexandru Nicolae Mustățea
- Date of birth: 30 August 1946
- Place of birth: Bucharest, Romania
- Date of death: 12 October 2001 (aged 55)
- Place of death: Hungary
- Height: 1.74 m (5 ft 9 in)
- Position: Central midfielder

Youth career
- 1955–1964: Dinamo București

Senior career*
Years	Team	Apps	(Gls)
1964–1970	Universitatea Cluj	101	(9)
1970–1972	Dinamo București	27	(0)
1972–1977	Argeș Pitești	119	(9)
Total		247	(18)

International career
1966–1967	Romania U23	9	(0)
1966	Romania B	1	(0)
- * Club domestic league appearances and goals

Alexandru Nicolae Mustățea (30 August 1946 – 12 October 2001) was a Romanian football midfielder and referee.

== Club career ==
Mustățea was born on 30 August 1946 in Bucharest, Romania and began playing junior-level football in 1955 at Dinamo București. In 1964 Mustățea joined Universitatea Cluj where he made his Divizia A debut on 16 May 1965 when coach Andrei Sepci sent him in 75th minute to replace Mircea Neșu in a 2–0 home win over Crișul Oradea. He scored his first goal in a 2–1 away loss to Farul Constanța in the third round of the 1966–67 season. In the following season he scored a personal record of six league goals, including one in a 1–0 home victory against Steaua București.

In 1970 he went for two seasons at Dinamo București, coaches Nicolae Dumitru and Traian Ionescu using him in 18 games in the first one as the team won the title. Mustățea switched teams again in 1972 when he arrived at title holders Argeș Pitești, working with coach Florin Halagian who used him in three games in the 1972–73 European Cup campaign, eliminating Aris Bonnevoie in the first round, then in the following one they earned a 2–1 home win against Real Madrid, but lost the second leg with 3–1. Mustățea's last Divizia A appearance took place on 14 November 1976 in a 6–1 away loss to Steaua, totaling 247 matches with 18 goals in the competition and nine games in European competitions.

== International career ==
Between 1966 and 1967, Mustățea played 10 games for Romania's under-23 and B teams.

== Refereeing career ==
After he ended his career, Mustățea worked as a referee, officiating in over 100 matches in Romania's top-league Divizia A.

== Death ==
Mustățea died on 12 October 2001 at age 55 in Hungary.

== Honours ==
Dinamo București

- Divizia A: 1970–71
