= Mircea Constantinescu =

Romanian former footballer

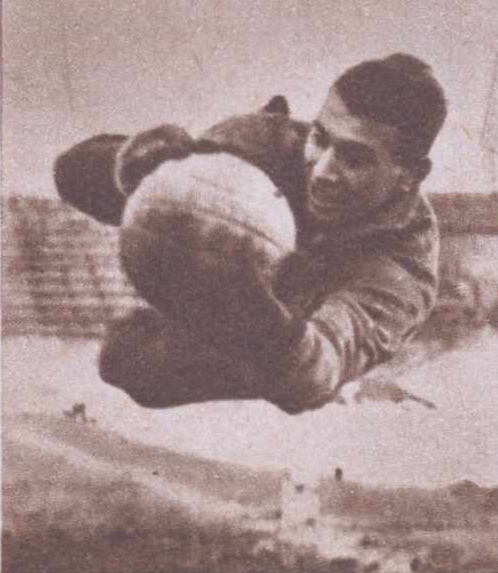

Personal information
- Date of birth: 25 February 1945 (age 81)
- Place of birth: Crăiești, Romania
- Height: 1.71 m (5 ft 7 in)
- Position: Goalkeeper

Senior career*
Years	Team	Apps	(Gls)
1963–1970	Politehnica Iași	169	(0)
1969–1980	Dinamo București	110	(0)
1980–1982	SC Bacău	31	(0)
Total		310	(0)

International career
1967	Romania	2	(0)
- * Club domestic league appearances and goals

Mircea Constantinescu (born 25 February 1945) is a Romanian former footballer who played as a goalkeeper for Politehnica Iași, Dinamo București and SC Bacău.

== Club career ==
Constantinescu was born on 25 February 1945 in Crăiești, Romania. He made his Divizia A debut on 20 October 1963, playing for Politehnica Iași under coach Constantin Teașcă in a 5–3 away loss to Progresul București. He spent seven seasons at Politehnica, a period in which the club suffered a relegation to Divizia B, but he stayed with the team, helping it gain promotion back to the first league after one season. In 1970 he joined Dinamo București, winning the title in his first season spent at the club, coaches Nicolae Dumitru and Traian Ionescu giving him 27 appearances. The team also reached the 1971 Cupa României final where he played the entire match in the 3–2 loss to rivals Steaua București. Constantinescu won two more titles with The Red Dogs, in the first he worked with coach Ion Nunweiller who used him in 10 games and for the second he played 32 matches under Dumitru. After seven seasons spent with Dinamo in which he also appeared in 11 games in European competitions (including four matches in the Inter-Cities Fairs Cup), Constantinescu left the club. He ended his career by spending one season at SC Bacău, making his last Divizia A appearance on 26 June 1977 in a 2–0 home victory against Sportul Studențesc București, totaling 287 matches in the competition.

== International career ==
Constantinescu played two friendly matches for Romania, making his debut under coach Bazil Marian in a 1–1 draw against Uruguay, which took place in Montevideo at Estadio Gran Parque Central. His second game was a 2–1 away victory against Greece.

== Refereeing career ==
After he retired from playing football, Constantinescu became a referee, officiating matches in Romania's top-league Divizia A.

== Honours ==
Politehnica Iași

- Divizia B: 1967–68

Dinamo București

- Divizia A: 1970–71, 1972–73, 1974–75
- Cupa României runner-up: 1970–71
