= Petre Nuțu =

Romanian footballer

Personal information
- Date of birth: 22 September 1943 (age 83)
- Place of birth: Bucharest, Romania
- Height: 1.71 m (5 ft 7 in)
- Position: Central midfielder

Senior career*
Years	Team	Apps	(Gls)
1962–1964	Dinamo Victoria București		
1964–1965	Dinamo Pitești	2	(0)
1965–1966	Dinamo Victoria București		
1967	Dinamo București	5	(0)
1967–1970	Argeș Pitești	71	(22)
1970–1971	Dinamo București	12	(0)
1971–1972	Sportul Studențesc București	16	(0)
Total		106	(22)
- * Club domestic league appearances and goals

Petre Nuțu (born 22 September 1943) is a Romanian former footballer who played as a midfielder.

== Honours ==
Dinamo Pitești

- Cupa României runner-up: 1964–65

Dinamo București

- Divizia A: 1970–71
- Cupa României runner-up: 1970–71

Sportul Studențesc București

- Divizia B: 1971–72
