= Marius Ciugarin =

Romanian footballer (1949–2025)

Personal information
- Date of birth: 20 November 1949
- Place of birth: Bucharest, Romania
- Date of death: 9 January 2025 (aged 75)
- Height: 1.78 m (5 ft 10 in)
- Position: Defender

Youth career
- 1964–1969: Steaua București

Senior career*
Years	Team	Apps	(Gls)
1969–1974	Steaua București	86	(0)
1974–1975	FC Brașov	26	(0)
1975–1977	Sportul Studențesc București	53	(0)
1977–1980	Progresul București	64	(1)
1981–1982	DS'79	23	(2)
1982–1983	Makedonikos	18	(0)
1984–1986	New York Croatia	40	(3)
Total		310	(6)

International career
1970–1976	Romania U23	10	(0)
1976–1977	Romania B	3	(0)
- * Club domestic league appearances and goals

Marius Ciugarin (20 November 1949 – 9 January 2025) was a Romanian footballer who played as a defender. He died on 9 January 2025, at the age of 75.

== Honours ==
Steaua București

- Cupa României: 1969–70, 1970–71

New York Croatia

- Cosmopolitan Soccer League: 1985–86
