= 1970–71 Divizia A =

53rd season of top-tier football league in Romania

Divizia A
- Season: 1970–71
- Champions: Dinamo București
- Top goalscorer: Florea Dumitrache; Constantin Moldoveanu; Gheorghe Tătaru (15)

The 1970–71 Divizia A was the fifty-third season of Divizia A, the top-level football league of Romania.

== Teams ==
Location of teams in 1970-71 Divizia A

== League table ==
Pos	Team	Pld	W	D	L	GF	GA	GD	Pts	Qualification or relegation
1	Dinamo București (C)	30	13	10	7	49	31	+18	36	Qualification to European Cup first round
2	Rapid București	30	12	11	7	35	25	+10	35	Qualification to UEFA Cup first round
3	Steaua București	30	11	11	8	46	31	+15	33	Qualification to Cup Winners' Cup first round
4	UTA Arad	30	14	5	11	49	35	+14	33	Qualification to UEFA Cup first round
5	Steagul Roşu Brașov	30	13	7	10	32	29	+3	33	Invitation to Balkans Cup
6	Universitatea Craiova	30	12	8	10	29	32	−3	32	
7	Petrolul Ploiești	30	10	11	9	33	35	−2	31	
8	Politehnica Iași	30	13	4	13	50	41	+9	30	
9	Argeș Pitești	30	11	8	11	41	44	−3	30	
10	Dinamo Bacău	30	13	4	13	37	41	−4	30	
11	Farul Constanța	30	11	8	11	39	45	−6	30	
12	Universitatea Cluj	30	10	9	11	36	35	+1	29	
13	Jiul Petroșani	30	12	4	14	28	35	−7	28	
14	CFR Cluj	30	9	8	13	37	52	−15	26	
15	Progresul București (R)	30	8	9	13	34	39	−5	25	Relegation to Divizia B
16	CFR Timișoara (R)	30	7	5	18	21	46	−25	19	Relegation to Divizia B

Source: LT
Rules for classification: 1) points; 2) goal difference; 3) number of goals scored
(C) Champions; (R) Relegated

=== Results ===
Home \ Away	ARG	BAC	CFR	CFT	UCR	DIN	FAR	JIU	PET	PIA	PRO	RAP	SRB	STE	UTA	UCL
Argeș Pitești	—	4–1	4–1	3–1	1–0	1–1	2–1	1–0	2–0	2–2	3–0	2–0	0–1	0–0	4–1	1–1
Bacău	3–0	—	0–0	1–0	3–1	1–1	2–1	2–0	5–0	2–0	2–0	1–0	1–0	0–2	1–0	2–0
CFR Cluj	2–2	2–1	—	3–1	0–0	0–1	3–3	0–0	3–2	2–4	1–0	3–1	3–2	5–0	2–2	2–1
CFR Timișoara	0–2	2–0	0–1	—	0–1	1–2	0–0	1–2	1–0	2–1	2–1	1–3	0–0	0–0	2–0	2–1
Universitatea Craiova	1–0	2–0	1–1	1–1	—	1–0	3–1	1–0	1–1	1–0	3–3	1–0	1–0	0–2	1–0	1–1
Dinamo București	1–1	2–1	4–0	2–0	1–2	—	4–1	4–0	2–2	1–3	1–2	1–1	4–4	3–0	4–1	2–1
Farul Constanța	1–1	4–2	2–0	2–1	2–0	2–1	—	1–0	1–1	2–1	2–1	1–4	1–0	2–1	0–2	2–0
Jiul Petroșani	4–1	1–0	2–0	2–1	1–0	2–0	2–0	—	2–0	2–0	3–1	0–2	2–1	1–1	0–2	0–0
Petrolul Ploiești	2–0	2–0	2–1	1–1	3–1	2–1	1–1	1–0	—	3–1	1–1	0–0	4–0	1–1	1–1	1–0
Politehnica Iași	2–0	3–1	2–0	1–0	2–0	0–0	3–2	6–1	3–0	—	1–1	0–0	0–1	2–0	4–1	4–2
Progresul București	2–2	3–1	1–0	0–1	1–0	0–0	0–0	0–0	0–1	4–2	—	0–1	2–0	1–1	1–2	4–1
Rapid București	1–1	0–1	3–1	3–0	1–1	1–1	2–2	1–0	1–0	2–1	2–0	—	1–3	0–0	1–0	1–0
Steagul Roşu Brașov	3–0	0–0	1–0	1–0	1–0	0–0	2–0	1–0	2–0	2–0	1–3	1–1	—	2–1	0–0	0–1
Steaua București	5–1	4–2	6–0	4–0	1–1	0–1	0–0	2–0	0–0	3–1	2–2	1–1	1–2	—	3–0	3–1
UTA Arad	6–1	6–0	3–0	6–0	0–2	0–2	3–0	2–1	2–0	2–0	2–0	1–1	3–1	1–0	—	0–0
Universitatea Cluj	1–0	1–1	1–1	2–0	5–1	2–2	3–2	3–0	1–1	2–0	1–0	1–0	0–0	0–2	3–0	—

Source: LT (in Romanian)
Legend: Blue = home team win; Yellow = draw; Red = away team win.

== Top goalscorers ==
Rank	Player	Club	Goals
1	Florea Dumitrache	Dinamo București	15
1	Constantin Moldoveanu	Politehnica Iași	15
1	Gheorghe Tătaru	Steaua București	15
4	Constantin Frățilă	Argeș Pitești	13
5	Mihai Adam	Universitatea Cluj	12
5	Anghel Iordănescu	Steaua București	12
5	Alexandru Neagu	Rapid București	12
5	Ion Oblemenco	Universitatea Craiova	12

== Champion squad ==
Dinamo București

Goalkeepers: Mircea Constantinescu (27 / 0); Marin Andrei (4 / 0); Iosif Cavai (1 / 0).
Defenders: Florin Cheran (27 / 1); Ion Nunweiller (20 / 0); Mircea Stoenescu (20 / 0); Cornel Dinu (24 / 4); Gabriel Sandu (9 / 0); Augustin Deleanu (27 / 3); Constantin Ștefan (8 / 0); Nicolae Petre (2 / 0).
Midfielders: Viorel Sălceanu (26 / 8); Alexandru Mustățea (18 / 0); Radu Nunweiller (30 / 5).
Forwards: Alexandru Moldovan (12 / 0); Petre Nuțu (12 / 0); Florea Dumitrache (28 / 15); Mircea Lucescu (23 / 3); Gavril Both (10 / 1); Doru Popescu (22 / 7); Ion Haidu (14 / 2); Ion Moț (3 / 0).
(league appearances and goals listed in brackets)

Manager: Nicolae Dumitru & *Traian Ionescu.

- Traian Ionescu coached only in the second half

== See also ==
- 1970–71 Divizia B
- 1970–71 Divizia C
- 1970–71 County Championship
