= 1969–70 Cupa României =

Tournament details
- Country: Romania

Final positions
- Champions: Steaua București
- Runners-up: Dinamo București

The 1969–70 Cupa României was the 32nd edition of Romania's most prestigious football cup competition.

The title was won by Steaua București against Dinamo București.

== Format ==
The competition is an annual knockout tournament.

In the first round proper, two pots were made, first pot with Divizia A teams and other teams till 16 and the second pot with the rest of teams qualified in this phase. Each tie is played as a single leg.

First round proper matches are played on the ground of the lowest ranked team, then from the second round proper the matches are played on a neutral location.

In the first round proper, if a match is drawn after 90 minutes, the game goes in extra time, and if the scored is still tight after 120 minutes, the team who played away will qualify.

From the second round proper, if a match is drawn after 90 minutes, the game goes in extra time, and if the scored is still tight after 120 minutes, then the team from the lower division will qualify. If the teams are from the same division a replay will be played.

From the first edition, the teams from Divizia A entered in competition in sixteen finals, rule which remained till today.

== Bracket ==
Round of 32
Sportul Studențesc	1
ASA Crişul Oradea	0
Rulmentul Bârlad	0
Steaua București	4
Metalul București	0
UTA Arad (a.e.t.)	1
Portul Constanța	0
ASA 1962 Târgu Mureș	1
Minerul Moldova Nouă	1
Argeș Pitești	2
Metalul Turnu Severin (a.e.t.)	5
CFR Cluj	2
Chimia Râmnicu Vâlcea	0
Farul Constanța	1
CFR Paşcani	2
Universitatea Craiova	1
Politehnica Timișoara	0
Dinamo București	1
Tractorul Brașov	3
Politehnica Iași	1
CIL Gherla	4
Rapid București	3
Minerul Ghelar	0
Jiul Petroşani (a.e.t.)	0
CSM Sibiu	2
Universitatea Cluj	3
Victoria Moreni	0
Steagul Roşu Braşov	4
Minaur Zlatna	1
Petrolul Ploiești (a.e.t.)	2
Victoria Roman	1
Dinamo Bacău	2

Round of 16
Sportul Studențesc	1
Steaua București	4
UTA Arad (a.e.t.)	1
ASA 1962 Târgu Mureș	0
Argeș Pitești	3
Metalul Turnu Severin	1
Farul Constanța	3
CFR Paşcani	1
Dinamo București	3
Tractorul Brașov	0
CIL Gherla	1
Jiul Petroşani (a.e.t.)	2
Universitatea Cluj	1
Steagul Roşu Braşov	2
Petrolul Ploiești	2
Dinamo Bacău	0

Quarter-finals
Steaua București	1
UTA Arad	0
Argeș Pitești (a.e.t.)	0
Farul Constanța	0
Dinamo București	2
Jiul Petroşani	1
Steagul Roşu Braşov	4
Petrolul Ploiești	2

Semi-finals
Steaua București	3
Argeș Pitești	1
Dinamo București	3
Steagul Roşu Braşov	1

Final
Steaua București	2
Dinamo București	1

== First round proper ==
Team 1	Score	Team 2
16 May 1970
Sportul Studențesc București (Div. B)	1–0	(Div. A) ASA Crişul Oradea
17 May 1970
Rulmentul Bârlad (Div. C)	0–4	(Div. A) Steaua București
Tractorul Brașov (Div. C)	3–1	(Div. A) Politehnica Iași
Metalul București (Div. B)	0–1 (a.e.t.)	(Div. A) UTA Arad
Minerul Ghelar (Div. C)	0–0 (a.e.t.)	(Div. A) Jiul Petroşani
Minerul Moldova Nouă (Div. D)	1–2	(Div. A) Argeș Pitești
Victoria Moreni (Div. D)	0–4	(Div. A) Steagul Roşu Braşov
CFR Paşcani (Div. C)	2–1	(Div. A) Universitatea Craiova
Chimia Râmnicu Vâlcea (Div. B)	0–1	(Div. A) Farul Constanța
Victoria Roman (Div. C)	1–2	(Div. A) Dinamo Bacău
Politehnica Timișoara (Div. B)	0–1	(Div. A) Dinamo București
24 May 1970
Portul Constanța (Div. B)	0–1	(Div. A) ASA 1962 Târgu Mureș
CSM Sibiu (Div. B)	2–3	(Div. A) Universitatea Cluj
Metalul Turnu Severin (Div. B)	5–2 (a.e.t.)	(Div. A) CFR Cluj
25 May 1970
Minaur Zlatna (Div. C)	1–2 (a.e.t.)	(Div. A) Petrolul Ploiești
27 May 1970
CIL Gherla (Div. C)	4–3	(Div. A) Rapid București

== Second round proper ==
Team 1	Score	Team 2
30 May 1970
Sportul Studențesc București	1–4	Steaua București
Universitatea Cluj	1–2	Steagul Roşu Braşov
31 May 1970
Petrolul Ploiești	2–0	Dinamo Bacău
CIL Gherla	1–2 (a.e.t.)	Jiul Petroşani
Dinamo București	3–0	Tractorul Brașov
UTA Arad	1–0 (a.e.t.)	ASA 1962 Târgu Mureș
Argeș Pitești	3–1	Metalul Turnu Severin
Farul Constanța	3–1	CFR Paşcani

== Quarter-finals ==
Team 1	Score	Team 2
13 June 1970
Dinamo București	2–1	Jiul Petroşani
17 June 1970
Argeș Pitești ‡	0–0 (a.e.t.)	Farul Constanța
18 June 1970
Steagul Roşu Braşov	4–2	Petrolul Ploiești
20 June 1970
Steaua București	1–0	UTA Arad

Notes:

- ‡ Because the lack of time in the competition format, no replay were played, Argeș Pitești won after coin toss and qualified in the Semi-finals.

== Semi-finals ==
Team 1	Score	Team 2
24 June 1970
Dinamo București	3–1	Steagul Roşu Braşov
Steaua București	3–1	Argeș Pitești

== Final ==
26 July 1970
17:30 EET

Steaua București	2–1	Dinamo București
Voinea 7', 56'	Report	Dumitrache 79'

23 August, Bucharest
Attendance: 30,000
Referee: Gheorghe Limona (Bucharest)
