= Florea Dumitrache =

Romanian professional footballer

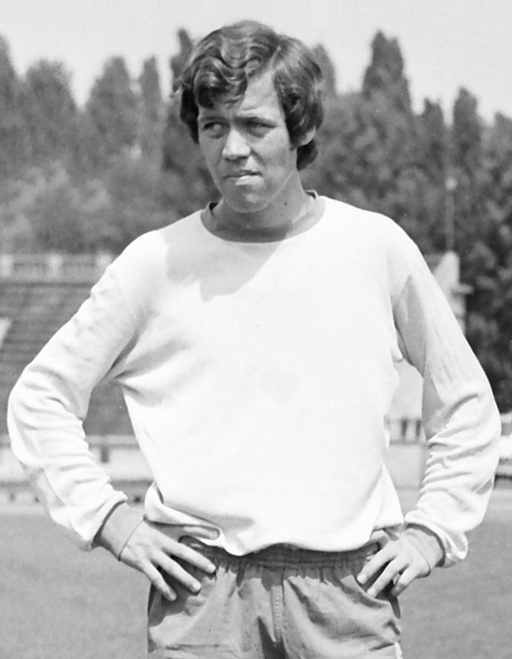
- Dumitrache with Dinamo București

Personal information
- Full name: Florea Dumitrache
- Date of birth: 22 May 1948
- Place of birth: Bucharest, Romania
- Date of death: 26 April 2007 (aged 59)
- Place of death: Bucharest, Romania
- Height: 1.74 m (5 ft 9 in)
- Position: Striker

Youth career
- 1961–1963: Rapid București
- 1963–1964: TUG București
- 1964–1965: Dinamo București

Senior career*
Years	Team	Apps	(Gls)
1965–1976	Dinamo București	208	(115)
1976–1979	Jiul Petroșani	80	(37)
1979–1983	Corvinul Hunedoara	103	(42)
1983–1984	Minerul Știința Vulcan		
Total		381	(185)

International career
1968–1974	Romania	31	(15)
- * Club domestic league appearances and goals

Florea Dumitrache (22 May 1948 – 26 April 2007) was a Romanian professional footballer who played as a striker.

Dumitrache spent most of his senior career at Dinamo București, appearing in over 200 league matches and winning three national titles and one national cup. Internationally, he earned 31 caps for the Romania national team and scored 15 goals.

He was considered one of the best forwards in Europe during his time, and was well known for his technique and aerial ability.

Italian club Juventus wanted to sign Dumitrache after his performance at the 1970 World Cup but Nicolae Ceaușescu's communist regime refused.

== Club career ==
Dumitrache was born on 22 May 1948 in Bucharest, Romania, having been nicknamed since his childhood "Mopsul" (The Pug), because his nose resembled that of a pug. He started playing junior-level football in 1961 at Rapid București. Two years later he went to TUG Bucureșt, where he was seen by Dinamo București's coach Traian Ionescu who convinced him to come and play for his team. He made his Divizia A debut on 2 May 1966, playing for Dinamo București under coach Angelo Niculescu in a 1–1 draw against Dinamo Pitești. His first trophy won was the 1967–68 Cupa României, scoring a goal in the 3–1 victory in the final against Rapid in which coach Bazil Marian used him the entire match. In the following three editions of the Cupa României, the team would reach the final in all of them, Dumitrache scoring a goal in each of the first two, but they were all lost to rivals Steaua București. Over the years he would score five more goals in the derby against Steaua in five league victories.

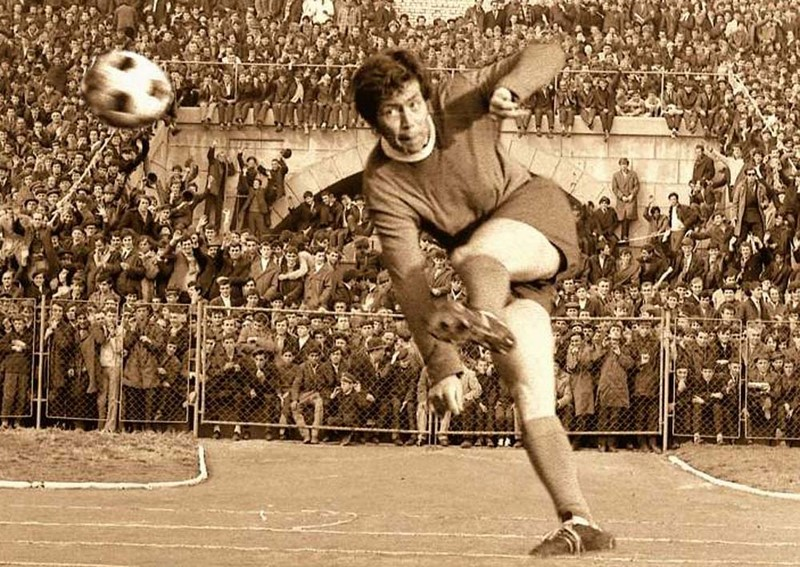
Dumitrache in action for Dinamo București

Dumitrache won three league titles with The Red Dogs in 1971, 1973 and 1975. In the first one he contributed with 15 goals scored in the 28 matches he was used by coaches Nicolae Dumitru and Ionescu. In the second he played 26 games and scored 15 goals under the guidance of Ion Nunweiller and in the third he made 10 appearances with four goals netted while working once again with Dumitru. During his time at Dinamo, Dumitrache also played 16 games and scored six goals in European competitions. Notably, he netted once in a 11–0 win over Crusaders in the 1973–74 European Cup and helped the team earn a 1–0 home win over Real Madrid in the 1975–76 European Cup. He became the Divizia A top-scorer twice, first in 1969 with 22 goals and the second in 1971, alongside Constantin Moldoveanu and Gheorghe Tătaru with 15 goals. Dumitrache won two times (1968, 1969) the Romanian Footballer of the Year award, and in 1970, he was nominated for the Ballon d'Or along with Dinamo teammate Cornel Dinu. Italian club Juventus wanted to sign the 24-year-old Dumitrache after his performance in the 1970 World Cup, making an estimated $1.5 million offer for him, but Nicolae Ceaușescu's communist regime refused.

In 1976, after spending 11 seasons at Dinamo, Dumitrache joined Jiul Petroșani, where for three seasons he made a successful partnership in the team's offence with Gheorghe Mulțescu. He netted 20 goals in his first season, being the league's second top-scorer, only behind former teammate, Dinamo's Dudu Georgescu who won the European Golden Shoe. Jiul reached the 1977–78 Balkans Cup final, with Dumitrache playing in the second leg of the 4–2 aggregate defeat to Rijeka. In 1979, he went to Divizia B club, Corvinul Hunedoara where his former Dinamo teammate, Mircea Lucescu was coaching, scoring 15 goals in his first season which helped the club earn promotion to the first league. In the 1981–82 Divizia A season, the team finished third. Subsequently, Dumitrache played all four games in Corvinul's 1982–83 UEFA Cup campaign, scoring once as they got past Grazer AK in the first round, being eliminated in the following one by FK Sarajevo against whom he also netted a goal. During the second leg against Sarajevo, an incident occurred where he headbutted referee Gianfranco Menegali in the mouth and as a consequence, UEFA handed him the maximum seven year suspension from all its competitions. Dumitrache made his last Divizia A appearance on 17 September 1983 in Corvinul's 2–0 home loss to his former team, Jiul Petroșani, totaling 357 matches with 170 goals in the competition. He ended his career in 1984 after playing for Minerul Știința Vulcan.

== International career ==
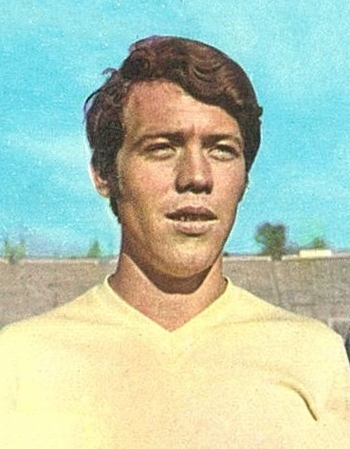
Dumitrache with Romania

Dumitrache played 31 games and scored 15 goals for Romania, making his debut under coach Angelo Niculescu in a 0–0 friendly draw against the Netherlands. He played five games in which he scored three goals in the successful 1970 World Cup qualifiers. He performed well in the final tournament, being used by coach Niculescu in all three group stage games, scoring twice, once in a 2–1 win over Czechoslovakia and once in a 3–2 loss to Brazil. Dumitrache also impressed with his dribbling abilities, especially in the 1–0 loss to England in front of defenders Bobby Moore and Terry Cooper. However, Romania did not manage to advance to the next stage. He played three matches and scored two goals in the Euro 1972 qualifiers. Then he scored five goals in five games during the 1974 World Cup qualifiers, including two in Romania's biggest ever victory, a 9–0 win against Finland. Dumitrache also played in a 3–1 win over Greece in the 1973–76 Balkan Cup, making his last appearance for the national team on 23 July 1974 in a 4–1 friendly victory against Japan in which he scored two goals.

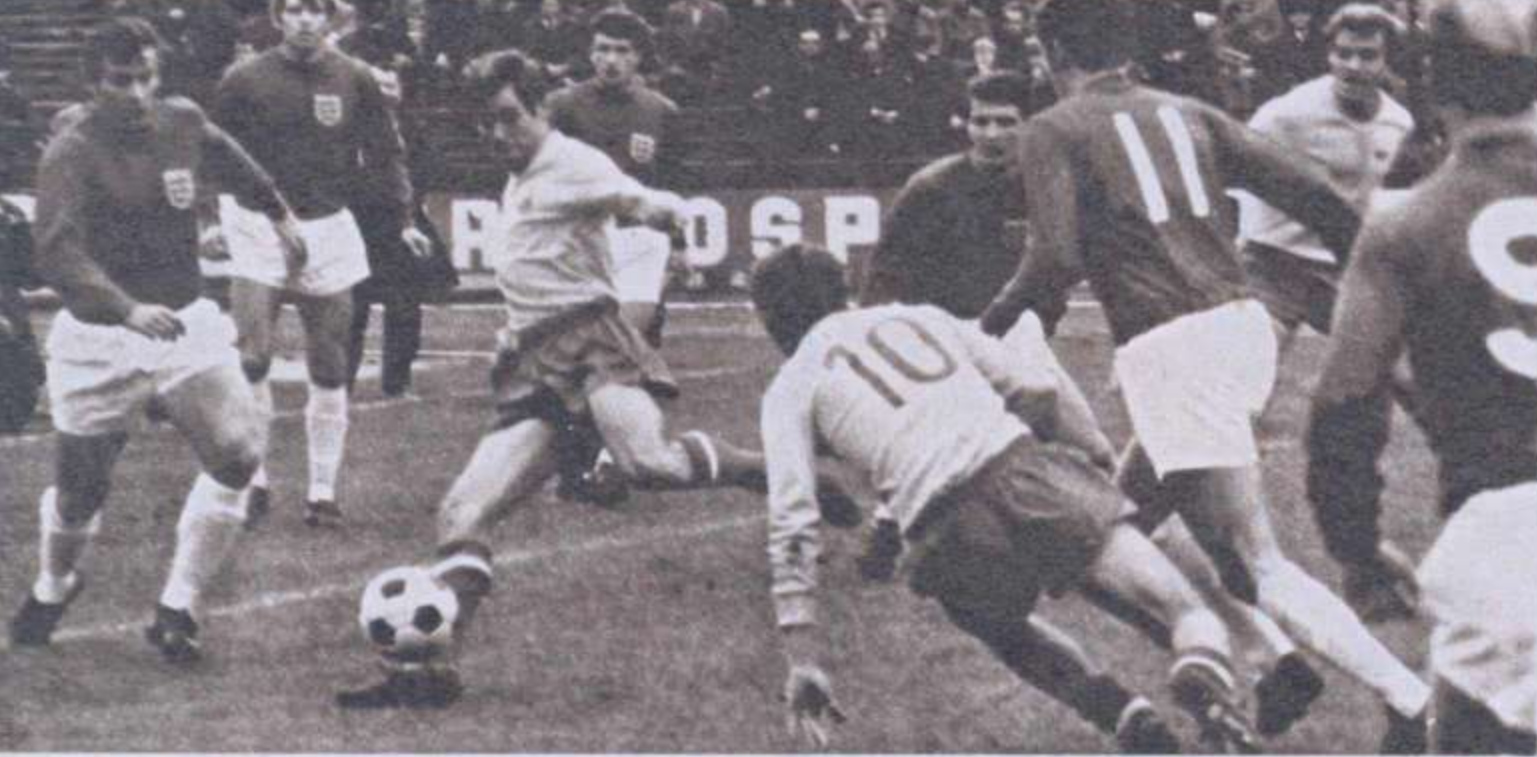
Dumitrache on the ball in a friendly against England in 1968.

In 2022, the International Federation of Football History & Statistics (IFFHS) included Dumitrache in its "Romania's all-time dream team" first XI.

=== International goals ===
Scores and results list Romania's goal tally first, score column indicates score after each Dumitrache goal:

List of international goals scored by Florea Dumitrache
#	Date	Venue	Opponent	Score	Result	Competition
1	23 November 1968	23 August Stadium, Bucharest, Romania	Switzerland	1–0	2–0	1970 FIFA World Cup Qual.
2	15 January 1969	Wembley Stadium, London, England	England	1–1	1–1	Friendly match
3	16 April 1969	Karaiskakis Stadium, Piraeus, Greece	Greece	1–1	2–2	1970 FIFA World Cup Qual.
4	16 April 1969	Karaiskakis Stadium, Piraeus, Greece	Greece	2–2	2–2	1970 FIFA World Cup Qual.
5	6 June 1970	Estadio Jalisco, Guadalajara, Mexico	Czechoslovakia	2–1	2–1	1970 FIFA World Cup
6	10 June 1970	Estadio Jalisco, Guadalajara, Mexico	Brazil	1–2	2–3	1970 FIFA World Cup
7	11 October 1970	23 August Stadium, Bucharest, Romania	Finland	1–0	3–0	UEFA Euro 1972 Qual.
8	11 October 1970	23 August Stadium, Bucharest, Romania	Finland	2–0	3–0	UEFA Euro 1972 Qual.
9	6 May 1973	Qemal Stafa Stadium, Tirana, Albania	Albania	2–0	4–1	1974 FIFA World Cup Qual.
10	6 May 1973	Qemal Stafa Stadium, Tirana, Albania	Albania	3–0	4–1	1974 FIFA World Cup Qual.
11	27 May 1973	23 August Stadium, Bucharest, Romania	East Germany	1–0	1–0	1974 FIFA World Cup Qual.
12	14 October 1973	23 August Stadium, Bucharest, Romania	Finland	5–0	9–0	1974 FIFA World Cup Qual.
13	14 October 1973	23 August Stadium, Bucharest, Romania	Finland	7–0	9–0	1974 FIFA World Cup Qual.
14	23 July 1974	Stadion 1 Mai, Constanța, Romania	Japan	1–0	4–1	Friendly match
15	23 July 1974	Stadion 1 Mai, Constanța, Romania	Japan	2–0	4–1	Friendly match

== Personal life and death ==
Sports commentator Ilie Dobre published a book about his career titled I se spune "Mopsul" - Florea Dumitrache (They call him "Pug" - Florea Dumitrache), which was released in 2001.

Dumitrache died in his native Bucharest on 26 April 2007, aged 59, due to a digestive hemorrhage. After his death, the Victoria Ground was renamed "Stadionul Florea Dumitrache" in his honor.

== Honours ==
Dinamo București

- Divizia A: 1970–71, 1972–73, 1974–75
- Cupa României: 1967–68

Jiul Petroșani

- Balkans Cup runner-up: 1977–78

Corvinul Hunedoara

- Divizia B: 1979–80

Individual

- Divizia A top scorer: 1968–69, 1970–71
- Romanian Footballer of the Year: 1968, 1969
- Ballon d'Or 24th place: 1970
