= Traian Ionescu =

Romanian footballer and manager

Trăian Ionescu
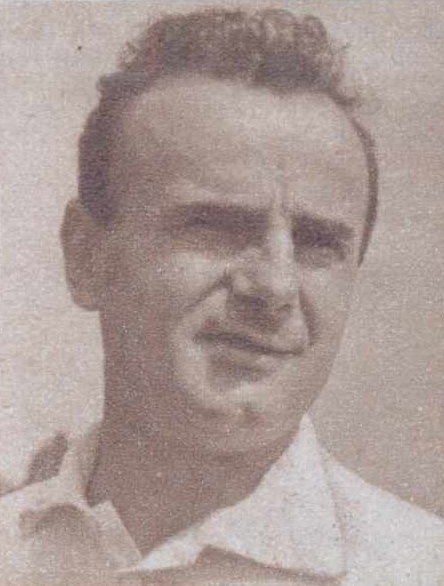
- Ionescu in 1963

Personal information
- Full name: Trăian Ionescu
- Date of birth: 17 July 1923
- Place of birth: Văleni, Argeș County, Romania
- Date of death: 4 October 2006 (aged 83)
- Place of death: București, Romania
- Position: Goalkeeper

Youth career
- 1936–1939: TC Târgoviște

Senior career*
Years	Team	Apps	(Gls)
1939–1941	Sporting Club Pitești		
1943–1945	Vulturii Textila Lugoj		
1945–1946	Sportul Muncitoresc Găvana		
1946–1949	Juventus București	42	(0)
1949–1951	CCA București	36	(0)
1952	CA Câmpulung Moldovenesc	11	(0)
Total		89	(0)

International career
1948–1949	Romania	5	(0)

Managerial career
- 1952: Casa Armatei Craiova
- 1952–1957: Flacăra Ploiești (youth)
- 1959–1962: Dinamo București
- 1963–1964: Dinamo București
- 1965–1967: Dinamo București
- 1969–1970: Fenerbahçe
- 1971: Dinamo București
- 1971–1972: Dinamo București (technical director)
- 1973–1975: Sportul Studențesc București
- 1975–1976: Olimpia Satu Mare
- 1977–1978: Jiul Petroșani
- 1978–1980: SC Bacău
- 1980–1981: Petrolul Ploiești
- 1981: Steaua București
- 1982: Chimia Râmnicu Vâlcea
- 1983–1984: Morocco Olympic team
- 1984–1985: Olt Scornicești
- 1987–1989: CSM Reșița
- * Club domestic league appearances and goals

Traian Ionescu (17 July 1923 – 4 October 2006) was a Romanian football goalkeeper and coach.

== Club career ==
Ionescu was born on 17 July 1923 in Văleni, Argeș County, Romania and began playing junior-level football at age 13 at TC Târgoviște where he stayed until 1939. In the following years he went to play for Sporting Club Pitești, Vulturii Textila Lugoj and Sportul Muncitoresc Găvana. He arrived at Juventus București where coach Emerich Vogl gave him his Divizia A debut on 6 April 1947 in a 4–1 victory against Libertatea Oradea. In 1949, Ionescu was transferred by CCA București where he helped the team win its first title in the 1951 season, being used by coach Gheorghe Popescu in five games. He also contributed to three Cupa României victories, but played in only one final in 1949 when coach Francisc Ronnay used him the entire match in the 2–1 victory against CSU Cluj. Ionescu went to play for CA Câmpulung Moldovenesc where he made his last Divizia A appearance on 27 November 1952 in a 3–0 home victory against Flacăra Petroșani, totaling 98 games in the competition.

== International career ==
Ionescu played five games for Romania, making his debut on 20 June 1948 under coach Iuliu Baratky in a 3–2 home victory against Bulgaria in the 1948 Balkan Cup. His following two games were in the same tournament, a 2–1 win over Czechoslovakia and a 0–0 draw against Poland. Ionescu's last appearance for the national team took place on 22 May 1949 in a 3–2 friendly loss to Czechoslovakia.

== Managerial career ==
"Traian Ionescu was unique, one of the greatest Romanian football coaches."

— Cornel Dinu, former Dinamo player

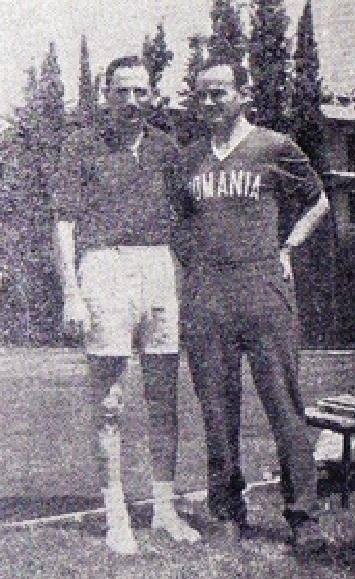
Ionescu (pictured, right) and Silvio Piola (left) at the Coverciano training center in 1965.

Ionescu started his coaching career at Divizia C team, Casa Armatei Craiovei, which shortly after his appointment had dissolved. Subsequently, he worked as a youth coach at Flacăra Ploiești, where he discovered talents such as Mircea Dridea, Vasile Sfetcu and Constantin Tabarcea, reaching the 1957 national junior championship final which was lost to Universitatea Cluj.

Ionescu went on to coach the senior squad of Dinamo București, where he demonstrated a remarkable ability to discover and promote young talent. Among the notable players he developed was Ion Pârcălab, who, after being transferred from UTA Arad, evolved into one of Europe's premier forwards. He also recognized Mircea Lucescu playing football on a gravel field and noticed Cornel Dinu during a Metalul Târgoviște match against Dinamo in the quarter-finals of the 1964–65 Cupa României. Furthermore, he decided to transfer 16-year-old Florea Dumitrache after observing him for only ten minutes in a junior-level football game at TUG București. Other significant players he coached at Dinamo included Constantin Frățilă, Ilie Datcu, Gabriel Sandu, Florin Cheran, and Alexandru Sătmăreanu. These individuals, along with others he coached such as Ion Nunweiller, Lică Nunweiller, and Gheorghe Ene, became important members of Romania's national team throughout the 1960s and 1970s. In his spells with The Red Dogs, Ionescu helped the team win four Divizia A titles and one Cupa României after a 5–3 victory in the final against rivals Steaua București. During some of his years spent at Dinamo, Ionescu co-coached the team alongside Angelo Niculescu and Nicolae Dumitru. His first continental success was helping the club get past East German champions Motor Jena to reach the round of 16 in the 1963–64 European Cup campaign. One of his most important European achievements was the historical 2–1 win over Helenio Herrera's Inter Milan in the 1965–66 European Cup edition, the Italians being the winners of the previous two seasons of the competition. Ionescu said after the game:"Our boys have proven once again that when they give it their all, they can achieve extraordinary results." However, they lost the second leg with 2–0.

He had his first coaching experience outside Romania in Turkey at Fenerbahçe with whom he won the 1969–70 Turkish League and a TSYD Cup together with his former Dinamo players, Ion Nunweiller and Ilie Datcu. Ionescu also worked at Sportul Studențesc București, Olimpia Satu Mare, Jiul Petroșani—with which he reached the 1977–78 Balkans Cup final—SC Bacău, Petrolul Ploiești, Steaua București, Chimia Râmnicu Vâlcea, Olt Scornicești and CSM Reșița. He also had a second coaching experience outside Romania at Morocco's Olympic team from 1983 until 1984. Ionescu had a total of 287 matches as manager in Divizia A, consisting of 128 victories, 70 draws and 89 losses.

== Death ==
Ionescu died on 4 October 2006 at age 83 in București.

== Honours ==
=== Player ===
CCA București

- Divizia A: 1951
- Cupa României: 1948–49, 1950, 1951

=== Manager ===
Dinamo București

- Divizia A: 1961–62, 1962–63, 1963–64, 1970–71
- Cupa României: 1963–64

Fenerbahçe

- Turkish League: 1969–70
- TSYD Cup: 1969–70

Jiul Petroșani

- Balkans Cup runner-up: 1977–78
