= Cornel Dinu =

Romanian professional footballer and manager

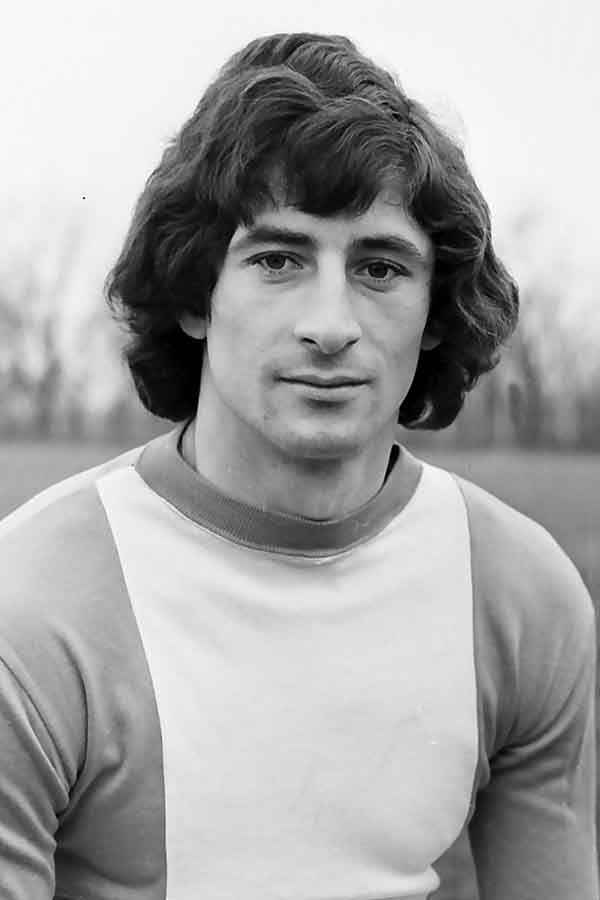
- Dinu with Dinamo București in the 1970s

Personal information
- Date of birth: 2 August 1948 (age 78)
- Place of birth: Târgoviște, Romania
- Height: 1.78 m (5 ft 10 in)
- Positions: Sweeper; defensive midfielder

Youth career
- 1963–1965: Metalul Târgoviște

Senior career*
Years	Team	Apps	(Gls)
1965–1966	Metalul Târgoviște		
1966–1983	Dinamo București	454	(53)
Total		454	(53)

International career
1968–1981	Romania	67	(3)

Managerial career
- 1983–1984: Dinamo București (assistant)
- 1984–1985: Dinamo București
- 1985–1987: CS Târgoviște
- 1987–1988: ASA Târgu Mureș
- 1988: Oțelul Galați
- 1989: Universitatea Cluj
- 1989–1990: Olt Scornicești
- 1992–1993: Romania
- 1996: Dinamo București (caretaker)
- 1998–2001: Dinamo București
- 2002–2003: Dinamo București
- 2013–: Dinamo București (board member)
- * Club domestic league appearances and goals

Cornel Dinu (born 2 August 1948) is a Romanian retired professional footballer and manager who played as a sweeper or a defensive midfielder.

He started out his playing career at hometown club Metalul Târgoviște in 1965, and went on to spend the rest of his career at Dinamo București where he won eight domestic trophies. Internationally, Dinu appeared in over 60 matches for Romania's national team and scored three goals. He was named the Romanian Footballer of the Year three times, in 1970, 1972 and 1974, and in the former year also finished on the 24th place in the Ballon d'Or voting.

After retiring as a player, Dinu coached Dinamo București on five occasions among other stints, initially in the role of an assistant. Between 1992 and 1993, he was at the helm of the Romania national team.

== Club career ==
"Cornel Dinu, the serious player, who never smiles and maybe that's why he doesn't tremble in front of anyone, even if he has to face an entire stadium. For him, football was never just a game."

— Journalist Ioan Chirilă's words about Dinu in 1974

Dinu was born on 2 August 1948 in Târgoviște, Romania to a Romanian father from Bârlad who worked as a magistrate, lawyer and doctor of law, and a Serbian mother from Târgoviște who worked as an economist. He began playing football in 1963 for the junior teams of Metalul Târgoviște under coaches Eugen Popescu and Gheorghe Ticușan. His talent was noticed by Rudolf Wetzer, the counselor of head coach Gheorghe Nuțescu, who promoted him to the senior squad. He made his debut for the seniors on 17 March 1965 in a 1–0 victory, in which he gave the assist of the goal against UTA Arad in the 1964–65 Cupa României. Dinu also played in the subsequent Cupa României quarter-final match against Dinamo București, which resulted in a 5–0 loss. During this game, Dinamo's officials noticed him, and he was later brought to the club at the request of coach Traian Ionescu.

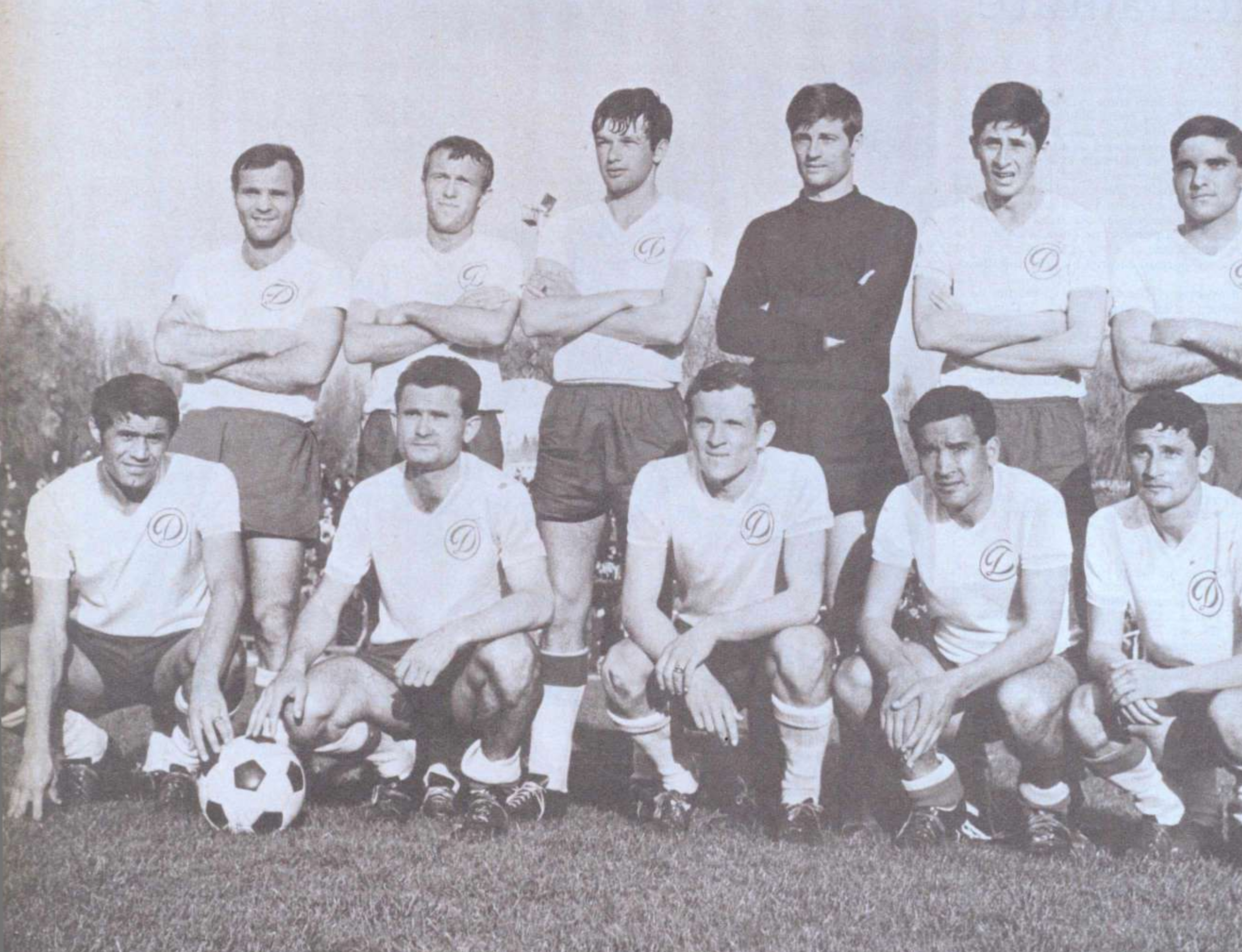
Dinu (back row, second from the right) with Dinamo București in 1968

Dinu debuted for Dinamo in Divizia A under Traian Ionescu on 25 September 1966 in a 1–0 loss to Steagul Roșu Brașov. He remained at Dinamo throughout his career, winning six Divizia A titles, a competition in which he made 454 appearances (with only one appearance as a substitute) and scored 53 goals, also winning two Cupa României. Those 454 matches made him Dinamo's all-time appearance leader in Romania's top-division. He played 33 games in which he scored three goals in European competitions, including appearing in both legs of Dinamo's 4–3 aggregate victory against his childhood favorite team, Inter Milan in the 1981–82 UEFA Cup. Dinu graduated from Faculty of Law at the University of Bucharest in 1972, which earned him the nickname "Procurorul" (The Prosecutor). His last game played was a Divizia A match that took place on 18 June 1983 against Universitatea Craiova which ended in a 1–1 draw, being replaced by coach Nicolae Dumitru in the 25th minute with Nelu Stănescu due to an injury.

Dinu won three times (1970, 1972, 1974) the Romanian Footballer of the Year award, and in 1970 along with Dinamo teammate Florea Dumitrache he was nominated for the Ballon d'Or. In 1972, Romanian coach Ștefan Kovács, who was in charge of Ajax Amsterdam, said about him:"Cornel Dinu could have played at the great Ajax at any time! Why? He is the only Romanian player who has the spirit of total football". In 1979, Dinu had an offer from Bayern Munich which he refused, choosing to stay in Romania.

== International career ==
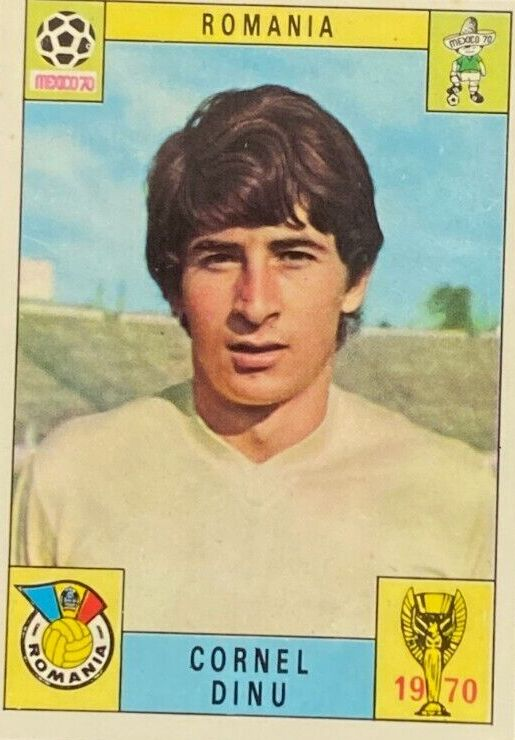
Dinu with Romania in 1970

Dinu played 67 matches and scored three goals for Romania (75/7 including Romania's Olympic team games), making his debut on 1 May 1968 under coach Angelo Niculescu in a 1–1 friendly draw against Austria. He played three games in the successful 1970 World Cup qualifiers. He was used in the final tournament by Niculescu for the entirety of all three games which were a win against Czechoslovakia and losses to England and Brazil, as his side failed to progress from their group. He played nine matches in the 1972 Euro qualifiers, managing to reach the quarter-finals where Romania was defeated by Hungary, who advanced to the final tournament. Dinu played five matches during the 1974 World Cup qualifiers, including as captain in Romania's biggest ever victory, a 9–0 win against Finland. He also appeared in a 3–1 victory and a 1–1 draw against Greece in the 1973–76 Balkan Cup and he scored a goal in a 6–1 win over Denmark during the Euro 1976 qualifiers where he played a total of five games. In his final years, Dinu made an appearance in the 1978 World Cup qualifiers, played two games in the Euro 1980 qualifiers and his last match for the national team was on 15 April 1981 in a 2–1 friendly loss to Denmark.

For representing his country at the 1970 World Cup, Dinu was decorated by President of Romania Traian Băsescu on 25 March 2008 with the Ordinul "Meritul Sportiv" – (The Medal "The Sportive Merit") class III. In 2022, the International Federation of Football History & Statistics (IFFHS) included Dinu in its "Romania's all-time dream team" first XI.

== Managerial career ==
After ending his playing career in 1983, Dinu became the assistant coach of Nicolae Dumitru at Dinamo București, managing to win the championship, the cup and reach the 1983–84 European Cup semi-finals. The following season he started his career as head coach at Dinamo. His biggest performances as manager were two championship titles and two cups with Dinamo, and also a 1–0 victory against Juventus Torino while coaching Oțelul Galați in the first round of the 1988–89 UEFA Cup, but he lost the second leg with 5–0. He also coached CS Târgoviște, ASA Târgu Mureș, Universitatea Cluj and Olt Scornicești, totaling 218 matches as a manager in the Romanian top-division, Divizia A consisting of 118 victories, 35 draws and 65 losses.

Dinu was also the head coach of Romania's national team from April 1992 until June 1993, having a total of 13 games (7 victories, 2 draws, 4 losses) including a 5–1 home victory against Wales and a 5–2 away loss to Czechoslovakia, both games in the 1994 World Cup qualifiers.

== After retirement ==
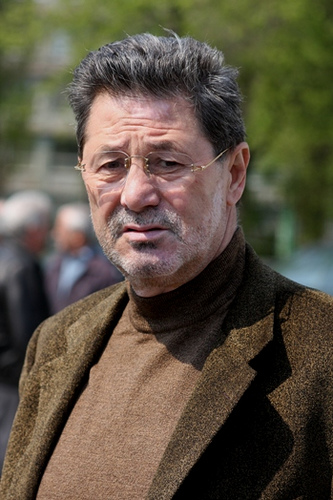
Dinu in April 2009

After he retired from his playing and coaching football career, Dinu worked in various management positions at Dinamo București. He was also a guest at various radio and television shows, with football and cultural themes. He received the Honorary Citizen of Târgoviște (2015) and Bucharest (2019) titles.

== Publishing ==
Dinu wrote sports columns in the magazine "Flacăra" and the daily "Scânteia tineretului" during Romania's communist era, and after 1989 in the newspapers "Sportul", "Gazeta Sporturilor", "Dimineața", "Gândul", "Național", "Adevărul", "Cultura" and "Fanatik". He also wrote a total of five volumes, two of them being about football and three autobiographical:

- Fotbal – Tactica astăzi (Football – The tactic of today) - co-written with Ion V. Ionescu (1977)
- Fotbal – Concepția de joc (Football - The concept of the game) - co-written with Ion V. Ionescu (1982)
- Zâmbind din iarbă (Smiling from the grass) - autobiographical novel (2007)
- Jucând cu destinul (Playing with destiny) - autobiographical novel (2008)
- Misterele lui Mister (The mysteries of Mister) - autobiographical novel (2019)

== Quotes ==
He is known for his original ironic comments by using metaphors, parables, quotes from historians, classical writers, and historical references:

- "A funny story. The first match was played in Belfast. I was not in the team. On the way back, a few colleagues said it was a very tough game, 1–0, the Northern Irish are very strong. They were given a bonus, good thing the matches weren't broadcast! When we played in the second leg, I yelled at them to shame them after about 20 minutes. Those guys had no idea about football. They were amateurs, these bearded guys, you had the feeling that they were something between guitarists and waiters. Pure amateurs!" – declaration years later after an 11–0 win over Crusaders in the 1973–74 European Cup in which he scored a goal.
- "Șumudică is a «vero» (n.r. true) Romanian. He combines the fantastic humor and the Romanian spirit very well. He has this spirit of treating phases with humor. His lines are very good. I don't know where he gets this humor from, he has it not only because he was born in the center of Bucharest, in Piața Romană, as he says. He has good quality sidewalk humor. He is not called Ninel for nothing. He is also called Marius, a Latin name. That was the name of Caesar's uncle, the general who fought the German savages head-to-head."
- "Worker Nicoliță, very hardworking, but the football field is not a construction site."
- "Philosophy is a transcendental propaedeutic for the death-haunted soul of the Romanian."
- "Pițurcă is like a Griffon dog that you have to knock off the forehead with a compass and a rake to see if it has a brain."
- "I started writing the fourth book. I generally write at night and sleep during the day. On the other hand, where should I go out? I apply the famous quote of Țuțea, "you have nothing to look for outside, there are too many imbeciles"."
- "Gnohéré looked like a simple Foreign Legion unit cook somewhere in Africa in an imaginary war."
- "This Rambé... I think his name is Ramble. The railway ramble where the train slows down so it doesn't derail."
- "I have a reserved opinion, in my opinion Peteleu is something between a cave and a cavern as a left defender. The poor guy has big problems!"
- "Matulevičius is good rather as a high voltage pole in the opposing box, maybe only to electrocute the opposing defenders."
- "Sânmărtean, considering how he plays in many phases when he won't finish the dribbles he starts at 30, 35 meters from the opposing goal. I have the feeling that he is a born tired player!"
- "Oroș, according to me, is a hole in Astra's indisputable defense! The way Oroș looks means that he eats well at Giurgiu, because he looks more like a rugby pillar. Don't you see how he looks?"
- "It was a mistake with the display of frankincense. Not in the locker room, not in the cells where the football parishioners stay. It had to start from the Palace, everything starts from there. Well, who brought players like Popescu or Oaidă? They are players without imagination, without technical ability. These players, after they pass the half court, you have to tell them to stop. But who will do this? The monks and prayer witnesses who sit next to Becali are not good at football."
- "A detective needs to find out what Dinamo is playing and how the players were placed on the field by Bonetti. When you make football players train by climbing the stairs, something that hasn't been done since Teașcă's time, what expectations do you have?! That's the basic training lately, ten stairs up, ten down! It's like those black guys who carried sacks of dirt on their backs in search of Tutankhamun's tomb."

== Career statistics ==
=== Club ===
Appearances and goals by club, season and competition
Club	Season	League			National Cup		Continental		Total	
Club	Season	Division	Apps	Goals	Apps	Goals	Apps	Goals	Apps	Goals
Metalul Târgoviște	1964–65	Divizia B			2	0	–		2	0
Metalul Târgoviște	1965–66	Divizia B					–			
Metalul Târgoviște	Total				2	0			2	0
Dinamo București	1966–67	Divizia A	16	0	2	0	–		18	0
Dinamo București	1967–68	Divizia A	26	6	5	0	–		31	6
Dinamo București	1968–69	Divizia A	30	6	5	2	2 (Note: Appearances in the UEFA Cup Winners' Cup)	0	37	8
Dinamo București	1969–70	Divizia A	23	4	2	0	–		27	4
Dinamo București	1970–71	Divizia A	24	4	6	0	4 (Note: Appearances in the UEFA Cup)	0	34	4
Dinamo București	1971–72	Divizia A	26	2	3	2	4 (Note: Appearances in the European Cup)	0	33	4
Dinamo București	1972–73	Divizia A	23	2	2	2	–		25	4
Dinamo București	1973–74	Divizia A	32	3	1	0	3	1	36	4
Dinamo București	1974–75	Divizia A	30	3	1	0	4	2	35	5
Dinamo București	1975–76	Divizia A	25	2	1	0	0	0	26	2
Dinamo București	1976–77	Divizia A	31	6	1	0	0	0	32	6
Dinamo București	1977–78	Divizia A	24	7	2	0	0	0	26	7
Dinamo București	1978–79	Divizia A	31	4	4	0	–		35	4
Dinamo București	1979–80	Divizia A	28	3	1	1	4	0	33	4
Dinamo București	1980–81	Divizia A	31	1	1	0	–		32	1
Dinamo București	1981–82	Divizia A	29	0	5	0	6	0	40	0
Dinamo București	1982–83	Divizia A	25	0	2	0	6	0	33	0
Dinamo București	Total		454	53	44	7	33	3	531	63
Career total			454	53	46	7	33	3	533	63

=== International ===
Appearances and goals by national team and year
National team	Year	Apps	Goals
Romania
Romania	1968	5	0
Romania	1969	7	0
Romania	1970	9	0
Romania	1971	5	0
Romania	1972	7	1
Romania	1973	4	0
Romania	1974	9	0
Romania	1975	9	2
Romania	1976	3	0
Romania	1977	1	0
Romania	1978	0	0
Romania	1980	2	0
Romania	1981	1	0
Total		67	3

Scores and results list Romania's goal tally first, score column indicates score after each Dinu goal.

List of international goals scored by Cornel Dinu
#	Date	Venue	Cap	Opponent	Score	Result	Competition
1	8 April 1972	Stadionul 23 August, Bucharest, Romania	27	France	2–0	2–0	Friendly
2	11 May 1975	Stadionul 23 August, Bucharest, Romania	49	Denmark	6–0	6–1	Euro 1976 qualifiers
3	12 October 1975	Stadionul 23 August, Bucharest, Romania	52	Turkey	2–2	2–2	Friendly

== Honours ==
=== Player ===
Dinamo București

- Divizia A: 1970–71, 1972–73, 1974–75, 1976–77, 1981–82, 1982–83
- Cupa României: 1967–68, 1981–82

Individual

- Romanian Footballer of the Year: 1970, 1972, 1974
- Ballon d'Or: 1970 (24th place)
- Dinamo București leader of appearances in Divizia A: 454

=== Manager ===
Dinamo București

- Divizia A: 1999–2000, 2001–02
- Cupa României: 1999–2000, 2000–01
