= Ion Nunweiller =

Romanian footballer and manager (1936–2015)

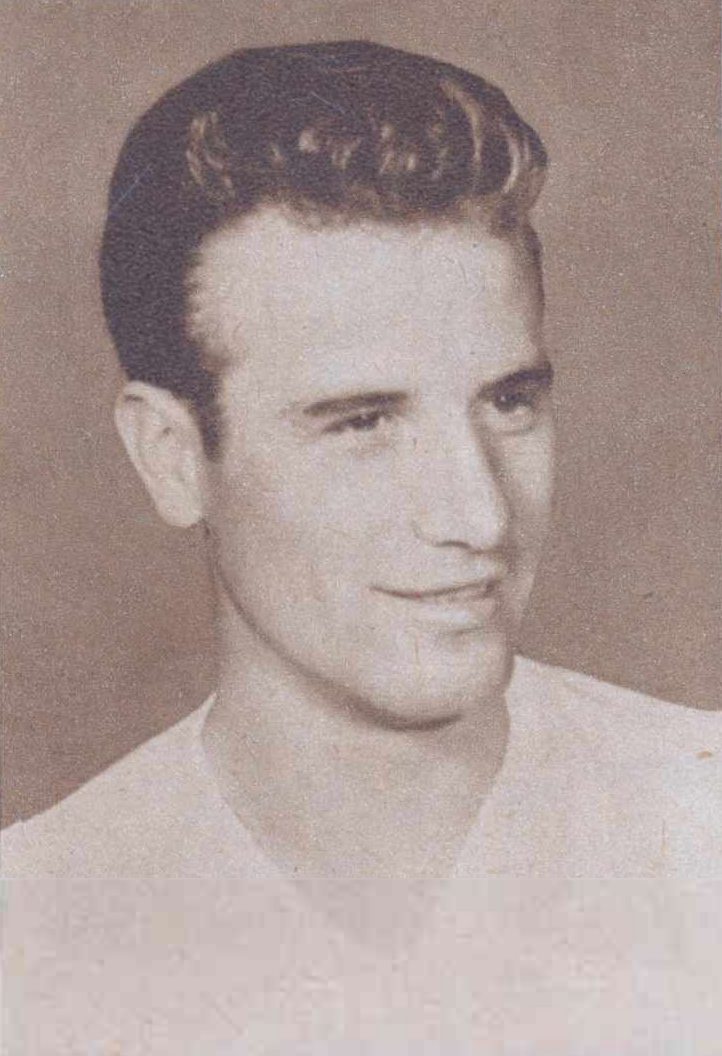

Personal information
- Date of birth: 9 January 1936
- Place of birth: Piatra Neamț, Romania
- Date of death: 3 February 2015 (aged 79)
- Place of death: Pitești, Romania
- Height: 1.79 m (5 ft 10 in)
- Position: Defender

Youth career
- 1950–1951: Progresul ICAB București
- 1951–1955: Dinamo București

Senior career*
Years	Team	Apps	(Gls)
1956	Dinamo 6 București		
1956–1968	Dinamo București (Note: The statistics for the 1957 unofficial championship called Cupa Primăverii are not taken into consideration.)	244	(19)
1968–1970	Fenerbahçe	57	(6)
1970–1972	Dinamo București	35	(0)
Total		336	(25)

International career
1958–1967	Romania	40 (Note: Including 14 appearances for Romania's Olympic team)	(0)

Managerial career
- 1972–1974: Dinamo București
- 1974–1975: Dinamo București (assistant)
- 1976–1979: Dinamo București
- 1979–1981: Romania U21
- 1981–1983: Gloria Bistrița
- 1984–1985: Corvinul Hunedoara
- 1985–1986: Victoria București
- 1986–1989: Flacăra Moreni
- 1990: Argeș Pitești
- 1990–1991: Bursaspor
- 1991–1992: Argeș Pitești (technical director)
- 1992–1993: Ceahlăul Piatra Neamț
- 1996–1998: Romania (women)
- 1998–1999: FC Baia Mare
- * Club domestic league appearances and goals

Ion Nunweiller (9 January 1936 – 3 February 2015) was a Romanian football player and manager who played as a defender.

== Club career ==
=== Early career ===
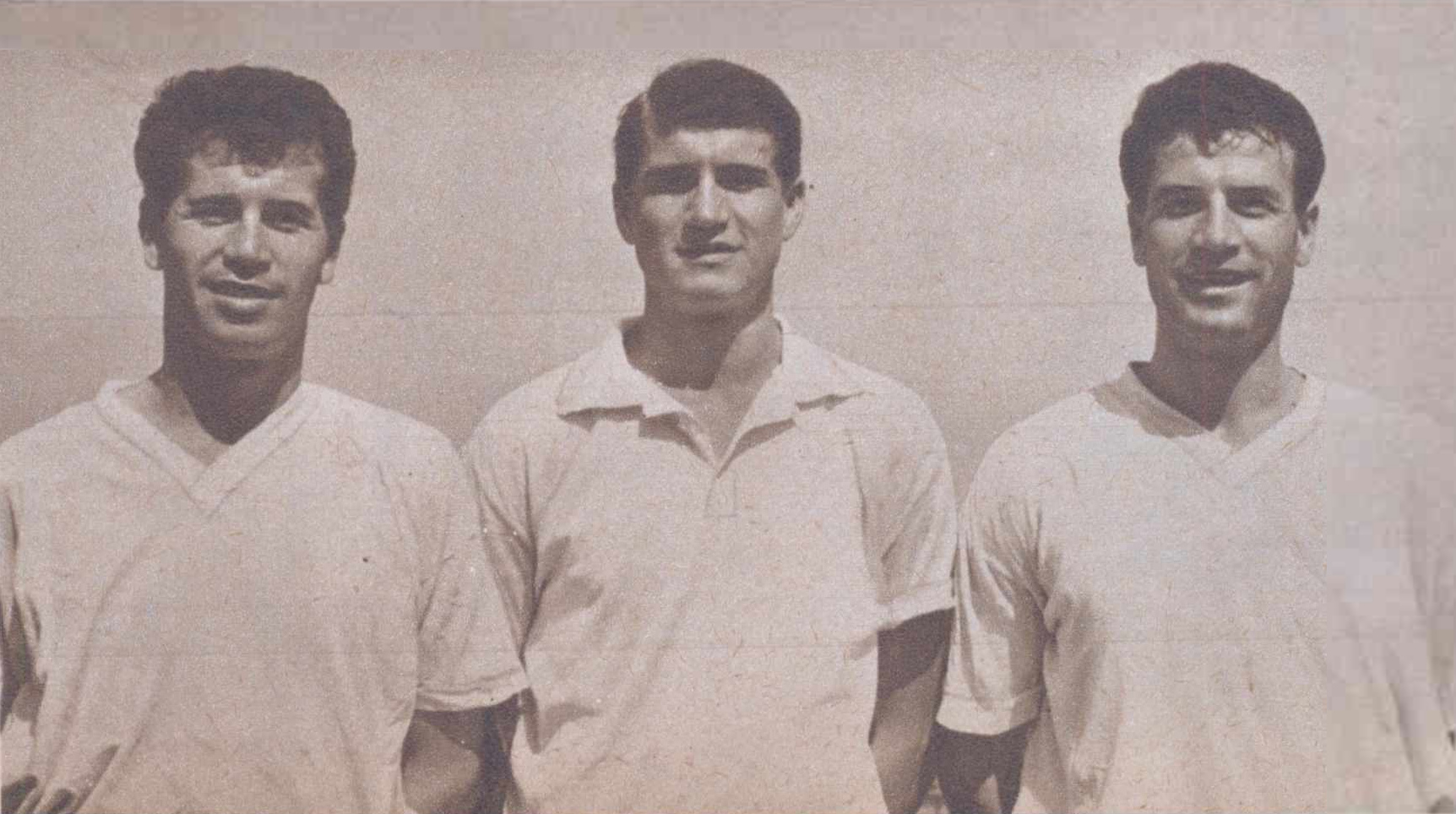
The Nunweiller brothers (left to right): Lică, Radu and Ion

Nunweiller was born on 9 January 1936 in Piatra Neamț, Romania. He had an Austrian father named Johann Nunweiller, who settled in Piatra Neamț after World War I where he met his wife, Rozina, and later they moved to Bucharest. He had six brothers: Constantin, the oldest, was a water polo player, while Dumitru, Lică, Victor, Radu, and Eduard were all footballers who each played at least one spell at Dinamo București. They are the reason why the club's nickname is "The Red Dogs" as especially he and Lică were known for their aggressiveness on the field, which often caused their faces to turn red from the effort. Nunweiller began playing junior-level football in 1950 at Progresul ICAB București, and one year later, he moved to Dinamo București where he worked with coach Petre Steinbach. He started his senior career in 1956, playing for Dinamo 6 București in Divizia B.

=== Dinamo București ===
Nunweiller came back to Dinamo București where on 12 August 1956 he made his Divizia A debut under coach Angelo Niculescu in a 2–1 victory against Dinamo Bacău. In his first seasons spent with Dinamo he scored four goals against rivals Steaua București, including a brace in a 2–1 victory. He won his first trophy after being used the entire match by coach Iuliu Baratky in the 4–0 win over CSM Baia Mare in the 1959 Cupa României final.

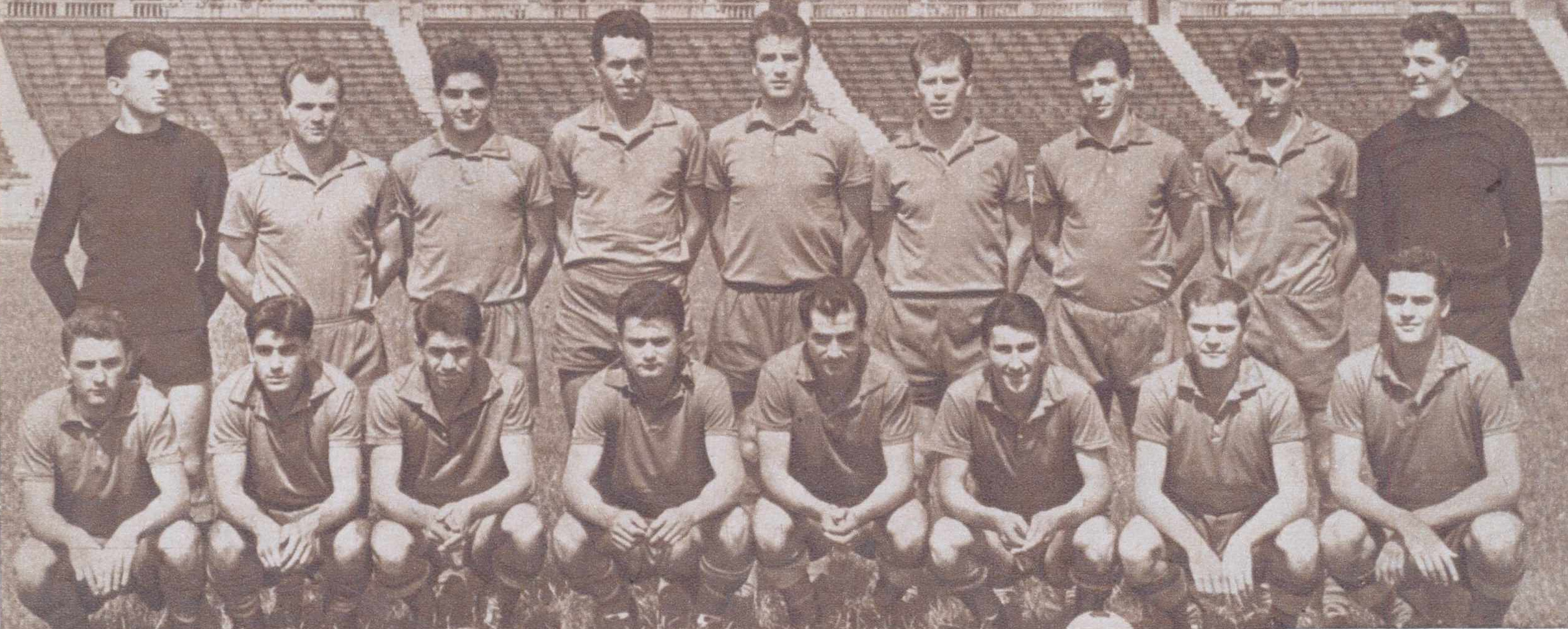
Nunweiller (back row, centre) with Dinamo București in 1963.

Nunweiller helped the club win four consecutive Divizia A titles from 1962 until 1965. In the first one he worked with three coaches, Traian Ionescu, Constantin Teașcă, and Nicolae Dumitru, who gave him 26 appearances in which he scored three goals. In the following two Dumitru and Ionescu used him in 18 and 26 matches, respectively. In the last one he played 25 games under the guidance of Angelo Niculescu. At the conquest of all these titles he was teammates with his brother Lică, and his brother Radu was also on the team for the last two.

Nunweiller also won two more Cupa României trophies with The Red Dogs. Coach Ionescu used him and his brothers Lică and Radu for the full 90 minutes in the 5–3 victory over Steaua in the 1964 final. In the 1968 final, he played the entire match which was a 3–1 win over Rapid București, being coached by Bazil Marian. Nunweiller played for Dinamo in a total of 19 European Cup matches in which he scored twice and one Inter-Cities Fairs Cup game. He appeared in the first European match of a Romanian team, the 3–1 victory against Galatasaray in the 1956–57 European Cup, helping the team go to the next phase of the competition where they were eliminated by CDNA Sofia. In the 1963–64 European Cup edition, he scored once in a 2–0 victory against East Germany champion Motor Jena which helped them advance to the next phase where they were defeated by Real Madrid against whom he scored in a 5–3 loss. He also appeared in a historical 2–1 win over Inter Milan in the 1965–66 edition who were the winners of the previous two seasons of the competition. For the way he played in 1966, Nunweiller was placed fifth in the ranking for the Romanian Footballer of the Year award.

=== Fenerbahçe ===
Nunweiller spent two seasons at Fenerbahçe from 1968 until 1970, making him one of the first Romanians to play professional football in Turkey. His debut in the Turkish league took place on 22 September 1968 under coach Ignác Molnár in a 0–0 draw against Gençlerbirliği. He scored his first goal in the competition in a 1–1 draw against Göztepe. Nunweiller played four games in the 1968–69 European Cup campaign, as the team eliminated the champion of England Manchester City in the first round before they were defeated by Ajax in the following round. In his second season at Fenerbahçe, he was coached by Traian Ionescu and teamed up with Ilie Datcu, as the trio had previously worked together at Dinamo. During this championship-winning campaign, Nunweiller made 28 league appearances and scored one goal, secured a TSYD Cup by netting the only goal in a win against Beşiktaş, and earned recognition as the best foreign player of the 1969–70 season.

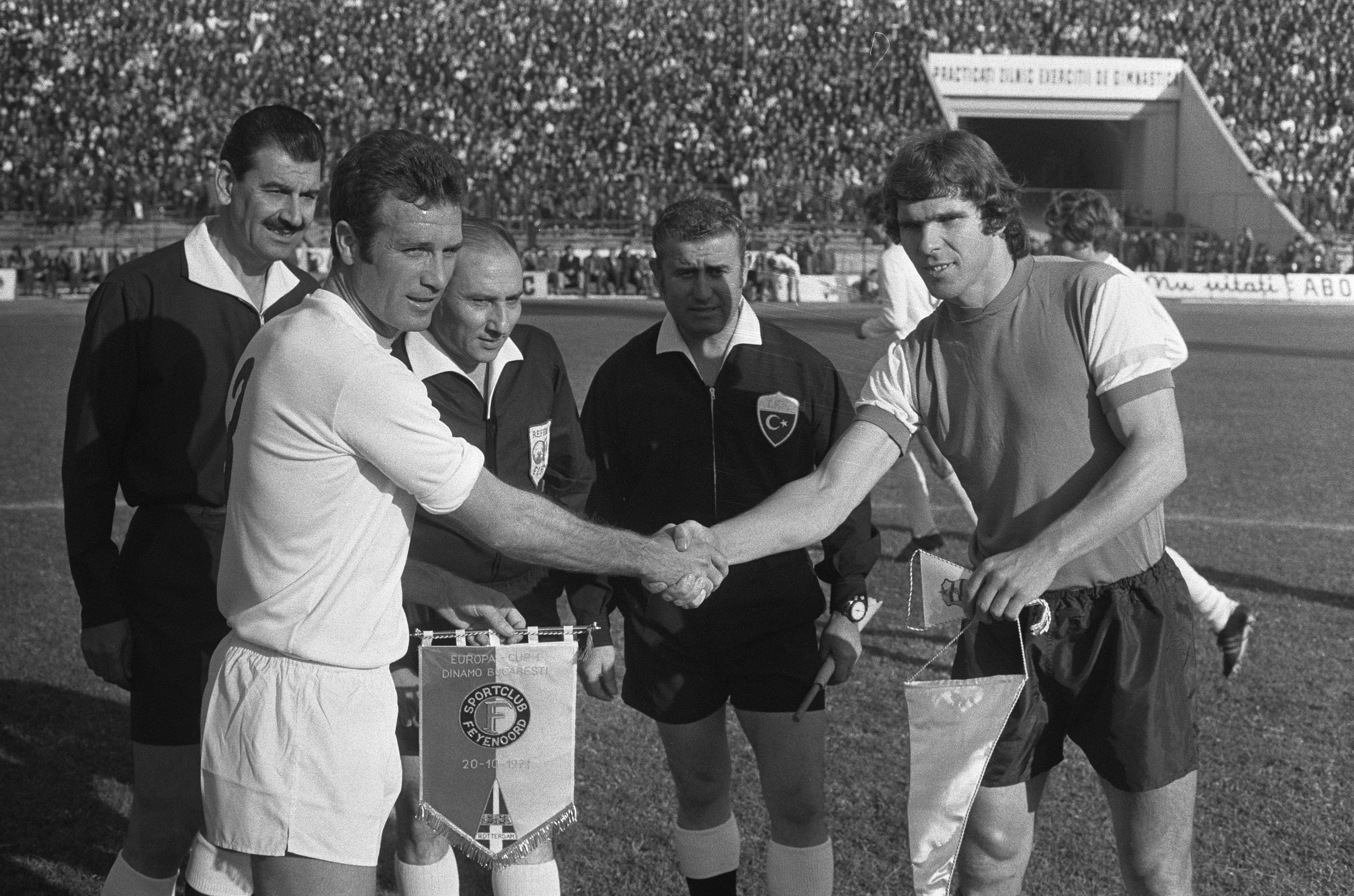
Nunweiller (left) with Willem van Hanegem of Feyenoord in 1971

=== Return to Dinamo București ===
In 1970, Nunweiller returned to Dinamo and in his first season he won another title, playing alongside his brother Radu, with coaches Dumitru and Ionescu using him in 20 games. Nunweiller made his last Divizia A appearance on 12 December 1971 in a 2–1 away loss to Argeș Pitești, totaling 279 matches with 19 goals in the competition.

== International career ==
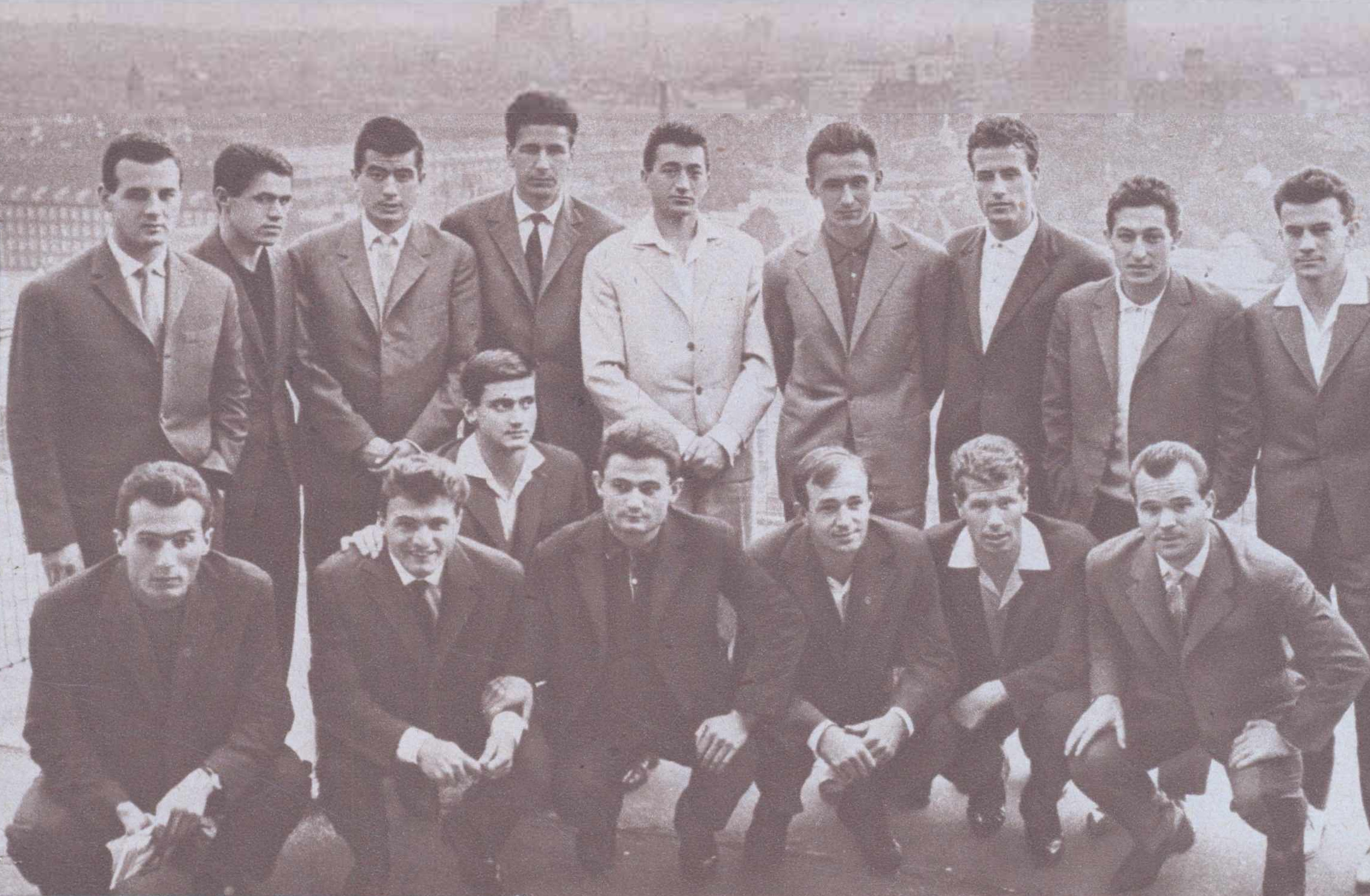
Nunweiller (top row, third from right) with the Romania Olympic team in Copenhagen, Denmark (1963)

Nunweiller played 26 games for Romania, making his debut on 26 October 1958 under coach Augustin Botescu in a 2–1 friendly loss to rivals Hungary. He played four matches in the 1960 European Nations' Cup qualifiers as Romania eliminated Turkey in the round of 16, reaching the quarter-finals where they were defeated by Czechoslovakia, who advanced to the final tournament. Nunweiller played two games in the 1964 European Nations' Cup qualifiers, one during the 1966 World Cup qualifiers and four in the Euro 1968 qualifiers. He also played for Romania's Olympic team, being chosen by coach Silviu Ploeșteanu to be part of the 1964 Summer Olympics squad in Tokyo where he played four games, helping the team finish the competition in fifth place.

== Managerial career ==
After ending his playing career in 1972, Nunweiller became the head coach of Dinamo București, managing to win the title in his first season, one of his players being his brother Radu. Together, they won another title in the 1974–75 season, but this time Nunweiller was the assistant coach of Nicolae Dumitru. As head coach he led The Red Dogs to a third title in the 1976–77 season, having his brother Lică as his assistant coach. Nunweiller secured his first continental success in the first round of the 1973–74 European Cup by helping the club defeat Crusaders 12–0 on aggregate, a tie that included an 11–0 second-leg victory which set a record for the biggest goal difference in the competition's history. In the second round they were defeated 4–2 on aggregate by Atlético Madrid. He eventually led Dinamo to defeat Atlético 2–1 in the first leg of the first round of the 1977–78 European Cup, but the club failed to advance further as they had lost the second leg 2–0.

In the following years, Nunweiller qualified Flacăra Moreni for the 1989–90 UEFA Cup and managed Bursaspor in the first half of the 1990–91 Turkish league season. During his spell at the latter team, he had under his command a young Hakan Şükür, and compatriots Claudiu Vaișcovici and Gheorghe Nițu. Subsequently, he obtained the first-ever promotion to Divizia A of his hometown team Ceahlăul Piatra Neamț. Nunweiller has a total of 374 matches as a manager in the Romanian top-division, Divizia A, consisting of 163 victories, 76 draws and 135 losses.

On 25 March 2008, Nunweiller was decorated by the president of Romania, Traian Băsescu for all of his achievements as a football coach, and for forming young generations of future champions with Ordinul "Meritul Sportiv" — (The Order "The Sportive Merit") class III.

== Death ==
Nunweiller died on 3 February 2015 at age 79 in a hospital in Pitești. He was buried in a cemetery in Albota, with his coffin wrapped in the flags of Dinamo București and Fenerbahçe. After his death, his former Dinamo teammate, Cornel Dinu talked about him: "He was the creator of The Red Dogs symbol and the main pillar of resistance through which the great team was built from the early 1960s. A player who had many moments of heroism, blocking opponents and ensuring that his own defense was never overtaken. He was an indisputable leader of that era and achieved great success as a coach in the 1970s, also serving in a leadership role at Dinamo. Both as a player and as a coach, he embodied the spirit of determination and loyalty in service to the club."

== Honours ==
=== Player ===
Dinamo București

- Divizia A: 1961–62, 1962–63, 1963–64, 1964–65, 1970–71
- Cupa României: 1958–59, 1963–64, 1967–68

Fenerbahçe

- Turkish Super League: 1969–70
- TSYD Cup: 1969

=== Manager ===
Dinamo București

- Divizia A: 1972–73, 1976–77

Dinamo București (assistant)

- Divizia A: 1974–75

Ceahlăul Piatra Neamț

- Divizia B: 1992–93

== See also ==
- List of European association football families
