= 1970–71 Cupa României =

Tournament details
- Country: Romania

Final positions
- Champions: Steaua București
- Runners-up: Dinamo București

The 1970–71 Cupa României was the 33rd edition of Romania's most prestigious football cup competition.

The title was won by Steaua București against Dinamo București.

== Format ==
The competition is an annual knockout tournament.

In the first round proper, two pots were made, first pot with Divizia A teams and other teams till 16 and the second pot with the rest of teams qualified in this phase. Each tie is played as a single leg.

First round proper matches are played on the ground of the lowest ranked team, then from the second round proper the matches are played on a neutral location.

In the first round proper, if a match is drawn after 90 minutes, the game goes in extra time, and if the score is still tight after 120 minutes, the team who played away will qualify.

From the second round proper, if a match is drawn after 90 minutes, the game goes in extra time, and if the scored is still tight after 120 minutes, then the team from the lower division will qualify. If the teams are from the same division, the younger team will qualify.

In the quarter-finals and in the semi-finals, each tie is played as a two legs.

From the first edition, the teams from Divizia A entered in competition in sixteen finals, rule which remained till today.

== First round proper ==
| Team 1 | Score | Team 2 |
|---|---|---|
7 March 1971
| CFR Arad (Div. B) | 0–3 | (Div. A) Argeș Pitești |
| Metalul București (Div. B) | 2–0 | (Div. A) Universitatea Craiova |
| IRA Câmpina (Div. C) | 1–3 | (Div. A) Rapid București |
| Unirea Dej (Div. C) | 0–2 | (Div. A) Universitatea Cluj |
| Minerul Comăneşti (Div. C) | 1–6 | (Div. A) SC Bacău |
| Fulgerul Dorohoi (Div. C) | 0–1 | (Div. A) CFR Timișoara |
| Chimia Făgăraş (Div. C) | 2–1 | (Div. A) CFR Cluj |
| Corvinul Hunedoara (Div. B) | 0–2 | (Div. A) Steaua București |
| IMU Medgidia (Div. C) | 0–1 | (Div. A) Farul Constanța |
| ASA Crişul Oradea (Div. B) | 5–1 | (Div. A) Politehnica Iași |
| Steagul Roşu Pleniţa (Div. C) | 0–4 | (Div. A) UTA Arad |
| Oltul Sfântu Gheorghe (Div. C) | 0–1 | (Div. A) Petrolul Ploiești |
| CSM Sibiu (Div. B) | 0–4 | (Div. A) Progresul București |
| Politehnica Timișoara (Div. B) | 3–0 | (Div. A) Steagul Roşu Braşov |
| Aurora Urziceni (Div. D) | 0–2 | (Div. A) Dinamo București |
10 March 1971
| Progresul Brăila (Div. B) | 2–1 | (Div. A) Jiul Petroşani |

== Second round proper ==
| Team 1 | Score | Team 2 |
|---|---|---|
24 March 1971
| Dinamo București | 1–0 | Chimia Făgăraş |
| Politehnica Timișoara | 3–0 (forfait) | Progresul București‡ |
| UTA Arad | 0–2 | Universitatea Cluj |
| Metalul București | 0–0 (a.e.t.) | Petrolul Ploiești |
| Progresul Brăila | 0–0 (a.e.t.) | SC Bacău |
| ASA Crişul Oradea | 0–0 (a.e.t.) | Farul Constanța |
| Steaua București | 1–1 (a.e.t.) | Argeș Pitești |
| CFR Timișoara | 0–0 (a.e.t.) | Rapid București |

Notes:

- ‡ Progresul București lost this match because forgot the identification cards home.

== Quarter-finals ==
The matches were scheduled to be played on 28 April and 2 June 1971.

| Team 1 | Agg. | Team 2 | 1st leg | 2nd leg |
|---|---|---|---|---|
| Dinamo București | 4–1 | Progresul Brăila | 4–1 | 0–0 |
| Metalul București | 4–0 | CFR Timișoara | 4–0 | 0–0 |
| Steaua București | 6–0 | ASA Crişul Oradea | 5–0 | 1–0 |
| Politehnica Timișoara | 2–3 | Universitatea Cluj | 1–3 | 1–0 |

== Semi-finals ==
The matches were scheduled to be played on 16 June and 23 June 1971.

| Team 1 | Agg. | Team 2 | 1st leg | 2nd leg |
|---|---|---|---|---|
| Metalul București | 2–5 | Dinamo București | 1–0 | 1–5 |
| Universitatea Cluj | 2–6 | Steaua București | 2–2 | 0–4 |

== Final ==
4 July 1971
17:30 EET

| Steaua București | 3–2 | Dinamo București |
|---|---|---|
| Tătaru 23' (pen.), 30', 80' | Report | Lucescu 2', 58' (pen.) |

23 August, Bucharest
Attendance: 50,000
Referee: Kevork Ghemigean (Bucharest)
