= Nicolae Dumitru (footballer) =

Romanian football player and manager (1928–2005)

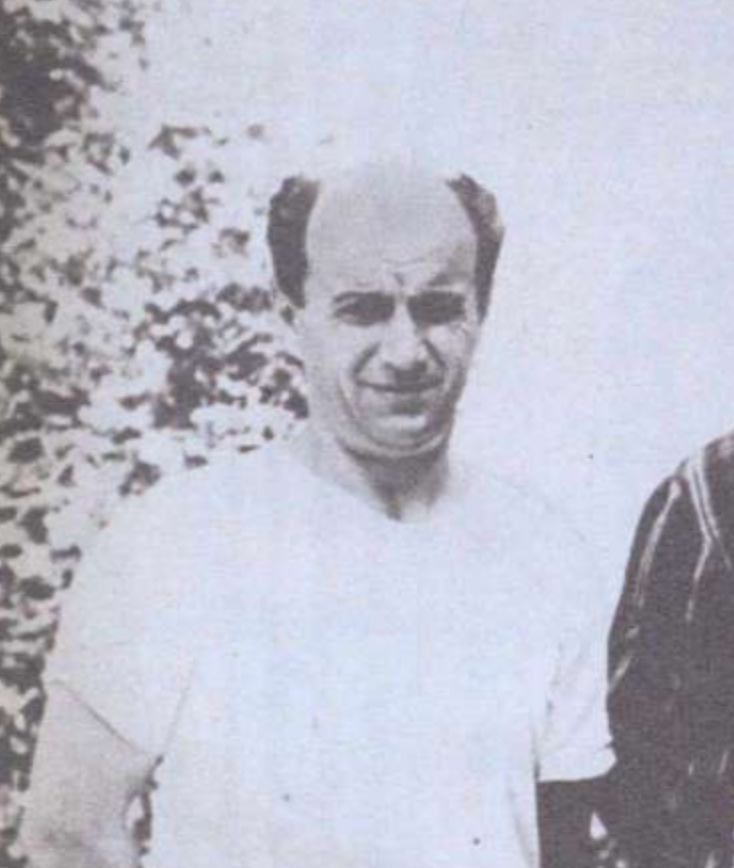
- Dumitru in 1968

Personal information
- Date of birth: 12 December 1928
- Place of birth: Bucharest, Romania
- Date of death: 8 August 2005 (aged 76)
- Place of death: Bucharest, Romania
- Position: Forward

Senior career*
Years	Team	Apps	(Gls)
1945–1947	Sparta București (Note: The 1940–41 Divizia A was the last season before World War II and the 1946–47 Divizia A was the first one after, so the appearances during this period for Sparta București are not official with the exception of the 1945–46 regional championship, also the statistics for the 1946–47 Divizia B season are unavailable.)	14	(2)
1947–1949	Metalochimic București (Note: The statistics for the 1947–48 Divizia B season are unavailable.)	23	(11)
1949–1959	Dinamo București	168	(45)
Total		205	(58)

International career
1953–1955	Romania	8	(0)

Managerial career
- 1959–1961: Dinamo București
- 1962–1963: Dinamo București
- 1963–1964: Dinamo București
- 1965–1967: Victoria București
- 1967–1969: SC Bacău
- 1969–1972: Dinamo București
- 1973–1974: Ghana
- 1974–1976: Dinamo București
- 1976–1978: SC Bacău
- 1982–1984: Dinamo București
- 1984–1986: SC Bacău
- 1986–1988: Victoria București
- 1988–1989: Argeș Pitești
- 1991: Progresul Brăila
- 1993: Progresul București
- * Club domestic league appearances and goals

Nicolae "Nicușor" Dumitru (12 December 1928 – 8 August 2005) was a Romanian football player and manager.

He is the most successful manager in Romania, winning the Romanian first league on seven occasions, all with Dinamo București. Dumitru also won two Romanian Cups, and went on to guide Dinamo to the European Cup semi-finals in the 1983–84 season. He has a total of 558 matches as manager in Divizia A.

As a player, he played as a forward, spending most of his career with Dinamo București.

== Club career ==
Dumitru was born on 12 December 1928 in Bucharest, Romania and began playing football in 1945 at Sparta București in the regional championship and then in Divizia B. After two seasons he went to play for Metalul București, also in Divizia B, helping them get promoted to Divizia A. Subsequently, he made his debut in the competition under coach Augustin Botescu on 22 August 1948 in Metalul's 6–1 loss to CFR Timișoara.

Dumitru was transferred to Dinamo București in 1949, remaining with the club for 10 seasons. His first performance with the club was reaching the 1954 Cupa României final where coach Angelo Niculescu used him the entire match in the eventual 2–0 loss to Metalul Reșița. In the following season he helped the club win its first Divizia A title, being used by Niculescu in 21 matches in which he scored two goals. Dumitru played in the first European match of a Romanian team in the 1956–57 European Cup in the 3–1 victory against Galatasaray. The Red Dogs advanced to the next phase of the competition where they were eliminated by CDNA Sofia, against whom he scored a goal. On 9 October 1957, he scored a goal in a 3–2 league derby victory against CCA București. He reached another Cupa României final in 1959, and this time the club won it, but coach Iuliu Baratky did not use him in the 4–0 win over CSM Baia Mare. On 23 August 1959, Dumitru played his last Divizia A match for Dinamo in a 0–0 draw against Minerul Lupeni, totaling 191 matches with 56 goals in the competition.

== International career ==
Dumitru played eight games for Romania, making his debut under coach Gheorghe Popescu on 14 June 1953 in a 2–0 away loss to Czechoslovakia in the 1954 World Cup qualifiers. His following two games were in the same qualifiers, with the first being a 3–1 win over Bulgaria and the second a 1–0 loss to Czechoslovakia. His next five games were friendlies, his last appearance taking place on 9 October 1955 in a 1–1 draw against Bulgaria.

== Managerial career ==
"Mr. Nae is part of the golden triumvirate of Dinamo coaches, along with Angelo Niculescu and Traian Ionescu."

— Cornel Dinu, former Dinamo player

Dumitru started his managerial career at Dinamo București, having several spells at the club, winning a total of seven Divizia A titles and two Cupa României. The Cupa României trophies were won after victories against rivals Steaua București in both finals. Dinamo also had some notable results in the European Cup under Dumitru's leadership, which include reaching the round of 16 on three occasions by eliminating East German champions Motor Jena, and Czechoslovak champions Spartak Trnava and Dukla Prague in the 1963–64, 1971–72 and 1982–83 campaigns respectively. He also earned a 1–0 win over Real Madrid in the second leg of the first round of the 1975–76 edition, but the club failed to advance further as they had lost the first leg 4–1. Dumitru's greatest continental achievement was guiding Dinamo to the European Cup semi-finals in the 1983–84 season after eliminating Kuusysi Lahti, the defending champions Hamburg, and Dinamo Minsk, before being eliminated 3–1 on aggregate by Liverpool. In some of his spells at Dinamo, Dumitru co-coached the team alongside Traian Ionescu.

Dumitru also coached Victoria București, SC Bacău, Argeș Pitești, Progresul Brăila and Progresul București in Divizia A, having a total of 558 matches as manager in the competition, consisting of 250 victories, 120 draws and 188 losses. During his stint with Argeș, he led the team to the 1987–88 Balkans Cup final, where they were defeated 6–1 on aggregate by Slavia Sofia. His only experience outside Romania was when he coached Ghana's national team from 1973 until 1974.

== Death ==
Dumitru died on 8 August 2005 in Bucharest at the age of 76.

== Honours ==
=== Player ===
Metalul București

- Divizia B: 1947–48

Dinamo București

- Divizia A: 1955
- Cupa României: 1958–59, runner-up 1954

=== Manager ===
Dinamo București

- Divizia A: 1961–62, 1962–63, 1963–64, 1970–71, 1974–75, 1982–83, 1983–84
- Cupa României: 1963–64, 1983–84

Argeș Pitești

- Balkans Cup runner-up: 1987–88
