= 1967–68 FC Dinamo București season =

FC Dinamo București
1967–68 season
- Manager: Traian Ionescu (rounds 1-13), Bazil Marian (rounds 14-28)
- Divizia A: 3rd
- Romanian Cup: Winner

The 1967–68 season was FC Dinamo București's 19th season in Divizia A. Dinamo wins for the third time the Romanian Cup. In the final, Dinamo defeats Rapid București after extra-time. In the championship, Dinamo finishes third, two points behind the first two teams, Steaua and FC Argeş.

== Results ==
Divizia A
Round	Date	Opponent	Stadium	Result
1	20 August 1967	Petrolul Ploieşti	A	1-0
2	27 August 1967	Universitatea Craiova	H	2-2
3	3 September 1967	Progresul București	A	0-0
4	18 October 1967	FC Argeş	A	1-1
5	10 September 1967	Dinamo Bacău	H	3-0
6	17 September 1967	Steagul Roşu Braşov	A	1-1
7	23 September 1967	Steaua București	H	0-1
8	1 October 1967	UTA	H	0-1
9	15 October 1967	Farul Constanţa	A	0-4
10	22 October 1967	Jiul Petroşani	H	0-0
11	5 November 1967	Rapid București	H	3-2
12	12 November 1967	ASA Târgu Mureş	A	1-2
13	29 November 1967	Universitatea Cluj	H	2-4
14	10 March 1968	Petrolul Ploieşti	H	1-2
15	17 March 1968	Universitatea Craiova	A	1-0
16	24 March 1968	Progresul București	H	2-1
17	31 March 1968	FC Argeş	H	1-0
18	7 April 1968	Dinamo Bacău	A	1-0
19	14 April 1968	Steagul Roşu Braşov	H	1-0
20	21 April 1968	Steaua București	A	2-0
21	28 April 1968	UTA	A	0-1
22	5 May 1968	Farul Constanţa	H	2-1
23	12 May 1968	Jiul Petroşani	A	1-0
24	29 May 1968	Rapid București	A	3-1
25	26 May 1968	ASA Târgu Mureş	H	5-2
26	9 June 1968	Universitatea Cluj	A	0-5

Cupa României
Round	Date	Opponent	Stadium	Result
Last 32	3 March 1968	Metalul București	A	1-0
Last 16	3 April 1968	Chimia Suceava	Bacău	1-0
Quarter-finals	17 April 1968	CFR Timişoara	Tr.Severin	2-1
Semifinals	12 June 1968	Progresul București	București	4-3
Final	16 June 1968	Rapid București	București	3-1

Cupa României 1967–68 Winners
Dinamo București
3rd Title

== Romanian Cup final ==
16 June 1968

Dinamo București	3 – 1 (a.e.t.)	Rapid București
Dumitrache 78'; Lucescu 115', 116'		Năsturescu 70'

Stadionul 23 August, Bucharest
Attendance: 50,000
Referee: Vasile Dumitrescu (Bucharest)

DINAMO:
GK	Spiridon Niculescu
DF	Cornel Popa
DF	Ion Nunweiller
DF	Cornel Dinu
DF	Constantin Ștefan
MF	Vasile Gergely
MF	Mircea Stoenescu
FW	Nicolae Nagy	(substituted off) 77'
FW	Florea Dumitrache
FW	Ion Pîrcălab
FW	Ion Haidu
Substitutes:
FW	Mircea Lucescu	(substituted in) 77'
Manager:
Bazil Marian

RAPID:
GK	Răducanu Necula
DF	Nicolae Lupescu
DF	Ion Motroc
DF	Dan Coe
DF	Ilie Greavu
MF	Ion Dumitru
MF	Constantin Jamaischi
FW	Constantin Năsturescu
FW	Alexandru Neagu
FW	Ion Ionescu	(substituted off) 68'
FW	Teofil Codreanu
Substitutes:
FW	Marian Petreanu	(substituted in) 68'
Manager:
Valentin Stănescu

== Squad ==
Goalkeepers: Ilie Datcu, Spiridon Niculescu.

Defenders: Alexandru Boc, Ion Nunweiller, Cornel Popa, Lazăr Pârvu, Mircea Stoenescu, Constantin Ștefan.

Midfielders: Cornel Dinu, Vasile Gergely, Radu Nunweiller, Viorel Sălceanu.

Forwards: Florea Dumitrache, Ion Haidu, Mircea Lucescu, Nicolae Nagy, Ion Pîrcălab, Octavian Popescu, Iosif Varga.

== Transfers ==
Mircea Lucescu returns after the loan to Politehnica București. Alexandru Boc is transferred from Petrolul Ploiesti. Lică Nunweiller, Gheorghe Ene and Daniel Ene are transferred to Dinamo Bacau, and Gheorghe Grozea is transferred to Petrolul.
