= 1969–70 FC Dinamo București season =

FC Dinamo București
1969–70 season
- Manager: Dumitru Nicolae Nicuşor
- Divizia A: 5th
- Romanian Cup: Finalist

The 1969–70 season was FC Dinamo București's 21st season in Divizia A. Dumitru Nicolae Nicuşor is brought back as manager and he starts to rejuvenate the first team, by promoting some players from the second team, such as Florin Cheran and Iosif Cavai. After a good first half in the championship, ended on the second position, Dinamo had a modest second half, and finished the competition only fifth. In the Romanian Cup, Dinamo reaches the third final in a row, but loses again the trophy.

== Results ==
Divizia A
Round	Date	Opponent	Stadium	Result
1	16 August 1969	Jiul Petroşani	H	5-2
2	24 August 1969	U Cluj	A	0-1
3	31 August 1969	Dinamo Bacău	H	3-1
4	7 September 1969	Steaua București	A	3-2
5	13 September 1969	Steagul Roşu Braşov	A	1-2
6	20 September 1969	Petrolul Ploieşti	H	1-0
7	28 September 1969	Crişul Oradea	A	0-0
8	18 October 1969	U Craiova	H	2-1
9	26 October 1969	Farul Constanţa	A	2-1
10	2 November 1969	UTA	H	6-0
11	3 December 1969	FC Argeş	A	1-2
12	20 November 1969	Rapid București	H	0-2
13	23 November 1969	CFR Cluj	H	3-1
14	30 November 1969	Poli Iaşi	A	0-3
15	7 December 1969	ASA Târgu Mureş	H	3-1
16	8 March 1970	Jiul Petroşani	A	0-1
17	15 March 1970	U Cluj	H	1-2
18	22 March 1970	Dinamo Bacău	A	3-3
19	29 March 1970	Steaua București	H	0-1
20	5 April 1970	Steagul Roşu Braşov	H	1-0
21	12 April 1970	Petrolul Ploieşti	A	1-1
22	18 April 1970	Crişul Oradea	H	2-1
23	28 June 1970	U Craiova	A	2-1
24	1 July 1970	Farul Constanţa	H	2-3
25	5 July 1970	UTA	A	1-2
26	8 July 1970	FC Argeş	H	4-1
27	12 July 1970	Rapid București	A	2-1
28	15 July 1970	CFR Cluj	A	1-2
29	19 July 1970	Poli Iaşi	H	1-1
30	22 July 1970	ASA Târgu Mureş	A	0-2

Cupa României
Round	Date	Opponent	Stadium	Result
Last 32	17 May 1970	FC Politehnica Timișoara	A	1-0
Last 16	31 May 1970	Tractorul Brașov	Câmpina	3-0
Quarterfinals	13 June 1970	Jiul Petroşani	Sibiu	2-1
Semifinals	24 June 1970	Steagul Roşu Braşov	Câmpina	3-1
Final	26 July 1970	Steaua București	București	1-2

== Romanian Cup final ==
26 July 1970

Dinamo București	1–2	Steaua București
Dumitrache 79'		Voinea 7', 56'

Stadionul 23 August, Bucharest
Attendance: 30,000
Referee: Gheorghe Limona (Bucharest)

DINAMO:
GK	Iosif Cavai
DF	Florin Cheran
DF	Lică Nunweiller	(substituted off) 46'
DF	Cornel Dinu
DF	Augustin Deleanu
MF	Viorel Sălceanu
MF	Radu Nunweiller
FW	Ion Pîrcălab
FW	Mircea Lucescu
FW	Florea Dumitrache
FW	Ion Haidu	(substituted off) 64'
Substitutes:
MF	Mircea Stoenescu	(substituted in) 46'
FW	Gavril Both	(substituted in) 64'
Manager:
Dumitru Nicolae Nicuşor

STEAUA:
GK	Vasile Suciu
DF	Gheorghe Cristache
DF	Lajos Sătmăreanu
DF	Marius Ciugarin
DF	Iosif Vigu
MF	Dumitru Dumitriu
MF	Ioan Naom
FW	Costică Ştefănescu	(substituted off) 60'
FW	Florea Voinea
FW	Anghel Iordănescu
FW	Carol Creiniceanu	(substituted off) 65'
Substitutes:
FW	Vasile Negrea	(substituted in) 60'
FW	Mihai Mirăuţă	(substituted in) 65'
Manager:
Ştefan Kovacs

== Transfers ==
Before the season, Dinamo transferred Augustin Deleanu from Poli Iasi, Lică Nunweiller from Dinamo Bacău and Marin Andrei from Steaua. Florin Cheran, Iosif Cavai, Alexandru Moldovan and Vasile Dobrău are promoted from the second squad.

Some players were transferred abroad: Ilie Datcu to Fenerbahçe, Lică Nunweiller and Cornel Popa to Beşiktaş, Iosif Varga to Wuppertaler SV.
