= 1968–69 FC Dinamo București season =

FC Dinamo București
1968–69 season
- Manager: Bazil Marian
- Divizia A: 2nd
- Romanian Cup: Finalist
- Cup Winners' Cup: Second round
- Top goalscorer: Florea Dumitrache (22 goals)

The 1968–69 season was FC Dinamo București's 20th season in Divizia A. Dinamo reaches for the second year in a row the final of Romanian Cup, but this time loses the trophy. In the championship, Dinamo finishes the season in the second place, three points behind the champions UTA. In Europe, Dinamo entered the Cup Winners's Cup and advances to the second round after the withdrawal by Vasas ETO Győr.

== Results ==
Divizia A
| Round | Date | Opponent | Stadium | Result |
|---|---|---|---|---|
| 1 | 11 August 1968 | ASA Târgu Mureş | A | 1-2 |
| 2 | 18 August 1968 | Vagonul Arad | H | 4-1 |
| 3 | 5 December 1968 | FC Argeş | A | 1-3 |
| 4 | 1 September 1968 | Steaua București | A | 1-0 |
| 5 | 8 September 1968 | Crişul Oradea | H | 2-0 |
| 6 | 14 September 1968 | Dinamo Bacău | A | 0-1 |
| 7 | 22 September 1968 | Poli Iaşi | H | 4-1 |
| 8 | 29 September 1968 | Rapid București | H | 2-3 |
| 9 | 6 October 1968 | Jiul Petroşani | A | 0-0 |
| 10 | 13 October 1968 | Farul Constanţa | H | 4-2 |
| 11 | 20 October 1968 | UTA | A | 0-3 |
| 12 | 2 November 1968 | Progresul București | A | 1-1 |
| 13 | 10 November 1968 | Universitatea Cluj | H | 3-0 |
| 14 | 17 November 1968 | Petrolul Ploieşti | A | 0-1 |
| 15 | 2 December 1968 | Universitatea Craiova | H | 5-0 |
| 16 | 9 March 1969 | ASA Târgu Mureş | H | 4-0 |
| 17 | 16 March 1969 | Vagonul Arad | A | 0-1 |
| 18 | 23 March 1969 | FC Argeş | H | 2-1 |
| 19 | 26 March 1969 | Steaua București | H | 4-2 |
| 20 | 30 March 1969 | Crişul Oradea | A | 1-1 |
| 21 | 6 April 1969 | Dinamo Bacău | H | 2-1 |
| 22 | 20 April 1969 | Poli Iaşi | A | 1-1 |
| 23 | 26 April 1969 | Rapid București | A | 0-1 |
| 24 | 4 May 1969 | Jiul Petroşani | H | 1-0 |
| 25 | 18 May 1969 | Farul Constanţa | A | 0-1 |
| 26 | 25 May 1969 | UTA | H | 4-3 |
| 27 | 1 June 1969 | Progresul București | H | 4-1 |
| 28 | 8 June 1969 | Universitatea Cluj | A | 0-0 |
| 29 | 11 June 1969 | Petrolul Ploieşti | H | 4-1 |
| 30 | 15 June 1969 | Universitatea Craiova | A | 0-1 |

Cupa României
| Round | Date | Opponent | Stadium | Result |
|---|---|---|---|---|
| Last 32 | 5 March 1969 | Ceahlăul Piatra Neamţ | A | 4-0 |
| Last 16 | 12 March 1969 | FC Argeş | Târgovişte | 1-0 |
| Quarter-finals | 21 May 1969 | UTA | Braşov | 3-0 |
| Semifinals first leg | 28 May 1969 | Chimia Suceava | H | 5-1 |
| Semifinals second leg | 4 June 1969 | Chimia Suceava | A | 3-1 |
| Final | 16 June 1969 | Steaua București | București | 1-2 |

== Romanian Cup final ==
22 June 1969

| Dinamo București | 1 – 2 | Steaua București |
|---|---|---|
| Dumitrache 50' | | Voinea 43', 75' |

Stadionul 23 August, Bucharest
Attendance: 45,000
Referee: Aurel Bentu (Bucharest)

DINAMO:
| GK | Narcis Coman | (substituted off) 46' |
| DF | Cornel Popa |
| DF | Alexandru Boc |
| DF | Cornel Dinu |
| DF | Constantin Ștefan |
| MF | Vasile Gergely |
| MF | Mircea Stoenescu |
| MF | Radu Nunweiller |
| FW | Florea Dumitrache |
| FW | Ion Pîrcălab | (substituted off) 50' |
| FW | Mircea Lucescu |
Substitutes:
| GK | Ilie Datcu | (substituted in) 46' |
| FW | Viorel Sălceanu | (substituted in) 50' |
Manager:
Bazil Marian

STEAUA:
| GK | Vasile Suciu |
| DF | Lajos Sătmăreanu |
| DF | Nicolae Dumitru |
| DF | Bujor Hălmăgeanu |
| DF | Iosif Vigu |
| MF | Dumitru Dumitriu |
| MF | Vasile Negrea |
| FW | Nicolae Pantea | (substituted off) 88' |
| FW | Florea Voinea |
| FW | Gheorghe Tătaru |
| FW | Carol Creiniceanu |
Substitutes:
| FW | Vasile Şoo | (substituted in) 88' |
Manager:
Ştefan Kovacs

== Cup Winners' Cup ==
Second round – first leg

13 November 1968
14:15

| Dinamo București | 1 – 1 | West Bromwich Albion |
|---|---|---|
| Dumitrache 23' | | Hartford 28' |

Stadionul 23 August, Bucharest
Attendance: 15,000
Referee: Hans-Joachim Weyland (West Germany)
27 November 1968
20:30

| West Bromwich Albion | 4 – 0 | Dinamo București |
|---|---|---|
| Lovett 35'; Brown 44', 52' (pen.); Astle 72' |

The Hawthorns, Birmingham
Attendance: 33,059
Referee: Robert Hélies (France)

== Squad ==
Goalkeepers: Narcis Coman, Ilie Datcu.

Defenders: Alexandru Boc, Virgil Crăciunescu, Cornel Dinu, Lazăr Pârvu, Cornel Popa, Mircea Stoenescu, Constantin Ștefan.

Midfielders: Vasile Gergely, Radu Nunweiller, Viorel Sălceanu.

Forwards: Florea Dumitrache, Constantin Frățilă, Ion Haidu, Mircea Lucescu, Nicolae Nagy, Ion Pîrcălab, Iosif Varga.

== Transfers ==
Narcis Coman is brought from FC Argeş. Ion Nunweiller is transferred to Fenerbahçe.
