= 1964–65 FC Dinamo București season =

FC Dinamo București
1964–65 season
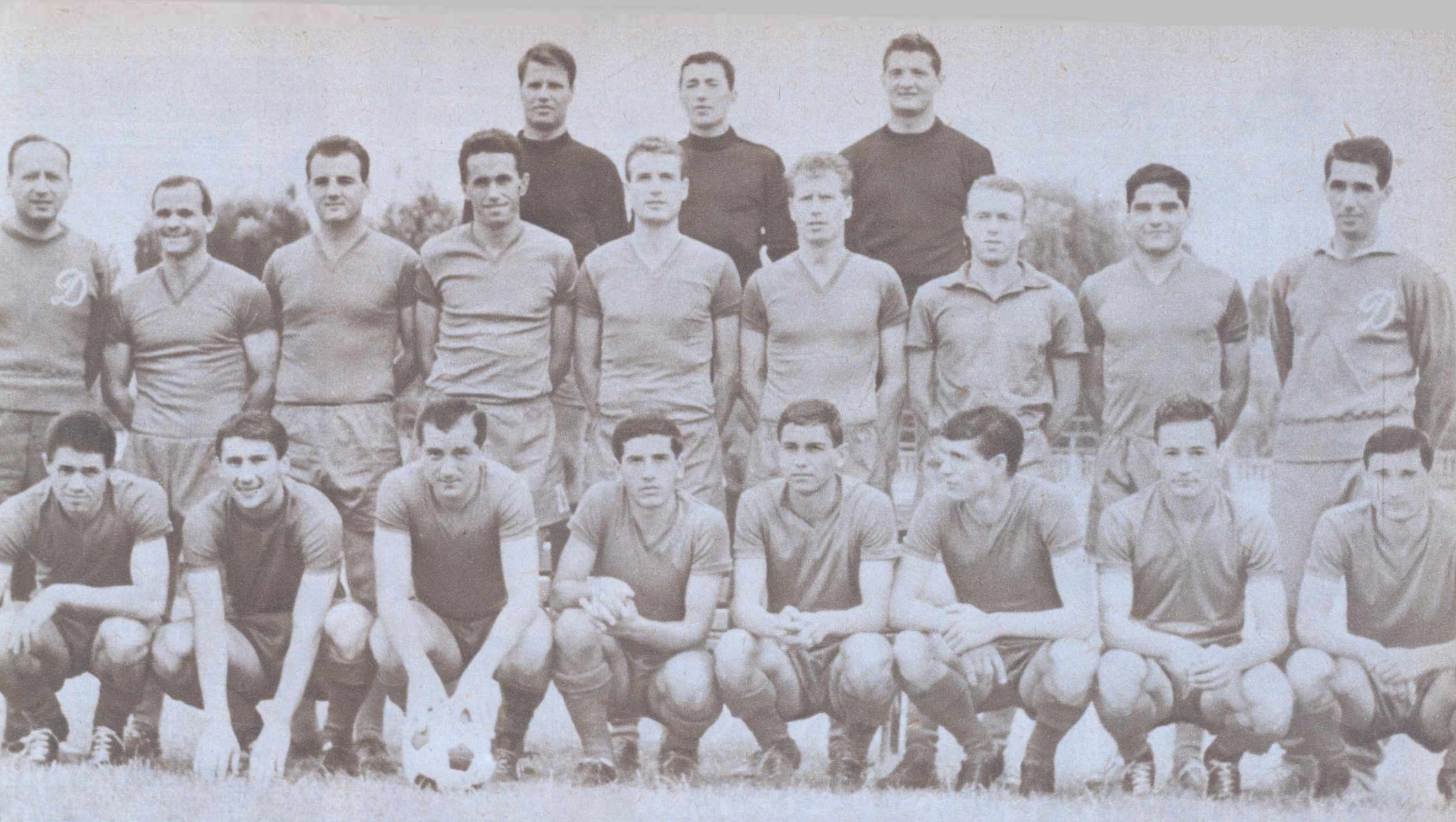
- Manager: Angelo Niculescu
- Divizia A: 1st
- Romanian Cup: Semi-finalist
- European Cup: First round
- Top goalscorer: Gheorghe Ene (15)

The 1964–65 season was FC Dinamo București's 16th season in Divizia A. Dinamo won the league championship for the fourth consecutive season, marking the longest title-winning streak in the club's history. In the European Cup, they were eliminated in the first round by the defending champions, Inter Milan.

== Results ==
Divizia A
Round	Date	Opponent	Stadium	Result
1	30 August 1964	Crişul Oradea	H	2-0
2	6 September 1964	UTA	A	3-0
3	24 December 1964	Rapid București	H	3-1
4	29 November 1964	Dinamo Piteşti	H	2-0
5	10 December 1964	Ştiinţa Cluj	A	1-3
6	5 November 1964	Ştiinţa Craiova	H	3-1
7	17 December 1964	Progresul București	H	4-0
8	13 December 1964	Minerul Baia Mare	A	1-0
9	6 December 1964	CSMS Iaşi	H	2-0
10	1 November 1964	Steagul Roşu Braşov	A	1-3
11	27 December 1964	Steaua București	A	1-0
12	15 November 1964	Farul Constanţa	H	4-1
13	22 November 1964	Petrolul Ploieşti	A	1-3
14	14 March 1965	Crişul Oradea	A	0-0
15	25 March 1965	UTA	H	1-1
16	28 March 1965	Rapid București	A	0-1
17	4 April 1965	Dinamo Piteşti	A	1-1
18	11 April 1965	Ştiinţa Cluj	H	1-2
19	18 April 1965	Ştiinţa Craiova	A	2-0
20	21 April 1965	Progresul București	A	0-0
21	9 May 1965	Minerul Baia Mare	H	4-2
22	16 May 1965	CSMS Iaşi	A	1-0
23	19 May 1965	Steagul Roşu Braşov	H	10-1
24	2 June 1965	Steaua București	H	2-1
25	20 June 1965	Farul Constanţa	A	3-0
26	27 June 1965	Petrolul Ploieşti	H	3-1

Divizia A 1964–65 Winners
Dinamo București
5th Title

Cupa României
Round	Date	Opponent	Stadium	Result
Last 32	6 March 1965	Ştiinţa Galaţi	A	3-0
Last 16	17 March 1965	Petrolul Ploieşti	Constanţa	1-0
Quarter-finals	30 June 1965	Metalul Târgovişte	București	5-0
Semifinals	4 July 1965	Dinamo Piteşti	Ploieşti	0-1

== European Cup ==
Preliminary round – first leg

13 September 1964

Sliema Wanderers (Malta)	0 – 2	Dinamo București
		Frăţilă 4'; Nunweiller 41'

Empire Stadium, Gżira
Attendance: 7,784
Referee: Antonio Sbardella (Italy)

Second leg

19 September 1964
16:00

Dinamo București	5 – 0	Sliema Wanderers
Pîrcălab 30', 42'; Petru 65'; Frăţilă 84', 86'

Stadionul 23 August, Bucharest
Attendance: 10,501
Referee: Dimitar Rumenchev (Bulgaria)

First round – first leg

11 November 1964
19:15

Internazionale (Italy)	6 – 0	Dinamo București
Jair 12' 35'; Mazzola 16' 78'; Luis Suárez 38'; Milani 81'

San Siro, Milan
Attendance: 20,376
Referee: Manuel Gómez Arribas (Spain)

Second leg

3 December 1964
14:00

Dinamo București	0 – 1	Internazionale
		Domenghini 57'

Stadionul 23 August, Bucharest
Attendance: 60,000
Referee: Dimitrios Wlachojanis (Austria)

== Squad ==
Goalkeepers: Ilie Datcu (24 / 0); Iuliu Uțu (6 / 0).
Defenders: Cornel Popa (25 / 0); Ion Nunweiller (25 / 0); Lică Nunweiller (13 / 2); Constantin Ștefan (22 / 0); Dumitru Ivan (19 / 0).
Midfielders: Emil Petru (19 / 4); Octavian Popescu (19 / 4); Vasile Gergely (20 / 0).
Forwards: Ion Pîrcălab (20 / 7); Radu Nunweiller (18 / 1); Constantin Frățilă (23 / 11); Gheorghe Ene (23 / 15); Ion Haidu (23 / 10); Gheorghe Grozea (4 / 0); Iosif Varga (2 / 0); Ion Țîrcovnicu (1 / 0); Vasile Ionescu (1 / 0); Mircea Lucescu (1 / 0).
(league appearances and goals listed in brackets)

Manager: Angelo Niculescu.

== Transfers ==
Țîrcovnicu and Varga were transferred to Dinamo Piteşti. Gheorghe Grozea made his debut in the first squad.
