= Nunweiller =

Nunweiller is the surname of the following people

- Ion Nunweiller (1936–2015), Romanian Romanian football defender and manager
- Lică Nunweiller (1938–2013), Romanian football midfielder, brother of Ion and Radu
- Radu Nunweiller (born 1944), Romanian football player, brother of Ion and Lică
