= Mircea Lucescu =

Romanian football player and manager (1945–2026)

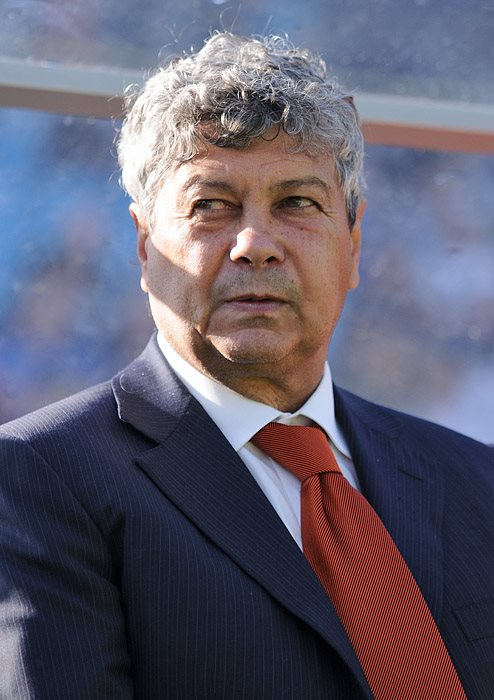
- Lucescu in 2009
- Born: 29 July 1945; Bucharest, Romania
- Died: 7 April 2026 (aged 80); Bucharest, Romania
- Resting place: Bellu Cemetery, Bucharest
- Education: ASE University
- Occupations: Footballer; manager
- Height: 1.77 m (5 ft 10 in)
- Spouse: Neli Lucescu (m. 1967)
- Children: Răzvan
Association football career
- Position: Winger
Youth career
- 1961–1963: Școala Sportivă 2 București
Senior career*
Years	Team	Apps	(Gls)
1963–1977	Dinamo București	250	(57)
1965–1967	→ Știința București (loan)	39	(12)
1977–1982	Corvinul Hunedoara	141	(26)
1990	Dinamo București	1	(0)
Total		431	(95)
International career
1966–1979	Romania	64	(9)
Managerial career
- 1979–1982: Corvinul Hunedoara
- 1981–1986: Romania
- 1985–1990: Dinamo București
- 1990–1991: Pisa
- 1991–1995: Brescia
- 1995–1996: Brescia
- 1996: Reggiana
- 1997–1998: Rapid București
- 1998–1999: Inter Milan
- 1999–2000: Rapid București
- 2000–2002: Galatasaray
- 2002–2004: Beşiktaş
- 2004–2016: Shakhtar Donetsk
- 2016–2017: Zenit Saint Petersburg
- 2017–2019: Turkey
- 2020–2023: Dynamo Kyiv
- 2024–2026: Romania
- * Club domestic league appearances and goals

Mircea Lucescu (Romanian pronunciation: [ˈmirtʃe̯a luˈtʃesku]; 29 July 1945 – 7 April 2026) was a Romanian professional football player and manager.

Lucescu was one of the most successful footballers of the Romanian league championship, having won all seven of his titles with Dinamo București between 1964 and 1990. He also had spells at Știința București and Corvinul Hunedoara, and made 64 appearances for the Romania national team, which he captained at the 1970 FIFA World Cup.

Lucescu started his managerial career in 1979, while still playing for Corvinul Hunedoara. In the next five decades, he went on coach various sides in Romania, Italy, Turkey, Ukraine, and Russia. He was widely regarded for his twelve-year stint in charge of Shakhtar Donetsk, where he became the most successful coach in the club's history by winning eight Ukrainian Premier League titles, six Ukrainian Cups, seven Ukrainian Super Cups, and the 2008–09 UEFA Cup. He also won trophies in Ukraine with Shakhtar's rival Dynamo Kyiv, as well as Romanian titles with Dinamo București and Rapid București, and Turkish Süper Lig titles with Galatasaray and Beşiktaş.

Lucescu was named Romania Coach of the Year in 2004, 2010, 2012, 2014, and 2021, and Ukraine Coach of the Year in 2006 and for seven consecutive years from 2008 to 2014. In 2013, he was awarded the Manager of the Decade award in Romania, and in 2015 became the fifth person to coach in 100 UEFA Champions League matches, joining Alex Ferguson, Carlo Ancelotti, Arsène Wenger, and José Mourinho. He also ranks third in football history with 38 official trophies.

Lucescu died in 2026, aged 80, shortly after completing his second stint with the Romania national team.

== Early life and club career ==
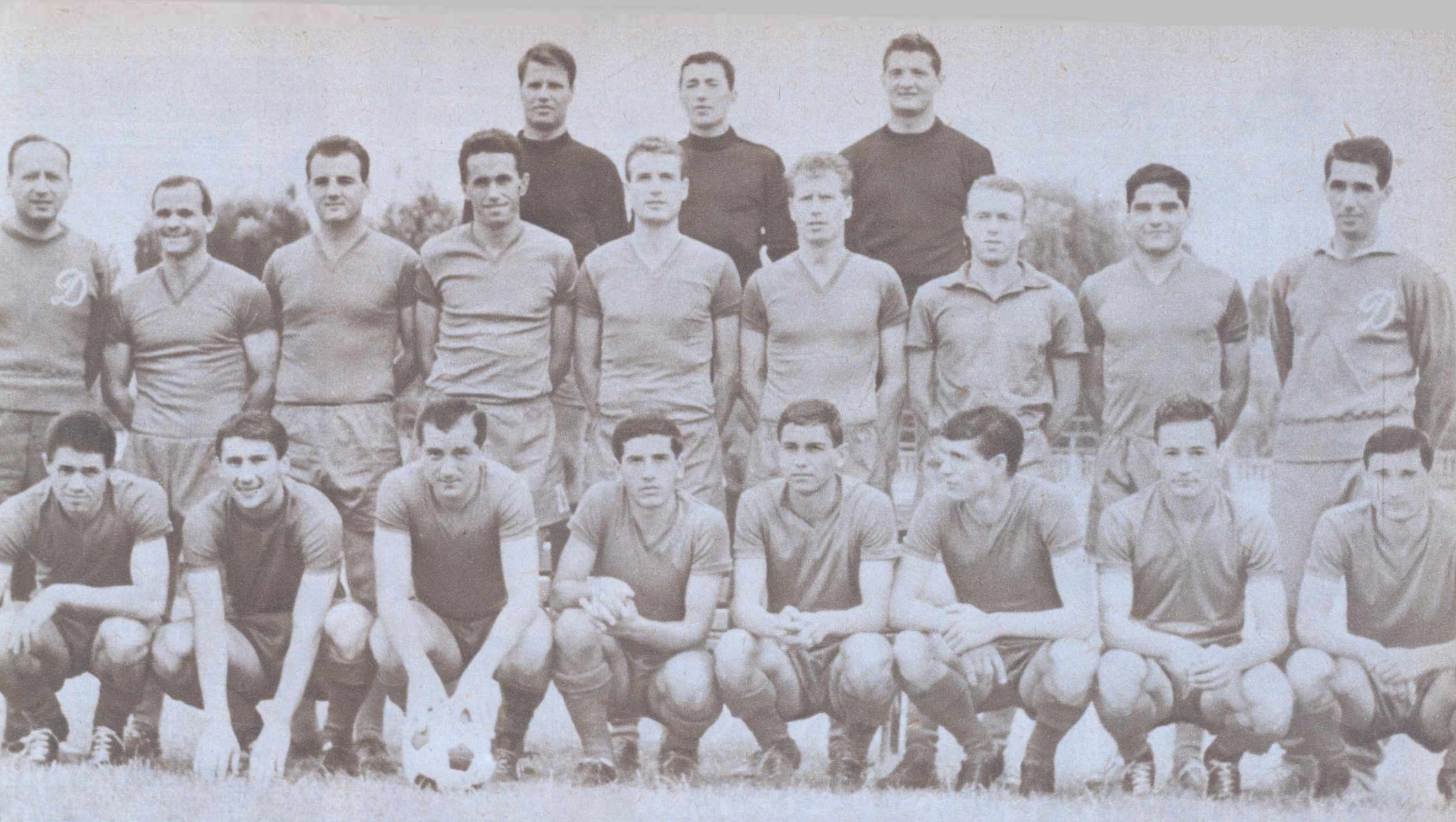
Lucescu (fourth from the right, below) with Dinamo București in the 1964–65 season

Lucescu was born on 29 July 1945 in Bucharest, Romania, and was part of a family of five children. He began playing junior-level football in 1961 at Școala Sportivă 2 București. Coach Traian Ionescu brought him to Dinamo București, where he made his Divizia A debut on 21 June 1964 in a 5–2 victory against Rapid București. Lucescu won the championship in his first two seasons with Dinamo, playing a total of three Divizia A games. He was loaned for the following two seasons to Divizia B club Știința București.

After the loan ended, he returned to play for The Red Dogs, winning the 1967–68 Cupa României, scoring a double in the 3–1 victory in the final against Rapid București after coach Bazil Marian sent him in the 77th minute to replace Nicolae Nagy. In the following three editions of the Cupa României, the club would reach the final in each of them, Lucescu scoring a brace in the 1971 final, but they were all lost to rivals Steaua București. Lucescu would also win another four league titles. In the first one he worked with coaches Nicolae Dumitru and Ionescu who gave him 23 appearances in which he scored three goals. In the following one Ion Nunweiller used him in 28 matches in which he netted a personal record of 12 goals. In the third edition, he scored four times in 31 games while working with Dumitru, and in the final one, he played 19 games, netting seven goals under Nunweiller's guidance. Lucescu had a total of 12 seasons spent at Dinamo, in which he appeared in 250 Divizia A games and scored 57 goals, including nine in the derby against Steaua.

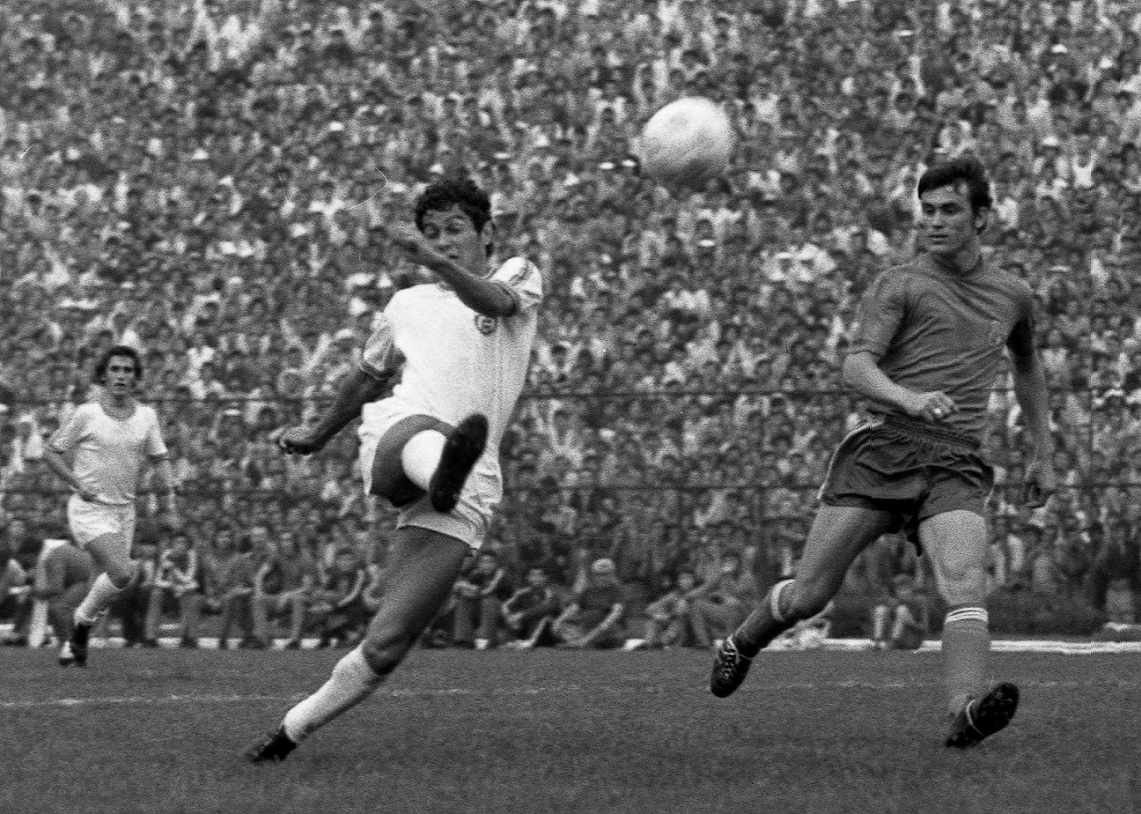
Lucescu (foreground, in white) in a derby match against cross-town rivals Steaua București.

During these years, Lucescu also played 15 games in which he scored three goals in European competitions (including three appearances in the Inter-Cities Fairs Cup). He scored against each of the Madrid giants Real and Atlético in the European Cup, but on both occasions, Dinamo failed to advance past the Spanish sides. For the way he played in 1971, Lucescu was placed fourth in the ranking for the Romanian Footballer of the Year award, and in 1974, he was second.

In July 1977, Lucescu joined Corvinul Hunedoara, where he became the team's coach in January 1979, while still an active player. The team was relegated to Divizia B at the end of the season, but Lucescu remained with the club, helping it gain promotion back to the first division after just one year. He played a key role in helping the club finish third in the 1981–82 Divizia A season, retiring from playing at the end of that campaign to focus on his coaching career.

He came out of retirement while coaching Dinamo, as many of the team's players were called up to the Romania national team training camp to prepare for the 1990 World Cup. Thus, Lucescu registered himself as a player and on 16 May 1990, he entered the field in the 76th minute to replace Ionel Fulga in a 1–1 draw against Sportul Studențesc București. He was champion as both a player and a coach that season. At 44 years, 9 months and 17 days, he became the oldest player to appear in a Divizia A match, a competition in which he amassed a total of 362 matches and scored 78 goals.

Lucescu also received offers to play abroad. During the 1970s, he was linked with moves to foreign clubs but was prevented by the Romanian communist regime. In February 1970, while the national team toured Brazil for the Torneio Internacional do Rio de Janeiro, the president of Fluminense sent an official request to the Romanian authorities in May 1970 to sign Lucescu on loan. The offer was rejected, as the regime considered athletes national assets and political symbols, rarely allowing them to move abroad; footballers were seen as ambassadors of socialist success, expected to glorify Romania internationally while remaining under state control and prohibited from representing foreign clubs abroad. Lucescu was later linked with Turkish side Fenerbahçe on two occasions. In July 1971, he appeared in an All Stars testimonial match honoring Fenerbahçe legend Ogün Altıparmak, marking the club's initial interest in signing him. In August 1976, he wore a Fenerbahçe jersey in a friendly against Dnipropetrovsk; a formal transfer was reportedly agreed, but the authorities blocked the move.

== International career ==
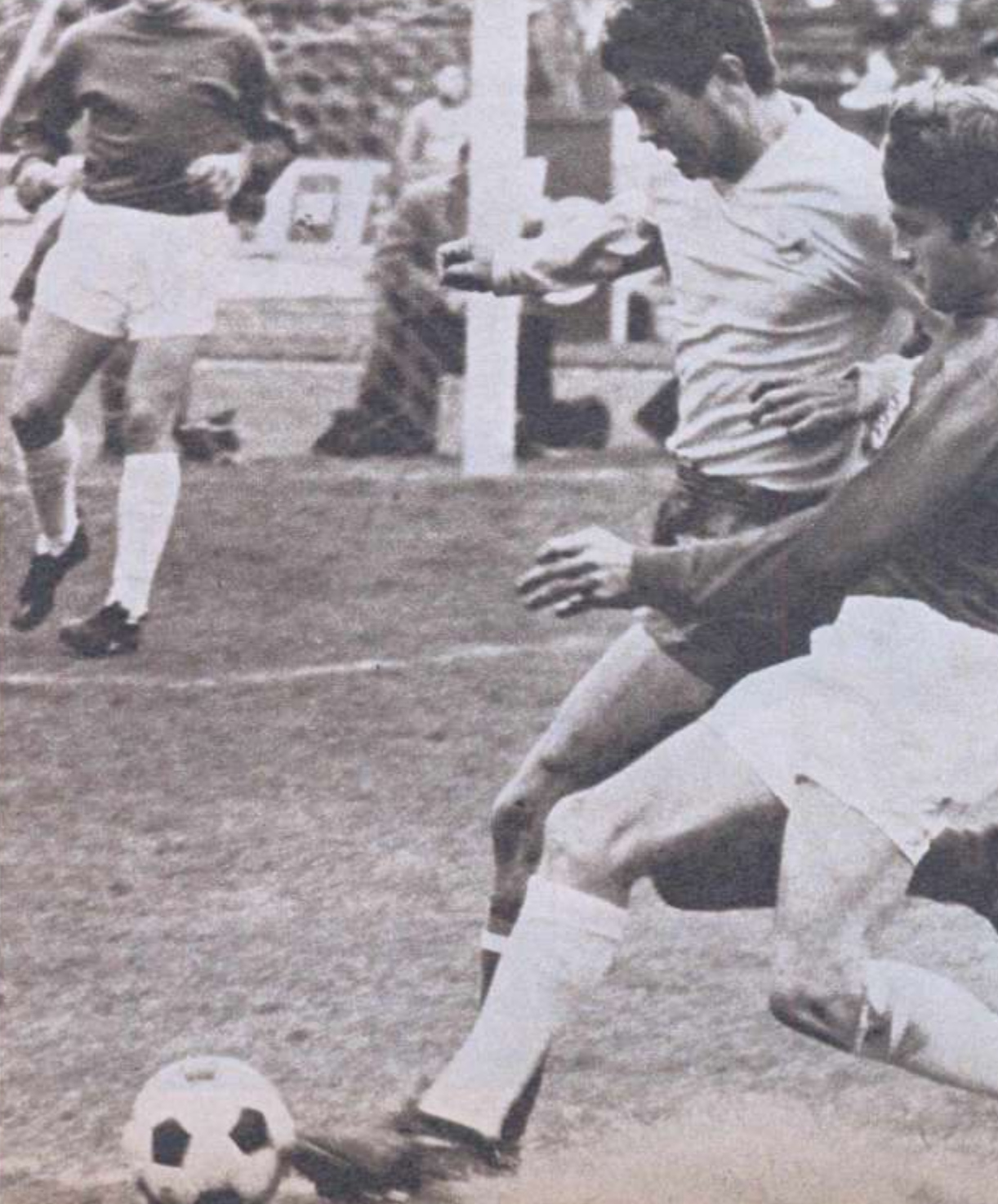
Lucescu in a duel with Keith Newton during Romania's 0–0 friendly against England on 6 November 1968

Lucescu made a total of 64 appearances for Romania, serving as captain in 23 of them and scoring nine goals. He made his debut under coach Ilie Oană on 2 November 1966, in a 4–2 victory against Switzerland during the Euro 1968 qualifiers. In those qualifiers, he made a total of six appearances and scored two goals across the two victories against Cyprus. He earned his first 10 caps for the national team while playing at Divizia B level for Știința București.

Lucescu played six games in the successful 1970 World Cup qualifiers. He was used by coach Angelo Niculescu as captain in all three matches in the final tournament which were a win against Czechoslovakia and losses to defending champions England and eventual winners Brazil, as his side failed to progress from their group. For the last game against Brazil, Lucescu bought the team's blue equipment with his own money, because the Romanian Football Federation provided just one set of equipment which was yellow, the same color as the Brazilians. After that match, he exchanged shirts with Pelé.

He played seven matches and scored two goals during the 1972 Euro qualifiers, managing to reach the quarter-finals where Romania was defeated by Hungary, who advanced to the final tournament. In the following years, Lucescu played two games in the 1974 World Cup qualifiers, three matches in which he scored one goal in a 3–1 victory against Greece during the 1973–76 Balkan Cup and made six appearances in which he netted a goal in a 6–1 win over Denmark in the Euro 1976 qualifiers. He made his last appearance for the national team on 4 April 1979 in a 2–2 draw against Spain during the Euro 1980 qualifiers.

On 25 March 2008, for representing his country at the 1970 World Cup, Lucescu was decorated by then-president Traian Băsescu with the Ordinul "Meritul Sportiv" – (The Medal "The Sportive Merit") class III.

== Managerial career ==
=== Corvinul Hunedoara ===
Lucescu learned many things about coaching from Viorel Mateianu, being very impressed by his working methods. He would go to study his training sessions at FC Baia Mare, sometimes asking Mateianu to extend them so he could see more of his methods. He would also go to his home where they would talk all night about football and draw tactical game schemes together.

Lucescu started coaching while still an active player at Corvinul Hunedoara in January 1979, when he replaced Ilie Savu. His first match took place on 28 February 1979 in the round of 32 of the 1978–79 Cupa României, losing with 3–1 after extra time to Divizia B club Metalul București. Three days later, he made his Divizia A debut in a 2–0 victory against Politehnica Iași in which he scored a goal. However, the team was relegated at the end of the season to Divizia B, but Lucescu stayed with the club, helping it gain promotion back to the first division after one year. Then he helped the club finish third in the 1981–82 Divizia A, after which he left them to focus on his work at the national team, which he was coaching simultaneously since November 1981. During his time at Corvinul, Lucescu demonstrated his ability to discover and promote young players such as Ioan Andone, Mircea Rednic, Michael Klein, Dorin Mateuț and Romulus Gabor.

=== Romania ===
Lucescu's debut as Romania's head coach took place on 11 November 1981 in a 0–0 draw against Switzerland in the 1982 World Cup qualifiers. He qualified the team to Euro 1984 by winning a qualification group composed of Czechoslovakia, Sweden, Cyprus and 1982 World Cup winner, Italy, earning a 0–0 away draw and a 1–0 home victory against the latter. In the final tournament, which was composed of eight teams, Romania earned a point after a 1–1 draw against Spain, but lost the other two games to West Germany and Portugal, thus failing to progress from their group. He was close to earning qualification for the 1986 World Cup, finishing just one point below second place, Northern Ireland. Lucescu left after a 4–0 victory against Austria in the Euro 1988 qualifiers that took place on 10 September 1986. He is also the coach that gave Gheorghe Hagi his national team debut at age 18 in a 0–0 friendly draw against Norway, and also gave him the captain's armband at the age of 20.

=== Dinamo București ===
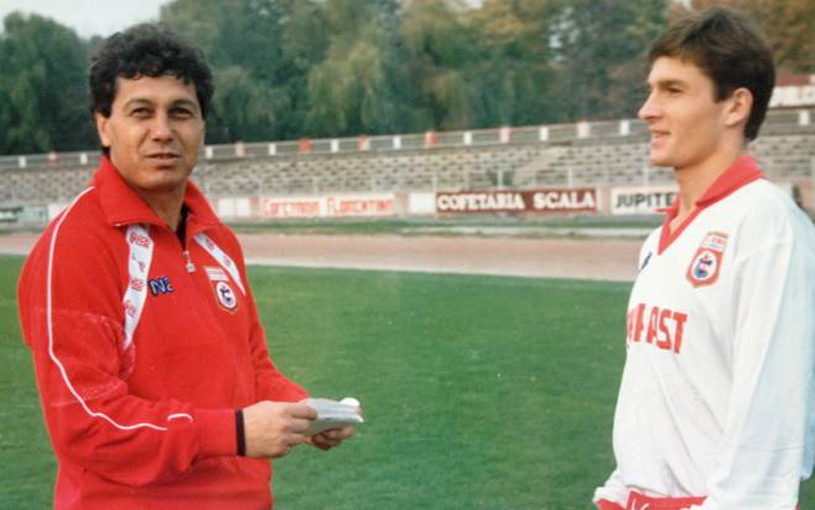
Lucescu (left) instructing Ioan Sabău during a Dinamo training session

Lucescu was named coach at Dinamo București in November 1985, while still working for Romania's national team. At the end of his first season spent at the club, he managed to win a Cupa României with a 1–0 victory in the final against Steaua București, their rival and recent European Cup winner. Over the course of almost five years, Lucescu created a team by promoting players from the club's youth center, including Bogdan Stelea, Ionuț Lupescu and Florin Răducioiu, transferred young players like Dănuț Lupu and Ioan Sabău, mixing them with players he coached at Corvinul such as Ioan Andone, Mircea Rednic, Michael Klein and Dorin Mateuț. Thus he created a team that reached the quarter-finals of the 1988–89 European Cup Winners' Cup, where they were eliminated on the away goals rule after 1–1 on aggregate by Sampdoria. In the following season they won the Divizia A title and the Cupa României after another win over Steaua in the final. They also reached the semi-finals of the 1989–90 European Cup Winners' Cup, where they were eliminated 2–0 on aggregate by Anderlecht.

While coaching Dinamo, on 27 March 1989, Lucescu was one of the three coaches alongside Artur Jorge and Nils Liedholm for the Rest of the World XI in the farewell match of Brazilian footballer Zico at Stadio Friuli in Udine. The Rest of the World XI won 2–1 against the Brazil national team.

=== Pisa ===
After the 1989 Romanian Revolution, Lucescu moved to Italy in the summer of 1990 to take charge of the newly promoted Serie A club Pisa. The 1990–91 season marked Pisa's return to Serie A, widely regarded at the time as the strongest league in the world. Lucescu's task was clear but extremely difficult to keep the newly promoted side in Serie A. The club struggled throughout the season due to limited squad depth and a lack of top-tier Serie A quality, relying mainly on promotion-level professionals and several international players, including a young Diego Simeone and José Chamot, both in their first experience in European football, and Danish international Henrik Larsen. After a good start, in round six they suffered a 6–3 defeat to Inter Milan, which marked the beginning of problems between Lucescu and the club's president, Romeo Anconetani. Despite these players, the team finished near the bottom of the table and were relegated back to Serie B after one season.

At Pisa, Lucescu met Adriano Bacconi, a fitness trainer whom he tasked with recording statistical data on players during matches. This method, which Lucescu had previously used at Corvinul, allowed him to gather detailed performance data on players. The two later worked together at Brescia, where in 1994, they each invested $35,000 to create FARM (Football Athletic Results Manager), one of the earliest software data monitoring systems in football. The program was developed by Giuliano Meini, with Lucescu and Bacconi providing the concept. After its initial development, they founded the company Digital Soccer Project to further develop and distribute the pioneering tool. In 1996, Lucescu left the venture, and Bacconi retained full ownership, later selling it to Panini for €2 million.

=== Brescia ===
Lucescu signed for Serie B club Brescia in July 1991, leading the team to promotion to Serie A after just one season. Following their elevation to the top flight, Brescia recorded notable victories against several top clubs, including an away win over AS Roma and home wins against Juventus, Napoli, Sampdoria and Lazio. However, at the end of the 1992–93 season, the club were relegated after losing a relegation play-off against Udinese. During this period, the club earned the nickname "Brescia Rumena", as Lucescu brought several Romanian players to the squad, including Gheorghe Hagi, Florin Răducioiu, Dorin Mateuț, Ioan Sabău and Dănuț Lupu, in a similar fashion to AC Milan's Dutch core (Marco van Basten, Ruud Gullit, Frank Rijkaard) and Inter Milan's German contingent (Lothar Matthäus, Andreas Brehme, Jürgen Klinsmann). The club secured promotion again the following season and also won the 1993–94 Anglo-Italian Cup at Wembley Stadium in London. They were relegated from Serie A once more in the subsequent campaign, and Lucescu was dismissed and replaced by Adelio Moro. He was later reappointed to manage the side in Serie B, but was again sacked due to inconsistent results. Lucescu also promoted 15-year-old Andrea Pirlo to train with the first team, although he was unable to give him a senior debut, as Italian Football Federation regulations at the time did not permit players of that age to compete in senior matches.

=== Reggiana ===
In July 1996, Lucescu signed with Serie A club Reggiana, after Carlo Ancelotti left for Parma. He had under his command players such as Georges Grün, Ioan Sabău, Adolfo Valencia and Igor Simutenkov. However, his spell lasted only until November 1996, when he was dismissed after nine matches due to inconsistent results and replaced by Francesco Oddo. The team eventually finished the season in last place.

=== Rapid București ===
In July 1997, Lucescu returned to Romania, coaching at Rapid București where he formed a team by promoting young players such as Bogdan Lobonț, Răzvan Raț and Daniel Pancu, mixing them with players he coached in the past like Dănuț Lupu, Ioan Sabău and Mircea Rednic. Their first performance was securing the 1997–98 Cupa României after a 1–0 win over Universitatea Craiova in the final. Then after a short spell at Inter Milan, he came back to Rapid, winning the 1998–99 Divizia A, which was the first championship title won by the club after 32 years. The Railwaymen also won the 1999 Supercupa României after a 5–0 victory against rivals Steaua București.

=== Inter Milan ===
In December 1998, Lucescu was named head coach at Inter Milan, working with players such as Ronaldo, Roberto Baggio, Youri Djorkaeff, Andrea Pirlo, Javier Zanetti and Ivan Zamorano. They managed to reach the quarter-finals of the 1998–99 Champions League, being eliminated 3–1 on aggregate by Alex Ferguson's Manchester United, who eventually won the competition. He left the club in March 1999, one of the reasons being a conflict with Ronaldo.

=== Galatasaray ===
In June 2000, he replaced Fatih Terim at Turkish club Galatasaray, with whom, alongside Romanian players Gheorghe Hagi and Gheorghe Popescu, he won the 2000 UEFA Super Cup, after a 2–1 win against Real Madrid. Under Lucescu's leadership, Galatasaray reached the quarter-finals of the 2000–01 Champions League season, where after a 3–2 victory in the first leg against Real Madrid, they lost the second leg 3–0. The following year, Galatasaray qualified to the second group phase of the Champions League and won the Turkish League title. Lucescu was sacked at the end of the season, despite winning the league championship, and was replaced by Fatih Terim.

=== Beşiktaş ===
Shortly after his departure from Galatasaray in June 2002, Lucescu signed a contract with rivals Beşiktaş. It was a very important season for Beşiktaş as in 2003, the Turkish club was celebrating its 100th year since its foundation. He managed to win the Turkish title, having only one loss and collecting 85 points – a record points tally in a single Süper Lig season. The team also reached the 2002–03 UEFA Cup quarter-finals, losing with 3–1 on aggregate to Lazio.

In the following season, the team could not progress from a difficult Champions League group, but was able to get a ticket to the 2003–04 UEFA Cup by finishing third in its group – only to be knocked out by Valencia in the third round, who eventually won the competition. On 25 January 2004, during a home game against Samsunspor, referee Cem Papila showed five red cards to Beşiktaş players. After this match, the team's performance declined drastically, Lucescu blamed the Turkish Football Federation for one-sided decisions by the referees. He left the club after finishing the championship in third place, claiming that it was stolen. During the period spent at Beşiktaş, he brought Romanian players Daniel Pancu, Adrian Ilie and Marius Măldărășanu to the club.

=== Shakhtar Donetsk ===
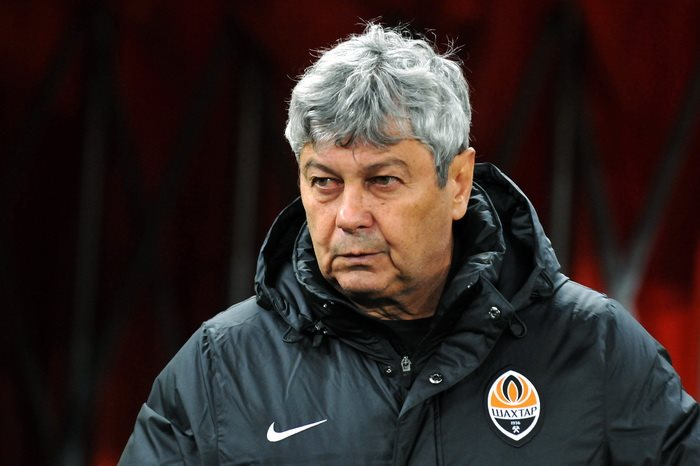
Lucescu coaching Shakhtar Donetsk in a Ukrainian Premier League match against Arsenal Kyiv, October 2013.

In May 2004, Lucescu joined Ukrainian side Shakhtar Donetsk and led their rise to prominence in Ukraine the following years. His first trophy with the club came in the 2003–04 Ukrainian Cup, defeating Dnipro Dnipropetrovsk 2–0 in the final on 30 May. In his first full season with the club, he secured the 2004–05 Premier League title.

The following season, he secured both the Premier League and the Super Cup. He failed to win any trophies the following season, however, though he made up for it in the 2007–08 season, winning the Premier League title and the Ukrainian Cup. His only domestic success in the 2008–09 season came in the Super Cup, although he was able to guide Shakhtar to their first ever European trophy, winning the last UEFA Cup before it was renamed the UEFA Europa League. He won the final against Werder Bremen 2–1 after extra time.

The 2009–10 season saw Shakhtar regain the Premier League title. The 2010–11 season was very successful for Lucescu. He guided Shakhtar to a domestic treble, winning the Premier League, the Ukrainian Cup and the Super Cup. They also had their most successful Champions League campaign, reaching the quarter-final stage before being defeated by eventual winners Barcelona.

The following season saw Shakhtar retain their Premier League and Ukrainian Cup titles. This gave Lucescu his sixth Premier League and fourth Ukrainian Cup with the club. Shakhtar had a disappointing Champions League campaign, finishing in fourth place in their group. His son, Răzvan Lucescu, is a former goalkeeper who at several points managed Rapid București, a team his father had also previously managed. Coincidentally, Shakhtar and Rapid met in the group stage of the UEFA Cup, the duel was disputed in only one leg at Donetsk in November 2005 ending with 1–0 win for Rapid.

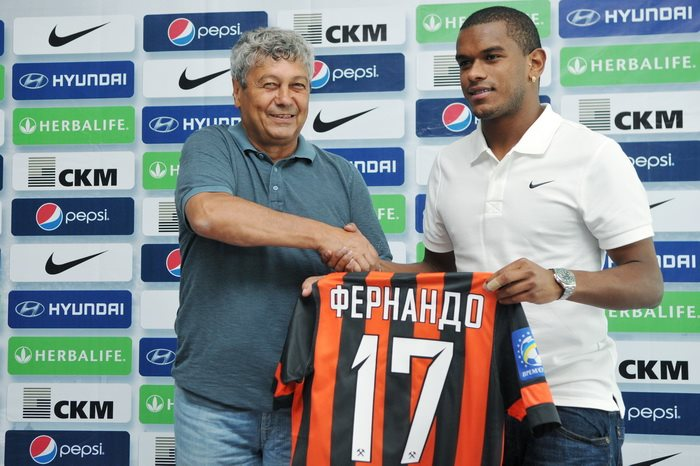
Lucescu presenting Fernando in 2013, one of a large number of Brazilians to sign for Shakhtar during his spell.

On 22 May 2009, Lucescu received the National Order "Cross of Romania" in the rank of Knight from Romanian president Traian Băsescu, as a recognition of his coaching career, highlighted by winning the 2009 UEFA Cup in Istanbul. On 29 May 2009, he was also awarded the title of Honorary citizen of Donetsk by the city council, in recognition of his contribution to the development and promotion of Ukrainian football and for raising the profile of Donetsk and Ukraine internationally.

In December 2009, he turned down an offer to coach the Ukraine national team, his reason being to avoid another potential clash with his son, Răzvan, who then managed the Romania national team and could qualify for UEFA Euro 2012, which Ukraine was to host.

Mircea Lucescu is the best coach in the world. He achieved results everywhere he went and knows how to adapt to every situation. He is a man of immense culture and a very humble person.

— Luciano Spalletti, Italian coach

Lucescu won the Coach of the Year award in Ukraine in 2006, 2008, 2009, 2010, 2011, 2012, 2013 and 2014.

He led Shakhtar into the semi-finals of Europa League during his last season in charge, being eliminated by defending champions and eventual winners Sevilla. He announced his resignation in early 2016, ending a 12-year period in charge of Shakhtar and becoming the club's greatest manager. In his last match in charge, he won the 2015–16 Ukrainian Cup after defeating Zorya Luhansk 2–0 in the final.

Early in his time at Shakhtar, Lucescu had Romanians Flavius Stoican, Cosmin Bărcăuan, Daniel Florea, Ciprian Marica and Răzvan Raț under his command, but only the latter stayed with him to win the 2008–09 UEFA Cup. In later years he relied heavily on young Brazilian players such as Willian, Fernandinho, Douglas Costa, Luiz Adriano, Elano, Alex Teixeira, Ilsinho, Jádson, Brandão or Matuzalém.

=== Zenit Saint Petersburg ===
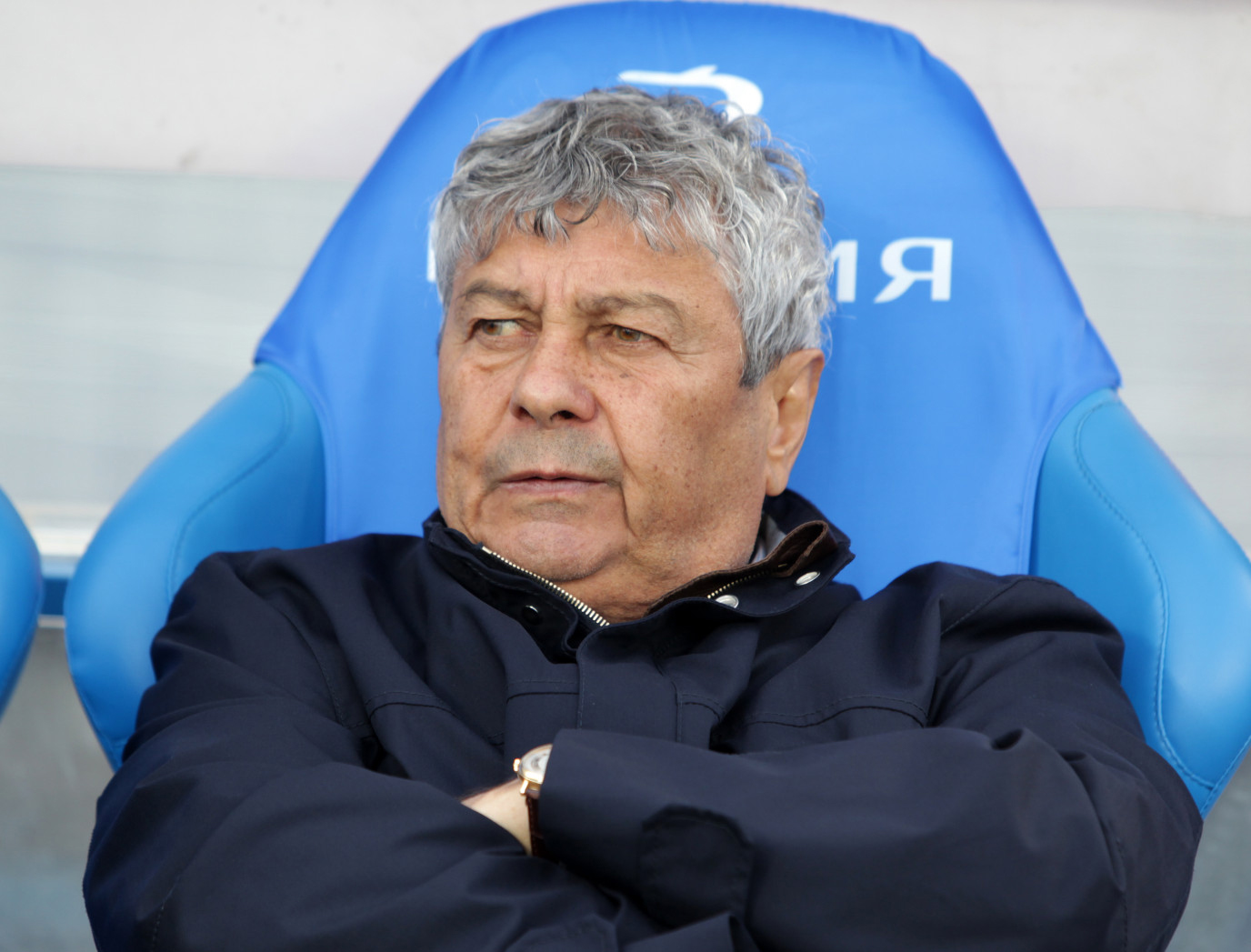
Lucescu with Zenit in 2017

On 24 May 2016, Lucescu agreed to a two-year deal with Russian club Zenit Saint Petersburg, with an extension option for another year. He won the 2016 Russian Super Cup after a 1–0 victory against CSKA Moscow. However, he was dismissed roughly one year later, as Zenit failed to qualify for the Champions League after finishing third in the Russian Premier League.

=== Turkey ===
On 2 August 2017, he was appointed the new head coach of Turkey, succeeding Fatih Terim. On his debut a month later, he lost 2–0 away to Ukraine in 2018 FIFA World Cup qualification. The team failed to qualify for the World Cup, with their campaign ending with a 3–0 home loss to Iceland in the penultimate fixture on 6 October.

In the inaugural season of the UEFA Nations League, Turkey were relegated to League C in November 2018. The following February, his contract was terminated by mutual consent. During his tenure as coach of the Turkey national team, Lucescu debuted several players, notably Zeki Çelik, Merih Demiral, and İrfan Can Kahveci.

=== Dynamo Kyiv ===
On 23 July 2020, Lucescu returned to Ukraine after signing a two-year contract with the main rival of his former club Shakhtar Donetsk, Dynamo Kyiv. His spell started in a controversial way, as he attempted to resign from his position after only a couple of days. The reason behind his actions was that Dynamo Kyiv fans fiercely protested the decision to hire Lucescu because of his long-term spell at Shakhtar. Dynamo president Ihor Surkis initially told press that he knew nothing about the resignation, and later that day both sides confirmed that their cooperation will in fact continue.

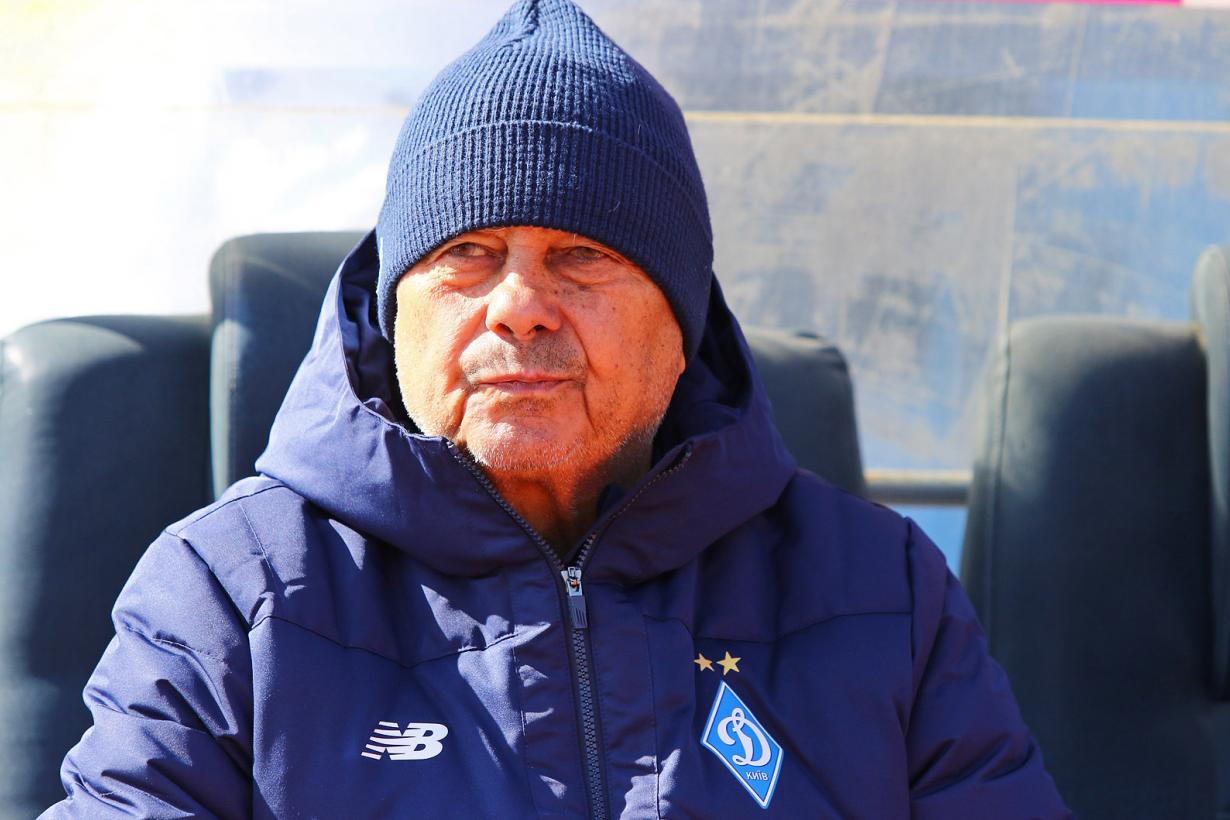
Lucescu as Dynamo Kyiv manager in 2023

On 20 October, in Dynamo Kyiv's opening Champions League match of the season against Juventus, Lucescu became the oldest manager to take charge of a game in the competition, at the age of 75 years and 83 days; The match ended in a 2–0 home loss. Lucescu secured his first league title with Dynamo Kyiv on 25 April, following a 5–0 victory against Inhulets, and on 13 May he secured the double with a 1–0 win over Zorya Luhansk in the 2021 Ukrainian Cup Final. In his first season at the club, he transferred compatriot Tudor Băluță on a one-season loan from Brighton & Hove Albion.

Lucescu was living in Kyiv in February 2022 when Russia invaded Ukraine. He initially wanted to stay put, but fled to his homeland on the advice of the Romanian embassy, as a way to help Dynamo's foreign players get to safety.

On 3 November 2023, Lucescu announced that he would step down as the manager of Dynamo Kyiv after a 1–0 home defeat against their rivals Shakhtar Donetsk, and on the following day he was succeeded by Oleksandr Shovkovskyi.

=== Return to Romania ===
On 6 August 2024, Lucescu returned as the head coach of the Romania national team, 38 years after his first tenure. His first match in charge was on 6 September, an away 3–0 victory against Kosovo in the Nations League C. He ultimately won the Nations league group, winning all six matches and achieving promotion to the Nations League B. In the qualifiers for the 2026 World Cup, Romania ultimately underperformed, losing at home and away to Bosnia and drawing against Cyprus, leading to Lucescu's team missing out on both direct qualification and an easier play-off route for the World Cup.

On 26 March 2026, Romania was eliminated from World Cup contention following a 1–0 defeat to Turkey in the play-off semi-finals held in Istanbul, extending Romania's absence from the FIFA World Cup to seven consecutive tournaments, dating back to 1998.

On 2 April 2026, Lucescu resigned as the head coach of Romania after being hospitalized on 29 March for heart arrhythmia following a training session.

== Personal life and death ==
Lucescu often described football as central to his life and expressed a desire to remain involved in the game for as long as possible. In a 2010 interview, he said: "To die on the pitch is the most beautiful thing that can happen to a coach. I would like to die on the field."

Lucescu was a polyglot. He spoke English, Portuguese, Spanish, Italian, French and Russian in addition to his native Romanian. He often told his players that attending the theatre or reading a book is far more beneficial than visiting nightclubs or bars. He also pressured his players to go to a university. His son, Răzvan, was also a footballer, and is currently managing Greek club PAOK.

Lucescu joined the Romanian Humanist Party in March 2000.

On 15 July 2009, Lucescu suffered an episode of pre-infarct angina and underwent emergency surgery at a hospital in Donetsk.

Lucescu was involved in a road accident in Bucharest on 6 January 2012 and was seriously hurt.

On 3 April 2026, a day after his resignation, Lucescu was hospitalized after experiencing a cardiac emergency. Medical personnel reportedly gave him emergency resuscitation and several rounds of cardiac massage to stabilize his condition. Despite these efforts, his health worsened because of severe arrhythmias that did not respond to the initial treatment. He was then transferred to the Intensive Care Unit (ICU) at the University Emergency Hospital Bucharest, where he was placed in a medically induced coma to aid his recovery.

On 7 April 2026, his death was announced in a press release by the University Emergency Hospital Bucharest. He had still been coaching two weeks prior. Lucescu was 80. Three days later, he was buried at Bellu Cemetery in Bucharest.

== Publications ==
In 1980, Lucescu briefly wrote chronicles, commentary, and match analysis for the Drumul Socialismului newspaper. He also authored two volumes on football:

- Mirajul gazonului (The Mirage of the Pitch) (1981)
- Shakhtarsʹke zhyttya (Miner's Life) (2011)

== Playing statistics ==
=== Club ===
Appearances and goals by club, season and competition
Club	Season	League			Cup		Europe		Total	
Club	Season	Division	Apps	Goals	Apps	Goals	Apps	Goals	Apps	Goals
Dinamo București	1963–64	Divizia A	2	0	0	0	–		2	0
Dinamo București	1964–65	Divizia A	1	0	0	0	–		1	0
Dinamo București	1967–68	Divizia A	17	1	5	2	–		22	3
Dinamo București	1968–69	Divizia A	28	8	6	5	1 (Note: Appearance in the UEFA Cup Winners' Cup)	0	35	13
Dinamo București	1969–70	Divizia A	24	4	2	0	–		26	4
Dinamo București	1970–71	Divizia A	23	3	6	2	3 (Note: Appearances in the Inter-Cities Fairs Cup)	0	32	5
Dinamo București	1971–72	Divizia A	26	7	4	2	3 (Note: Appearances in the European Cup)	0	33	9
Dinamo București	1972–73	Divizia A	28	12	2	1	–		30	13
Dinamo București	1973–74	Divizia A	25	5	1	0	2	1	28	6
Dinamo București	1974–75	Divizia A	31	4	1	0	3 (Note: Appearances in the UEFA Cup)	1	35	5
Dinamo București	1975–76	Divizia A	26	6	1	0	2	1	29	7
Dinamo București	1976–77	Divizia A	19	7	1	0	1	0	21	7
Dinamo București	Total		250	57	29	12	15	3	294	72
Știința București (loan)	1965–66	Divizia B	11	2			–		11	2
Știința București (loan)	1966–67	Divizia B	28	10			–		28	10
Știința București (loan)	Total		39	12					39	12
Corvinul Hunedoara	1977–78	Divizia A	34	7	2	0	–		36	7
Corvinul Hunedoara	1978–79	Divizia A	27	5	1	0	–		28	5
Corvinul Hunedoara	1979–80	Divizia B	30	5			–		30	5
Corvinul Hunedoara	1980–81	Divizia A	27	7	2	1	–		29	8
Corvinul Hunedoara	1981–82	Divizia A	23	2	2	0	–		25	2
Corvinul Hunedoara	Total		141	26	7	1			148	27
Dinamo București	1989–90	Divizia A	1	0	0	0	–		1	0
Career total			431	95	36	13	15	3	482	111

=== International ===
List of international goals scored by Mircea Lucescu
Goal	Date	Venue	Opponent	Score	Result	Competition
1	3 December 1966	GCP Stadium, Nicosia, Cyprus	Cyprus	2–1	5–1	UEFA Euro 1968 qualifying
2	23 April 1967	Stadionul 23 August, Bucharest, Romania	Cyprus	1–0	7–0	UEFA Euro 1968 qualifying
3	9 February 1970	Estadio San Martín de Porres, Lima, Peru	Peru	1–0	1–1	Friendly
4	22 September 1971	Olympic Stadium, Helsinki, Finland	Finland	4–0	4–0	UEFA Euro 1972 qualifying
5	24 November 1971	Stadionul 23 August, Bucharest, Romania	Wales	2–0	2–0	UEFA Euro 1972 qualifying
6	29 May 1974	Stadionul 23 August, Bucharest, Romania	Greece	3–1	3–1	1973–76 Balkan Cup
7	19 March 1975	İnönü Stadium, Istanbul, Turkey	Turkey	1–1	1–1	Friendly
8	11 May 1975	Stadionul 23 August, Bucharest, Romania	Denmark	5–0	6–1	UEFA Euro 1976 qualifying
9	5 June 1976	San Siro, Milan, Italy	Italy	1–2	2–4	Friendly

== Managerial statistics ==
As of match played 26 March 2026

Managerial record by team and tenure
Team	From	To	Record							
Team	From	To	G	W	D	L	GF	GA	GD	Win %
Corvinul Hunedoara	January 1979	June 1982	125	64	16	45	259	169	+90	51.20
Romania	1 November 1981	2 October 1986	58	24	19	15	77	63	+14	41.38
Dinamo București	1 November 1985	30 June 1990	177	132	28	17	494	167	+327	74.58
Pisa	1 July 1990	11 March 1991	24	8	5	11	32	49	−17	33.33
Brescia	1 July 1991	19 February 1995	151	47	59	45	197	188	+9	31.13
Brescia	1 July 1995	25 February 1996	29	7	9	13	32	36	−4	24.14
Reggiana	1 July 1996	25 November 1996	13	1	4	8	13	22	−9	7.69
Rapid București	1 July 1997	25 November 1998	57	41	11	5	122	42	+80	71.93
Inter Milan	1 December 1998	21 March 1999	17	4	4	9	26	26	+0	23.53
Rapid București	1 April 1999	30 June 2000	49	32	9	8	103	49	+54	65.31
Galatasaray	1 July 2000	30 June 2002	106	64	22	20	210	111	+99	60.38
Beşiktaş	1 July 2002	17 May 2004	89	53	19	17	162	98	+64	59.55
Shakhtar Donetsk	17 May 2004	24 May 2016	573	395	90	88	1,220	452	+768	68.94
Zenit Saint Petersburg	24 May 2016	28 May 2017	40	25	7	8	74	34	+40	62.50
Turkey	2 August 2017	11 February 2019	17	4	6	7	17	25	−8	23.53
Dynamo Kyiv	23 July 2020	3 November 2023	126	70	21	35	216	126	+90	55.56
Romania	6 August 2024	2 April 2026	17	11	1	5	39	18	+21	64.71
Total			1,668	982	330	356	3,293	1,675	+1618	58.87

=== Managing Shakhtar ===
Managerial record by competition
Competition	Games	Won	Draw	Lost	GF	GA
Ukrainian Premier League	357	273	49	35	817	234
Ukrainian Cup	71	57	7	7	175	45
Ukrainian Super Cup	11	5	4	2	22	12
Europe	134	60	30	44	206	161
Total	573	395	90	88	1220	452

== Honours ==
=== Player ===
Dinamo București

- Divizia A: 1963–64, 1964–65, 1970–71, 1972–73, 1974–75, 1976–77, 1989–90
- Cupa României: 1967–68

Corvinul Hunedoara

- Divizia B: 1979–80

Individual

- Romanian Footballer of the Year runner-up: 1974

=== Manager ===
Corvinul Hunedoara

- Divizia B: 1979–80

Romania

- Tournoi de Paris: 1983

Dinamo București

- Divizia A: 1989–90
- Cupa României: 1985–86, 1989–90

Brescia

- Serie B: 1991–92
- Anglo-Italian Cup: 1993–94

Rapid București

- Divizia A: 1998–99
- Cupa României: 1997–98
- Supercupa României: 1999

Galatasaray

- Süper Lig: 2001–02
- UEFA Super Cup: 2000

Beşiktaş

- Süper Lig: 2002–03

Shakhtar Donetsk

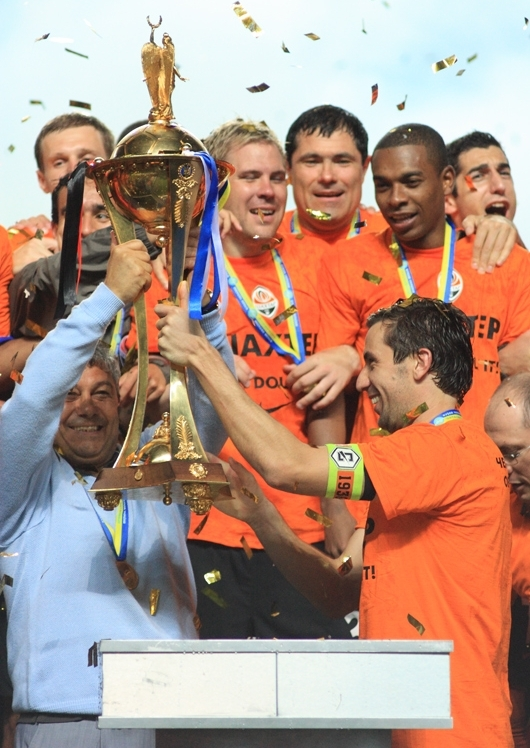
Lucescu lifting the 2010–11 Ukrainian Cup with Shakhtar Donetsk.

- Ukrainian Premier League: 2004–05, 2005–06, 2007–08, 2009–10, 2010–11, 2011–12, 2012–13, 2013–14
- Ukrainian Cup: 2003–04, 2007–08, 2010–11, 2011–12, 2012–13, 2015–16
- Ukrainian Super Cup: 2005, 2008, 2010, 2012, 2013, 2014, 2015
- UEFA Cup: 2008–09

Zenit Saint Petersburg

- Russian Super Cup: 2016

Dynamo Kyiv

- Ukrainian Premier League: 2020–21
- Ukrainian Cup: 2020–21
- Ukrainian Super Cup: 2020

Individual

- Romania Coach of the Year: 2004, 2010, 2012, 2014, 2021

Orders

- Order of Merit (Ukraine) III degree (2006)
- Order of The Sportive Merit (Romania) III degree (2008)
- Order of the Star of Romania (2009)
- Order of Merit (Ukraine) II degree (2009)
- Order of Merit (Ukraine) I degree (2011)
- Honorary Citizen of Donetsk

== See also ==
- List of longest managerial reigns in association football
- List of football managers with the most matches
- List of UEFA Super Cup winning managers
- List of UEFA Cup winning managers
