= Alexandru Boc =

Romanian footballer and actor

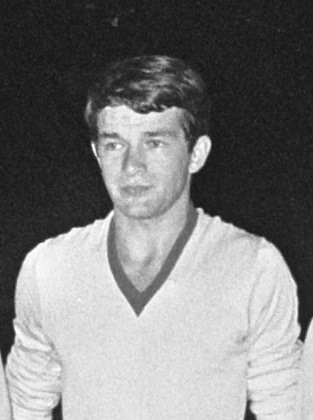
- Boc with Petrolul Ploiești in 1966

Personal information
- Date of birth: 3 June 1946 (age 80)
- Place of birth: Vașcău, Romania
- Height: 1.83 m (6 ft 0 in)
- Position: Defender

Senior career*
| Years | Team | Apps | (Gls) |
| 1964–1967 | Petrolul Ploiești | 48 | (1) |
| 1967–1969 | Dinamo București | 50 | (1) |
| 1970–1971 | Sportul Studențesc București | 9 | (0) |
| 1971–1973 | Rapid București | 50 | (7) |
| 1973–1976 | Universitatea Craiova | 76 | (3) |
| Total | | 233 | (12) |

International career
| 1967–1971 | Romania (Note: Including one appearance for Romania's Olympic team.) | 6 | (0) |
- * Club domestic league appearances and goals

Alexandru "Sandu" Boc (born 3 June 1946) is a retired Romanian footballer, who played as a defender.

== Club career ==
"The spectators stood up and applauded for five minutes after each intervention with the Oxford procedure that I had"

— Alexandru Boc, talking about himself

=== Petrolul Ploiești ===
Boc was born on 3 June 1946 in Vașcău, Romania and played football as a defender. He was known for often using the "Oxford procedure" for the public's delight which was letting the ball pass over or past him, and when the forward was about to gain possession of it, he would reach back and take it with the exterior side of the foot.

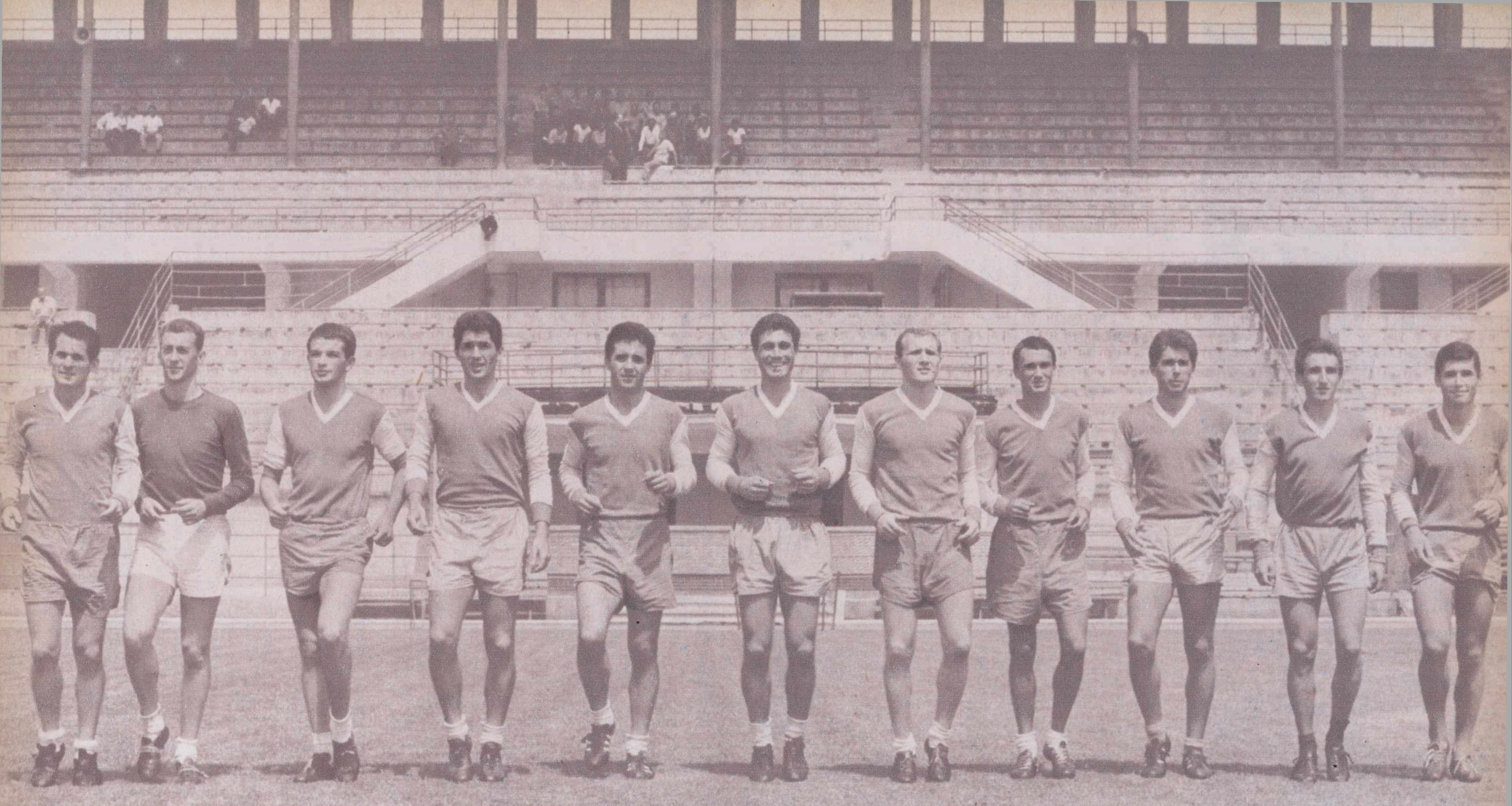
Boc (third from the left) during a Petrolul training session in 1966

Boc made his Divizia A debut on 11 October 1964, playing for Petrolul Ploiești under coach Ilie Oană in a 3–0 victory against CSMS Iași. In the following season he helped Petrolul win the 1965–66 Divizia A title, as coach Constantin Cernăianu used him in 26 matches in which he scored one goal. According to the Sportul newspaper, he was the player with the highest grade point average in the entire championship. Boc also played three games for The Yellow Wolves in the first round of the 1966–67 European Cup against Liverpool which included a 3–1 victory in which he scored a goal, but they did not manage to qualify to the next round.

=== Dinamo, Sportul and Rapid ===
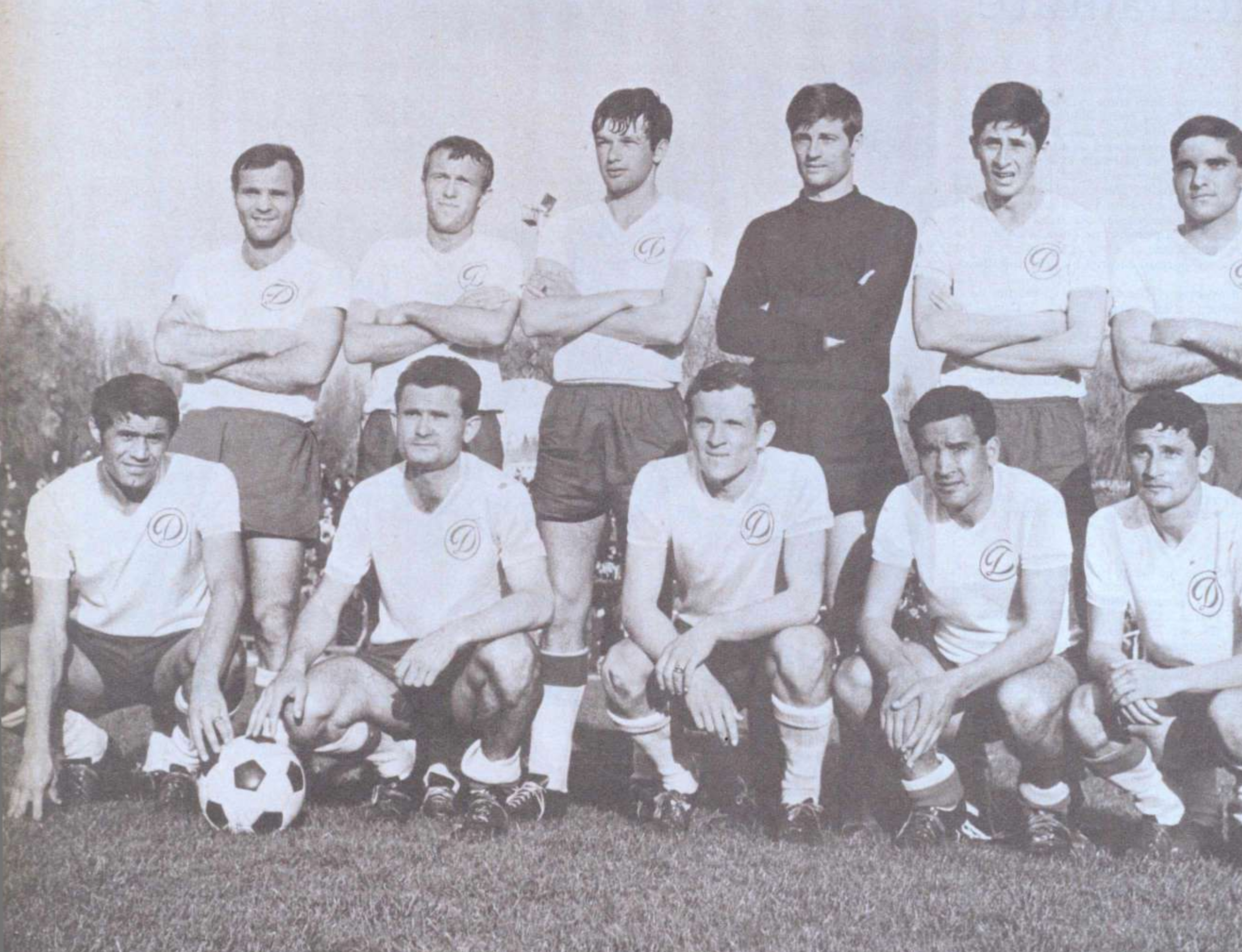
Boc (third from the left, back row) with Dinamo București in 1968

In 1967, he joined Dinamo București, helping the club win the 1967–68 Cupa României in his first season, but coach Bazil Marian did not use him in the 3–1 victory over Rapid București in the final. In the following season he scored once in a 4–2 win in a derby against Steaua București in the league. Afterwards he had one season in which he didn't play because he was in jail and another one spent in Divizia B at Sportul Studențesc București. He returned to play in Divizia A at Rapid București where he worked again with coach Bazil Marian, winning together the 1971–72 Cupa României, Boc playing the entire match in the 2–0 win over Jiul Petroșani in the final. Boc also made some European performances while playing for The Railwaymen. The first was during the 1971–72 UEFA Cup, where he played five matches as the team reached the round of 16 by eliminating Napoli and Legia Warsaw before falling to the eventual tournament winners, Tottenham. Subsequently, he participated in the 1972–73 European Cup Winners' Cup, playing four games, as they got past Landskrona BoIS and Rapid Wien—scoring once against the latter— to help the team reach the quarter-finals, though they were ultimately knocked out by the eventual finalists, Leeds United. For the way he played in 1972, Boc was placed second in the ranking for the Romanian Footballer of the Year award, being only behind Cornel Dinu.

=== Universitatea Craiova ===
He reunited with coach Cernăianu at Universitatea Craiova, their first performance was getting past Fiorentina in the first round of the 1973–74 UEFA Cup edition, being eliminated in the following one by Standard Liège. In the same season he helped "U" win the first championship title in its history, as Cernăianu gave him 32 appearances in which he scored one goal. In the last game of that season against Petrolul Ploiești which ended with a 0–0 draw, Boc received a grade 10 in the Sportul newspaper, as the team earned the point that mathematically made them champions. Boc made his last Divizia A appearance on 10 December 1975 in a 3–0 away loss to FCM Reșița, totaling 224 matches with 12 goals in the competition and 22 games with two goals in European competitions.

== International career ==
Boc played five matches for Romania, making his debut under coach Bazil Marian in a 1–1 friendly draw against Uruguay, which took place on 4 January 1967 in Montevideo at Estadio Gran Parque Central. He played in two victories against Switzerland and a 2–2 draw against Greece in the successful 1970 World Cup qualifiers. However, he missed the opportunity to be part of the squad that went to the final tournament, as he was in jail at that time. After Romania's 1–0 victory in Lausanne against Switzerland in the 1970 World Cup qualifiers, journalist Eugen Barbu praised Boc in the Flacăra magazine:"If Nicolae Ceaușescu would give Boc the right to play in Europe and sell him, he could build a city with the money!".

== Conviction ==
In 1969, during an evening spent at the Athenee Palace where he was staying with actor Cornel Patrichi, among others at a table, a man threw an empty cigarette pack in Patrichi's glass. A verbal confrontation between them started and Boc intervened and punched the man. Afterwards the man was beaten by other people, ending with his leg broken. The person beaten up was a Securitate captain, so Boc confessed what happened and took all the responsibility of the situation on himself, relying on his status as a football player at Dinamo București to avoid consequences but at the trial Patrichi sided with the captain. He was sentenced to a jail term of two years and a half, spending the first six months in a relaxed environment, having a telephone and a TV in his cell at the headquarters of the Militia Command in the center of Bucharest, where the minors were also imprisoned. After that period he was close to obtaining a pardon from his conviction, but the Securitate found out about the light detention he had. On 7 September 1970, the Central Committee of the Romanian Communist Party had a meeting to discuss his case where dictator Nicolae Ceaușescu himself participated. The Committee decided that he would not be granted the pardon, as member Vasile Patilineț who found out that his wife had an affair with Boc, insisted for this outcome. He was sent to the Văcărești prison, then moved to one of the toughest prisons in Romania, the Policolor colony where he was in an insanitary cell with many criminals. Boc had to wake up each day at 4 a.m. to work and every three hours a black Volga car with members of the Central Committee would come to verify if he works, looking at his hands to see if they have calluses. His teammates from Dinamo would send him food and money, Cornel Dinu personally going to deliver the packages to him. However, because he was not allowed to go inside the prison, Dinu would come through the back, entering through a cornfield to reach him at the prison's yard. After a total of 13 months spent in jail, Boc was released.

== Personal life ==
Boc was known for his success with women, being nicknamed "The ladies' man of Romanian football". He had relationships among others, with actresses Corina Chiriac and Aimée Iacobescu, and volleyball player Elena Butnaru. He was also engaged to Salomeea Djanhanghir, who was the granddaughter of the Shah of Iran, Mohammad Reza Pahlavi, the richest man on the planet at that time. The VIP magazine ranked Boc among the top five best Romanian men, a list that included Florin Piersic, Petre Roman, Ion Dichiseanu and Sergiu Nicolaescu. He was also an occasional film actor, playing alongside Romanian actors Toma Caragiu and Gheorghe Dinică in the 1975 comedy movie Nu filmăm să ne-amuzăm (We do not film to amuse ourselves) directed by Iulian Mihu.

In 2023, Boc received the Honorary Citizen of Craiova title.

== Honours ==
Petrolul Ploiești

- Divizia A: 1965–66

Dinamo București

- Cupa României: 1967–68

Rapid București

- Cupa României: 1971–72

Universitatea Craiova

- Divizia A: 1973–74

Individual

- Romanian Footballer of the Year (runner-up): 1972, (fifth place): 1974
