= Viorel Sălceanu =

Romanian footballer

Personal information
- Full name: Dan Viorel Sălceanu
- Date of birth: 1 March 1946 (age 80)
- Place of birth: Pașcani, Romania
- Position: Midfielder

Senior career*
Years	Team	Apps	(Gls)
1964–1967	CFR Pașcani		
1967	Politehnica Iași	12	(2)
1968–1974	Dinamo București	151	(24)
1975	FC Galați	16	(5)
1975–1977	FC Constanța	36	(3)
Total		215	(34)

International career
1968–1969	Romania U23	9	(0)
1971	Romania Olympic	2	(1)

Managerial career
- 1977–1978: Sirena București (assistant)
- 1980–1982: Inter Sibiu
- 1983–1984: Unirea Ocna Sibiului
- 1986: Unirea Alba Iulia
- 1991–1993: CFR Pașcani
- * Club domestic league appearances and goals as of 2 December 2025

Dan Viorel Sălceanu (born 1 March 1946) is a Romanian former footballer who played as a midfielder. Spending the majority of his playing career at Dinamo București, he later worked as a manager.

== Club career ==
Sălceanu was born on 1 March 1946 in Pașcani, Romania. He began playing football in 1964 at CFR Pașcani in Divizia B. In 1967, he went to play for Politehnica Iași, also in the second league. During the first half of the 1967–68 season, Sălceanu scored two goals in 12 league matches. However, he was transferred in the middle of the season to Dinamo București, but Politehnica still managed to gain first-league promotion at the end of the season without him.

Sălceanu made his Divizia A debut on 24 March 1968 when coach Bazil Marian sent him in the 55th minute to replace Radu Nunweiller in Dinamo's 2–1 win over Progresul București. His first achievement at Dinamo was winning the 1967–68 Cupa României, but coach Marian did not use him in the 3–1 victory in the final against Rapid București. In the following three editions of the Cupa României, the club would reach the final and Sălceanu would play in each of them, but they were all lost to rivals Steaua București. In the 1970–71 season, he won his first league title with the club, scoring eight goals in 26 matches under coaches Nicolae Dumitru and Traian Ionescu. During the same season, Sălceanu played four games in the Inter-Cities Fairs Cup, as they got past PAOK in the first round, being eliminated in the following one by Liverpool against whom he scored one goal. Subsequently, he helped his side eliminate Spartak Trnava in the first round of the 1971–72 European Cup, but got defeated in the next round by Feyenoord. The Red Dogs won another title in the 1972–73 season and he contributed by netting two goals in 17 matches under coach Ion Nunweiller. Afterwards, Sălceanu scored one goal to help his side eliminate Crusaders in the 1973–74 European Cup first round, but they were defeated 4–2 on aggregate by Atlético Madrid in the second round. In the first half of the 1974–75 season, he made five league appearances and scored once under coach Dumitru. He left the club in the middle of the season, but Dinamo still managed to win the championship at the end of it without him. During these years, Sălceanu scored four goals in the derby against Steaua which helped his side earn three league victories.

In 1975, Sălceanu joined FC Galați, but the club was relegated at season's end. He remained in first-league football, as he went to play for FC Constanța. There, Sălceanu made his last Divizia A appearance on 2 April 1977 in a 2–1 loss to Argeș Pitești, totaling 203 matches with 32 goals in the competition and 14 games with two goals in European competitions (including four matches and one goal in the Inter-Cities Fairs Cup).

== International career ==
From 1968 to 1969, Sălceanu was consistently featured for Romania's under-23 side. Subsequently, he played for Romania's Olympic team and scored one goal in the 4–2 aggregate win over Albania in the first round of the 1972 Summer Olympics qualifiers.

== Personal life ==
In 2014, Sălceanu was awarded the title of Honorary Citizen of the Municipality of Pașcani.

== Honours ==
Politehnica Iași

- Divizia B: 1967–68

Dinamo București

- Divizia A: 1970–71, 1972–73, 1974–75
- Cupa României: 1967–68, runner-up 1968–69, 1969–70, 1970–71
