= Gheorghe Grozea =

Romanian footballer

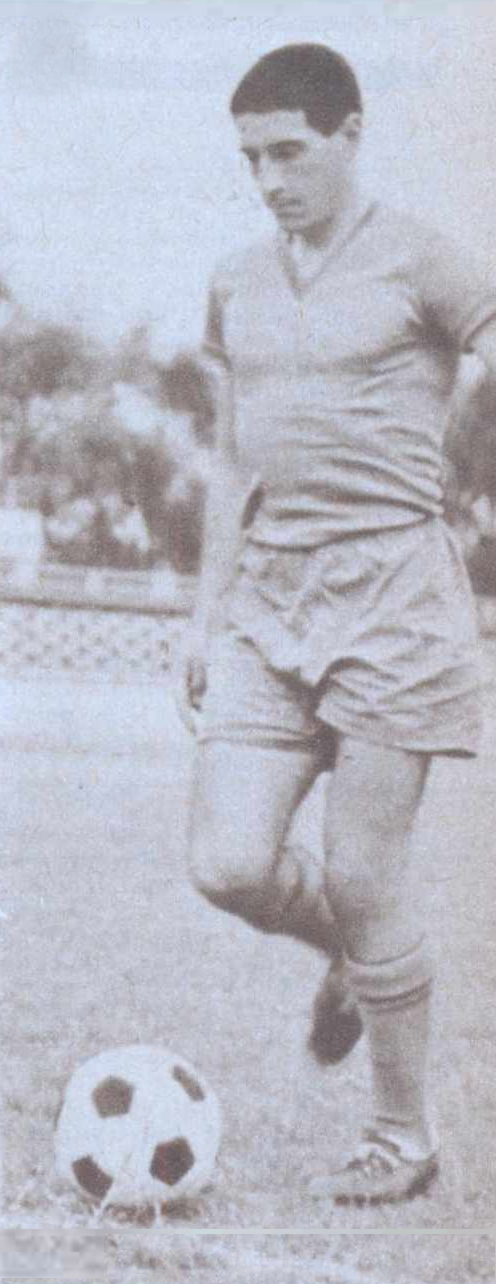

Personal information
- Date of birth: 12 January 1945 (age 81)
- Place of birth: Giurgiu, Romania
- Height: 1.70 m (5 ft 7 in)
- Position: Forward

Youth career
- 1958–1964: Olimpia Giurgiu

Senior career*
Years	Team	Apps	(Gls)
1964–1967	Dinamo București	24	(0)
1967–1972	Petrolul Ploiești	133	(32)
1972–1974	FC Galați	26	(7)
1974–1976	Gloria Buzău (Note: The statistics for the 1974–75 and 1975–76 Divizia B seasons are unavailable.)	15	(1)
1976–1977	Olimpia Râmnicu Sărat		
Total		198	(40)

International career
1967–1968	Romania	4	(0)
- * Club domestic league appearances and goals

Gheorghe Grozea (born 12 January 1945) is a Romanian former football forward.

== International career ==
Gheorghe Grozea played four games at international level for Romania, including a match against Portugal at the 1970 World Cup qualifiers, which ended with a 3–0 loss.

== Honours ==
Dinamo București

- Divizia A: 1964–65

FC Galați

- Divizia B: 1973–74
