= Iosif Varga (footballer) =

Romanian footballer (1941–1992)

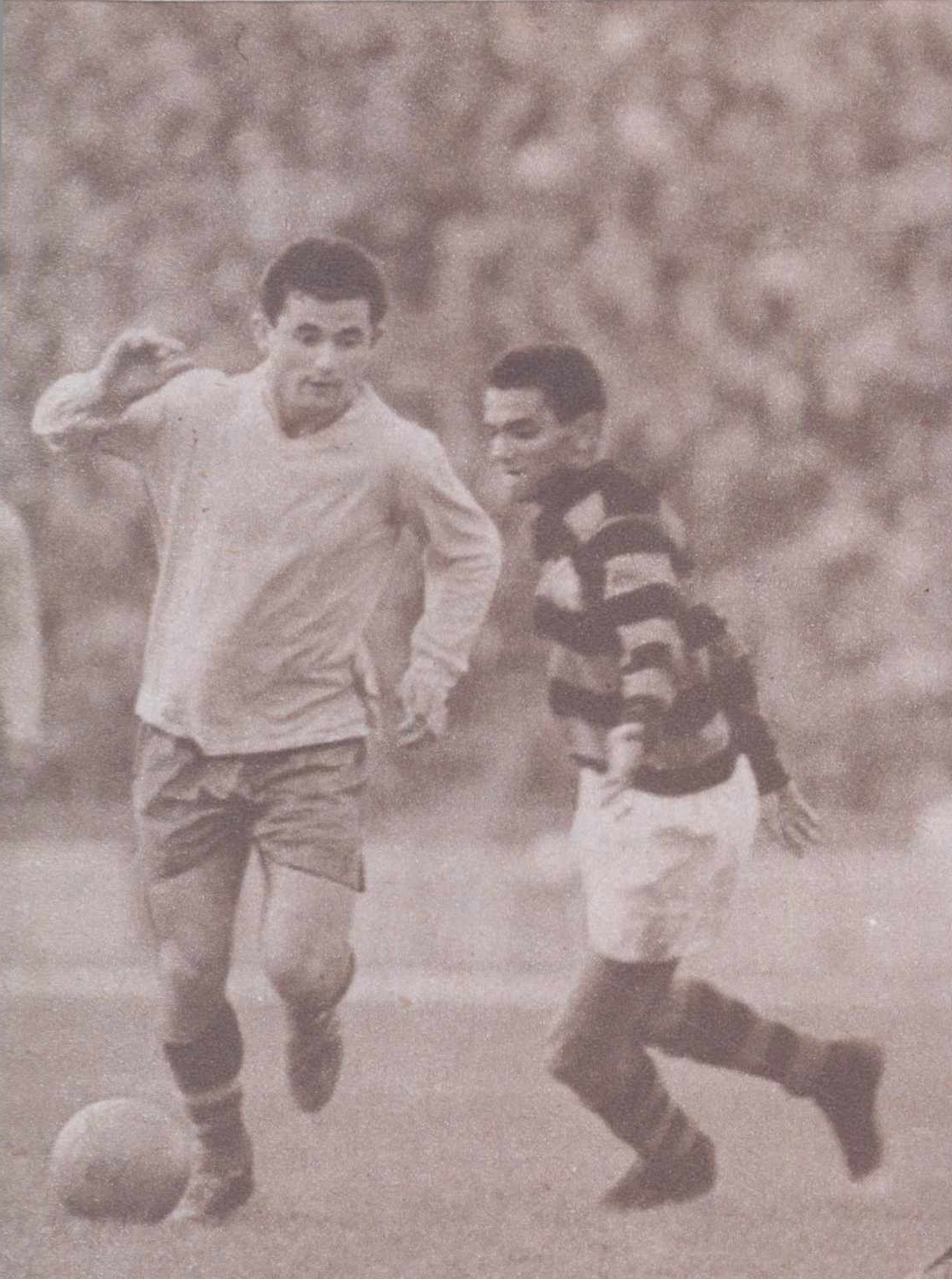
- Varga dribbles past a Flamengo player in 1963.

Personal information
- Date of birth: 4 December 1941
- Place of birth: Bucharest, Romania
- Date of death: 22 May 1992 (aged 50)
- Place of death: Bucharest, Romania
- Height: 1.72 m (5 ft 8 in)
- Positions: Forward; winger

Youth career
- 1951–1958: Dinamo București

Senior career*
Years	Team	Apps	(Gls)
1958–1968	Dinamo București	117	(29)
1965	→ Dinamo Pitești (loan)	3	(0)
1969–1970	Wuppertaler SV	18	(8)
Total		138	(37)

International career
1963	Romania Olympic	1	(0)
1963	Romania	2	(0)
- * Club domestic league appearances and goals

Iosif "Piți" Varga (4 December 1941 – 22 May 1992) was a Romanian professional footballer who played as a forward or winger.

== Club career ==
Varga, nicknamed Piți, was born on 4 December 1941 in the Vitan neighborhood of Bucharest, Romania, growing up in the Pantelimon neighborhood. At the age of 10 he went to play football at the junior squads of Dinamo București where he worked with coach Petre Steinbach. On 24 August 1958, Varga became the youngest player who scored in his Divizia A debut match, when at 16 years, 8 months and 20 days he netted a hat-trick against Steagul Roșu Brașov in a 6–0 victory. At the end of his first season, coach Iuliu Baratky used him the entire match in the 4–0 win over CSM Baia Mare in the 1959 Cupa României final. In 1961, coach Traian Ionescu used him as the team's game coordinator, helping them win the 1961–62 title by scoring four goals in 15 appearances. Among these goals was one from a penalty in a 1–0 derby win over Steaua București, a team against which he previously scored on two other occasions in the earlier seasons.

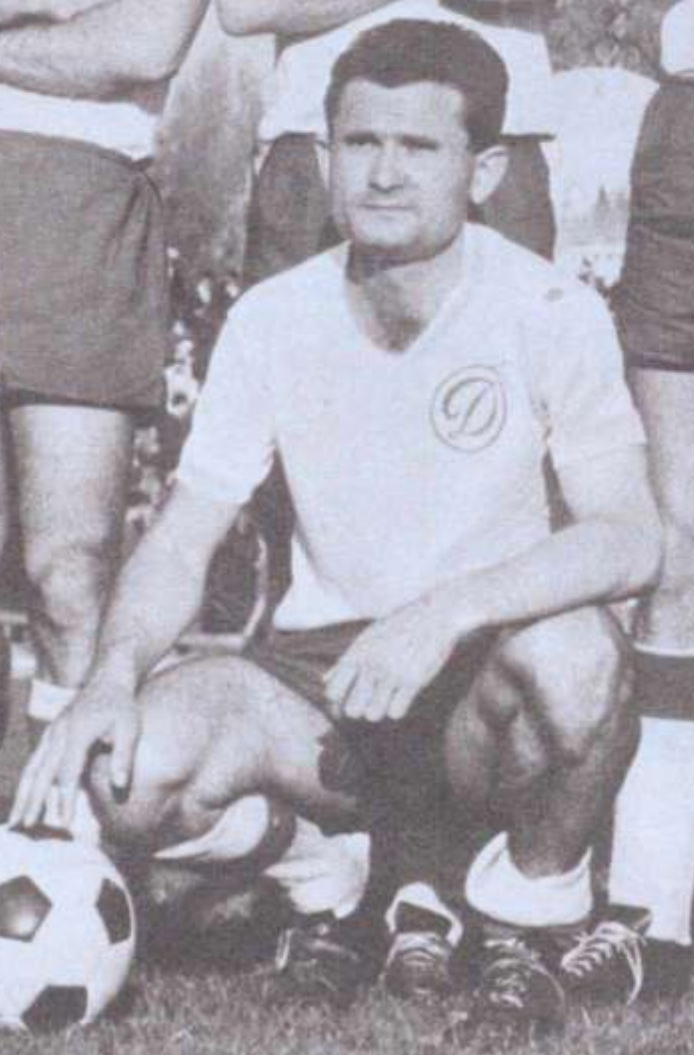
Varga with Dinamo in 1968

In the next three seasons, Varga helped The Red Dogs win another three titles, working with coaches such as Ionescu, Nicolae Dumitru and Angelo Niculescu in the process. In the first one he contributed with four goals scored in 22 matches, in the second he played eight games and in the third he made two appearances. During this time, the club won the 1963–64 Cupa României, but he did not appear in the final. He also made three appearances in the European Cup.

In 1965, Varga was loaned to Dinamo Pitești for half a year during which he played three league games. Subsequently, he returned to Dinamo București, where he would spend another four seasons, winning the 1967–68 Cupa României in which he did not play in the final. He made his last Divizia A appearance on 10 November 1968 in a 3–0 victory against Universitatea Cluj, totaling 120 matches with 29 goals in the competition. Ion Nunweiller, his Dinamo teammate, said this about him: "I consider him the most complete player of his time, not only at Dinamo, but even in Romanian football. He never feared any opponent."

He ended his career by playing one season in West Germany's second tier, Regionalliga West, at Wuppertaler SV, scoring eight goals in 18 appearances.

== International career ==
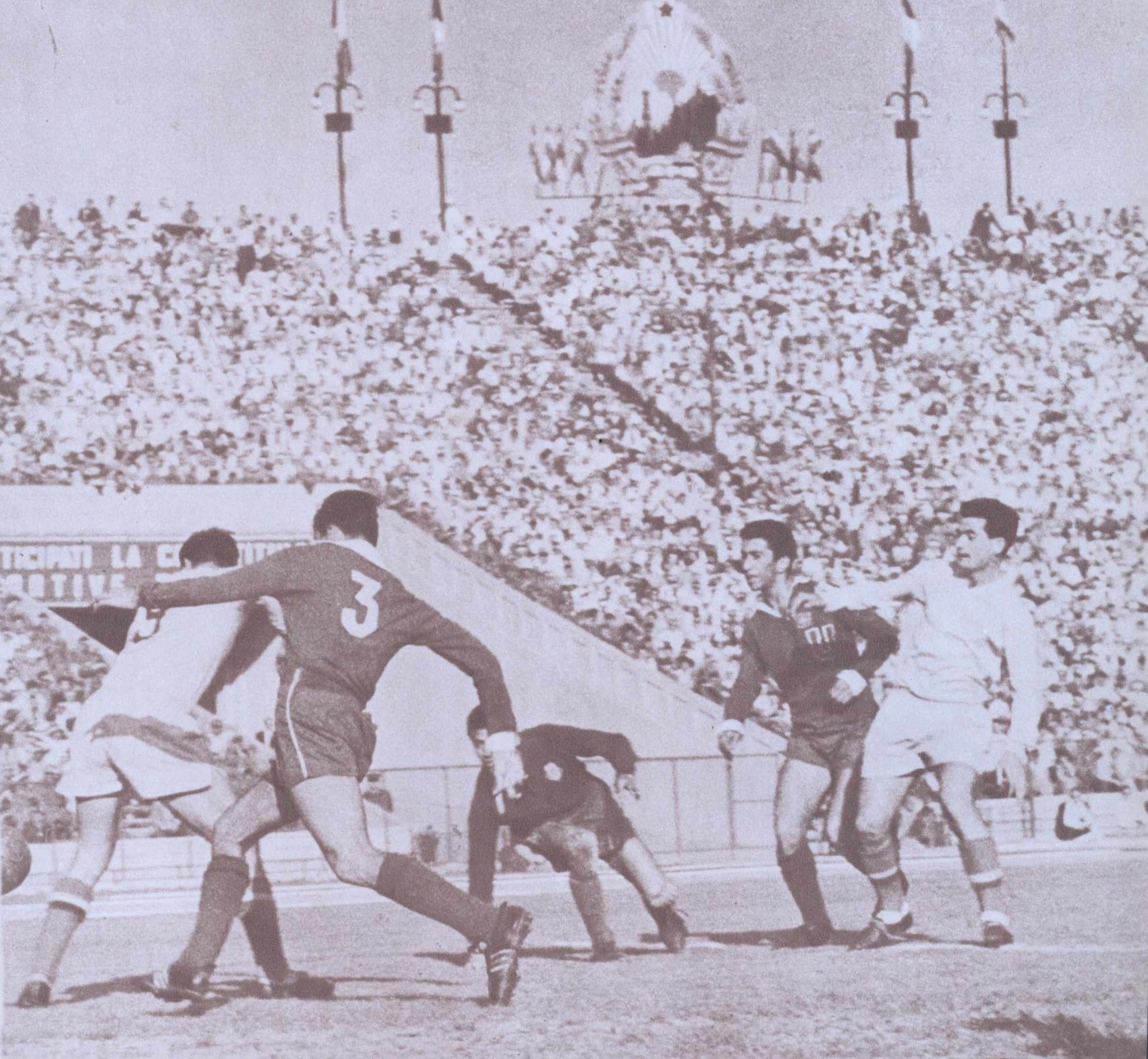
Varga in 1963 (pictured far right) with the Romania Olympic team in a friendly match against Universidad de Chile which Romania won 6–2.

Varga played two friendly matches for Romania, making his debut under coach Silviu Ploeșteanu in a 3–2 victory against East Germany. His second game was a 1–1 draw against Poland. He also played one match for Romania's Olympic team at the 1964 Summer Olympics qualifiers.

== Coaching career ==
After he retired from playing football, Varga worked at Dinamo București's youth center, where he taught generations of players, including Florin Răducioiu, Ioan Lupescu, Bogdan Stelea, Florin Prunea and Florin Tene.

== Death ==
Varga died on 22 May 1992 in his native Bucharest at the age of 50.

== Honours ==
Dinamo București

- Divizia A: 1961–62, 1962–63, 1963–64, 1964–65
- Cupa României: 1958–59, 1963–64, 1967–68
