= Cornel Popa (footballer) =

Romanian footballer

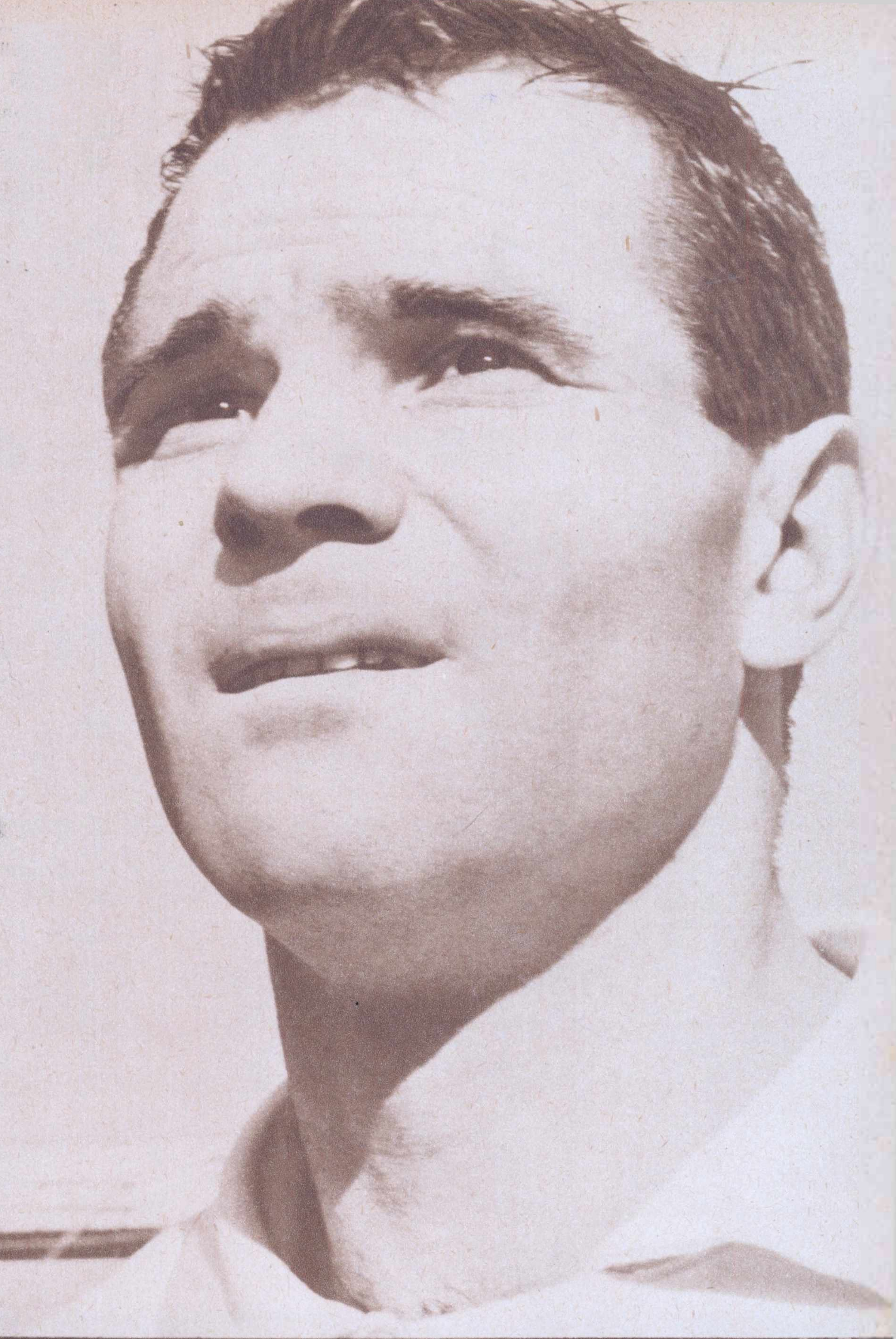

Personal information
- Date of birth: 17 March 1935
- Place of birth: Iași, Romania
- Date of death: 4 November 1999 (aged 64)
- Height: 1.66 m (5 ft 5 in)
- Position: Right back

Youth career
- 1950–1951: Victoria Iași

Senior career*
Years	Team	Apps	(Gls)
1952–1955	Locomotiva Iași		
1955–1956	Dinamo Bacău	16	(0)
1957–1969	Dinamo București (Note: The statistics for the 1957 unofficial championship called Cupa Primăverii are not taken into consideration.)	246	(0)
1969–1970	Beşiktaş	0	(0)
Total		262	(0)

International career
1958–1967	Romania (Note: Including 10 appearances for Romania's Olympic team.)	37	(0)

Managerial career
- 1974–1975: Unirea Alexandria
- Victoria Roman
- Minerul Gura Humorului
- * Club domestic league appearances and goals

Cornel Popa (19 March 1935 – 4 November 1999) was a Romanian football player who played as a right defender.

== Club career ==
Popa was born on 19 March 1935 in Iași, Romania and began playing junior-level football in 1951 at local club Victoria, one year later starting his senior career at Divizia B team Locomotiva Iași. In 1955 he joined Dinamo Bacău where he made his Divizia A debut on 18 March 1956 under coach Florian Ambru in a 1–0 loss to Dinamo București.

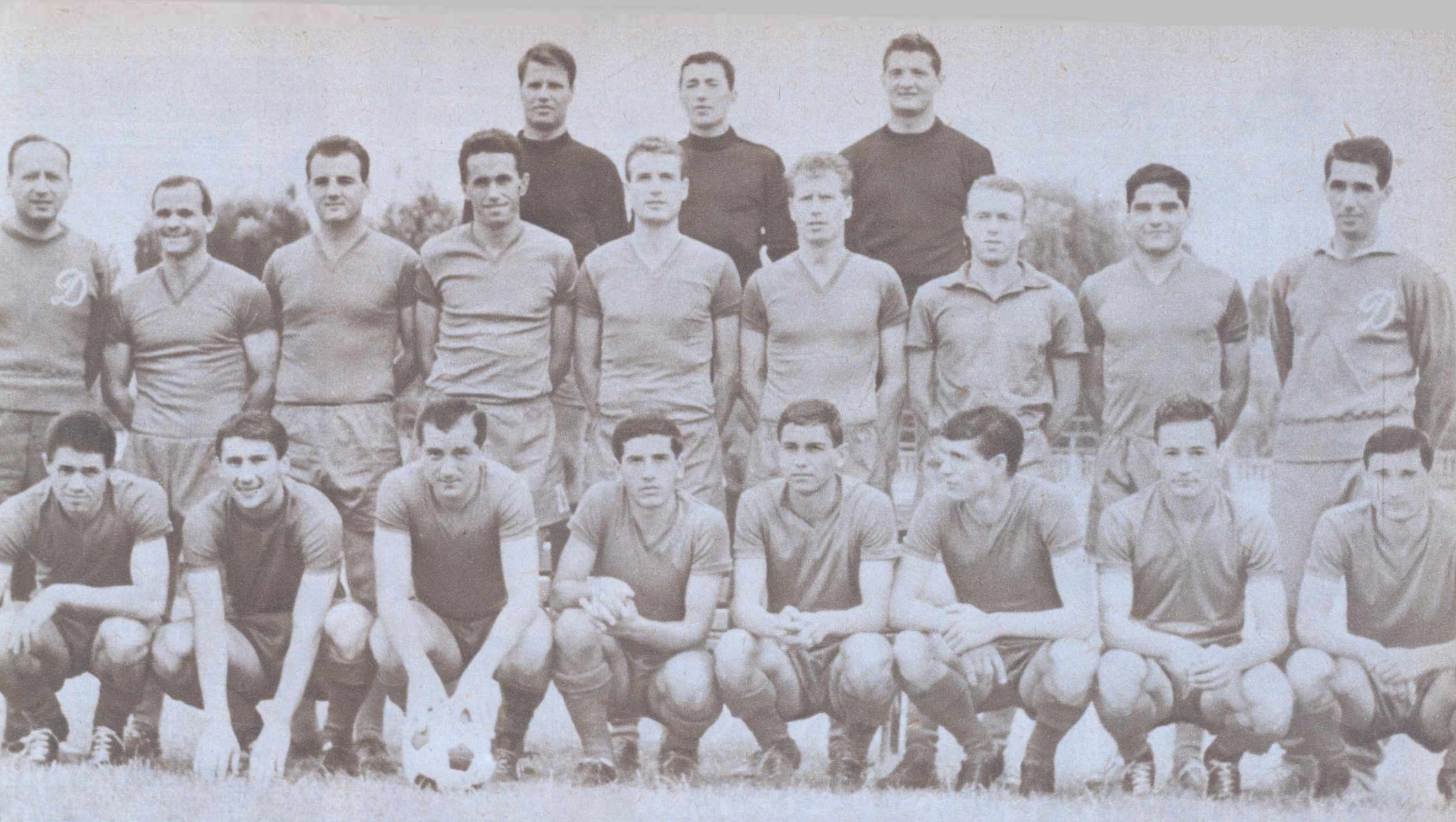
Popa (second row, second from the left) with Dinamo in 1965

In 1957, Popa joined Dinamo București where he first won the 1958–59 Cupa României, playing the entire match under coach Iuliu Baratky in the 4–0 win over CSM Baia Mare in the final. He then won four consecutive Divizia A titles from 1962 until 1965. In the first one he worked with three coaches, Traian Ionescu, Constantin Teașcă and Nicolae Dumitru, who gave him 24 appearances. In the following two Dumitru and Ionescu used him in 25 matches in the first and in 24 games in the second. In the last one he played 25 matches under the guidance of Angelo Niculescu. Popa also won two more Cupa României trophies with The Red Dogs. However, coach Ionescu did not use him in the 5–3 victory over rivals Steaua București in the 1964 final, but in the 1968 final he played the entire match which was a 3–1 win against Rapid București, being coached by Bazil Marian. He played 15 games in the European Cup and two in the UEFA Cup Winners' Cup. In the 1963–64 European Cup campaign, he helped Dinamo get past East Germany champion, Motor Jena, being eliminated in the next phase by Real Madrid. He also appeared in a historical 2–1 win over Inter Milan in the 1965–66 edition who were the winners of the last two seasons of the competition. Popa made his last Divizia A appearance on 15 June 1969, playing in Dinamo's 1–0 away loss to Universitatea Craiova, totaling 262 appearances in the competition.

He ended his career after a period spent in Turkey at Beşiktaş where he did not play any games because of an injury.

== International career ==
Popa played 27 games for Romania, captaining the team in 12 of them, making his debut on 26 October 1958 under coach Augustin Botescu in a 2–1 friendly away loss to Hungary. He made four appearances in the 1960 European Nations' Cup qualifiers, helping the team eliminate Turkey with 3–2 on aggregate, managing to qualify to the quarter-finals where they were eliminated by Czechoslovakia who advanced to the final tournament. He also played in a 3–1 victory against Spain during the 1964 European Nations' Cup qualifiers and made six appearances in the 1966 World Cup qualifiers. Popa played five matches in the Euro 1968 qualifiers, including his last appearance which took place on 24 May 1967 in a 7–1 away loss to Switzerland.

== Managerial career ==
Popa started coaching after 1970, working for a while at Dinamo's center for juniors and children. Subsequently, he coached several teams in the Romanian lower leagues such as Unirea Alexandria, Victoria Roman, and Minerul Gura Humorului without achieving any notable performances.

== Death ==
He died on 4 November 1999 at the age of 64 due to cancer.

== Honours ==
Dinamo București

- Divizia A: 1961–62, 1962–63, 1963–64, 1964–65
- Cupa României: 1958–59, 1963–64, 1967–68
