= Lică Nunweiller =

Romanian footballer (1938–2013)

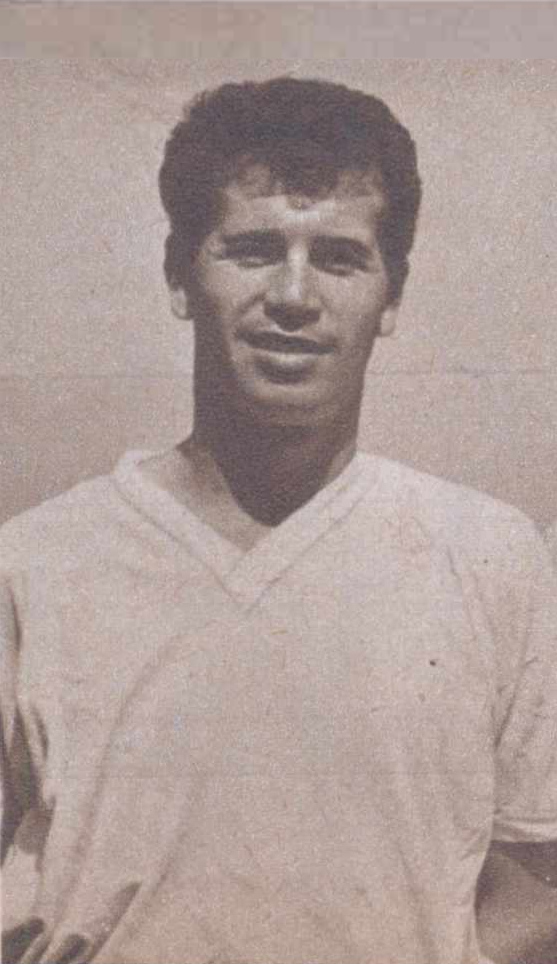
- Nunweiller pictured in 1963

Personal information
- Date of birth: 12 December 1938
- Place of birth: Piatra Neamț, Romania
- Date of death: 8 November 2013 (aged 74)
- Place of death: Bucharest, Romania
- Height: 1.72 m (5 ft 8 in)
- Positions: Midfielder; defender

Youth career
- 1947–1948: Unirea Tricolor București
- 1948–1949: Venus U.C.B.
- 1949–1957: Dinamo București

Senior career*
Years	Team	Apps	(Gls)
1957–1959	Dinamo Obor București		
1960–1967	Dinamo București	140	(5)
1967–1969	Dinamo Bacău	55	(0)
1969	Beşiktaş	1	(0)
1970	Dinamo București	11	(0)
Total		207	(5)

International career
1961–1968	Romania (Note: Including one appearance for Romania's Olympic team.)	5	(0)

Managerial career
- 1976–1977: Dinamo București (assistant)
- * Club domestic league appearances and goals

Lică Nunweiller (12 December 1938 – 8 November 2013) was a Romanian footballer who played as a midfielder for clubs in Romania and Turkey. He made five appearances for the Romania national team.

== Club career ==
=== Early career ===
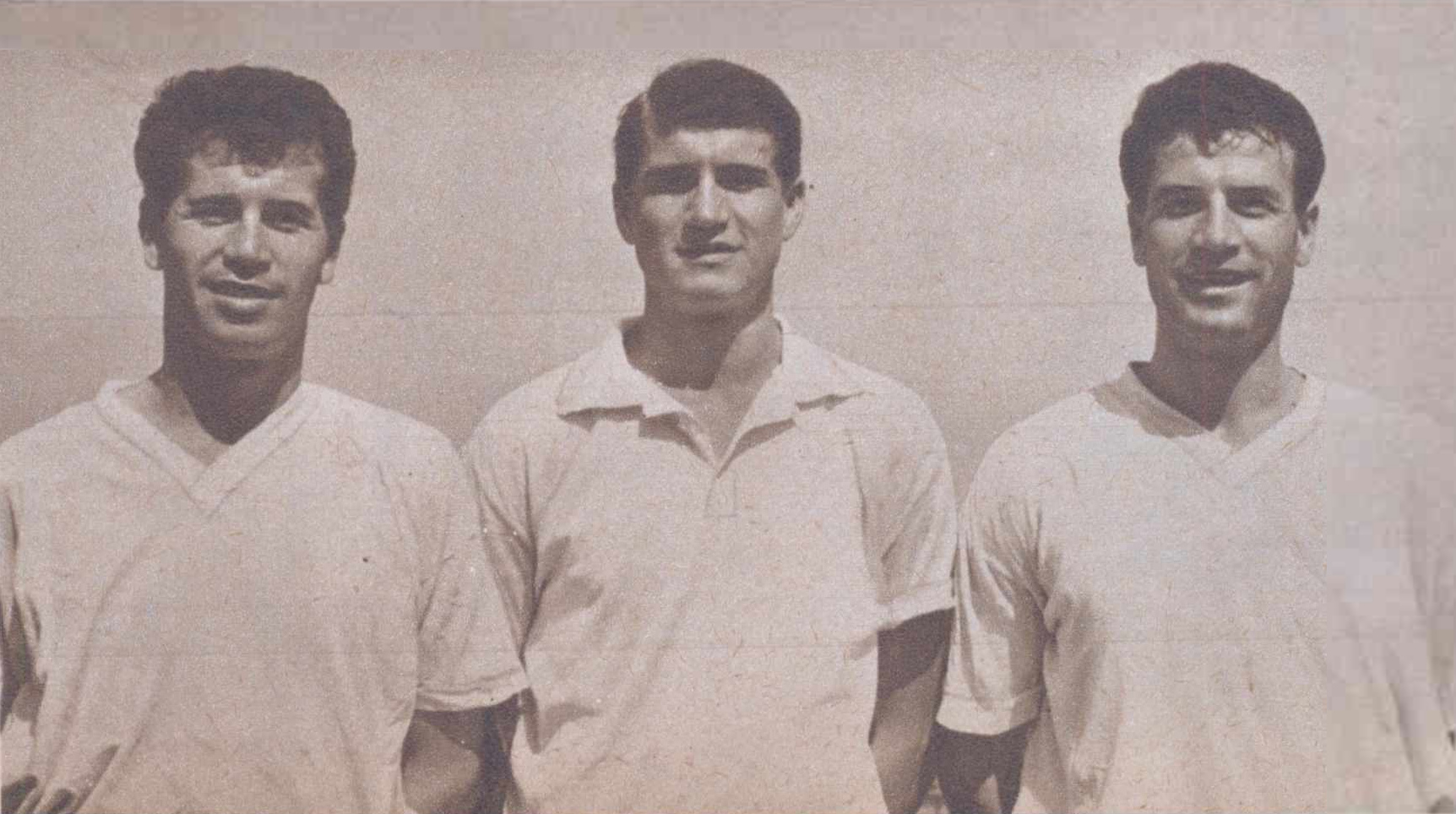
The Nunweiller brothers (left to right): Lică, Radu and Ion

Nunweiller was born on 13 November 1938 in Piatra Neamț, Romania, but his parents told the authorities that he was born on 12 November 1938, because they felt that the number 13 brings bad luck. He had an Austrian father named Johann Nunweiller, who settled in Piatra Neamț after World War I where he met his wife, Rozina, and later they moved to Bucharest. He had six brothers: Constantin, the oldest, was a water polo player, while Dumitru, Ion, Victor, Radu, and Eduard were all footballers who each played at least one spell at Dinamo București. They are the reason why the club's nickname is "The Red Dogs" as especially he and Ion were known for their aggressiveness on the field, which often caused their faces to turn red from the effort. He began playing junior-level football in 1947 at Unirea Tricolor București, moving afterwards to Venus U.C.B., before joining Dinamo București where he worked with coach Petre Steinbach. In 1957 he started to play senior level football at Dinamo Obor București in Divizia B.

=== Dinamo București ===
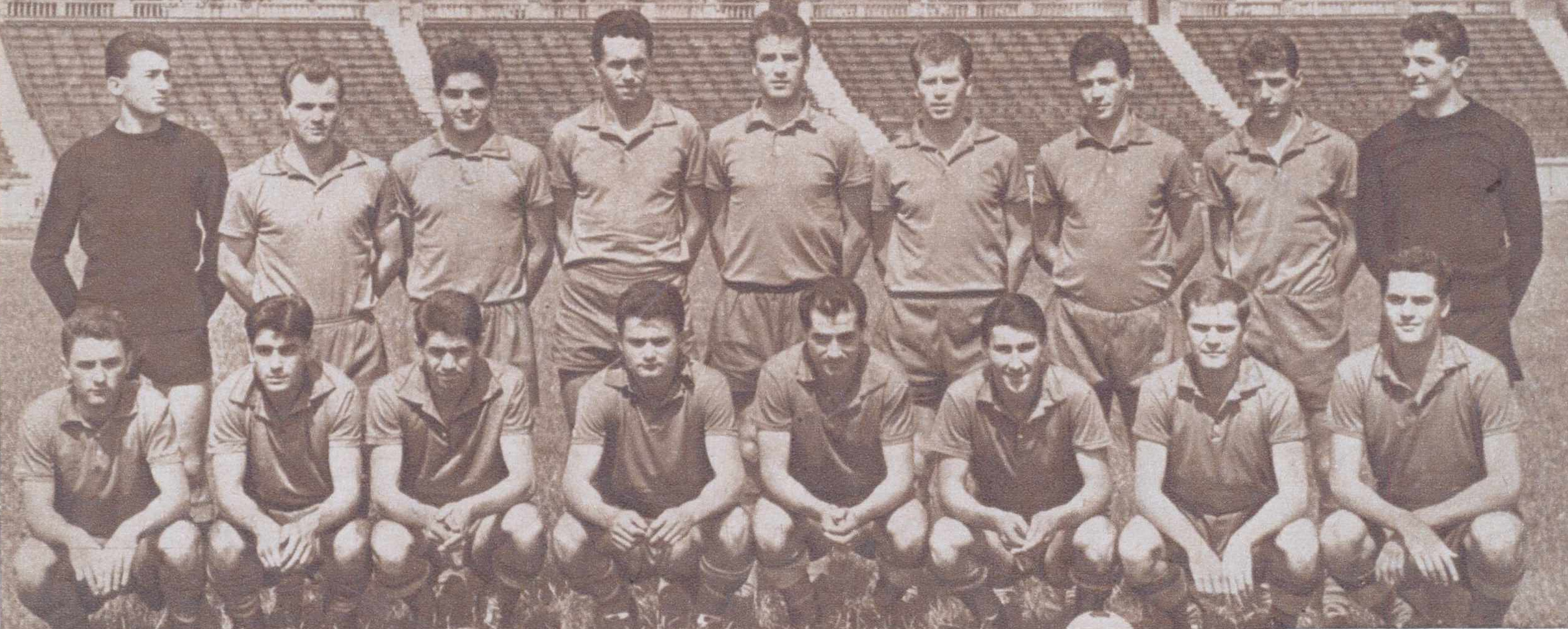
Nunweiller (back row, fourth from right) with Dinamo București in 1963

Nunweiller made his Divizia A debut, playing for Dinamo București on 5 June 1960 under coach Traian Ionescu in a 2–0 victory against Rapid București. Nunweiller helped the club win four consecutive Divizia A titles from 1962 until 1965. In the first one he worked with three coaches, Ionescu, Constantin Teașcă, and Nicolae Dumitru, who gave him 18 appearances. In the subsequent two seasons, Dumitru and Ionescu utilized him in 22 matches, where he scored one goal in the first, and in 26 matches, where he also scored one goal in the second. In the last one he played 13 games, netting twice under the guidance of Angelo Niculescu. At the conquest of all these titles he was teammates with his brother Ion, and his brother Radu was also on the team for the last two. Nunweiller also won the 1963–64 Cupa României with The Red Dogs, coach Ionescu using him and his brothers Lică and Radu for the full 90 minutes in the 5–3 victory over rivals Steaua București in the final. He played for Dinamo in a total of 11 matches without scoring in the European Cup, including all four games of the 1963–64 European Cup campaign as they got past East Germany champion, Motor Jena, being eliminated in the next phase by Real Madrid. He also appeared in a historical 2–1 win over Inter Milan in the 1965–66 edition who were the winners of the previous two seasons of the competition.

=== Late career ===
In 1967, he joined Dinamo Bacău for two seasons. Nunweiller next moved to Turkey in 1969 to join Beşiktaş, making him one of the first Romanians to play professional football there. He made only one appearance in the Turkish league during the 1969–70 season, as coach Krum Milev used him the entire match on 25 October 1969 in the 1–0 victory against Ankara Demirspor. Afterwards, Nunweiller returned to Romania to end his career at Dinamo București. On 19 July 1970, he made his last Divizia A appearance in a 1–1 draw against Politehnica Iași, totaling 206 matches with five goals in the competition.

== International career ==
Nunweiller played four friendly games for Romania, making his debut on 8 October 1961 under coach Gheorghe Popescu in a 4–0 victory against Turkey. His following games were a 3–2 win over East Germany, a goalless draw against Turkey and a 1–1 tie against Austria.

== Coaching career ==
Nunweiller was the assistant coach of his brother Ion at Dinamo București during the 1976–77 season at the end of which they won the title together.

== Death ==
Nunweiller died on 8 November 2013 at the Floreasca Hospital in Bucharest at age 74. During Dinamo's first home game after his death, the fans displayed a banner dedicated to him that said:"Few of those who wrote the history of our team remain! You taught us what the "D" of life is, Lică Nunweiller, thank you!".

== Honours ==
=== Player ===
Dinamo București

- Divizia A: 1961–62, 1962–63, 1963–64, 1964–65
- Cupa României: 1963–64

=== Assistant coach ===
Dinamo București

- Divizia A: 1976–77
