= 1967–68 Cupa României =

Tournament details
- Country: Romania

Final positions
- Champions: Dinamo București
- Runners-up: Rapid București

The 1967–68 Cupa României was the 30th edition of Romania's most prestigious football cup competition.

The title was won by Dinamo București against Rapid București.

== Format ==
The competition is an annual knockout tournament.

In the first round proper, two pots were made, first pot with Divizia A teams and other teams till 16 and the second pot with the rest of teams qualified in this phase. Each tie is played as a single leg.

First round proper matches are played on the ground of the lowest ranked team, then from the second round proper the matches are played on a neutral location.

In the first round proper, if a match is drawn after 90 minutes, the game goes in extra time, and if the scored is still tight after 120 minutes, the team who played away will qualify.

From the second round proper, if a match is drawn after 90 minutes, the game goes in extra time, and if the scored is still tight after 120 minutes, then the team from the lower division will qualify. If the teams are from the same division a replay will be played.

From the first edition, the teams from Divizia A entered in competition in sixteen finals, rule which remained till today.

== First round proper ==
Team 1	Score	Team 2
3 March 1968
Vagonul Arad (Div. B)	2–0	(Div. A) Steagul Roşu Braşov
Minerul Baia Mare (Div. B)	1–3	(Div. A) Universitatea Craiova
Progresul Brăila (Div. C)	1–4	(Div. A) Dinamo Bacău
Electronica Obor București (Div. B)	0–2	(Div. A) Rapid București
Metalul București (Div. B)	0–1	(Div. A) Dinamo București
TUG București (Div. C)	0–3	(Div. A) ASA 1962 Târgu Mureș
Chimia Făgăraş (Div. C)	1–2	(Div. A) Steaua București
Ancora Galaţi (Div. C)	2–2 (a.e.t.)	(Div. B) CFR Timişoara
Politehnica Iași (Div. B)	3–0	(Div. A) UTA Arad
Marina Mangalia (Div. D)	2–3	(Div. B) Politehnica Timişoara
Lemnarul Odorhei (Div. D)	0–3 (forfait)	(Div. A) Jiul Petroşani ‡
ASA Crişul Oradea (Div. B)	0–1 (a.e.t.)	(Div. A) Petrolul Ploiești
CSM Sibiu (Div. B)	0–1 (a.e.t.)	(Div. A) Argeș Pitești
Chimia Suceava (Div. B)	2–1	(Div. A) Farul Constanța
Metalul Târgovişte (Div. C)	1–1 (a.e.t.)	(Div. A) Progresul București
Victoria Târgu Jiu (Div. D)	1–2 (a.e.t.)	(Div. A) Universitatea Cluj

Notes:

- ‡ The match was interrupted in the 60' minutes at 1–2 for Jiul Petroşani and homologated with 0–3.

== Second round proper ==
Team 1	Score	Team 2
3 April 1968
Dinamo București	1–0	Chimia Suceava
Dinamo Bacău	2–1	Petrolul Ploiești
Vagonul Arad	1–1 (a.e.t.)	Jiul Petroşani
Steaua București	2–1	Politehnica Timişoara
Rapid București	3–0	Universitatea Craiova
Politehnica Iași	5–1	Argeș Pitești
Universitatea Cluj	1–1 (a.e.t.)	Progresul București
CFR Timişoara	1–1 (a.e.t.)	ASA 1962 Târgu Mureș
10 April 1968 — Replay
Progresul București	2–1	Universitatea Cluj

== Quarter-finals ==
Team 1	Score	Team 2
17 April 1968
Rapid București	2–0	Politehnica Iași
Progresul București	2–1	Steaua București
Vagonul Arad	1–1 (a.e.t.)	Dinamo Bacău
Dinamo București	2–1 (a.e.t.)	CFR Timişoara

== Semi-finals ==
Team 1	Score	Team 2
12 June 1968
Dinamo București	4–3 (a.e.t.)	Progresul București
Rapid București	2–0	Vagonul Arad

== Final ==
16 June 1968
17:30 EET

Dinamo București	3–1 (a.e.t.)	Rapid București
Dumitrache 78'; Lucescu 115', 116'	Report	Năsturescu 70'

23 August, Bucharest
Attendance: 30,000
Referee: Vasile Dumitrescu (Bucharest)

Cupa României 1967–68 winners

3rd title
