= 1985–86 FC Steaua București season =

Steaua București
1985–86 season
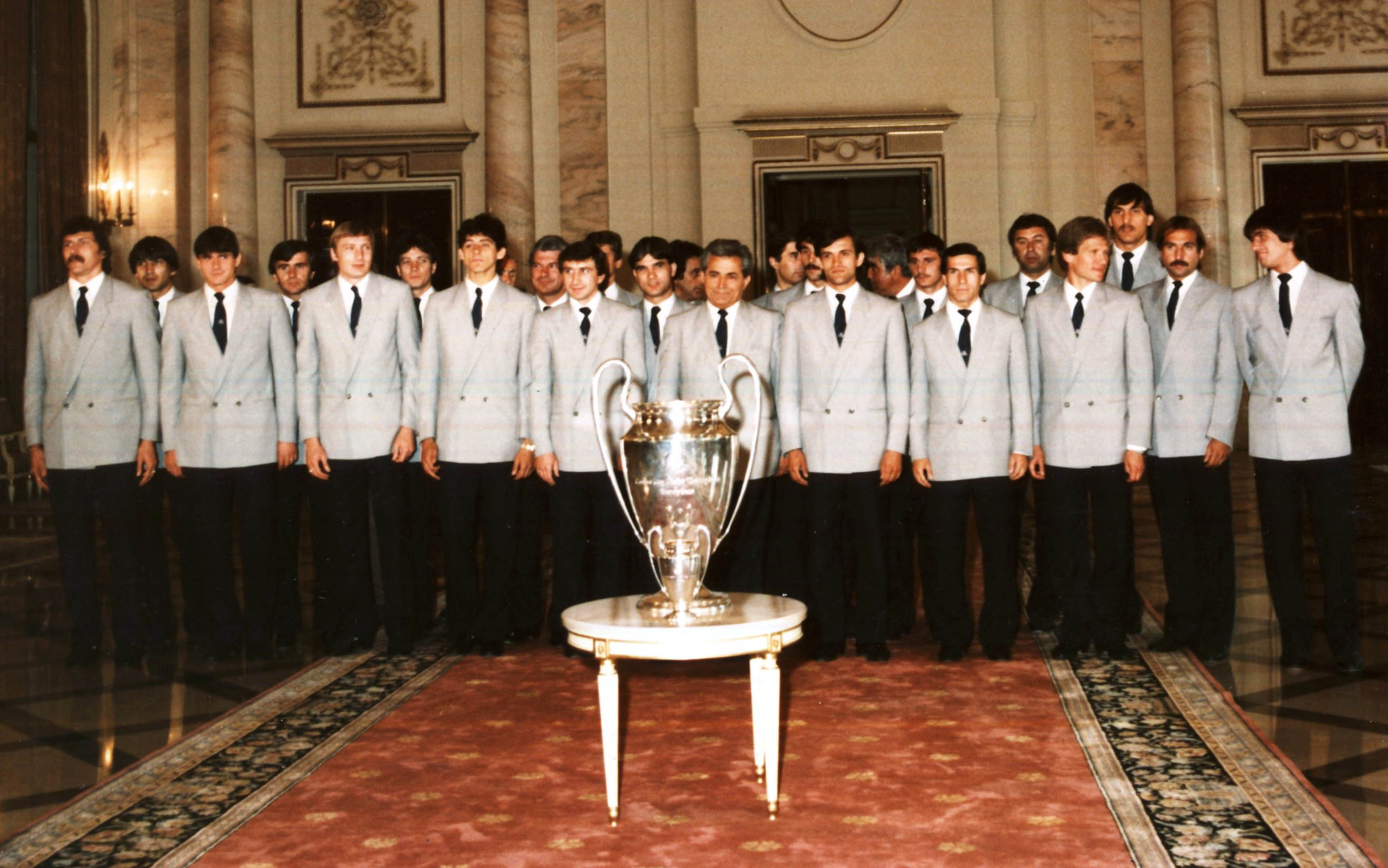
- Steaua București players pose with the European Cup in 1986
- Manager: Emerich Jenei
- Stadium: Stadionul Steaua
- Divizia A: Winners
- Cupa României: Runners-up
- European Cup: Winners
- Top goalscorer: League: Victor Pițurcă (29); All: Victor Pițurcă (34)
- Highest home attendance: 30,000
- Average home league attendance: 20,882
Home colours	Away colours

The 1985–86 season was Steaua București's 38th competitive season, 38th year in existence as a football club and their second season under head coach Emerich Jenei in his third spell in charge. The club enjoyed one of the most successful campaigns in its history, winning the Divizia A title for the 11th time and the European Cup for the first time, becoming the first Romanian club to win the competition.

== Season summary ==
Steaua București won the Divizia A title for the second consecutive season, securing their 11th Romanian league championship. The club also reached the final of the Cupa României, finishing as runners-up after losing 1–0 to Dinamo București, but achieved their greatest European success by defeating Barcelona on penalties to win the European Cup for the first time in their history, becoming the first Romanian club to lift the trophy.

== Squad ==
Squad during the season

Note: Flags indicate national team as defined under FIFA eligibility rules; some limited exceptions apply. Players may hold more than one non-FIFA nationality.

No.	Pos.	Nation	Player
—	GK	ROU	Helmut Duckadam
—	GK	ROU	Dumitru Stângaciu
—	GK	ROU	Constantin Blid
—	DF	ROU	Ilie Bărbulescu
—	DF	ROU	Miodrag Belodedici
—	DF	ROU	Adrian Bumbescu
—	DF	ROU	Ștefan Iovan
—	DF	ROU	Dan Petrescu
—	DF	ROU	Anton Weissenbacher
—	MF	ROU	Lucian Bălan
—	MF	ROU	László Bölöni

No.	Pos.	Nation	Player
—	MF	ROU	Mihail Majearu
—	MF	ROU	Constantin Pistol
—	MF	ROU	Tudorel Stoica
—	MF	ROU	Nita Cireasa
—	MF	ROU	Iosif Rotariu
—	FW	ROU	Gabi Balint
—	FW	ROU	Anghel Iordănescu
—	FW	ROU	Marius Lăcătuș
—	FW	ROU	Victor Pițurcă
—	FW	ROU	Marin Radu
—	FW	ROU	Gheorghe Ceaușilă

== Transfers ==
=== In ===
Position	Player	From	Type	Fee	Date	Ref.
MF	(Romania) Lucian Bălan	(Romania) FC Maramureș	Transfer	Free	1 July 1985	
DF	(Romania) Anton Weissenbacher	(Romania) Minaur	Transfer	Free	1 July 1985	
MF	(Romania) Iosif Rotariu	(Romania) Politehnica Timișoara	Transfer	Undisclosed	1 July 1985	
FW	(Romania) Anghel Iordănescu	(Greece) OFI Crete	Transfer	Undisclosed	1 July 1985	
FW	(Romania) Gheorghe Ceaușilă	(Romania) Chimia Râmnicu Vâlcea	Transfer	Undisclosed	1 July 1985	

=== Out ===
Position	Player	To	Type	Fee	Date	Ref.
MF	(Romania) Marcel Pușcaș	(Romania) Rapid București	Transfer	Free	1 July 1985	
FW	(Romania) Ștefan Petcu	(Romania) Bihor Oradea	Transfer	Undisclosed	1 July 1985	
DF	(Romania) Nicolae Laurențiu	(Romania) Olt Scornicești	Transfer	Undisclosed	1 July 1985	
DF	(Romania) Augustin Eduard	(Romania) Argeș Pitești	Transfer	Undisclosed	1 July 1985	
FW	(Romania) Gheorghe Ceaușilă	(Romania) Chimia Râmnicu Vâlcea	Transfer	Undisclosed	1 January 1986	

== Competitions ==
Competition	First match	Last match	Starting round	Final position	Record							
Competition	First match	Last match	Starting round	Final position	Pld	W	D	L	GF	GA	GD	Win %
Divizia A	4 August 1985	18 June 1986	Matchday 1	Winners	34	26	5	3	79	25	+54	76.47
Cupa României	4 December 1985	25 June 1986	First round	Runners-up	5	4	0	1	19	6	+13	80.00
European Cup	18 September 1985	7 May 1986	First round	Winners	9	4	3	2	13	5	+8	44.44
Total					48	34	8	6	111	36	+75	70.83

Source: Competitions

=== Divizia A ===
Pos	Team	Pld	W	D	L	GF	GA	GD	Pts	Qualification or relegation
1	Steaua București (C)	34	26	5	3	79	25	+54	57	Qualification to European Cup first round
2	Sportul Studenţesc București	34	19	10	5	87	41	+46	48	Qualification to UEFA Cup first round
3	Universitatea Craiova	34	20	6	8	65	36	+29	46	Qualification to UEFA Cup first round
4	Dinamo București	34	20	6	8	49	27	+22	46	Qualification to Cup Winners' Cup first round
5	Corvinul Hunedoara	34	17	3	14	84	50	+34	37	

Source: LT
Rules for classification: 1) points; 2) goal difference; 3) number of goals scored
(C) Champions

==== Results summary ====
Overall								Home						Away					
Pld	W	D	L	GF	GA	GD	Pts	W	D	L	GF	GA	GD	W	D	L	GF	GA	GD
34	26	5	3	79	25	+54	83	16	1	0	50	8	+42	10	4	3	29	17	+12

Source: Divizia A

(Note: During the 1985–86 season, the Romanian league used the traditional points system, awarding two points for a win and one point for a draw.)

==== Results by round ====
Round	1	2	3	4	5	6	7	8	9	10	11	12	13	14	15	16	17	18	19	20	21	22	23	24	25	26	27	28	29	30	31	32	33	34
Ground	H	A	A	H	A	H	A	A	H	H	A	H	H	A	H	A	H	A	H	H	A	H	H	A	A	H	H	A	A	A	H	A	H	A
Result	W	W	W	W	W	W	W	W	D	W	D	W	W	D	W	W	W	L	W	W	W	W	W	W	W	W	W	W	D	L	W	D	W	L
Position	7	2	2	1	1	1	1	1	1	1	1	1	1	1	1	1	1	1	1	1	1	1	1	1	1	1	1	1	1	1	1	1	1	1

Source: Divizia A
A = Away; H = Home; W = Win; D = Draw; L = Loss

==== Matches ====
Fixtures listed by date played; matchday numbers shown are the official league rounds.

4 August 1985 1	Steaua București	1–0	Corvinul Hunedoara	Bucharest
EEST (UTC+3)				Stadium: Stadionul Steaua

11 August 1985 2	Argeș Pitești	0–2	Steaua București	Pitești
EEST (UTC+3)				Stadium: Stadionul 1 Mai (Pitești)

14 August 1985 3	Olt Scornicești	0–1	Steaua București	Scornicești
EEST (UTC+3)				Stadium: Stadionul Viitorul

18 August 1985 4	Steaua București	1–0	Dinamo București	Bucharest
EEST (UTC+3)				Stadium: Stadionul Steaua

1 September 1985 5	ASA Târgu Mureș	1–2	Steaua București	Târgu Mureș
EEST (UTC+3)				Stadium: Stadionul Municipal (Târgu Mureș)

15 September 1985 6	Steaua București	6–1	Petrolul Ploiești	Bucharest
EEST (UTC+3)				Stadium: Stadionul Steaua

22 September 1985 7	Rapid București	1–2	Steaua București	Bucharest
EEST (UTC+3)				Stadium: Stadionul Giulești

29 September 1985 8	Gloria Buzău	0–1	Steaua București	Buzău
EET (UTC+2)				Stadium: Gloria Stadium

6 October 1985 9	Steaua București	1–1	Sportul Studenţesc București	Bucharest
EET (UTC+2)				Stadium: Stadionul Steaua

19 October 1985 10	Steaua București	1–0	Chimia Râmnicu Vâlcea	Bucharest
EET (UTC+2)				Stadium: Stadionul Steaua

27 October 1985 11	Victoria București	0–0	Steaua București	Bucharest
EET (UTC+2)				Stadium: Stadionul Metaloglobus

31 October 1985 12	Steaua București	4–2	Politehnica Timișoara	Bucharest
EET (UTC+2)				Stadium: Stadionul Steaua

17 November 1985 13	Steaua București	2–0	Universitatea Cluj	Bucharest
EET (UTC+2)				Stadium: Stadionul Steaua

20 November 1985 14	Bihor Oradea	0–0	Steaua București	Oradea
EET (UTC+2)				Stadium: Stadionul Municipal (Oradea)

24 November 1985 15	Steaua București	6–0	Brașov	Bucharest
EET (UTC+2)				Stadium: Stadionul Steaua

1 December 1985 16	FCM Bacău	0–2	Steaua București	Bacău
EET (UTC+2)				Stadium: Stadionul Municipal (Bacău)

8 December 1985 17	Steaua București	2–0	Universitatea Craiova	Bucharest
EET (UTC+2)				Stadium: Stadionul Steaua

9 March 1986 18	Corvinul Hunedoara	1–3	Steaua București	Hunedoara
EET (UTC+2)				Stadium: Stadionul Corvinul

13 March 1986 19	Steaua București	1–0	Argeș Pitești	Bucharest
EET (UTC+2)				Stadium: Stadionul Steaua

23 March 1986 20	Steaua București	3–0	Olt Scornicești	Bucharest
EET (UTC+2)				Stadium: Stadionul Steaua

27 March 1986 23	Petrolul Ploiești	0–2	Steaua București	Ploiești
EET (UTC+2)				Stadium: Stadionul Petrolul

2 April 1986 22	Steaua București	4–1	ASA Târgu Mureș	Bucharest
EEST (UTC+3)				Stadium: Stadionul Steaua

12 April 1986 24	Steaua București	3–1	Rapid București	Bucharest
EEST (UTC+3)				Stadium: Stadionul Steaua

27 April 1986 26	Sportul Studenţesc București	1–2	Steaua București	Bucharest
EEST (UTC+3)				Stadium: Stadionul Sportul

30 April 1986 27	Chimia Râmnicu Vâlcea	0–4	Steaua București	Râmnicu Vâlcea
EEST (UTC+3)				Stadium: Stadionul 1 Mai (Râmnicu Vâlcea)

11 May 1986 25	Steaua București	4–1	Gloria Buzău	Bucharest
EEST (UTC+3)				Stadium: Stadionul Steaua

18 May 1986 28	Steaua București	4–0	Victoria București	Bucharest
EEST (UTC+3)				Stadium: Stadionul Steaua

21 May 1986 29	Politehnica Timișoara	0–1	Steaua București	Timișoara
EEST (UTC+3)				Stadium: Stadionul 1 Mai (Timișoara)

25 May 1986 30	Universitatea Cluj	2–2	Steaua București	Cluj-Napoca
EEST (UTC+3)				Stadium: Stadionul Municipal (Cluj-Napoca)

28 May 1986 21	Dinamo București	2–1	Steaua București	Bucharest
EEST (UTC+3)				Stadium: Stadionul Dinamo

31 May 1986 31	Steaua București	5–0	Bihor Oradea	Bucharest
EEST (UTC+3)				Stadium: Stadionul Steaua

8 June 1986 32	Brașov	2–2	Steaua București	Brașov
EEST (UTC+3)				Stadium: Stadionul Tineretului

14 June 1986 33	Steaua București	2–1	FCM Bacău	Bucharest
EEST (UTC+3)				Stadium: Stadionul Steaua

18 June 1986 34	Universitatea Craiova	5–4	Steaua București	Craiova
EEST (UTC+3)				Stadium: Stadionul Central

=== Cupa României ===
4 December 1985 First round	Minerul Băiuţ	1–8	Steaua București	Băiuț
EET (UTC+2)				Stadium: Stadionul Minerul (Băiuț)

26 February 1986 Second round	Steaua București	4–2	Rapid București	Bucharest
EET (UTC+2)				Stadium: Stadionul Steaua

15 May 1986 Quarter-finals	Steaua București	5–1	Progresul Vulcan București	Bucharest
EEST (UTC+3)				Stadium: Stadionul Steaua

21 June 1986 Semi-finals	Jiul Petroşani	1–2	Steaua București	Petroșani
EEST (UTC+3)				Stadium: Stadionul Jiul

25 June 1986 Final	Dinamo București	1–0	Steaua București	Bucharest
EEST (UTC+3)	Damaschin 71'			Stadium: Stadionul 23 August

=== European Cup ===
==== First round ====
18 September 1985 First leg	Vejle (Denmark)	1–1	(Romania) Steaua București	Vejle
EEST (UTC+3)	Barnett 61'	Report	Bumbescu (yellow card) 16'; Radun 87'	Stadium: Vejle Stadium; Attendance: 4,500; Referee: Werner Föckler (West Germany)

2 October 1985 Second leg	Steaua București (Romania)	4–1 (5–2 agg.)	(Denmark) Vejle	Bucharest
EET (UTC+2)	Pițurcă 8'; Bölöni 34' (yellow card) 35'; Balint 51'; Stoica 74'	Report	Hansen (yellow card) 8'; Simonsen 37'; Laursen (yellow card) 46'	Stadium: Stadionul Steaua; Attendance: 20,000; Referee: Rosario Lo Bello (Italy)

==== Second round ====
23 October 1985 First leg	Budapest Honvéd (Hungary)	1–0	(Romania) Steaua București	Budapest
EET (UTC+2)	Détári 33'	Report	Lăcătuș (yellow card) 7'	Stadium: Fáy utcai Attendance: 4,000; Referee: Ron Bridges (Wales)

6 November 1985 Second leg	Steaua București (Romania)	4–1 (4–2 agg.)	(Hungary) Budapest Honvéd	Bucharest
EET (UTC+2)	Pițurcă 1'; Lăcătuș (yellow card) 25' (goal) 35'; Stoica (yellow card) 31'; Bărbulescu 46'; Majearu 52' (pen.)	Report	Sallai (yellow card) 13'; Kovács (yellow card) 28'; Détári 64' (pen.); Cseh (yellow card) 68'	Stadium: Stadionul Steaua; Attendance: 21,000; Referee: Horst Brummeier (Austria)

==== Quarter-finals ====
5 March 1986 First leg	Steaua București (Romania)	0–0	(Finland) Kuusysi	Bucharest
15:00 EET (UTC+2)	Majearu (yellow card) 69'	Report	Jäntti (yellow card) 5'; Carroll (yellow card) 74'	Stadium: Stadionul Steaua; Attendance: 25,000; Referee: Franz Gächter (Switzerland)

19 March 1986 Second leg	Kuusysi (Finland)	0–1 (0–1 agg.)	(Romania) Steaua București	Helsinki
18:30 EET (UTC+2)		Report	Pițurcă 86'	Stadium: Olympic Stadium; Attendance: 32,522; Referee: Vojtech Christov (Czechoslovakia)

==== Semi-finals ====
2 April 1986 First leg	Anderlecht (Belgium)	1–0	(Romania) Steaua București	Brussels
20:00 EEST (UTC+3)	Scifo 78'	Report	Stoica (yellow card) 74'	Stadium: Constant Vanden Stock Stadium; Attendance: 24,000; Referee: Adolf Prokop (East Germany)

16 April 1986 Second leg	Steaua București (Romania)	3–0 (3–1 agg.)	(Belgium) Anderlecht	Bucharest
16:30 EEST (UTC+3)	Pițurcă 4', 70'; Stoica (yellow card) 5'; Balint 22'; Bălan (yellow card) 75'	Report	Andersen (yellow card) 2'; Vercauteren (yellow card) 12'	Stadium: Stadionul Steaua; Attendance: 20,584; Referee: Volker Roth (West Germany)

==== Final ====
7 May 1986 Final	Barcelona (Spain)	0–0 (a.e.t.) (0–2 p)	(Romania) Steaua București	Seville
21:15 EEST (UTC+3)		Report		Stadium: Ramón Sánchez-Pizjuán Stadium; Attendance: 65,000; Referee: Michel Vautrot (France)
	Penalties
	Alexanko (penalty missed); Pedraza (penalty missed); Alonso (penalty missed); Marcos (penalty missed)		(penalty missed) Majearu; (penalty missed) Bölöni; (penalty scored) Lăcătuș; (penalty scored) Balint
