= 1987 Cupa României final =

- Event: 1986–87 Cupa României
Steaua București	Dinamo București
Divizia A	Divizia A
1	0
- Date: 28 June 1987
- Venue: Stadionul Naţional, Bucharest
- Referee: Radu Petrescu (Brașov)
- Attendance: 60,000

The 1987 Cupa României final was the 49th final of Romania's most prestigious football cup competition. It was disputed between Steaua București and Dinamo București, and was won by Steaua București after a game with only one goal. It was the 15th cup for Steaua București.

== Route to the final ==
Steaua București

Round of 32	Gloria Bistrița	3–5	Steaua București
Round of 16	Steaua București	2–0	ICIM Braşov
Quarter-finals	Steaua București	1–0	Rapid București
Semi-finals	Steaua București	4–0	FCM Brașov

Dinamo București

Round of 32	Metalurgistul Cugir	1–4	Dinamo București
Round of 16	Dinamo București	4–0	Explorări Câmpulung Moldovenesc
Quarter-finals	Dinamo București	2–1	Oțelul Galați
Semi-finals	Dinamo București	4–2	Victoria București

== Match details ==
28 June 1987
17:30 EET

Steaua București	1–0	Dinamo București
Bölöni 25'	Report

23 August, Bucharest
Attendance: 60,000
Referee: Radu Petrescu (Brașov)

GK	1	(Romania) Dumitru Stângaciu
DF	2	(Romania) Niță Cireașă (substituted off) 46'
DF	4	(Romania) Ștefan Iovan
DF	6	(Romania) Miodrag Belodedici
DF	3	(Romania) Ilie Bărbulescu
MF	5	(Romania) Iosif Rotariu
MF	8	(Romania) Mihail Majearu (substituted off) 68'
MF	11	(Romania) László Bölöni
MF	10	(Romania) Gheorghe Hagi
FW	7	(Romania) Marius Lăcătuș
FW	9	(Romania) Victor Pițurcă
Substitutions:
DF	12	(Romania) Anton Weissenbacher (substituted in) 46'
FW	13	(Romania) Gabi Balint (substituted in) 68'
Manager:
(Romania) Anghel Iordănescu

GK	1	(Romania) Dumitru Moraru
DF	2	(Romania) Vasile Jercălău
DF	5	(Romania) Alexandru Nicolae (substituted off) 46'
DF	7	(Romania) Lică Movilă
DF	3	(Romania) Ioan Varga
MF	11	(Romania) Dănuț Lupu
MF	6	(Romania) Ioan Andone (red card) 90'
MF	4	(Romania) Mircea Rednic
MF	10	(Romania) Dorin Mateuț
FW	9	(Romania) Rodion Cămătaru
FW	8	(Romania) Marian Damaschin
Substitutions:
MF	16	(Romania) Costel Orac (substituted in) 46'
Manager:
(Romania) Mircea Lucescu

MATCH OFFICIALS

- Assistant referees:
  - (Romania) Ioan Igna
  - (Romania) Dan Petrescu

== See also ==
- List of Cupa României finals
