= ASC Oțelul Galați league record by opponent =

Asociația Supporter Club Oțelul Galați is a professional association football club based in Galați, Romania. The club was founded in 1964.

Oțelul Galați played their first top league fixture on 17 August 1986 against Victoria București. Since that game they have played in 894 first league matches and have faced 60 different sides. Their most regular opponents have been Dinamo București, whom they have played against on 54 occasions. The club has won 22 of the league matches against SR Brașov which represents the most Oțelul have won against any team. They have drawn more matches with Argeș Pitești than with any other club, with 11 of their meetings finishing without a winner. Dinamo București are the side that has defeated Oțelul in more league games than any other club, having won 34 of their encounters.

== Key ==
- The table includes results of matches played by Oțelul Galați in Liga I.
- ‡ Clubs with this background and symbol in the "Club" column are defunct
- The name used for each opponent is the name they had when Oțelul Galați most recently played a league match against them. Results against each opponent include results against that club under any former name. For example, results against Universitatea Cluj include matches played against Știința Cluj.
- P = matches played; W = matches won; D = matches drawn; L = matches lost; F = goals for; A = goals against; Win% = percentage of total matches won
- The columns headed "First" and "Last" contain the first and most recent seasons in which Oțelul Galați played league matches against each opponent

== All-time league record ==
Statistics correct as of matches played on season 2016–17.

Opponent	P	W	D	L	F	A	P	W	D	L	F	A	P	W	D	L	F	A	Win%	First	Last	Notes	
Opponent	Home						Away						Total						Win%	First	Last	Notes	
ASA Târgu Mureș ‡	3	3	0	0	9	2		3	0	2	1	4	5		6	3	2	1	13	14	50.00	1987–88	1991–92
ASA Târgu Mureș ‡	3	1	1	1	1	2		3	2	0	1	4	3		6	3	1	2	5	4	50.00	2010–11	2014–15
Argeș Pitești	18	10	4	4	30	15		18	1	7	10	16	29		36	11	11	14	46	59	30.56	1986–87	2008–09
Astra Giurgiu	11	5	4	2	13	13		11	2	4	5	10	16		22	7	8	7	23	29	31.82	1998–99	2014–15
CFR Cluj	11	1	2	8	6	17		11	3	1	7	8	18		22	4	3	15	14	24	18.18	2004–05	2014–15
CS Mioveni	2	1	1	0	3	1		2	1	0	1	2	2		4	2	1	1	5	5	50.00	2007–08	2011–12
CS Otopeni ‡	1	1	0	0	3	1		1	1	0	0	1	0		2	2	0	0	4	3	100.00	2008–09	2008–09
CS Turnu Severin ‡	1	1	0	0	2	0		1	0	1	0	1	1		2	1	1	0	3	3	50.00	2012–13	2012–13
CSM Reșița	4	3	0	1	10	3		4	3	0	1	7	7		8	6	0	2	17	17	75.00	1992–93	1999–00
CSM Suceava ‡	1	1	0	0	5	1		1	1	0	0	2	1		2	2	0	0	7	6	100.00	1987–88	1987–88
CSMS Iași	2	0	1	1	0	3		2	1	1	0	2	1		4	1	2	1	2	1	25.00	2012–13	2014–15
Ceahlăul Piatra Neamț	18	9	6	3	29	13		18	5	4	9	17	27		36	14	10	12	46	56	38.89	1993–94	2014–15
Chimia Râmnicu Vâlcea ‡	1	1	0	0	4	0		1	0	0	1	0	1		2	1	0	1	4	5	50.00	1986–87	1986–87
Chindia Târgoviște ‡	2	2	0	0	8	2		2	0	1	1	2	4		4	2	1	1	10	12	50.00	1996–97	1997–98
Concordia Chiajna	4	2	1	1	5	3		4	0	2	2	1	5		8	2	3	3	6	10	25.00	2011–12	2014–15
Corona Brașov ‡	1	1	0	0	2	1		1	1	0	0	1	0		2	2	0	0	3	2	100.00	2013–14	2012–13
Corvinul Hunedoara ‡	4	2	1	1	5	3		4	0	0	4	2	12		8	2	1	5	7	17	25.00	1986–87	1991–92
Dacia Unirea Brăila	3	2	1	0	7	4		3	1	0	2	4	5		6	3	1	2	11	12	50.00	1991–92	1992–93
Dinamo București	27	9	6	12	35	41		27	4	1	22	26	66		54	13	7	34	61	101	24.07	1986–87	2014–15
Extensiv Craiova ‡	5	4	1	0	11	2		5	0	0	5	4	15		10	4	1	5	15	26	40.00	1991–92	1998–99
FC Botoșani	2	1	0	1	2	2		2	0	1	1	2	4		4	1	1	2	4	6	25.00	2013–14	2014–15
FC Brașov	22	17	4	1	34	13		22	5	4	13	19	34		44	22	8	14	53	68	50.00	1986–87	2014–15
FC Oneşti ‡	2	2	0	0	5	1		2	1	0	1	3	1		4	3	0	1	8	6	75.00	1998–99	1999–00
FC Oradea ‡	2	1	1	0	1	0		2	1	1	0	2	1		4	2	2	0	3	2	50.00	1988–89	2003–04
FC U Craiova	18	12	3	3	32	13		18	5	2	11	16	28		36	17	5	14	48	60	47.22	1992–93	2010–11
FC Vaslui	9	3	2	4	8	9		9	1	2	6	7	15		18	4	4	10	15	23	22.22	2005–06	2013–14
FCM Bacău ‡	16	10	3	3	26	13		16	3	3	10	10	23		32	13	6	13	36	49	40.63	1986–87	2005–06
FCSB	12	4	3	5	11	15		12	1	1	10	7	27		24	5	4	15	18	38	20.83	2003–04	2014–15
Farul Constanța	18	13	3	2	26	8		18	6	4	8	18	24		36	19	7	10	44	50	52.78	1988–89	2008–09
Flacăra Moreni	3	3	0	0	6	2		3	1	1	1	2	3		6	4	1	1	8	9	66.67	1986–87	1988–89
Foresta Suceava ‡	3	2	1	0	4	0		3	1	1	1	3	3		6	3	2	1	7	7	50.00	1997–98	2000–01
Gaz Metan Mediaș	8	4	3	1	13	6		8	4	3	1	9	4		16	8	6	2	22	17	50.00	2000–01	2014–15
Gloria Bistrița	21	14	7	0	28	6		21	4	2	15	14	35		42	18	9	15	42	63	42.86	1991–92	2012–13
Gloria Buzău	3	1	0	2	4	5		3	2	1	0	6	0		6	3	1	2	10	4	50.00	1986–87	2008–09
Inter Sibiu ‡	6	5	1	0	10	3		6	1	2	3	7	10		12	6	3	3	17	20	50.00	1988–89	1995–96
Internaţional Curtea de Argeș ‡	1	1	0	0	1	0		1	1	0	0	1	0		2	2	0	0	2	1	100.00	2009–10	2009–10
Jiul Petroșani	5	3	1	1	12	3	5	3	2	0	8	2	10	6	3	1	20	14	60.00	1986–87	2006–07		
Maramureş Baia Mare	1	1	0	0	3	0	1	0	1	0	1	1	2	1	1	0	4	4	50.00	1994–95	1994–95		
Naţional București	15	11	1	3	30	18	15	4	5	6	17	22	30	15	6	9	47	52	50.00	1992–93	2006–07		
Olimpia Satu Mare	1	1	0	0	2	0	1	1	0	0	1	0	2	2	0	0	3	2	100.00	1998–99	1998–99		
Olt Scornicești	3	2	1	0	4	1	3	0	0	3	2	8	6	2	1	3	6	12	33.33	1986–87	1988–89		
Pandurii Târgu Jiu	10	6	3	1	13	6	10	3	1	6	13	17	20	9	4	7	26	30	45.00	2005–06	2014–15		
Petrolul Ploiești	18	9	5	4	22	10	18	4	3	11	10	24	36	13	8	15	32	46	36.11	1986–87	2014–15		
Politehnica Iași ‡	7	5	2	0	14	4	7	1	3	3	7	9	14	6	5	3	21	23	42.86	1995–96	2009–10		
Politehnica Timișoara	16	10	4	2	30	17	16	2	2	12	7	27	32	12	6	14	37	57	37.50	1987–88	2013–14		
Rapid București ‡	26	14	6	6	37	27	26	2	4	20	20	59	52	16	10	26	57	96	30.77	1986–87	2014–15		
Rocar București ‡	2	2	0	0	4	2	2	1	0	1	5	4	4	3	0	1	9	8	75.00	1999–00	2000–01		
Sportul Studenţesc București	16	11	2	3	30	12	16	6	3	7	19	23	32	17	5	10	49	53	53.13	1986–87	2011–12		
Steaua București	15	3	2	10	14	25	15	1	0	14	8	37	30	4	2	24	22	51	13.33	1986–87	2002–03		
Săgeata Năvodari ‡	1	0	0	1	0	1	1	0	0	1	1	2	2	0	0	2	1	2	0.00	2013–14	2013–14		
UM Timișoara ‡	1	1	0	0	2	1	1	1	0	0	1	0	2	2	0	0	3	2	100.00	2001–02	2001–02		
UTA Arad	5	4	1	0	8	4	5	1	2	2	3	7	10	5	3	2	11	15	50.00	1993–94	2007–08		
Unirea Alba Iulia	3	3	0	0	6	0	3	1	0	2	6	5	6	4	0	2	12	11	66.67	2003–04	2009–10		
Unirea Urziceni ‡	5	3	0	2	11	11	5	1	2	2	4	4	10	4	2	4	15	15	40.00	2006–07	2010–11		
Universitatea Cluj	16	11	3	2	32	12	16	1	4	11	10	26	32	12	7	13	42	58	37.50	1986–87	2014–15		
Universitatea Craiova	5	4	0	1	8	3	5	1	2	2	5	6	10	5	2	3	13	14	50.00	1986–87	2014–15		
Victoria Brănești ‡	1	0	1	0	1	1	1	1	0	0	2	1	2	1	1	0	3	2	50.00	2010–11	2010–11		
Victoria București ‡	3	2	0	1	5	3	3	1	0	2	4	8	6	3	0	3	9	13	50.00	1986–87	1988–89		
Viitorul Constanța	3	2	1	0	8	2	3	0	1	2	3	7	6	2	2	2	11	15	33.33	2012–13	2014–15		
Voința Sibiu ‡	1	1	0	0	3	0	1	1	0	0	1	0	2	2	0	0	4	3	100.00	2011–12	2011–12		
