= 1986–87 Divizia A =

69th season of top-tier football league in Romania

Divizia A
- Season: 1986–87
- Champions: Steaua București
- Relegated: Jiul Petroşani; Gloria Buzău; Chimia Râmnicu Vâlcea
- European Cup: Steaua București
- Cup Winners' Cup: Dinamo București
- UEFA Cup: Victoria București; Sportul Studenţesc; Universitatea Craiova
- Matches: 306
- Goals: 811 (2.65 per match)
- Top goalscorer: Rodion Camataru (44)
- Biggest home win: Dinamo 10–2 Gloria; Steaua 8–0 Olt
- Biggest away win: Chimia 0–4 Steaua
- Highest scoring: Dinamo 10–2 Gloria
- Longest winning run: Steaua (6)
- Longest unbeaten run: Steaua (34)
- Longest losing run: Chimia (7)

The 1986–87 Divizia A was the sixty-ninth season of Divizia A, the top-level football league of Romania.

== Teams ==
Location of teams in 1986-87 Divizia A

== League table ==
Pos	Team	Pld	W	D	L	GF	GA	GD	Pts	Qualification or relegation
1	Steaua București (C)	34	25	9	0	87	17	+70	59	Qualification to European Cup first round
2	Dinamo București	34	17	10	7	84	46	+38	44	Qualification to Cup Winners' Cup first round
3	Victoria București	34	15	8	11	43	39	+4	38	Qualification to UEFA Cup first round
4	Sportul Studenţesc București	34	14	7	13	55	46	+9	35	Qualification to UEFA Cup first round
5	Universitatea Craiova	34	11	13	10	40	34	+6	35	Qualification to UEFA Cup first round
6	Argeș Pitești	34	12	11	11	28	25	+3	35	Invitation to Balkans Cup
7	Olt Scornicești	34	15	5	14	33	43	−10	35	
8	Petrolul Ploiești	34	9	16	9	26	27	−1	34	
9	Corvinul Hunedoara	34	13	7	14	64	56	+8	33	Invitation to Balkans Cup
10	Universitatea Cluj	34	14	4	16	54	47	+7	32	
11	Oțelul Galați	34	11	10	13	37	36	+1	32	
12	SC Bacău	34	12	8	14	45	52	−7	32	
13	FCM Brașov	34	14	4	16	33	46	−13	32	
14	Rapid București	34	13	6	15	42	55	−13	32	
15	Flacăra Moreni	34	14	4	16	40	55	−15	32	
16	Jiul Petroșani (R)	34	10	7	17	39	49	−10	27	Relegation to Divizia B
17	Gloria Buzău (R)	34	10	5	19	31	66	−35	25	Relegation to Divizia B
18	Chimia Râmnicu Vâlcea (R)	34	7	6	21	30	72	−42	20	Relegation to Divizia B

Source: LT
Rules for classification: 1) points; 2) goal difference; 3) number of goals scored
(C) Champions; (R) Relegated

=== Positions by round ===
Team ╲ Round	1	2	3	4	5	6	7	8	9	10	11	12	13	14	15	16	17	18	19	20	21	22	23	24	25	26	27	28	29	30	31	32	33	34
Argeș Pitești	12	14	6	5	6	5	4	4	4	4	4	6	6	5	7	4	4	5	4	4	4	4	7	4	4	4	4	4	5	5	6	4	5	6
Bacău	9	4	9	4	7	6	5	7	5	7	7	9	8	9	9	11	9	11	12	11	11	11	11	13	13	12	10	9	9	8	8	9	10	12
Brașov	13	18	16	16	11	14	11	14	13	13	10	8	7	8	8	8	7	8	8	8	8	5	5	7	8	9	8	10	12	13	10	13	14	13
Corvinul Hunedoara	5	12	17	15	14	9	13	10	11	9	9	12	12	10	12	9	12	12	13	13	12	12	12	11	11	13	13	13	13	9	12	11	11	9
Universitatea Craiova	16	17	15	14	18	15	17	11	9	12	14	11	13	12	11	10	11	10	9	10	10	10	10	10	10	8	7	5	6	4	5	6	4	5
Dinamo București	6	1	2	2	2	2	2	2	2	2	2	2	2	2	2	2	2	2	2	2	2	2	2	2	2	2	2	2	2	2	2	2	2	2
Flacăra Moreni	4	8	14	17	13	16	16	17	17	16	17	17	17	18	18	18	18	18	18	18	18	18	18	18	18	17	17	16	16	16	15	15	15	15
Gloria Buzău	2	13	18	18	15	17	14	15	15	17	16	16	16	16	15	15	16	16	17	15	14	14	13	14	16	16	16	17	17	17	17	17	17	17
Jiul Petroşani	10	16	8	10	16	18	18	18	18	18	18	18	18	17	17	17	17	17	16	17	17	16	16	16	14	15	15	15	15	15	16	16	16	16
Olt Scornicești	14	6	3	6	3	4	3	3	3	3	3	3	4	6	3	3	3	3	3	5	5	7	4	6	6	6	5	7	4	7	4	5	8	7
Oțelul Galați	3	3	10	12	12	11	10	12	14	10	12	10	11	11	10	13	13	15	14	16	15	15	14	12	12	11	12	12	11	12	13	12	12	11
Petrolul Ploiești	15	15	7	9	4	3	6	5	7	6	5	4	5	4	5	7	6	6	7	6	7	6	8	5	5	5	6	6	7	6	7	7	7	8
Rapid București	7	9	12	11	8	12	12	13	12	14	11	13	10	13	14	14	14	13	11	12	16	17	15	15	15	14	14	14	14	14	14	14	13	14
Chimia Râmnicu Vâlcea	11	7	13	13	17	10	15	16	16	15	15	15	15	15	16	16	15	14	15	14	13	13	17	17	17	18	18	18	18	18	18	18	18	18
Sportul Studențesc București	1	5	5	8	10	13	9	8	6	5	8	7	9	7	4	5	8	7	6	7	6	8	6	8	7	7	11	8	10	11	11	8	6	4
Steaua București	8	2	1	1	1	1	1	1	1	1	1	1	1	1	1	1	1	1	1	1	1	1	1	1	1	1	1	1	1	1	1	1	1	1
Universitatea Cluj	18	10	4	3	5	8	8	6	8	11	13	14	14	14	13	12	10	9	10	9	9	9	9	9	9	10	9	11	8	10	9	10	9	10
Victoria București	17	11	11	7	9	7	7	9	10	8	6	5	3	3	6	6	5	4	5	3	3	3	3	3	3	3	3	3	3	3	3	3	3	3

Source: LT (in Romanian)

=== Results ===
Home \ Away	ARG	BAC	BRA	COR	UCR	DIN	FLA	GBU	JIU	OLT	OȚE	PET	RAP	RAM	SPO	STE	UCL	VIB
Argeș Pitești	—	0–0	3–0	1–0	0–0	0–2	1–1	4–0	2–1	0–0	1–0	1–1	1–0	1–0	1–0	0–1	2–1	2–0
Bacău	1–0	—	3–0	4–0	1–0	2–1	1–1	3–0	0–1	1–0	0–0	1–1	2–1	3–0	1–0	2–2	0–0	5–1
Brașov	1–0	1–0	—	4–0	0–0	0–1	0–1	2–1	2–0	1–0	4–1	1–0	2–1	2–0	3–2	0–2	1–0	0–0
Corvinul Hunedoara	0–2	4–1	4–0	—	2–1	3–5	5–1	7–0	3–0	5–0	2–1	1–0	1–1	6–2	2–0	2–3	5–3	2–1
Universitatea Craiova	2–2	3–0	4–0	0–0	—	1–1	3–0	0–0	1–0	2–0	1–1	0–0	1–0	5–0	1–1	1–1	1–0	3–2
Dinamo București	3–0	4–1	2–0	3–3	1–1	—	2–3	10–2	6–2	1–0	2–0	3–0	2–0	7–0	0–1	1–1	2–0	4–4
Flacăra Moreni	1–0	2–1	0–1	1–0	4–1	1–3	—	2–0	1–0	2–1	0–0	0–2	3–1	2–1	1–0	0–0	4–1	2–1
Gloria Buzău	0–0	1–0	2–2	2–1	2–0	0–1	3–1	—	1–0	1–2	0–0	0–1	3–0	3–1	2–2	1–3	1–0	1–0
Jiul Petroşani	1–2	1–1	2–0	4–2	3–0	2–0	4–1	3–1	—	1–3	0–0	1–2	1–1	3–1	1–0	2–2	2–0	0–0
Olt Scornicești	1–0	2–0	3–1	0–0	2–0	0–0	2–0	0–2	1–0	—	3–1	1–0	1–1	2–0	0–1	0–3	2–1	1–0
Oțelul Galați	2–0	3–1	1–0	1–1	1–0	3–3	2–1	1–0	3–1	3–1	—	0–0	5–0	4–0	0–1	0–2	1–3	2–0
Petrolul Ploiești	0–0	1–1	2–0	0–0	1–1	2–2	1–0	3–0	0–0	0–0	0–0	—	3–0	1–0	1–1	1–1	1–0	0–0
Rapid București	0–0	4–1	2–0	1–0	3–1	4–3	3–1	2–0	3–0	1–0	1–0	2–1	—	1–2	1–0	1–1	1–2	1–0
Chimia Râmnicu Vâlcea	0–0	1–2	0–1	1–1	1–0	1–4	1–0	6–1	1–1	1–2	1–0	0–0	1–1	—	2–1	0–4	3–1	0–0
Sportul Studențesc București	2–0	5–3	4–4	4–0	2–3	5–4	2–1	2–0	1–0	0–1	1–1	2–0	7–2	2–1	—	1–2	3–0	1–1
Steaua București	1–0	4–1	2–0	4–0	1–1	3–0	4–0	4–1	3–0	8–0	2–0	3–0	3–1	2–0	4–0	—	7–0	2–0
Universitatea Cluj	1–0	3–0	1–0	4–2	1–2	0–0	6–1	1–0	3–1	4–1	2–0	3–0	5–0	6–0	1–1	1–1	—	0–1
Victoria București	2–2	5–2	2–0	1–0	1–0	1–1	2–1	2–0	2–1	2–1	2–0	2–1	2–1	3–2	2–0	0–1	1–0	—

Source: LT (in Romanian)
Legend: Blue = home team win; Yellow = draw; Red = away team win.

== Top goalscorers ==
Position	Player	Club	Goals
1	Rodion Cămătaru	Dinamo București	44
2	Victor Pițurcă	Steaua București	22
3	Gheorghe Hagi	Sportul Studenţesc / Steaua București	15
3	Ioan Petcu	Corvinul Hunedoara	15
5	Ion Cojocaru	Corvinul Hunedoara	14

== Champion squad ==
Steaua București

Goalkeepers: Dumitru Stângaciu (33 / 0); Constantin Blid (2 / 0).
Defenders: Ștefan Iovan (32 / 3); Adrian Bumbescu (25 / 2); Miodrag Belodedici (32 / 5); Anton Weissenbacher (29 / 4); Ilie Bărbulescu (14 / 1); Niță Cireașă (15 / 3); Eugen Daniel Popescu (1 / 0); Virgil Petcu (1 / 0); Mihai Dorobanțu (1 / 0); Lucian Adrian Giurcă (1 / 0).
Midfielders: Lucian Bălan (23 / 1); Tudorel Stoica (25 / 1); Mihail Majearu (27 / 3); László Bölöni (28 / 10); Iosif Rotariu (15 / 2); Toma Ivan (12 / 1); Viorel Breniuc (1 / 0); Marian Alexandru (1 / 0); Ion Manea (1 / 0); Marin Petrache (1 / 0).
Forwards: Gabi Balint (31 / 5); Marius Lăcătuș (27 / 9); Victor Pițurcă (31 / 22); Gheorghe Hagi (14 / 10); Viorel Turcu (5 / 0); Ioan Kramer (8 / 2); Ilie Dumitrescu (2 / 0); Ion Craiu (1 / 0); Marian Mirea (1 / 0).
(league appearances and goals listed in brackets)

Manager: Emerich Jenei / Anghel Iordănescu.

== Attendances ==
No.	Club	Average
1	Steaua	21,118
2	Oţelul	18,471
3	Craiova	16,882
4	FC Rapid	15,824
5	Petrolul	13,294
6	Argeş	13,059
7	Dinamo 1948	12,118
8	Gloria	12,059
9	U Cluj	12,000
10	Bacău	11,588
11	Braşov	11,353
12	Hunedoara	9,353
13	Jiul	9,353
14	Râmnicu Vâlcea	8,059
15	Flacăra	7,412
16	Sportul Studenţesc	6,647
17	Olt Scorniceşti	6,294
18	Victoria Bucureşti	5,941

== See also ==
- 1986–87 Divizia B
