= Rotariu =

Rotariu is a Romanian surname stemming from the word rotar, which means wheelwright. It that may refer to

- Dorin Rotariu (born 1995), Romanian football player
- Iosif Rotariu (born 1962), Romanian football midfielder, uncle of Dorin
