= Anton Weissenbacher =

Romanian footballer

Personal information
- Date of birth: 20 January 1965 (age 61)
- Place of birth: Baia Mare, Maramureș County, Romania
- Height: 1.77 m (5 ft 10 in)
- Position: Right back

Senior career*
Years	Team	Apps	(Gls)
1983–1985	FC Baia Mare	48	(2)
1985–1987	Steaua București	43	(5)
1987–1988	Universitatea Craiova	9	(0)
1988–1991	Bihor Oradea	68	(8)
1991–1999	Eintracht Trier	111	(8)
Total		279	(23)

International career
1984–1985	Romania U21	8	(0)
1986–1987	Romania Olympic	7	(0)
1987	Romania	1	(0)

Managerial career
- SV Mehring
- * Club domestic league appearances and goals

Anton Weissenbacher (born 20 January 1965) is a former Romanian football right back who was part of Steaua București's squad that won the European Cup in 1986, also playing in the Intercontinental Cup final of the same year. When he left Romania, during the early 1990s he went to play in Germany in an amateur league and there he finished his career. Afterwards he coached several amateur teams in Germany, including SV Mehring.

== Club career ==
Weissenbacher was born on 20 January 1965 in Baia Mare, Maramureș County, Romania, being of German descent. He made his Divizia A debut on 16 November 1983, playing for FC Baia Mare under coach Paul Popescu in a 4–0 home win against Politehnica Iași. In 1985, Weissenbacher joined Steaua București where in his first season, he helped the club win the title, contributing with one goal scored in the 15 league appearances given to him by coach Emerich Jenei. The coach also used him in one match in the historical European Cup campaign, appearing in the final minutes of the 3–0 win in the semi-finals against Anderlecht. Weissenbacher started the 1986–87 season by playing in both legs in the 3–1 loss to Anderlecht in the second round of the European Cup. Subsequently, he played the entire match in the 1–0 loss to River Plate in the Intercontinental Cup. Weissenbacher finished the season by winning The Double, as coaches Jenei and Anghel Iordănescu gave him 29 league appearances in which he scored four goals, including one in a 1–1 draw against rivals Dinamo București. He also was sent at halftime to replace Niță Cireașă in the 1–0 victory in the Cupa României final over Dinamo.

Afterwards, Weissenbacher went to Universitatea Craiova where he made his fourth and last appearance in a European competition, a 3–2 win over Chaves in the first round of the 1987–88 UEFA Cup. After only one season he left Craiova to join Bihor Oradea where he spent three seasons, making his last Divizia A appearance on 2 June 1991 in a 4–1 home win over FC Bacău, totaling 168 matches with 15 goals in the competition. In 1991 he left Romania to work in Germany, but he also played football in the lower leagues for Eintracht Trier until 1999. The highlight of this period was the elimination of Schalke 04 and Borussia Dortmund in the 1997–98 DFB-Pokal campaign, as the team reached the semi-finals where they were eliminated by MSV Duisburg.

== International career ==
Between 1984 and 1987, Weissenbacher made eight appearances for Romania's under-21 squad and seven for the Olympic side.

He played one friendly game for Romania, making his appearance on 8 April 1987, as coach Emerich Jenei used him as a starter in a 3–2 home victory against Israel.

== Coaching career ==
After he ended his career, Weissenbacher coached the amateur team SV Mehring for a while, where one of the players was his son, Rolland.

== Honours ==
Steaua București

- Divizia A: 1985–86, 1986–87
- Cupa României: 1986–87
- European Cup: 1985–86
- Intercontinental Cup runner-up: 1986

Eintracht Trier

- Oberliga Südwest: 1993–94
