= Tudorel Stoica =

Romanian football player/manager

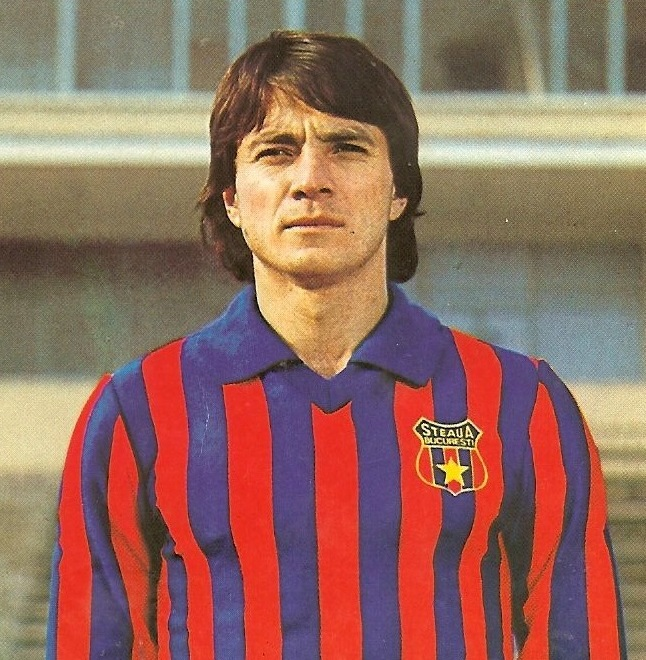
- Stoica in Steaua Bucharest jersey in the 1970s

Personal information
- Date of birth: 7 September 1954 (age 72)
- Place of birth: Brăila, Romania
- Height: 1.77 m (5 ft 10 in)
- Position: Midfielder

Youth career
- 1968–1971: Politehnica Galaţi

Senior career*
Years	Team	Apps	(Gls)
1972–1974	CSU Galaţi	56	(9)
1974–1975	FCM Galaţi	8	(0)
1975–1989	Steaua București	369	(43)
1989–1990	Lens	17	(0)
1990–1991	Steaua București	1	(0)
Total		446	(52)

International career
1979–1987	Romania	15	(0)

Managerial career
- 1991–1992: Steaua București (assistant)
- 1993–1994: Steaua București (assistant)
- 1998–1999: Romania U21
- * Club domestic league appearances and goals

Tudorel Stoica (born 7 September 1954) is a Romanian former professional footballer who played as a midfielder. He holds the record for the most club appearances for Steaua București.

He is widely regarded as one of the most successful players to have played in the Liga I. He ranks second in the all-time list of league championships won, alongside Giedrius Arlauskis, Ciprian Deac, Adrian Bumbescu, Mircea Lucescu and Dumitru Stângaciu, with seven titles each, while Marius Lăcătuș leads the ranking with ten championships.

== Club career ==
Stoica made his Liga I debuts with FCM Galaţi in 1974, having previously played for CSU Galaţi in the Liga II.

After only one season, he transferred to country giants Steaua București where, safe for his first year, he was a nuclear midfield element as the team won – that season included – seven league titles and five domestic cups. He was a main player and captain of the squad that won the first European title in Romanian football's history, the 1985–86 European Cup, even though he did not play in the final against FC Barcelona, because of accumulation of yellow cards.

In 1989, 35-year-old Stoica moved abroad for the first time, playing one season in France with Ligue 2 side Lens, returning to Steaua where he finished his career at the age of 37. The longtime team captain amassed totals of 369 games and 43 goals (377 counting with FCM Galaţi) in his country's top division, over the course of 15 professional seasons; in the early 1990s, he had brief spells as assistant manager with Steaua București and as head coach Romania U21.

On 25 March 2008, Stoica was decorated by Romanian president Traian Băsescu with the Ordinul "Meritul Sportiv" – ("The Sportive Merit" Order) class II, for his part in the winning of the 1985–86 European Cup.

== International career ==
During eight years, Stoica was capped 15 times for the Romania national team, but did not attend any major international tournament.

He made his debut on 14 October 1979 in a 3–1 friendly loss with the Soviet Union.

== Personal life ==
Stoica was born in Brăila.

After retiring from football, he served as scout for Belgian club Anderlecht. His son, Alin, was also a footballer and a midfielder. He also represented Steaua and the Romania national team, and played mainly in Belgium, representing four clubs.

== Honours ==
=== Player ===
Steaua București

- Divizia A: 1975–76, 1977–78, 1984–85, 1985–86, 1986–87, 1987–88, 1988–89
- Romanian Cup: 1975–76, 1978–79, 1984–85, 1986–87, 1988–89
- European Cup: 1985–86
- UEFA Super Cup: 1986
