= Dumitru Stângaciu =

Romanian footballer and coach (born 1964)

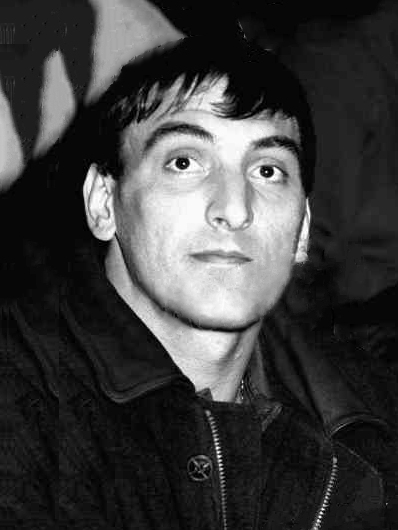
- Stângaciu in 1992

Personal information
- Full name: Dan Dumitru Stângaciu
- Date of birth: 9 August 1964 (age 62)
- Place of birth: Braşov, Romania
- Height: 1.93 m (6 ft 4 in)
- Position: Goalkeeper

Team information
- Current team: Corona Brașov (GK coach)

Youth career
- –1982: OJT Predeal

Senior career*
Years	Team	Apps	(Gls)
1982–1984	FCM Braşov^{1}	5	(0)
1984–1995	Steaua București	191	(0)
1988–1989	→ Olt Scorniceşti (loan)	16	(0)
1995–1996	Vanspor	23	(0)
1996–2000	Kocaelispor	94	(0)
Total		329	(0)

International career
1992–1998	Romania	5	(0)

Managerial career
- 2002–2004: Poli AEK Timișoara (GK coach)
- 2005–2006: Wisła Kraków (GK coach)
- 2006–2009: Unirea Urziceni (GK coach)
- 2009–2012: Kuban Krasnodar (GK coach)
- 2012–2014: Dynamo Moscow (GK coach)
- 2014: Al-Arabi (GK coach)
- 2015: ASA Târgu Mureș (GK coach)
- 2015–2016: Jiangsu Suning (GK coach)
- 2016: Kuban Krasnodar (GK coach)
- 2016–2017: Al-Nasr (GK coach)
- 2018–2020: Al Hazem (GK coach)
- 2020–2023: Baniyas (GK coach)
- 2023–2024: Ajman (GK coach)
- 2024: Khor Fakkan (GK coach)
- 2025: Baniyas (GK coach)
- 2025–: Corona Brașov (GK coach)
- * Club domestic league appearances and goals

Dan Dumitru Stângaciu (born 9 August 1964) is a Romanian former professional footballer who currently serves as a goalkeeping coach for Liga IV club Corona Brașov. He is best known for his spell with Steaua București in the 1980s and 1990s where he won the European Cup in 1986 and the European Super Cup in 1987.

He is widely regarded as one of the most successful players to have played in the Romanian First League. He ranks second in the all-time list of league championships won, alongside Giedrius Arlauskis, Ciprian Deac, Adrian Bumbescu, Mircea Lucescu and Tudorel Stoica, with 7 titles each. Marius Lăcătuș won it 10 times and is ranked 1st.

== Career ==
At the age of 18, Stângaciu signed for FCM Brașov, but after just two years, he was transferred to Steaua București, being the second goalkeeper option of the coach Emerich Jenei. As Helmut Duckadam retired from football in 1986, Stângaciu becomes the first option of the new coach, Anghel Iordănescu.

He spent the 1988–89 season on loan to FC Olt Scorniceşti, as Steaua preferred to sign Silviu Lung, but returned in Bucharest one year later.

In 1995, Stângaciu began a new chapter in his career by moving to Süper Lig, played for Vanspor and Kocaelispor.

Stângaciu was Romanian football champion in 1985, 1986, 1987, 1988, 1989, 1993, 1994, 1995, won the Cupa României in 1985, 1987 and 1992 and the Turkish Cup in 1997. He also won five caps for Romania, being part of the squad who played at the World Cup 1998.

On 25 March 2008, he was decorated by the president of Romania, Traian Băsescu for the winning of the 1985–86 European Cup with Ordinul "Meritul Sportiv" — (The Order "The Sportive Merit") class II.

== Career statistics ==
Romania
Year	Apps	Goals
1992	1	0
1994	1	0
1997	1	0
1998	2	0
Total	5	0

== Honours ==
FCM Braşov

- Divizia B: 1983–84

Steaua București

- Divizia A: 1984–85, 1985–86, 1986–87, 1987–88, 1992–93, 1993–94, 1994–95
- Cupa României: 1984–85, 1986–87, 1991–92
- Supercupa României: 1994
- European Cup: 1985–86
- UEFA Super Cup: 1986
- Intercontinental Cup runner-up: 1986

Kocaelispor

- Turkish Cup: 1996–97

== Notes ==
^{^1} The 1983–1984 appearances and goals made for FCM Braşov are unavailable.
