= Nicolae Soare (footballer) =

Romanian footballer

Personal information
- Date of birth: 16 April 1964 (age 62)
- Place of birth: Bucharest, Romania
- Height: 1.82 m (6 ft 0 in)
- Position: Forward

Youth career
- 1980–1981: Luceafărul București

Senior career*
Years	Team	Apps	(Gls)
1982–1983	Politehnica Iași	4	(0)
1983–1984	Dunărea Galați	27	(3)
1984	Steaua București	2	(0)
1985–1987	ASA Târgu Mureș (Note: The statistics for the 1986–87 Divizia B season are unavailable.)	47	(6)
1987–1990	Gloria Bistrița		
Total		80	(9)

International career
1984–1985	Romania U21	12	(2)
1984	Romania	1	(0)
- * Club domestic league appearances and goals

Nicolae Soare (born 16 April 1964) is a Romanian former footballer who played as a forward. His father who was also named Nicolae Soare was a sports commentator.

== International career ==
Nicolae Soare played one friendly game at international level for Romania in a 1–0 victory against China when he came as a substitute and replaced Romulus Gabor in the 63rd minute of the game.

== Honours ==
Steaua București

- Divizia A: 1984–85

ASA Târgu Mureș

- Divizia B: 1986–87

Gloria Bistrița

- Divizia B: 1989–90
