= Constantin Pistol =

Romanian footballer

Personal information
- Date of birth: 12 June 1967 (age 59)
- Place of birth: Sibiu, Romania
- Position: Midfielder

Senior career*
Years	Team	Apps	(Gls)
1985–1986	Steaua București	4	(0)
1986–1988	Rapid București		
1989	Olt Scornicești		
1990	Steaua București	10	(1)
1990	Argeș Pitești	7	(2)
1994–1995	Național București		
Total		21	(3)

International career
1986–1987	Romania U21	6	(0)
- * Club domestic league appearances and goals

Constantin Pistol (born 12 June 1967) is a Romanian former footballer who played for Steaua București and was part of their team that won the European Cup in the 1985–86 season, appearing in only one game when he was sent to replace Gabi Balint for the last 7 minutes of the first leg of the semi-final against Anderlecht. He has a total of 146 Divizia A appearances in which he scored 19 goals and 4 matches played in European competitions.

On 25 March 2008 he was decorated by the president of Romania, Traian Băsescu with Ordinul "Meritul Sportiv" – (The Order "The Sportive Merit") class II for his part in winning the 1986 European Cup Final.

== Honours ==
Steaua București

- Divizia A: 1985–86
- European Cup: 1985–86
