= Ilie Bărbulescu (footballer) =

Romanian footballer (1957–2020)

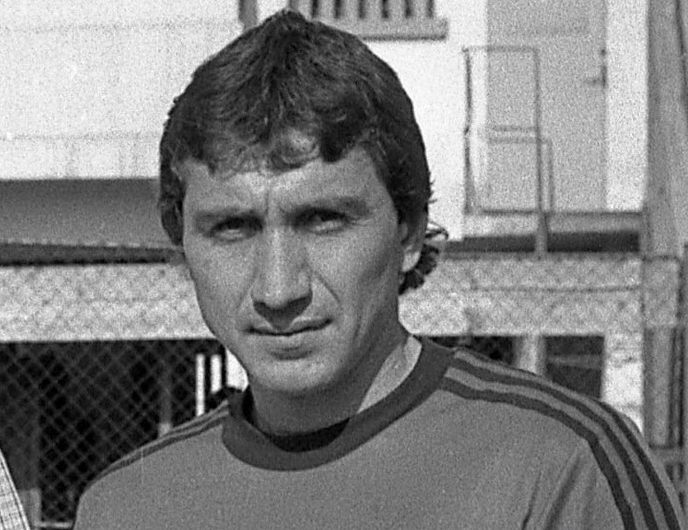
- Bărbulescu in 1986

Personal information
- Full name: Ilie Bărbulescu
- Date of birth: 24 June 1957
- Place of birth: Pitești, Romania
- Date of death: 1 February 2020 (aged 62)
- Place of death: Pitești, Romania
- Height: 1.75 m (5 ft 9 in)
- Position: Left back

Youth career
- 1971–1974: Argeș Pitești

Senior career*
Years	Team	Apps	(Gls)
1974–1982	Argeș Pitești	209	(14)
1982–1983	Olt Scornicești	45	(5)
1983–1984	Petrolul Ploiești	17	(0)
1984–1987	Steaua București	77	(3)
1987	Petrolul Ploiești	6	(0)
1987–1988	Argeș Pitești	3	(0)
1988–1989	Dacia Pitești		
1989–1991	Callatis Mangalia		
Total		357	(22)

International career
1979–1987	Romania	5	(0)
- * Club domestic league appearances and goals

Ilie Bărbulescu (24 June 1957 – 1 February 2020) was a Romanian footballer, and a member of Steaua București's winning squad for the European Cup in 1986 and for the European Supercup in 1987.

== Club career ==
Bărbulescu, nicknamed "Balamuc" (Madhouse), was born on 24 June 1957 in Pitești, Romania and began playing junior-level football in 1971 at local club Argeș where he worked with coach Leonte Ianovschi. He made his Divizia A debut on 9 November 1974 under coach Florin Halagian in a 1–1 draw against FCM Reșița. In the 1978–79 UEFA Cup he helped Argeș eliminate Panathinaikos in the first round with a 5–1 aggregate victory. In the following one they met Valencia led by Mario Kempes, earning a 2–1 win in the first leg, but they lost the second one with 5–2, thus the campaign ended. In the same season he helped Argeș win the title, being used by coach Halagian in 30 games in which he scored one goal. In the following season they defeated AEK Athens in the first round of the 1979–80 European Cup, the team being eliminated in the following one by title holders and eventual winners, Nottingham Forest against whom Bărbulescu scored once. In 1982 he joined Olt Scornicești where he worked once again with Halagian. After one and a half years he went to play for Petrolul Ploiești.

In 1984, Bărbulescu joined Steaua București, reuniting for a while with Halagian, helping the club win The Double in his first season as Halagian and Emerich Jenei used him in 30 league matches but did not play in the 2–1 victory in the Cupa României final over Universitatea Craiova. In the following season, he won the league title, scoring two goals in the 33 appearances given to him by Jenei. The coach also used him in all nine games in the historical European Cup campaign, in which Bărbulescu scored a goal from 25 meters against Budapest Honvéd. He then played the entire match, including extra time, in the eventual 2–0 victory after the penalty shoot-out in the final against Barcelona. After goalkeeper Helmut Duckadam defended the last penalty, Bărbulescu immediately went and picked up the trophy and kissed it, receiving a $20,000 fine from UEFA. Eventually, Steaua's president, Ion Alecsandrescu spoke to Valentin Ceaușescu and Yiorgos Vardinogiannis, who helped him get rid of the fine. He started the 1986–87 season by playing all the minutes in the 1–0 win over Dynamo Kyiv in the European Super Cup and in the loss in the Intercontinental Cup with the same score against River Plate. At the match against River Plate in Tokyo, representatives of the Canon company gave Bărbulescu their latest Canon camera, a gesture stemming from an incident during the 1986 European Cup final against Barcelona. In that match, he famously crashed into a Canon-inscribed billboard after a shoulder-to-shoulder duel with Lobo Carrasco, an incident the company found particularly memorable. He finished the season by winning another Double with Steaua, as coaches Jenei and Anghel Iordănescu gave him 14 league appearances in which he scored once, also appearing for the full 90 minutes in the 1–0 victory in the Cupa României final over Dinamo București.

In 1987, Bărbulescu made a comeback to Petrolul Ploiești, but after half a year he went for a second spell at Argeș Pitești where on 19 March 1988 he made his last Divizia A appearance in a 1–0 home loss to Universitatea Craiova. He accumulated a total of 357 matches and 22 goals scored in the Romanian top-league and 23 games with three goals in European competitions. Bărbulescu ended his career in 1991, after playing in the Romanian lower leagues for Dacia Pitești and Callatis Mangalia, helping the latter promote from the third league to the second.

== International career ==
Bărbulescu played five games for Romania, making his debut on 13 May 1979 under coach Florin Halagian in a 1–1 draw against Cyprus in the Euro 1980 qualifiers. He also played in a 3–1 win over Turkey in the 1986 World Cup qualifiers which took place at the İzmir Atatürk Stadium. Afterwards he made his last appearance for the national team on 4 March 1987 in a friendly against Turkey which ended with another 3–1 victory, played at the Ankara 19 Mayıs Stadium.

== Personal life ==
Bărbulescu was awarded the Honorary Citizen of Pitești title.

On 25 March 2008 he was decorated by the president of Romania, Traian Băsescu with Ordinul "Meritul Sportiv" — (The Order "The Sportive Merit") class II for his part in winning the 1985–86 European Cup.

== Death ==
Aged 62, Bărbulescu was found dead by his wife in their home in Pitești on 1 February 2020, after suffering a heart attack in his sleep. Around 600 people participated at his funeral, held in his native Pitești.

== Honours ==
Argeș Pitești

- Divizia A: 1978–79

Steaua București

- Divizia A: 1984–85, 1985–86, 1986–87
- Cupa României: 1984–85, 1986–87
- European Cup: 1985–86
- European Supercup: 1986
- Intercontinental Cup runner-up: 1986

Callatis Mangalia

- Divizia C: 1989–90
