= 1984–85 Divizia A =

67th season of top-tier football league in Romania

Divizia A
- Season: 1984–85
- Champions: Steaua București
- Relegated: Jiul Petroşani; FC Baia Mare; Poli Iași
- Matches: 306
- Goals: 781 (2.55 per match)
- Top goalscorer: Gheorghe Hagi (20)
- Biggest home win: Sportul 7–0 Chimia
- Biggest away win: Buzău 0–3 Sportul; Scornicești 0–3 Steaua
- Highest scoring: Poli Iași 5–3 ASA
- Longest winning run: Steaua (12)
- Longest unbeaten run: Dinamo (20)
- Longest winless run: Poli Iași (9)
- Longest losing run: Chimia, Poli Iași (7)

The 1984–85 Divizia A was the sixty-seventh season of Divizia A, the top-level football league of Romania.

== Teams ==
Location of teams in 1984-85 Divizia A

== League table ==
Pos	Team	Pld	W	D	L	GF	GA	GD	Pts	Qualification or relegation
1	Steaua București (C)	34	23	8	3	71	24	+47	54	Qualification to European Cup first round
2	Dinamo București	34	21	10	3	59	31	+28	52	Qualification to UEFA Cup first round
3	Sportul Studenţesc București	34	20	8	6	71	28	+43	48	Qualification to UEFA Cup first round
4	Universitatea Craiova	34	17	5	12	61	46	+15	39	Qualification to Cup Winners' Cup first round
5	Gloria Buzău	34	13	8	13	51	51	0	34	Invitation to Balkans Cup
6	ASA Târgu Mureș	34	13	7	14	32	32	0	33	Invitation to Balkans Cup
7	Argeș Pitești	34	12	8	14	44	35	+9	32	
8	Corvinul Hunedoara	34	15	2	17	51	52	−1	32	
9	Politehnica Timișoara	34	12	8	14	35	52	−17	32	
10	Bihor Oradea	34	13	5	16	39	43	−4	31	
11	Rapid București	34	10	10	14	36	43	−7	30	
12	FCM Brașov	34	13	4	17	33	41	−8	30	
13	Olt Scornicești	34	13	4	17	34	52	−18	30	
14	Chimia Râmnicu Vâlcea	34	11	7	16	26	50	−24	29	
15	SC Bacău	34	11	6	17	36	41	−5	28	
16	Jiul Petroșani (R)	34	11	6	17	36	58	−22	28	Relegation to Divizia B
17	FC Baia Mare (R)	34	11	4	19	30	46	−16	26	Relegation to Divizia B
18	Politehnica Iași (R)	34	8	8	18	36	56	−20	24	Relegation to Divizia B

Source: LT
Rules for classification: 1) points; 2) goal difference; 3) number of goals scored
(C) Champions; (R) Relegated

=== Results ===
Home \ Away	ASA	ARG	BAC	BAI	BHO	BRA	COR	UCR	DIN	GBU	JIU	OLT	PIA	RAP	RAM	SPO	STE	POL
ASA Târgu Mureș	—	0–0	1–0	1–1	2–0	2–1	2–0	2–0	0–1	0–0	1–0	6–1	1–0	2–0	2–0	0–0	0–0	2–0
Argeș Pitești	3–0	—	3–1	2–0	3–0	3–2	4–0	0–2	0–0	1–1	2–0	0–1	4–0	3–0	2–0	2–1	0–1	3–0
Bacău	2–0	0–0	—	3–0	1–1	2–0	2–0	2–0	3–0	0–2	2–0	1–0	3–1	3–0	1–0	0–0	0–1	0–0
Baia Mare	1–0	2–0	3–1	—	2–0	3–1	2–0	0–1	0–0	1–2	2–0	1–0	0–1	1–0	0–1	1–1	0–1	3–0
Bihor Oradea	0–1	2–0	1–0	3–1	—	2–1	2–1	2–0	0–1	3–1	3–0	1–0	3–0	1–1	4–2	2–0	1–3	2–0
Brașov	1–0	2–2	2–1	3–1	1–0	—	1–0	2–0	2–0	2–3	0–0	3–0	1–0	0–0	3–0	1–0	1–1	1–0
Corvinul Hunedoara	1–0	2–0	3–2	1–3	1–0	4–0	—	2–1	2–2	5–1	4–2	2–1	5–0	1–0	2–0	4–2	2–1	2–0
Universitatea Craiova	1–0	2–1	2–0	5–0	3–1	1–0	3–1	—	2–4	6–1	1–0	3–2	3–3	1–1	5–2	0–1	5–2	2–0
Dinamo București	1–0	3–2	2–0	2–0	4–0	2–0	2–1	0–0	—	2–0	3–1	4–0	4–3	1–1	4–2	1–2	0–0	3–2
Gloria Buzău	2–1	3–2	3–0	2–0	3–0	3–0	3–1	2–2	0–0	—	1–1	3–1	1–1	3–1	0–0	0–3	1–2	5–0
Jiul Petroșani	2–0	2–0	2–2	1–1	1–0	1–0	1–0	4–3	1–1	2–1	—	2–1	2–0	4–1	1–1	0–2	2–3	2–0
Olt Scornicești	1–1	1–0	2–1	2–1	1–1	2–1	2–0	1–0	0–1	1–0	3–0	—	2–1	1–1	2–0	0–2	0–3	3–1
Politehnica Iași	5–3	2–0	1–0	1–0	0–0	0–1	4–0	1–2	1–2	1–0	4–0	1–1	—	0–0	0–0	0–0	0–1	2–2
Rapid București	1–0	0–0	2–1	1–0	1–0	1–0	1–0	1–1	2–3	1–1	5–1	4–0	3–1	—	3–0	2–4	0–2	0–1
Chimia Râmnicu Vâlcea	0–1	0–0	2–0	2–0	2–1	1–0	1–1	1–0	0–1	2–1	1–0	0–1	2–0	1–0	—	1–0	0–2	0–0
Sportul Studenţesc București	3–0	2–1	5–1	4–0	3–1	1–0	1–0	3–1	3–3	3–3	2–0	2–0	5–0	2–2	7–0	—	0–0	5–1
Steaua București	3–0	0–0	1–0	3–0	2–2	3–0	4–2	4–1	1–2	3–0	6–1	3–0	1–0	2–0	4–0	1–1	—	4–1
Politehnica Timișoara	1–1	3–1	1–1	1–0	1–0	2–0	2–1	0–2	0–0	3–1	2–0	2–1	2–1	2–0	2–2	2–1	1–1	—

Source: LT (in Romanian)
Legend: Blue = home team win; Yellow = draw; Red = away team win.

== Top goalscorers ==
Position	Player	Club	Goals
1	Gheorghe Hagi	Sportul Studenţesc	20
2	Victor Pițurcă	Steaua București	19
3	Rodion Cămătaru	Universitatea Craiova	18
4	Mircea Sandu	Sportul Studenţesc	17
5	Dudu Georgescu	Gloria Buzău	16
5	Petre Grosu	Bihor Oradea	16

== Champion squad ==
Steaua București

Goalkeepers: Helmut Duckadam (31 / 0); Dumitru Stângaciu (6 / 0).
Defenders: Ilie Bărbulescu (30 / 0); Ștefan Iovan (28 / 0); Adrian Bumbescu (32 / 0); Augustin Eduard (24 / 0); Miodrag Belodedici (25 / 3); Daniel Laurențiu (3 / 0); Ioan Tătăran (11 / 1).
Midfielders: Marcel Pușcaș (21 / 2); Tudorel Stoica (30 / 6); Mihail Majearu (32 / 10); Ștefan Petcu (19 / 4); Gabi Balint (28 / 5); László Bölöni (24 / 3).
Forwards: Marius Lăcătuș (29 / 8); Marin Radu (23 / 7); Victor Pițurcă (32 / 19); Nicolae Soare (2 / 0).
(league appearances and goals listed in brackets)

Manager: Florin Halagian / Emerich Jenei.

== Attendances ==
No.	Club	Average
1	Steaua	26,765
2	FC Rapid	22,765
3	Dinamo 1948	21,941
4	Timișoara	19,765
5	Craiova	17,059
6	Sportul Studențesc	16,324
7	Gloria	16,059
8	Brașov	11,059
9	Bihor	10,941
10	Baia Mare	10,294
11	Bacău	10,176
12	Râmnicu Vâlcea	9,235
13	Argeș	8,088
14	Târgu Mureș	8,000
15	Hunedoara	7,471
16	Jiul	7,294
17	Iași	6,235
18	Olt Scornicești	5,647

== See also ==
- 1984–85 Divizia B
