= Adrian Bumbescu =

Romanian footballer

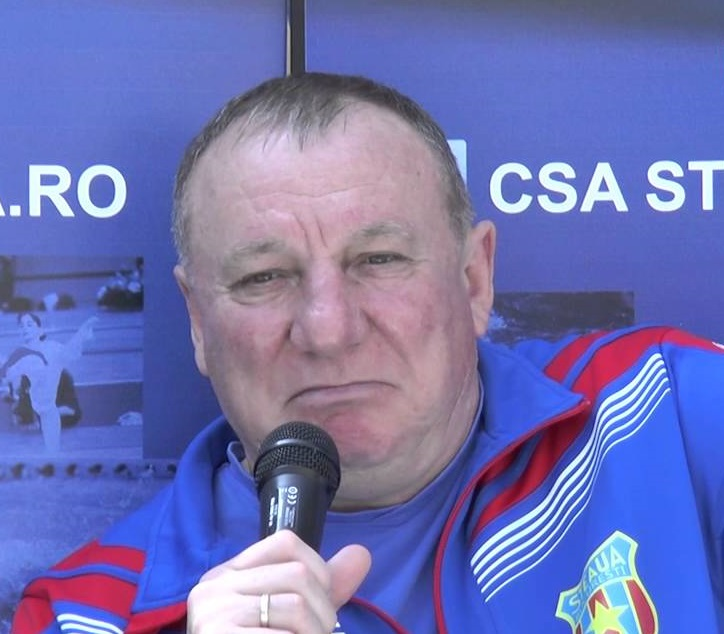
- Bumbescu at Steaua București in 2016

Personal information
- Date of birth: 23 February 1960 (age 66)
- Place of birth: Craiova, Romania
- Height: 1.86 m (6 ft 1 in)
- Position: Centre back

Youth career
- Universitatea Craiova

Senior career*
Years	Team	Apps	(Gls)
1978–1980	Universitatea Craiova	25	(0)
1980–1982	Dinamo București	36	(0)
1982–1984	Olt Scornicești	67	(0)
1984–1992	Steaua București	188	(4)
1992	Callatis Mangalia	11	(0)
1993–1995	Steaua Mizil	42	(3)
Total		369	(7)

International career
1986–1989	Romania	15	(1)

Managerial career
- 2005–2006: Concordia Chiajna
- 2009: Concordia Chiajna
- 2010: Concordia Chiajna
- 2010: FC FCSB II
- 2011-2012: CSO Bragadiru
- 2012-2013: Romania U16
- 2014-2015: FCSB (Youth Coach)
- * Club domestic league appearances and goals

Adrian Bumbescu (born 23 February 1960 in Craiova) is a retired Romanian footballer who played as a central defender.

A defender with a tough attitude, he played mostly with Steaua București, helping it win the 1986 European Cup and subsequent European Supercup.

He is widely regarded as one of the most successful players to have played in the Romanian First League. He ranks second in the all-time list of league championships won, alongside Giedrius Arlauskis, Ciprian Deac, Mircea Lucescu, Tudorel Stoica and Dumitru Stângaciu, with 7 titles each. Marius Lăcătuș won it 10 times and is ranked 1st.

== Club career ==
During his career as a player, Bumbescu won the Liga I with three clubs, in an unparalleled feat. His first appearances came during 1978–79 with hometown's FC Universitatea Craiova and, after winning the league in his second season, he signed with FC Dinamo București and conquered another championship in 1982.

After two years at FC Olt Scornicești, Bumbescu moved to national powerhouse FC Steaua București, where he won a further five leagues – being instrumental in four of those – and three domestic cups. He also played complete matches in two of the team's biggest achievements, the 1985–86 European Cup and the subsequent edition of the UEFA Super Cup, which was held the following year.

After 1991–92, Steaua refused to renew Bumbescu's contract. Aged 32, he joined Liga II side Steaua Mizil, where he played three more seasons before eventually retiring from professional football, having appeared in 316 first division games and scored four goals; he later rejoined Steaua as a youth coach.

On 25 March 2008, Bumbescu was decorated by the president of Romania Traian Băsescu with Ordinul "Meritul Sportiv" – ("The Sportive Merit" order) class II, for his part in the winning of the 1986 European Cup.

== International career ==
Bumbescu won 15 caps for Romania during slightly less than three years, scoring once. He did not take part in any major international tournament, however.

=== International goals ===
Scores and results list Romania's goal tally first. "Score" column indicates the score after the player's goal.

#	Date	Venue	Opponent	Score	Result	Competition
1	25 March 1987	Stadionul Ghencea, Bucharest, Romania	Albania	5–1	5–1	Euro 1988 qualifying

== Honours ==
Universitatea Craiova

- Divizia A: 1979–80

Dinamo București

- Divizia A: 1981–82
- Cupa României: 1981–82

Steaua București

- Divizia A: 1984–85, 1985–86, 1986–87, 1987–88, 1988–89
- Cupa României: 1984–85, 1986–87, 1987–88, 1991–92
- European Cup: 1985–86
- UEFA Super Cup: 1986
