= Ștefan Petcu =

Romanian footballer

Personal information
- Full name: Ştefan Petcu
- Date of birth: 17 March 1957 (age 69)
- Place of birth: Constanţa, Romania
- Position: Striker

Senior career*
Years	Team	Apps	(Gls)
1974–1983	FC Constanța	119	(21)
1983–1985	Steaua București	54	(11)
1985–1986	Bihor Oradea	5	(0)
1987–1989	FC Constanța	74	(30)
1989–1990	Unirea Slobozia	30	(10)
1990–1991	FC Constanța	19	(3)
1991–1992	Portul Constanţa	25	(6)
Total		326	(81)

International career
1976	Romania U21	3	(0)
1982	Romania Olympic	1	(0)
1982	Romania B	2	(0)

Managerial career
- 2013–2014: Farul Constanța
- * Club domestic league appearances and goals

Ștefan Petcu (born 17 March 1957) is a Romanian retired footballer, who most notably played for Farul Constanţa and Steaua București. On 25 March 2008 he was decorated by the president of Romania, Traian Băsescu with Ordinul "Meritul Sportiv" — (The Order "The Sportive Merit") class II for his part in winning the 1986 European Cup Final.

== Honours ==
Steaua București

- Divizia A: 1984–85, 1985–86
- Cupa României: 1984–85

FC Constanța

- Divizia B: 1980–81, 1987–88
