= 1985–86 Divizia A =

68th season of top-tier football league in Romania

Divizia A
- Season: 1985–86
- Champions: Steaua București
- Relegated: Politehnica Timişoara; ASA Târgu Mureș; Bihor Oradea
- European Cup: Steaua București
- Cup Winners' Cup: Dinamo București
- UEFA Cup: Sportul Studențesc; Universitatea Craiova
- Matches: 306
- Goals: 872 (2.85 per match)
- Top goalscorer: Gheorghe Hagi (31)
- Biggest home win: Corvinul 9–0 Rapid
- Biggest away win: Dinamo 0–5 Sportul
- Highest scoring: Sportul 7–5 Scornicești
- Longest winning run: Steaua (8)
- Longest unbeaten run: Steaua (17)
- Longest winless run: Poli Timișoara (12)
- Longest losing run: Poli Timișoara, Rapid (6)

The 1985–86 Divizia A was the sixty-eighth season of Divizia A, the top-level football league of Romania.

== Teams ==
Location of teams in 1985-86 Divizia A

== League table ==
Pos	Team	Pld	W	D	L	GF	GA	GD	Pts	Qualification or relegation
1	Steaua București (C)	34	26	5	3	79	25	+54	57	Qualification to European Cup first round
2	Sportul Studenţesc București	34	19	10	5	87	41	+46	48	Qualification to UEFA Cup first round
3	Universitatea Craiova	34	20	6	8	65	36	+29	46	Qualification to UEFA Cup first round
4	Dinamo București	34	20	6	8	49	27	+22	46	Qualification to Cup Winners' Cup first round
5	Corvinul Hunedoara	34	17	3	14	84	50	+34	37	
6	Argeș Pitești	34	14	8	12	39	41	−2	36	
7	Universitatea Cluj	34	14	5	15	51	52	−1	33	
8	Rapid București	34	14	5	15	41	56	−15	33	
9	Petrolul Ploiești	34	11	9	14	34	41	−7	31	
10	SC Bacău	34	14	2	18	45	50	−5	30	
11	FCM Brașov	34	11	8	15	35	58	−23	30	
12	Victoria București	34	9	11	14	36	47	−11	29	
13	Olt Scornicești	34	11	7	16	42	57	−15	29	
14	Chimia Râmnicu Vâlcea	34	12	5	17	36	53	−17	29	
15	Gloria Buzău	34	10	8	16	45	61	−16	28	
16	Politehnica Timișoara (R)	34	11	5	18	48	56	−8	27	Relegation to Divizia B
17	ASA Târgu Mureș (R)	34	10	6	18	30	50	−20	26	Relegation to Divizia B
18	Bihor Oradea (R)	34	5	7	22	26	71	−45	17	Relegation to Divizia B

Source: LT
Rules for classification: 1) points; 2) goal difference; 3) number of goals scored
(C) Champions; (R) Relegated

=== Results ===
Home \ Away	ASA	ARG	BAC	BHO	BRA	COR	UCR	DIN	GBU	OLT	PET	RAP	RAM	SPO	STE	POL	UCL	VIB
ASA Târgu Mureș	—	0–1	2–0	1–0	0–0	2–1	0–1	0–1	2–0	2–0	0–0	2–0	3–0	1–4	1–2	2–1	0–0	3–1
Argeș Pitești	1–0	—	4–3	0–0	1–1	1–1	2–1	0–1	3–1	0–0	2–1	0–0	2–1	3–3	0–2	4–3	2–0	0–0
Bacău	3–0	2–0	—	4–0	3–0	1–0	2–2	0–1	2–0	3–0	3–0	4–2	3–0	1–0	0–2	0–0	2–1	1–0
Bihor Oradea	1–2	0–2	1–0	—	2–0	2–2	0–2	0–2	1–2	3–0	1–1	1–1	4–0	1–2	0–0	0–0	2–1	0–0
Brașov	1–0	1–0	3–1	5–0	—	3–0	1–1	1–0	2–1	2–1	0–0	2–1	1–3	1–4	2–2	2–2	1–0	1–0
Corvinul Hunedoara	5–0	3–0	3–0	5–1	4–0	—	3–0	2–1	5–1	6–0	5–0	9–0	3–1	4–3	3–1	4–0	4–3	3–1
Universitatea Craiova	2–0	3–1	3–1	1–0	3–0	4–1	—	0–0	7–0	1–2	1–0	7–0	1–0	2–1	5–4	5–0	1–0	2–1
Dinamo București	1–1	0–2	3–1	5–1	4–0	0–0	4–0	—	2–0	2–0	1–0	2–1	3–0	0–5	2–1	2–1	1–0	3–2
Gloria Buzău	1–1	3–2	3–0	2–0	2–2	3–1	1–0	1–3	—	0–0	2–2	4–2	3–0	2–2	0–1	3–0	3–0	0–0
Olt Scornicești	2–1	0–1	2–1	2–1	0–0	3–2	1–1	0–1	2–0	—	0–0	3–0	3–0	2–2	0–1	1–2	4–2	2–1
Petrolul Ploiești	2–0	3–1	2–1	2–0	2–0	4–1	1–2	0–0	3–1	1–0	—	2–0	0–0	0–0	0–2	1–0	2–0	1–1
Rapid București	2–0	1–0	4–0	4–0	2–1	1–0	0–1	1–0	0–0	4–3	2–0	—	1–0	3–1	1–2	1–0	1–0	0–0
Chimia Râmnicu Vâlcea	3–1	1–0	0–1	2–1	2–0	1–0	2–0	2–2	0–0	2–2	2–1	0–0	—	0–2	0–4	4–1	4–1	2–0
Sportul Studenţesc București	4–0	0–0	1–0	5–0	5–1	5–1	1–1	2–1	3–2	7–5	3–1	1–0	3–0	—	1–2	2–2	6–1	4–0
Steaua București	4–1	1–0	2–1	5–0	6–0	1–0	2–0	1–0	4–1	3–0	6–1	3–1	1–0	1–1	—	4–2	2–0	4–0
Politehnica Timișoara	3–0	1–2	5–0	2–0	2–0	3–2	1–2	2–0	4–1	1–2	1–0	1–3	1–0	0–1	0–1	—	1–2	1–1
Universitatea Cluj	2–2	4–0	2–1	5–1	1–0	3–1	3–2	0–1	4–2	2–0	1–0	3–1	3–0	1–1	2–2	2–1	—	1–0
Victoria București	1–0	0–2	2–0	4–2	3–1	1–0	1–1	0–0	1–0	2–0	2–1	4–1	2–4	2–0	0–0	2–4	1–1	—

Source: LT (in Romanian)
Legend: Blue = home team win; Yellow = draw; Red = away team win.

== Top goalscorers ==
Position	Player	Club	Goals
1	Gheorghe Hagi	Sportul Studenţesc	31
2	Victor Piţurcă	Steaua București	29
3	Marian Bâcu	Universitatea Craiova	25
4	Ioan Petcu	Corvinul Hunedoara	20
5	Dorin Mateuț	Corvinul Hunedoara	16
5	Mircea Sandu	Sportul Studenţesc București	16

== Champion squad ==
Steaua București

Goalkeepers: Helmut Duckadam (32 / 0); Dumitru Stângaciu (7 / 0).
Defenders: Ștefan Iovan (29 / 7); Adrian Bumbescu (33 / 0); Miodrag Belodedici (32 / 2); Ilie Bărbulescu (33 / 2); Anton Weissenbacher (14 / 1); Dan Petrescu (2 / 0); Virgil Petcu (1 / 0); Leontin Stanciu (1 / 0).
Midfielders: Lucian Bălan (28 / 2); Tudorel Stoica (31 / 5); László Bölöni (31 / 9); Ștefan Petcu (4 / 1); Mihail Majearu (33 / 7); Gabi Balint (31 / 3); Constantin Pistol (4 / 0); Marius Răzvan Goran (1 / 0); Marian Alexandru (1 / 0); Gheorghe Ceaușilă (1 / 0).
Forwards: Marius Lăcătuș (31 / 7); Victor Pițurcă (34 / 29); Marin Radu (21 / 4).
(league appearances and goals listed in brackets)

Manager: Emerich Jenei.

== Attendances ==
No.	Club	Average
1	Craiova	22,647
2	Steaua	20,882
3	Timişoara	17,882
4	Gloria	15,882
5	U Cluj	15,706
6	Petrolul	14,588
7	FC Rapid	12,529
8	Dinamo 1948	12,412
9	Braşov	11,588
10	Bacău	11,118
11	Hunedoara	10,412
12	Argeş	10,235
13	Rāmnicu Vālcea	9,588
14	Sportul Studenţesc	7,824
15	Bihor	7,000
16	Tīrgu Mureş	6,441
17	Victoria Bucureşti	6,176
18	Olt Scorniceşti	6,000

== See also ==
- 1985–86 Divizia B
- 1985–86 Divizia C
- 1985–86 County Championship
- 1985–86 Cupa României
