= 1986 European Super Cup =

Steaua București	Dynamo Kyiv
(Romania)	(Soviet Union)
1	0
- Date: 24 February 1987
- Venue: Stade Louis II, Monaco
- Referee: Luigi Agnolin (Italy)
- Attendance: 8,456

The 1986 European Super Cup was played as a single match between Steaua București, winners of the 1985–86 European Cup, and Dynamo Kyiv, winners of the 1985–86 European Cup Winners' Cup, with Steaua winning 1–0. The winning goal was scored by Gheorghe Hagi.

== Match ==
=== Details ===
24 February 1987
20:15

Steaua București (Romania)	1–0	(Soviet Union) Dynamo Kyiv
Hagi 44'	Report

Stade Louis II, Monaco
Attendance: 8,456
Referee: Luigi Agnolin (Italy)

Steaua București	Dynamo Kyiv

GK	1	(Romania) Dumitru Stângaciu
RB	2	(Romania) Ștefan Iovan
CB	4	(Romania) Adrian Bumbescu
CB	6	(Romania) Miodrag Belodedici
LB	3	(Romania) Ilie Bărbulescu
CB	8	(Romania) Lucian Bălan
RM	5	(Romania) Tudorel Stoica (c)
CM	11	(Romania) László Bölöni
CM	10	(Romania) Gheorghe Hagi	(substituted off) 84'
FW	7	(Romania) Marius Lăcătuș	(substituted off) 89'
FW	9	(Romania) Victor Pițurcă
Substitutes:
DF	14	(Romania) Mihail Majearu	(substituted on) 89'
FW	16	(Romania) Gabi Balint	(substituted on) 84'
Manager:
(Romania) Anghel Iordănescu

GK	1	(Soviet Union) Viktor Chanov
DF	8	(Soviet Union) Andriy Bal
DF	5	(Soviet Union) Anatoliy Demyanenko (c)
DF	4	(Soviet Union) Oleh Kuznetsov
DF	3	(Soviet Union) Sergei Baltacha
MF	6	(Soviet Union) Vasyl Rats
MF	7	(Soviet Union) Pavlo Yakovenko
MF	10	(Soviet Union) Vadym Yevtushenko
MF	9	(Soviet Union) Oleksandr Zavarov	(substituted off) 77'
FW	2	(Soviet Union) Igor Belanov	(substituted off) 50'
FW	11	(Soviet Union) Oleg Blokhin
Substitutes:
MF	17	(Soviet Union) Oleksiy Mykhaylychenko	(substituted on) 50'
MF	16	(Soviet Union) Oleg Morozov	(substituted on) 77'
Manager:
(Soviet Union) Valeriy Lobanovskyi

== See also ==
- 1986–87 European Cup
- 1986–87 European Cup Winners' Cup
- FC Dynamo Kyiv in European football
- Steaua București in European football
