= Ștefan Iovan =

Romanian footballer

Ştefan Iovan
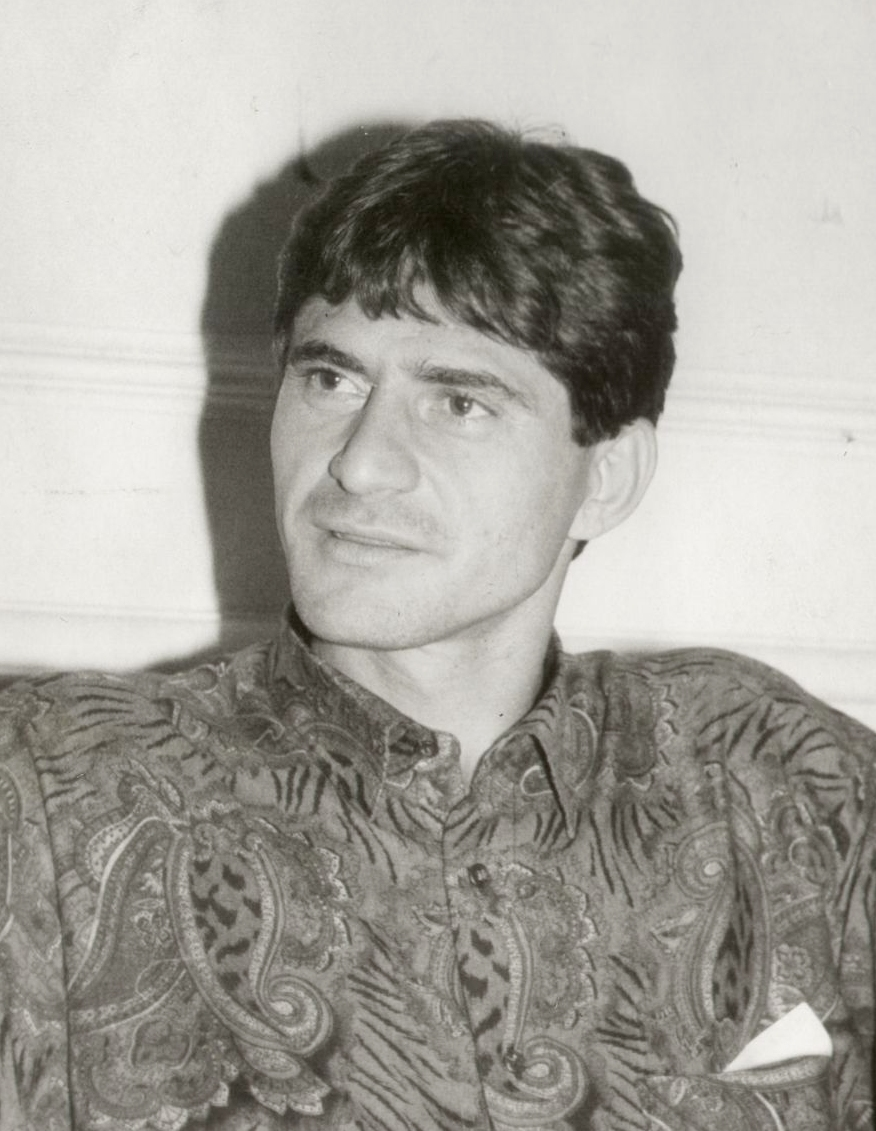
- Iovan pictured in the 1980s

Personal information
- Date of birth: 23 August 1960 (age 66)
- Place of birth: Moțăței, Romania
- Height: 1.85 m (6 ft 1 in)
- Position: Defender

Team information
- Current team: CSA Steaua București (head of youth development)

Youth career
- 1975–1976: Gloria Reșița
- 1976–1977: FCM Reşiţa
- 1978–1979: → Luceafărul București (loan)

Senior career*
Years	Team	Apps	(Gls)
1975–1976	Gloria Reșița		
1977–1980	FCM Reşiţa	46	(7)
1981–1991	Steaua București	285	(18)
1991–1992	Brighton & Hove Albion	6	(0)
1992	Steaua București	6	(0)
1993–1995	Rapid București	67	(2)
1995–1996	Electroputere Craiova	8	(0)
1996–1997	CSM Reşiţa	13	(0)
Total		431	(27)

International career
1979–1982	Romania U21	12	(0)
1983–1990	Romania	34	(3)

Managerial career
- 2000–2002: Steaua București (assistant)
- 2002: Steaua București (caretaker)
- 2002–2004: Steaua București (assistant)
- 2004–2011: Romania (assistant)
- 2011: Romania (caretaker)
- 2013–2014: Romania U19
- 2014–2015: Viitorul Constanța (assistant)
- 2015–2016: Al-Ittihad (assistant)
- 2017–2019: CSA Steaua București (assistant)
- 2020–: CSA Steaua București (head of youth development)
- * Club domestic league appearances and goals

Ştefan Iovan (born 23 August 1960) is a Romanian former professional footballer who played as a defender, currently head of youth development at Liga II club CSA Steaua București.

== Club career ==
Iovan made his debut in Divizia A at FCM Reşiţa in 1977, before joining the squad of Luceafărul București one year later. Luceafărul was then a team formed by the Romanian Football Federation to gather the young talents of Romanian football and did not play in any league. Iovan returned to Reşiţa in 1979, but in the winter of 1981 joined Steaua București where he played for ten years, until 1991.

In 1991 he joined the English club Brighton & Hove Albion, but returned to Steaua București in 1992 for half a season only before signing with Rapid București, then Electroputere Craiova in 1995. His last season as a professional football player was 1996–97 with CSM Reşiţa.

Iovan played a total of 359 games in Divizia A and scored 20 goals. He was champion of Divizia A on five occasions and also won the Romanian Cup three times, all with Steaua Bucharest.

He was the team captain of Steaua when they won the 1986 European Cup and the UEFA Super Cup.

On 25 March 2008 he was decorated by the president of Romania, Traian Băsescu with Ordinul "Meritul Sportiv" — (The Order "The Sportive Merit") class II for his part in winning the 1986 European Cup Final.

== International career ==
At the international level, he played for Romania in 34 games and scored three goals. He also played 12 times for the Romanian Under 21 side.

== Coaching career ==
After retiring from football he was assistant coach at Steaua București and Romania national team.

== Playing statistics ==
Appearances and goals by national team and year
National team	Year	Apps	Goals
Romania	1983	3	0
Romania	1984	1	0
Romania	1985	7	1
Romania	1986	4	2
Romania	1987	5	0
Romania	1988	4	0
Romania	1989	7	0
Romania	1990	3	0
Total		34	3

Scores and results list Romania's goal tally first, score column indicates score after each Iovan goal.

List of international goals scored by Ștefan Iovan
No.	Date	Venue	Opponent	Score	Result	Competition
1	13 November 1985	İzmir Atatürk Stadyumu, İzmir, Turkey	Turkey	3–0	3–1	1986 World Cup qualifiers
2	10 September 1986	Stadionul Steaua, Bucharest, Romania	Austria	1–0	4–0	Euro 1988 qualifying
3	10 September 1986	Stadionul Steaua, Bucharest, Romania	Austria	3–0	4–0	Euro 1988 qualifying

== Honours ==
Steaua București

- Divizia A: 1984–85, 1985–86, 1986–87, 1987–88, 1988–89
- Cupa României: 1984–85, 1986–87, 1988–89
- European Cup: 1985–86
- UEFA Super Cup: 1986
- Intercontinental Cup runner-up: 1986

Rapid București

- Cupa României runner-up: 1994–95

CSM Reșița

- Divizia B: 1996–97
