= Iosif Rotariu =

Romanian footballer (born 1962)

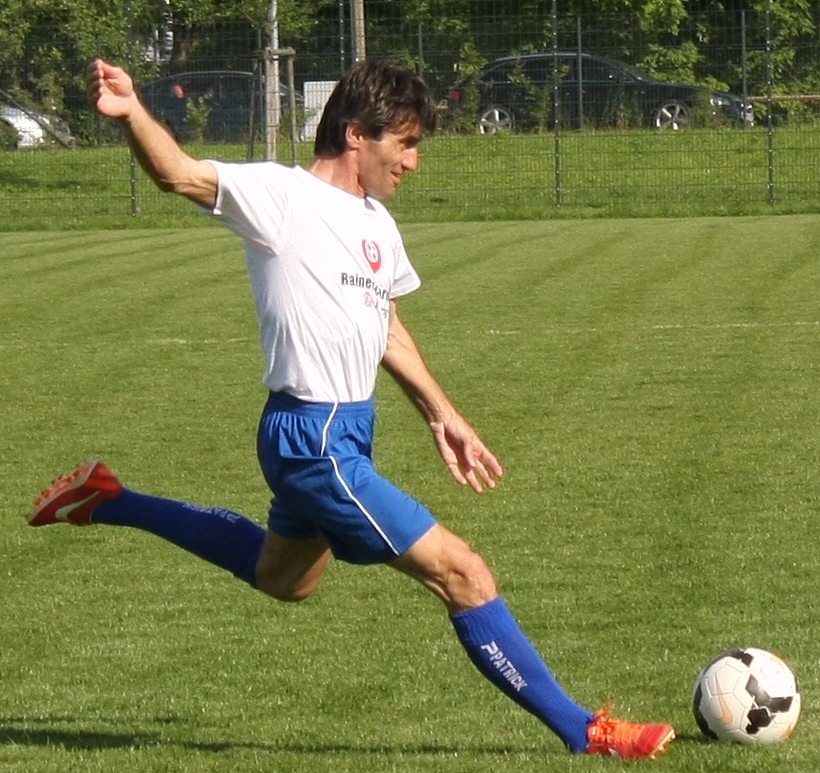
- Rotariu in 2014

Personal information
- Date of birth: 27 September 1962 (age 64)
- Place of birth: Prigor, Romania
- Height: 1.80 m (5 ft 11 in)
- Position: Midfielder

Team information
- Current team: Politehnica Timișoara (board member)

Youth career
- 1976–1979: Nera Bozovici
- 1979–1981: Politehnica Timișoara

Senior career*
Years	Team	Apps	(Gls)
1981–1986	Politehnica Timișoara	106	(16)
1986–1990	Steaua București	93	(28)
1990–1992	Galatasaray	28	(4)
1993–1994	Bakırköyspor	34	(7)
1994–1995	CFR Timișoara	9	(2)
1995	Politehnica Timișoara	17	(6)
1996	Kikinda	10	(4)
1996	Politehnica Timișoara	17	(6)
1997–1998	Steaua București	42	(11)
1998	Politehnica Timișoara	21	(4)
1999	Extensiv Craiova	27	(2)
2000–2001	Politehnica Timișoara	12	(1)
2001–2002	Bihor Oradea	17	(2)
2012–2013	ASU Politehnica Timișoara	10	(3)
Total		443	(96)

International career
1988–1997	Romania	25	(1)

Managerial career
- 2006: Politehnica Timișoara (caretaker)
- 2006–2009: Politehnica II Timișoara
- 2007: Politehnica Timișoara (caretaker)
- 2009–2012: Politehnica Timișoara (assistant)
- 2012: Bihor Oradea
- 2013: Vaslui (assistant)
- 2014: FC Caransebeș
- 2015–2016: ACS Poli Timișoara (assistant)
- 2016: Universitatea Craiova (academy manager)
- 2023–2024: Politehnica Timișoara (chief scout)
- 2024: Gloria Bistrița-Năsăud
- 2026–: Politehnica Timișoara (board member)
- * Club domestic league appearances and goals

Iosif Rotariu (born 27 September 1962) is a Romanian former professional footballer who played as a midfielder. He is currently board member at Liga III club Politehnica Timișoara.

He debuted in Divizia A with Politehnica Timișoara in 1981. He won the league championship with Steaua București in 1987, 1988, 1989, 1997 and 1998, and won the Romanian Cup with the same club in 1987, 1988, 1989 and 1997. He also played abroad, in Turkey and Serbia.

Rotariu made his debut for the Romania national team in 1988 against Netherlands, and represented his country at the 1990 FIFA World Cup. He got 25 caps in total, the last in 1997, and scored one international goal, against Poland in 1990.

== Personal life ==
Rotariu's identical twin brother Ilie and his nephew Dorin also played professional football, but only Dorin managed to represent Romania at International level.

== Career statistics ==
Appearances and goals by national team and year
National team	Year	Apps	Goals
Romania	1988	5	0
Romania	1989	5	0
Romania	1990	13	1
Romania	1991	0	0
Romania	1992	1	0
Romania	1997	1	0
Total		25	1

Scores and results list Romania's goal tally first, score column indicates score after each Rotariu goal.

#	Date	Venue	Opponent	Score	Result	Competition
1	26 September 1990	Stadionul Steaua, Bucharest, Romania	Poland	2–0	2–1	Friendly

== Honours ==
=== Player ===
Politehnica Timișoara

- Divizia B: 1983–84
- Cupa României runner-up: 1980–81, 1982–83

Steaua București

- Divizia A: 1986–87, 1987–88, 1988–89, 1996–97, 1997–98
- Cupa României: 1986–87, 1987–88, 1988–89, 1996–97
- European Cup runner-up: 1988–89
- European Super Cup: 1986
- Intercontinental Cup runner-up: 1986

Galatasaray

- Turkish Cup: 1990–91
- Turkish Super Cup: 1991

Extensiv Craiova

- Divizia B: 1998–99

=== Coach ===
FC Caransebeș

- Liga III: 2013–14
