= Ioan Kramer =

Romanian footballer

Personal information
- Date of birth: 11 March 1962 (age 64)
- Place of birth: Sighișoara, Romania
- Position: Striker

Senior career*
Years	Team	Apps	(Gls)
1981–1986	FCM Brașov	131	(45)
1987–1988	Steaua București	8	(2)
1989	Blau-Weiß 1890 Berlin	6	(0)
Total		145	(47)

International career
1987	Romania	1	(1)
- * Club domestic league appearances and goals

Ioan Kramer (born 11 March 1962) is a Romanian former football striker.

== International career ==
Ioan Kramer played one friendly match at international level for Romania, in which he scored the decisive goal of the 3–2 victory against Israel.

== Honours ==
FCM Brașov

- Divizia B: 1983–84
