= Gheorghe Ceaușilă =

Romanian footballer

Personal information
- Date of birth: 11 October 1966 (age 60)
- Place of birth: Boișoara, Romania
- Height: 1.83 m (6 ft 0 in)
- Position: Striker

Senior career*
Years	Team	Apps	(Gls)
1984–1985	Chimia Râmnicu Vâlcea	2	(0)
1985	Steaua București	1	(0)
1986–1997	Chimia Râmnicu Vâlcea	31	(5)
1987–1988	Olt Scornicești	32	(1)
1989–1991	Universitatea Craiova	45	(7)
1991–1992	Dacia Unirea Brăila	18	(3)
1992–1993	Sportul Studențesc	42	(25)
1994	PAOK	8	(1)
1994	Dinamo București	10	(6)
1995	Naţional București	9	(1)
1995	Sportul Studențesc	3	(0)
1995–1996	Farul Constanța	21	(3)
1996	Hapoel Tayibe	2	(0)
1997	Apulum Alba Iulia	11	(6)
1998–1999	Juventus București		
Total		235	(58)

International career
1993	Romania	5	(0)
- * Club domestic league appearances and goals

Gheorghe Ceaușilă (born 11 October 1966) is a retired Romanian striker.

== Honours ==
Steaua București

- Liga I: 1985–86

Universitatea Craiova

- Liga I: 1990–91
- Cupa României: 1990–91
