= Niță Cireașă =

Romanian footballer (born 1965)

Personal information
- Date of birth: 21 January 1965 (age 61)
- Place of birth: Brăila, Romania
- Position: Midfielder

Senior career*
Years	Team	Apps	(Gls)
1982–1985	Progresul Brăila		
1985–1986	Chimia Râmnicu Vâlcea	31	(1)
1986–1990	Steaua București	45	(5)
1989	→ Olt Scornicești (loan)	30	(1)
1990–1994	Verbroedering Geel	42	(1)
1994–1997	Rapid Leest		
Total		148	(8)

International career
1986	Romania	1	(0)
- * Club domestic league appearances and goals

Niță Mircea Cireașă (born 21 January 1965) is a Romanian former footballer who played as a midfielder.

== International career ==
Niță Cireașă played one friendly game at international level for Romania, when coach Mircea Lucescu sent him on the field in order to replace Ioan Andone in the 75th minute of a 3–0 loss against Scotland.

== Honours ==
Steaua București

- Divizia A: 1986–87, 1987–88, 1988–89
- Cupa României: 1986–87, 1988–89
