= 1987–88 Divizia A =

70th season of top-tier football league in Romania

Divizia A
- Season: 1987–88
- Champions: Steaua București
- Relegated: Politehnica Timişoara; Petrolul Ploieşti; CSM Suceava
- European Cup: Steaua București
- Cup Winners' Cup: Dinamo București
- UEFA Cup: Victoria București; Oţelul Galaţi
- Matches: 306
- Goals: 909 (2.97 per match)
- Top goalscorer: Victor Pițurcă (34)
- Biggest home win: Dinamo 9–1 Suceava
- Biggest away win: Petrolul 0–4 Steaua; Rapid 0–4 Steaua; Victoria 0–4 Steaua
- Highest scoring: Dinamo 9–1 Suceava; Dinamo 8–2 Corvinul; Universitatea 4–6 Steaua
- Longest winning run: Steaua, Dinamo (13)
- Longest unbeaten run: Steaua (34)
- Longest losing run: Politehnica (6)

The 1987–88 Divizia A was the seventieth season of Divizia A, the top-level football league of Romania.

== Teams ==
Location of teams in 1987-88 Divizia A

== League table ==
Pos	Team	Pld	W	D	L	GF	GA	GD	Pts	Qualification or relegation
1	Steaua București (C)	34	30	4	0	114	18	+96	64	Qualification to European Cup first round
2	Dinamo București	34	30	3	1	107	25	+82	63	Qualification to Cup Winners' Cup first round
3	Victoria București	34	18	4	12	58	41	+17	40	Qualification to UEFA Cup first round
4	Oțelul Galați	34	18	3	13	49	46	+3	39	Qualification to UEFA Cup first round
5	Universitatea Craiova	34	16	4	14	61	51	+10	36	Invitation to Balkans Cup
6	Flacăra Moreni	34	13	7	14	40	48	−8	33	
7	Corvinul Hunedoara	34	13	4	17	54	63	−9	30	
8	FCM Brașov	34	11	7	16	47	51	−4	29	
9	Argeș Pitești	34	11	7	16	41	47	−6	29	
10	Universitatea Cluj	34	11	7	16	39	54	−15	29	
11	ASA Târgu Mureș	34	13	3	18	49	66	−17	29	
12	SC Bacău	34	10	9	15	37	54	−17	29	
13	Rapid București	34	10	9	15	36	58	−22	29	
14	Sportul Studenţesc București	34	10	8	16	43	50	−7	28	
15	Olt Scornicești	34	12	4	18	38	63	−25	28	
16	Politehnica Timișoara (R)	34	10	6	18	35	53	−18	26	Relegation to Divizia B
17	Petrolul Ploiești (R)	34	10	6	18	25	52	−27	26	Relegation to Divizia B
18	CSM Suceava (R)	34	10	5	19	36	69	−33	25	Relegation to Divizia B

Source: LT
Rules for classification: 1) points; 2) goal difference; 3) number of goals scored
(C) Champions; (R) Relegated

=== Positions by round ===
Team ╲ Round	1	2	3	4	5	6	7	8	9	10	11	12	13	14	15	16	17	18	19	20	21	22	23	24	25	26	27	28	29	30	31	32	33	34
ASA Târgu Mureș	13	17	13	12	15	11	13	11	12	13	14	13	13	13	11	9	11	12	10	9	9	8	8	9	11	9	11	8	10	8	10	9	10	11
Argeș Pitești	5	3	4	3	6	7	9	8	10	8	7	8	7	9	10	11	12	11	12	12	12	16	17	17	18	16	16	15	15	14	15	13	9	9
Bacău	7	14	14	17	18	18	17	17	17	15	16	15	15	14	13	14	16	15	15	16	15	11	14	11	13	11	13	12	14	12	14	11	11	12
Brașov	15	18	17	16	17	15	16	13	14	12	12	12	11	12	14	12	10	9	9	8	8	10	10	8	9	8	9	10	9	10	9	8	8	8
Suceava	3	4	5	7	11	13	12	14	16	17	17	16	18	16	18	16	15	16	16	17	16	17	15	16	17	17	18	17	18	18	18	18	18	18
Corvinul Hunedoara	17	11	8	9	5	6	5	6	5	6	4	6	4	6	6	6	6	6	6	7	7	7	7	7	7	7	6	7	6	7	6	6	7	7
Universitatea Craiova	4	8	7	4	3	3	3	3	4	5	5	7	9	7	7	7	7	7	7	6	6	6	6	5	5	5	5	5	5	5	5	5	5	5
Dinamo București	1	1	2	2	2	2	2	1	1	1	2	2	2	2	2	2	2	2	2	2	2	2	2	2	2	2	2	2	2	2	2	2	2	2
Flacăra Moreni	8	5	6	8	8	4	8	7	9	9	8	5	8	5	4	5	5	5	5	5	5	5	5	6	6	6	7	6	7	6	7	7	6	6
Olt Scornicești	14	7	12	10	12	10	7	9	7	7	11	11	10	11	8	10	9	8	8	10	10	9	9	10	8	10	8	9	8	9	8	10	12	15
Oțelul Galați	9	12	18	13	9	8	6	5	3	4	3	4	3	4	3	4	4	4	4	4	4	4	4	4	4	3	3	4	4	4	4	4	4	4
Petrolul Ploiești	18	9	9	11	13	14	15	16	15	16	15	17	14	17	17	18	18	18	18	18	18	18	18	18	16	18	17	18	17	17	17	17	17	17
Rapid București	11	16	16	15	14	16	14	15	13	14	13	14	16	18	16	17	17	17	17	15	14	13	13	13	12	13	12	13	11	13	11	12	15	13
Sportul Studențesc București	16	15	15	18	16	17	18	18	18	18	18	18	17	15	15	15	13	13	14	14	17	15	16	15	15	14	15	14	12	15	12	15	13	14
Steaua București	2	2	1	1	1	1	1	2	2	2	1	1	1	1	1	1	1	1	1	1	1	1	1	1	1	1	1	1	1	1	1	1	1	1
Politehnica Timișoara	10	13	11	14	10	12	11	10	8	10	9	9	6	8	9	8	8	10	11	11	11	14	12	14	14	15	14	16	16	16	16	14	16	16
Universitatea Cluj	6	10	10	6	7	9	10	12	11	11	10	10	12	10	12	13	14	14	13	13	13	12	11	12	10	12	10	11	13	11	13	16	14	10
Victoria București	12	6	3	5	4	5	4	4	6	3	6	3	5	3	5	3	3	3	3	3	3	3	3	3	3	4	4	3	3	3	3	3	3	3

Source: LT (in Romanian)

=== Results ===
Home \ Away	ASA	ARG	BAC	BRA	CSV	COR	UCR	DIN	FLA	OLT	OȚE	PET	RAP	SPO	STE	POL	UCL	VIB
ASA Târgu Mureș	—	1–2	1–0	1–1	3–1	2–1	2–1	0–2	2–2	2–1	2–1	4–0	4–1	2–0	0–4	1–0	2–1	2–0
Argeș Pitești	3–2	—	4–2	3–1	2–1	4–0	0–1	0–3	3–1	1–0	2–0	0–0	1–1	1–2	0–0	3–0	1–1	0–1
Bacău	2–1	3–1	—	0–1	1–0	2–0	0–0	1–2	2–2	5–3	4–0	3–2	1–0	1–1	0–0	3–1	1–0	0–1
Brașov	1–2	1–1	1–1	—	3–0	1–1	4–0	0–2	3–2	7–0	1–0	2–1	1–1	2–0	0–2	2–0	3–2	3–2
Suceava	1–0	2–1	0–0	3–1	—	3–1	0–1	1–3	0–0	2–0	1–2	3–0	2–0	2–1	1–3	2–2	3–1	0–2
Corvinul Hunedoara	4–0	2–0	4–2	2–0	5–0	—	4–0	2–3	1–0	1–1	3–0	5–2	1–1	2–1	0–1	2–1	0–1	2–2
Universitatea Craiova	5–1	1–0	2–0	4–1	2–0	6–0	—	1–3	2–0	6–0	2–1	2–0	4–2	3–1	4–6	2–0	0–0	1–3
Dinamo București	2–1	4–0	3–1	5–1	9–1	8–2	3–1	—	2–0	6–0	3–1	5–0	5–2	2–1	0–0	6–0	4–0	2–0
Flacăra Moreni	2–0	1–0	1–0	2–1	1–0	1–0	2–0	0–1	—	1–1	0–1	2–0	3–0	3–2	1–4	2–0	2–2	2–1
Olt Scornicești	3–2	0–2	2–0	1–0	0–3	3–1	3–2	0–0	2–0	—	3–0	3–2	2–0	4–0	0–4	2–0	1–0	0–0
Oțelul Galați	3–0	1–1	1–1	1–0	5–1	2–1	4–2	0–3	2–0	1–0	—	2–0	1–0	3–1	1–2	1–0	4–1	3–1
Petrolul Ploiești	1–0	1–0	0–0	0–0	0–0	1–0	3–2	0–2	0–1	1–0	1–2	—	0–0	1–0	0–4	1–1	3–0	1–0
Rapid București	4–3	2–1	1–0	2–1	2–0	2–1	1–1	0–1	2–2	1–0	1–1	0–1	—	1–1	0–4	1–0	2–0	1–0
Sportul Studențesc București	6–1	2–1	4–0	1–0	2–2	3–0	1–1	1–2	2–0	3–1	0–2	3–1	1–1	—	0–3	1–1	0–1	1–0
Steaua București	4–1	2–0	8–0	3–1	5–0	4–0	3–0	3–3	5–0	5–0	3–0	2–0	5–0	3–0	—	4–1	5–0	4–0
Politehnica Timișoara	1–1	3–0	5–0	1–0	2–1	1–2	2–1	2–1	3–1	1–0	0–1	0–1	4–3	0–0	0–2	—	1–0	1–1
Universitatea Cluj	4–0	3–1	0–0	1–1	6–0	1–2	1–0	1–4	2–2	1–0	2–1	1–0	3–1	1–1	0–3	2–1	—	0–2
Victoria București	2–1	2–2	2–0	4–2	3–0	4–2	0–1	2–3	2–1	3–0	4–1	3–1	3–0	2–0	0–4	3–0	3–0	—

Source: LT (in Romanian)
Legend: Blue = home team win; Yellow = draw; Red = away team win.

== Top goalscorers ==
Position	Player	Club	Goals
1	Victor Pițurcă	Steaua București	34
2	Claudiu Vaişcovici	Victoria București / Dinamo București	27
3	Gheorghe Hagi	Steaua București	25
4	Rodion Cămătaru	Dinamo București	17
4	Dorin Mateuț	Dinamo București	17

== Champion squad ==
Steaua București

Goalkeepers: Dumitru Stângaciu (12 / 0); Gheorghe Liliac (22 / 0).
Defenders: Ștefan Iovan (30 / 2); Adrian Bumbescu (28 / 2); Miodrag Belodedici (31 / 3); Nicolae Ungureanu (24 / 4); Dan Petrescu (11 / 1); Iosif Rotariu (29 / 6); Adrian Lucaci (2 / 0); Niță Cireașă (13 / 0).
Midfielders: Lucian Bălan (24 / 1); László Bölöni (14 / 2); Mihail Majearu (24 / 4); Tudorel Stoica (30 / 4); Gheorghe Popescu (13 / 0).
Forwards: Gabi Balint (24 / 10); Gheorghe Hagi (31 / 25); Marius Lăcătuș (30 / 9); Victor Pițurcă (33 / 34); Sorin Ion Mihai (1 / 0); Ilie Stan (2 / 0); Ion Constantin Cojocar (8 / 0).
(league appearances and goals listed in brackets)

Manager: Anghel Iordănescu.

== Attendances ==
No.	Club	Average
1	Timişoara	21,412
2	Steaua	19,353
3	Oţelul	18,588
4	Craiova	16,118
5	FC Rapid	14,294
6	Argeş	12,647
7	U Cluj	12,353
8	Cetatea	11,824
9	Petrolul	11,059
10	Dinamo 1948	10,882
11	Bacău	10,735
12	Braşov	10,206
13	Tîrgu Mureş	8,059
14	Hunedoara	7,088
15	Sportul Studenţesc	6,882
16	Flacăra	6,735
17	Olt Scorniceşti	5,206
18	Victoria Bucureşti	4,176

== See also ==
- 1987–88 Divizia B
