= Marcel Pușcaș =

Romanian footballer

Personal information
- Date of birth: 12 October 1960 (age 66)
- Place of birth: Oradea, Romania
- Position: Midfielder

Youth career
- Bihor Oradea

Senior career*
Years	Team	Apps	(Gls)
1978–1983	Bihor Oradea	98	(25)
1983–1985	Steaua București	42	(7)
1985–1987	Rapid București	10	(3)
1988	CS Târgoviște		
1989	Steaua Mizil		
Total		150	(35)

International career
1983	Romania	1	(0)

Managerial career
- 1988: CS Târgoviște (player/coach)
- 1993: Rapid București (caretaker)
- 1996–1998: Steaua București (president)
- 2018–2024: FC U Craiova (general director)
- 2024–2025: Ceahlăul Piatra Neamț (president)
- * Club domestic league appearances and goals

Marcel Pușcaș (born 12 October 1960) is a Romanian former professional footballer who played as a midfielder.

== Club career ==
Pușcaș was born on 12 October 1960 in Oradea, Romania. He began playing football at local club Bihor, making his Divizia A debut on 3 December 1978 when coach Emerich Jenei sent him at halftime to replace Ioan Naom in a 1–0 home loss to Sportul Studențesc București. At the end of his first season, the team was relegated to Divizia B, but he stayed with the club, helping it get promoted back to the first league after two seasons.

In 1983 he joined Steaua București, where he won The Double in the 1984–85 season for which he contributed with two goals scored in the 21 league appearances given to him by coaches Florin Halagian and Jenei. In the same season he played in both legs of the 1–0 aggregate loss to A.S. Roma in the first round of the European Cup Winners' Cup. In 1985, Pușcaș left Steaua to play for Rapid București, where in a match against Politehnica Timișoara, he had his leg broken by Marcel Sabou, an injury that kept him off the field for about two years. After he recovered from the injury, Pușcaș played only a few matches for Rapid, including his last Divizia A appearance which took place on 18 October 1987 in a 3–2 win over ASA Târgu Mureș, totaling 85 matches with 13 goals in the competition.

Afterwards he went to second division club CS Târgoviște, where he was a player-coach. Pușcaș ended his playing career after the 1988–89 season at Divizia B club Steaua Mizil.

== International career ==
Pușcaș played one friendly game for Romania, being sent by coach Mircea Lucescu to replace Aurel Țicleanu in the 72nd minute of a 1–0 victory against East Germany.

== Managerial career ==
Pușcaș started coaching in 1988 at Divizia B club CS Târgoviște, where he was also an active player. In 1993 Pușcaș was coach at Rapid București, and managed to qualify the team in European competitions for the first time after 18 years. Subsequently, he led the team in the 5–1 aggregate defeat to Inter Milan in the 1993–94 UEFA Cup.

== After retirement ==
After abandoning his coaching career, Pușcaș worked as a football official at AJF Bihor, after which he became president at Viitorul Oradea. From 1996 until 1998 he was president at Steaua București, a period in which the club won two league titles, one Cupa României and one Supercupa României. Between 2002 and 2004 he worked as a sports agent. In March 2014 Pușcaș ran for president of the Romanian Football Federation, but gave up his candidacy during the General Assembly of the elections in order to support Răzvan Burleanu who eventually won the elections. Afterwards, Pușcaș was co-opted into Burleanu's administrative team at the federation. In April 2018, Pușcaș ran again for president of the Romanian Football Federation, this time losing to Răzvan Burleanu. From November 2018 until July 2020, he was president at FC U Craiova 1948, a period in which the club won a promotion to the second league.

== Personal life ==
Pușcaș graduated from the National University of Physical Education and Sport (ANEFS) and the University of Mechanics.

On 27 October 2020, he released an autobiographical book titled Fotbalul în cârje (Football on crutches). On 26 March 2021, Pușcaș released his second book titled Cum devii fotbalist (How do you become a footballer).

== Honours ==
Bihor Oradea

- Divizia B: 1981–82

Steaua București

- Divizia A: 1984–85
- Cupa României: 1984–85
