= Constantin Blid =

Romanian former professional footballer

Personal information
- Full name: Constantin Adrian Blid
- Date of birth: 18 October 1967 (age 59)
- Place of birth: Bucharest, Romania
- Height: 1.85 m (6 ft 1 in)
- Position: Goalkeeper

Youth career
- Electroaparataj București

Senior career*
Years	Team	Apps	(Gls)
1985–1986	Automatica București	?	(?)
1986–1987	Steaua București	2	(0)
1987–1989	Bihor Oradea	14	(0)
1989–1996	Inter Sibiu	145	(0)
1993–1994	→ Progresul București (loan)	33	(0)
1996–1998	Rapid București	1	(0)
1998–1999	Onești	40	(0)
2000	Politehnica Timișoara	8	(0)
2000	Ceahlăul Piatra Neamț	3	(0)
2001	Juventus București	6	(0)
2001–2003	Argeș Pitești	25	(0)
Total		277	(0)
- * Club domestic league appearances and goals as of 5 June 2017

Constantin Adrian Blid (born 18 October 1967) is a Romanian former professional footballer who played as a goalkeeper.
