= Gabi Balint =

Romanian footballer & manager (born 1963)

Gavril Balint
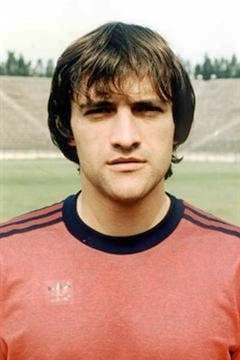
- Balint in the 1980s

Personal information
- Full name: Gavril Pele Balint
- Date of birth: 3 January 1963 (age 63)
- Place of birth: Sângeorz-Băi, Romania
- Height: 1.80 m (5 ft 11 in)
- Position: Forward

Youth career
- 1974–1978: Hebe Sângeorz-Băi
- 1978: → Luceafărul București (loan)
- 1979–1980: Gloria Bistrița

Senior career*
Years	Team	Apps	(Gls)
1980	Gloria Bistrița		
1981–1990	Steaua București	264	(69)
1990–1993	Real Burgos	83	(28)
Total		347	(97)

International career
1981	Romania U20	6	(0)
1982–1992	Romania	34	(14)

Managerial career
- 1994–1998: Romania (assistant)
- 1998–1999: Bihor Oradea
- 1999: Sportul Studențesc
- 2000: Romania (assistant)
- 2000–2001: Galatasaray (assistant)
- 2001: Romania (assistant)
- 2002–2003: Sheriff Tiraspol
- 2003–2004: Sportul Studențesc
- 2004–2005: Galatasaray (assistant)
- 2005–2006: Politehnica Timișoara (assistant)
- 2008–2009: Timișoara
- 2010–2011: Moldova
- 2013: Vaslui
- 2014: Universitatea Craiova
Medal record
Representing Romania
FIFA U-20 World Cup
Bronze medal – third place	1981 Australia
- * Club domestic league appearances and goals

Gavril Pele "Gabi" Balint (born 3 January 1963) is a Romanian former professional football manager and player, who was part of the hugely successful Steaua team of the 1980s. He now works as a television pundit for Digi Sport.

== Club career ==
Born in Sângeorz-Băi, Bistrița-Năsăud County, Balint made his Divizia A debut with Steaua București in 1981 where he played until 1990 winning the league titles in 1985, 1986, 1987, 1988 and 1989, the Romanian Cup in 1985, 1987 and 1989, the 1985–86 European Cup and the European Super Cup in 1987. At the end of the 1989–90 season, Balint became the top goalscorer of the Divizia A with 19 goals. He scored the second and last goal at the penalties shoot-out during the 1986 European Cup final, helping his team, Steaua to win the trophy.

In 1990, he was bought by Real Burgos for $1,000,000. He played for the Spanish side until his retirement in 1993.

== International career ==
Balint was capped 34 times by Romania, and scored 14 goals. He played at the 1990 World Cup where he scored twice, against Cameroon and Argentina.

== Managerial career ==
Balint started his coaching career in 1994, aged 31, when he was appointed as assistant coach of Romania under Anghel Iordănescu's regime. Four years later comes his first chance as head coach after taking charge at Sportul Studențesc, but in May 2000 he is called again to join the coaching staff of Romania as the squad prepared for the UEFA Euro 2000.

In the summer of 2000, Balint was requested by Mircea Lucescu as his assistant for Galatasaray, however he left the job after only one season, to join again Romania as assistant coach, this time under Gheorghe Hagi.

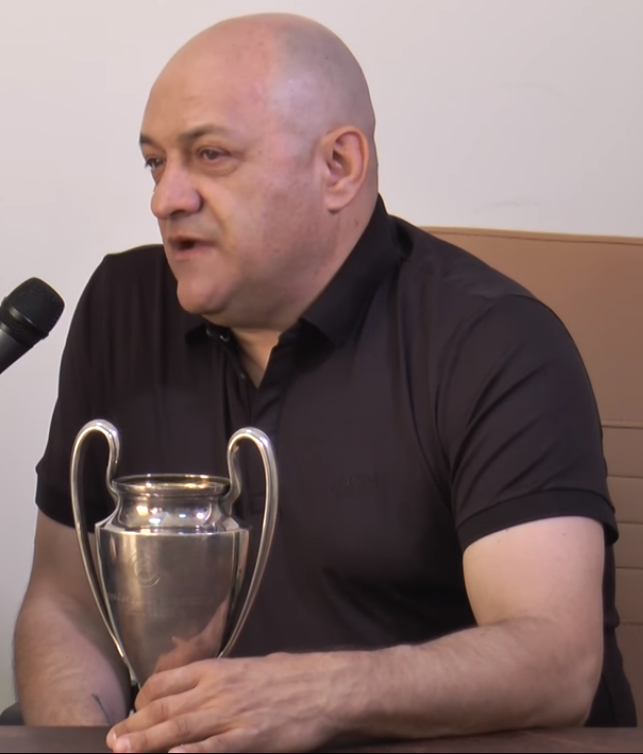
Balint giving an interview

After Hagi resigned, Balint went to Sheriff Tiraspol for his second job as head coach, taking the team in 2002.

In 2003, he returned to Romania and signed for Sportul Studențesc, now in Divizia B and helped the team win promotion back to Divizia A.

Balint returned as assistant coach for Galatasaray in 2004 to work again with Gheorghe Hagi.

In 2005, he was appointed assistant coach of FCU Politehnica Timișoara, working again with Hagi. When Hagi left, a few months later, Balint resigned also. Two years later, Balint returned to FC Timișoara, this time as a head coach.

In 2010, he became the head coach of the Moldova national team, but after the campaign for the UEFA Euro 2012, his contract ended and was not renewed. He then became a television pundit, signing a contract with Digi Sport.

In April 2013, Balint returned to coaching, signing a contract for one and a half years with FC Vaslui. In 2014 he was named head coach of Liga II side CS Universitatea Craiova and helped the club win promotion for the top-flight Liga I.

== Trivia ==
- Balint has a passion for music and Harley Davidson. He even produced his own CD.
- He is named Pele because his father was a fan of the three time World Cup winner Pelé.

== Playing statistics ==
Appearances and goals by national team and year
National team	Year	Apps	Goals
Romania	1982	3	0
Romania	1983	4	0
Romania	1984	4	2
Romania	1985	1	0
Romania	1986	3	0
Romania	1987	3	0
Romania	1988	0	0
Romania	1989	1	2
Romania	1990	10	5
Romania	1991	2	1
Romania	1992	3	4
Total		34	14

Scores and results list Romania's goal tally first, score column indicates score after each Balint goal.

#	Date	Venue	Opponent	Score	Result	Competition
1	29 July 1984	Stadionul 23 August, Iași, Romania	China	4–0	4–2	Friendly
2	31 July 1984	Stadionul Municipal, Buzău, Romania	China	1–0	1–0	Friendly
3	15 November 1989	Stadionul Steaua, Bucharest, Romania	Denmark	1–1	3–1	1990 FIFA World Cup qualification
4	15 November 1989	Stadionul Steaua, Bucharest, Romania	Denmark	3–1	3–1	1990 FIFA World Cup qualification
5	28 March 1990	Cairo International Stadium, Cairo, Egypt	Egypt	2–0	3–1	Friendly
6	28 March 1990	Cairo International Stadium, Cairo, Egypt	Egypt	3–1	3–1	Friendly
7	25 April 1990	Kiryat Eliezer Stadium, Haifa, Israel	Israel	4–1	4–1	Friendly
8	14 June 1990	Stadio San Nicola, Bari, Italy	Cameroon	1–2	1–2	1990 FIFA World Cup
9	18 June 1990	Stadio San Paolo, Naples, Italy	Argentina	1–1	1–1	1990 FIFA World Cup
10	17 April 1991	Estadio Príncipe Felipe, Cáceres, Spain	Spain	2–0	2–0	Friendly
11	6 May 1992	Stadionul Steaua, Bucharest, Romania	Faroe Islands	1–0	7–0	1994 FIFA World Cup qualification
12	6 May 1992	Stadionul Steaua, Bucharest, Romania	Faroe Islands	4–0	7–0	1994 FIFA World Cup qualification
13	6 May 1992	Stadionul Steaua, Bucharest, Romania	Faroe Islands	7–0	7–0	1994 FIFA World Cup qualification
14	20 May 1992	Stadionul Steaua, Bucharest, Romania	Wales	4–0	5–1	1994 FIFA World Cup qualification

== Managerial statistics ==
Managerial record by club and tenure
Team	From	To	Record				
Team	From	To	M	W	D	L	Win %
Bihor Oradea	1 August 1998	30 June 1999	34	15	6	13	44.12
Sportul Studențesc	1 September 1999	31 December 1999	14	8	3	3	57.14
Sheriff Tiraspol	1 July 2002	30 June 2003	30	23	3	4	76.67
Sportul Studențesc	23 December 2003	1 June 2004	15	11	2	2	73.33
FC Timișoara	29 December 2008	1 June 2009	18	12	2	4	66.67
Moldova	20 January 2010	19 December 2011	18	5	2	11	27.78
Vaslui	9 April 2013	16 June 2013	9	5	3	1	55.56
Universitatea Craiova	17 March 2014	10 June 2014	15	11	2	2	73.33
Total			153	90	23	40	58.82

== Honours ==
=== Player ===
Steaua București

- Divizia A: 1984–85, 1985–86, 1986–87, 1987–88, 1988–89
- Cupa României: 1984–85, 1986–87, 1987–88, 1988–89
- European Cup: 1985–86
- European Super Cup: 1986
- Intercontinental Cup runner-up: 1986

Romania U20

- FIFA U-20 World Cup third-place: 1981

Individual

- Divizia A top scorer: 1989–90

=== Coach ===
Sheriff Tiraspol

- Divizia Națională: 2002–03
- CIS Cup: 2003

Sportul Studențesc

- Divizia B: 2003–04

Universitatea Craiova

- Liga II: 2013–14
