= 1988–89 Divizia A =

71st season of top-tier football league in Romania

Divizia A
- Season: 1988–89
- Champions: Steaua București
- Relegated: Oţelul Galaţi; Rapid București; Târgu Mureş
- European Cup: Steaua București
- Cup Winners' Cup: Dinamo București
- UEFA Cup: Victoria București; Flacăra Moreni
- Matches: 306
- Goals: 981 (3.21 per match)
- Top goalscorer: Dorin Mateuț (43)
- Biggest home win: Steaua 11–0 Corvinul
- Biggest away win: Farul 0–7 Dinamo
- Highest scoring: Steaua 11–0 Corvinul
- Longest winning run: Steaua, Dinamo (14)
- Longest unbeaten run: Steaua (34)
- Longest losing run: Târgu Mureș (22)

The 1988–89 Divizia A was the seventy-first season of Divizia A, the top-level football league of Romania. The Dinamo versus Steaua football derby match played on 3 December 1988 was the subject of the 2014 Romanian documentary film The Second Game (Romanian: Al doilea joc) directed by Corneliu Porumboiu.

== Teams ==
Location of teams in 1988-89 Divizia A

== League table ==
Pos	Team	Pld	W	D	L	GF	GA	GD	Pts	Qualification or relegation
1	Steaua București (C)	34	31	3	0	121	28	+93	65	Qualification to European Cup first round
2	Dinamo București	34	30	2	2	130	30	+100	62	Qualification to Cup Winners' Cup first round
3	Victoria București	34	20	5	9	81	60	+21	45	Qualification to UEFA Cup first round
4	Flacăra Moreni	34	16	4	14	63	47	+16	36	Qualification to UEFA Cup first round
5	Universitatea Craiova	34	15	6	13	52	52	0	36	
6	Sportul Studenţesc București	34	15	4	15	52	59	−7	34	
7	Bihor Oradea	34	13	6	15	40	46	−6	32	
8	Olt Scornicești	34	12	8	14	38	47	−9	32	
9	Farul Constanța	34	14	4	16	36	48	−12	32	
10	FCM Brașov	34	12	7	15	46	52	−6	31	
11	Inter Sibiu	34	13	5	16	45	57	−12	31	
12	SC Bacău	34	13	4	17	49	55	−6	30	
13	Argeș Pitești	34	13	4	17	40	50	−10	30	
14	Universitatea Cluj	34	11	8	15	43	55	−12	30	
15	Corvinul Hunedoara	34	13	3	18	47	68	−21	29	
16	Oțelul Galați (R)	34	11	6	17	36	59	−23	28	Relegation to Divizia B
17	Rapid București (R)	34	10	3	21	39	67	−28	23	Invitation to Intertoto Cup; Relegation to Divizia B
18	ASA Târgu Mureș (R)	34	2	2	30	23	101	−78	6	Relegation to Divizia B

Source: LT
Rules for classification: 1) points; 2) goal difference; 3) number of goals scored
(C) Champions; (R) Relegated

=== Positions by round ===
Team ╲ Round	1	2	3	4	5	6	7	8	9	10	11	12	13	14	15	16	17	18	19	20	21	22	23	24	25	26	27	28	29	30	31	32	33	34
ASA Târgu Mureș	18	15	16	17	18	17	17	17	18	18	18	18	18	18	18	18	18	18	18	18	18	18	18	18	18	18	18	18	18	18	18	18	18	18
Argeș Pitești	5	9	5	8	10	14	10	13	14	14	10	13	10	11	12	9	9	10	12	12	12	13	9	12	11	12	11	10	8	11	11	11	11	13
Bacău	16	18	13	16	17	15	15	16	16	15	17	14	16	13	16	11	15	11	10	8	10	12	15	11	13	15	13	16	15	16	15	14	13	12
Bihor Oradea	3	5	10	9	5	7	9	7	11	13	14	17	17	17	15	13	10	9	11	9	11	9	13	16	12	11	10	11	11	9	7	8	6	7
Brașov	13	11	14	11	14	12	14	10	13	9	11	10	11	12	17	12	16	12	8	6	7	6	7	7	10	8	7	6	7	10	10	9	10	10
Corvinul Hunedoara	6	3	7	6	9	5	8	5	9	7	9	11	8	5	5	6	5	5	7	10	6	8	12	15	15	14	16	13	14	15	16	15	16	15
Universitatea Craiova	17	17	18	15	12	8	5	4	7	6	5	5	6	8	9	14	12	15	15	17	14	16	14	9	8	10	8	9	9	7	5	5	5	5
Dinamo București	2	1	1	1	1	1	1	1	1	1	1	1	1	1	1	1	1	1	1	2	2	2	2	2	2	2	2	2	2	2	2	2	2	2
Farul Constanța	1	4	8	13	8	10	12	14	15	17	15	9	14	9	11	15	17	13	16	14	15	14	16	13	14	13	15	12	12	12	12	13	12	9
Flacăra Moreni	7	13	15	12	11	9	11	8	5	4	6	4	5	7	7	7	6	6	5	5	5	4	4	4	4	4	4	4	4	4	4	4	4	4
Inter Sibiu	8	6	3	7	4	6	4	6	4	5	4	6	4	4	4	4	4	4	4	4	4	5	5	5	5	5	6	7	6	5	8	10	9	11
Olt Scornicești	9	10	12	10	13	13	7	9	8	11	8	8	9	10	8	8	8	7	6	7	9	11	8	6	6	7	9	8	10	8	9	6	7	8
Oțelul Galați	15	12	11	14	15	16	18	18	17	16	16	12	15	15	10	10	13	17	17	15	17	17	17	17	17	17	17	15	13	13	14	16	15	16
Rapid București	10	16	17	18	16	18	16	12	10	12	13	16	13	16	14	17	14	16	14	16	16	15	11	14	16	16	14	17	17	17	17	17	17	17
Sportul Studențesc București	14	8	6	3	6	4	6	11	6	8	12	15	12	14	13	16	11	14	13	13	13	7	6	8	7	6	5	5	5	6	6	7	8	6
Steaua București	4	2	2	2	2	2	2	2	2	2	2	2	2	2	2	2	2	2	2	1	1	1	1	1	1	1	1	1	1	1	1	1	1	1
Universitatea Cluj	11	7	4	5	7	11	13	15	12	10	7	7	7	6	6	5	7	8	9	11	8	10	10	10	9	9	12	14	16	14	13	12	14	14
Victoria București	12	14	9	4	3	3	3	3	3	3	3	3	3	3	3	3	3	3	3	3	3	3	3	3	3	3	3	3	3	3	3	3	3	3

Source: LT (in Romanian)

=== Results ===
Home \ Away	ASA	ARG	BAC	BHO	BRA	COR	UCR	DIN	FAR	FLA	INT	OLT	OȚE	RAP	SPO	STE	UCL	VIB
ASA Târgu Mureș	—	0–2	1–2	1–2	1–3	1–2	1–2	0–7	2–4	0–2	2–1	3–0	1–1	0–1	1–3	1–5	1–1	0–4
Argeș Pitești	2–1	—	3–0	2–1	0–0	3–1	5–0	1–2	3–1	2–1	0–0	0–0	1–1	1–0	2–1	0–1	2–1	4–3
Bacău	1–0	3–1	—	1–0	2–1	3–1	6–0	1–3	0–0	1–0	1–0	1–0	4–0	1–2	6–4	2–3	2–1	1–2
Bihor Oradea	4–0	2–0	2–0	—	2–0	3–0	2–0	1–2	2–0	1–2	1–1	2–1	0–1	3–1	1–0	2–3	5–2	1–2
Brașov	4–1	2–1	4–0	1–0	—	1–0	2–2	1–3	0–0	2–1	1–0	4–1	1–0	1–0	4–2	2–2	1–1	1–1
Corvinul Hunedoara	2–0	2–0	4–2	0–0	4–2	—	0–0	1–2	1–0	3–2	1–1	0–1	4–0	2–0	1–0	1–2	2–1	4–2
Universitatea Craiova	2–0	2–1	1–1	3–0	3–0	3–1	—	3–6	1–0	1–0	1–2	3–1	2–3	5–0	3–0	1–5	4–0	2–2
Dinamo București	7–0	1–0	0–0	5–1	3–0	3–1	2–0	—	6–0	3–1	8–1	6–0	6–3	6–0	6–1	0–0	4–1	3–1
Farul Constanța	3–0	0–1	0–0	0–1	1–0	1–0	1–0	0–7	—	3–2	2–1	2–0	0–0	1–0	3–0	1–2	3–1	4–3
Flacăra Moreni	2–0	2–0	3–1	5–0	3–2	3–1	1–0	1–5	3–0	—	5–0	2–0	3–1	4–1	3–0	1–3	1–2	3–2
Inter Sibiu	4–1	4–0	1–0	2–0	3–0	1–0	1–1	2–4	1–0	1–0	—	3–1	2–0	3–2	2–1	0–3	0–0	1–2
Olt Scornicești	4–0	1–0	3–2	0–0	1–1	4–2	1–1	1–0	1–0	1–1	4–0	—	2–1	2–0	2–2	1–3	2–1	1–2
Oțelul Galați	3–0	2–1	2–0	0–0	2–1	0–1	2–0	0–2	1–3	2–1	2–0	0–0	—	2–0	0–1	0–2	2–2	0–2
Rapid București	5–0	2–0	1–0	1–1	2–0	4–1	0–1	2–6	1–2	0–0	1–0	1–0	3–0	—	4–4	2–8	2–4	0–1
Sportul Studențesc București	3–0	2–0	2–1	1–0	2–0	5–1	2–3	1–4	2–0	2–1	1–0	1–0	3–2	3–0	—	0–4	0–0	1–1
Steaua București	7–0	6–0	3–0	5–0	3–2	11–0	2–1	2–1	2–0	4–1	4–2	3–1	5–0	2–0	2–1	—	5–0	3–2
Universitatea Cluj	3–0	1–0	2–1	0–0	2–0	2–1	0–1	0–3	2–0	1–1	3–2	0–1	4–0	1–0	0–1	2–2	—	0–1
Victoria București	3–2	4–2	5–3	4–0	3–2	5–2	2–0	1–4	2–1	2–2	5–3	0–0	2–3	2–1	2–0	1–4	5–2	—

Source: LT (in Romanian)
Legend: Blue = home team win; Yellow = draw; Red = away team win.

== Top goalscorers ==
Position	Player	Club	Goals
1	Dorin Mateuț	Dinamo București	43
2	Marcel Coraș	Victoria București	36
3	Gheorghe Hagi	Steaua București	31
4	Victor Pițurcă	Steaua București	23
5	Constantin Lala	Flacăra Moreni	21
5	Claudiu Vaișcovici	Dinamo București	21

== Champion squad ==
Steaua București

Goalkeepers: Silviu Lung (29 / 0); Gheorghe Liliac (5 / 0).
Defenders: Dan Petrescu (28 / 5); Adrian Bumbescu (19 / 0); Ștefan Iovan (29 / 1); Miodrag Belodedici (17 / 5); Nicolae Ungureanu (31 / 1); Niță Cireașă (2 / 0); Petre Bunaciu (6 / 0); Daniel Minea (13 / 0).
Midfielders: Iosif Rotariu (30 / 16); Tudorel Stoica (23 / 3); Lucian Bălan (12 / 1).
Forwards: Marius Lăcătuș (28 / 10); Victor Pițurcă (22 / 23); Gabi Balint (29 / 4); Gheorghe Hagi (30 / 31); Ilie Stan (14 / 2); Ilie Dumitrescu (29 / 8); Gheorghe Pena (13 / 2); Horațiu Lasconi (6 / 1); Lucian Măstăcan (9 / 0); Adrian Negrău (13 / 5); Marian Mirea (1 / 0); Axente Bogdan Muscă (1 / 0).
(league appearances and goals listed in brackets)

Manager: Anghel Iordănescu.

== Attendances ==
No.	Club	Average
1	Craiova	20,588
2	Steaua	19,647
3	Sibiu	16,059
4	Farul	15,882
5	Oţelul	14,294
6	FC Rapid	14,176
7	Dinamo 1948	11,588
8	Bihor	10,882
9	U Cluj	10,612
10	Argeş	10,294
11	Bacău	9,206
12	Braşov	7,118
13	Hunedoara	6,718
14	Sportul Studenţesc	6,059
15	Olt Scorniceşti	5,882
16	Victoria Bucureşti	4,206
17	Flacăra	4,194
18	Tîrgu Mureş	3,518

== See also ==
- 1988–89 Divizia B
