= 1986–87 Cupa României =

Tournament details
- Country: Romania

Final positions
- Champions: Steaua București
- Runners-up: Dinamo București

The 1986–87 Cupa României was the 49th edition of Romania's most prestigious football cup competition.

The title was won by Steaua București against Dinamo București.

== Format ==
The competition is an annual knockout tournament.

First round proper matches are played on the ground of the lowest ranked team, then from the second round proper the matches are played on a neutral location.

If a match is drawn after 90 minutes, the game goes in extra time, if the scored is still tight after 120 minutes, then the winner will be established at penalty kicks.

From the first edition, the teams from Divizia A entered in competition in sixteen finals, rule which remained till today.

== First round proper ==
| Team 1 | Score | Team 2 |
|---|---|---|
10 December 1986
| Automatica Alexandria (Div. C) | 2–2 (a.e.t.)(1-4 p) | (Div. A) Gloria Buzău |
| FEPA '74 Bârlad (Div. B) | 0–2 | (Div. A) Victoria București |
| Metalul Bocşa (Div. B) | 0–1 (a.e.t.) | (Div. A) Argeş Piteşti |
| ICIM Braşov (Div. B) | 3–0 | (Div. A) Chimia Râmnicu Vâlcea |
| Progresul Vulcan București (Div. B) | 1–2 | (Div. A) Petrolul Ploiești |
| IS Câmpia Turzii (Div. C) | 0–1 | (Div. A) Rapid București |
| FC Constanța (Div. B) | 2–0 | (Div. A) Universitatea Cluj |
| Jiul Petroşani (Div. A) | 4–1 | (Div. A) Corvinul Hunedoara |
| CIL Sighetu Marmației (Div. B) | 0–2 | (Div. A) Oțelul Galați |
| Victoria Tecuci (Div. C) | 1–3 | (Div. A) SC Bacău |
| CS Târgovişte (Div. B) | 0–1 | (Div. A) Sportul Studenţesc București |
| Flacăra Moreni (Div. A) | 1–2 | (Div. A) FCM Brașov |
| Minerul Paroşeni (Div. B) | 1–1 (a.e.t.)(4-5 p) | (Div. A) Universitatea Craiova |
28 February 1987
| Explorări Câmpulung Moldov. (Div. C) | 1–0 (a.e.t.) | (Div. A) Olt Scornicești |
1 March 1987
| Gloria Bistrița (Div. B) | 3–5 | (Div. A) Steaua București |
6 May 1987
| Metalurgistul Cugir (Div. C) | 1–4 | (Div. A) Dinamo București |

== Second round proper ==
| Team 1 | Score | Team 2 |
|---|---|---|
27 May 1987
| Steaua București | 2–0 | ICIM Braşov |
| Victoria București | 2–2 (a.e.t.)(3-2 p) | Sportul Studenţesc București |
| Dinamo București | 4–0 | Explorări Câmpulung Moldovenesc |
| Universitatea Craiova | 5–3 (a.e.t.) | FC Constanța |
| Oțelul Galați | 2–0 | Petrolul Ploiești |
| Rapid București | 1–0 | Jiul Petroşani |
| Argeş Piteşti | 4–2 (a.e.t.) | Gloria Buzău |
| FCM Brașov | 2–0 | SC Bacău |

== Quarter-finals ==
| Team 1 | Score | Team 2 |
|---|---|---|
16 June 1987
| Steaua București | 1–0 | Rapid București |
| Dinamo București | 2–1 | Oțelul Galați |
| FCM Brașov | 2–1 (a.e.t.) | Argeş Piteşti |
| Victoria București | 1–0 (a.e.t.) | Universitatea Craiova |

== Semi-finals ==
| Team 1 | Score | Team 2 |
|---|---|---|
23 June 1987
| Dinamo București | 4–2 | Victoria București |
| Steaua București | 4–0 | FCM Brașov |

== Final ==
28 June 1987
17:30 EET

| Steaua București | 1–0 | Dinamo București |
|---|---|---|
| Bölöni 25' | Report |

23 August, Bucharest
Attendance: 60,000
Referee: Radu Petrescu (Brașov)
