= 1981–82 FC Dinamo București season =

FC Dinamo București
1981–82 season
- Manager: Valentin Stănescu
- Divizia A: 1st
- Romanian Cup: Winner
- UEFA Cup: Third round
- Top goalscorer: Dudu Georgescu (11 goals)

The 1981–82 season was FC Dinamo București's 33rd season in Divizia A. Dinamo dominated both national competitions, winning the tenth championship title and the fourth Romanian Cup. The UEFA Cup season brings some great wins for Dinamo. The red-whites meet Levski Sofia, team of Sirakov and Iskrenov (3-0 and 1-2). In the second round, a terrifying "double": Dinamo-Internazionale (with Bergoni, Bagni, Prohaska, Altobelli, Baresi, Oriali, Marini and Becallossi). At Milan, 1-1 (authors: Pasinato and Custov) and back home in Bucharest, 3-2 for the "dogs", in the extra time! Dinamo is eliminated by the Swedish team IFK Göteborg, managed by Sven-Göran Eriksson, which later ends up winning the trophy.

== Results ==
Divizia A
Round	Date	Opponent	Stadium	Result
1	8 August 1981	U Cluj	A	1-2
2	15 August 1981	ASA Târgu Mureș	H	3-2
3	23 August 1981	Jiul Petroșani	A	2-2
4	29 August 1981	Sportul Studențesc	H	3-0
5	2 September 1981	Poli Timișoara	H	3-0
6	5 September 1981	FC Constanța	A	3-1
7	25 September 1981	FC Olt	H	4-2
8	3 October 1981	CS Târgoviște	A	1-1
9	14 October 1981	Steaua București	A	0-0
10	17 October 1981	Chimia Râmnicu Vâlcea	H	1-0
11	25 October 1981	FC Argeş	A	2-0
12	30 October 1981	SC Bacău	H	4-1
13	15 November 1981	U Craiova	A	0-2
14	18 November 1981	Progresul București	A	3-1
15	21 November 1981	UTA	H	2-1
16	29 November 1981	Corvinul Hunedoara	A	1-2
17	5 December 1981	FCM Brașov	H	2-0
18	28 February 1982	U Cluj	H	3-0
19	7 March 1982	ASA Târgu Mureș	A	0-1
20	14 March 1982	Jiul Petroșani	H	2-1
21	20 March 1982	Sportul Studențesc	A	1-1
22	28 March 1982	Poli Timișoara	A	0-2
23	3 April 1982	FC Constanța	H	4-0
24	7 April 1982	FC Olt	A	0-3
25	10 April 1982	CS Târgoviște	H	3-0
26	18 April 1982	Steaua București	H	2-1
27	24 April 1982	Chimia Râmnicu Vâlcea	A	0-0
28	5 May 1982	FC Argeş	H	1-0
29	23 May 1982	SC Bacău	A	1-1
30	29 May 1982	U Craiova	H	4-0
31	2 June 1982	Progresul București	H	2-0
32	5 June 1982	UTA	A	0-0
33	9 June 1982	Corvinul Hunedoara	H	3-2
34	12 June 1982	FCM Brașov	A	1-2

Divizia A 1981–82 Winners
Dinamo București
10th Title

Cupa României
Round	Date	Opponent	Stadium	Result
Last 32	2 December 1981	Cimentul Medgidia	A	4-1
Last 16	31 March 1982	FC Constanța	Ploiești	1-0
Quarter-finals	26 May 1982	Corvinul Hunedoara	Brașov	4-3
Semifinals	16 June 1982	Gloria Bistrița	Brașov	1-0
Final	20 June 1982	FC Baia Mare	București	3-2

Cupa României 1981–82 Winners
Dinamo București
4th Title

== Romanian Cup final ==
20 June 1982

Dinamo București	3–2	FC Baia Mare
Iordache 43'; Georgescu 58', 63'		Dragomirescu 48'; Koller 48' (pen.)

Stadionul 23 August, Bucharest
Attendance: 15,000
Referee: Sever Drăgulici (Turnu Severin)

DINAMO:
GK	Dumitru Moraru
DF	Ion Marin
DF	Cornel Dinu
DF	Adrian Bumbescu
DF	Teofil Stredie
MF	Gheorghe Mulțescu
MF	Dudu Georgescu
MF	Alexandru Custov
FW	Pompiliu Iordache
FW	Florea Văetuș
FW	Costel Orac
Manager:
Valentin Stănescu

FC BAIA MARE:
GK	Vasile Moldovan
DF	Imre Szepi
DF	Miron Borz
DF	Ioan Tătăran
DF	Alexandru Koller
MF	Cristian Ene
MF	Radu Pamfil
FW	Marin Sabău
FW	Constantin Dragomirescu
FW	Viorel Buzgău	(substituted off) 65'
FW	Adalbert Rozsnyai
Substitutes:
FW	Vasile Caciureac	(substituted in) 65'
Manager:
Paul Popescu

== UEFA Cup ==
First round

16 September 1981
18:30

Dinamo București	3–0	Levski Sofia
Georgescu 13', 40'; Dragnea 37'

Stadionul Dinamo, Bucharest
Attendance: 13,000
Referee: Talal Tokat (Turkey)

29 September 1981
18:30

Levski Sofia	2–1	Dinamo București
Kurdov 12', 35'		Augustin 89'

Vasil Levski National Stadium, Sofia
Attendance: 35,000
Referee: Eldar Asim Zade (Soviet Union)

Dinamo București won 4-2 on aggregate

Second round

21 October 1981
20:45

Internazionale Milano	1–1	Dinamo București
Pasinato 24'		Custov 39'

Stadio Giuseppe Meazza, Milan
Attendance: 40,000
Referee: Georges Konrath (France)

4 November 1981
14:00

Dinamo București	3 – 2 (a.e.t.)	Internazionale Milano
Georgescu 30'; Augustin 101'; Orac 107'		Altobelli 47'; Prohaska 97'

Stadionul Dinamo, Bucharest
Attendance: 20,000
Referee: Roger Schoeters (Belgium)

Dinamo București won 4–3 on aggregate

Third round

25 November 1981
19:00

IFK Göteborg	3–1	Dinamo București
Holmgren 28'; Nilsson 34', 52'		Mulţescu 65'

Ullevi, Gothenburg
Attendance: 10,000
Referee: Volker Roth (West Germany)

9 December 1981
13:00

Dinamo București	0–1	IFK Göteborg
		Nilsson 25'

Stadionul Dinamo, Bucharest
Referee: Egbert Mulder (Netherlands)

IFK Göteborg won 4-1 on aggregate

== Squad ==
Goalkeepers: Constantin Eftimescu (6 / 0); Dumitru Moraru (31 / 0).
Defenders: Marin Ion (30 / 0); Nicușor Vlad (9 / 1); Adrian Bumbescu (23 / 0); Cornel Dinu (29 / 0); Gheorghe Dumitrescu (3 / 0); Teofil Stredie (25 / 2); Nelu Stănescu (28 / 0); Ioan Mărginean (6 / 1).
Midfielders: Ionel Augustin (31 / 7); Marin Dragnea (23 / 7); Gheorghe Mulțescu (26 / 9); Alexandru Custov (31 / 6); Laurențiu Moldovan (6 / 0).
Forwards: Cornel Țălnar (30 / 2); Pompiliu Iordache (15 / 1); Dudu Georgescu (24 / 11); Florea Văetuș (13 / 5); Costel Orac (32 / 9); Dorel Zamfir (9 / 0).
(league appearances and goals listed in brackets)

Manager: Valentin Stănescu.
