= 1982–83 FC Dinamo București season =

FC Dinamo București
1982–83 season
- Manager: Dumitru Nicolae Nicuşor
- Divizia A: 1st
- Romanian Cup: Semifinals
- European Cup: Second round
- Top goalscorer: Ionel Augustin (14 goals)

The 1982–83 season was FC Dinamo București's 34th season in Divizia A of Romanian association football.

Dumitru Nicolae Nicuşor is promoted as team manager, and brings the 11th championship title for Dinamo. The main rival was Sportul Studenţesc, but Dinamo took the first place at the half of the season and kept it until the final. In the Romanian Cup, Dinamo was eliminated by Universitatea Craiova in the semifinals, after the penalty kicks. After a 5-year absence, Dinamo reappears in the European Champions Cup, meeting (and eliminating) Vaaleregen Oslo. In the next stage, Dinamo had to confront a difficult opponent: the team of Vizek and Nehoda, Dukla Prague. They win at home, with 2–0, obtaining the qualification at Prague: 1–2. Dinamo is eliminated by Aston Villa, club of Bremmer, Cowans, Withe, Shaw and Morley.

== Results ==
Divizia A
Round	Date	Opponent	Stadium	Result
1	7 August 1982	FCM Brașov	A	1-0
2	11 August 1982	Petrolul Ploiești	H	6-0
3	14 August 1982	ASA Târgu Mureș	A	1-1
4	21 August 1982	FC Bihor	H	3-1
5	28 August 1982	FC Olt	A	1-1
6	11 September 1982	Poli Iași	H	1-0
7	19 September 1982	Corvinul Hunedoara	A	1-1
8	25 September 1982	FC Argeş	H	2-0
9	3 October 1982	Steaua București	A	1-1
10	9 October 1982	Jiul Petroșani	A	1-1
11	16 October 1982	Poli Timișoara	H	7-2
12	24 October 1982	Sportul Studențesc	H	1-1
13	29 October 1982	Chimia Râmnicu Vâlcea	A	0-0
14	7 November 1982	CS Târgoviște	H	3-0
15	13 November 1982	U Craiova	A	1-1
16	21 November 1982	SC Bacău	H	3-1
17	24 November 1982	FC Constanța	A	1-1
18	5 March 1983	FCM Brașov	H	3-1
19	12 March 1983	Petrolul Ploiești	A	1-1
20	19 March 1983	ASA Târgu Mureș	H	2-1
21	23 March 1983	FC Bihor	A	2-2
22	26 March 1983	FC Olt	H	3-1
23	2 April 1983	Poli Iași	A	0-2
24	6 April 1983	Corvinul Hunedoara	H	2-0
25	19 April 1983	FC Argeş	A	0-1
26	22 April 1983	Steaua București	H	1-1
27	30 April 1983	Jiul Petroșani	H	1-0
28	4 May 1983	Poli Timișoara	A	3-1
29	18 May 1983	Sportul Studențesc	A	3-0
30	25 May 1983	Chimia Râmnicu Vâlcea	H	2-0
31	14 June 1983	CS Târgoviște	A	1-1
32	18 June 1983	U Craiova	H	1-1
33	25 June 1983	SC Bacău	A	0-0
34	2 July 1983	FC Constanța	H	3-0

Divizia A 1982–83 Winners
Dinamo București
11th Title

Cupa României
Round	Date	Opponent	Stadium	Result
Last 32	23 February 1983	Poli Iași	Brăila	3-1
Last 16	27 February 1983	Chimia Râmnicu Vâlcea	Târgoviște	1-0
Quarter-finals	26 June 1983	FC Argeş	Ploiești	2-1
Semifinals	29 June 1983	U Craiova	Sibiu	1-1 (2-4 pen.)

== European Cup ==
Qualifying Phase

25 August 1982
20:00

Dinamo București	3–1	Vålerenga Fotball
Augustin 35'; Georgescu 45' (pen.), 66'		Gran 57'

Stadionul 23 August, Bucharest
Attendance: 70,000
Referee: Arsen Hoxha (Albania)

1 September 1982
19:00

Vålerenga Fotball	2–1	Dinamo București
Jacobsen 45'; Davidsen 88'		Custov 2'

Ullevaal Stadion, Oslo
Referee: Osmo Orankangas (Finland)

Dinamo București won 4-3 on aggregate

First round

15 September 1982
19:30

Dinamo București	2–0	Dukla Prague
Mulţescu 30'; Georgescu 52' (pen.)

Stadionul 23 August, Bucharest
Referee: Károly Palotai (Hungary)

29 September 1982
20:00

Dukla Prague	2 – 1 (a.e.t.)	Dinamo București
Nehoda 15', 30'		Ţălnar 94'

Dukla Stadium, Prague
Attendance: 4,000
Referee: Anatoli Milchenko (Soviet Union)

Dinamo București won 3–2 on aggregate

Second round

20 October 1982
18:15

Dinamo București	0–2	Aston Villa
		Shaw 10', 77'

Stadionul 23 August, Bucharest
Attendance: 80,000
Referee: Emilio Carlos Guruceta Muro (Spain)

3 November 1982
19:30

Aston Villa	4–2	Dinamo București
Shaw 6', 51', 67'; Walters 88'		Mulţescu 30'; Iordache 72'

Villa Park, Birmingham
Attendance: 22,244
Referee: Erik Fredriksson (Sweden)

Aston Villa won 6-2 on aggregate

== Squad ==
Goalkeepers: Constantin Eftimescu (6 / 0); Dumitru Moraru (31 / 0).
Defenders: Marin Ion (29 / 0); Cornel Dinu (25 / 0); Alexandru Nicolae (30 / 4); Teofil Stredie (26 / 0); Nelu Stănescu (14 / 0); Nicușor Vlad (5 / 0); Laurențiu Moldovan (8 / 0); Ioan Mărginean (1 / 0).
Midfielders: Gheorghe Mulțescu (31 / 6); Ionel Augustin (31 / 14); Marin Dragnea (30 / 7); Alexandru Custov (28 / 2); Lică Movilă (16 / 4).
Forwards: Cornel Țălnar (23 / 4); Pompiliu Iordache (26 / 5); Dudu Georgescu (8 / 5); Florea Văetuș (31 / 7); Costel Orac (30 / 4); Stere Sertov (3 / 0).
(league appearances and goals listed in brackets)

Manager: Nicolae Dumitru.
