= Cornel Țălnar =

Romanian footballer and manager (born 1957)

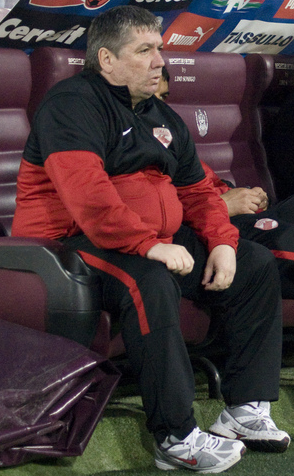
- Țălnar in 2010

Personal information
- Date of birth: 9 June 1957 (age 69)
- Place of birth: Bărăbanț, Alba County, Romania
- Height: 1.66 m (5 ft 5 in)
- Position: Winger

Youth career
- 1973–1977: Unirea Alba Iulia

Senior career*
Years	Team	Apps	(Gls)
1977–1985	Dinamo București	230	(24)
1985–1986	Brașov	18	(2)
1986–1987	Victoria București	43	(7)
1988	Petrolul Ploiești	6	(0)
1988–1991	Unirea Alba Iulia		
Total		297	(33)

International career
1979–1981	Romania	6	(0)

Managerial career
- 1989–1995: Unirea Alba Iulia
- 1995–1996: Inter Sibiu
- 1996–1997: Dinamo București
- 1997–1998: Universitatea Cluj
- 1998–1999: Brașov
- 2001: Ceahlăul Piatra Neamț
- 2002–2003: Poiana Câmpina (technical director)
- 2003: Poiana Câmpina
- 2006: Brașov
- 2007: Dinamo București II
- 2007–2008: Dinamo București
- 2008: Dinamo București
- 2009: Universitatea Cluj
- 2009–2010: Dinamo București
- 2012: Dinamo București II
- 2012–2013: Dinamo București
- 2013: Oman Club
- 2014: Brașov
- 2015: Concordia Chiajna
- 2016–2017: Brașov
- 2017: Luceafărul Oradea
- * Club domestic league appearances and goals

Cornel Țălnar (born 9 June 1957) is a Romanian former football player and manager.

== Club career ==
Țălnar, nicknamed "Țânțarul" (The Mosquito), was born on 9 June 1957 in Bărăbanț, Alba County, Romania and began playing junior-level football in 1973 at Unirea Alba Iulia. He played his first Divizia A match on 21 August 1977, representing Dinamo București, as coach Ion Nunweiller sent him to replace Ionel Augustin in the 60th minute of a 0–0 draw against SC Bacău. Țălnar spent a total of eight seasons playing for Dinamo, winning three consecutive Divizia A titles from 1982 to 1984. At the first he contributed under coach Valentin Stănescu with two goals scored in 30 matches. In the second he played 23 games, netting four goals and in the third he made 30 appearances, scoring once, working with coach Nicolae Dumitru for both. Țălnar also won two Cupa României with The Red Dogs, but played in only one of the finals, the one in 1984 when coach Dumitru used him the entire match in the 2–1 win over rivals Steaua București. He made some notable performances with Dinamo in European competitions, such as helping the club eliminate Inter Milan in the 1981–82 UEFA Cup. Subsequently, he appeared in seven matches in the 1983–84 European Cup edition and scored one goal in the 5–3 victory on aggregate against title holders Hamburg, reaching the semi-finals where they were defeated by Liverpool. After his spell with Dinamo ended, Țălnar went to play for Brașov, Victoria București and Petrolul Ploiești. At the latter, he made his last Divizia A appearance on 24 April 1988 in a 1–0 win over Olt Scornicești, totaling 297 matches with 33 goals in the competition and 31 games with four goals in European competitions. He ended his career by playing three seasons in his native Alba County for Divizia B team Unirea Alba Iulia.

== International career ==
Țălnar played six matches for Romania, making his debut on 1 June 1979 when coach Ștefan Kovacs sent him in the 74th minute to replace Mihai Romilă in a 1–0 friendly loss to East Germany. His following three games were friendlies. His last two were a 1–0 home victory against Norway and a 2–1 away loss to Switzerland in the 1982 World Cup qualifiers.

== Managerial career ==
Țălnar started his career as manager in 1989, being a player-coach at Divizia B team Unirea Alba Iulia. In the 1998–99 Divizia B season he led Brașov to earn promotion in the first league, but was replaced shortly afterwards with Ioan Andone. He managed several clubs in Romania, being coach at Dinamo București on five occasions. In 2013, he had his only coaching experience outside of Romania, in Oman's second league at Oman Club. Țălnar has a total of 160 games managed in the Romanian first league, consisting of 62 victories, 40 draws and 58 losses.

== Personal life ==
His nephew, Gheorghe Grozav, is also a footballer.

Sports commentator Ilie Dobre wrote a book about him titled Cornel Țălnar - leul neîmblânzit al gazonului (Cornel Țălnar - the untamed lion of the field), which was released in 2000.

== Honours ==
=== Player ===
Dinamo București

- Divizia A: 1981–82, 1982–83, 1983–84
- Cupa României: 1981–82, 1983–84

=== Manager ===
FC Brașov

- Divizia B: 1998–99
