= Teofil Stredie =

Romanian footballer

Personal information
- Date of birth: 6 March 1958 (age 68)
- Place of birth: Zvoriștea, Romania
- Position: Central defender

Senior career*
Years	Team	Apps	(Gls)
1975–1979	Dinamo Slatina		
1980–1983	Dinamo București	88	(6)
1983–1984	Corvinul Hunedoara	12	(1)
1984	Dinamo București	5	(1)
1985	Victoria București (Note: The statistics for the 1984–85 Divizia B season are unavailable.)	2	(0)
1986–1988	Automatica București		
Total		107	(8)

International career
1983	Romania Olympic	2	(0)
- * Club domestic league appearances and goals

Teofil Stredie (born 6 March 1958) is a Romanian former footballer who played as a central defender.

== Club career ==
Stredie was born on 6 March 1958 in Zvoriștea, Romania and began playing senior-level football in 1975 in Divizia B at Dinamo Slatina. In 1980, he joined Dinamo București, making his Divizia A debut on 13 April 1980 under coach Angelo Niculescu in a 1–0 away loss to Politehnica Iași. In the 1981–82 season, Stredie helped the club win The Double, as coach Valentin Stănescu used him in 25 league games with two goals scored and he played the entire match in the 3–2 victory over FC Baia Mare in the Cupa României final. During the same season, he played five matches in the 1981–82 UEFA Cup campaign, as the team eliminated Levski Sofia and Inter Milan, before being defeated by IFK Göteborg in the round of 16. In the following season, he won another title with Dinamo, playing 26 matches under coach Nicolae Dumitru. He also appeared in six games in the 1982–83 European Cup season, as the club got past Vålerenga and Dukla Prague in the first rounds, being eliminated by Aston Villa after a 6–2 aggregate loss. In the summer of 1983, Stredie, Florea Văetuș, Nicușor Vlad and two other players were transferred from Dinamo to Corvinul in exchange for Mircea Rednic and Ioan Andone. After one year, he returned to Dinamo. In 1985, Stredie joined Divizia B club Victoria București, which he helped—alongside coach Florin Cheran—to earn first-league promotion after one year. On 15 September 1985, he made his last Divizia A appearance in a 1–0 victory against Corvinul, totaling 107 matches with eight goals in the competition. Stredie retired in 1988 after playing for Automatica București.

== International career ==
In 1983, Stredie played in two matches for Romania's Olympic team, both of which resulted in losses to Bulgaria and Yugoslavia.

== Honours ==
Dinamo București

- Divizia A: 1981–82, 1982–83
- Cupa României: 1981–82

Victoria București

- Divizia B: 1984–85
