= Dorel Zamfir =

Romanian footballer (1961–2023)

Personal information
- Date of birth: 30 September 1961
- Place of birth: Vișeu de Sus, Romania
- Date of death: 6 October 2023 (aged 62)
- Place of death: Bucharest, Romania
- Position: Right midfielder

Youth career
- 1968–1977: FC Constanța

Senior career*
Years	Team	Apps	(Gls)
1977–1979	FC Constanța	43	(3)
1980–1982	Dinamo București	27	(2)
1982	Steaua București	8	(2)
1983–1989	Argeș Pitești	196	(17)
- Gloria Bistrița
- Flacăra Moreni
Total		274	(24)

International career
1981	Romania U20	5	(1)

Managerial career
- Flacăra Moreni (player-coach)
Medal record
Representing Romania
FIFA World Youth Championship
Bronze medal – third place	FIFA U-20 World Cup	1981
- * Club domestic league appearances and goals

Dorel Zamfir (30 September 1961 – 6 October 2023) was a Romanian footballer who played as a right midfielder.

== Club career ==
Zamfir was born on 30 September 1961 in Vișeu de Sus, Maramureș County, Romania, but when he was two months old, his parents settled in his father's city, Constanța. He started playing football at age 7, at FC Constanța's youth center where he worked with coach Iosif Bükössy. He made his Divizia A debut for the senior team when he played a full match at the age of 15 years, five months and 16 days on 16 March 1977 under coach Gheorghe Ola in a 1–0 loss to Steaua București. In the beginning of 1980, Zamfir went to play for Dinamo București, a team with which he won The Double in the 1981–82 season, being used by coach Valentin Stănescu in nine league matches. With Dinamo he also played his only game in a European competition, a 3–0 victory against Levski Sofia in the 1981–82 UEFA Cup. In 1982 he played for Dinamo's rival, Steaua, after which he joined Argeș Pitești for six seasons. In the following years of his career, Zamfir went to play for Gloria Bistrița, and also had experiences playing abroad in Turkey and Israel. He ended his career as a player-coach at Flacăra Moreni.

== International career ==
Zamfir was selected by coach Constantin Cernăianu to be part of Romania's under-20 squad for the 1981 World Youth Championship held in Australia. He appeared in five games, scoring once in a 1–1 draw against Brazil in the group stage, helping the team finish the tournament in third position, winning the bronze medal. Although defection from the Socialist Republic of Romania was illegal at that time, Zamfir decided to remain in Australia after the tournament, but eventually he willingly returned to the country.

== Death ==
Zamfir died on 6 October 2023, at the age of 62.

== Honours ==
Dinamo București

- Divizia A: 1981–82
- Cupa României: 1981–82
