= Cornel Mirea =

Romanian footballer (born 1963)

Personal information
- Date of birth: 20 August 1963 (age 63)
- Place of birth: Bucharest, PR Romania
- Height: 1.77 m (5 ft 10 in)
- Positions: Midfielder; defender

Senior career*
Years	Team	Apps	(Gls)
1982–1989	Victoria București (Note: The statistics for the 1982–83, 1983–84 and 1984–85 seasons are unavailable.)	138	(4)
1990	Dinamo București	12	(0)
1990–1992	Steaua București	33	(1)
1992–1993	Progresul București	26	(0)
1993–1994	Argeș Pitești	33	(4)
1995	Dinamo București	9	(0)
1995	Sportul Studențesc București	6	(0)
1996	Inter Sibiu	9	(0)
1996–1997	Rocar București	9	(0)
Total		275	(9)

International career
1981	Romania U18	1	(0)
1984–1987	Romania U21	3	(0)
1988	Romania Olympic	6	(0)
- * Club domestic league appearances and goals

Cornel Mirea (born 20 August 1963) is a Romanian former footballer who played as a midfielder and defender.

== Honours ==
Victoria București

- Divizia B: 1984–85

Dinamo București

- Divizia A: 1989–90

Steaua București

- Cupa României: 1991–92

Argeș Pitești

- Divizia B: 1993–94
