= Emil Ursu =

Romanian footballer

Personal information
- Date of birth: 14 January 1964 (age 62)
- Place of birth: Tecuci, Teleorman County, Romania
- Height: 1.77 m (5 ft 10 in)
- Position: Central midfielder

Senior career*
| Years | Team | Apps | (Gls) |
| 1984–1989 | Victoria București (Note: The statistics for the 1984–85 Divizia B season are unavailable.) | 109 | (6) |
| 1990 | SC Bacău | 15 | (1) |
| 1990–1992 | Argeș Pitești | 38 | (6) |
| 1992–1993 | Progresul București | 31 | (0) |
| 1993–1995 | Unirea Alba Iulia | 40 | (3) |
| 1995–1997 | Dunărea Călărași | 29 | (0) |
| Total | | 262 | (16) |

Managerial career
- 2002–2003: Poiana Câmpina
- 2003–2006: Poiana Câmpina
- 2008: Dinamo București II
- 2010: Astra Giurgiu II
- 2011: FCM Alexandria
- 2012: ACS Buftea
- 2012–2013: Ștefănești
- 2016: Concordia Chiajna II
- 2016: Concordia Chiajna (caretaker)
- 2018: Balotești
- 2019: ACS FC Dinamo
- 2020–2022: Dinamo II București
- * Club domestic league appearances and goals

Emil Ursu (born 14 January 1964) is a Romanian football manager and former player. Most recently, he was the head coach of Liga III side Dinamo II București.

In his playing career, he played as a midfielder.

After he ended his playing career he worked as a manager, mainly at teams from the Romanian lower leagues, with a short spell in the first league at Concordia Chiajna.

== Honours ==
=== Player ===
Victoria București

- Divizia B: 1984–85
