= 1993 Cupa României final =

- Event: 1992–93 Cupa României
FC U Craiova	Dacia Unirea Brăila
Divizia A	Divizia A
2	0
- Date: 26 June 1993
- Venue: Stadionul Naţional, Bucharest
- Referee: Mircea Salomir (Romania)
- Attendance: 10,000

The 1993 Cupa României final was the 55th final of Romania's most prestigious cup competition. The final was played at the Stadionul Naţional in Bucharest on 26 June 1993 and was contested between Divizia A sides FC U Craiova and Dacia Unirea Brăila. The cup was won by FC U Craiova.

== Route to the final ==
Universitatea Craiova

Round of 32	Venus Lugoj	0–6	FC U Craiova
Round of 16	FC U Craiova	1–0 a.e.t.	CSM Reșița
Quarter-finals 1st Leg	FC U Craiova	2–0	Universitatea Cluj
Quarter-finals 2nd Leg	Universitatea Cluj	3–2 (3–4 on Agg.)	FC U Craiova
Semi-finals 1st Leg	FC U Craiova	1–0	Gloria Bistriţa
Semi-finals 2nd Leg	Gloria Bistriţa	1–1 a.e.t. (1–2 on Agg.)	FC U Craiova

Dacia Unirea Brăila

Round of 32	Steaua Mizil	0–1	Dacia Unirea Brăila
Round of 16	Dacia Unirea Brăila	1–0	Minerul Motru
Quarter-finals 1st Leg	Dacia Unirea Brăila	1–0	FC Brașov
Quarter-finals 2nd Leg	FC Braşov	1–1 (1–2 on Agg.)	Dacia Unirea Brăila
Semi-finals 1st Leg	Dacia Unirea Brăila	3–2	FC Maramureş Baia Mare
Semi-finals 2nd Leg	FC Maramureş Baia Mare	1–1 (3–4 on Agg.)	Dacia Unirea Brăila

== Match details ==
26 June 1993
17:00 EET

FC U Craiova	2–0	Dacia Unirea Brăila
Vasc 81'; Craioveanu 88'	Report

Stadionul Naţional, Bucharest
Attendance: 10,000
Referee: Mircea Salomir (Romania)

FC U Craiova	Dacia Unirea Brăila

UNIVERSITATEA CRAIOVA:
GK	1	(Romania) Silviu Lung
DF	2	(Romania) Daniel Mogoşanu
DF	4	(Romania) Nicolae Zamfir
DF	5	(Romania) Emil Săndoi (c)	(substituted off) 85'
DF	3	(Romania) Victor Cojocaru
MF	7	(Romania) Silvian Cristescu	(substituted off) 70'
MF	6	(Romania) Corneliu Papură
MF	10	(Romania) Ovidiu Stângă
MF	11	(Romania) Cristian Vasc
FW	9	(Romania) Ionel Gane
FW	8	(Romania) Eugen Neagoe
Substitutes:
FW	16	(Romania) Gheorghe Craioveanu	(substituted on) 70'
DF	14	(Romania) Dumitru Predoi	(substituted on) 85'
Manager:
(Romania) Marian Bondrea

DACIA UNIREA BRĂILA:
GK	1	(Romania) Cătălin Hăisan
DF	6	(Romania) Adrian Baldovin
DF	5	(Romania) Vasile Brătianu
DF	7	(Romania) Vasilică Darie (c)
DF	2	(Romania) Sandu Minciu
MF	3	(Romania) Tudorel Pelin
MF	8	(Romania) Lucian Măstăcan		(substituted off) 83'
MF	4	(Romania) Marin Petrache
MF	11	(Romania) Ionel Drăgoi
FW	10	(Romania) Vasile Matincă	(red card) 90'
FW	9	(Albania) Arben Minga		(substituted off) 85'
Substitutes:
FW	16	(Romania) Marian Lazăr		(substituted on) 85'
FW	15	(Romania) Gheorghe Negoiţă		(substituted on) 83'
FW	14	(Romania) Marius Şumudică
Manager:
(Romania) Ioan Sdrobiş

MATCH OFFICIALS

- Assistant referees:
  - (Romania) Vasile Angheloiu
  - (Romania) Ilie Coţ
- Fourth official:

MAN OF THE MATCH

MATCH RULES

- 90 minutes.
- 30 minutes extra-time (15 minute intervals)
- Penalty shoot-out if scores level after extra time.
- Seven named substitutes
- Maximum of 3 substitutions.
