= Victor Cojocaru =

Romanian footballer

Personal information
- Date of birth: 1 May 1959 (age 67)
- Place of birth: Stoina, Romania
- Position: Right back

Senior career*
Years	Team	Apps	(Gls)
1980–1987	CSM Reșița		
1987–1989	Victoria București	69	(5)
1990–1991	Universitatea Craiova	30	(0)
1991	Electroputere Craiova	23	(0)
1992–1994	Universitatea Craiova	66	(0)
1995	Electroputere Craiova	8	(1)
Total		196	(6)
- * Club domestic league appearances and goals

Victor Cojocaru (born 1 May 1959) is a Romanian former footballer who played as a right defender.

== Career ==
Cojocaru was born on 1 May 1959 in Stoina, Romania, but his family moved to Reșița while he was a child. In 1980, his football talent was noticed by Mircea Secoșan, who brought him to Divizia B club CSM Reșița. He joined Victoria București, making his Divizia A debut on 23 August 1987 under coach Nicolae Dumitru in a 1–1 draw against Politehnica Timișoara. During his years spent with Victoria, Cojocaru played 14 matches and scored two goals in European competitions over the course of three seasons. Notably, while working with coach Florin Halagian, he played eight matches and scored a brace against Sliema Wanderers in the 1988–89 UEFA Cup campaign, helping the team reach the quarter-finals where they were defeated by Dynamo Dresden.

In the middle of the 1989–90 season, Cojocaru joined Universitatea Craiova. There, he had to play as a left defender because his usual position on the right was occupied by Vasile Mănăilă. He made 16 league appearances under coach Sorin Cârțu in the 1990–91 season to help the team win The Double. However, he did not play in the 2–0 victory against FC Bacău in the 1991 Cupa României final. Afterwards, Cojocaru spent a brief period playing for Electroputere Craiova, prior to making his return to Universitatea. He played eight matches for "U" Craiova in European competitions across three seasons, including helping the club eliminate HB Tórshavn before they were defeated by Paris Saint-Germain in the 1993–94 European Cup Winners' Cup. Subsequently, Cojocaru helped "U" win the 1992–93 Cupa României, playing the entire match under coach Marian Bondrea in the 2–0 victory against Dacia Unirea Brăila in the final. The team reached another cup final in 1994, but this time Bondrea did not use him in the 1–0 loss to Gloria Bistrița. Midway through the 1994–95 season, he made a comeback to Electroputere but was unable to help the team avoid relegation. Cojocaru made his last Divizia A appearance on 17 June 1995 in Electroputere's 5–4 victory against his former club Universitatea, totaling 196 matches with six goals in the competition.

== Honours ==
Universitatea Craiova

- Divizia A: 1990–91
- Cupa României: 1990–91, 1992–93, runner-up 1993–94
