= FCM Câmpina =

- Full name: Fotbal Club Municipal Câmpina
- Short name: Câmpina
- Founded: 1936
- Dissolved: 2008
- Ground: Poiana
- Capacity: 4,000
| Home colours | Away colours |

FCM Câmpina was a Romanian football team from Poiana Câmpina, Prahova County founded in 1936 and dissolved in 2008.

== History ==
The team was founded under the name Astra Câmpina, which was a local factory that was sponsoring the team. Later the team changed its name to Poiana Câmpina.

Even though the team is now called FCM Câmpina (Municipal Football Club Câmpina), most of its fans still call the team "Poiana" or "Poieniţa", a diminutive. Furthermore, FCM Câmpina used to be, for a couple of years, Dinamo Bucharest's second team, and was back then called Dinamo Poiana Câmpina. During this affiliation, football lovers from Câmpina were able to see playing for the local team famous players who were on loan from Dinamo: Ianis Zicu, Ionel Danciulescu, Vlad Munteanu, Cristian Pulhac and others, players that have several selections in the national team.

The most important player to have been developed by FCM Câmpina is Daniel Costescu, who played for first division clubs like Petrolul Ploieşti, FC Argeş Piteşti or Ceahlăul Piatra Neamţ, scoring 44 goals in 222 matches in the first division, and 21 goals in 67 matches in the second division.

On August 5, 2008, chairman Chiţu announced that the team has been dissolved and he does not wish to play any further part in Câmpina's football, thus destroying a football club with 72 years of tradition.

== Chronology of names ==
| Name | Period |
|---|---|
| Astra Română Poiana Câmpina | 1936–1950 |
| Flacăra Poiana Câmpina | 1950–1952 |
| Metalul Poiana Câmpina | 1953–1954 |
| Flacăra Poiana Câmpina | 1954–1956 |
| Energia Poiana Câmpina | 1956–1958 |
| FCM Poiana Câmpina | 1958–2008 |

== Honours ==
Liga II:

- Runners-up (2): 1955, 1961–62

Liga III:

- Winners (6): 1946–47, 1977–78, 1985–86, 1987–88, 1993–94, 2004–05
- Runners-up (6): 1973–74, 1974–75, 1981–82, 1986–87, 1991–92, 2002–03

Ploiești Regional Championship

- Winners (1): 1951

== Notable players ==
- (Romania) Ianis Zicu
- (Romania) Vlad Munteanu
- (Romania) Cristian Pulhac
- (Romania) Daniel Costescu
- (Romania) Iulian Mitea
- (Romania) Adrian Toader
- (Romania) Alexandru Bălțoi
- (Romania) Ion Zaharia

== Former managers ==
- (Romania) Ion Bălănescu (1945–1947)
- (Romania) Nicolae Petrescu (1948–1952)
- (Romania) Gheorghe Bărbulescu (1952–1953)
- (Romania) Gheorghe Petrescu (1963–1966)
- (Romania) Gheorghe Mulțescu (1991–1992)
- (Romania) Costel Orac (2000–2001)
- (Romania) Marin Dragnea (2001–2002)
- (Romania) Alexandru Moldovan (2002)
- (Romania) Iulian Mihăescu (2002)
- (Romania) Emil Ursu (2002–2003)
- (Romania) Cornel Țălnar (2003)
- (Romania) Emil Ursu (2003–2006)
- (Romania) Ștefan Nanu (2005–2007)
- (Romania) Imilian Șerbănică (2007–2008)
- (Romania) Gabriel Stan (2008)
- (Romania) Vasile Cosarek (2008)
- (Romania) Petre Gigiu (2008)
- (Romania) Nicolae Babeti
