= Nicolae Petrescu (footballer) =

Romanian footballer and manager

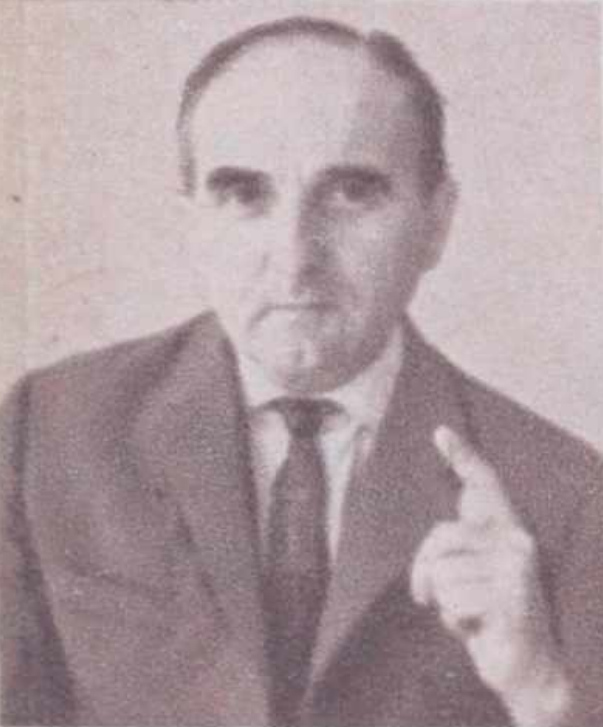
- Petrescu in 1966

Personal information
- Full name: Nicolae "Nicky" Petrescu
- Date of birth: 2 April 1913
- Place of birth: Bucharest, Romania
- Date of death: 1991 (aged 77–78)
- Position: Midfielder

Senior career*
| Years | Team | Apps | (Gls) |
| 1931–1941 | Juventus București | 144 | (0) |

Managerial career
- 1945: Juventus București
- 1946–1948: Juventus București (assistant)
- 1948–1952: Poiana Câmpina
- 1952: Vulcan București
- 1953–1957: Romania youth
- 1956: Romania U21
- 1957: Romania (assistant)
- 1957–1958: CCA București
- 1958–1960: Dinamo Obor București
- 1964–1968: Romania U21
- 1971: Turkey
- 1972–1973: Altay
- 1977–1978: Samsunspor
- * Club domestic league appearances and goals

Nicolae "Nicky" Petrescu (2 April 1913 – 1991) was a Romanian professional footballer and football manager.

== Playing career ==
Petrescu was born on 2 April 1913 in Bucharest, Romania and spent his entire playing career at local club Juventus. He made his debut for the club in the last round of the 1930–31 București championship when coach Emerich Vogl used him the entire match in a 9–0 victory against Sportul Studențesc București. In the following years, Petrescu started to play more often, consolidating his place in the team's starting XI, helping it gain promotion to Divizia A at the end of the 1932–33 season. His style of play was praised by the Gazeta Sporturilor newspaper after a 3–2 victory against Sportul Studențesc:"Insistent attacks started from the ranks of The Black and Whites (Sportul) are hardly stopped by the defense of The Red and Blues (Juventus). Petrescu is at ease, moving like a swashbuckler among his opponents, whom he regularly deprives of the ball". In the first round of the following season, he made his Divizia A debut on 17 September 1933 when coach Ladislau Csillag used him the full 90 minutes of a 3–1 away win over Ripensia Timișoara. He scored his first and only goal of his career in the round of 16 in the 1935–36 Cupa României in a 3–1 victory against Maccabi București, Juventus managing to reach the semi-finals of that edition, a performance which was repeated in the following season. In the last years of his career, Petrescu played more rarely and the team's results were poorer season after season, eventually being relegated by the end of the 1939–40 season. Petrescu stayed with the club and helped it get promoted after one season by contributing with 14 appearances. However, he did not get to play again in the first league as the championship was interrupted due to World War II, thus ending his playing career in which he gained a total of 107 Divizia A appearances and 16 matches with one goal in the Cupa României.

== Managerial career ==
Petrescu began his managerial career at the club he spent his entire playing career, Juventus București, guiding it during the first half of the 1945–46 București championship, before being replaced in the second half with Emerich Vogl who kept him on his staff as an assistant. He continued to work as an assistant for the following two seasons when the team played in Divizia A. Afterwards he worked at Poiana Câmpina and Vulcan București. Subsequently, Petrescu was employed by the Romanian Football Federation to coach Romanian youth teams from 1953 until 1957, including the under-21 side, and also in 1957 he was Gheorghe Popescu's assistant at the senior squad. From 1957 until 1958 he was head coach at CCA București, then moved to Dinamo Obor București for two years, after which he came back to working with juniors, being the coordinator coach of Dinamo București's youth center. In the following years, Petrescu continued to work at youth level, serving between 1962 and 1964 as the head of the "23 August" junior center and from 1964 until 1968 he coached Romania's under-21 team. For a short period he retired from the field and became head of the Psychological Research Laboratory at the Physical Education and Sports Research Center. In 1969, Petrescu returned to work for the Romanian Football Federation as a federal coach for one year. In 1971 he went to work in Turkey as a technical director for the Turkish Football Federation, and was later named the head coach of the national team for one game, a 1–0 home victory against Poland in the Euro 1972 qualifiers. In 1972 he went to coach Altay until 1973, and then returned to Romania where he held the position of president of the Central College of Coaches within the Romanian Football Federation from 1974 until 1976. In his final years of coaching, Petrescu worked from 1976 until 1977 as the coordinator of Dinamo București's youth center and had another experience in Turkey at Samsunspor, ending his career in 1978.

== Publications ==
Petrescu wrote two volumes about football:

- Carte pentru fotbaliștii de mâine (Book for tomorrow's footballers)
- Fotbal pe culmile performanței (Football at the peak of performance)

== Death ==
Petrescu died in 1991 at age 78.

== Honours ==
=== Player ===
Juventus București

- Divizia B: 1940–41
