= Ionel Augustin =

Romanian footballer

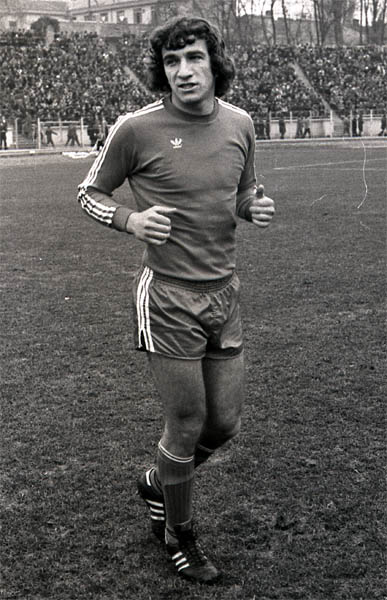

Personal information
- Date of birth: 11 October 1955 (age 71)
- Place of birth: Bucharest, Romania
- Height: 1.76 m (5 ft 9 1/2 in)
- Position: Striker

Youth career
- 1966–1974: Dinamo București

Senior career*
Years	Team	Apps	(Gls)
1974–1985	Dinamo București	267	(87)
1976–1977	→ Jiul Petroșani (loan)	30	(5)
1986–1988	Victoria București	78	(18)
1988–1989	Rapid București	8	(1)
1989	Chimia Râmnicu Vâlcea	20	(6)
1989–1990	Unirea Slobozia	7	(1)
Total		410	(118)

International career
1978–1986	Romania	34	(3)

Managerial career
- 1992–1994: Dinamo București (assistant)
- 1994: ARO Câmpulung Muscel (assistant)
- 1995–1996: Dinamo București (assistant)
- 1996–1997: Romania U16 (assistant)
- 1997–1998: Dinamo București (assistant)
- 1998–2002: ARO Câmpulung Muscel
- 2002: Dinamo București (assistant)
- 2002–2003: Dacia Unirea Brăila
- 2003: Gloria Buzău
- 2003–2004: ARO Câmpulung Muscel
- 2004–2005: Unirea Focșani
- 2005: Romania U17 (assistant)
- 2005: Dinamo București (assistant)
- 2006: Dinamo București (assistant)
- 2006–2007: Juventus București
- 2007: Unirea Focșani
- 2007–2008: Dinamo București II
- 2009–2010: Juventus București
- 2010: Dinamo București II
- 2010: Minerul Lupeni
- 2010–2011: Phoenix Ulmu
- 2011: CS Buftea
- 2011: Phoenix Ulmu
- 2011–2012: Viitorul Chirnogi
- 2012–2013: Romania U18
- 2013: Romania U19
- * Club domestic league appearances and goals

Ionel Augustin (born 11 October 1955) is a Romanian retired footballer who played as a striker.

== Club career ==
Augustin, nicknamed Oneață, was born on 11 October 1955 in Bucharest, Romania and began playing junior-level football in 1966 at Dinamo București. In the summer of 1973, he helped the team win the national junior championship. He made his Divizia A debut for the senior squad on 23 April 1975 in a 5–0 victory against Chimia Râmnicu Vâlcea, winning the title in his first season spent at the club, coach Nicolae Dumitru giving him a total of five appearances. For the 1976–77 season, Augustin went to Jiul Petroșani in order to play more often. On 17 October 1976, he scored his first Divizia A goal in Jiul's 4–0 home win over ASA Târgu Mureș.

Afterwards, Augustin returned to Dinamo where for several years he would form a successful offensive trio with Gheorghe Mulțescu and Costel Orac, together being called "AMO" by the fans, a nickname inspired by the initials of their family names. From 1982 to 1984, he earned three consecutive Divizia A titles. In the first one, he played 31 matches under coach Valentin Stănescu, scoring seven goals. In the following two seasons, he worked once again with Dumitru who gave him 31 appearances each year, and Augustin scored 14 and 17 goals respectively, making these the most prolific seasons of his career. Augustin also won three Cupa României, but played in only one of the finals, the one in 1984 when coach Dumitru used him the entire match in the 2–1 win over rivals Steaua București. Over the years he scored two goals in the derby against Steaua in two 1–1 draws in the league. He made some notable performances with The Red Dogs in European competitions, such as helping the club eliminate Inter Milan by scoring one goal in the 4–3 victory on aggregate in the 1981–82 UEFA Cup. He also appeared in seven matches during the 1983–84 European Cup campaign, scoring three goals against Kuusysi Lahti, Dinamo Minsk, and Hamburg—the latter in a 3–0 first-leg victory that helped eliminate the title holders—before the team reached the semi-finals and were defeated by Liverpool.

In the middle of the 1985–86 season, Augustin went to play for Victoria București. In 1988, he joined Rapid București where on 11 December he made his last Divizia A appearance in a 2–0 victory against Argeș Pitești, totaling 383 matches with 111 goals in the competition and 33 games with 10 goals in European competitions. Augustin ended his career in 1990 after playing two seasons in Divizia B for Chimia Râmnicu Vâlcea and Unirea Slobozia.

== International career ==
Augustin played 34 matches and scored three goals for Romania, making his debut on 13 December 1978 under coach Ștefan Kovacs in a 2–1 friendly loss to Greece. He played two games in which he scored once in the Euro 1980 qualifiers. Subsequently, he appeared in the first leg of the 1977–80 Balkan Cup final, which ended in a 2–0 defeat to Yugoslavia, and he also played two matches in the 1982 World Cup qualifiers.

Augustin made six appearances during the successful Euro 1984 qualifiers, including a 1–0 victory against World Cup holders Italy. Afterwards he was selected by coach Mircea Lucescu to be part of the final tournament squad and played in a 1–0 loss to Portugal as the team did not get past the group stage. Then he played in a 3–2 loss to Northern Ireland in the 1986 World Cup qualifiers. His last two games played for the national team were friendly draws, a 1–1 and a 0–0 against Iraq, Augustin scoring Romania's goal in the first one.

== Managerial career ==
Augustin began his coaching career at Dinamo București in 1992 as an assistant to Florin Halagian. In his early years of coaching, he had multiple tenures as assistant for Dinamo, and also for Romania's under-16 national team and ARO Câmpulung Muscel. In 1998, Augustin was named head coach at ARO Câmpulung Muscel in Divizia B, managing a second-place finish in the 1999–2000 season. In the following years, he continued to work for teams in the Romanian lower leagues such as Dacia Unirea Brăila, Gloria Buzău, Unirea Focșani, Juventus București, Dinamo București II, Minerul Lupeni, Phoenix Ulmu, CS Buftea and Viitorul Chirnogi. From 2012 to 2013, Augustin successively coached Romania's under-18 and under-19 national teams.

== Career statistics ==
=== International ===
Appearances and goals by national team and year
National team	Year	Apps	Goals
Romania
Romania	1978	1	0
Romania	1979	3	1
Romania	1980	2	0
Romania	1981	3	0
Romania	1982	8	1
Romania	1983	11	0
Romania	1984	3	0
Romania	1985	1	0
Romania	1986	2	1
Total		34	3

Scores and results list Romania's goal tally first, score column indicates score after each Augustin goal.

List of international goals scored by Ionel Augustin
#	Date	Venue	Cap	Opponent	Score	Result	Competition
1.	13 May 1979	Tsirion Stadium, Limassol, Cyprus	2	Cyprus	1–1	1–1	Euro 1980 qualifiers
2.	18 May 1982	Estadio Nacional de Chile, Ñuñoa, Chile	15	Chile	3–0	3–2	Friendly
3.	14 March 1986	Al-Shaab Stadium, Baghdad, Iraq	33	Iraq	1–0	1–1	Friendly

== Honours ==
Dinamo București

- Divizia A: 1974–75, 1981–82, 1982–83, 1983–84
- Cupa României: 1981–82, 1983–84, 1985–86
- Trofeo Costa de Valencia: 1978
