= Nicușor Vlad =

Romanian footballer

Personal information
- Date of birth: 12 June 1960 (age 66)
- Place of birth: Galați, Romania
- Position: Central defender

Senior career*
Years	Team	Apps	(Gls)
1977–1981	FCM Galați	114	(1)
1981–1983	Dinamo București	14	(1)
1983–1984	Corvinul Hunedoara	16	(0)
1984–1985	Dinamo București	17	(0)
1985–1987	Victoria București	54	(0)
1988	Rapid București	15	(0)
1989	Petrolul Ploiești		
Total		230	(2)

International career
1978	Romania U18	2	(0)
1979–1981	Romania U21	14	(0)
1976	Romania U23	1	(0)
- * Club domestic league appearances and goals

Nicușor Vlad (born 12 June 1960) is a Romanian former footballer who played as a central defender.

== Club career ==
Vlad was born on 12 June 1960 in Galați, Romania and began playing senior-level football in 1977 at local club FCM. He helped them earn promotion to the first league at the end of the 1978–79 season. Subsequently, he made his Divizia A debut on 12 August 1979, playing under coach Constantin Teașcă in a 3–1 loss to Politehnica Timișoara. The team was relegated at the end of the 1980–81 season.

In 1981, Vlad was transferred to Dinamo București together with teammate Costel Orac. In his first season, Dinamo won The Double under coach Valentin Stănescu, Vlad playing nine matches and scoring one goal in the league. During the same season, he played in both legs of the 4–2 aggregate win against Levski Sofia in the first round of the 1981–82 UEFA Cup. In the following season, the team won another title, but he played only five matches under coach Nicolae Dumitru. In the summer of 1983, Vlad, Florea Văetuș, Teofil Stredie and two other players were transferred from Dinamo to Corvinul in exchange for Mircea Rednic and Ioan Andone. After one year, he returned to Dinamo. He played in both legs in the first round of the 1984–85 European Cup, as the club eliminated Omonia Nicosia.

In 1985, Vlad went to play for Victoria București. Afterwards, he joined Rapid București and made his last Divizia A appearance on 20 November 1988 in a 1–0 victory against SC Bacău, totaling 177 matches with two goals in the competition. He ended his career after helping Petrolul Ploiești gain promotion to the first league at the end of the 1988–89 season.

== International career ==
From 1978 to 1981, Vlad was consistently featured for Romania's under-18, under-21 and under-23 sides.

== Honours ==
FCM Galați

- Divizia B: 1978–79

Dinamo București

- Divizia A: 1981–82, 1982–83
- Cupa României: 1981–82

Petrolul Ploiești

- Divizia B: 1988–89
