= Pompiliu Iordache =

Romanian footballer

Personal information
- Date of birth: 18 October 1954
- Place of birth: Râmnicu Sărat, Romania
- Date of death: 23 October 2006 (aged 52)
- Position: Forward

Youth career
- Foresta Gugești

Senior career*
Years	Team	Apps	(Gls)
1973–1979	Unirea Focșani (Note: Only statistics for the 1979–80 Divizia B season are available.)	14	(10)
1980–1983	Dinamo București	81	(15)
1983–1984	Olt Scornicești	21	(3)
1984–1987	Victoria București (Note: The statistics for the 1984–85 Divizia B season are unavailable.)	58	(18)
1988	Petrolul Ploiești	5	(0)
Total		179	(46)

International career
1983	Romania	2	(0)
- * Club domestic league appearances and goals

Pompiliu Iordache (18 October 1954 – 23 October 2006) was a Romanian football forward.

== Club career ==
Iordache was born on 18 October 1954 in Râmnicu Sărat, Romania and began playing football at Foresta Gugești. In 1973 he moved to Unirea Focșani where he played in Divizia C and Divizia B for about six years.

Iordache arrived at Dinamo București in 1980 where he was recommended by Titus Ozon. He made his Divizia A debut on 2 March, as coach Angelo Niculescu used him as a starter in a 2–1 away loss to Sportul Studențesc București. In the next round he netted his first goal in a 3–0 win over Olimpia Satu Mare. In the 1981–82 season, the club won The Double under coach Valentin Stănescu, Iordache playing 15 matches and scoring once in the league, also being used the entire match in the 3–2 victory over FC Baia Mare in the Cupa României final where he opened the score. In the same season he started to play in European competitions, making an appearance in a 1–0 home loss to IFK Göteborg in the round of 16 in the 1981–82 UEFA Cup. In the following season, Iordache was coached by Nicolae Dumitru, winning another title, scoring five goals in 26 matches. He also appeared in six games in the 1982–83 European Cup campaign as the club got past Vålerenga and Dukla Prague in the first rounds, being eliminated by Aston Villa after a 6–2 aggregate loss in which he scored once.

Iordache left Dinamo to go for the 1983–84 season to Olt Scornicești. In 1984 he joined Divizia B club, Victoria București which he helped earn promotion to the first league after one year by contributing with 10 goals under the guidance of coach Florin Cheran. In the 1986–87 season, he scored a personal record of 11 goals in the first league which helped Victoria earn a third place. Afterwards he played in both legs in the second round of the 1987–88 UEFA Cup as they lost 2–1 on aggregate to Dinamo Tbilisi. In the middle of the 1987–88 season, Iordache left Victoria to join Petrolul Ploiești where on 24 April 1988 he made his last Divizia A appearance in a 1–0 home victory against his former side, Olt Scornicești, totaling 165 matches with 36 goals in the competition.

== International career ==
Iordache played two friendly games for Romania, making his debut on 29 January 1983, being used as a starter by coach Mircea Lucescu in a 1–1 draw against Turkey. The second game took place a few days later and ended with a 3–1 away win over Greece, when he came as a substitute and replaced Romulus Gabor in the 57th minute.

== Death ==
Iordache died on 23 October 2006 at age 52.

== Honours ==
Unirea Focșani

- Divizia C: 1973–74, 1978–79

Dinamo București

- Divizia A: 1981–82, 1982–83
- Cupa României: 1981–82

Victoria București

- Divizia B: 1984–85
