= Claudiu Vaișcovici =

Romanian footballer

Personal information
- Date of birth: 14 October 1962 (age 64)
- Place of birth: Galați, Romania
- Position: Forward

Youth career
- CSȘ Pajura

Senior career*
Years	Team	Apps	(Gls)
1981	Sportul Studențesc	2	(0)
1983–1985	Dunărea Galați	41	(10)
1985–1987	Oțelul Galați	56	(20)
1987	Victoria București	15	(5)
1988–1990	Dinamo București	68	(58)
1990–1991	Bursaspor	8	(0)
1991	Zimbru Chișinău	24	(9)
1992	Progresul București		
1992–1993	Dunărea Galați	9	(1)
Total		223	(103)

International career
1986–1988	Romania Olympic	10	(2)
1987–1989	Romania	10	(0)
- * Club domestic league appearances and goals

Claudiu Vaișcovici (born 14 October 1962) is a Romanian former professional footballer who played as a forward.

== Club career ==
Vaișcovici was born on 14 October 1962 in Galați, Romania. He was brought to Sportul Studențesc București from junior club CSȘ Pajura, making his Divizia A debut on 4 April 1981 under coach Ion Voica in a 2–0 victory against Universitatea Craiova. Subsequently, he experienced some heart problems, which kept him off the field for two years until Ilie Hagioglu, the president of Divizia B club Dunărea Galați noticed him in a friendly and gave him the chance to play for his team. In 1985, he was transferred to neighboring team Oțelul which he helped gain promotion to the first league. In 1987, Vaișcovici went to play for Victoria București. There, he played four games in the 1987–88 UEFA Cup campaign as they got past EPA Larnaca in the first round, being eliminated in the following one by Dinamo Tbilisi against whom he scored a goal.

In the middle of the 1987–88 season, he was transferred to coach Mircea Lucescu's team Dinamo București in exchange for Marian Damaschin. There, in his first season he scored 22 goals in 16 league games, including six in a 9–1 victory against CSM Suceava and a brace in a 3–3 draw against rivals Steaua București. He played six matches in the 1988–89 European Cup Winners' Cup campaign, scoring two goals against Kuusysi Lahti and netting his side's only goal during their quarter-final elimination by Sampdoria on the away goals rule after a 1–1 aggregate draw. In the 1989–90 season, Dinamo won The Double with Vaișcovici scoring 14 goals in 21 league games, coach Lucescu also using him the entire match in the 6–4 win over Steaua in the Cupa României final. Additionally, the team reached the 1989–90 European Cup Winners' Cup semi-finals where they were eliminated after 2–0 on aggregate by Anderlecht, Vaișcovici playing eight games in the campaign. On 11 May 1991, Vaișcovici made his last Divizia A appearance in Dinamo's 1–1 draw against Universitatea Craiova, totaling 255 matches with 35 goals in the competition and 18 games with four goals in European competitions.

In August 1990, Vaișcovici went to play in Turkey for Bursaspor, where he became a teammate of compatriot Gheorghe Nițu and a young Hakan Şükür. He made his debut in the Turkish league on 26 August under coach Ion Nunweiller in a 2–0 loss to Sarıyer. Vaișcovici then joined Lică Movilă for the 1991 Soviet First League season at Zimbru Chișinău. Subsequently, he returned to Romania at Divizia B club Progresul București, helping them gain promotion to the first league at the end of the 1991–92 season. Vaișcovici remained in the second league, playing in his hometown for Dunărea Galați, retiring in 1993.

== International career ==
Between 1986 and 1988, Vaișcovici made several appearances for Romania's Olympic team.

Vaișcovici played 10 matches for Romania, making his debut on 8 April 1987 under coach Emerich Jenei in a 3–2 friendly victory against Israel. He played three games in the successful 1990 World Cup qualifiers, but was not selected to be part of the final tournament squad. Vaișcovici's last appearance for the national team occurred on 31 August 1989 in a 0–0 draw against Portugal.

== Honours ==
Dunărea Galați

- Divizia B: 1982–83

Oțelul Galați

- Divizia B: 1985–86

Dinamo București

- Divizia A: 1989–90
- Cupa României: 1989–90

Progresul București

- Divizia B: 1991–92
