= Laurențiu Moldovan =

Romanian footballer

Personal information
- Date of birth: 1 November 1959 (age 66)
- Position: Midfielder

Senior career*
Years	Team	Apps	(Gls)
1978–1979	CSM Borzești		
1979–1981	CS Bacău	41	(3)
1981–1983	Dinamo București	14	(0)
1983–1984	Corvinul Hunedoara	28	(2)
1984–1988	Universitatea Cluj	104	(9)
1989–1991	Unirea Alba Iulia (Note: The statistics for the 1989–90 and 1990–91 Divizia B seasons are unavailable.)	15	(2)
Total		202	(16)
- * Club domestic league appearances and goals

Laurențiu Moldovan (born 1 November 1959) is a Romanian former football midfielder.

== Honours ==
Dinamo București

- Divizia A: 1981–82, 1982–83
- Cupa României: 1981–82

Universitatea Cluj

- Divizia B: 1984–85
