= Dan Topolinschi =

Romanian footballer

Personal information
- Date of birth: 20 February 1966 (age 60)
- Place of birth: Iași, Romania
- Height: 1.75 m (5 ft 9 in)
- Position: Left back

Senior career*
Years	Team	Apps	(Gls)
1983–1985	Politehnica Iași	20	(0)
1985–1986	Dinamo București	14	(0)
1986–1989	Victoria București	61	(1)
1990–1991	Politehnica Iași		
1991–1992	Adana Demirspor	28	(3)
1992–1993	Bakırköyspor	18	(0)
1993–1994	Faur București	13	(3)
1994	Progresul București	8	(0)
1995	Sportul Studențesc București	2	(0)
1995–1996	Dunărea Călărași	10	(0)
Total		174	(7)

International career
1986–1987	Romania U21	6	(0)
- * Club domestic league appearances and goals

Dan Topolinschi (born 20 February 1966) is a Romanian former footballer who played as a left defender.

== Conviction ==
After he retired from playing football, Topolinschi settled in Călărași and worked as a police officer. In 2000 he was arrested for taking a bribe and was sentenced to two years in prison. Topolinschi claims he was wrongfully convicted.

== Honours ==
Dinamo București

- Cupa României: 1985–86
