= Vasile Cosarek =

Romanian footballer

Personal information
- Date of birth: 9 November 1951 (age 75)
- Place of birth: Ploiești, Romania
- Height: 1.68 m (5 ft 6 in)
- Position: Central midfielder

Youth career
- 1966–1970: Petrolul Ploiești

Senior career*
| Years | Team | Apps | (Gls) |
| 1970–1975 | Petrolul Ploiești | 70 | (5) |
| 1975 | Metalul Plopeni | | |
| 1976–1977 | Universitatea Cluj | 19 | (1) |
| 1977–1978 | Petrolul Ploiești | 13 | (0) |
| 1978–1980 | Poiana Câmpina | | |
| 1980–1983 | Petrolul Ploiești | 79 | (9) |
| 1984–1987 | Steaua II Bucuresti | | |
| Total | | 181 | (15) |

Managerial career
- Unirea Câmpina
- Petrolul Băicoi
- Metalul Filipeștii de Pădure
- Metalul Plopeni
- Petrolul Teleajen
- 2004–2005: Petrolul Ploiești
- 2005–2006: Petrolistul Boldești
- 2006–2007: Astra Ploiești
- 2007: Chimia Brazi
- 2008: FCM Câmpina
- 2008–2009: AFC Filipeștii de Pădure
- 2009: ASO Slănic
- 2010–2012: Astra III Giurgiu
- 2012: Astra II Giurgiu
- 2015: Gloria Gaz Metan Cornești
- * Club domestic league appearances and goals

Vasile Cosarek (born 9 November 1951) is a Romanian former footballer who played as a central midfielder. After he ended his playing career, he worked as a manager at teams from the Romanian lower leagues.

== Honours ==
=== Player ===
Petrolul Ploiești

- Divizia B: 1976–77
