= Gheorghe Nițu =

Romanian footballer

Personal information
- Date of birth: 19 November 1960 (age 65)
- Place of birth: Pitești, Romania
- Height: 1.87 m (6 ft 2 in)
- Position: Goalkeeper

Youth career
- Argeș Pitești

Senior career*
Years	Team	Apps	(Gls)
1980–1981	Argeș Pitești	5	(0)
1981–1983	Steaua București	24	(0)
1983–1985	Olt Scornicești	24	(0)
1985–1989	Victoria București	105	(0)
1990	Steaua București	7	(0)
1990–1992	Bursaspor	46	(0)
1992–1994	Farul Constanța	56	(0)
1995	Budapesti VSC	4	(0)
1995–1996	Electroputere Craiova	3	(0)
1996–1997	Ceahlăul Piatra Neamț	10	(0)
1997–1998	Sportul Studențesc București	2	(0)
1998–1999	Ceahlăul Piatra Neamț	2	(0)
Total		288	(0)

International career
1979–1980	Romania U21	4	(0)
1986–1988	Romania Olympic	4	(0)
- * Club domestic league appearances and goals

Gheorghe Nițu (born 19 November 1960) is a Romanian former footballer who played as a goalkeeper.

== Club career ==
Nițu was born on 19 November 1960 in Pitești, Romania and grew up admiring footballer Nicolae Dobrin. He began playing junior-level football at local club Argeș and helped the club win a national junior title in 1980. On 21 May 1980, he made his Divizia A debut under coach Florin Halagian, playing for Argeș alongside his idol Dobrin in a 1–0 away loss to SC Bacău.

In 1981, Nițu went to play at Steaua București for two years, moving afterwards to Olt Scornicești for another two-season spell. In 1985, he joined Victoria București where he played in a 0–0 draw against Dinamo Tbilisi in the second round of the 1987–88 UEFA Cup. In the next edition of the UEFA Cup, he played seven games under coach Halagian, as the team reached the quarter-finals where they were defeated by Dynamo Dresden. Midway through the 1989–90 season, he returned to Steaua.

In August 1990, Nițu went to play in Turkey for Bursaspor, where he became a teammate of compatriots Claudiu Vaișcovici and Mircea Rednic, and a young Hakan Şükür. His debut in the Turkish league took place on 26 August under coach Ion Nunweiller in a 2–0 loss to Sarıyer. Bursaspor reached the 1991–92 Turkish Cup final, where coach Yılmaz Vural used him in both legs of the 5–4 aggregate loss to Trabzonspor. Subsequently, he played in a 3–1 win over Fenerbahçe, as the team won the 1992 Prime Minister's Cup.

Nițu returned to Romania in 1992, playing for two and a half seasons at Farul Constanța. Afterwards, he moved to Hungarian side Budapesti VSC, where he became a teammate of fellow Romanian Viorel Vancea. Nițu managed to keep a clean sheet in his Nemzeti Bajnokság I debut, which took place on 30 April 1995 under coach Sándor Egervári in a 3–1 victory against Békéscsaba. For the 1995–96 season, he went to play for Divizia B club Electroputere Craiova. Afterwards, Nițu came back to Divizia A football by joining Ceahlăul Piatra Neamț. In the 1997–98 season, he played two matches for Sportul Studențesc București, as the club suffered relegation to the second league. Nițu then returned to Ceahlăul, where he made his last Divizia A appearance on 17 October 1998 in a 3–0 home loss to Steaua, totaling 235 matches in the competition.

== International career ==
From 1979 to 1980, Nițu played for Romania's under-21 team. Subsequently, between 1986 and 1988, he played another four matches for Romania's Olympic side.

== Coaching career ==
After he concluded his playing career, Nițu worked as a goalkeeper coach for various teams.

== Personal life ==
Nițu's sons, Radu and Andrei, were also footballers, with the first playing at Divizia B level and the second reaching Divizia A level.

== Honours ==
Bursaspor

- Prime Minister's Cup: 1992
- Turkish Cup runner-up: 1991–92
