= Florea Văetuș =

Romanian footballer

Personal information
- Date of birth: 23 November 1956 (age 69)
- Place of birth: Hunedoara, Romania
- Position: Striker

Youth career
- 1971–1974: Constructorul Hunedoara
- 1974–1975: Corvinul Hunedoara

Senior career*
Years	Team	Apps	(Gls)
1975–1976	Victoria Călan		
1976	Mureșul Deva		
1977–1981	Corvinul Hunedoara	154	(47)
1982–1983	Dinamo București	44	(12)
1983–1988	Corvinul Hunedoara	142	(27)
1990–1991	Metalurgistul Cugir		
Total		340	(86)

International career
1982–1984	Romania	7	(1)

Managerial career
- 2008: Corvinul Hunedoara
- * Club domestic league appearances and goals as of 26 January 2020

Florea Văetuș (born 23 November 1956) is a Romanian former footballer who played as a striker.

== Club career ==
Văetuș was born on 23 November 1956 in Hunedoara, Romania and began playing junior-level football at local clubs Constructorul and Corvinul. He started to play football at senior level in 1975 at Divizia B club Victoria Călan, after one year moving to Mureșul Deva. He was supposed to make his Divizia A debut by playing for Corvinul Hunedoara in a match against Sportul Studențesc București which was postponed due to the 1977 Vrancea earthquake. Thus on 20 March 1977, coach Ladislau Vlad gave him his debut in a 2–2 draw against Jiul Petroșani. Corvinul was relegated at the end of the 1978–79 season, but Văetuș stayed with the club, helping it get promoted back to the first division after one year by scoring 15 goals under coach Mircea Lucescu. In the middle of the 1981–82 season he was transferred to Dinamo București. In his first season, Dinamo won The Double under coach Valentin Stănescu, Văetuș playing 13 matches and scoring five goals in the league, also being used the entire match in the 3–2 victory over FC Baia Mare in the Cupa României final. In the following season, he was coached by Nicolae Dumitru and won another title, scoring seven goals in 31 matches. He also appeared in five games in the 1982–83 European Cup season as the club got past Vålerenga and Dukla Prague in the first rounds, being eliminated by Aston Villa after a 6–2 aggregate loss. In the summer of 1983, Văetuș, Nicușor Vlad, Teofil Stredie and two other players were transferred from Dinamo to Corvinul in exchange for Mircea Rednic and Ioan Andone. He played five seasons for Corvinul in his second spell, making his last Divizia A appearance on 22 June 1988 in a 2–1 loss to Rapid București, totaling 308 games with 71 goals in the competition. After he ended his playing career in 1991 at Divizia B team, Metalurgistul Cugir, Văetuș worked as a manager at teams from the Romanian lower leagues.

== International career ==
Văetuș played seven matches for Romania under coach Mircea Lucescu. He scored one goal in his debut, a 3–1 victory against Cyprus in the successful Euro 1984 qualifiers, but was not part of the squad that went to the final tournament. His following games were friendlies. He made his last appearance on 11 April 1984 in a 0–0 draw against Israel, when he came as a substitute to replace Nicolae Ungureanu in the 79th minute of the game.

=== International goals ===
Scores and results list Romania's goal tally first, score column indicates score after each Văetuș goal.

List of international goals scored by Florea Văetuș
#	Date	Venue	Cap	Opponent	Score	Result	Competition
1	1 May 1982	Stadionul Corvinul, Hunedoara, Romania	1	Cyprus	1–0	3–1	Euro 1984 qualifiers

== Honours ==
Corvinul Hunedoara

- Divizia B: 1979–80

Dinamo București

- Divizia A: 1981–82, 1982–83
- Cupa României: 1981–82
