= 1981–82 Divizia A =

64th season of top-tier football league in Romania

Divizia A
- Season: 1981–82
- Champions: Dinamo București
- Top goalscorer: Anghel Iordănescu (20)

The 1981–82 Divizia A was the sixty-fourth season of Divizia A, the top-level football league of Romania.

== Teams ==
Location of teams in 1981-82 Divizia A

== League table ==
Pos	Team	Pld	W	D	L	GF	GA	GD	Pts	Qualification or relegation
1	Dinamo București (C)	34	20	7	7	62	31	+31	47	Qualification to European Cup preliminary round
2	Universitatea Craiova	34	20	5	9	67	28	+39	45	Qualification to UEFA Cup first round
3	Corvinul Hunedoara	34	15	9	10	64	42	+22	39	Qualification to UEFA Cup first round
4	Olt Scornicești	34	17	5	12	48	41	+7	39	
5	Sportul Studenţesc București	34	12	14	8	36	36	0	38	
6	Steaua București	34	14	9	11	41	33	+8	37	
7	SC Bacău	34	11	11	12	40	47	−7	33	
8	Chimia Râmnicu Vâlcea	34	12	9	13	37	48	−11	33	
9	CS Târgoviște	34	12	9	13	30	43	−13	33	
10	Argeș Pitești	34	11	10	13	36	34	+2	32	
11	Politehnica Timișoara	34	12	8	14	40	41	−1	32	
12	Jiul Petroșani	34	11	10	13	40	43	−3	32	
13	FCM Brașov	34	13	6	15	31	40	−9	32	
14	FC Constanța	34	10	11	13	38	46	−8	31	
15	ASA Târgu Mureș	34	13	4	17	45	47	−2	30	
16	Universitatea Cluj (R)	34	11	8	15	34	49	−15	30	Relegation to Divizia B
17	UTA Arad (R)	34	10	9	15	33	40	−7	29	Relegation to Divizia B
18	Progresul București (R)	34	7	6	21	29	62	−33	20	Relegation to Divizia B

Source: LT
Rules for classification: 1) points; 2) goal difference; 3) number of goals scored
(C) Champions; (R) Relegated

=== Results ===
Home \ Away	ASA	ARG	BAC	BRA	CON	COR	UCR	DIN	JIU	OLT	PRO	RAM	SPO	STE	POL	TAR	UCL	UTA
ASA Târgu Mureș	—	1–0	2–1	0–1	3–0	4–0	0–2	1–0	4–0	1–1	3–0	2–0	4–0	1–1	2–1	2–0	3–0	3–0
Argeș Pitești	4–1	—	3–1	3–0	2–0	0–0	0–1	0–2	3–2	7–1	1–1	2–1	0–0	1–0	2–0	1–1	2–0	1–0
Bacău	1–0	0–0	—	2–0	2–2	3–3	0–0	1–1	3–1	2–1	1–1	1–0	1–1	1–1	2–0	0–0	3–1	3–0
Brașov	3–0	0–0	0–0	—	0–0	2–0	2–0	2–1	2–1	3–0	2–0	1–0	0–0	2–1	3–1	3–0	1–0	0–1
Constanța	4–1	1–1	0–1	3–0	—	1–1	1–1	1–3	3–1	0–0	3–1	4–0	0–0	1–0	1–0	2–0	2–0	0–0
Corvinul Hunedoara	5–1	2–0	4–2	3–0	5–0	—	1–1	2–1	5–0	3–1	7–1	5–1	1–0	1–0	3–2	1–1	1–1	3–1
Universitatea Craiova	5–0	1–0	4–1	2–1	3–2	2–0	—	2–0	1–0	4–1	4–0	5–0	4–0	1–1	5–0	4–0	4–1	3–1
Dinamo București	3–2	1–0	4–1	2–0	4–0	3–2	4–0	—	2–1	4–2	2–0	1–0	3–0	2–1	3–0	3–0	3–0	2–1
Jiul Petroșani	1–1	1–0	3–0	1–0	5–2	1–0	1–0	2–2	—	0–0	2–0	1–1	1–1	2–0	1–1	2–0	3–0	2–0
Olt Scornicești	1–0	3–0	2–0	3–0	2–0	2–0	1–4	3–0	1–0	—	1–0	1–1	3–1	1–0	2–0	1–0	3–0	4–0
Progresul București	2–0	0–0	1–3	3–0	1–1	0–1	2–1	1–3	0–0	1–3	—	0–1	1–2	0–2	2–0	1–0	1–0	2–0
Chimia Râmnicu Vâlcea	1–0	2–0	5–2	1–0	0–1	2–0	1–0	0–0	0–0	1–0	3–2	—	2–1	0–0	2–1	3–3	1–1	3–2
Sportul Studențesc București	1–0	1–1	1–0	2–0	0–0	1–0	2–0	1–1	3–3	3–0	3–1	1–0	—	1–0	1–1	2–0	1–1	1–0
Steaua București	4–1	3–0	2–0	2–1	2–1	2–1	1–0	0–0	1–0	2–1	2–2	3–2	1–1	—	1–1	1–1	4–1	1–0
Politehnica Timișoara	2–1	3–1	0–0	4–0	1–1	3–1	0–2	2–0	1–1	2–1	3–0	3–0	2–1	2–0	—	3–0	1–0	0–0
Târgoviște	1–0	1–0	2–0	3–1	2–1	1–1	1–0	1–1	2–0	2–1	1–0	0–0	2–2	1–0	1–0	—	3–0	0–1
Universitatea Cluj	1–1	1–1	1–2	0–0	1–0	1–1	3–1	2–1	3–1	0–0	3–1	3–1	2–0	2–0	1–0	1–0	—	3–1
UTA Arad	1–0	2–0	1–0	1–1	3–0	1–1	0–0	0–0	1–0	0–1	4–1	2–2	1–1	1–2	0–0	5–0	2–0	—

Source: LT (in Romanian)
Legend: Blue = home team win; Yellow = draw; Red = away team win.

== Top goalscorers ==
Position	Player	Club	Goals
1	Anghel Iordănescu	Steaua București	20
2	Sorin Cârţu	Universitatea Craiova	19
3	Sorin Gângu	Chimia Râmnicu Vâlcea	16
4	Gheorghe Iamandi	Olt Scorniceşti	14
5	Ioan Petcu	Corvinul Hunedoara	13

== Champion squad ==
Dinamo București

Goalkeepers: Constantin Eftimescu (6 / 0); Dumitru Moraru (31 / 0).
Defenders: Marin Ion (30 / 0); Nicușor Vlad (9 / 1); Adrian Bumbescu (23 / 0); Cornel Dinu (29 / 0); Gheorghe Dumitrescu (3 / 0); Teofil Stredie (25 / 2); Nelu Stănescu (28 / 0); Ioan Mărginean (6 / 1).
Midfielders: Ionel Augustin (31 / 7); Marin Dragnea (23 / 7); Gheorghe Mulțescu (26 / 9); Alexandru Custov (31 / 6); Laurențiu Moldovan (6 / 0).
Forwards: Cornel Țălnar (30 / 2); Pompiliu Iordache (15 / 1); Dudu Georgescu (24 / 11); Florea Văetuș (13 / 5); Costel Orac (32 / 9); Dorel Zamfir (9 / 0).
(league appearances and goals listed in brackets)

Manager: Valentin Stănescu.

== Attendances ==
No.	Club	Average
1	Craiova	21,882
2	Constanţa	16,588
3	Steaua	15,588
4	Dinamo 1948	13,882
5	Timişoara	13,559
6	Tārgovişte	13,235
7	U Cluj	12,882
8	Argeş	12,176
9	UTA Arad	11,765
10	Braşov	11,588
11	Hunedoara	10,765
12	Bacău	10,765
13	Progresul	9,912
14	Rāmnicu Vālcea	9,294
15	Tīrgu Mureş	8,588
16	Sportul Studenţesc	6,500
17	Jiul	5,353
18	Olt Scorniceşti	4,029

== See also ==
- 1981–82 Divizia B
- 1981–82 Divizia C
- 1981–82 County Championship
- 1981–82 Cupa României
