= Victoria București =

Association football club

- Full name: Asociația Sportivă Victoria București
- Nicknames: Azurii (The Azures); Victorienii (The Victorians)
- Short name: Victoria
- Founded: 1949
- Dissolved: 1990
- Ground: Victoria
- Capacity: 1,500

Asociația Sportivă Victoria București, commonly known as Victoria București or simply Victoria, was a Romanian football club based in Bucharest, founded in 1949 and dissolved right after the Romanian revolution of 1989.

The club was supported by the Romanian Ministry of Internal Affairs. For many years, Victoria competed in the lower divisions and went through several name changes, including Dinamo 6, Dinamo Obor, Pompierul, and Dinamo Victoria. During this period, as Dinamo Obor, the team achieved one of its most notable performances by becoming the sixth club from Divizia B to reach the Romanian Cup final, which it lost 0–2 against Progresul București.

After earning promotion to the Romanian top division in 1985 as Dinamo Victoria, the team changed its name to Victoria București the following season and quickly emerged as one of the league’s strongest sides, finishing 3rd from 1987 to 1989, behind Steaua and Dinamo București, and playing four Romanian Cup semifinals.

However, it was a well-known fact during that time that many victories were due to unfair influences over the referees, other teams' players and even officials. Consequently, in January 1990, the Romanian Football Federation dissolved the team and officially ceased the club’s operations.

== History ==
The team was founded in 1949 in the Obor neighborhood of Bucharest, under the authority of the Romanian Ministry of Internal Affairs through the Bucharest General Directorate of Police, known at the time as the 'Miliția', as a satellite branch of Dinamo București, initially named Dinamo 6.

Starting in 1951, the team was led by Sebastian Taciuc, who remained at the helm until 1958. Under his guidance, Dinamo 6 earned promotion to Divizia B at the end of the 1953 season.

During three seasons in the second division as Dinamo 6, the team placed 9th in Series II in 1954, improved to 6th in Series I in 1955 while reaching the Round of 16 in the Cupa României, losing 0–1 to Metalul Câmpia Turzii, and finished 4th in Series II in 1956, again making it to the Round of 16 of the Cupa României before suffering a 0–5 loss to Locomotiva București. In 1957, the club was renamed Dinamo Obor and ended the 1957–58 season 5th in Series II, and also qualified for the Round of 16 in the Cupa României, suffering a 1–2 defeat to Rapid București. The formation lineup comprised Datcu — Szabo, Nacu, Dănulescu — Gref, Barcu — Sitaru, Mureșan, Voica, Szekely, Pripas.

In 1958, the club underwent another name change, becoming Pompierul, with Nicolae Petrescu appointed as head coach. Under his leadership, the team competed in Series II, finishing 6th in the 1958–59 season and as runners-up in the 1959–60 season, during which it reverted to the name Dinamo Obor. That same season, the team also had a remarkable run in the Cupa României, eliminating Voința Târgu Mureș (3–2) in the Round of 32, Rapid București (1–0) in the Round of 16, Minerul Lupeni (3–1) in the quarter-finals, and Știința Timișoara (4–2 after extra time) in the semi-final, before falling 0–2 to Progresul București in the final. Coached by Constantin Teașcă, the lineup featured Ilie Datcu, Buzeșan, Kurt Gross, Olteanu, Stoica, Constantin Ștefan, Buzatu, I. Niculescu, Filip Staudt, Alexandru Vâlcov and Tiberiu Selymesi.

Continuing in Divizia B, Dinamo Obor finished 6th in the 1960–61 season, with Constantin Teașcă as head coach, 3rd in 1961–62, and 11th in Series I of the 1962–63 season, resulting in relegation to the newly re-established Divizia C.

Renamed Dinamo Victoria, the team competed in the South Series of Divizia C, where it finished 3rd in the 1963–64 season and also qualified for the Round of 32 in the Cupa României, where it was narrowly beaten 1–2 by Știința Timișoara. The team secured promotion back to Divizia B after winning the series in 1964–65 under the leadership of Gheorghe Timar.

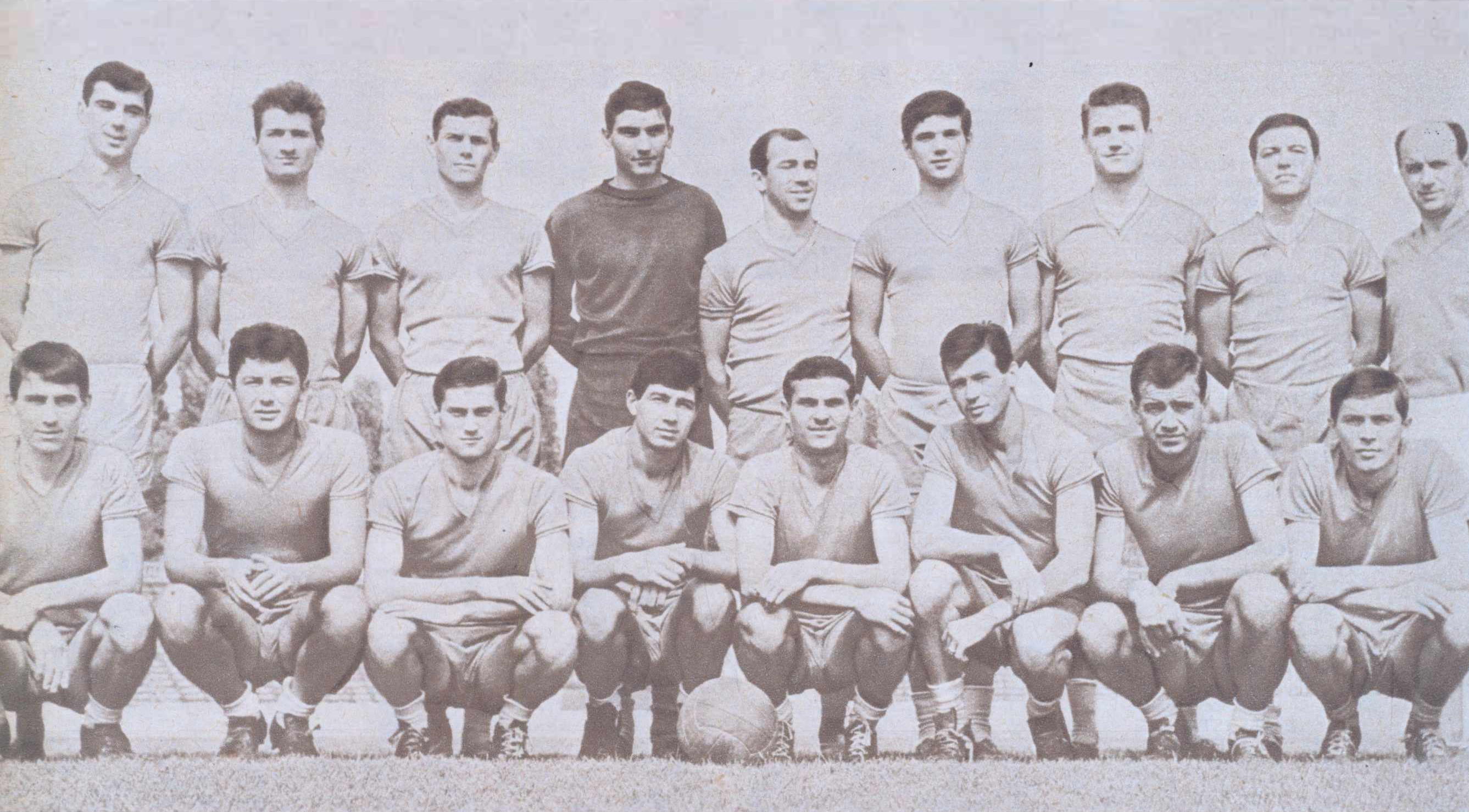
Dinamo Victoria București in the 1966–67 season.

In the second division, Dinamo Victoria played in Series I with Nicolae Dumitru as head coach, ranking 8th in the 1965–66 season and 4th in the 1966–67 season. The team included players such as Vasile Stan, Ștefan Feodot, Horia Ghibănescu, Radu Jercan and Ion Ștefan. In 1967, Dinamo Victoria București gave away its place in the second division to Viitorul Electronica București, a team from the Bucharest Municipal Championship, which was subsequently renamed Electronica Obor București.

The club was later reorganized under the name Dinamo Obor in the third category of the Bucharest Municipal Championship, the sixth tier of the Romanian football league system. After two seasons, the team returned to the first municipal category, finishing 6th in the 1960–70 season. In the 1970–71 season, it won the Bucharest Municipal Championship and earned promotion to Divizia C. In the third division, Dinamo Obor finished 11th in Series IV and 12th in Series V, before giving up its place in Divizia C to Triumf București, a team from the second category of the Bucharest Municipal Championship, and was once again reorganized in the lower divisions of the municipal system under the name Dinamo Victoria.

In the 1980–81 season, Dinamo Victoria earned promotion to Divizia C under the leadership of Ștefan Feodot, winning the Municipal Championship and the promotion play-off against CFR Constanța (3–2 away and 5–2 at home), the winner of the Constanța County Championship. In the 1981–82 season, Dinamo Victoria won Series V of the third division and returned, after fifteen years, to Divizia B. The squad, led by Constantin Frățilă and Ștefan Feodot as assistant, was composed of players including I. Anuței, Dinu, Nedelcu, C. Adolf, Ad. Bădilaș, Fl. Popicu, E. Frîncu, Stănescu, Lucuță, Beschea, Grigoraș, Costache, Al. Moldovan, Brumaru, Cojocaru, I. Mitracu, Leon Săndoi, Frățilă II, Iordache, Gh. Radu, Niculcioiu, Ciocănete, S. Răducanu and Ciornoavă.

In the second division, Dinamo Victoria had a convincing campaign under coach Constantin Teașcă, establishing itself among the top teams in Series II, the squad being strengthened from the previous year by players such as C. Ștefan, Fl. Cheran, N. Glonț and C. Mirea, ranking 2nd in the 1982–83 season. In the 1983–84 season, Dinamo Victoria continued to maintain a top position in the standings, finishing 3rd in Series II, with new players joining the team including Ivan, Manu, Guda, M. Nedelcearu, Popazu, Lupu, Ursu, V. Aelenei, Gh. Dumitrescu, Vasile, Stredie, Brumaru, and Scripcaru.

In the 1984–85 season, Florin Cheran took over as head coach and, with a squad that included new arrivals C. Eftimescu, Ov. Barba, Al. Custov and P. Iordache, achieved promotion to Divizia A for the first time in the club’s history by winning Series II with a ten-point margin ahead of Șoimii IPA Sibiu and Progresul Vulcan București.

The debut in the Romanian top flight took place in front of 20,000 spectators at the Dinamo Stadium, with Victoria holding Universitatea Craiova to a 1–1 draw. Head coach Ion Nunweiller fielded the lineup Eftimescu – Manu, Brumaru, Mirea, Vlad – Săndoi (72' Moldovan), Ursu, Custov – Iordache (69' Aelenei), Glonț, and Viorel Radu. However, the campaign proved challenging, as Victoria barely avoided relegation, finishing in 12th place, just two points above the first relegation spot. In the Cupa României, Victoria qualified for the semifinals, where it suffered a 2–4 defeat against Dinamo București. The lineup included Zlotea – Vlad (46' Săndoi), Cățoi (46' Mirea), Matei, Zamfir – Aelenei, Călin, Ursu – Ad. Petre, Lala, Tirchineci.

In the 1986–87 season, Victoria București, with Dumitru Dragomir, who was brought in as club president in early 1987 and would later become president of the Professional Football League, achieved the best league finish in its history, placing 3rd and securing a historic UEFA Cup qualification. During the same campaign, the team coached by Nicolae Dumitru assisted by Ștefan Feodot also reached the semifinals of the Cupa României, where it lost again 2–4 to Dinamo București. In that match, Victoria lined up Nițu – Comănescu, Mirea, Zare, Ursu – P. Petre, Balaur, Dican – Țălnar, Augustin (77' Caciureac), Nuță (79' Nica). The squad also included Iordache, Vlad, Topolinschi, Săndoi, Purdea, Adolf, Manu, Paraschiv, Cățoi, Tirchineci, Lala, and Glonț.

Victoria made its European debut on 15 September 1987, against EPA Larnaca. The away leg in Cyprus ended 1–0 for Victoria, with Victor Ene scoring the only goal, followed by a 3–0 win in Bucharest. Coach Nicolae Dumitru fielded a lineup consisting of Rotărescu – Comănescu, Mirea, Solomon, Topolinschi – Cojocaru, I. Balaur, V. Ene – Henzel, Nuță, Vaișcovici. In the second round, Victoria was eliminated by Dinamo Tbilisi after losing 1–2 at home and drawing 0–0 away. Domestically, the team once again finished 3rd in Divizia A, behind Steaua and Dinamo, securing another UEFA Cup qualification. In the Cupa României, Victoria reached the semifinals once more but lost again, 2–4, to Dinamo București. Players such as Nițu, Augustin, Dican, Stere, Iordache, Uleșan, Ursu, Damaschin, Laiș, Caciureac, and Pall also featured in the squad during this campaign.

Led by Florin Halagian, with Gheorghe Timar as assistant, Victoria had a remarkable 1988–89 UEFA Cup campaign, defeating Sliema Wanderers (2–0, 6–1) in the first round, then advanced past Dinamo Minsk after a 1–2 loss away and a 1–0 home win, with Solomon converting a penalty. In the third round, TPS Turku was narrowly eliminated (1–0, 2–3), and a quarter-final spot was secured. The tie against Dynamo Dresden began with a 1–1 draw in Bucharest (Damaschin scoring), but ended with a 0–4 loss in East Germany. Domestically, Victoria finished 3rd in Divizia A for the third consecutive year, secured another UEFA Cup qualification, and reached the Cupa României semifinals for the fourth straight season, once again being eliminated by Dinamo București (0–2). Marcel Coraș contributed with 36 goals, earning the European Silver Boot finishing seven goals behind Dinamo București’s Dorin Mateuț, the Golden Boot winner. The standard lineup comprised Nițu – D. Daniel, Mirea, Zare, V. Cojocaru – Laiș, D. Ștefan, C. Solomon, Kulcsár (Ursea) – Damaschin (Țîră), Coraș, with additional squad members including Pavel, M. Pană, Ursu, Șt. Bălan, Fulga, Topolinschi, Uleșan, Dican, Feodot, V. Dumitrescu, and Iftodi.

In the following UEFA Cup season, Victoria was eliminated in the first round by Valencia CF, after a 1–3 loss away and a 1–1 draw at home. In Divizia A, the team was in 4th place at the halfway point of the season. However, the club was disbanded in January 1990 following the Romanian Revolution from December 1989. The last match in the club's history was a 2–2 draw against SC Bacău. The squad included Moraru, Nițu, V. Cojocaru, Topolinschi, D. Ștefan, M. Pană, Ursu, Fulga, Orac, Hanganu, Al. Nicolae, Țîră, Solomon, V. Dumitrescu, Al. Dinu, Kulcsár, Cigan, Coraș, and Ursea.

== Honours ==
Liga II

- Winners (1): 1984–85
- Runners-up (2): 1959–60, 1982–83

Liga III

- Winners (2): 1964–65, 1981–82

Liga IV – Bucharest

- Winners (2): 1970–71, 1980–81

Cupa României

- Finalists (1): 1959–60 (Note: Under the name of Dinamo Obor București.)

== European Cups ==
Even so, during its short existence, the club reached one quarter final in the UEFA Cup 1988–89. They were eliminated by Dynamo Dresden (1–1 in Bucharest and 0–4 in Dresden), a team from former East Germany, where Matthias Sammer was a young rising star.

Victoria București in Europe

Competition	P	W	D	L	GF	GA	GD
UEFA Europa League / UEFA Cup	14	6	3	5	21	17	+ 4
Total	14	6	3	5	21	17	+ 4

== Ground ==
Before its promotion to Divizia A, Victoria played its home matches on a training pitch within the Dinamo Sports Complex, which could hold around 1,500 spectators, as the club did not have a stadium of its own. Upon reaching the top flight, the team initially used the main Dinamo Stadium, but due to the pitch's inability to support two teams, the club was forced to relocate its home matches to various venues, including the Metalul Stadium in Bucharest, as well as Metalul Stadium in Plopeni, Poiana Stadium in Câmpina, and the Progresul Stadium in Bucharest. In 1987, Victoria transferred the scaffolding stands from the Progresul ground to build its own stadium—Victoria Stadium—within the Dinamo Sports Complex, behind the main arena. The ground was expanded to accommodate approximately 8,000 spectators and became the club’s primary venue for both domestic and European matches.

== Notable former players ==
Victoria was known as a team that enrolled only good players, however not good enough to be enrolled by Steaua or Dinamo. They were either players in their retirement age or talents not good enough for the "big 2".

- (Romania) Ionel Augustin
- (Romania) Costel Orac
- (Romania) Cornel Țălnar
- (Romania) Claudiu Vaișcovici
- (Romania) Marcel Coraș
- (Romania) Ovidiu Hanganu
- (Romania) Marian Pană
- (Romania) Sándor Kulcsár

== Former managers ==
- (Romania) Sebastian Taciuc (1951–1958)
- (Romania) Nicolae Petrescu (1958–1960)
- (Romania) Constantin Teașcă (1960–1961)
- (Romania) Gheorghe Timar (1964–1965)
- (Romania) Nicolae Dumitru (1965–1967)
- (Romania) Constantin Frățilă (1982)
- (Romania) Constantin Teașcă (1982–1984)
- (Romania) Florin Cheran (1984–1985)
- (Romania) Ion Nunweiller (1985–1986)
- (Romania) Nicolae Dumitru (1986–1988)
- (Romania) Florin Halagian (1988–1989)
