= Dorian Ștefan =

Polish footballer

Personal information
- Date of birth: 13 October 1959 (age 67)
- Place of birth: Sibiu, Romania
- Position: Midfielder

Senior career*
Years	Team	Apps	(Gls)
1976–1985	Șoimii Sibiu	138	(5)
1985–1988	Argeș Pitești	72	(6)
1989	Victoria București	30	(0)
1990	Argeș Pitești	1	(0)
1990	Vålerenga	10	(1)
Total		251	(12)

International career
1986–1988	Romania Olympic	10	(0)
- * Club domestic league appearances and goals

Dorian Ștefan (born 13 October 1959) is a retired Romanian football midfielder.

== Club career ==
Ștefan was born on 13 October 1959 in Sibiu, Romania. He began playing football in 1976 at Șoimii Sibiu in Divizia B. In 1985, he joined Argeș Pitești, making his Divizia A debut on 14 September under coach Florin Halagian in a 2–0 away loss to Dinamo București. Argeș reached the 1987–88 Balkans Cup final, where he played in both legs of the 6–1 aggregate loss to Slavia Sofia. Ștefan went to play for Victoria București in 1989, where he reunited with Halagian. There, he played in both legs of the 5–1 aggregate loss to Dynamo Dresden in the 1988–89 UEFA Cup quarter-finals. Subsequently, he played in a 1–1 draw against Valencia in the first round of the 1989–90 UEFA Cup. Following the 1989 Romanian Revolution, Ștefan returned to Argeș, where he made his last Divizia A appearance on 25 March 1990 in a 2–1 away loss to Steaua București, totaling 103 matches with six goals in the competition.

In 1990, Ștefan went to play in Norway for Vålerenga, making his Tippeligaen debut on 29 April under coach Dag Vestlund in a 1–0 home loss to Molde. He scored his only goal in the competition on 10 June in a 2–2 draw against Strømsgodset. Ștefan played 10 games in the Norwegian league over the course of the 1990 season, retiring afterwards. In Norway, Ștefan earned a lasting reputation as one of the least successful foreign players. He was called a pig in a poke, in Norway worded as a "cat in a sack", with Dagbladet calling Ștefan "the most expensive cat that has ever been in a sack". Aftenposten included Ștefan on their list of the five least successful foreign imports during the years 1981–1991. Verdens Gang analyzed that while the fall of the Iron Curtain entailed an influx of Eastern Bloc players, almost none of them managed to adapt to Norwegian football during the initial years, including Ștefan, Ivaylo Kirov, Marek Filipczak, Janusz Kudyba and Marek Motyka.

== International career ==
From 1986 to 1988, Ștefan played 10 matches for Romania's Olympic team.

== Honours ==
Argeș Pitești

- Balkans Cup runner-up: 1987–88
