= Imre Szepi =

Romanian footballer

Imre Szepi (born 6 January 1954 in Câmpulung la Tisa) is a Romanian football player, part of the best team FC Baia Mare ever had, between 1977 and 1980. He also played for Minerul Baia Sprie.

Szepi's best quality was his speed. His teammates revealed that he could match a time good enough to qualify him for the 100m race of the Olympic Games.

Szepi was selected for the enlarged Romania team but did not win any caps.
