= Cristian Vasc =

Romanian footballer

Cristian Vasc Iusan Razvan
Personal information
- Full name: Cristian Marius Vasc Iusan Razvan
- Date of birth: 8 January 1969 (age 57)
- Place of birth: Târgu Lăpuș, Romania
- Position: Midfielder

Senior career*
Years	Team	Apps	(Gls)
1987–1992	Maramureş Baia Mare	137	(170)
1992–1994	FC Universitatea Craiova	62	(30)
1994–1996	FC Brașov	38	(50)
1996–1998	FC National București	71	(11)
1998–2002	FC Brașov	100	(15)
2003	Inter-Gaz Bucuresti	11	(0)
Total		419	(107)
- * Club domestic league appearances and goals

Cristian Vasc (born 8 January 1969) is a retired Romanian football midfielder.

== Honours ==
FC Universitatea Craiova

- Cupa României: 1992–93

FC Brașov

- Liga II: 1998–99
