= Vasile Caciureac =

Romanian former football striker

Personal information
- Full name: Vasile Caciureac
- Date of birth: 19 October 1962 (age 64)
- Place of birth: Sighetu Marmației, Romania
- Positions: Midfielder; striker

Youth career
- 1979–1980: CSŞ Baia Mare

Senior career*
Years	Team	Apps	(Gls)
1980–1981	CIL Sighetu Marmației		
1981–1982	FC Baia Mare		
1982–1983	CIL Sighetu Marmației		
1983–1984	Steaua CFR Cluj		
1984–1985	CIL Mecanica Sighet		
1985	FC Baia Mare	13	(3)
1985–1986	CIL Sighetu Marmației		
1986–1987	Victoria București	18	(5)
1987–1988	Petrolul Ploieşti	14	(1)
1988–1990	FCM Braşov	43	(6)
1990–1993	Rapid București	75	(22)
1993–1994	Rocar București	7	(1)
1994–1995	Sagesse Beirut		
1996–1997	Tadamon Sour		
2001–2002	Aversa București		

Managerial career
- 2001–2002: Aversa București
- 2005–2006: CF Brăila (assistant manager)
- 2006–2007: Aversa București
- 2008: CS Buftea (assistant manager)
- 2009: Gloria Buzău (assistant manager)
- * Club domestic league appearances and goals

Vasile Caciureac (born 19 October 1962 in Sighetu Marmației, Romania) is a Romanian former football striker. He played for several Divizia A teams, including Rapid București, FCM Braşov, Petrolul Ploieşti, FC Baia Mare and the defunct Victoria București.

== Career ==
Born in Sighetu Marmației, he was raised in Crăciuneşti village, Maramureș County. When he was 18, he made his league debut, playing for Second Division team CIL Sighetu Marmației. In 1981, he returned to Baia Mare, where he played football at a youth level for Club Sportiv Şcolar, signing with FC Baia Mare.

After playing the Romanian Cup final in FC Baia Mare's shirt, lost against Dinamo București, he returned to Sighet. After one season, he moved to Steaua CFR Cluj, but his team relegated in the Third League. His third spell at CIL Sighetu Marmației was a good one, and his team won the promotion back to Divizia B.

In the second part of the season, he was loaned to FC Baia Mare, making his debut in the first league (Divizia A), but he returned to play for the fourth time at Sighet. In 1986, he was sold to Victoria București, a topflight team, and he played Divizia A football 8 consecutive seasons after that, finishing two times on the third place.

After spells at Petrolul Ploieşti and FCM Braşov, he returned to Bucharest, playing for FC Rapid. He soon earned a place in the Rapid starting eleven, playing three seasons and a half for them. After a short period of time spent at Rocar București, he moved to Lebanon, where he played for Sagesse Beirut and Tadamon Sour.

In 2002, he returned to Liga III's Aversa București as manager, and retired as a player.

== Personal life ==
He is married to former long jumper Vali Ionescu. Both of them have represented Rapid București. They have two children: a boy, Sergiu, and a girl, Alexandra.
