= 1982–83 Divizia A =

65th season of top-tier football league in Romania

Divizia A
- Season: 1982–83
- Champions: Dinamo București
- Top goalscorer: Petre Grosu (20)

The 1982–83 Divizia A was the sixty-fifth season of Divizia A, the top-level football league of Romania.

== Teams ==
Location of teams in 1982-83 Divizia A

== League table ==
Pos	Team	Pld	W	D	L	GF	GA	GD	Pts	Qualification or relegation
1	Dinamo București (C)	34	17	15	2	62	25	+37	49	Qualification to European Cup first round
2	Universitatea Craiova	34	20	6	8	66	29	+37	46	Qualification to UEFA Cup first round
3	Sportul Studenţesc București	34	18	8	8	48	29	+19	44	Qualification to UEFA Cup first round
4	Argeș Pitești	34	17	6	11	50	37	+13	40	Invitation to Balkans Cup
5	Steaua București	34	14	10	10	47	41	+6	38	
6	Corvinul Hunedoara	34	13	8	13	46	38	+8	34	
7	Olt Scornicești	34	14	5	15	47	36	+11	33	
8	ASA Târgu Mureș	34	13	7	14	41	42	−1	33	
9	Jiul Petroșani	34	12	9	13	35	43	−8	33	
10	Politehnica Iași	34	11	10	13	37	40	−3	32	
11	Bihor Oradea	34	12	8	14	56	62	−6	32	
12	Petrolul Ploiești	34	14	4	16	38	55	−17	32	
13	SC Bacău	34	12	7	15	43	47	−4	31	
14	CS Târgoviște	34	10	11	13	36	44	−8	31	
15	Chimia Râmnicu Vâlcea	34	12	7	15	33	43	−10	31	
16	FCM Brașov (R)	34	11	7	16	41	51	−10	29	Relegation to Divizia B
17	Politehnica Timișoara (R)	34	9	6	19	35	64	−29	24	Relegation to Divizia B
18	FC Constanța (R)	34	7	6	21	30	65	−35	20	Relegation to Divizia B

Source: LT
Rules for classification: 1) points; 2) goal difference; 3) number of goals scored
(C) Champions; (R) Relegated

=== Results ===
Home \ Away	ASA	ARG	BAC	BHO	BRA	CON	COR	UCR	DIN	JIU	OLT	PET	PIA	RAM	SPO	STE	POL	TAR
ASA Târgu Mureș	—	3–1	1–1	2–2	3–0	2–0	3–0	1–0	1–1	4–0	1–0	2–0	0–0	3–0	0–0	4–0	1–0	2–0
Argeș Pitești	1–0	—	3–0	2–0	2–0	4–0	0–0	1–0	1–0	4–0	2–1	1–1	1–0	1–1	1–2	2–1	3–1	2–0
Bacău	2–0	5–2	—	2–0	1–0	3–0	0–0	2–1	0–0	2–1	1–3	2–0	3–1	1–0	2–0	1–1	2–1	0–0
Bihor Oradea	4–1	3–2	2–0	—	2–2	5–2	1–0	1–2	2–2	1–1	3–1	3–1	1–1	2–1	2–0	4–1	1–1	5–1
Brașov	6–2	1–0	0–0	1–3	—	1–0	1–0	0–0	0–1	3–0	1–0	5–1	1–2	1–1	1–1	1–1	4–0	2–1
Constanța	1–1	3–0	1–0	4–1	4–2	—	1–2	0–1	1–1	1–1	1–0	0–2	0–2	0–0	0–2	0–1	2–1	4–1
Corvinul Hunedoara	5–0	2–1	4–0	3–0	1–2	2–1	—	0–0	1–1	2–0	1–0	3–0	5–2	2–0	1–2	1–3	3–0	2–1
Universitatea Craiova	4–0	1–0	2–0	5–3	3–0	5–0	3–1	—	1–1	4–0	2–1	3–1	1–0	3–0	1–0	5–2	8–0	1–1
Dinamo București	2–1	2–0	3–1	3–1	3–1	3–0	2–0	1–1	—	1–0	3–1	6–0	1–0	2–0	1–1	1–1	7–2	3–0
Jiul Petroșani	2–0	1–0	4–3	0–0	3–0	3–0	1–1	3–1	1–1	—	1–0	2–0	0–0	2–1	0–0	2–1	2–0	4–1
Olt Scornicești	1–1	0–1	3–2	2–0	4–0	3–0	3–0	1–0	1–1	3–1	—	5–0	1–0	4–1	1–2	2–1	2–0	0–0
Petrolul Ploiești	1–0	1–2	3–2	4–2	1–0	4–0	2–0	0–1	1–1	1–0	3–1	—	2–0	2–1	0–1	1–0	2–0	1–0
Politehnica Iași	0–1	2–4	1–1	4–1	1–0	2–1	1–1	1–1	2–0	2–0	2–1	1–0	—	0–1	2–1	1–1	3–0	2–2
Chimia Râmnicu Vâlcea	2–0	0–2	2–0	1–0	3–1	2–0	0–0	0–1	0–0	1–0	1–1	1–1	3–1	—	3–2	2–1	2–0	1–0
Sportul Studențesc București	3–1	2–2	1–0	4–1	2–0	1–1	1–1	1–0	0–3	0–0	2–0	2–1	3–0	1–0	—	2–1	6–0	2–0
Steaua București	1–0	2–0	2–1	0–0	1–1	2–2	1–0	1–3	1–1	2–0	2–0	5–1	1–0	2–1	2–0	—	3–0	1–1
Politehnica Timișoara	1–0	1–1	3–2	5–0	1–2	4–0	3–1	3–0	1–3	0–0	0–0	3–0	1–1	1–0	0–1	0–1	—	1–0
Târgoviște	1–0	1–1	2–1	1–0	3–1	1–0	2–1	3–2	1–1	3–0	0–1	0–0	0–0	6–1	1–0	1–1	1–1	—

Source: LT (in Romanian)
Legend: Blue = home team win; Yellow = draw; Red = away team win.

== Top goalscorers ==
Position	Player	Club	Goals
1	Petre Grosu	Bihor Oradea	20
2	Sorin Cârţu	Universitatea Craiova	19
2	Iulius Nemțeanu	Politehnica Iaşi	19
4	Ionel Augustin	Dinamo București	14
4	Mircea Sandu	Sportul Studenţesc București	14

== Champion squad ==
Dinamo București

Goalkeepers: Constantin Eftimescu (6 / 0); Dumitru Moraru (31 / 0).
Defenders: Marin Ion (29 / 0); Cornel Dinu (25 / 0); Alexandru Nicolae (30 / 4); Teofil Stredie (26 / 0); Nelu Stănescu (14 / 0); Nicușor Vlad (5 / 0); Laurențiu Moldovan (8 / 0); Ioan Mărginean (1 / 0).
Midfielders: Gheorghe Mulțescu (31 / 6); Ionel Augustin (31 / 14); Marin Dragnea (30 / 7); Alexandru Custov (28 / 2); Lică Movilă (16 / 4).
Forwards: Cornel Țălnar (23 / 4); Pompiliu Iordache (26 / 5); Dudu Georgescu (8 / 5); Florea Văetuș (31 / 7); Costel Orac (30 / 4); Stere Sertov (3 / 0).
(league appearances and goals listed in brackets)

Manager: Nicolae Dumitru.

== Attendances ==
No.	Club	Average
1	Craiova	22,353
2	Dinamo 1948	13,529
3	Argeş	13,412
4	Constanţa	13,176
5	Steaua	13,000
6	Bihor	13,000
7	Tārgovişte	12,647
8	Petrolul	10,412
9	Timişoara	10,388
10	Iaşi	10,206
11	Braşov	9,882
12	Rāmnicu Vālcea	9,412
13	Bacău	8,706
14	Hunedoara	8,559
15	Tīrgu Mureş	7,706
16	Jiul	7,324
17	Sportul Studenţesc	5,118
18	Olt Scorniceşti	4,029

== See also ==
- 1982–83 Divizia B
- 1982–83 Divizia C
- 1982–83 Cupa României
