= Stere Sertov =

Romanian footballer (1963–2022)

Personal information
- Date of birth: 5 February 1963
- Place of birth: Mihail Kogălniceanu, Constanța, Romania
- Date of death: 3 May 2022 (aged 59)
- Place of death: Bucharest, Romania
- Position: Forward

Senior career*
Years	Team	Apps	(Gls)
1980–1982	Steaua București	18	(2)
1982–1983	Dinamo București	3	(0)
1983–1985	Politehnica Iași	41	(8)
1987–1989	Politehnica Iași		
1989–1990	CFR Pașcani		
Total		62	(10)

International career
1981	Romania U20	6	(1)
Medal record
Representing Romania
FIFA World Youth Championship
Bronze medal – third place	FIFA U-20 World Cup	1981
- * Club domestic league appearances and goals

Stere Sertov (5 February 1963 – 3 May 2022) was a Romanian footballer who played as a forward.

== Club career ==
Sertov was born on 5 February 1963 in Mihail Kogălniceanu, Constanța, Romania. He made his Divizia A debut at age 18, playing for Steaua București on 7 June 1981 under coach Gheorghe Constantin in a 1–0 victory against Progresul București. In 1982, Sertov joined Dinamo București where he appeared in only three league games under coach Nicolae Dumitru, but managed to win the title. Subsequently, he went to play for Politehnica Iași where in two seasons he scored eight goals in 41 league appearances, but an injury kept him off the field for the following two seasons. Afterwards, he returned to play for Politehnica, this time in Divizia B. Two years later, Sertov moved to CFR Pașcani, where after only one season he ended his career in 1990. He has a total of 62 appearances and 10 goals scored in Divizia A.

== International career ==
Sertov was selected by coach Constantin Cernăianu to be part of Romania's under-20 squad for the 1981 World Youth Championship held in Australia. He appeared in six games, scoring once in a 1–0 victory against South Korea in the group stage, helping the team finish the tournament in third position, winning the bronze medal.

== After retirement ==
After he retired from football, Sertov worked as a judicial police officer.

== Death ==
Sertov, who suffered from diabetes, died on 3 May 2022 at the Floreasca Hospital in Bucharest.

== Honours ==
Dinamo București

- Divizia A: 1982–83
