= Alexandru Koller =

Romanian footballer (born 1953)

Personal information
- Date of birth: 20 April 1953 (age 73)
- Place of birth: Cehu Silvaniei, Romania
- Height: 1.88 m (6 ft 2 in)
- Position: Defender

Youth career
- 1967–1968: Progresul Cehu-Silvaniei
- 1968–1970: Dinamo Zalău

Senior career*
| Years | Team | Apps | (Gls) |
| 1970–1972 | Unirea Zalău | 44 | (0) |
| 1972–1974 | ASA Târgu Mureș | 3 | (0) |
| 1974–1984 | FC Baia Mare (Note: Not all seasons and goals are available) | 124 | (23) |

International career
| 1976–1979 | Romania | 5 | (0) |
- * Club domestic league appearances and goals

Alexandru Koller (born 20 April 1953) is a Romanian former footballer turned businessman. A defender, he played for Unirea Zalău, ASA Târgu Mureș and FC Baia Mare. He made five appearances for the Romania national team.

== Club career ==
Koller was born on 20 April 1953 in Cehu Silvaniei, Sălaj, Romania and began playing junior-level football in 1967 at local club Progresul, before moving one year later to Dinamo Zalău. He started his senior career by playing for Unirea Zalău during the 1970–71 Divizia C season. In 1972, he moved to ASA Târgu Mureș, making his Divizia A debut on 26 November under coach Tiberiu Bone in a 3–0 away loss to Rapid București. Koller joined Divizia B club FC Baia Mare in 1974, securing promotion with them at the end of the 1977–78 season. Subsequently, during the 1979–80 season, he scored eight goals to help the team finish in fourth place. However, in the following season, he could not prevent the club's relegation back to Divizia B. Baia Mare reached the 1982 Cupa României final, in which under coach Paul Popescu, Koller played the entire match and scored a goal from a penalty kick in the 3–2 loss to Dinamo București. He then played in both legs of the 5–2 aggregate loss to Real Madrid in the first round of the 1982–83 European Cup Winners' Cup, scoring once in the second leg at the Santiago Bernabéu Stadium. During the same season, he scored six league goals to help the team gain promotion back to the first league. Afterwards, Koller made his last Divizia A appearance on 1 October 1983 in a 4–1 away loss to Dinamo, totaling 98 matches with 17 goals in the competition.

== International career ==
Koller played five friendly matches for Romania, making his debut on 2 July 1976 under coach Ștefan Kovács in a 2–2 draw against Iran. His last appearance for the national team took place on 14 October 1979 in a 3–1 away loss to the Soviet Union.

== After retiremenet ==
Koller retired from football in 1983, aged only 30, to become vice-president of FC Baia Mare, a position he held until 1984. Subsequently, from 1990 to 1996 he was president and owner of the club. He was also a businessman.

== Personal life ==
Koller's nephew, Ákos, was also a footballer who played for Videoton FC Fehérvár and the Hungary national team, among other teams.

== Honours ==
FC Baia Mare

- Divizia B: 1977–78, 1982–83
- Cupa României runner-up: 1981–82
