= Stoina =

- Commune
- Location in Romania
- Coordinates: 44°41′N 23°38′E
- Country: Romania
- County: Gorj
- Subdivisions: Ciorari, Mielușei, Păișani, Stoina, Toiaga, Ulmet, Urda de Sus
- Area: 41.83 km^{2} (16.15 sq mi)
- Population (2021-12-01): 2,133
  - Density: 50.99/km^{2} (132.1/sq mi)
- Time zone: UTC+02:00 (EET)
  - Summer (DST): UTC+03:00 (EEST)
- Vehicle reg.: GJ

Stoina is a commune in Gorj County, Oltenia, Romania. It is composed of seven villages: Ciorari, Mielușei, Păișani, Stoina, Toiaga, Ulmet and Urda de Sus.

== Notable people ==
- Ioanna Andreesco (born 1934, writer and anthropologist
