= 1982 FIFA World Cup qualification – UEFA Group 4 =

International football contest

Group 4 consisted of five of the 34 teams entered into the European zone: England, Hungary, Norway, Romania, and Switzerland. These five teams competed on a home-and-away basis for two of the 14 spots in the final tournament allocated to the European zone, with the group's winner and runner-up claiming those spots. England beat already-qualified Hungary in the final game to leapfrog Romania for the second qualifying place.

== Standings ==
Rank	Team	Pts	Pld	W	D	L	GF	GA	GD
1	Hungary	10	8	4	2	2	13	8	+5
2	England	9	8	4	1	3	13	8	+5
3	Romania	8	8	2	4	2	5	5	0
4	Switzerland	7	8	2	3	3	9	12	−3
5	Norway	6	8	2	2	4	8	15	−7

=== Results ===
10 September 1980

England	4 – 0	Norway
McDermott 37', 78' (pen.); Woodcock 69'; Mariner 85'	Report

Wembley Stadium, London
Attendance: 48,246
Referee: Marcel van Langenhove (Belgium)

24 September 1980

Norway	1 – 1	Romania
Hareide 23'	Report	Iordănescu 10'

Ullevaal Stadion, Oslo
Attendance: 22,350
Referee: Siegfried Kirschen (East Germany)

15 October 1980

Romania	2 – 1	England
Răducanu 35'; Iordănescu 75' (pen.)	Report	Woodcock 64'

Stadionul 23. August, Bucharest
Attendance: 75,000
Referee: Ulf Eriksson (Sweden)

29 October 1980

Switzerland	1 – 2	Norway
Barberis 49'	Report	Hareide 5'; Mathisen 79'

Wankdorf, Bern
Attendance: 14,000
Referee: Dušan Krchňák (Czechoslovakia)

19 November 1980

England	2 – 1	Switzerland
Tanner 23' (o.g.); Mariner 31'	Report	Pfister 76'

Wembley, London
Attendance: 70,000
Referee: Jan Keizer (Netherlands)

28 April 1981

Switzerland	2 – 2	Hungary
Sulser 32', 47'	Report	Bálint 45'; S. Müller 65' (pen.)

Stadion Allmend, Lucerne
Attendance: 17,000
Referee: Ian Foote (Scotland)

29 April 1981

England	0 – 0	Romania
	Report

Wembley Stadium, London
Attendance: 62,500
Referee: Heinz Aldinger (West Germany)

13 May 1981

Hungary	1 – 0	Romania
Fazekas 18'	Report

Népstadion, Budapest
Attendance: 68,000
Referee: Alexis Ponnet (Belgium)

20 May 1981

Norway	1 – 2	Hungary
Thoresen 57'	Report	L. Kiss 78', 79'

Ullevaal Stadion, Oslo
Attendance: 23,000
Referee: Malcom Moffatt (Northern Ireland)

30 May 1981

Switzerland	2 – 1	England
Scheiwiler 29'; Sulser 31'	Report	McDermott 55'

St. Jakob Stadion, Basel
Attendance: 38,000
Referee: Adolf Prokop (East Germany)

3 June 1981

Romania	1 – 0	Norway
Ţicleanu 67'	Report

Stadionul 23. August, Bucharest
Attendance: 55,000
Referee: Erkan Göksel (Turkey)

6 June 1981

Hungary	1 – 3	England
Garaba 44'	Report	Brooking 19', 60'; Keegan 73' (pen.)

Népstadion, Budapest
Attendance: 62,000
Referee: Paolo Casarin (Italy)

17 June 1981

Norway	1 – 1	Switzerland
Davidsen 88'	Report	Barberis 62'

Ullevaal Stadion, Oslo
Attendance: 18,022
Referee: Eduard Shklovsky (Soviet Union)

9 September 1981

Norway	2 – 1	England
Lund 35'; Thoresen 41'	Report	Robson 15'

Ullevaal Stadion, Oslo
Attendance: 23,500
Referee: Jerzy Kacprzak (Poland)

Lowly Norway's win was a major shock and prompted a rapturous English-language encomium from Norwegian radio commentator Bjørge Lillelien which became famous in Britain and Scandinavia.

23 September 1981

Romania	0 – 0	Hungary
	Report

Stadionul 23. August, Bucharest
Attendance: 70,000
Referee: Erich Linemayr (Austria)

10 October 1981

Romania	1 – 2	Switzerland
Balaci 56'	Report	Zappa 68'; Lüthi 75'

Stadionul 23. August, Bucharest
Attendance: 55,000
Referee: Enzo Barbaresco (Italy)

14 October 1981

Hungary	3 – 0	Switzerland
Nyilasi 23', 50'; Fazekas 59'	Report

Népstadion, Budapest
Attendance: 62,000
Referee: Talat Tokat (Turkey)

31 October 1981

Hungary	4 – 1	Norway
Bálint 12'; L. Kiss 60', 85'; Fazekas 79'	Report	Lund 35'

Népstadion, Budapest
Attendance: 68,000
Referee: Egon Šoštarić (Yugoslavia)

11 November 1981

Switzerland	0 – 0	Romania
	Report

Wankdorf, Bern
Attendance: 27,112
Referee: César Correia (Portugal)

18 November 1981

England	1 – 0	Hungary
Mariner 16'	Report

Wembley Stadium, London
Attendance: 82,000
Referee: Georges Konrath (France)
