= 1984–85 Divizia B =

Divizia B
- Season: 1984–85
- Promoted: Petrolul Ploiești; Dinamo Victoria București; Universitatea Cluj
- Relegated: FEPA 74 Bârlad; Metalul București; Metalurgistul Cugir; Metalul Mangalia; Unirea Alexandria; Sticla Arieșul Turda; Partizanul Bacău; Autobuzul București; Gloria Reșița; Unirea Dinamo Focșani; Minerul Motru; IS Câmpia Turzii

The 1984–85 Divizia B was the 45th season of the second tier of the Romanian football league system.

The format has been maintained to three series, each having 18 teams. At the end of the season the winners of the series were promoted to Divizia A and the last four places from each series were relegated to Divizia C.

== Team changes ==
=== To Divizia B ===
Relegated from Divizia A

- Dunărea CSU Galați
- Petrolul Ploiești
- CS Târgoviște

Promoted from Divizia C

- CFR Pașcani
- FEPA 74 Bârlad
- Metalul Mangalia
- Mizil
- MF Steaua București
- Flacăra-Automecanica Moreni
- Drobeta-Turnu Severin
- Mureșul Deva
- Strungul Arad
- Sticla Arieșul Turda
- Unirea Alba Iulia
- Tractorul Brașov

=== From Divizia B ===
Promoted to Divizia A

- Gloria Buzău
- FCM Brașov
- Politehnica Timișoara

Relegated to Divizia C

- Delta Tulcea
- Nitramonia Făgăraș
- CFR Caransebeș
- CSM Borzești
- ROVA Roșiori
- Steaua CFR Cluj-Napoca
- Unirea Slobozia
- Constructorul Craiova
- Someșul Satu Mare
- Dunărea Călărași
- Chimia Turnu Măgurele
- Rapid Arad

=== Renamed teams ===
AS Mizil was renamed Steaua Mizil.

Mureșul Deva was renamed Mureșul Explorări Deva.

Prahova Ploiești was renamed Prahova CSU Ploiești.

== League tables ==
=== Serie I ===
Pos	Team	Pld	W	D	L	GF	GA	GD	Pts	Promotion or relegation
1	Petrolul Ploiești (C, P)	34	24	6	4	67	23	+44	54	Promotion to Divizia A
2	Dunărea CSU Galați	34	22	4	8	54	28	+26	48	
3	Oțelul Galați	34	15	8	11	63	31	+32	38	
4	FC Constanța	34	14	7	13	54	43	+11	35	
5	Metalul Plopeni	34	16	3	15	51	50	+1	35	
6	CSM Suceava	34	15	4	15	53	51	+2	34	
7	Olimpia Râmnicu Sărat	34	15	4	15	39	44	−5	34	
8	Steaua Mizil	34	15	4	15	56	63	−7	34	
9	Prahova CSU Ploiești	34	14	5	15	37	36	+1	33	
10	Progresul Brăila	34	16	1	17	45	48	−3	33	
11	Ceahlăul Piatra Neamț	34	12	8	14	44	49	−5	32	
12	CFR Pașcani	34	15	2	17	42	50	−8	32	
13	Chimia Fălticeni	34	14	4	16	38	46	−8	32	
14	CS Botoșani	34	13	6	15	42	50	−8	32	
15	FEPA 74 Bârlad (R)	34	13	5	16	33	52	−19	31	Relegation to Divizia C
16	Metalul Mangalia (R)	34	13	4	17	41	47	−6	30	Relegation to Divizia C
17	Partizanul Bacău (R)	34	12	1	21	35	57	−22	25	Relegation to Divizia C
18	Unirea Dinamo Focșani (R)	34	7	6	21	32	58	−26	20	Relegation to Divizia C

Source: romaniansoccer.ro (in Romanian)
Rules for classification: 1) Points; 2) Goal difference; 3) Goals scored; 4) Head-to-head points; 5) Head-to-head goal difference; 6) Head-to-head goals scored; 7) Head-to-head away goals scored.
(C) Champions; (P) Promoted; (R) Relegated

=== Serie II ===
Pos	Team	Pld	W	D	L	GF	GA	GD	Pts	Promotion or relegation
1	Dinamo Victoria București (C, P)	34	18	12	4	69	41	+28	48	Promotion to Divizia A
2	Șoimii IPA Sibiu	34	17	4	13	54	39	+15	38	
3	Progresul Vulcan București	34	16	6	12	59	48	+11	38	
4	Tractorul Brașov	34	14	8	12	47	40	+7	36	
5	CS Târgoviște (Note: CS Târgoviște were deducted 3 points.)	34	16	6	12	51	38	+13	35	
6	Gaz Metan Mediaș	34	15	5	14	35	42	−7	35	
7	Mecanică Fină Steaua București	34	15	4	15	52	49	+3	34	
8	Automatica București	34	14	6	14	40	37	+3	34	
9	Chimica Târnăveni	34	15	4	15	54	55	−1	34	
10	Carpați Mârșa	34	14	5	15	47	43	+4	33	
11	IP Aluminiu Slatina	34	14	5	15	43	43	0	33	
12	Drobeta-Turnu Severin	34	15	3	16	49	50	−1	33	
13	Flacăra-Automecanica Moreni	34	13	7	14	46	51	−5	33	
14	IMASA Sfântu Gheorghe	34	11	11	12	39	48	−9	33	
15	Metalul București (R)	34	11	9	14	42	58	−16	31	Relegation to Divizia C
16	Unirea Alexandria (R)	34	9	12	13	38	46	−8	30	Relegation to Divizia C
17	Autobuzul București (R)	34	9	9	16	38	51	−13	27	Relegation to Divizia C
18	Minerul Motru (R)	34	8	8	18	28	52	−24	24	Relegation to Divizia C

Source: romaniansoccer.ro (in Romanian)
Rules for classification: 1) Points; 2) Goal difference; 3) Goals scored; 4) Head-to-head points; 5) Head-to-head goal difference; 6) Head-to-head goals scored; 7) Head-to-head away goals scored.
(C) Champions; (P) Promoted; (R) Relegated

=== Serie III ===
Pos	Team	Pld	W	D	L	GF	GA	GD	Pts	Promotion or relegation
1	Universitatea Cluj (C, P)	34	20	10	4	68	23	+45	50	Promotion to Divizia A
2	Gloria Bistrița	34	18	6	10	59	27	+32	42	
3	CSM Reșița	34	15	7	12	38	32	+6	37	
4	Aurul Brad	34	15	6	13	42	33	+9	36	
5	Strungul Arad	34	17	2	15	44	43	+1	36	
6	Armătura Zalău	34	16	3	15	53	49	+4	35	
7	Olimpia Satu Mare	34	13	8	13	51	41	+10	34	
8	CFR Timișoara	34	14	6	14	42	39	+3	34	
9	Minerul Lupeni	34	15	4	15	51	57	−6	34	
10	Minerul Cavnic	34	15	3	16	69	66	+3	33	
11	Mureșul Explorări Deva	34	12	9	13	46	43	+3	33	
12	Avântul Reghin	34	14	5	15	36	36	0	33	
13	UTA Arad	34	15	3	16	47	49	−2	33	
14	Unirea Alba Iulia	34	15	3	16	45	59	−14	33	
15	Metalurgistul Cugir (R)	34	12	6	16	36	43	−7	30	Relegation to Divizia C
16	Sticla Arieșul Turda (R)	34	12	6	16	33	58	−25	30	Relegation to Divizia C
17	Gloria Reșița (R)	34	12	2	20	33	70	−37	26	Relegation to Divizia C
18	IS Câmpia Turzii (R)	34	9	5	20	33	58	−25	23	Relegation to Divizia C

Source: romaniansoccer.ro (in Romanian)
Rules for classification: 1) Points; 2) Goal difference; 3) Goals scored; 4) Head-to-head points; 5) Head-to-head goal difference; 6) Head-to-head goals scored; 7) Head-to-head away goals scored.
(C) Champions; (P) Promoted; (R) Relegated

== See also ==
- 1984–85 Divizia A
- 1984–85 Divizia C
- 1984–85 County Championship
- 1984–85 Cupa României
