= Valentin Stănescu =

Romanian footballer and manager (1922–1994)

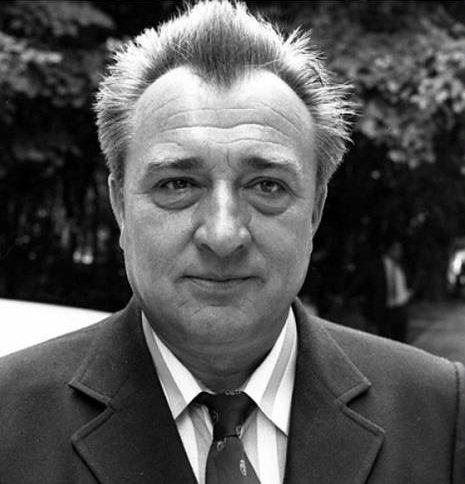
- Valentin Stănescu

Personal information
- Date of birth: 28 November 1922
- Place of birth: București, Romania
- Date of death: 5 April 1994 (aged 71)
- Position: Goalkeeper

Youth career
- 1933–1941: Olimpia București

Senior career*
Years	Team	Apps	(Gls)
1941–1942	Malaxa Tohan		
1942–1946	Sportul Studențesc (Note: The Divizia A 1940–41 was the last season before World War II and the Divizia A 1946–47 was the first one after, so the appearances and goals scored during this period for Sportul Studențesc București are not official with the exception of the 1945–46 regional championship.)	10	(0)
1946–1947	Carmen București	12	(0)
1947–1952	Locomotiva București (Note: The statistics for the 1952 Divizia B season are unavailable.)	39	(0)
Total		61	(0)

International career
1947	Romania	5	(0)

Managerial career
- 1953–1955: Locomotiva MCF București
- 1955–1958: Dunărea Giurgiu
- 1958–1959: Unirea Focșani
- 1959–1963: Metalul Târgoviște
- 1963–1968: Rapid București
- 1964: Romania Olympic
- 1968–1971: Steagul Roșu Brașov
- 1971: Romania Olympic
- 1971–1972: Steaua București
- 1973–1975: Romania
- 1976–1978: Petrolul Ploiești
- 1979–1980: Universitatea Craiova
- 1980–1981: Romania
- 1980–1982: Dinamo București
- 1982–1984: Rapid București
- * Club domestic league appearances and goals

Valentin Stănescu (28 November 1922 – 5 April 1994) was a Romanian football goalkeeper and manager. Stănescu and Constantin Cernăianu are the only two coaches who have managed the big three Bucharest city rivals, Steaua, Dinamo, and Rapid.

== Club career ==
Stănescu, also known as "Tinel" or "Zimbrul" (The bison), was born on 28 November 1922 in Bucharest, Romania and began playing junior-level football at age 11 in 1933 at local club Olimpia. In 1942, he joined Malaxa Tohan for a short while, before moving to Sportul Studențesc București for three years, during which he played a Cupa României final that was lost with 4–0 to CFR Turnu Severin.

He made his Divizia A debut playing for Carmen București under coach Petre Steinbach on 16 March 1947 in a 3–2 away victory against Dermagarand Târgu Mureș. At the end of the season, the Carmen team was dissolved by the Communist regime that just took over the country. Stănescu and teammate Bazil Marian attempted to flee to Italy by boarding a ship in the Port of Constanța. However, the authorities apprehended them, offering a choice between imprisonment or playing for a working-class team like Locomotiva București, and they both chose the latter option.

He played for Locomotiva until he retired, making his last Divizia A appearance on 27 May 1951 in a 2–1 home loss to Steaua București, totaling 51 matches in the competition. However, he spent his last season in Divizia B as the club was relegated, but Stănescu stayed with the team, helping it gain promotion back to the first division after one year.

== International career ==
Stănescu played five matches for Romania, making his debut on 22 June 1947 when coach Colea Vâlcov introduced him in the 71st minute to replace Stanislau Konrad in a 3–1 loss to Yugoslavia in the 1947 Balkan Cup. He made two more appearances in that competition, a 3–2 victory against Bulgaria and a 3–0 loss to Hungary. The latter was his last game played for the national team.

== Managerial career ==
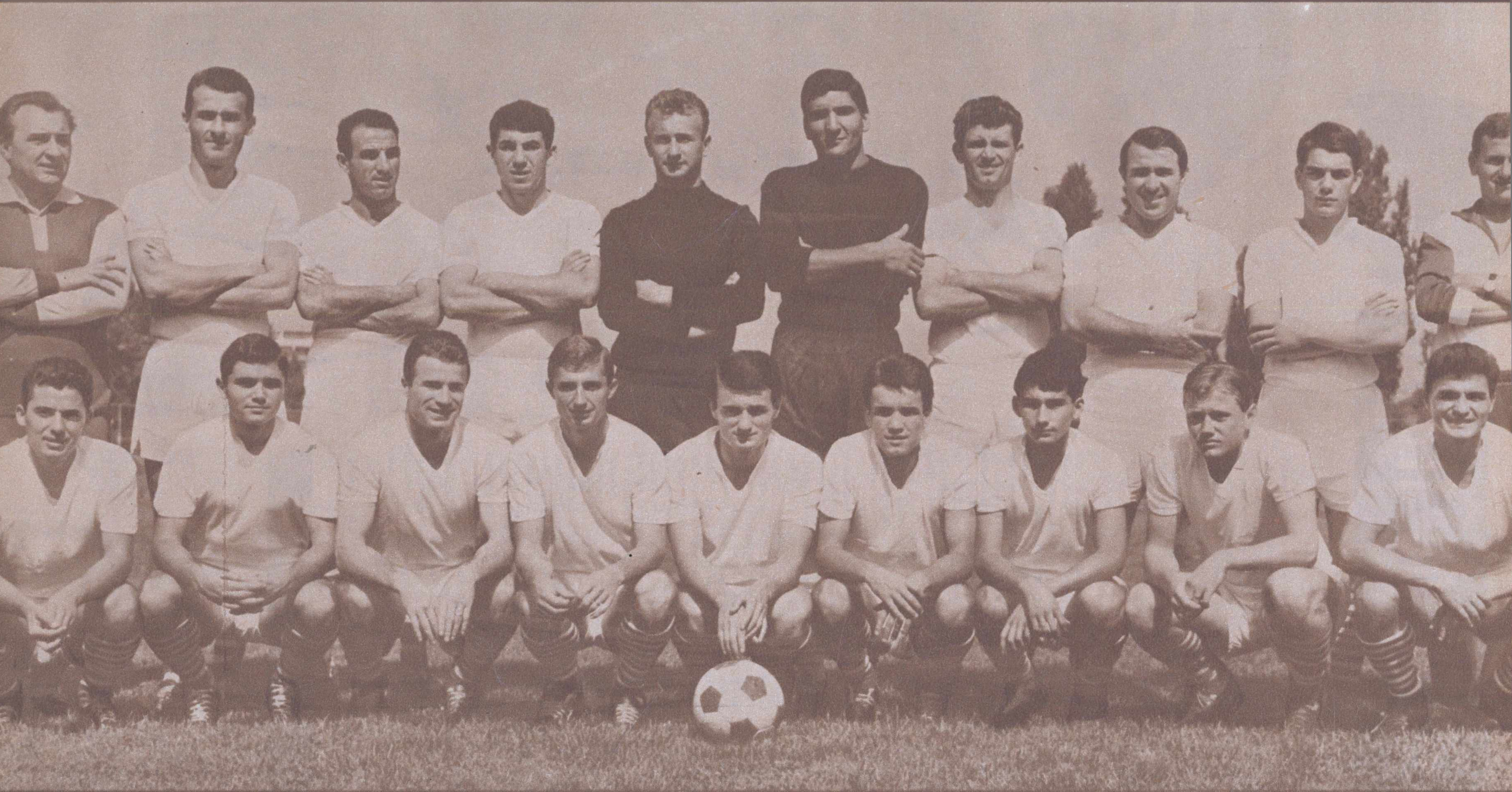
Stănescu (first from the left, back row) as head coach of Rapid București in 1965

Stănescu started his managerial career in 1953 at Locomotiva MCF București in the Romanian regional championship. In 1955, he went to coach at Dunărea Giurgiu, after three years moving to Unirea Focșani in Divizia B, helping it avoid relegation. In 1959, he started to coach Metalul Târgoviște, managing to gain promotion from Divizia C to Divizia B and later to Divizia A. There, in his first season as coach in the first division, the team was relegated as it finished in 13th place. In 1963, Stănescu went to coach Giulești based club Rapid București, where he created a team formed on the clubs juniors with some transfers including his former player from Dunărea Giurgiu Constantin Năsturescu and goalkeeper Răducanu Necula.

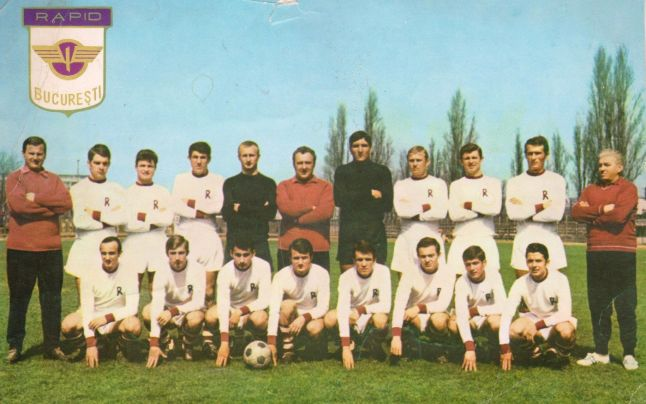
Stănescu's Rapid squad, which he led to its first league title in 1967

He was the first coach that implemented the 4–4–2 formation in Romanian football, thus creating a team that won the club's first title in the 1966–67 season. Stănescu also won two Balkans Cups, becoming the first manager to achieve this performance. In the following season he led Rapid in the 1967–68 European Cup, making his first European performance by eliminating Trakia Plovdiv with 3–2 on aggregate, being eliminated in the following round by Juventus Torino with 1–0 on aggregate. In the same season he reached the 1968 Cupa României final which was lost with 3–1 in extra time to Dinamo București that was coached by his former Carmen București teammate, Bazil Marian.

Stănescu also coached Romania's Olympic team for a short while, achieving a 2–1 away victory in a friendly against Yugoslavia on 17 June 1964. In 1968, Stănescu went to work for Divizia B side Steagul Roșu Brașov, helping it win promotion to the first league after one year. In 1971 he led for a second time Romania's Olympic team in the 1972 Summer Olympics qualifiers. The team got past Albania with 4–2 on aggregate in the first round, qualifying for the next round. There, they lost 2–1 in the away first leg against Denmark and he was replaced before the second leg. In 1971, he took over Steaua București, leading them in the 1971–72 European Cup Winners' Cup campaign. He made history by becoming the first Romanian coach to eliminate Barcelona with a 3–1 aggregate, though his team was defeated by Bayern Munich in the quarter-finals on the away goal rule after a 1–1 aggregate.

Stănescu became the coach of Romania's national team in 1973, making his debut in a friendly which ended with a 2–0 away loss to the Soviet Union. During his two-year spell, Romania managed its biggest ever victory, a 9–0 win against Finland in the 1974 World Cup qualifiers. Stănescu took charge of Divizia B club Petrolul Ploiești in 1976, helping it gain promotion to the first league after one year. In 1979, he went to coach Universitatea Craiova, a team he helped win the 1979–80 title. While with "U" Craiova, he also became the first Romanian coach who eliminated a team from England, Leeds United, with 4–0 on aggregate in the second round of the 1979–80 UEFA Cup, also earning a 1–0 victory against Borussia Mönchengladbach in the following round.

In 1980, Stănescu went for a second spell at Romania's national team, earning a 2–1 home victory and a 0–0 away draw against England in the 1982 World Cup qualifiers, totaling 35 games across both of his spells, consisting of 11 victories, 14 draws and 10 losses. From 1980 until 1982, he coached Dinamo București, simultaneously coaching Romania for the first year and a half of that period. He helped The Red Dogs win The Double in his second season and managed to become the first Romanian coach who eliminated Inter Milan with a 4–3 victory on aggregate in the second round of the 1981–82 UEFA Cup. In 1982, he returned to Rapid, helping them get promoted back to Divizia A after the club spent six years in Divizia B. Stănescu was the first coach who won the Romanian top-division, Divizia A, with three different clubs, having a total of 455 matches as a manager in the competition, consisting of 206 victories, 101 draws and 148 losses.

=== Famous speech ===
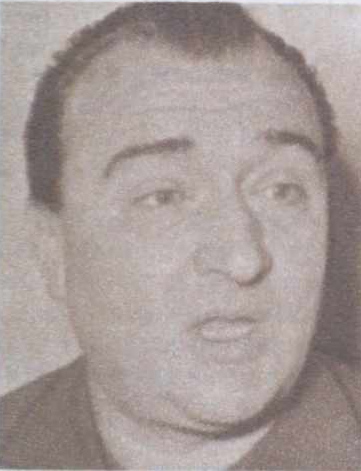

Stănescu admitted that he was most attached to Rapid București among all the clubs he worked for, delivering the following speech in front of the players during his tenure in the 1980s, which remained popular at the club over the years: "Hey guys, are you listening? Let me tell you how things are. Rapid is not yours, it is not mine or the ministry's. Rapid belongs to over 100,000 railway workers from all over the country. It belongs to them, to their wives and children, to those who came before us—hundreds of thousands more who are no longer here—and to those who will come after us. They are people who have worked and who are working so that you can kick a ball, study a book, and become someone in life. Do not disgrace Rapid! Whoever doesn't love the team has no choice—he will have to love it like his mother and father. Here are your mother and father, your home and table, your sister and brother, your lover, and everything—everything you hold sacred in the world! From now on I am your grandfather, but don't think that just because I'm 60 years old I have a softer hand. Whoever wants can leave now, because those who stay will only leave the ship feet first!".

== Death ==
Stănescu died on 4 April 1994 at the age of 71.

== Legacy ==
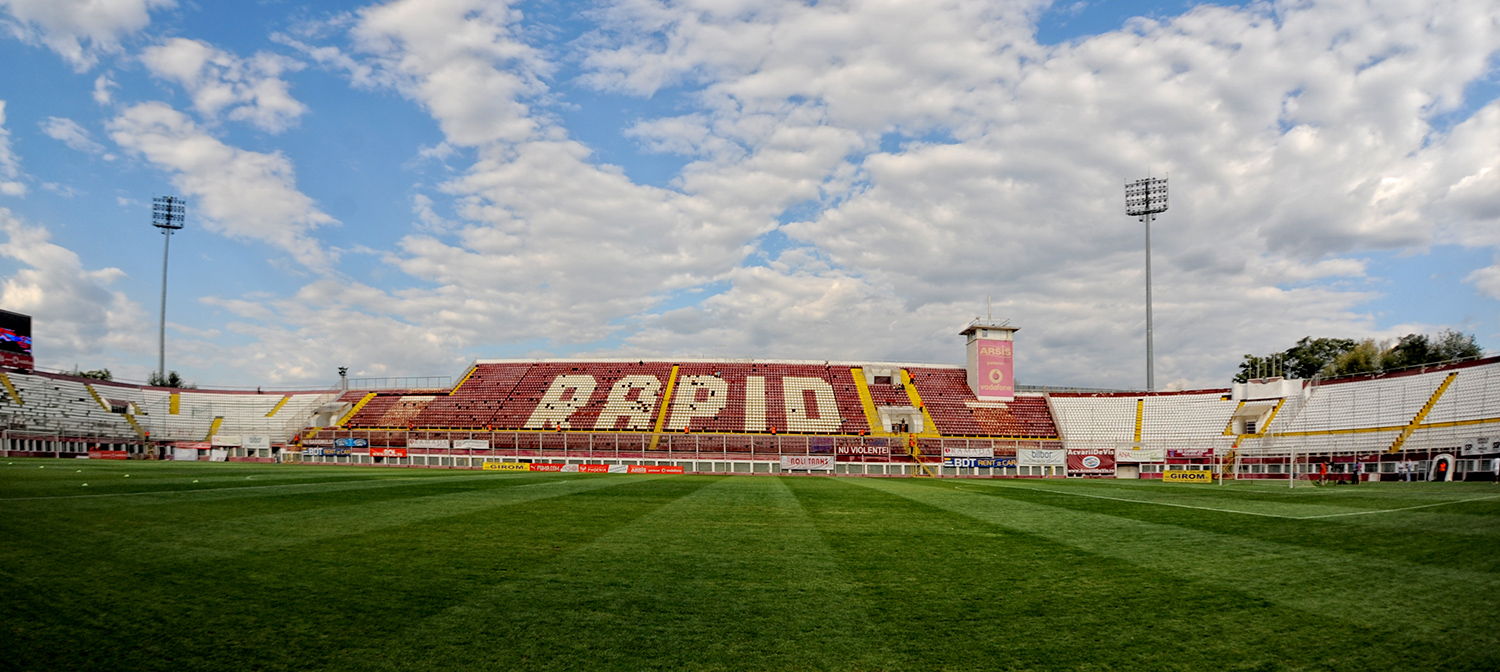
The old Rapid Bucharest stadium was named after him in 2001.

The Giulești-Valentin Stănescu Stadium was a football stadium in the Giulești neighborhood of Bucharest. The venue, named after him, was the home stadium of Rapid București for almost 80 years.

== Honours ==
=== Player ===
Sportul Studențesc București

- Cupa României runner-up: 1942–43

CFR București

- Divizia B: 1952

=== Manager ===
Metalul Târgoviște

- Divizia B: 1960–61
- Divizia C: 1958–59

Rapid București

- Divizia A: 1966–67
- Cupa României runner-up: 1967–68
- Balkans Cup: 1963–64, 1964–66
- Divizia B: 1982–83

Steagul Roșu Brașov

- Divizia B: 1968–69

Petrolul Ploiești

- Divizia B: 1976–77

Universitatea Craiova

- Divizia A: 1979–80

Dinamo București

- Divizia A: 1981–82
- Cupa României: 1981–82
