= 1981–82 Cupa României =

Tournament details
- Country: Romania

Final positions
- Champions: Dinamo București
- Runners-up: FC Baia Mare

The 1981–82 Cupa României was the 44th edition of Romania's most prestigious football cup competition.

The title was won by Dinamo București against FC Baia Mare.

== Format ==
The competition is an annual knockout tournament.

First round proper matches are played on the ground of the lowest ranked team, then from the second round proper the matches are played on a neutral location.

In the first round proper, if a match is drawn after 90 minutes, the game goes in extra time, if the scored is still tight after 120 minutes, the team who played away will qualify, if the teams are from the same league, then the winner will be established at penalty kicks.

From the second round proper, if a match is drawn after 90 minutes, the game goes in extra time, if the scored is still tight after 120 minutes, then the winner will be established at penalty kicks.

From the first edition, the teams from Divizia A entered in competition in sixteen finals, rule which remained till today.

== First round proper ==
Team 1	Score	Team 2
25 November 1981
Rapid Arad (Div. B)	1–2 (a.e.t.)	(Div. A) FC Constanţa
2 December 1981
Progresul Băileşti (Div. D)	0–3	(Div. A) Steaua București
Gloria Bistrița (Div. B)	2–0	(Div. A) Politehnica Timişoara
Progresul Brăila (Div. B)	1–2	(Div. A) Universitatea Cluj
Rapid București (Div. B)	3–0	(Div. A) Progresul Vulcan București
Gloria Buzău (Div. B)	2–1	(Div. A) UTA Arad
Minerul Certej (Div. C)	1–0	(Div. A) Jiul Petroşani
Muscelul Câmpulung (Div. C)	1–2	(Div. A) Chimia Râmnicu Vâlcea
Cimentul Medgidia (Div. C)	1–4	(Div. A) Dinamo București
Carpaţi Mârşa (Div. B)	2–1	(Div. A) ASA 1962 Târgu Mureș
Înfrăţirea Oradea (Div. B)	0–1	(Div. A) Universitatea Craiova
Olt Scornicești (Div. A)	0–0 (a.e.t.)(7–8 p)	(Div. A) CS Târgovişte
FCM Brașov (Div. A)	3–1	(Div. A) SC Bacău
CSM Suceava (Div. B)	0–0 (a.e.t.)	(Div. A) Argeş Piteşti
Victoria Tecuci (Div. B)	2–4	(Div. A) Corvinul Hunedoara
3 December 1981
FC Baia Mare (Div. B)	2–0	(Div. A) Sportul Studenţesc București

== Second round proper ==
Team 1	Score	Team 2
31 March 1982
Gloria Bistrița	3–2 (a.e.t.)	CS Târgovişte
Gloria Buzău	0–1	Rapid București
Chimia Râmnicu Vâlcea	4–0	Carpaţi Mârşa
Dinamo București	1–0	FC Constanţa
FCM Brașov	1–2	Corvinul Hunedoara
Argeş Piteşti	1–0	Steaua București
Universitatea Cluj	0–1 (a.e.t.)	FC Baia Mare
Minerul Certej	3–0 (forfait)	Universitatea Craiova ‡

Notes:

- ‡ The match was won by Universitatea Craiova with 5–0, but then homologated with 0–3.

== Quarter-finals ==
Team 1	Score	Team 2
26 May 1982
Corvinul Hunedoara	3–4	Dinamo București
Chimia Râmnicu Vâlcea	1–2	FC Baia Mare
Gloria Bistrița	3–0	Minerul Certej
Argeş Piteşti	2–1	Rapid București

== Semi-finals ==
Team 1	Score	Team 2
16 June 1982
Gloria Bistrița	0–1	Dinamo București
FC Baia Mare	1–1 (a.e.t.)(5-3 p)	Argeş Piteşti

== Final ==
20 June 1982
17:00 EET

Dinamo București	3–2	FC Baia Mare
Iordache 43'; Georgescu 58', 63'	Report	Dragomirescu 48'; Koller 83' (pen.)

23 August, Bucharest
Attendance: 15,000
Referee: Sever Drăgulici (Drobeta-Turnu Severin)

Cupa României 1981–82 winners

4th title
