= 1986–87 FC Dinamo București season =

FC Dinamo București
1986–87 season
- Manager: Mircea Lucescu
- Divizia A: 2nd
- Romanian Cup: Finalist
- Cup Winners' Cup: First round
- Top goalscorer: Rodion Cămătaru (44 goals)

The 1986–87 season was FC Dinamo București's 38th season in Divizia A. Mircea Lucescu begins the reconstruction of the team, with players from Dinamo own's yard (Ionuț Lupescu, Bogdan Stelea or Bogdan Bucur), but also with an important transfer campaign. Among others, in this season are brought Dănuț Lupu from Dunărea Galați, Dorin Mateuț from Corvinul and Rodion Cămătaru from Craiova. The latter will be the topscorer in the championship.

Dinamo finishes the season on the second place, but 15 points behind Steaua, who ends the season without a single loss. In the Romanian Cup, Dinamo loses the final, against the same Steaua. In Europe, Dinamo plays again after 18 years in the Cup Winner's Cup, but loses in the first round against Albanian team 17 Nentori Tirana.

== Results ==
Divizia A
Round	Date	Opponent	Stadium	Result
1	17 August 1986	FCM Brașov	A	1-0
2	24 August 1986	Gloria Buzău	H	10-2
3	31 August 1986	U Craiova	H	1-1
4	10 December 1986	FC Olt	A	0-0
5	21 September 1986	SC Bacău	H	4-1
6	26 September 1986	U Cluj	A	0-0
7	5 October 1986	Chimia Râmnicu Vâlcea	H	7-0
8	12 October 1986	Victoria București	A	1-1
9	18 October 1986	Petrolul Ploiești	H	3-0
10	26 November 1986	Steaua București	A	0-3
11	2 November 1986	FC Argeș	H	3-0
12	16 November 1986	Corvinul Hunedoara	A	5-3
13	20 November 1986	Oțelul Galați	H	2-0
14	23 November 1986	Flacăra Moreni	A	3-1
15	2 December 1986	Sportul Studențesc	H	0-1
16	7 December 1986	Jiul Petroșani	A	0-2
17	14 December 1986	Rapid București	H	2-0
18	8 March 1987	FCM Brașov	H	2-0
19	15 March 1987	Gloria Buzău	A	1-0
20	18 March 1987	U Craiova	A	1-1
21	29 March 1987	FC Olt	H	1-0
22	4 April 1987	SC Bacău	A	1-2
23	12 April 1987	U Cluj	H	2-0
24	22 April 1987	Chimia Râmnicu Vâlcea	A	4-1
25	3 May 1987	Victoria București	H	4-4
26	10 May 1987	Petrolul Ploiești	A	2-2
27	13 May 1987	Steaua București	H	1-1
28	24 May 1987	FC Argeș	A	2-0
29	30 May 1987	Corvinul Hunedoara	H	3-3
30	3 June 1987	Oțelul Galați	A	3-3
31	13 June 1987	Flacăra Moreni	H	2-3
32	18 June 1987	Sportul Studențesc	A	4-5
33	21 June 1987	Jiul Petroșani	H	6-2
34	25 June 1987	Rapid București	A	3-4

Cupa României
Round	Date	Opponent	Stadium	Result
Last 32	6 May 1987	Metalurgistul Cugir	A	4-1
Last 16	27 May 1987	Explorări Câmpulung-Moldovenesc	Focșani	4-0
Quarterfinals	16 June 1987	Oțelul Galați	Focșani	2-1
Semifinals	23 June 1987	Victoria București	București	4-2
Final	28 June 1987	Steaua București	București	0-1

== Romanian Cup final ==
25 June 1987
18:00

Dinamo București	0–1	Steaua București
		Bölöni 25'

Stadionul 23 August, Bucharest
Attendance: 60,000
Referee: Radu Petrescu (Braşov)

DINAMO:
GK	1.	Dumitru Moraru
DF	2.	Vasile Jercălău
DF	5.	Alexandru Nicolae	(substituted off) 46'
DF	7.	Lică Movilă
DF	3.	Ioan Varga
MF	11.	Dănuț Lupu
MF	6.	Ioan Andone	(red card) 90'
MF	4.	Mircea Rednic
MF	10.	Dorin Mateuț
FW	8.	Marian Damaschin
FW	9.	Rodion Cămătaru
Substitutes:
FW	14.	Costel Orac	(substituted in) 46'
Manager:
Mircea Lucescu

STEAUA:
GK	1.	Dumitru Stângaciu
DF	2.	Niță Cireașă	(substituted off) 46'
DF	6.	Ștefan Iovan
DF	4.	Miodrag Belodedici
DF	3.	Ilie Bărbulescu
MF	5.	Iosif Rotariu
MF	8.	Mihail Majearu	(substituted off) 68'
MF	11.	Ladislau Bölöni
MF	10.	Gheorghe Hagi
FW	9.	Victor Pițurcă
FW	7.	Marius Lăcătuș
Substitutes:
DF	15.	Anton Weissenbacher	(substituted in) 46'
MF	14.	Gavril Balint	(substituted in) 68'
Manager:
Anghel Iordănescu

== Cup Winners' Cup ==
First round

17 September 1986
17:30

17 Nentori Tirana	1–0	Dinamo București
Kola 86'

Qemal Stafa Stadium, Tirana
Attendance: 26,000
Referee: Tadeusz Diakonowicz (Poland)

1 October 1986
14:30

Dinamo București	1–2	17 Nentori Tirana
Cămătaru 80'		Minga 2'; Josa 90'

Stadionul Dinamo, Bucharest
Attendance: 20,000
Referee: Sotos Afxentiou (Cyprus)

17 Nentori Tirana won 3-1 on aggregate

== Squad ==
Goalkeepers: Dumitru Moraru, Benone Dohot, Florin Prunea, Bogdan Stelea, Florin Tene.

Defenders: Mircea Rednic, Ioan Andone, Alexandru Nicolae, Ioan Varga, Vasile Jercălău, Iulian Mihăescu, Bogdan Bucur, Nelu Stănescu, George Bănică, Virgil Mitici.

Midfielders: Ilie Balaci, Marin Dragnea, Dorin Mateuț, Lică Movilă, Dănuț Lupu, Ionuț Lupescu, Marcel Sabou, Alexandru Suciu, Nistor Văidean, Cristian Sava.

Forwards: Rodion Cămătaru, Marian Damaschin, Costel Orac, Florin Răducioiu.

== Transfers ==
Dinamo brought Ilie Balaci (FC Olt), Rodion Cămătaru (Univ. Craiova), Dorin Mateuț (Corvinul Hunedoara, in the winter break) and Dănuț Lupu (Dunărea Galați, in the winter break). Nelu Stănescu and Nistor Văidean were transferred to Flacăra Moreni (in the winter break). Stelea, Bogdan Bucur, Lupescu and Tene made their debuts.
