= 1985–86 FC Dinamo București season =

FC Dinamo București
1985–86 season
- Manager: Constantin Cernăianu (rounds 1-12), Florin Cheran (round 13), Mircea Lucescu (rounds 14-34)
- Divizia A: 4th
- Romanian Cup: Winner
- UEFA Cup: First round
- Top goalscorer: Costel Orac, Nistor Văidean (7 goals)

The 1985–86 season was FC Dinamo București's 37th season in Divizia A. This was the season when it started the Lucescu era for Dinamo. Mircea Lucescu was brought as manager in the 14th round. He won his first trophy at the end of the season, the Romanian Cup, beating Steaua in the final, the team that just became European champions.

In the championship, Dinamo started badly, and continued that way, ending only fourth. The results were not good in the European competitions either. In the UEFA Cup, Dinamo was eliminated in the first round, by the Yugoslavian side Vardar Skopje.

In the game versus FC Bihor, in the 33rd round, the assistant manager Florin Cheran, was introduced in the team because of the medical problems in the squad. Cheran was 39 years old and ended his football career four years before.

== Results ==
Divizia A
Round	Date	Opponent	Stadium	Result
1	4 August 1985	SC Bacău	A	1-0
2	11 August 1985	U Cluj	H	1-0
3	14 August 1985	Chimia Râmnicu Vâlcea	H	3-0
4	18 August 1985	Steaua București	A	0-1
5	1 September 1985	FC Olt	H	2-0
6	14 September 1985	FC Argeş	H	0-2
7	24 September 1985	Victoria București	H	3-2
8	28 September 1985	Petrolul Ploiești	A	0-0
9	5 October 1985	Rapid București	H	2-1
10	18 October 1985	Poli Timișoara	A	0-2
11	27 October 1985	FCM Brașov	H	4-0
12	1 November 1985	ASA Târgu Mureș	H	1-1
13	17 November 1985	U Craiova	A	0-0
14	20 November 1985	Sportul Studențesc	A	1-2
15	24 November 1985	FC Bihor	H	5-1
16	1 December 1985	Gloria Buzău	A	3-1
17	8 December 1985	Corvinul Hunedoara	H	0-0
18	8 March 1986	SC Bacău	H	3-1
19	11 March 1986	U Cluj	A	1-0
20	22 March 1986	Chimia Râmnicu Vâlcea	A	2-2
21	28 May 1986	Steaua București	H	2-1
22	2 April 1986	FC Olt	A	1-0
23	6 April 1986	FC Argeş	A	1-0
24	13 April 1986	Victoria București	A	0-0
25	19 April 1986	Petrolul Ploiești	H	1-0
26	27 April 1986	Rapid București	A	0-1
27	10 May 1986	Poli Timișoara	H	2-1
28	18 May 1986	FCM Brașov	A	0-1
29	21 May 1986	ASA Târgu Mureș	A	1-0
30	25 May 1986	U Craiova	H	4-0
31	31 May 1986	Sportul Studențesc	H	0-5
32	8 June 1986	FC Bihor	A	2-0
33	15 June 1986	Gloria Buzău	H	2-0
34	18 June 1986	Corvinul Hunedoara	A	1-2

Cupa României
Round	Date	Opponent	Stadium	Result
Last 32	5 December 1985	CS Târgoviște	A	2-0
Last 16	22 February 1986	U Cluj	Alba Iulia	3-1
Quarterfinals	14 May 1986	U Craiova	Pitești	4-2 (pen.)
Semifinals	21 June 1986	Victoria București	București	4-2
Final	25 June 1986	Steaua București	București	1-0

Cupa României 1985–86 Winners
Dinamo București
6th Title

== Romanian Cup final ==
25 June 1986
18:00

Dinamo București	1–0	Steaua București
Damaschin 71'

Stadionul 23 August, Bucharest
Attendance: 40,000
Referee: Radu Petrescu (Brașov)

DINAMO:
GK	Dumitru Moraru
DF	Ioan Varga
DF	Alexandru Nicolae
DF	Lică Movilă
DF	Nelu Stănescu	(substituted off) 46'
MF	Mircea Rednic
MF	Marin Dragnea
MF	Ioan Andone
FW	Alexandru Suciu
FW	Marian Damaschin
FW	Costel Orac
Substitutes:
DF	Iulian Mihăescu	(substituted in) 46'	(substituted off) 89'
DF	Nistor Văidean	(substituted in) 89'
Manager:
Mircea Lucescu

STEAUA:
GK	Helmut Duckadam
DF	Ștefan Iovan
DF	Adrian Bumbescu
DF	Miodrag Belodedici
DF	Ilie Bărbulescu
MF	Gavril Balint
MF	Tudorel Stoica
MF	Ladislau Bölöni
MF	Mihail Majearu	(substituted off) 75'
FW	Victor Pițurcă
FW	Marius Lăcătuș
Substitutes:
MF	Lucian Bălan	(substituted in) 75'
Manager:
Emeric Ienei

== UEFA Cup ==
First round

18 September 1985
17:00

Dinamo București	2–1	Vardar Skopje
Rednic 28'; Augustin 50' (pen.)		Pančev 9'

Stadionul Dinamo, Bucharest
Attendance: 15,000
Referee: Valeri Butenko (Soviet Union)

2 October 1985
14:30

Vardar Skopje	1–0	Dinamo București
Zdravkov 46'

Gradski Stadion Skopje, Skopje
Attendance: 10,000
Referee: Dieter Pauly (West Germany)

FK Vardar Skopje won 2-2 on aggregate due to away goals

== Squad ==
Goalkeepers: Dumitru Moraru, Constantin Eftimescu, Florin Prunea, Ioan Bucu.

Defenders: Mircea Rednic, Ioan Andone, Alexandru Nicolae, Nelu Stănescu, Vasile Jercălău, Iulian Mihăescu, Ioan Varga, Virgil Mitici, Dan Topolinschi, Niculae Ivan.

Midfielders: Ionel Augustin, Marin Dragnea, Lică Movilă, Ioan Zare, Daniel Sava, Alexandru Suciu.

Forwards: Marian Damaschin, Costel Orac, Gheorghe Tulba, Sorin Răducanu, Nistor Văidean, Florin Răducioiu.

== Transfers ==
Dinamo brought Nistor Văidean (FCM Brașov), Marian Damaschin (Poli Iași). Cornel Țălnar is transferred to FCM Brașov, Nicușor Vlad, Teofil Stredie and Ionel Augustin to Victoria București. Vasile Jercălău, Florin Răducioiu and Florin Prunea make their debuts.
