= 1989–90 FC Dinamo București season =

FC Dinamo București
1989–90 season
- Manager: Mircea Lucescu
- Divizia A: 1st
- Romanian Cup: Winners
- UEFA Cup Winners' Cup: Semi-finals
- Top goalscorer: Florin Răducioiu; Claudiu Vaișcovici (14 each)

The 1989–90 season was FC Dinamo București's 41st season in Divizia A. In this season, Dinamo made the double, stopping Steaua's supremacy in Romania. In Europe, Dinamo reached the semifinals of the Cup Winners' Cup, where it is defeated by Anderlecht. It was a special season because of the Romanian Revolution of 1989. Dinamo dominated the first half of the season, winning the derby with Steaua, 3–0, on its ground. It was the first defeat for Steaua in the Romanian championship after 104 consecutive games. In the winter break, after the Revolution, Dinamo suffered administrative changes, for a few days having a different name – Unirea Tricolor.

In the final of the season, because of the Romanian national team's qualification at the 1990 World Cup in Italy, FRF decided that the teams shall not use the chooseable players. However, in the game between Dinamo and Farul, Răducioiu and Lupu, respectively Marian Popa had played, managers and coaches of both clubs (Vasile Ianul and Lucescu for Dinamo) were suspended for three months, and the match, won by Dinamo 2-1 was replayed. To stay on the bench next stage Lucescu registered as a player, and even took the field, becoming at 45 years old, the oldest player in league history.

== Results ==
Divizia A
Round	Date	Opponent	Stadium	Result
1	23 August 1989	FC Argeş	A	2–0
2	27 August 1989	Inter Sibiu	H	6–1
3	9 September 1989	Steaua București	A	3–0
4	17 September 1989	Petrolul Ploiești	H	5–0
5	20 September 1989	Poli Timișoara	A	1–0
6	1 October 1989	Corvinul Hunedoara	H	3–0
7	4 October 1989	Jiul Petroșani	A	2–0
8	14 October 1989	SC Bacău	H	7–1
9	22 October 1989	Victoria București	A	4–1
10	28 October 1989	FCM Brașov	H	4–0
11	5 November 1989	U Craiova	A	0–1
12	19 November 1989	Sportul Studențesc	H	3–2
13	26 November 1989	FC Bihor	A	2–0
14	29 November 1989	FC Olt	H	4–0
15	3 December 1989	Flacăra Moreni	A	2–1
16	5 December 1989	U Cluj	H	6–1
17	10 December 1989	Farul Constanța	A	3–0
18	25 February 1990	FC Argeş	H	2–0
19	2 March 1990	Inter Sibiu	A	0–1
20	15 March 1990	Steaua București	H	2–2
21	25 March 1990	Petrolul Ploiești	A	1–1
22	8 April 1990	Poli Timișoara	H	3–0
23	21 April 1990	Jiul Petroșani	H	3–0
24	29 April 1990	U Craiova	H	5–3
25	5 June 1990	SC Bacău	A	1–1
26	6 May 1990	Victoria București	H	3–0
27	9 May 1990	FCM Brașov	A	2–2
28	16 May 1990	Sportul Studențesc	A	1–1
29	19 May 1990	FC Bihor	H	6–1
30	27 May 1990	Corvinul Hunedoara	A	0–1
31	23 May 1990	FC Olt	A	3–0
32	30 May 1990	Flacăra Moreni	H	2–1
33	2 June 1990	U Cluj	A	1–0
34	7 June 1990	Farul Constanța	H	4–1

Divizia A 1989–90 Winners
Dinamo București
13th Title

Cupa României
Round	Date	Opponent	Stadium	Result
Last 16	27 February 1990	Jiul Petroșani	Alba Iulia	2–0
Quarterfinals	11 March 1990	Poli Timișoara	Hunedoara	3–1
Semifinals	11 April 1990	U Craiova	București	4-3 (p)
Final	2 May 1990	Steaua București	București	6–4

Cupa României 1989–90 Winners
Dinamo București
7th Title

== Romanian Cup final ==
2 May 1990
17:00

Dinamo București	6–4	Steaua București
Răducioiu 3' (42), 82'; Mateuț 39'; Sabău 47'; Lupu 56'		Dumitrescu 22'; Lăcătuș 68'; Rotariu 70'; Ungureanu 85'

Stadionul 23 August, Bucharest
Attendance: 30,000
Referee: Mircea Salomir (Cluj-Napoca)

DINAMO:
GK	Bogdan Stelea
DF	Anton Doboș	(substituted off) 57'
DF	Mircea Rednic
DF	Ioan Andone
DF	Michael Klein
MF	Ionuț Lupescu
MF	Ioan Ovidiu Sabău
MF	Dorin Mateuț	(substituted off) 65'
MF	Dănuț Lupu
FW	Claudiu Vaișcovici
FW	Florin Răducioiu
Substitutes:
DF	Daniel Timofte	(substituted in) 57'
MF	Ionel Fulga	(substituted in) 65'
Manager:
Mircea Lucescu

STEAUA:
GK	Daniel Gherasim
DF	Lucian Ciocan
DF	Adrian Negrău
DF	Alin Artimon	(substituted off) 57'
DF	Nicolae Ungureanu
MF	Daniel Minea
MF	Zsolt Muzsnay
MF	Iosif Rotariu
MF	Ilie Dumitrescu
FW	Marius Lăcătuș
FW	Gavril Balint	(substituted off) 57'
Substitutes:
MF	Ilie Stan	(substituted in) 57'
FW	Gheorghe Pena	(substituted in) 57'
Manager:
Anghel Iordănescu

== Cup Winners' Cup ==
First round

13 September 1989
17:30

Dinamo Tirana	1–0	Dinamo București
Canaj 52'

Qemal Stafa, Tirana
Attendance: 25,000
Referee: Tadeusz Diakonowicz (Poland)

26 September 1989
15:30

Dinamo București	2–0	Dinamo Tirana
Mateuţ 8'; Mihăescu 13'

Stadionul Dinamo, Bucharest
Attendance: 25,000
Referee: Zoran Petrović (Yugoslavia)

Dinamo București won 2–1 on aggregate

Second round

18 October 1989
20:00

Panathinaikos F.C.	0–2	Dinamo București
		Răducioiu 57'; Mateuţ 66'

Olympic Stadium, Athens
Attendance: 50,000
Referee: Dieter Pauli (West Germany)

1 November 1989
14:00

Dinamo București	6–1	Panathinaikos F.C.
Rednic 21'; Mateuţ 31', 48'; Sabău 40', 50'; Klein 89'		Samaras 34'

Stadionul Dinamo, Bucharest
Attendance: 22,000
Referee: Kurt Röthlisberger (Switzerland)

Dinamo București won 8–1 on aggregate

Quarterfinals

7 March 1990
15:00

Dinamo București	2–1	Partizan Belgrade
Răducioiu 18', 57'		Spasic 68'

Stadionul Dinamo, Bucharest
Attendance: 12,000
Referee: Dusan Krchnak (Czechoslovakia)

21 March 1990
16:00

Partizan Belgrade	0–2	Dinamo București
		Lupescu 53'; Răducioiu 70'

Buducnost Stadium, Titograd
Attendance: 15,000
Referee: José Rosa Dos Santos (Portugal)

Dinamo București won 4–1 on aggregate

Semifinals

4 April 1990
20:00

Anderlecht	1–0	Dinamo București
Nilis 66'

Constant Vanden Stock Stadium, Anderlecht, Brussels
Attendance: 15,000
Referee: Aron Schmidhuber (West Germany)

18 April 1990
20:00

Dinamo București	0–1	Anderlecht
		Vanderlinden 60'

Stadionul 23 August, Bucharest
Attendance: 45,000
Referee: John Blankenstein (Netherlands)

Anderlecht won 2-0 on aggregate

== Squad ==
Goalkeepers: Bogdan Stelea (22 / 0); Costel Câmpeanu (10 / 0); Sorin Colceag (1 / 0).
Defenders: Alpár Mészáros (15 / 1); Ioan Andone (20 / 2); Mircea Rednic (19 / 1); Michael Klein (23 / 2); Iulian Mihăescu (24 / 7); Anton Doboș (21 / 1); Adrian Matei (10 / 0); Florin Jelea (1 / 0); Adrian Slave (1 / 0); Cornel Mirea (12 / 0); Alexandru Nicolae (5 / 0); Mihail Cristian Țicu (3 / 0); Claudiu Jijie (1 / 0).
Midfielders: Ioan Sabău (24 / 5); Dorin Mateuț (22 / 9); Ioan Lupescu (29 / 4); Dănuț Lupu (22 / 6); Daniel Timofte (20 / 8); Cristian Lazăr (11 / 2); Ionel Fulga (7 / 3); Mihai Stoica (7 / 0); George Radu (5 / 0).
Forwards: Claudiu Vaișcovici (21 / 14); Cezar Zamfir (21 / 6); Florin Răducioiu (24 / 14); Marian Damaschin (5 / 1); Mircea Lucescu (1 / 0); Marian Năstase (3 / 0); Nicu Glonț (1 / 0).
(league appearances and goals listed in brackets)

Manager: Mircea Lucescu.

== Transfers ==
In the summer break, Dinamo brought Daniel Timofte from Jiul Petroșani and Anton Doboș from U.Cluj. Left the team Lică Movilă to Flacăra Moreni, Bogdan Bucur to Inter Sibiu, Rodion Cămătaru to Racing Charleroi and Dumitru Moraru to Vålerenga. Other two players, Gheorghe Viscreanu and Marcel Sabou, went to Spain. In the winter break, came to Dinamo Alexandru Nicolae from Victoria, Cristian Lazăr from Chimia Râmnicu Vâlcea and Mihai Stoica from FC Argeş.

== Squad set for Torneo di Viareggio - 1989 ==
Paul Barariu, Adrian Bondoc, Corneliu Buțerchi, Sorin Colceag, Vasile Ghernescu, Vicentiu Iorgulescu, Răzvan Lucescu, Marian Năstase, Catalin Necula, Cristian Petre, Gabriel Răduță, Cristian Serban, Adrian Slave, Constantin Stănici, Mihail Țicu, Adrian Titeica. Team Manager: Tatasescu
