= 1987–88 FC Dinamo București season =

FC Dinamo București
1987–88 season
- Manager: Mircea Lucescu
- Divizia A: 2nd
- Romanian Cup: Finalist
- Cup Winners' Cup: First round
- Top goalscorer: Claudiu Vaişcovici (27 goals)

The 1987–88 season was FC Dinamo București's 39th season in Divizia A. Dinamo had a perfect start in the championship, winning the first ten games. In the 11th round came the first and only defeat of the season, against Politehnica Timişoara. Despite that, Dinamo finished second, behind Steaua. In the Romanian Cup, Dinamo reached the final, where it met Steaua. The final had an unusual development. Steaua scored first, Dinamo equalised in the 87 minute, and in the additional time Steaua scored a goal, invalidated by the referee, due to offside. Steaua players left the field, Dinamo was given the trophy, but later the Romanian F.A. (bowing to pressure from the Communist Party) awarded the match 2–1 to Steaua. After the revolution of December 1989, Steaua propositioned to return the trophy to Dinamo, which refused to take it.

In Europe, Dinamo was eliminated in the first round of the Cup Winners Cup, by the future winner of the competition, KV Mechelen.

== Results ==
Divizia A
Round	Date	Opponent	Stadium	Result
1	23 August 1987	Petrolul Ploiești	H	5-0
2	26 August 1987	FCM Brașov	A	2-0
3	6 September 1987	Sportul Studențesc	H	2-1
4	10 September 1987	Flacăra Moreni	A	1-0
5	20 September 1987	FC Argeș	H	4-0
6	23 September 1987	Victoria București	A	3-2
7	4 October 1987	ASA Târgu Mureș	H	2-1
8	11 October 1987	SC Bacău	A	2-1
9	17 October 1987	U Craiova	H	3-1
10	31 October 1987	CSM Suceava	A	3-1
11	8 November 1987	Poli Timișoara	A	1-2
12	24 November 1987	U Cluj	H	4-0
13	28 November 1987	Rapid București	A	1-0
14	2 December 1987	Steaua București	H	0-0
15	6 December 1987	Corvinul Hunedoara	A	3-2
16	13 December 1987	Oțelul Galați	H	3-1
17	17 December 1987	FC Olt Scornicești	A	0-0
18	6 March 1988	Petrolul Ploiești	A	2-0
19	13 March 1988	FCM Brașov	H	5-1
20	19 March 1988	Sportul Studențesc	A	2-1
21	3 April 1988	Flacăra Moreni	H	2-0
22	9 April 1988	FC Argeș	A	3-0
23	17 April 1988	Victoria București	H	2-0
24	24 April 1988	ASA Târgu Mureș	A	2-0
25	27 April 1988	SC Bacău	H	3-1
26	1 May 1988	U Craiova	A	3-1
27	8 May 1988	CSM Suceava	H	9-1
28	14 May 1988	Poli Timișoara	H	6-0
29	22 May 1988	U Cluj	A	4-1
30	25 May 1988	Rapid București	H	5-2
31	8 June 1988	Steaua București	A	3-3
32	12 June 1988	Corvinul Hunedoara	H	8-2
33	19 June 1988	Oțelul Galați	A	3-0
34	22 June 1988	FC Olt Scornicești	H	6-0

Cupa României
Round	Date	Opponent	Stadium	Result
Last 32	28 February 1988	Montana Sinana	A	2-1
Last 16	4 May 1988	Progresul Brăila	Buzău	4-1
Quarterfinals	5 June 1988	Corvinul Hunedoara	Brașov	4-2
Semifinals	15 June 1988	Victoria București	București	4-2
Final	26 June 1988	Steaua București	București	1-2

== Romanian Cup final ==
26 June 1988
19:00

Dinamo București	1–2	Steaua București
Răducioiu 87'		Lăcătuş 27'; Balint 90'

Stadionul 23 August, Bucharest
Attendance: 45,000
Referee: Radu Petrescu (Braşov)

DINAMO:
GK	Dumitru Moraru
DF	Iulian Mihăescu	(substituted off) 46'
DF	Mircea Rednic
DF	Ioan Andone
DF	Ioan Varga
MF	Dănuț Lupu
MF	Ionuț Lupescu
MF	Dorin Mateuț
MF	Costel Orac	(substituted off) 82'
FW	Rodion Cămătaru
FW	Claudiu Vaișcovici
Substitutes:
DF	Lică Movilă	(substituted in) 46'
FW	Florin Răducioiu	(substituted in) 82'
Manager:
Mircea Lucescu

STEAUA:
GK	Gheorghe Liliac
DF	Ștefan Iovan
DF	Adrian Bumbescu
DF	Miodrag Belodedici
DF	Iosif Rotariu
MF	Lucian Bălan
MF	Tudorel Stoica
MF	Gheorghe Popescu
MF	Gheorghe Hagi
FW	Victor Pițurcă	(substituted off) 52'
FW	Marius Lăcătuș
Substitutes:
FW	Gavril Balint	(substituted in) 52'
Manager:
Anghel Iordănescu

== Cup Winners' Cup ==
First round

16 September 1987
20:00

KV Mechelen	1–0	Dinamo București
Den Boer 50'

Argosstadion Achter de Kazerne, Mechelen
Attendance: 12,000
Referee: Urizar Aspitarte (Spain)

30 September 1987
15:30

Dinamo București	0–2	KV Mechelen
		Hofkens 39'; Den Boer 71'

Stadionul Dinamo, Bucharest
Attendance: 20,000
Referee: Pietro D'Elia (Italy)

KV Mechelen won 3-0 on aggregate

== Squad ==
Goalkeepers: Dumitru Moraru, Florin Prunea, Bogdan Stelea.

Defenders: Iulian Mihăescu, Ioan Andone, Mircea Rednic, Ioan Varga, Lică Movilă, Alexandru Nicolae, Bogdan Bucur, Vasile Jercălău.

Midfielders: Ionuț Lupescu, Dănuț Lupu, Dorin Mateuț, Costel Orac, Ilie Balaci, Gheorghe Dumitrașcu, Marcel Sabou, George Timiș, Mihai Stoica, Mario Marinică.

Forwards: Rodion Cămătaru, Claudiu Vaișcovici, Marian Damaschin, Florin Răducioiu.

== Transfers ==
Dinamo brought Claudiu Vaișcovici in the winter break. The striker bought from Victoria București scored 22 goals for Dinamo in the second part of the championship.
