= 1988–89 FC Dinamo București season =

FC Dinamo București
1988–89 season
- Manager: Mircea Lucescu
- Divizia A: 2nd
- Romanian Cup: Runners-up
- European Cup Winners' Cup: Quarter-finals
- Top goalscorer: Dorin Mateuţ (43 goals)

The 1988–89 season was FC Dinamo București's 40th season in Divizia A. After a couple of seasons in the European competitions without remarkable results, Dinamo qualified in the quarterfinals of the Cup Winners' Cup. Their opponents were Sampdoria Genoa, an Italian squad. The two games ended with draws, but Sampdoria moved forward due to an away goal. In the internal competitions, Dinamo could not interrupt Steaua's dominance, ending the championship in second place and losing the Romanian Cup final. Dorin Mateuţ won the European Golden Boot with 43 goals that were scored in the championship game.

== Results ==
Divizia A
Round	Date	Opponent	Stadium	Result
1	21 August 1988	SC Bacău	A	3–1
2	28 August 1988	Victoria București	H	3–1
3	31 August 1988	FC Bihor	A	2–1
4	11 September 1988	Inter Sibiu	H	8–1
5	14 September 1988	FC Argeș	A	2–1
6	17 September 1988	Rapid București	H	6–0
7	25 September 1988	Sportul Studențesc	A	4–1
8	28 September 1988	U Cluj	H	4–1
9	9 October 1988	U Craiova	A	6–3
10	12 October 1988	FC Olt	H	6–0
11	5 November 1988	Flacăra Moreni	H	3–1
12	13 November 1988	Corvinul Hunedoara	A	2–1
13	19 November 1988	ASA Târgu Mureș	H	7–0
14	27 November 1988	FCM Brașov	A	3–1
15	3 December 1988	Steaua București	H	0–0
16	7 December 1988	Farul Constanța	A	7–0
17	11 December 1988	Oțelul Galați	H	6–3
18	5 March 1989	Oțelul Galați	A	2–0
19	8 March 1989	Farul Constanța	H	6–0
20	22 March 1989	Steaua București	A	1–2
21	2 April 1989	FCM Brașov	H	3–0
22	9 April 1989	ASA Târgu Mureș	A	7–2
23	16 April 1989	Corvinul Hunedoara	H	3–1
24	30 April 1989	Flacăra Moreni	A	5–1
25	3 May 1989	FC Olt	A	0–1
26	6 May 1989	U Craiova	H	2–0
27	10 May 1989	U Cluj	A	3–0
28	28 May 1989	Sportul Studențesc	H	6–1
29	3 June 1989	Rapid București	A	6–2
30	6 June 1989	FC Argeș	H	1–0
31	11 June 1989	Inter Sibiu	A	4–2
32	14 June 1989	FC Bihor	H	5–1
33	17 June 1989	Victoria București	A	4–1
34	20 June 1989	SC Bacău	H	0–0

Cupa României
Round	Date	Opponent	Stadium	Result
Last 32	22 February 1989	Progresul Medgidia	A	2–1
Last 16	8 June 1989	Inter Sibiu	Alba Iulia	1–0
Quarterfinals	22 June 1989	SC Bacău	Buzău	5–1
Semifinals	25 June 1989	Victoria București	Brăila	2–0
Final	29 June 1989	Steaua București	Brașov	0–1

== Romanian Cup final ==
29 June 1989
17:00

Dinamo București	0–1	Steaua București
		Hagi 67'

Stadionul Municipal, Braşov
Attendance: 35,000
Referee: Dan Petrescu (Bucharest)

DINAMO:
GK	Bogdan Stelea
DF	Ioan Varga
DF	Mircea Rednic
DF	Ioan Andone
DF	Michael Klein
MF	Dorin Mateuț
MF	Ionuț Lupescu	(substituted off) 46'
MF	Dănuț Lupu
MF	Iulian Mihăescu
FW	Rodion Cămătaru	(substituted off) 78'
FW	Claudiu Vaișcovici
Substitutes:
MF	Costel Orac	(substituted on) 46'
FW	Florin Răducioiu	(substituted on) 78'
Manager:
Mircea Lucescu

STEAUA:
GK	Silviu Lung
DF	Dan Petrescu
DF	Ștefan Iovan
DF	Adrian Bumbescu
DF	Iosif Rotariu
MF	Tudorel Stoica
MF	Daniel Minea	(substituted off) 84'
MF	Ilie Dumitrescu
MF	Gheorghe Hagi
FW	Victor Pițurcă
FW	Marius Lăcătuș	(substituted off) 85'
Substitutes:
MF	Ilie Stan	(substituted on) 84'
FW	Gavril Balint	(substituted on) 85'
Manager:
Anghel Iordănescu

== Cup Winners' Cup ==
First round

7 September 1988
17:00

Dinamo București	3–0	Kuusysi Lahti
Jäntti 12' (o.g.); Andone 72'; Vaişcovici 74'

Stadionul Dinamo, Bucharest
Attendance: 18,000
Referee: Stephanos Hadjistephanou (Cyprus)

5 October 1988
19:00

Kuusysi Lahti	0–3	Dinamo București
		Vaişcovici 11' (pen.); Kousa 34' (o.g.); Răducioiu 71' (pen.)

Ehden, Lahti
Attendance: 5,000
Referee: Aleksandr Kokriakov (Soviet Union)

Dinamo București won 6–0 on aggregate

Second round

26 October 1988
19:30

Dundee United	0–1	Dinamo București
		Mateuţ 89'

Tannadice Park, Dundee
Attendance: 20,000
Referee: Guy Goethals (Belgium)

9 November 1988
13:30

Dinamo București	1–1	Dundee United
Mateuţ 82'		Beaumont 79'

Stadionul Dinamo, Bucharest
Attendance: 20,000
Referee: Albert Thomas (Netherlands)

Dinamo București won 2–1 on aggregate

Quarterfinals

1 March 1989
14:30

Dinamo București	1–1	Sampdoria
Vaişcovici 16' (pen.)		Vialli 90'

Stadionul Dinamo, Bucharest
Attendance: 20,000
Referee: Horst Brummeier (Austria)

15 March 1989
16:45

Sampdoria	0–0	Dinamo București

Stadio Giovanni Zini, Cremona
Attendance: 17,652
Referee: Lajos Nemeth (Hungary)

Sampdoria won 1–1 on aggregate due to away goal

== Squad ==
Goalkeepers: Dumitru Moraru, Bogdan Stelea, Sorin Colceag.

Defenders: Iulian Mihăescu, Ioan Andone, Mircea Rednic, Michael Klein, Adrian Matei, Alexandru Nicolae, Ioan Varga, Bogdan Bucur, Adrian Nicoară.

Midfielders: Ionuț Lupescu, Dănuț Lupu, Dorin Mateuț, Costel Orac, Ioan Ovidiu Sabău, Marcel Sabou, Gheorghe Viscreanu, Daniel Sava, Mihai Stoica.

Forwards: Rodion Cămătaru, Claudiu Vaișcovici, Florin Răducioiu, Romeo Dochia, George Timiș.

== Transfers ==
Dinamo brought Gheorghe Viscreanu from Flacăra Moreni and Ioan Ovidiu Sabău from ASA Târgu Mureș. In the winter break Dinamo brought Michael Klein from Corvinul Hunedoara and Adrian Matei from Rapid. Florin Prunea is loaned to U.Cluj.
