= 1983–84 FC Dinamo București season =

FC Dinamo București
1983–84 season
- Manager: Dumitru Nicolae Nicuşor
- Divizia A: 1st
- Romanian Cup: Winner
- European Cup: Semifinals
- Top goalscorer: Ionel Augustin (17 goals)

The 1983–84 season was FC Dinamo București's 35th season in Divizia A. In this season, Dinamo made their best ever performance at the European level, reaching the semi-finals of the European Cup.

Dinamo's opponents in the first round were Finnish champions Kuusysi. Dinamo Bucharest won the first leg 1–0 away and the second leg 3–0 at home, thus winning the round 4–0 on aggregate. The Romanians' opponents in the second round were reigning European champions Hamburg. The first leg, which was played in Bucharest, was won by Dinamo 3–0. The second leg was played at Hamburg's home ground Volksparkstadion; Hamburg won the match 3–2, ("Dinamo ruined their [Hamburg's] evening with two goals in the last five minutes to send the holders crashing out at the first hurdle") which meant that Dinamo took the tie 5–3 on aggregate. Dinamo Bucharest's opponents in the quarter-finals were Soviet champions Dinamo Minsk. The first leg, played in Minsk, ended in a 1–1 draw. The second leg, played in Bucharest, was a close contest, but Dinamo Bucharest won 1–0 to take the tie 2–1 on aggregate.

The semi-final between Liverpool and Dinamo Bucharest was held over two legs in Liverpool and Bucharest, on 11 April 1984 and 25 April 1984, respectively. It was the first meeting between the two clubs. Liverpool won the first leg by the narrow margin of 1–0 after midfielder Sammy Lee scored. Dinamo nearly scored a late equaliser when a shot by Ionel Augustin beat Bruce Grobbelaar only to hit the post. The physical and aggressive nature of the Anfield encounter reached a peak in the seventieth minute, when the Liverpool midfield player and captain Graeme Souness knocked out in an off the ball incident his Dinamo counterpart Lică Movilă, breaking the Romanian's jaw in two places.

Liverpool secured a great advantage early on in the return leg when striker Ian Rush scored an away goal in the eleventh minute, leaving the Romanian champions needing three goals to win the tie thanks to the away goals rule. Dinamo striker Costel Orac scored in the thirty-ninth minute, but the tie was effectively killed off in the eighty-fourth minute when Rush scored a second goal.

At the beginning of the season, Cornel Dinu retired from the footballer career after 17 years spent only with Dinamo Bucharest. At that time, Dinu had two records for the Romanian football, the most capped player in the Romania national football team, with 75 matches, and the most capped player in Divizia A, with 454 matches. In this season, Dinu was the assistant manager for Nicolae-Nicuşor.

== Results ==
Divizia A
Round	Date	Opponent	Stadium	Result
1	28 August 1983	Chimia Râmnicu Vâlcea	H	2-0
2	3 September 1983	Poli Iași	A	0-0
3	10 September 1983	Petrolul Ploiești	H	4-0
4	18 September 1983	Rapid București	A	2-1
5	24 September 1983	Dunărea Galați	A	0-0
6	1 October 1983	FC Baia Mare	H	4-1
7	9 October 1983	FC Olt	A	0-1
8	7 December 1983	U Craiova	H	2-1
9	22 October 1983	Steaua București	H	0-3
10	20 December 1983	FC Argeş	A	1-1
11	23 December 1983	Corvinul Hunedoara	H	4-2
12	16 November 1983	CS Târgoviște	A	3-2
13	19 November 1983	ASA Târgu Mureș	H	3-0
14	4 December 1983	Sportul Studențesc	A	3-0
15	10 December 1983	Jiul Petroșani	A	1-1
16	14 December 1983	FC Bihor	H	3-1
17	17 December 1983	SC Bacău	A	1-1
18	18 February 1984	Chimia Râmnicu Vâlcea	A	1-1
19	21 February 1984	Poli Iași	H	4-1
20	26 February 1984	Petrolul Ploiești	A	0-0
21	29 February 1984	Rapid București	H	1-0
22	11 March 1984	Dunărea Galați	H	3-1
23	14 March 1984	FC Baia Mare	A	2-2
24	8 May 1984	FC Olt	H	3-1
25	1 April 1984	U Craiova	A	0-3
26	16 May 1984	Steaua București	A	1-1
27	19 May 1984	FC Argeş	H	1-0
28	15 April 1984	Corvinul Hunedoara	A	2-2
29	22 April 1984	CS Târgoviște	H	3-0
30	27 May 1984	ASA Târgu Mureș	A	1-1
31	29 April 1984	Sportul Studențesc	H	3-1
32	2 May 1984	Jiul Petroșani	H	6-2
33	5 May 1984	FC Bihor	A	1-4
34	13 May 1984	SC Bacău	H	4-1

Divizia A 1983–84 Winners
Dinamo București
12th Title

Cupa României
Round	Date	Opponent	Stadium	Result
Last 32	12 February 1984	Petrolul Moinești	A	4-1
Last 16	3 March 1984	FC Olt	Ploiești	2-0
Quarterfinals	18 April 1984	Petrolul Ploiești	Brașov	4-2
Semifinals	11 May 1984	Sportul Studențesc	București	2-0
Final	22 May 1984	Steaua București	București	2-1

Cupa României 1983–84 Winners
Dinamo București
5th Title

== Romanian Cup final ==
22 May 1984
17:00

Dinamo București	2–1	Steaua București
Custov 45'; Orac 53'		Lăcătuș 10'

Stadionul 23 August, Bucharest
Attendance: 60,000
Referee: Dan Petrescu (București)

DINAMO:
GK	Dumitru Moraru
DF	Mircea Rednic
DF	Alexandru Nicolae
DF	Ion Marin
DF	Nelu Stănescu	(substituted off) 24'
MF	Marin Dragnea
MF	Ioan Andone
MF	Alexandru Custov
FW	Cornel Țălnar
FW	Ionel Augustin
FW	Costel Orac
Substitutes:
FW	Ioan Mărginean	(substituted in) 24'
Manager:
Dumitru Nicolae Nicuşor

STEAUA:
GK	Helmut Duckadam
DF	Nicolae Laurențiu
DF	Florin Marin
DF	Miodrag Belodedici
DF	Augustin Eduard
MF	Mihail Majearu
MF	Tudorel Stoica
MF	Ștefan Petcu	(substituted off) 60'
FW	Marius Lăcătuș
FW	Victor Pițurcă	(substituted off) 65'
FW	Gavril Pelé Balint
Substitutes:
MF	Ioan Diaconescu	(substituted in) 60'
FW	Septimiu Câmpeanu	(substituted in) 65'
Manager:
Emeric Ienei

== European Cup ==
First round

14 September 1983
18:00

Kuusysi Lahti	0–1	Dinamo București
		Dragnea 49'

Central Stadion, Lahti
Attendance: 1,000
Referee: Ulf Eriksson (Sweden)

28 September 1983
15:00

Dinamo București	3–0	Kuusysi Lahti
Movilă 47'; Augustin 70'; Mulţescu 89'

Stadionul Dinamo, Bucharest
Attendance: 10,000
Referee: Sotos Afxentiou (Cyprus)

Dinamo București won 4-0 on aggregate

Second round

19 October 1983
18:00

Dinamo București	3–0	Hamburger SV
Augustin 29'; Mulţescu 62'; Orac 79'

Stadionul 23 August, Bucharest
Attendance: 70,000
Referee: Jan Kieser (Netherlands)

2 November 1983
20:00

Hamburger SV	3–2	Dinamo București
Jakobs 45', 56' von Heesen 63'		Ţălnar 86'; Mulţescu 89'

Volksparkstadion, Hamburg
Attendance: 55,000
Referee: Kjell Johansson (Sweden)

Dinamo București won 5-3 on aggregate

Quarterfinals

7 March 1984
19:00

FC Dinamo Minsk	1–1	Dinamo București
Gurinovich 7'		Rednic 87'

V.I.Lenin Stadium, Minsk
Attendance: 14,000
Referee: Augusto Lamo Castillo (Spain)

21 March 1984
15:30

Dinamo București	1–0	FC Dinamo Minsk
Augustin 10'

Stadionul 23 August, Bucharest
Attendance: 70,000
Referee: Keith Hackett (England)

Dinamo București won 2-1 on aggregate

Semifinals

11 April 1984
19:30

Liverpool F.C.	1–0	Dinamo București
Lee 26'

Anfield, Liverpool
Attendance: 36,941
Referee: André Daina (Switzerland)

25 April 1984
17:00

Dinamo București	1–2	Liverpool F.C.
Orac 39'		Rush 11', 85'

Stadionul 23 August, Bucharest
Attendance: 70,000
Referee: Dieter Pauli (West Germany)

Liverpool F.C. won 3-1 on aggregate

== Squad ==
Goalkeepers: Dumitru Moraru (31 / 0); Constantin Eftimescu (4 / 0); Ovidiu Barba (1 / 0).
Defenders: Mircea Rednic (31 / 0); Marin Ion (28 / 0); Alexandru Nicolae (30 / 0); Ioan Andone (24 / 1); Nelu Stănescu (26 / 2); Ioan Mărginean (19 / 1); Liviu Baicea (1 / 0).
Midfielders: Gheorghe Mulțescu (23 / 8); Ionel Augustin (31 / 17); Marin Dragnea (29 / 15); Alexandru Custov (28 / 2); Lică Movilă (19 / 1); Viorel Radu (9 / 1); Grațian Moldovan (8 / 0).
Forwards: Cornel Țălnar (30 / 1); Iulius Nemțeanu (7 / 5); Gheorghe Iamandi (19 / 5); Costel Orac (23 / 5); Răzvan Dima (2 / 1); Viorel Turcu (11 / 2).
(league appearances and goals listed in brackets)

Manager: Nicolae Dumitru.

== Transfers ==
Before the season, Dinamo brought defenders Mircea Rednic and Ioan Andone from Corvinul Hunedoara, giving in return Florea Văetuș, Nicușor Vlad, Teofil Stredie and Laurențiu Moldovan. Dudu Georgescu is transferred to SC Bacău.
