= 1986 Cupa României final =

- Event: 1985–86 Cupa României
Dinamo București	Steaua București
1	0
- Date: 25 June 1986
- Venue: 23 August, Bucharest
- Referee: Radu Petrescu (Brașov)
- Attendance: 40,000

The 1986 Cupa României final was the 48th final of Romania's most prestigious football cup competition. It was disputed between Dinamo București and Steaua București, and was won by Dinamo București after a game with one goal. It was the sixth cup for Dinamo București.

== Route to the final ==
Dinamo București

Round of 32	CS Târgovişte	0–2	Dinamo București
Round of 16	Dinamo București	3–1	Universitatea Cluj
Quarter-finals	Dinamo București	2–2 (a.e.t.)(4–2 p)	Universitatea Craiova
Semi-finals	Victoria București	2–4	Dinamo București

Steaua București

Round of 32	Minerul Băiuț	1–8	Steaua București
Round of 16	Steaua București	4–2	Rapid București
Quarter-finals	Steaua București	5–1	Progresul Vulcan București
Semi-finals	Jiul Petroşani	1–2	Steaua București

== Match details ==
25 June 1986
18:00 EET

Dinamo București	1–0	Steaua București
Damaschin 71'	Report

23 August, Bucharest
Attendance: 40,000
Referee: Radu Petrescu (Brașov)

GK	1.	(Romania) Dumitru Moraru
DF	3.	(Romania) Alexandru Nicolae
DF	5.	(Romania) Mircea Rednic
DF	6.	(Romania) Ioan Andone
DF	4.	(Romania) Nelu Stănescu
MF	2.	(Romania) Ioan Varga
MF	8.	(Romania) Marin Dragnea
MF	10.	(Romania) Lică Movilă
MF	7.	(Romania) Alexandru Suciu	(substituted off) 46'
FW	9.	(Romania) Marian Damaschin
FW	11.	(Romania) Costel Orac
Substitutes:
DF		(Romania) Iulian Mihăescu	(substituted in) 46'	(substituted off) 89'
MF		(Romania) Nistor Văidean	(substituted in) 89'
Manager:
(Romania) Mircea Lucescu

GK	1.	(Romania) Helmut Duckadam
DF	2.	(Romania) Ștefan Iovan
DF	4.	(Romania) Adrian Bumbescu
DF	6.	(Romania) Miodrag Belodedici
DF	3.	(Romania) Ilie Bărbulescu
MF	10.	(Romania) Gavril Balint
MF	5.	(Romania) Tudorel Stoica
MF	11.	(Romania) László Bölöni
MF	8.	(Romania) Mihail Majearu	(substituted off) 75'
FW	7.	(Romania) Marius Lăcătuș
FW	9.	(Romania) Victor Pițurcă
Substitutes:
MF		(Romania) Lucian Bălan	(substituted in) 75'
Manager:
(Romania) Emerich Jenei

== See also ==
- List of Cupa României finals
- Eternal derby (Romania)
