= Gratian (disambiguation) =

Gratian (359–383) was Roman emperor from 367 to 383.

Gratian or Gratianus may also refer to:

- Felinus and Gratian (died 250), Christian martyrs and saints
- Gatianus of Tours, first bishop of Tours in the late 3rd century, also called Gratian
- Gratianus Funarius, 4th-century Roman soldier, father of emperors Valentinian I and Valens, grandfather of Emperor Gratian
- Gratian (usurper) (died c. 407), Romano-British usurper and emperor in 406–407
- Pope Gregory VI (John Gratian, died 1047), Italian pope from 1045 to 1046
- Gratian, Italian monk, bishop of Chiusi and father of canon law who wrote the 12th-century Decretum Gratiani
- Gracianus Municeps, legendary king of the Britons

== See also ==
- Jerome Gratian (1545–1614), Spanish Discalced Carmelite friar
- Gratian Anda (born 1969), Swiss businessman
- Gratian Goldstein, American bridge player
- Grațian Moldovan (born 1962), Romanian footballer
- Gratian Mundadan (born 1933), Indian Syro-Malabar Catholic bishop
- Grațian Sepi (1910–1977), Romanian footballer
- Gratian Silva (1933–2015), Sri Lankan general
