= CSM Făgăraș (football) =

Romanian football club

- Full name: Clubul Sportiv Municipal Făgăraș
- Nickname: Chimiștii (The Chemists)
- Short name: Făgăraș
- Founded: 1922; 104 years ago as Explosivi Făgăraș; 2009; 17 years ago as CSM Făgăraș; 2018; 8 years ago as CSM Făgăraș
- Ground: Park Arena
- Capacity: 4,510
- Chairman: Daniel Gușeilă
- Manager: George Greavu
- League: Liga IV
- 2025–26: Liga IV, Brașov County, 4th of 14
- Website: http://csmfagaras.ro/
| Home colours | Away colours |

Clubul Sportiv Municipal Făgăraș (Romanian pronunciation: [fəɡəˈraʃ]), commonly known as CSM Făgăraș or simply as Făgăraș, is a football team from Făgăraș, Brașov County, Romania, founded in 1922.

CSM Făgăraș spent most of its existence between the second and third tier and its fall, reported in recent years, was determined by the collapse of the Făgăraș Chemical Compound, the main sponsor of the team.

== History ==
=== First years and the period of glory ===
CSM Făgăraș was founded in 1922 and its first participation in the national leagues was recorded in the 1946–47 Divizia C season, under the name of Explosivi Făgăraș, finishing 5th. Next season the football club from Făgăraș was promoted to Divizia B, but they finished 11th, thus relegating. Explosivi continued one more season at the level of Divizia C, then the competition being dissolved and the team enrolled in the Regional Championship.

In 1958 the team of the Făgăraș Chemical Compound appeared again in the re-founded Divizia C, under the name of Chimia Făgăraș, winning the 4th series and promoting back to Divizia B. Followed six consecutive seasons in the second tier, with the best performance being a 4th place at the end of the 1962–63 season. Chimia finished last at the end of the 1964–65 season and relegated back to the third tier. After four less successful seasons, Chimia won the 8th series at the end of the 1968–69 season, but finished only 3rd in the promotion play-off group, after Olimpia Satu Mare and Minerul Anina, missing the promotion. Followed another 2nd place, then Chimia won again its series, finishing again 3rd in the promotion play-off group, but was promoted in front of the second place, Arieșul Turda.

Chimia barely escaped from relegation in its first season of Divizia B, after the promotion, then in the summer of 1972 changed its name in Nitramonia Făgăraș. In 1974 Nitramonia relegated again, but promoted back after only one season. In the 1970s the Făgăraș Chemical Compound was in its period of glory, so the team remained for a period at the level of the second tier, but without important results. The chemists relegated at the end of the 1980–81 Divizia B season, but promoted again after two years of absence. 1983–84 Divizia B season was the last for Nitramonia in the second league for the next 14 years, the chemists finished 15th and relegated to Divizia C, when the club spent most of the time.

=== The fall of the chemical industry and football ===
The team was financially supported by the Făgăraș Chemical Compound until 1989 and by SC Nitramonia SA (the name of the compound after privatization) until 1999. During this period, the team played in the third league, except the 1997–98 season when they promoted in the second league (President: Alexandru Gherghe, Manager: Nistor Văidean). The lack of financial support led the team to the relegation. The club continued to play in the Liga III until the 2004–05 season, season in which under the name of ENA Făgăraș the club relegated to Liga IV.

At the beginning of the 2008–09 season, the club bought Inter Pantelimon place in Liga III and was renamed Ena Inter Făgăraș, ranking 14th at the end of the season, managing to avoid relegation. After only one year, the sponsors gave up funding for the team and the Municipality of Făgăraș (the owner of the stadium) decided to enroll the team only in the Liga IV.

| Name | Period |
| Explosivi Făgăraș | 1922–1950 |
| Metalul Făgăraș | 1950–1958 |
| Chimia Făgăraș | 1958–1972 |
| Nitramonia Făgăraș | 1972–2004 |
| ENA Făgăraș | 2004–2008 |
| ENA Inter Făgăraș | 2008–2009 |
| CSM Făgăraș | 2009–2012 |
| Civitas Făgăraș | 2012–2013 |
| CSM Făgăraș | 2013–present |

In 2009 the club was re-founded again as CSM Făgăraș, then in 2012 changed its name in Civitas Făgăraș and promoted to Liga III, but due to financial problems the club was not able to end the season and withdrew, being dissolved again.

In 2018 the football section of CSM Făgăraș was reactivated, being active mainly in the youth sector, but also having a senior team enrolled in the Liga V.

== Honours ==
=== Leagues ===
Liga III

- Winners (6): 1958–59, 1968–69, 1970–71, 1974–75, 1982–83, 1996–97
- Runners-up (3): 1969–70, 1984–85, 1985–86

Liga IV – Brașov County

- Winners (1): 2011–12
- Runners-up (2): 2009–10, 2010–11

==== Cups ====
Cupa României – Brașov County

- Winners (1): 2011–12

=== Other performances ===
- Appearances in Liga II: 18
- Best finish in Liga II: 4th place in the 1962–63 season.

== Former managers ==
- (Romania) Andrei Sepci (1946–1947)
- (Romania) Iosif Lengheriu (1959–1963)
- (Romania) Gheorghe Dungu (1964–1965)
- (Romania) Nistor Văidean (1997)
- (Romania) Vasile Chiric (1997)
- (Romania) Nistor Văidean (1997–1998)
- (Romania) Vasile Chiric (1998–2000)
