= Nistor Văidean =

Romanian footballer

Personal information
- Date of birth: 1 October 1961 (age 65)
- Place of birth: Făgăraș, Romania
- Position: Central midfielder

Senior career*
Years	Team	Apps	(Gls)
1983–1985	FCM Brașov	69	(20)
1985–1987	Dinamo București	41	(9)
1987–1989	Flacăra Moreni	76	(20)
1990	FCM Brașov	13	(2)
1990–1992	Győri ETO	24	(1)
1992–1993	FCM Brașov	19	(1)
Total		242	(53)

International career
1985	Romania B	1	(1)
1985	Romania U21	5	(3)
1986–1988	Romania Olympic	6	(1)
1986	Romania	2	(0)

Managerial career
- 1997: Nitramonia Făgăraș
- 1997–1998: Nitramonia Făgăraș
- * Club domestic league appearances and goals

Nistor Văidean (born 1 October 1961) is a Romanian former football midfielder.

== Club career ==
Văidean was born on 1 October 1961 in Făgăraș, Romania. He began playing senior-level football at FCM Brașov, making his Divizia A debut on 5 March 1983 under coach Ștefan Coidum in a 3–1 away loss to Dinamo București. The team suffered relegation at the end of the 1982–83 season, but Văidean stayed with the club, helping it gain promotion back to the first league after one year by scoring 11 goals. In 1985, Văidean went to play for Dinamo. There, he played in both legs of the 2–2 aggregate loss on the away goals rule to Vardar in the first round of the 1985–86 UEFA Cup. Dinamo reached the 1986 Cupa României final, where coach Mircea Lucescu sent him in the 89th minute to replace Iulian Mihăescu in the 1–0 victory against Steaua București, which had recently won the European Cup.

In 1987, Văidean joined Flacăra Moreni where he scored a career-best 13 goals during the 1988–89 season to help the club finish in fourth place. Subsequently, he played in both legs of the 4–1 aggregate loss to Porto in the first round of the 1989–90 UEFA Cup. In the middle of the 1989–90 season, he left Flacăra and went for a second spell at FCM Brașov. In 1990, Văidean moved to Hungarian club Győri ETO. Văidean made his Nemzeti Bajnokság I debut on 18 August under coach Karol Pecze in a 2–1 away loss to Siófoki Bányász in which he received a red card. On 13 April 1991, he scored his first goal in the competition in a 1–1 draw against Videoton. In 1992, Văidean went for a third spell at FCM Brașov. He made his last Divizia A appearance on 17 April 1993 in Brașov's 0–0 draw against Sportul Studențesc București, totaling 196 matches with 41 goals in the competition.

== International career ==
From 1985 to 1988, Văidean was consistently featured for Romania's under-21, B and Olympic sides.

Văidean earned two caps for Romania, making his debut on 14 March 1986, when coach Mircea Lucescu sent him on at halftime to replace Ion Geolgău in a 1–1 friendly draw against Iraq. Three days later, he played as a starter in another friendly against Iraq and was in turn substituted by Geolgău, with the game ending in a goalless draw.

== Managerial career ==
Văidean coached Nitramonia Făgăraș across several stints, notably helping the club achieve promotion to Divizia B at the end of the 1996–97 season.

== Writing ==
Văidean wrote a book titled Bucuria unui copil despre care se credea că nu va mai juca fotbal niciodată (The joy of a child who was thought never to play football again) which was released in 2010.

== Honours ==
=== Player ===
FCM Brașov

- Divizia B: 1983–84

Dinamo București

- Cupa României: 1985–86

=== Manager ===
Nitramonia Făgăraș

- Divizia C: 1996–97
