= Alexandru Suciu =

Romanian footballer

Personal information
- Date of birth: 29 October 1960 (age 66)
- Place of birth: Cluj, Romania
- Position: Midfielder

Youth career
- Universitatea Cluj

Senior career*
Years	Team	Apps	(Gls)
1977–1984	Universitatea Cluj	142	(34)
1984–1987	Dinamo București		
1989–1990	Universitatea Cluj	28	(3)
1992	Siófok	1	(0)
Total		171	(37)

International career
1979–1984	Romania U21	13	(2)
1985	Romania B	1	(0)
1985	Romania	1	(0)
- * Club domestic league appearances and goals

Alexandru Suciu (born 29 October 1960) is a Romanian former international footballer who played as a midfielder.

== International career ==
Suciu played one friendly game for Romania in 1985 when coach Mircea Lucescu send him on the field in the 46th minute to replace Dorin Mateuț in a match against Poland which ended 0–0.

== Honours ==
Universitatea Cluj

- Divizia B: 1984–85

Dinamo București

- Cupa României: 1985–86
