= Iulian Mihăescu =

Romanian footballer (born 1962)

Personal information
- Date of birth: 11 September 1962 (age 64)
- Place of birth: Viișoara, Romania
- Height: 1.83 m (6 ft 0 in)
- Positions: Central midfielder; defender

Senior career*
Years	Team	Apps	(Gls)
1984–1985	Flacăra Moreni		
1986–1992	Dinamo București	178	(39)
1992–1993	Petrolul Ploiești	10	(0)
1993–1994	Sportul Studențesc	17	(0)
Total		205	(39)

International career
1986	Romania U21	1	(0)

Managerial career
- 2002: Poiana Câmpina
- 2003–2005: Dinamo București (assistant)
- 2005–2006: Omonia Nicosia (assistant)
- 2006: Unirea Urziceni (caretaker)
- 2007–2008: CFR Cluj (assistant)
- 2008–2009: Al-Ettifaq (assistant)
- 2009: Al-Ahli (assistant)
- 2010: CSKA Sofia (assistant)
- 2010–2011: Dinamo București (assistant)
- 2012: CFR Cluj (assistant)
- 2013: CS Turnu Severin (assistant)
- 2013: Dinamo II București (assistant)
- 2013: Dinamo II București (caretaker)
- 2013: Astana (assistant)
- 2014: Al-Ettifaq (assistant)
- 2015–2017: Dinamo București (assistant)
- 2018–2020: Dinamo București (assistant)
- 2020–2022: Dinamo București (assistant)
- 2023–2024: Dinamo București (assistant)
- * Club domestic league appearances and goals

Iulian Mihăescu (born 11 September 1962) is a Romanian footballer who played as a midfielder and defender.

== Club career ==
Mihăescu was born on 11 September 1962 in Târgoviște, Romania. He began his senior football career in 1984 by playing as a forward at Divizia B club Flacăra Moreni.

In 1985, Mihăescu was transferred to Dinamo București, where he played mainly in the defense, making his Divizia A debut on 8 March 1986 when coach Mircea Lucescu sent him at half-time to replace Alexandru Nicolae in a 3–1 victory against FCM Bacău. On 28 May he scored his first goal in the league, the decisive one in the 2–1 win over rivals Steaua București. Afterwards, on 25 June in the Cupa României final, Lucescu sent him at half time to replace Nelu Stănescu, playing until the 89th minute when he got replaced by Nistor Văidean in the 1–0 victory against the same team. At the time of these two events, The Military Men were the recent winners of the European Cup. During his years spent with The Red Dogs, Mihăescu won two league titles in the 1989–90 and 1991–92 seasons. In the first one, coach Lucescu used him in 27 games in which he scored seven goals and in the second he played 27 games and scored once under coach Florin Halagian as the team won the title undefeated. He also won the 1989–90 Cupa României but did not play in the final. Mihăescu made 22 appearances with one goal scored in European competitions. He helped the team reach the quarter-finals in the 1988–89 European Cup Winners' Cup where they were eliminated on the away goals rule after 1–1 on aggregate by Sampdoria. In the following edition of the same competition, Mihăescu played seven games and scored once against Dinamo Tirana, as Dinamo reached the semi-finals where they were defeated with 2–0 on aggregate by Anderlecht.

After six and a half seasons spent at Dinamo, Mihăescu went to play for the last two seasons of his career at Petrolul Ploiești and Sportul Studențesc. His last Divizia A appearance took place on 24 April 1994 in Sportul's 3–1 loss to Steaua, totaling 205 appearances with 39 goals in the competition.

== International career ==
Mihăescu played one game for Romania's under-21 national team in a 1–0 victory against Austria U21 which took place on 9 September 1986. As he never played for Romania's senior team, on 13 May 2020, Gazeta Sporturilor included Mihăescu on a list of best Romanian players who never played for the senior national team.

== Coaching career ==
After ending his playing career, Mihăescu worked mostly as an assistant, with only short periods as head coach, most notably at Unirea Urziceni in Liga I.

== Honours ==
Flacăra Moreni

- Divizia B: 1985–86

Dinamo București

- Divizia A: 1989–90, 1991–92
- Cupa României: 1985–86, 1989–90
