= Gabriel Răduță =

Romanian footballer

Personal information
- Full name: Gabriel Marian Răduță
- Date of birth: 15 September 1965 (age 61)
- Place of birth: Bucharest, Romania
- Position: Midfielder

Team information
- Current team: Dinamo București (head of youth development)

Senior career*
| Years | Team | Apps | (Gls) |
| 1987–1993 | Sportul Studențesc București (Note: The statistics for the 1988–89 Divizia A season are unavailable.) | 103 | (30) |
| 1993–1997 | Dinamo București | 23 | (2) |
| 1994–1995 | → FC Brașov (loan) | 6 | (0) |
| 1995–1997 | → FC Brașov (loan) | 17 | (0) |
| 1997–2000 | Wuppertaler SV | 56 | (5) |
| Total | | 205 | (37) |

International career
| 1991–1992 | Romania | 3 | (0) |

Managerial career
- 2010–2012: Progresul Cernica
- 2013: Progresul Cernica
- * Club domestic league appearances and goals

Gabriel Marian Răduță (born 15 September 1965) is a Romanian former footballer who played as a midfielder. After he ended his playing career, he worked for a while as a manager in the Romanian lower leagues. Later he worked at Dinamo București's youth center where he taught and formed generations of players, which include Ionuț Nedelcearu, Dorin Rotariu, Valentin Costache, Denis Ciobotariu, Ion Gheorghe, Mihai Neicuțescu, Robert Moldoveanu, Constantin Dima and Andrei Tîrcoveanu.

== International career ==
Răduță played three friendly games at international level for Romania, making his debut when he came as a substitute and replaced Florin Constantinovici in the 59th minute of a 3–1 loss against Egypt.

== Honours ==
Wuppertal

- Oberliga Nordrhein: 1999–2000
