= Benone Dohot =

Romanian footballer

Personal information
- Date of birth: 23 April 1963 (age 63)
- Place of birth: Iași, Romania
- Height: 1.86 m (6 ft 1 in)
- Position: Goalkeeper

Youth career
- 1973–1980: Politehnica Iași

Senior career*
Years	Team	Apps	(Gls)
1980–1986	Politehnica Iași (Note: The statistics for the 1981–82, 1985–86 and 1986–87 Divizia B seasons are unavailable.)	15	(0)
1987	Dinamo București	6	(0)
1987–1990	Flacăra Moreni	40	(0)
1990–1992	Politehnica Iași		
1992–1994	Diósgyőri	39	(0)
1994–1995	Ceahlăul Piatra Neamț	17	(0)
1995–1996	Foresta Fălticeni	30	(0)
1997–1999	Politehnica Iași	23	(0)
Total		170	(0)
- * Club domestic league appearances and goals

Benone Dohot (born 23 April 1963) is a Romanian former football goalkeeper. After he ended his playing career, Dohot worked as a goalkeeper coach.

== Honours ==
Politehnica Iași

- Divizia B: 1981–82

Foresta Fălticeni

- Divizia B: 1996–97
