= Cătălin Necula =

Romanian footballer and manager

Personal information
- Full name: Cătălin Răducan Necula
- Date of birth: 4 December 1969 (age 56)
- Place of birth: Bucharest, Romania
- Height: 1.81 m (5 ft 11 in)
- Position: Defender

Youth career
- –1989: Sportul Studențesc

Senior career*
Years	Team	Apps	(Gls)
1989–1993	Sportul Studențesc	77	(1)
1989–1990	→ Sportul 30 Decembrie (loan)		
1993–1995	Universitatea Cluj	66	(1)
1995–1998	Național București	91	(2)
1998–1999	Hapoel Kfar Saba	22	(0)
1999–2000	CSM Reșița	24	(0)
2000–2001	Rocar București	10	(0)
2001	Bihor Oradea	10	(1)
2002–2003	Argeș Pitești	25	(0)
2003–2004	Gloria Bistrița	24	(0)
Total		346	(5)

International career
1993	Romania	4	(0)

Managerial career
- 2004–2005: Național București (assistant)
- 2005: Național București (caretaker)
- 2005: Politehnica Timişoara (assistant)
- 2005–2007: Steaua București (assistant)
- 2007–2009: Al Hilal (assistant)
- 2009: Al Hilal (caretaker)
- 2009–2010: Al Sadd (assistant)
- 2011: Steaua București (assistant)
- 2011–2013: Al Ain (assistant)
- 2013–2017: Al Ahli (assistant)
- 2018–2021: Jiangsu Suning (assistant)
- 2021–2025: Sharjah (assistant)
- 2025–2026: United Arab Emirates (assistant)
- * Club domestic league appearances and goals

Cătălin Răducan Necula (born 4 December 1969) is a Romanian football coach and former player.

== Playing career ==
Necula, son of the famous Romanian goalkeeper Răducanu Necula, started his career at Sportul Studențesc București in 1988. He spent four seasons at Sportul before switching to Universitatea Cluj in 1993.

In 1995, he joined Naţional București and then in 1998 he played for a short while for Hapoel Kfar Saba in Israel. After he returned to Romania, he continued to play for FCM Reşiţa, Rocar București, Bihor Oradea, Argeş Piteşti and Gloria Bistriţa, before retiring from professional football in 2004.

== Coaching career ==
In 2004, Necula returned to Naţional București, this time as assistant coach and then in the autumn of 2005 he was for a short while the team's head coach. When Cosmin Olăroiu took over at Steaua București in the winter of 2005 he asked Necula to join him as assistant manager. Since then, he joined the coaching staff of Cosmin Olăroiu.

== Playing statistics ==
Romania
Year	Apps	Goals
1993	4	0
Total	4	0

== Honours ==
=== Player ===
Național București

- Cupa României runner-up: 2002–03

Rocar București

- Cupa României runner-up: 2000–01
