= Ionel Fulga =

Romanian footballer

Personal information
- Date of birth: 17 February 1971 (age 55)
- Place of birth: Basarab, Romania
- Height: 1.75 m (5 ft 9 in)
- Position: Midfielder

Senior career*
Years	Team	Apps	(Gls)
1986–1987	Pajura București		
1988–1989	Victoria București	31	(1)
1990–1991	Dinamo București	26	(3)
1991–1992	Inter Sibiu	14	(0)
1992–1994	Steaua București	30	(2)
1994	Rocar București	1	(0)
1995–1996	Dinamo București	28	(1)
1996	FC Brașov	19	(1)
1997	Rapid București	1	(0)
1997	Argeș Pitești	2	(0)
1998	Chindia Târgoviște	4	(0)
1998–1999	Astra Ploiești	16	(0)
2000	Fulgerul Bragadiru		
Total		172	(8)

International career
1989–1990	Romania U21	10	(1)
1989–1990	Romania Olympic	3	(2)
- * Club domestic league appearances and goals

Ionel Fulga (born 17 February 1971) is a Romanian former footballer who played as a midfielder.

== Honours ==
Dinamo București

- Divizia A: 1989–90

Steaua București

- Divizia A: 1992–93, 1993–94

Fulgerul Bragadiru

- Divizia C: 1999–2000
