= Gheorghe Tulba =

Romanian footballer

Personal information
- Date of birth: 19 November 1960 (age 65)
- Place of birth: Moftinul Mare, Romania
- Position: Forward

Senior career*
Years	Team	Apps	(Gls)
1977–1978	FC Baia Mare	2	(0)
1979–1982	Minerul Cavnic	86	(25)
1982–1984	Maramureș Baia Mare	65	(30)
1984–1985	Dinamo București	30	(0)
1986–1988	Maramureș Baia Mare	80	(40)
1989	Olt Scornicești	22	(2)
1990–1993	Debrecen	67	(8)
Total		352	(105)
- * Club domestic league appearances and goals

Gheorghe Tulba (born 19 November 1960) is a Romanian former footballer who played as a forward.

== Honours ==
Maramureș Baia Mare

- Divizia B: 1977–78, 1982–83

Debrecen

- Nemzeti Bajnokság II: 1992–93
