= 1983–84 Divizia A =

66th season of top-tier football league in Romania

Divizia A
- Season: 1983–84
- Champions: Dinamo București
- Matches: 306
- Goals: 758 (2.48 per match)
- Top goalscorer: Marcel Coraș (18)

The 1983–84 Divizia A was the sixty-sixth season of Divizia A, the top-level football league of Romania.

== Teams ==
Location of teams in 1983-84 Divizia A

== League table ==
Pos	Team	Pld	W	D	L	GF	GA	GD	Pts	Qualification or relegation
1	Dinamo București (C)	34	19	11	4	69	36	+33	49	Qualification to European Cup first round
2	Steaua București	34	21	5	8	59	23	+36	47	Qualification to Cup Winners' Cup first round
3	Universitatea Craiova	34	18	7	9	57	27	+30	43	Qualification to UEFA Cup first round
4	Sportul Studenţesc București	34	17	6	11	57	43	+14	40	Qualification to UEFA Cup first round
5	Argeș Pitești	34	17	4	13	42	33	+9	38	Invitation to Balkans Cup
6	SC Bacău	34	15	5	14	36	47	−11	35	Invitation to Balkans Cup
7	Bihor Oradea	34	14	6	14	50	46	+4	34	
8	Politehnica Iași	34	12	10	12	32	36	−4	34	
9	Chimia Râmnicu Vâlcea	34	14	6	14	40	50	−10	34	
10	Olt Scornicești	34	11	11	12	38	27	+11	33	
11	Jiul Petroșani	34	13	7	14	34	47	−13	33	
12	Corvinul Hunedoara	34	12	8	14	46	44	+2	32	
13	Rapid București	34	10	11	13	30	34	−4	31	
14	ASA Târgu Mureș	34	12	6	16	36	46	−10	30	
15	FC Baia Mare	34	12	6	16	40	59	−19	30	
16	Dunărea Galați (R)	34	9	10	15	32	41	−9	28	Relegation to Divizia B
17	Petrolul Ploiești (R)	34	9	7	18	33	49	−16	25	Relegation to Divizia B
18	CS Târgoviște (R)	34	5	6	23	27	70	−43	16	Relegation to Divizia B

Source: LT
Rules for classification: 1) points; 2) goal difference; 3) number of goals scored
(C) Champions; (R) Relegated

=== Results ===
Home \ Away	ASA	ARG	BAC	BAI	BHO	COR	UCR	DIN	DUN	JIU	OLT	PET	PIA	RAP	RAM	SPO	STE	TAR
ASA Târgu Mureș	—	3–1	3–1	2–0	4–1	2–1	0–0	1–1	2–0	3–0	2–1	2–1	2–0	1–0	1–1	0–1	0–0	2–1
Argeș Pitești	1–0	—	4–0	3–0	3–1	2–0	2–1	1–1	2–1	2–0	1–0	3–1	3–0	1–1	3–1	0–0	0–2	1–0
Bacău	1–0	0–1	—	2–0	1–0	1–1	1–0	1–1	2–1	2–0	2–1	0–1	1–1	2–0	2–1	2–0	3–0	2–1
Baia Mare	2–0	0–2	4–0	—	0–0	2–1	1–0	2–2	2–4	4–1	1–1	1–1	4–0	3–0	3–1	2–1	1–0	1–0
Bihor Oradea	4–0	3–0	1–0	4–0	—	1–1	1–1	4–1	2–0	4–1	1–1	4–2	2–1	0–0	4–1	1–4	1–0	3–0
Corvinul Hunedoara	1–0	3–1	2–0	4–1	1–0	—	1–2	2–2	2–2	0–2	2–0	2–0	2–0	2–0	0–0	0–0	1–2	3–1
Universitatea Craiova	2–0	3–0	4–1	4–0	4–2	1–0	—	3–0	2–2	0–0	1–0	3–0	1–2	1–0	6–1	4–1	2–1	4–0
Dinamo București	3–0	1–0	4–1	4–1	3–1	4–2	2–1	—	3–1	6–2	3–1	4–0	4–1	1–0	2–0	3–1	0–3	3–0
Dunărea Galați	1–0	1–0	0–1	0–0	0–2	3–1	0–1	0–0	—	2–0	0–0	2–0	0–0	0–0	3–1	0–0	3–1	3–1
Jiul Petroșani	1–0	2–0	2–0	1–0	3–0	2–2	1–1	1–1	2–1	—	2–0	2–0	2–0	0–0	1–0	3–2	0–0	2–1
Olt Scornicești	4–0	1–0	2–0	3–0	4–1	0–0	0–1	1–0	1–1	5–0	—	1–1	2–0	1–1	0–0	2–0	0–1	2–0
Petrolul Ploiești	2–0	0–1	0–1	1–1	2–0	2–4	1–0	0–0	0–0	2–0	1–1	—	1–1	3–1	2–0	0–2	0–1	6–1
Politehnica Iași	2–1	2–1	0–1	1–0	0–0	3–0	0–0	0–0	3–1	4–0	0–0	2–0	—	2–0	2–0	1–0	0–2	2–0
Rapid București	1–1	0–2	2–0	2–1	0–1	2–1	0–0	1–2	2–0	1–0	1–1	1–0	0–0	—	4–2	0–1	1–1	3–0
Chimia Râmnicu Vâlcea	2–1	1–0	3–2	1–0	1–0	2–1	0–2	1–1	1–0	1–0	1–0	3–1	2–0	0–0	—	4–2	1–0	3–0
Sportul Studențesc București	3–2	2–1	1–1	6–2	3–1	1–0	3–0	0–3	3–0	0–0	2–1	1–2	1–1	1–2	3–2	—	2–1	3–1
Steaua București	5–0	2–0	4–0	7–0	1–0	1–0	2–1	1–1	3–0	1–0	1–0	3–0	3–1	2–1	3–1	0–2	—	4–0
Târgoviște	1–1	0–0	2–2	0–1	3–0	2–3	2–1	2–3	1–0	2–1	0–1	1–0	0–0	1–3	1–1	1–5	1–1	—

Source: LT (in Romanian)
Legend: Blue = home team win; Yellow = draw; Red = away team win.

== Top goalscorers ==
Position	Player	Club	Goals
1	Marcel Coraș	Sportul Studenţesc	18
2	Ionel Augustin	Dinamo București	17
2	Rodion Cămătaru	Universitatea Craiova	17
4	Marin Dragnea	Dinamo București	15
5	Gheorghe Tulba	FC Baia Mare	14

== Champion squad ==
Dinamo București

Goalkeepers: Dumitru Moraru (31 / 0); Constantin Eftimescu (4 / 0); Ovidiu Barba (1 / 0).
Defenders: Mircea Rednic (31 / 0); Marin Ion (28 / 0); Alexandru Nicolae (30 / 0); Ioan Andone (24 / 1); Nelu Stănescu (26 / 2); Ioan Mărginean (19 / 1); Liviu Baicea (1 / 0).
Midfielders: Gheorghe Mulțescu (23 / 8); Ionel Augustin (31 / 17); Marin Dragnea (29 / 15); Alexandru Custov (28 / 2); Lică Movilă (19 / 1); Viorel Radu (9 / 1); Grațian Moldovan (8 / 0).
Forwards: Cornel Țălnar (30 / 1); Iulius Nemțeanu (7 / 5); Gheorghe Iamandi (19 / 5); Costel Orac (23 / 5); Răzvan Dima (2 / 1); Viorel Turcu (11 / 2).
(league appearances and goals listed in brackets)

Manager: Nicolae Dumitru.

== Attendances ==
No.	Club	Average
1	FC Rapid	20,706
2	Craiova	20,176
3	Steaua	20,000
4	Dinamo 1948	16,471
5	Petrolul	13,353
6	Dunărea	13,353
7	Baia Mare	12,059
8	Bihor	11,941
9	Sportul Studenţesc	10,841
10	Argeş	9,059
11	Bacău	8,941
12	Hunedoara	8,735
13	Iaşi	7,029
14	Tīrgu Mureş	6,941
15	Rāmnicu Vālcea	6,824
16	Tārgovişte	6,147
17	Jiul	4,941
18	Olt Scorniceşti	4,853

== See also ==
- 1983–84 Divizia B
- 1983–84 Divizia C
- 1983–84 County Championship
- 1983–84 Cupa României
