= 1989–90 Divizia A =

72nd season of top-tier football league in Romania

Divizia A
- Season: 1989–90
- Champions: Dinamo București
- Matches: 305
- Goals: 890 (2.92 per match)
- Top goalscorer: Gavril Balint (19)
- Biggest home win: Bihor 6–0 Brașov; Dinamo 7–1 Bacău; Petrolul 6–0 Corvinul; Steaua 6–0 U Cluj
- Biggest away win: Sportul 0–5 Steaua
- Highest scoring: Steaua 6–4 Bihor
- Longest winning run: Dinamo, Steaua (10)
- Longest unbeaten run: Dinamo (11)
- Longest winless run: Scornicești, Victoria (18)
- Longest losing run: Scornicești (18)

The 1989–90 Divizia A was the seventy-second season of Divizia A, the top-level football league of Romania.

== Teams ==
Location of teams in 1989-90 Divizia A

== League table ==
Pos	Team	Pld	W	D	L	GF	GA	GD	Pts	Qualification or relegation
1	Dinamo București (C)	34	26	5	3	96	23	+73	57	Qualification to European Cup first round
2	Steaua București	34	26	4	4	89	30	+59	56	Qualification to Cup Winners' Cup first round
3	Universitatea Craiova	34	19	6	9	56	27	+29	44	Qualification to UEFA Cup first round
4	Petrolul Ploiești	34	17	7	10	56	40	+16	41	Qualification to UEFA Cup first round Invitation to Intertoto Cup
5	Politehnica Timișoara	34	17	7	10	65	40	+25	41	Qualification to UEFA Cup first round
6	Inter Sibiu	34	16	4	14	52	42	+10	36	Invitation to Balkans Cup
7	FCM Brașov	34	13	9	12	42	57	−15	35	
8	Corvinul Hunedoara	34	14	4	16	37	56	−19	32	
9	Farul Constanța	34	11	9	14	54	54	0	31	
10	Bihor Oradea	34	13	4	17	61	61	0	30	
11	Sportul Studenţesc București	34	12	6	16	43	57	−14	30	Invitation to Intertoto Cup
12	Argeș Pitești	34	13	3	18	38	45	−7	29	
13	Universitatea Cluj	34	10	9	15	40	60	−20	29	
14	Jiul Petroșani	34	12	5	17	41	54	−13	29	
15	SC Bacău	34	12	5	17	43	56	−13	29	
16	Flacăra Moreni (R)	34	10	8	16	37	48	−11	28	Relegation to Divizia B
17	Victoria București (D)	33	8	5	20	24	64	−40	21	Team dissolved after Romanian Revolution
18	Olt Scornicești (D)	33	4	4	25	16	76	−60	12	Team dissolved after Romanian Revolution

Source: LT
Rules for classification: 1) points; 2) goal difference; 3) number of goals scored
(C) Champions; (D) Disqualified; (R) Relegated

=== Results ===
Home \ Away	ARG	BAC	BHO	BRA	COR	UCR	DIN	FAR	FLA	INT	JIU	OLT	PET	SPO	STE	POL	UCL	VIB
Argeș Pitești	—	1–0	2–1	4–0	1–0	1–0	0–2	1–0	2–0	1–0	3–0	3–0	1–0	1–2	0–1	3–3	1–0	0–1
Bacău	2–1	—	1–0	0–0	3–0	1–2	1–1	2–0	1–0	1–0	2–1	0–0	0–1	2–1	0–1	4–1	4–2	3–0
Bihor Oradea	2–1	5–3	—	6–0	4–0	2–2	0–2	3–2	2–0	1–0	5–1	3–0	1–2	4–1	1–2	1–0	0–0	3–0
Brașov	1–0	2–1	1–0	—	0–1	1–0	2–2	3–2	3–0	3–2	2–0	1–1	0–0	1–0	0–3	2–3	4–0	1–0
Corvinul Hunedoara	2–1	1–0	2–0	2–2	—	2–0	1–0	3–1	0–0	1–0	1–1	1–0	3–1	2–1	0–4	2–0	0–0	3–0
Universitatea Craiova	3–0	3–1	4–1	4–0	4–0	—	1–0	2–0	2–0	0–0	2–0	3–0	0–1	3–0	2–0	2–0	2–1	3–0
Dinamo București	2–0	7–1	6–1	4–0	3–0	5–3	—	4–1	2–1	6–1	3–0	4–0	3–0	3–2	2–2	5–0	6–1	3–0
Farul Constanța	3–1	2–2	4–1	2–2	2–0	1–1	0–3	—	4–1	2–0	2–0	3–0	3–2	2–1	0–1	1–1	4–0	3–0
Flacăra Moreni	0–0	2–0	2–2	4–1	3–1	0–1	1–2	2–1	—	1–0	1–0	2–0	0–0	0–1	0–2	0–2	1–1	3–0
Inter Sibiu	3–0	3–0	2–1	4–1	2–1	1–0	1–0	1–1	5–1	—	2–0	5–0	0–1	3–0	0–1	3–1	4–1	3–0
Jiul Petroșani	1–0	3–0	2–1	3–1	5–3	1–1	0–2	1–1	2–0	3–0	—	3–0	2–1	1–2	2–2	4–0	2–1	0–0
Olt Scornicești	2–1	0–3	2–1	0–3	0–3	1–1	0–3	1–1	0–3	0–3	2–0	—	4–3	0–3	0–1	0–3	0–1	1–2
Petrolul Ploiești	5–1	2–0	1–2	6–1	1–0	1–0	0–1	5–0	0–0	2–2	4–0	3–0	—	5–1	4–2	4–0	4–1	0–0
Sportul Studenţesc București	0–0	2–1	2–2	2–0	2–1	2–0	1–1	0–0	1–3	1–2	3–0	3–2	2–2	—	0–5	3–3	1–0	0–1
Steaua București	2–1	4–2	6–4	1–1	4–0	1–2	0–3	5–3	3–0	5–0	5–0	3–0	3–0	3–0	—	2–0	6–0	4–2
Politehnica Timișoara	3–0	3–0	3–0	0–0	6–0	2–1	1–1	1–0	2–2	1–0	1–0	1–0	1–1	2–0	0–1	—	3–0	3–0
Universitatea Cluj	4–3	3–0	2–1	0–0	3–1	1–1	0–1	3–2	2–2	0–0	1–0	3–0	2–4	2–0	1–1	1–2	—	0–0
Victoria București	0–3	2–2	3–0	0–3	2–0	0–1	1–4	1–1	3–2	5–0	0–3	N/A	0–3	0–3	0–3	1–0	0–3	—

Source: LT (in Romanian)
Legend: Blue = home team win; Yellow = draw; Red = away team win.

== Top goalscorers ==
Position	Player	Club	Goals
1	Gavril Balint	Steaua București	19
2	Marian Popa	Farul Constanţa	15
3	Marian Bâcu	Jiul Petroşani	14
3	Florin Răducioiu	Dinamo București	14
3	Claudiu Vaişcovici	Dinamo București	14

== Champion squad ==
Dinamo București

Goalkeepers: Bogdan Stelea (22 / 0); Costel Câmpeanu (10 / 0); Sorin Colceag (1 / 0).
Defenders: Alpár Mészáros (15 / 1); Ioan Andone (20 / 2); Mircea Rednic (19 / 1); Michael Klein (23 / 2); Iulian Mihăescu (24 / 7); Anton Doboș (21 / 1); Adrian Matei (10 / 0); Florin Jelea (1 / 0); Adrian Slave (1 / 0); Cornel Mirea (12 / 0); Alexandru Nicolae (5 / 0); Mihail Cristian Țicu (3 / 0); Claudiu Jijie (1 / 0).
Midfielders: Ioan Sabău (24 / 5); Dorin Mateuț (22 / 9); Ioan Lupescu (29 / 4); Cristian Lazăr (11 / 2); Ionel Fulga (7 / 3); Mihai Stoica (7 / 0); George Radu (5 / 0).
Forwards: Dănuț Lupu (22 / 6); Claudiu Vaișcovici (21 / 14); Cezar Zamfir (21 / 6); Florin Răducioiu (24 / 14); Daniel Timofte (20 / 8); Marian Damaschin (5 / 1); Mircea Lucescu (1 / 0); Marian Năstase (3 / 0); Nicu Glonț (1 / 0).
(league appearances and goals listed in brackets)

Manager: Mircea Lucescu.

== Attendances ==
No.	Club	Average
1	Craiova	23,267
2	Timișoara	16,500
3	Steaua	14,688
4	Sibiu	13,188
5	Farul	12,200
6	Petrolul	11,625
7	Bihor	10,233
8	Argeş	10,000
9	Bacău	8,438
10	Jiul	8,219
11	Dinamo 1948	8,031
12	U Cluj	7,625
13	Braşov	7,559
14	Hunedoara	4,813
15	Sportul Studenţesc	4,412
16	Flacara	3,531
17	Olt	4,000
18	Victoria Bucureşti	3,167

== See also ==
- 1989–90 Divizia B
