= Florin Prunea =

Romanian footballer

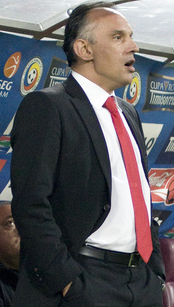
- Prunea as sporting director of Dinamo București in 2010

Personal information
- Date of birth: 8 August 1968 (age 58)
- Place of birth: Bucharest, Romania
- Height: 1.83 m (6 ft 0 in)
- Position: Goalkeeper

Youth career
- 1977–1985: Dinamo București

Senior career*
Years	Team	Apps	(Gls)
1985–1998	Dinamo București	165	(0)
1988–1990	→ Universitatea Cluj (loan)	56	(0)
1990–1992	→ Universitatea Craiova (loan)	48	(0)
1998	Universitatea Cluj	7	(0)
1998–1999	Erzurumspor	11	(0)
1999	Astra Ploiești	1	(0)
1999–2000	Universitatea Craiova	24	(0)
2000	Litex Lovech	8	(0)
2001–2002	Dinamo București	22	(0)
2002–2003	FCM Bacău	27	(0)
2003	FC Brașov	14	(0)
2004	FCM Bacău	15	(0)
2004–2005	Skoda Xanthi	2	(0)
2005–2006	Național București	4	(0)
Total		404	(0)

International career
1990–2001	Romania	41	(0)
1995	Europe XI	1	(0)

Managerial career
- 2003: FCM Bacău (president)
- 2010–2011: Dinamo București (sporting director)
- 2011–2012: Astra Ploiești (president)
- 2012–2017: Politehnica Iași (president)
- 2019–2020: Dinamo București (president)
- * Club domestic league appearances and goals

Florin Prunea (born 8 August 1968) is a Romanian former professional footballer who played as a goalkeeper.

== Club career ==
Prunea was born on 8 August 1968 in București, Romania. He began playing junior-level football in 1977 when he went to play for Steaua București, but was rejected there and shortly afterwards went to rivals, Dinamo București. There, coach Fane Stănculescu used him as a striker in his first three years and then he worked with Gheorghe Timar who started using him as a goalkeeper. Later in his youth career he was coached by Iosif Varga, and also during these years he was teammates with future national team competitor Bogdan Stelea.

Prunea made his Divizia A debut on 31 May 1986 under coach Mircea Lucescu in Dinamo's 5–0 loss to Sportul Studențesc București. However, he made only a few appearances in the first three seasons as his childhood idol, Dumitru Moraru, was still the first choice goalkeeper of The Red Dogs. Thus, he and other players were sent to Universitatea Cluj in exchange for Ioan Sabău. After two seasons spent as first choice goalkeeper at "U" Cluj, he joined Universitatea Craiova. In his first season he helped Craiova win The Double, being used by coach Sorin Cârțu in 32 league matches, also playing in the 2–1 victory in the Cupa României final against FC Bacău. In 1992, Prunea returned to Dinamo, where he lived his most steady period, remaining with the team for six seasons but without winning any trophies.

In the following years he switched many teams, first returning for a second spell at "U" Cluj. Then Prunea had his first experience abroad by playing for Turkish side Erzurumspor. He made his Süper Lig debut on 9 August 1998 under coach Sadi Tekelioğlu in a 5–1 away loss to Gençlerbirliği, totaling 11 matches in the competition. Subsequently, Prunea returned to Romania and played just one game in the 1999–2000 season for Astra Ploiești. He then joined "U" Craiova for the rest of the season, managing not to concede any goals for 633 consecutive minutes. Prunea had his second experience abroad, when he went to Litex Lovech in Bulgaria where he was teammates with fellow Romanian Valeriu Răchită. There, he was in the center of a controversy, being accused of match fixing after a game against Levski Sofia.

He returned to Dinamo in the middle of the 2000–01 season, helping them win the Cupa României, being used by coach Cornel Dinu in the 4–2 victory in the final against Rocar București. In the following season he helped the club win the title, but coaches Dinu and Marin Ion used him in only six games, as the team's first choice goalkeeper was Bogdan Lobonț. In the last years of his career, Prunea had two spells at FCM Bacău which were separated by a period spent at FC Brașov. Afterwards, he had his third and final spell abroad at Greek side Skoda Xanthi, where he was a teammate of compatriot Stelian Carabaș. His Super League Greece debut took place on 18 September 2004 under coach Giannis Mantzourakis in a 3–1 victory against Aris. Prunea ended his career at Național București, where he made his last Divizia A appearance on 5 November 2005 in a 3–2 loss to Oțelul Galați, totaling 383 matches in the competition and 17 games in European competitions (including three in the Intertoto Cup).

== International career ==
=== Early years ===
Prunea played 41 games in which he conceded 26 goals for Romania, making his debut on 5 December 1990 under coach Mircea Rădulescu in a 6–0 victory against San Marino in the Euro 1992 qualifiers. He made a total of three appearances during those qualifiers.

=== 1994 World Cup and Euro 1996 ===
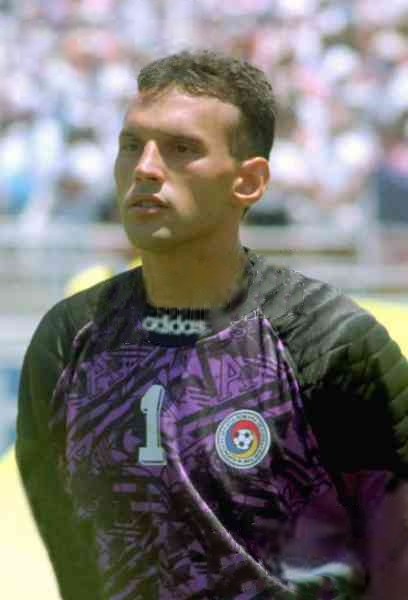
Prunea with Romania at the 1994 World Cup

He made another three appearances during the successful 1994 World Cup qualifiers. He was part of the "Golden Generation" that went to the final tournament. Coach Anghel Iordănescu used him in only one game in the group stage, where he kept a clean sheet in the 1–0 victory against USA, whereas Bogdan Stelea was preferred in the first two. Prunea played from the round of 16 onwards, as they got past Argentina with a 3–2 win, reaching the quarter-finals where they faced Sweden. There, with five minutes remaining in extra time, his side was leading 2–1. However, Prunea failed to intercept a 40-meter cross in time, allowing striker Kennet Andersson to level the score at 2–2. As a result, the game went to penalties, where Sweden won 5–4.

Prunea played one game during the successful Euro 1996 qualifiers. In the final tournament, the team lost all three group stage games against France, Bulgaria and Spain. Iordănescu used him only in the 2–1 loss to the Spanish side.

=== Final years ===
He played two games during the successful 1998 World Cup qualifiers and was selected by Iordănescu to be part of the final tournament squad, but did not play there. Prunea was also selected by coach Emerich Jenei to be part of the Euro 2000 final tournament squad, but again without playing there. On 25 April 2001 he made his last appearance for the national team in 0–0 friendly draw against Slovakia.

For representing his country during 1990–2000 at the World and European Cups final tournaments, Prunea was decorated by President of Romania Traian Băsescu on 25 March 2008 with the Ordinul "Meritul Sportiv" – (The Medal "The Sportive Merit") class III.

== Executive career ==
Prunea had his first experience as a club official, while still an active player, when he briefly served as president of FCM Bacău in 2003. After he ended his playing career, he held the position of director of international relations within the Romanian Football Federation from 2006 to 2009. Subsequently, he worked for several clubs: Dinamo București (2010–2011, sporting director), Astra Ploiești (2011–2012, president), Politehnica Iași (2012–2017, president), Dinamo București (2019–2020, president).

== Personal life ==
In 1994, Prunea was named Honorary Citizen of Bucharest.

== Career statistics ==
Appearances and goals by national team and year
National team	Year	Apps	Goals
Romania	1990	2	0
Romania	1991	6	0
Romania	1992	0	0
Romania	1993	8	0
Romania	1994	10	0
Romania	1995	2	0
Romania	1996	6	0
Romania	1997	1	0
Romania	1998	1	0
Romania	1999	0	0
Romania	2000	3	0
Romania	2001	2	0
Total		41	0

== Honours ==
Dinamo București

- Divizia A: 2001–02
- Cupa României: 1985–86, 2000–01
- Supercupa României runner-up: 2001

Universitatea Craiova

- Divizia A: 1990–91
- Cupa României: 1990–91

Universitatea Cluj

- Cupa Ligii runner-up: 1998

Național București

- Cupa României runner-up: 2005–06
