= Grațian Moldovan =

Romanian footballer

Personal information
- Full name: Grațian Petru Moldovan
- Date of birth: 29 September 1962 (age 64)
- Place of birth: Cugir, Romania
- Position: Midfielder

Senior career*
Years	Team	Apps	(Gls)
1982–1983	Metalurgistul Cugir		
1984	Dinamo București	11	(0)
1985	Corvinul Hunedoara	2	(0)
1990–1993	Metalurgistul Cugir (Note: The statistics for the 1990–91 Divizia B season are unavailable.)	43	(2)
Total		56	(2)
- * Club domestic league appearances and goals

Grațian Petru Moldovan (born 29 September 1962) is a Romanian former football midfielder. After he ended his playing career, Moldovan settled in Sterling Heights, Michigan.

== Honours ==
Dinamo București

- Divizia A: 1983–84
- Cupa României: 1983–84
