= Marian Damaschin =

Romanian footballer

Personal information
- Date of birth: 1 May 1965 (age 61)
- Place of birth: Urziceni, Romania
- Position: Striker

Youth career
- 1974–1980: FEROM Urziceni
- 1980–1983: Rapid București

Senior career*
Years	Team	Apps	(Gls)
1983–1984	Rapid București	25	(2)
1984–1985	Politehnica Iaşi	34	(9)
1985–1987	Dinamo București	48	(11)
1987–1989	Victoria București	42	(17)
1989–1991	Dinamo București	36	(16)
1991–1992	Feyenoord	29	(9)
1992–1993	Grenoble		
Total		214	(64)

International career
1986–1991	Romania	5	(0)
- * Club domestic league appearances and goals

Marian Damaschin (born 1 May 1965) is a Romanian former professional footballer who played as a striker.

== Club career ==
Damaschin was born on 1 May 1965 in Urziceni, Romania and began playing junior-level football in 1974 at local club FEROM. In 1980, he moved to Rapid București where he started his senior career during the 1982–83 Divizia B season, which concluded with the team earning promotion to the first division. In the following season he played 25 Divizia A matches for Rapid in which he scored two goals. In 1984 he was transferred to fellow Divizia A club Politehnica Iași. Damaschin spent one season at Politehnica in which he scored nine goals in 34 appearances, after which he went to Dinamo București.

On 28 May 1986, Damaschin opened the score in the 2–1 win over rivals Steaua București. Afterwards, on 25 June in the Cupa României final, coach Mircea Lucescu used him for the entire match, during which he scored the goal in the 1–0 victory against the same team. At the time of these two events, The Military Men were the recent winners of the European Cup. In the middle of the 1987–88 season, he was transferred to Victoria București in exchange for Claudiu Vaișcovici. Damaschin helped Victoria reach the quarter-finals in the 1988–89 UEFA Cup, playing eight games in the campaign. Afterwards he made a comeback to Dinamo where in the 1989–90 season, coach Lucescu gave him five league games in which he scored once, as the team won The Double. In the same season they reached the 1989–90 UEFA Cup Winners' Cup semi-finals with him playing one game in the campaign. In the following season he scored 15 goals in 31 Divizia A matches for Dinamo, including one in a 1–0 victory against Steaua.

Afterwards, Damaschin went to play in Netherlands at Feyenoord where he was a colleague of fellow Romanian, Ioan Sabău. He made his debut on 14 August 1991 when coach Hans Dorjee played him for the entire game in the 1–0 victory against PSV Eindhoven in the 1991 Dutch Supercup in which he netted the goal. Three days later he made his Eredivise debut in a 1–0 win over Twente. He scored his first goal on 3 September 1991 in a 1–1 home draw against Roda JC. Until the end of the season, Damaschin made 29 appearances in the league, netting nine goals, including one in a 2–0 De Klassieker victory against Ajax, helping The Club on the Meuse finish third. He also played two games, scoring once as Feyenoord won the 1991–92 Dutch Cup and made five appearances in the 1991–92 European Cup Winners' Cup as they reached the semi-finals where he scored one goal against AS Monaco. Damaschin ended his career in 1993, after spending one season in France at the Championnat National club, Grenoble. He has a total of 185 Divizia A matches with 55 goals and 22 matches with two goals in European competitions.

== International career ==
Damaschin played five friendly games for Romania, making his debut on 2 March 1986 when coach Mircea Lucescu sent him in the 65th minute to replace Romulus Gabor in a 1–0 victory against Egypt. His following four games were two draws against Iraq and a 2–2 draw and a 1–0 loss against Norway, the last game being the only one in which he played as a starter.

== Personal life ==
His son, Mihai Damaschin, was also a footballer.

== Honours ==
Rapid București

- Divizia B: 1982–83

Dinamo București

- Divizia A: 1989–90
- Cupa României: 1985–86, 1989–90

Feyenoord

- Dutch Cup: 1991–92
- Dutch Supercup: 1991
