= Nelu Stănescu =

Romanian footballer

Personal information
- Date of birth: 4 August 1957
- Place of birth: Babadag, Romania
- Date of death: 11 March 2004 (aged 46)
- Place of death: Babadag, Romania
- Position: Left back

Senior career*
Years	Team	Apps	(Gls)
1973–1975	Granitul Babadag		
1975–1979	Delta Tulcea		
1979–1987	Dinamo București	163	(4)
1987–1988	Flacăra Moreni	26	(0)
1989	Delta Tulcea		
1989–1990	Olimpia Râmnicu Sărat		
Total		189	(4)

International career
1981–1988	Romania	6	(0)
- * Club domestic league appearances and goals

Nelu Stănescu (4 August 1957 – 11 March 2004) was a Romanian football left defender.

== Club career ==
Stănescu was born on 1 January 1956 in Babadag, Romania. He was a left defender and began playing football in the lower leagues for Granitul Babadag and Delta Tulcea. In 1979 he was transferred to Dinamo București where on 2 September he made his Divizia A debut under coach Angelo Niculescu in a 2–0 victory against Olimpia Satu Mare. Stănescu won three consecutive Divizia A titles from 1982 until 1984. In the first one, coach Valentin Stănescu used him in 28 matches. In the following two he worked with Nicolae Dumitru who gave him 14 appearances in the first and 26 in which he scored two goals in the second. Stănescu also won three Cupa României with The Red Dogs, but he did not play in the 1982 final against FC Baia Mare. In the 1984 final, coach Dumitru used him as a starter, then replaced him after 24 minutes with Ioan Mărginean in the 2–1 win over rivals Steaua București. In the 1986 final, under coach Mircea Lucescu he played the entire match in the 1–0 victory against Steaua which had recently won the European Cup. Stănescu appeared in 18 matches for Dinamo in European competitions, making some notable performances as helping it eliminate Inter Milan in the 1981–82 UEFA Cup. Subsequently, he played six matches in the 1983–84 European Cup edition, as the club eliminated title holders Hamburg in the campaign, reaching the semi-finals where they were defeated by Liverpool. After eight seasons spent at Dinamo, he was transferred to Flacăra Moreni where he made his last Divizia A appearance on 3 December 1988 in a 2–0 victory against ASA Târgu Mureș, totaling 189 matches with four goals in the competition. Stănescu ended his career in 1990 after playing for Delta Tulcea and Olimpia Râmnicu Sărat in Divizia B.

== International career ==
Stănescu played six games for Romania, making his debut on 11 November 1981 under coach Mircea Lucescu in a 0–0 draw against Switzerland in the 1982 World Cup qualifiers. His following games played for the national team were friendlies, his last appearance taking place on 30 March 1988 in a 3–3 draw against East Germany.

== Style of play ==
His former Dinamo teammate Marin Dragnea talked about Stănescu's style of play in a 2022 Gazeta Sporturilor interview:"I think the word tenacity would best characterize him. He had positive malice in the game, total dedication to the colors of the club, never abandoning the fight. Excellent defender, who often went up offensively. His partnership with Orac on the left wing resulted in plenty of ideal crosses for the forwards. Even I scored quite a few goals due to their actions."

== Death ==
On 11 March 2004, Stănescu died at age 46 in his native Babadag. Shortly after his death, Marius Lăcătuș said:"Too bad for him, he was one of the best opponents I had in my career!"

== Honours ==
Dinamo București

- Divizia A: 1981–82, 1982–83, 1983–84
- Cupa României: 1981–82, 1983–84, 1985–86
