= Ioan Varga =

Romanian footballer

Personal information
- Date of birth: 5 January 1959 (age 67)
- Place of birth: Iclod, Romania
- Positions: Midfielder; centre back

Senior career*
Years	Team	Apps	(Gls)
1978–1979	Mureșul Deva	20	(1)
1979–1985	Jiul Petroșani	188	(30)
1985–1989	Dinamo București	120	(15)
1989–1990	Jiul Petroșani	38	(1)
1991	Újpest	15	(0)
Total		381	(47)

International career
1982	Romania B	1	(0)
1986–1987	Romania Olympic	8	(0)
- * Club domestic league appearances and goals as of 24 January 2020

Ioan Varga (born 5 January 1959) is a Romanian former footballer who played as a midfielder.

== Club career ==
Varga was born on 5 January 1959 in Iclod, Romania. He started his senior football career in 1978 at Divizia B club Mureșul Deva. After one season he joined Jiul Petroșani where on 12 August 1979 he made his Divizia A debut under coach Nicolae Oaidă in a 1–0 home loss to Sportul Studențesc București. In the 1983–84 season, Varga netted a personal record of eight league goals.

In 1985 he went to Dinamo București. In his first season he won the Cupa României, coach Mircea Lucescu using him the entire match in the final which ended with a 1–0 victory against rivals Steaua București who had recently won the European Cup. During his spell with The Red Dogs, Varga played 12 games in European competitions. Notably, he made six appearances in the 1988–89 European Cup Winners' Cup campaign as the team reached the quarter-finals where they were eliminated on the away goals rule after 1–1 on aggregate by Sampdoria.

In 1989, Varga returned to Jiul Petroșani where on 9 December 1980 he made his last Divizia A appearance in a 3–1 home loss to Gloria Bistrița, totaling 346 matches with 46 goals in the competition.

In 1991 he had his only experience outside Romania at Hungarian side, Újpest. He made his Nemzeti Bajnokság I on 9 March, as coach Ferenc Kovács used him the entire match in a 1–0 away loss to Ferencváros. Varga made a total of 15 appearances in the Hungarian league, his last one taking place on 15 June 1991 in a 1–0 home win against Békéscsaba, retiring afterwards from professional football.

== International career ==
Between 1982 and 1987, Varga made several appearances for Romania's Olympic and B teams.

== Personal life ==
His son, Dacian, was also a footballer.

== Honours ==
Dinamo București

- Cupa României: 1985–86
