= Vasile Jercălău =

Romanian footballer

Personal information
- Date of birth: 5 May 1968 (age 58)
- Place of birth: Adâncata, Romania
- Height: 1.72 m (5 ft 8 in)
- Position: Defender

Senior career*
Years	Team	Apps	(Gls)
1985–1988	Dinamo București	31	(0)
1988–1990	SC Bacău	45	(4)
1989	→ Flacăra Moreni (loan)	9	(0)
1990–1992	FC Bacău	42	(7)
1992–1993	Dinamo București	17	(0)
1993–1995	Selena Bacău	35	(16)
1995–1996	AS Bacău	32	(9)
1996–1997	FCM Bacău	16	(3)
1997–2000	FC Onești	109	(8)
2001–2005	Apulum Alba Iulia	112	(17)
2002	→ Minaur Zlatna (loan)	12	(0)
2005–2006	Unirea Urziceni	16	(0)
Total		476	(64)

Managerial career
- 2014–: FC Bacău (youth)
- * Club domestic league appearances and goals as of 2 May 2016

Vasile Jercălău (born 5 May 1968) is a Romanian former professional footballer.
