= Lică Movilă =

Romanian footballer

Personal information
- Full name: Lică Stavarache Movilă
- Date of birth: 21 October 1961 (age 65)
- Place of birth: Brăila, Romania
- Height: 1.86 m (6 ft 1 in)
- Position: Midfielder

Youth career
- SC Bacău

Senior career*
Years	Team	Apps	(Gls)
1978–1982	SC Bacău	19	(3)
1983–1988	Dinamo București	138	(17)
1988–1989	Flacăra Moreni	23	(2)
1989–1990	Universitatea Cluj	19	(1)
1991	Zimbru Chișinău	23	(2)
1992	Hapoel Be'er Sheva	3	(1)
Total		225	(26)

International career
1982–1983	Romania U21	5	(0)
1983–1987	Romania	14	(1)
- * Club domestic league appearances and goals

Lică Stavarache Movilă (born 21 October 1961) is a Romanian former professional footballer who played as a midfielder.

== Club career ==
Movilă was born on 21 October 1961 in Brăila, Romania. He made his Divizia A debut on 21 June 1981, playing for SC Bacău under coach Angelo Niculescu in a 5–2 loss to Argeș Pitești. Midway through the 1982–83 season, he was transferred to Dinamo București.

In his first two seasons at Dinamo he won the title under coach Nicolae Dumitru. He appeared in 16 matches with four goals scored in the first season and made 19 appearances with one goal in the second. During his period spent with The Red Dogs, Movilă also won two Cupa României. In the 2–1 victory over rivals Steaua București in the 1984 final, coach Dumitru did not use him, but in the 1986 final, coach Mircea Lucescu used him the entire match in the 1–0 win against the same team which had recently won the European Cup. Movilă played 16 games in which he scored two goals in European competitions. In the 1983–84 European Cup edition, he appeared in seven games and scored one goal against Kuusysi Lahti, as Dinamo eliminated title holders Hamburg in the campaign, reaching the semi-finals where they were defeated by Liverpool. During the first leg against the English team, Movilă's jaw was broken by a punch from Graeme Souness, who avoided a red card because the referee missed the incident.

In 1988 he left Dinamo, going for one season to Flacăra Moreni. Afterwards, Movilă joined Universitatea Cluj where on 14 April 1990 he made his last Divizia A appearance in a 2–1 away loss to Jiul Petroșani, totaling 199 matches with 23 goals in the competition. Subsequently, he played alongside fellow Romanian Claudiu Vaișcovici for Zimbru Chișinău in the 1991 Soviet First League. In 1992, Movilă ended his career after playing for Israeli side Hapoel Be'er Sheva.

== International career ==
Movilă played 14 games in which he scored one goal for Romania, making his debut on 1 June 1983 when coach Mircea Lucescu sent him in the 70th minute to replace Gheorghe Mulțescu in a 1–0 friendly loss to Yugoslavia. He scored his only goal for the national team in a friendly that ended in a 2–2 draw against Poland. Movilă made one appearance during the 1986 World Cup qualifiers in a 3–2 away loss to Northern Ireland. On 8 April 1987, he played his last match for The Tricolours in a 3–2 friendly win over Israel.

== Career statistics ==
Scores and results list Romania's goal tally first, score column indicates score after each Movilă goal.

List of international goals scored by Lică Movilă
#	Date	Venue	Cap	Opponent	Score	Result	Competition
1	7 September 1983	Stadion Miejski, Kraków, Poland	4	Poland	1–0	2–2	Friendly

== Honours ==
Dinamo București

- Divizia A: 1982–83, 1983–84
- Cupa României: 1983–84, 1985–86
