= 1989–90 Cupa României =

Tournament details
- Country: Romania

Final positions
- Champions: Dinamo București
- Runners-up: Steaua București

The 1989–90 Cupa României was the 52nd edition of Romania's most prestigious football cup competition.

The title was won by Dinamo București against Steaua București.

== Format ==
The competition is an annual knockout tournament.

First round proper matches are played on the ground of the lowest ranked team, then from the second round proper the matches are played on a neutral location.

If a match is drawn after 90 minutes, the game goes in extra time, if the scored is still tight after 120 minutes, then the winner will be established at penalty kicks.

From the first edition, the teams from Divizia A entered in competition in sixteen finals, rule which remained till today.

== First round proper ==
Team 1	Score	Team 2
21 February 1990‡
Unirea Alba Iulia (Div. B)	1–3	(Div. A) Corvinul Hunedoara
Strungul Arad (Div. B)	2–1	(Div. A) Flacăra Moreni
Rapid București (Div. B)	2–1	(Div. A) Argeş Piteşti
Dermata Cluj (Div. D)	1–0	(Div. A) SC Bacău
Electroputere Craiova (Div. C)	2–0	(Div. A) Universitatea Cluj
Metalurgistul Cugir (Div. C)	1–0 (a.e.t.)	(Div. A) Sportul Studenţesc București
CSM Borzești (Div. C)	0–1 (a.e.t.)	(Div. A) Jiul Petroșani

Notes:

- ‡ Because the fixture was wrong, in this leg of competition played 7 teams from inferior divisions.

== Second round proper ==
Team 1	Score	Team 2
27 February 1990
Dinamo București	2–0	Jiul Petroșani
Electroputere Craiova	1–1 (a.e.t.)(4–3 p)	Inter Sibiu
28 February 1990
Bihor Oradea	1–4	Politehnica Timișoara
Dermata Cluj	1–8	Steaua București
Rapid București	0–1	Farul Constanța
Petrolul Ploiești	3–0	Metalurgistul Cugir
Strungul Arad	4–5 (a.e.t.)	Universitatea Craiova
FCM Brașov	3–2	Corvinul Hunedoara

== Quarter-finals ==
Team 1	Score	Team 2
10 March 1990
Steaua București	2–1	Farul Constanța
11 March 1990
Petrolul Ploiești	2–1 (a.e.t.)	FCM Brașov
Electroputere Craiova	0–1	Universitatea Craiova
Dinamo București	3–1	Politehnica Timișoara

== Semi-finals ==
Team 1	Score	Team 2
11 April 1990
Steaua București	3–0	Petrolul Ploiești
Dinamo București	0–0 (a.e.t.)(4–3 p)	Universitatea Craiova

== Final ==
2 May 1990
17:00 EET

Dinamo București	6–4	Steaua București
Răducioiu 3', 42', 82'; Mateuț 39'; Sabău 47'; Lupu 56'	Report	Dumitrescu 22'; Lăcătuș 68'; Rotariu 70'; Ungureanu 85'

23 August, Bucharest
Attendance: 30,000
Referee: Mircea Salomir (Cluj-Napoca)

Cupa României 1989–90 winners

7th title
