= Dănuț Lupu =

Romanian footballer

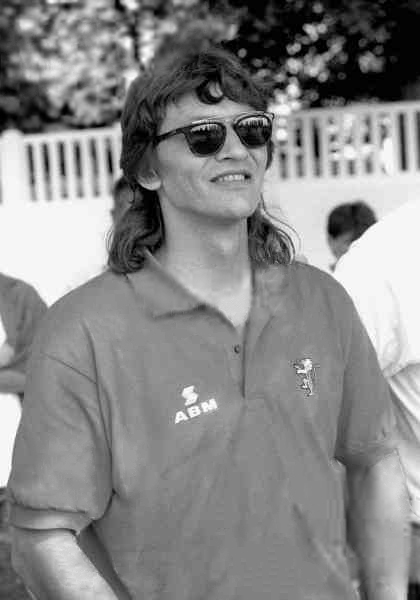
- Lupu in 1994

Personal information
- Date of birth: 27 February 1967 (age 59)
- Place of birth: Galați, Romania
- Height: 1.85 m (6 ft 1 in)
- Position: Central midfielder

Team information
- Current team: ACS FC Dinamo (chairman)

Youth career
- 1981–1985: Dunărea Galați

Senior career*
Years	Team	Apps	(Gls)
1985–1986	Dunărea Galați		
1987–1990	Dinamo București	90	(17)
1990–1991	Panathinaikos	10	(1)
1991–1993	Korinthos	47	(3)
1993	OFI	9	(1)
1994	Rapid București	2	(0)
1994	Brescia	15	(1)
1995	Rapid București	13	(6)
1995–1997	Dinamo București	42	(7)
1997–2000	Rapid București	77	(13)
2000	Dinamo București	4	(1)
2001	Laminorul Roman	1	(0)
2001	Tzafririm Holon	1	(0)
Total		311	(50)

International career
1989–1998	Romania	14	(0)
- * Club domestic league appearances and goals

Dănuț Lupu (born 27 February 1967) is a Romanian former professional footballer who played as a central midfielder.

== Club career ==
Lupu was born on 27 February 1967 in Galați, Romania and began simultaneously practicing football and ice hockey as a child, when he decided to concentrate exclusively on his football career. In 1985 he started to play professional football for Dunărea Galați in Divizia B. Two years later he was transferred to Dinamo București where he was wanted by coach Mircea Lucescu, playing his first Divizia A match on 8 March 1987 in a 2–0 win against FC Brașov. The club managed to win The Double in the 1989–90 season, Lupu contributing with six goals scored in the 22 league matches that Lucescu used him, and he also netted one goal in the 6–4 victory in the Cupa României final against Steaua București. He also made some performances in European competitions, helping The Red Dogs reach the quarter-finals in the 1988–89 European Cup Winners' Cup where they were eliminated on the away goals rule after 1–1 on aggregate by Sampdoria. In the following edition of the same competition, Dinamo reached the semi-finals where they were eliminated after a 2–0 aggregate loss to Anderlecht with Lupu playing seven games in the campaign.

After the fall of communism in December 1989, Lupu moved to Greece and signed with Panathinaikos which paid Dinamo a transfer fee estimated between $1.2 – 2 million. He won the championship with The Greens, although he played there only 10 league games in which he scored one goal. During his time in Greece, he also had spells at Korinthos and OFI, totaling 66 appearances with five goals scored in the Alpha Ethniki competition. With OFI he also reached the round of 16 in the 1993–94 UEFA Cup, eliminating Atlético Madrid in the process.

In 1994, Lupu returned to Romania at Rapid București, but after only two league games played, he joined Lucescu's "Brescia Romena", as around that period, his fellow Romanians Gheorghe Hagi, Florin Răducioiu, Ioan Sabău and Dorin Mateuț also played for the club. He made his Serie A debut on 4 September 1994, playing as a starter in a 1–1 draw against Juventus. He played a total of 15 matches in the Italian league, scoring one goal in a 1–0 home victory against Reggiana. Subsequently, Lupu returned to play for a short while at Rapid, after which he spent the next two seasons with Dinamo. In 1997, when Lucescu became Rapid's coach, Lupu returned for a third spell at The Railwaymen, and after winning the Cupa României in the first season, he won the championship in the following one, contributing with five goals scored in 28 matches. He then played the entire match in the 5–0 win over Steaua in the 1999 Supercupa României. In 2000 he returned for a third spell at Dinamo in which he made his last Divizia A appearance on 27 August in a 2–1 loss to Oțelul Galați, totaling 228 matches with 44 goals in the competition. Afterwards he played for Laminorul Roman in the Romanian second league and ended his career in Israel at Hapoel Tzafririm.

In the European Cups, Lupu played for Dinamo București, Panathinaikos, OFI and Rapid a total of 39 matches in which he scored three goals (including seven appearances in the Intertoto Cup).

== International career ==
Lupu played 14 matches without scoring for Romania, making his debut on 11 October 1989 when coach Emerich Jenei sent him in the 64th minute to replace Ioan Sabău in a 1990 World Cup qualification match that ended with a 3–0 loss to Denmark. He also appeared in the 3–1 victory in the second leg against the Danes. Coach Jenei used him in two games during the 1990 World Cup final tournament, a 1–1 draw in the group stage against Argentina and a 0–0 (5–4, after penalty kicks) loss to Ireland in the round of 16. Lupu played four games in the successful Euro 1996 qualifiers, but was not part of the squad that went to the final tournament. He made his last appearance for the national team on 18 March 1998 in a 1–0 friendly loss to Israel.

== Style of play ==
Lupu was a player known for his dribbling and passing abilities. When his former coach, Mircea Lucescu was asked "What did Lupu lack to be at Hagi's level?", Lucescu answered:"He didn't lack talent, especially since he also played hockey and had very strong legs, which enabled him to balance well on the field. I did not see him fall on the field. I remember a match at Brescia against Desailly (n.b. Marcel Desailly, ex-Milan defender and world champion with France), he crushed him in a one-on-one contest. He was lacking Gică Hagi's ambition. Perhaps, if he had been more ambitious, he would have taken football more seriously. He didn't take it very seriously. He loved football, but he did not respect it. I would tell him what to do and he would understand immediately, very intelligently. I remember that cube appeared (the Rubik's Cube)... no one could do it. He did it immediately. He had an extraordinary memory. He lacked that basic education."

== Controversies ==
During Dinamo's stay in Dundee for a game against Dundee United in the 1988–89 European Cup Winners' Cup, Lupu was arrested for shoplifting, but was released after coach Mircea Lucescu went to the police station and convinced the prosecutor to not give him a criminal record.

While playing for Panathinaikos, Lupu was arrested in Athens and spent two and a half months in jail, being accused of being the leader of a gang of Romanian thieves who had stolen cars in Greece. Lupu claims he was arrested because Panathinaikos's president Yiorgos Vardinogiannis wanted him to sign the termination of the contract and to give up insisting to receive his unpaid salaries.

In 2005 he was caught at an airport in București with €79,000 undeclared stashed in shoe boxes; also, in the same year he was caught driving an unregistered car.

In early October 2023, the Bucharest Court of Appeal sentenced Lupu to seven months and 10 days in jail for repeated driving without a license. He was released after six months in early April 2024.

== Personal life ==
His nephew, Valentin Balint, was also a footballer who started his career at Dinamo București.

== Career statistics ==
Appearances and goals by national team and year.
National team	Year	Apps	Goals
Romania	1989	2	0
Romania	1990	7	0
Romania	1995	4	0
Romania	1998	1	0
Total		14	0

== Honours ==
Dinamo București

- Divizia A: 1989–90
- Cupa României: 1989–90

Panathinaikos

- Alpha Ethniki: 1990–91
- Greek Cup: 1990–91

Rapid București

- Divizia A: 1998–99
- Cupa României: 1997–98
- Supercupa României: 1999
