= Alexandru Nicolae =

Romanian footballer

Personal information
- Date of birth: 17 March 1955 (age 71)
- Place of birth: Bucharest, Romania
- Position: Defender

Youth career
- 1968–1973: ȘSE 2 București
- 1973–1974: Sportul Studențesc București

Senior career*
Years	Team	Apps	(Gls)
1974–1980	Gloria Buzău (Note: The statistics for the 1974–75, 1975–76, 1976–77 and 1977–78 Divizia B seasons are unavailable.)	58	(1)
1982–1982	Olt Scornicești	62	(4)
1982–1989	Dinamo București	168	(10)
1989	Victoria București	3	(0)
1990–1991	Dinamo București	10	(0)
Total		301	(15)

International career
1979–1987	Romania	19	(1)
- * Club domestic league appearances and goals

Alexandru Nicolae (born 17 March 1955) is a Romanian former football defender.

== Club career ==
Nicolae was born on 17 March 1955 in Bucharest, Romania and began playing junior-level football in 1968 at ȘSE 2 București. In 1973 he went to Sportul Studențesc București's youth academy. He started his senior career in 1974, playing four seasons in Divizia B at Gloria Buzău, helping the team get promoted to Divizia A. Subsequently, he made his debut in the competition on 24 August 1978 under coach Ion Ionescu in a 1–0 loss to CS Târgoviște. Two years later, Nicolae joined Olt Scornicești for two seasons and despite having offers from Steaua București during this period, he chose in 1982 to pursue his dream of playing for Dinamo București.

In his first two seasons at Dinamo, the club won two consecutive league titles. Coach Nicolae Dumitru played him 30 games in each of those seasons and in the first he also scored four goals, one of them in a 1–1 draw against rivals Steaua. Nicolae also won two Cupa României with The Red Dogs. In the 1984 final, coach Dumitru played him for the full 90 minutes in their 2–1 victory over Steaua. Two years later, in the 1986 final, coach Mircea Lucescu also utilized him for the entire match, securing a 1–0 win against the same club, which had recently claimed the European Cup. Nicolae appeared in seven matches in the 1983–84 European Cup edition, as the club eliminated title holders Hamburg in the campaign, reaching the semi-finals where they were defeated by Liverpool. He also played one game against Sampdoria in the quarter-finals of the 1988–89 European Cup Winners' Cup where the Italians eliminated them on the away goals rule after 1–1 on aggregate.

In 1989, Nicolae alongside teammates Dumitru Moraru and Costel Orac were transferred from Dinamo to Victoria București. He spent there only half a season, appearing in three league games and made one appearance in a 3–1 loss to Valencia in the 1989–90 UEFA Cup. He returned for the second half of the season to Dinamo where he won The Double, coach Lucescu using him in five league games, but he did play in the 6–4 win over Steaua in the Cupa României final. Nicolae made his last Divizia A appearance on 11 May 1991 in Dinamo's 3–0 victory against Universitatea Craiova, totaling 301 games with 15 goals in the competition and 24 matches in European competitions.

== International career ==
Nicolae played 19 games for Romania, managing to score one goal in his debut which took place on 14 October 1979 under coach Constantin Cernăianu in a 3–1 friendly loss to the Soviet Union. He played in four qualification matches for the Euro 1980 and 1984 tournaments, also appearing in one qualification match for the 1982 World Cup. His last appearance for the national team took place on 2 September 1987 in a friendly against Poland which ended with a 3–1 loss.

=== International goals ===
Scores and results list Romania's goal tally first, score column indicates score after each Nicolae goal.

List of international goals scored by Alexandru Nicolae
#	Date	Venue	Cap	Opponent	Score	Result	Competition
1	14 October 1979	Lenin Central Stadium, Moscow, Soviet Union	1	Soviet Union	1–2	1–3	Friendly

== Honours ==
Gloria Buzău

- Divizia B: 1977–78

Dinamo București

- Divizia A: 1982–83, 1983–84, 1989–90
- Cupa României: 1983–84, 1985–86, 1989–90
