= Dorin Mateuț =

Romanian footballer

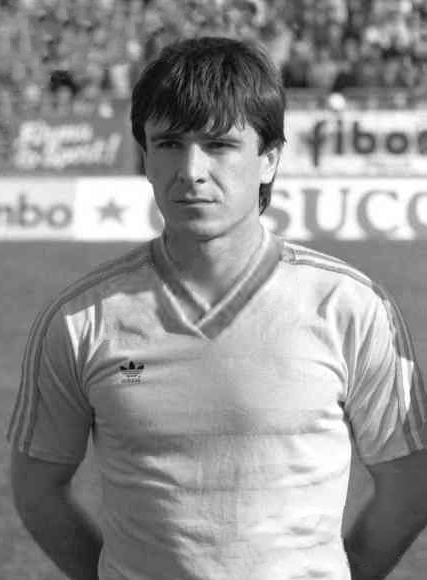
- Mateuț in 1989

Personal information
- Date of birth: 2 August 1965 (age 61)
- Place of birth: Bogata-Curtuiuș, Romania
- Height: 1.69 m (5 ft 7 in)
- Position: Attacking midfielder

Youth career
- 1979–1981: Corvinul Hunedoara

Senior career*
Years	Team	Apps	(Gls)
1981–1986	Corvinul Hunedoara	132	(36)
1987–1990	Dinamo București	109	(80)
1991–1992	Zaragoza	58	(10)
1993	Brescia	4	(0)
1994	Reggiana	25	(3)
1995	Dinamo București	37	(8)
1996	Sportul Studențesc	3	(0)
Total		368	(137)

International career
1985	Romania U21	1	(0)
1984–1991	Romania	57	(11)

Managerial career
- 2003–2005: Dinamo București (assistant)
- 2013–2014: Dinamo București (assistant)
- * Club domestic league appearances and goals

Dorin Mateuț (born 2 August 1965) is a Romanian former professional footballer who played as an attacking midfielder.

== Club career ==
=== Corvinul Hunedoara ===
Mateuț was born in Bogata-Curtuiuș, Cluj County, Romania, on 2 August 1965, but his birth was declared by his family to the authorities on 5 August. He made his Divizia A debut on 14 October 1981, playing for Corvinul Hunedoara in a 3–1 victory against Olt Scornicești under coach Mircea Lucescu. The highlight of his five and a half seasons spent at Corvinul was a third place in the 1981–82 Divizia A season. He also appeared in three games in the 1982–83 UEFA Cup campaign, as they got past Grazer AK in the first round, being eliminated in the following one by FK Sarajevo against whom he scored a goal.

=== Dinamo București ===
Mateuț was transferred in the middle of the 1986–87 season to Dinamo București. He scored an astounding 43 goals, with only one penalty kick among them, to take the top-scorer title and even the European Golden Boot in the 1988–89 season. In the same season he scored two goals against Dundee United in the 1988–89 European Cup Winners' Cup campaign as the team reached the quarter-finals where they were eliminated on the away goals rule after 1–1 on aggregate by Sampdoria. For the way he played in 1988, Mateuț was named the Romanian Footballer of the Year. In the 1989–90 season, Mateuț helped Dinamo win The Double, coach Lucescu giving him 22 league appearances in which he netted nine goals, and he scored one goal in the Cupa României final that ended with a 6–4 victory against rivals Steaua București. He also scored one goal against Dinamo Tirana, then three goals against Panathinaikos in eight matches in the 1989–90 European Cup Winners' Cup as the club reached the semi-finals where they were eliminated after 2–0 on aggregate by Anderlecht. In addition to his goal scored in the Cupa României final, he also scored two league goals in the derby against Steaua that helped his side earn one victory and one draw.

=== Real Zaragoza ===
After the 1989 Romanian Revolution, Mateuț went to play abroad, in Spain at Real Zaragoza. He made his La Liga debut on 14 October 1990 under coach Ildo Maneiro in a 1–1 draw against Betis Sevilla. In the following three games he scored a goal in a 2–2 draw against Real Valladolid, netted both goals of the 2–0 win over Tenerife and the only goal in the 1–0 victory against Athletic Bilbao, scoring seven league goals by season's end. In the next season he scored only three league goals, but before leaving the club he netted a hat-trick in November 1992 against Boldklubben Frem in a 5–1 win in the second round of the 1992–93 UEFA Cup.

=== Brescia and Reggiana ===
Mateuț joined Mircea Lucescu's "Brescia Romena", as around that period, his fellow Romanians Gheorghe Hagi, Florin Răducioiu, Ioan Sabău and Dănuț Lupu also played for the club. He made his Serie A debut on 29 November 1992 in a 2–1 away loss to Inter Milan.

In the following season he left Brescia to go and play for Reggiana where in his first game he netted a goal in a 2–0 win over Cremonese. Until the end of the season he scored two more goals in another two victories against Cagliari and Lecce.

=== Return to Romania ===
In 1995, Mateuț made a comeback to Dinamo for one and a half years. Subsequently, he joined Sportul Studențesc where he made his last Divizia A appearance on 23 March 1996 in a 1–0 victory against Ceahlăul Piatra Neamț, totaling 281 matches with 134 goals in the competition and 25 games with 12 goals in European competitions.

== International career ==
Mateuț played 56 matches and scored 10 goals for Romania, making his debut on 7 February 1984 when coach Mircea Lucescu sent him in the 81st minute to replace Aurel Țicleanu in a 1–1 friendly draw against Algeria. In his following game, a 2–0 friendly victory against Greece, Mateuț scored his first goal. He played four games, scoring one goal in the 1986 World Cup qualifiers and five games in which he scored once during the Euro 1988 qualifiers.

Mateuț netted two goals in six games in the successful 1990 World Cup qualifiers. Coach Emerich Jenei selected him to be part of the final tournament squad, where he played only in the final minutes of a group game against Argentina that ended in a 1–1 draw. The campaign ended in the round of 16. Mateuț appeared in six games in which he scored two goals during the Euro 1992 qualifiers, including his last game for the national team that was a 1–1 draw against Bulgaria.

For representing his country at the 1990 World Cup, Mateuț was decorated by President of Romania Traian Băsescu on 25 March 2008 with the Ordinul "Meritul Sportiv" – (The Medal "The Sportive Merit") class III.

== Career statistics ==
Appearances and goals by national team and year
National team	Year	Apps	Goals
Romania	1984	6	2
Romania	1985	7	1
Romania	1986	8	1
Romania	1987	8	1
Romania	1988	8	4
Romania	1989	7	0
Romania	1990	7	1
Romania	1991	6	1
Total		57	11

Scores and results list Romania's goal tally first, score column indicates score after each Mateuț goal.

List of international goals scored by Dorin Mateuț
Goal	Date	Venue	Opponent	Score	Result	Competition
1	7 March 1984	Stadionul Central, Craiova, Romania	Greece	2–0	2–0	Friendly
2	5 December 1984	Olympiakó Stádio, Athens, Greece	Greece	1–1	1–2	Friendly
3	28 August 1985	Stadionul 1 Mai, Timișoara, Romania	Finland	2–0	2–0	1986 World Cup qualifiers
4	4 June 1986	Stadionul 23 August, Bucharest, Romania	Norway	3–1	3–1	Friendly
5	29 April 1987	Stadionul Steaua, Bucharest, Romania	Spain	2–0	3–1	Euro 1988 qualifiers
6	19 October 1988	Vasil Levski National Stadium, Sofia, Bulgaria	Bulgaria	1–0	3–1	1990 World Cup qualifiers
7	2 November 1988	Stadionul Steaua, Bucharest, Romania	Greece	1–0	3–0	1990 World Cup qualifiers
8	23 November 1988	Stadionul Municipal, Sibiu, Romania	Israel	2–0	3–0	Friendly
9	23 November 1988	Stadionul Municipal, Sibiu, Romania	Israel	3–0	3–0	Friendly
10	5 December 1990	Stadionul Național, Bucharest, Romania	San Marino	2–0	6–0	Euro 1992 qualifiers
11	13 November 1991	Stadionul Steaua, Bucharest, Romania	Switzerland	1–0	1–0	Euro 1992 qualifiers

== Honours ==
Dinamo București

- Divizia A: 1989–90
- Cupa României: 1989–90

Individual

- Divizia A top scorer: 1988–89
- Gazeta Sporturilor Romanian Footballer of the Year: 1988
- European Golden Shoe: 1988–89
