= Costel Orac =

Romanian footballer and coach

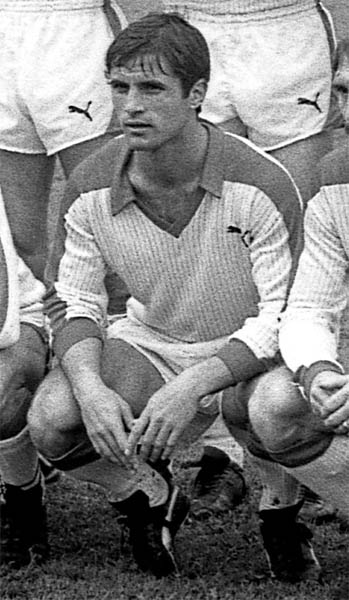
- Orac in 1984

Personal information
- Full name: Constantin Orac
- Date of birth: 22 January 1959 (age 67)
- Place of birth: Galați, Romania
- Height: 1.70 m (5 ft 7 in)
- Position: Striker

Team information
- Current team: Concordia Chiajna (youth center director)

Youth career
- 1970–1971: Politehnica Galați
- 1971–1976: FCM Galați

Senior career*
Years	Team	Apps	(Gls)
1976–1981	FCM Galați	90	(11)
1981–1989	Dinamo București	217	(41)
1989–1990	Victoria București	2	(1)
1990	Étoile Carouge	25	(14)
1991	Dinamo București	6	(1)
1991–1992	Unirea Focșani	22	(13)
Total		372	(91)

International career
	Romania U21	3	(0)
	Romania Olympic team	5	(0)
1984–1986	Romania	3	(1)

Managerial career
- 1991–1992: Unirea Focșani (player/assistant)
- 1992–1994: Unirea Focșani
- 1994–1995: Selena Bacău
- 1996–1997: Alki Larnaca
- 1997–1998: FC Brașov
- 1999–2000: Bihor Oradea
- 2000–2001: FCM Poiana Câmpina
- 2001–2002: FC Baia Mare
- 2002–2003: Oțelul Galați
- 2004–2005: Botoșani
- 2005–2006: Unirea Urziceni
- 2006–2007: Otopeni
- 2007–2008: FCM Bacău
- 2009: Dinamo București (assistant)
- 2009–2010: Dinamo II București
- 2010–2011: Concordia Chiajna
- 2011–2012: Botoșani
- 2014–: Concordia Chiajna (Youth Center director)
- 2020–2021: Concordia Chiajna (caretaker)
- * Club domestic league appearances and goals

Costel Orac (born 22 January 1959) is a Romanian football coach and former player.

== Club career ==
Orac was born on 22 January 1959 in Galați, Romania and began playing junior-level football in 1970 at local club Politehnica, moving one year later to neighboring club FCM. He made his Divizia A debut on 22 August 1976, playing for FCM Galați under coach Gheorghe Nuțescu in a 1–0 loss to Jiul Petroșani. The team was relegated after his first season, but he stayed with the club, helping it get promoted back to the first league after two years.

After playing five seasons in the first two leagues for FCM Galați, Orac was transferred to Dinamo București together with teammate Nicușor Vlad. There, for several years he would form a successful offensive trio with Ionel Augustin and Gheorghe Mulțescu, together being called "AMO" by the fans, a nickname inspired by the initials of their family names. In his first three seasons spent at Dinamo, he won the league title in all of them. In the first one, he played 32 matches under coach Valentin Stănescu, scoring a personal record of nine goals. In the following two seasons, he worked with coach Nicolae Dumitru who gave him 30 appearances in which he scored four goals in the first, and then 23 games with five goals netted in the second. Orac also won three Cupa României with The Red Dogs, playing in all the finals. In the 1982 final, he played the entire match in the 3–2 win over FC Baia Mare and in the one from 1984 he scored the decisive goal in the 2–1 victory against rivals Steaua București. In the 1986 final, under the guidance of coach Mircea Lucescu he played the whole match in the 1–0 win over Steaua who had recently won the European Cup. Orac appeared in 26 matches in which he scored five goals for Dinamo in European competitions, making notable performances, such as helping to eliminate Inter Milan by scoring the decisive goal of the 3–2 victory in the second leg in the 1981–82 UEFA Cup. He also played seven games in the 1983–84 European Cup campaign, scoring one goal in a 3–0 victory in the first leg that helped them eliminate title holders Hamburg and his side's only goal in the 3–1 aggregate loss in the semi-finals where they were defeated by Liverpool.

In 1989, Orac alongside teammates Dumitru Moraru and Alexandru Nicolae were transferred from Dinamo to Victoria București. There, because of a conflict he had with coach Florin Halagian, he played only two league games in which he scored once and made one appearance in the 1989–90 UEFA Cup, where he gave an assist in a 1–1 draw against Valencia. After the 1989 Romanian Revolution, Orac went to play in the Nationalliga B where he was recommended by coach Mircea Lucescu to Étoile Carouge's coach Radu Nunweiller. In Switzerland, following an injury, a medical examination revealed he had back problems. Subsequently, he returned to Dinamo for a short while, making his last appearance in Divizia A on 11 May 1991 in a 1–1 draw against Universitatea Craiova, totaling 308 matches with 54 goals in the competition. Orac ended his career in 1992, after playing one season in Divizia B for Unirea Focșani.

== International career ==
Orac played three friendly games for Romania, making his debut on 29 July 1984 under coach Mircea Lucescu in a 4–2 win over China in which he scored one goal. His following two games were draws: a 1–1 and a 0–0 against Iraq.

== Managerial career ==
Orac started his coaching career while he was still an active player, being an assistant at Unirea Focșani in the 1991–92 Divizia B season. He transitioned to a head coach role at Focșani starting with the following season. In 1996, he had his only coaching experience outside Romania, for one and a half seasons in the Cypriot First Division at Alki Larnaca. He spent most of his career coaching in Divizia B, having a total of 356 games, managing to win four promotions to the first league with Selena Bacău, Baia Mare, Unirea Urziceni and Concordia Chiajna. Orac has a total of 73 matches managed in Divizia A and in 2009 he was Dario Bonetti's assistant at Dinamo București for a few months.

== Personal life ==
His nephew, Daniel Orac, was also a footballer.

== Playing statistics ==
Romania national team
Year	Apps	Goals
1984	1	1
1985	0	0
1986	2	0
Total	3	1

Scores and results list Romania's goal tally first, score column indicates score after each Orac goal.

List of international goals scored by Costel Orac
#	Date	Venue	Opponent	Score	Result	Competition
1.	29 July 1984	Stadionul 23 August, Iași, Romania	China	3–0	4–2	Friendly

== Honours ==
=== Player ===
FCM Galați

- Divizia B: 1978–79

Dinamo București

- Divizia A: 1981–82, 1982–83, 1983–84
- Cupa României: 1981–82, 1983–84, 1985–86

=== Manager ===
Selena Bacău

- Divizia B: 1994–95
