= Dumitru Moraru =

Romanian footballer

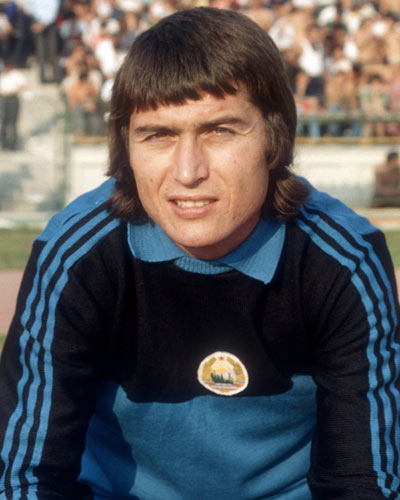

Personal information
- Date of birth: 8 May 1956 (age 70)
- Place of birth: București, Romania
- Height: 1.86 m (6 ft 1 in)
- Position: Goalkeeper

Youth career
- 1966–1972: Metalul București

Senior career*
Years	Team	Apps	(Gls)
1972–1974	Metalul București	56	(0)
1974–1978	Steaua București	84	(0)
1978–1981	Sportul Studențesc București	88	(0)
1981–1989	Dinamo București	212	(0)
1989	Victoria București	5	(0)
1990–1991	IK Start	41	(0)
Total		490	(0)

International career
	Romania U21	6	(0)
	Romania U23	5	(0)
	Romania B	2	(0)
1975–1988	Romania (Note: Including one appearance for Romania's Olympic team.)	39	(0)

Managerial career
- 2018–2023: Romania U-19 (GK coach)
- 2023–: ACS FC Dinamo (GK coach)
- * Club domestic league appearances and goals

Dumitru Moraru (born 8 May 1956) is a Romanian former professional footballer who played as a goalkeeper from 1972 until 1991.

== Club career ==
=== Metalul București ===
Moraru was born on 8 May 1956 in București, Romania, growing up in the Pantelimon neighborhood, where he started playing football in 1966 at the junior teams of Metalul București. There, he earned the nickname "Țețe" (Tsetse) after a teammate told him in a training camp that he sleeps so much as if he had been bitten by a tsetse fly. In 1972 he started playing for Metalul's senior team, making 56 appearances in Divizia B, before joining Steaua București.

=== Steaua București ===
Moraru made his Divizia A debut under coach Constantin Teașcă on 25 August 1974, playing for Steaua in a derby against Dinamo București, which ended with a 2–0 loss, but his performance in the match was appreciated by journalist Eftimie Ionescu who gave him a grade 8 in the Sportul newspaper. He played 24 games in the 1975–76 Divizia A season and 26 in the 1977–78 season, helping The Military Men win the title in each of them and also won the 1975–76 Cupa României, all these achievements being obtained under the guidance of coach Emerich Jenei.

=== Sportul Studențesc București ===
In 1978, Moraru went to play for three seasons at Sportul Studențesc București. He played in both legs of the 3–1 aggregate victory against Rijeka in the 1979–80 Balkans Cup final. Then Moraru was transferred from Sportul Studențesc to Dinamo București in exchange for Andrei Speriatu and Constantin Pană.

=== Dinamo București ===
At Dinamo, Moraru played 31 league games in each of his first three seasons as the club won the title in all of them, working with coach Valentin Stănescu for the first one and with Nicolae Dumitru for the other two. He also won three Cupa României, the first one after a final against FC Baia Mare. The following two were won after finals against rivals Steaua, and in the 1986 final, under coach Mircea Lucescu he managed to keep a clean sheet in the 1–0 win against them, a team that had recently won the European Cup. Moraru made some notable performances with The Red Dogs in European competitions, such as helping the club eliminate Inter Milan in the 1981–82 UEFA Cup. He also appeared in eight matches in the 1983–84 European Cup edition, being the team's captain as the club eliminated title holders Hamburger SV in the campaign, reaching the semi-finals where they were defeated by Liverpool. For the way he played in 1984, Moraru was placed fifth in the ranking for the Romanian Footballer of the Year award.

=== Victoria București ===
After eight seasons spent at Dinamo, Moraru alongside teammates Costel Orac and Alexandru Nicolae were transferred to Victoria București. There, he made his last Divizia A appearance on 5 November 1989 in a 5–0 home win over Inter Sibiu, totaling 393 matches in the competition and 33 games in European competitions.

=== IK Start ===
In 1990, Moraru went to play in Norway for IK Start, making his Tippeligaen debut on 29 April under coach Brede Skistad in a 4–1 away loss to Fyllingen. He played 41 games in the Norwegian league over the course of two seasons, retiring in 1991. Among several Eastern Bloc players who entered Norwegian football after the fall of the Iron Curtain, newspaper Verdens Gang contended that Moraru was the only successful one, whereas the others failed to adapt to Norwegian football.

== International career ==
Moraru played 38 games for Romania, making his debut on 24 September 1975 under coach Valentin Stănescu in a 1–1 draw against Greece in the 1973–76 Balkan Cup. He played one game in each of the 1978 and 1982 World Cup qualifiers. Subsequently, he made three appearances, including two clean sheets in wins over Sweden and World Cup holders Italy during the successful Euro 1984 qualifiers. Moraru played one game under coach Mircea Lucescu in the final tournament in a 1–0 loss to Portugal as Romania did not get past the group stage. He made one appearance during the 1986 World Cup qualifiers which was a 2–0 victory against Finland, then kept another clean sheet in a 4–0 win over Austria in the Euro 1988 qualifiers. Moraru's last game played for the national team took place on 30 March 1988 in a 3–3 friendly draw against East Germany.

== Personal life ==
Moraru's cousin Ștefan Georgescu was a footballer who played for Metalul București.

Sports commentator Ilie Dobre wrote a book about him titled Țețe Moraru - Glorie. Reflexe. Amintiri (Țețe Moraru - Glory. Reflexes. Memories), which was released in 2001.

== Honours ==
Steaua București

- Divizia A: 1975–76, 1977–78
- Cupa României: 1975–76

Sportul Studențesc București

- Balkans Cup: 1979–80

Dinamo București

- Divizia A: 1981–82, 1982–83, 1983–84
- Cupa României: 1981–82, 1983–84, 1985–86

Individual

- Romanian Footballer of the Year (fifth place): 1984
