= 1985–86 Cupa României =

Tournament details
- Country: Romania

Final positions
- Champions: Dinamo București
- Runners-up: Steaua București

The 1985–86 Cupa României was the 48th edition of Romania's most prestigious football cup competition.

The title was won by Dinamo București against Steaua București.

== Format ==
The competition is an annual knockout tournament.

First round proper matches are played on the ground of the lowest ranked team, then from the second round proper the matches are played on a neutral location.

If a match is drawn after 90 minutes, the game goes in extra time, if the scored is still tight after 120 minutes, then the winner will be established at penalty kicks.

From the first edition, the teams from Divizia A entered in competition in sixteen finals, rule which remained till today.

== First round proper ==
Team 1	Score	Team 2
4 December 1985
Minerul Baraolt (Div. B)	0–3	(Div. A) Rapid București
Minerul Băiuţ (Div. C)	1–8	(Div. A) Steaua București
Gloria Bistrița (Div. B)	2–1	(Div. A) Bihor Oradea
Metalul Bocşa (Div. B)	1–0	(Div. A) FCM Brașov
Argeş Piteşti (Div. A)	0–0 (a.e.t.)(6-7 p)	(Div. A) Universitatea Cluj
Progresul Vulcan București (Div. B)	2–0	(Div. A) SC Bacău
Sportul Muncitoresc Caracal (Div. C)	2–3 (a.e.t.)	(Div. A) Petrolul Ploiești
Explorări Câmpulung Moldov. (Div. C)	0–1	(Div. A) Victoria București
Universitatea Craiova (Div. A)	1–0	(Div. A) ASA 1962 Târgu Mureș
Unirea Dinamo Focşani (Div. C)	1–2	(Div. A) Chimia Râmnicu Vâlcea
Oțelul Galați (Div. B)	4–1 (a.e.t.)	(Div. A) Sportul Studenţesc București
Victoria Ineu (Div. D)	0–3	(Div. A) Olt Scornicești
Jiul Petroşani (Div. B)	3–1	(Div. A) Corvinul Hunedoara
Ceahlăul Piatra Neamț (Div. B)	2–0	(Div. A) Gloria Buzău
Șoimii IPA Sibiu (Div. B)	3–0	(Div. A) Politehnica Timișoara
CS Târgovişte (Div. B)	0–2	(Div. A) Dinamo București

== Second round proper ==
Team 1	Score	Team 2
22 February 1986
Dinamo București	3–1	Universitatea Cluj
Chimia Râmnicu Vâlcea	1–1 (a.e.t.)(4-3 p)	Ceahlăul Piatra Neamț
Jiul Petroşani	1–0	Metalul Bocşa
Universitatea Craiova	5–1	Șoimii IPA Sibiu
Progresul Vulcan București	4–3 (a.e.t.)	Olt Scornicești
Gloria Bistrița	1–2	Oțelul Galați
Victoria București	1–0 (a.e.t.)	Petrolul Ploiești
26 February 1986
Steaua București	4–2	Rapid București

== Quarter-finals ==
Team 1	Score	Team 2
14 May 1986
Jiul Petroşani	2–1	Chimia Râmnicu Vâlcea
Dinamo București	2–2 (a.e.t.)(4-2 p)	Universitatea Craiova
Oțelul Galați	0–1	Victoria București
15 May 1986
Steaua București	5–1	Progresul Vulcan București

== Semi-finals ==
Team 1	Score	Team 2
21 June 1986
Victoria București	2–4	Dinamo București
Jiul Petroşani	1–2	Steaua București

== Final ==
25 June 1986
18:00 EET

Dinamo București	1–0	Steaua București
Damaschin 71'	Report

23 August, Bucharest
Attendance: 40,000
Referee: Radu Petrescu (Brașov)

Cupa României 1985–86 winners

6th title
