= 1984 Cupa României final =

- Event: 1983–84 Cupa României
Dinamo București	Steaua București
2	1
- Date: 22 May 1984
- Venue: 23 August, Bucharest
- Referee: Dan Petrescu (Bucharest)
- Attendance: 60,000

The 1984 Cupa României final was the 46th final of Romania's most prestigious football cup competition. It was disputed between Dinamo București and Steaua București, and was won by Dinamo București after a game with 3 goals. It was the fifth cup for Dinamo București.

== Route to the final ==
Dinamo București

Round of 32	Petrolul Moineşti	1–4	Dinamo București
Round of 16	Olt Scornicești	0–2	Dinamo București
Quarter-finals	Dinamo București	4–2	Petrolul Ploiești
Semi-finals	Dinamo București	2–0	Corvinul Hunedoara

Steaua București

Round of 32	Cimentul Medgidia	0–4	Steaua București
Round of 16	Steaua București	1–0 (a.e.t.)	SC Bacău
Quarter-finals	Steaua București	2–0	Argeş Piteşti
Semi-finals	Sportul Studenţesc București	0–2	Steaua București

== Match details ==
22 May 1984
17:00 EET

Dinamo București	2–1	Steaua București
Custov 45'; Orac 53'	Report	Lăcătuș 10'

23 August, Bucharest
Attendance: 60,000
Referee: Dan Petrescu (Bucharest)

GK	1.	(Romania) Dumitru Moraru
DF	2.	(Romania) Mircea Rednic
DF	5.	(Romania) Alexandru Nicolae
DF	6.	(Romania) Ion Marin
DF	3.	(Romania) Nelu Stănescu	(substituted off) 24'
MF	9.	(Romania) Marin Dragnea
MF	8.	(Romania) Ioan Andone
MF	10.	(Romania) Alexandru Custov
FW	7.	(Romania) Cornel Țălnar
FW	4.	(Romania) Ionel Augustin
FW	11.	(Romania) Costel Orac
Substitutes:
DF		(Romania) Ioan Mărginean	(substituted in) 24'
Manager:
(Romania) Dumitru Nicolae Nicușor

GK	1.	(Romania) Helmut Duckadam
DF	2.	(Romania) Nicolae Laurențiu
DF	3.	(Romania) Florin Marin
DF	6.	(Romania) Miodrag Belodedici
DF	4.	(Romania) Augustin Eduard
MF	10.	(Romania) Mihail Majearu
MF	5.	(Romania) Tudorel Stoica
MF	8.	(Romania) Ștefan Petcu	(substituted off) 60'
FW	7.	(Romania) Marius Lăcătuș
FW	9.	(Romania) Victor Pițurcă	(substituted off) 65'
FW	11.	(Romania) Gavril Balint
Substitutes:
MF		(Romania) Ioan Diaconescu	(substituted in) 60'
FW		(Romania) Septimiu Câmpeanu	(substituted in) 65'
Manager:
(Romania) Emerich Jenei

== See also ==
- List of Cupa României finals
- Eternal derby (Romania)
