= Viorel Turcu =

Romanian footballer (1960–2020)

Personal information
- Date of birth: 9 August 1960
- Place of birth: Slobozia, Argeș, Romania
- Date of death: 29 November 2020 (aged 60)
- Place of death: Piatra Neamț, Romania
- Height: 1.81 m (5 ft 11 in)
- Position: Forward

Youth career
- Argeș Pitești

Senior career*
Years	Team	Apps	(Gls)
1977–1982	Argeș Pitești	86	(10)
1983	Steaua București	23	(5)
1984	Dinamo București	11	(2)
1984–1986	Olt Scornicești	60	(13)
1986	Steaua București	5	(0)
1986–1989	Olt Scornicești	66	(12)
1989–1990	UTA Arad		
1991	Nistrul Chișinău	2	(0)
1991–1992	Szarvasi Vasas	3	(0)
1992–1996	Olt Scornicești		
Total		256	(42)

International career
1982	Romania	7	(1)

Managerial career
- 1992–1996: Olt Scornicești (player-coach)
- 1996–1997: Cimentul Fieni
- Fulgerul Bragadiru
- 2009–2011: Argeșul Mihăilești
- * Club domestic league appearances and goals

Viorel Turcu (9 August 1960 – 29 November 2020) was a Romanian footballer who played as a forward.

== Club career ==
Turcu was born on 9 August 1960 in Slobozia, Argeș, Romania and began playing junior-level football at Argeș Pitești. He made his Divizia A debut on 11 June 1978 when coach Florin Halagian sent him in the 60th minute and two minutes later he scored his side's goal after an assist from Nicolae Dobrin in a 2–1 away loss to Bihor Oradea. In the 1978–79 season he helped Argeș win the title, coach Halagian using him in only seven games as he had to compete in the offence with players such as Dobrin, Marin Radu and Doru Nicolae. In the following season they got past AEK Athens in the first round of the 1979–80 European Cup, the team being eliminated in the following one by title holders and eventual winners, Nottingham Forest. He scored his only goal in European competitions in a 4–0 win over APOEL Nicosia in the 1981–82 UEFA Cup season.

In the middle of the 1982–83 season, Turcu left Argeș to play for one year at Steaua București. In the middle of the following season he arrived at Dinamo București, helping the team win The Double at the end of it, scoring two goals in the 11 league matches coach Nicolae Dumitru used him. However, he did play in the 2–1 win in the Cupa României final over his former team, Steaua. He also played with The Red Dogs during their 1983–84 European Cup campaign, in which they eliminated Dinamo Minsk in the quarter-finals before being defeated by Liverpool in the semi-finals. Afterwards, Turcu went for two years to Olt Scornicești, then returned for a second spell at Steaua. After playing only five games in the first half of the 1986–87 season, he returned to Scornicești, but Steaua managed to win The Double without him. Turcu made his last Divizia A appearance on 20 June 1989 in a 2–1 home loss to Victoria București, totaling 252 matches with 42 goals in the competition and 11 games with one goal in European competitions.

In the following years, Turcu played for several clubs, first in Divizia B with UTA Arad. Subsequently, he moved to Nistrul Chișinău for the 1991 Soviet First League season, and then he spent one season at Nemzeti Bajnokság II side Szarvasi Vasas. From 1992 until 1996, he came back for a third spell at Olt Scornicești, where he served as a player-coach in the Romanian lower leagues.

After he ended his playing career, Turcu talked about his achievements, praising former Argeș teammate, Nicolae Dobrin:"I've always said it and I'm happy to say it now. I'm proud to have carried his boots and bag. Nowadays, that doesn't happen anymore, to recognize a player by value. I carried his bag out of respect and never bothered to do so. I am also proud to have played alongside Dobrin but also with Balaci at FC Olt and Hagi at Steaua!"

== International career ==
In 1982, Turcu played in seven friendly matches for Romania, making his debut on 24 March under coach Mircea Lucescu in a 4–1 loss to Belgium. He scored his only goal in a 4–0 victory against Japan, a team against which he also played his last game for the national team, a 3–1 victory.

== Managerial career ==
In 1992, Turcu started coaching at Olt Scornicești, the spell lasting until 1996. He worked only for teams in the Romanian lower leagues such as Cimentul Fieni, Fulgerul Bragadiru or Argeșul Mihăilești.

== Death ==
In his later life, Turcu suffered from diabetes, which necessitated the amputation of his legs. He died on 29 November 2020, at the age of 60, after experiencing a heart attack in his sleep.

== Career statistics ==
Scores and results list Romania's goal tally first. "Score" column indicates the score after each Viorel Turcu goal.

#	Date	Venue	Opponent	Score	Result	Competition
1.	15 July 1982	Stadionul Areni, Suceava, Romania	Japan	2–0	4–0	Friendly

== Honours ==
Argeș Pitești

- Divizia A: 1978–79

Dinamo București

- Divizia A: 1983–84
- Cupa României: 1983–84

Steaua București

- Divizia A: 1986–87
- Cupa României: 1986–87
