= 1989 Cupa României final =

- Event: 1988–89 Cupa României
Steaua București	Dinamo București
Divizia A	Divizia A
1	0
- Date: 29 June 1989
- Venue: Municipal, Brașov
- Referee: Dan Petrescu (Bucharest)
- Attendance: 35,000

The 1989 Cupa României final was the 51st final of Romania's most prestigious football cup competition. It was disputed between Steaua București and Dinamo București, and was won by Steaua București after a game with one goal. It was the 17th cup for Steaua București, but when the club officially renounced in 1990 at the trophy won in 1988, it became the 16th cup.

== Route to the final ==
Steaua București

Round of 32	Pandurii Târgu Jiu	0–3	Steaua București
Round of 16	FCM Brașov	3–6	Steaua București
Quarter-finals	Steaua București	3–1	Unirea Slobozia
Semi-finals	Steaua București	3–2	Rapid București

Dinamo București

Round of 32	Progresul Medgidia	1–2	Dinamo București
Round of 16	Inter Sibiu	0–1	Dinamo București
Quarter-finals	Dinamo București	5–1	SC Bacău
Semi-finals	Dinamo București	2–0	Victoria București

== Match details ==
29 June 1989
17:00 EET

Steaua București	1–0	Dinamo București
Hagi 67'	Report

Stadionul Municipal, Brașov
Attendance: 35,000
Referee: Dan Petrescu (Bucharest)

GK	1	(Romania) Silviu Lung
DF	2	(Romania) Dan Petrescu
DF	6	(Romania) Ștefan Iovan
DF	4	(Romania) Adrian Bumbescu
DF	11	(Romania) Iosif Rotariu
MF	5	(Romania) Tudorel Stoica (c)
MF	3	(Romania) Daniel Minea (substituted off) 84'
MF	8	(Romania) Ilie Dumitrescu
MF	10	(Romania) Gheorghe Hagi
FW	7	(Romania) Marius Lăcătuș (substituted off) 85'
FW	9	(Romania) Victor Pițurcă
Substitutions:
MF	12	(Romania) Ilie Stan (substituted in) 84'
FW	14	(Romania) Gabi Balint (substituted in) 85'
Manager:
(Romania) Anghel Iordănescu

GK	1	(Romania) Bogdan Stelea
DF	2	(Romania) Ioan Varga
DF	6	(Romania) Ioan Andone (c)
DF	4	(Romania) Mircea Rednic
DF	3	(Romania) Michael Klein
MF	10	(Romania) Dorin Mateuț
MF	5	(Romania) Ioan Lupescu (substituted off) 46'
MF	11	(Romania) Dănuț Lupu
MF	8	(Romania) Iulian Mihăescu
FW	7	(Romania) Claudiu Vaișcovici
FW	9	(Romania) Rodion Cămătaru (substituted off) 78'
Substitutions:
DF	12	(Romania) Costel Orac (substituted in) 46'
FW	13	(Romania) Florin Răducioiu (substituted in) 78'
Manager:
(Romania) Mircea Lucescu

MATCH OFFICIALS

- Assistant referees:
  - (Romania) Adrian Porumboiu
  - (Romania) Gheorghe Constantin

== See also ==
- List of Cupa României finals
- Eternal derby (Romania)
