= Anghel Iordănescu =

Romanian footballer and manager

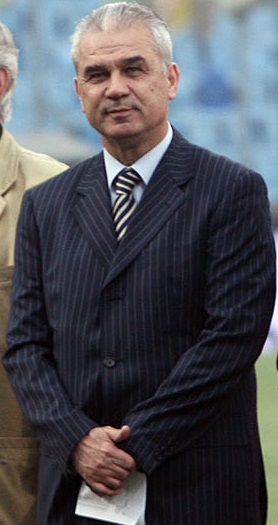
- Iordănescu in 2008

Personal information
- Date of birth: 4 May 1950 (age 76)
- Place of birth: Bucharest, Romania
- Height: 1.76 m (5 ft 9 in)
- Position: Forward

Youth career
- 1960–1968: Steaua București

Senior career*
Years	Team	Apps	(Gls)
1968–1982	Steaua București	317	(156)
1982–1984	OFI	54	(7)
1986	Steaua București	0	(0)
Total		371	(163)

International career
1971–1981	Romania	57	(21)

Managerial career
- 1984: Steaua București (juniors)
- 1984–1986: Steaua București (assistant)
- 1986–1990: Steaua București
- 1990–1992: Anorthosis Famagusta
- 1992–1993: Steaua București
- 1993–1998: Romania
- 1998–1999: Greece
- 1999–2000: Al-Hilal
- 2000: Rapid București
- 2001–2002: Al Ain
- 2002–2004: Romania
- 2005–2006: Al-Ittihad
- 2006: Al Ain
- 2014–2016: Romania
Member of the Senate of Romania
In office 6 February 2008 – 2012
Constituency	Ilfov County
- * Club domestic league appearances and goals

Anghel Iordănescu (Romanian pronunciation: [ˈaŋɡel jordəˈnesku]; born 4 May 1950) is a Romanian former football player and manager, who played as a forward.

Iordănescu, nicknamed Puiu, spent most of his playing career at Steaua București, winning two Romanian League titles and several Cupa României trophies. He also had a two-season spell at Greek side OFI. During his time as an assistant coach at Steaua, he came out of retirement and played in the victory against Barcelona in the 1986 European Cup final. He also represented Romania in 54 matches at international level, scoring 21 goals.

As a coach, Iordănescu won four Romanian League championships, two Cupa României trophies and the 1986 European Super Cup with Steaua, while also reaching the 1987–88 European Cup semifinals and the final in the 1988–89 edition. He led Romania's national team in the 1994 World Cup, Euro 1996, the 1998 World Cup and Euro 2016 final tournaments. The team reached the quarter-finals in the 1994 World Cup. He also had a spell from 1998 to 1999 with the Greece national team. Furthermore, Iordănescu found success in the Arab world, notably winning the AFC Champions League in 2000 and 2005 with Al-Hilal and Al-Ittihad respectively.

== Club career ==
"The Romanian player who impressed me as a child was Iordănescu, a creative player, and left-footed too. Later, he was my coach at Steaua and then in the national side – an indescribable feeling for me."

— Gheorghe Hagi

Iordănescu was born on 4 May 1950 in Bucharest, Romania, growing up in the Giulești neighborhood. As a child, he was a fan of Steaua București, a team for which he began playing junior-level football in 1960 at the age of 10.

Iordănescu made his Divizia A debut at age 18 under coach Ștefan Kovács on 17 November 1968 in a 2–1 home loss to Politehnica Iași. The team won the 1968–69 Cupa României at the end of his first season, but he did not play in the final. He helped the club win the 1975–76 and 1977–78 championship titles under coach Emerich Jenei, being the team's top-scorer on both occasions with 23 and 19 goals respectively. Iordănescu also helped them win four more Cupa României trophies, playing in all the finals, scoring the only goal of the 1–0 victory against CSU Galați in the 1976 final. During his time with The Military Men, he also played 19 games and scored one goal in European competitions. He took part in the 1971–72 European Cup Winners' Cup campaign, playing all six games as the team reached the quarter-finals by eliminating Hibernians and Barcelona, being eliminated after 1–1 on aggregate on the away goal rule by Bayern Munich. For the way he played in 1976, Iordănescu was placed third in the ranking for the Romanian Footballer of the Year award, and in 1980, he was runner-up behind teammate Marcel Răducanu. In the 1981–82 season, he was the top-scorer of the league with 20 goals netted. Iordănescu's last Divizia A appearance occurred on 12 June 1982 in Steaua's 2–1 home win against FC Constanța, totaling 317 games with 156 goals in the competition. Among these goals, five were scored in the derby against Dinamo București, contributing to two victories, two draws, and one loss for his side, while also netting another goal in a 4–1 win in the Cupa României.

In 1982, aged 32, Iordănescu left Romania to play for OFI in Greece under head coach Les Shannon. He was recommended there by his friend, businessman Yiorgos Vardinogiannis. He made 54 Alpha Ethniki appearances and scored seven goals across two seasons in which the team finished mid-table. Notably, he provided three assists in a 4–0 win over AEK Athens.

Iordănescu returned to Romania to rejoin Steaua in 1984 and became Emerich Jenei's assistant. He came out of retirement for one match, the 1986 European Cup final against Barcelona. Jenei sent him in the 72nd minute to replace Lucian Bălan, and his performance was highly regarded as they won 2–0 after the penalty shoot-out.

== International career ==
Iordănescu made a total of 57 appearances for Romania, serving as captain in nine of them and scoring 21 goals. He made his debut under coach Angelo Niculescu on 22 September 1971 and opened the scoring in a 4–0 away victory against Finland during the 1972 Euro qualifiers. In those qualifiers, he played in another two victories against Czechoslovakia and Wales, but also in two draws in the quarter-finals against Hungary, who advanced to the final tournament. Subsequently, he played five matches in the 1974 World Cup qualifiers and scored a double in a 3–1 victory against Greece during the 1973–76 Balkan Cup.

Iordănescu made four appearances during the Euro 1976 qualifiers, scoring once in a 2–2 draw against Spain, before playing four additional matches in the Euro 1980 qualifiers where he scored a goal in both the win and the loss against Yugoslavia. He helped Romania win the 1977–80 Balkan Cup by being the top-scorer of the tournament with six goals, of which one was scored in a win against Turkey, two were in two matches against Bulgaria, a victory and a draw respectively, and a hat-trick in the second leg of the final to defeat Yugoslavia 4–3 on aggregate. Iordănescu played six matches in the 1982 World Cup qualifiers, netting one goal in a 1–1 draw against Norway and the decisive goal in the 2–1 win over England.

== Managerial career ==
=== Steaua București and Anorthosis Famagusta ===
In 1984, Iordănescu became a junior coach at Steaua București. However, he soon became an assistant for the senior squad after Florin Halagian was replaced by Emerich Jenei. During his time with Jenei, they won the 1984–85 and 1985–86 Divizia A titles, the 1984–85 Cupa României and the 1985–86 European Cup. After Jenei was appointed as Romania's manager in 1986, Iordănescu became Steaua's new head coach. From this new position, his first achievement was winning the 1986 European Super Cup, after a 1–0 victory against Dynamo Kyiv, courtesy of a goal scored by Gheorghe Hagi. He also led them in the 1–0 loss to River Plate in the 1986 Intercontinental Cup. Subsequently, during the 1987–88 European Cup, Steaua eliminated MTK Budapest, Omonia Nicosia and Rangers to reach the semi-finals where they were defeated 2–0 on aggregate by Benfica. In the 1988–89 European Cup campaign, they got past Sparta Prague, Spartak Moscow, IFK Göteborg and Galatasaray, reaching the final where they lost 4–0 to Arrigo Sacchi's AC Milan. Domestically, Iordănescu helped the team win three consecutive Divizia A titles while remaining undefeated in the 1986–87, 1987–88 and 1988–89 seasons. Steaua had 104 consecutive league matches without suffering a loss. Under his leadership, they also won the 1986–87 and 1988–89 Cupa României trophies, both after 1–0 victories in the finals against rivals Dinamo București, thanks to goals netted by László Bölöni and Hagi respectively.

In the summer of 1990, Iordănescu went to Cypriot club Anorthosis Famagusta. During his tenure, Anorthosis was eliminated by his former team, Steaua, in the first round of the 1991–92 UEFA Cup. Domestically, Anorthosis finished in second place in both seasons under his guidance.

Iordănescu returned to Steaua in 1992, managing to win a league title at the end of the 1992–93 season. He also led the club to the 1992–93 Cup Winners' Cup quarter-finals, after eliminating Bohemians and Aarhus, being defeated after 1–1 on aggregate on the away goal rule by Royal Antwerp.

=== Romania and Greece ===
In the summer of 1993, Iordănescu was appointed to replace Cornel Dinu as Romania's coach. His first match was a 4–0 win over Faroe Islands in the 1994 World Cup qualifiers with all the goals being netted by Florin Răducioiu. The team also managed two victories against Belgium and Wales. The 2–1 win against Wales earned them the mathematical qualification to the final tournament and the match is considered by Romanian journalists as the birth of Romania's "Golden Generation". In the group stage of the final tournament, Romania defeated Colombia and hosts USA, losing to Switzerland. Thus, they reached the round of 16, where they defeated Argentina with a spectacular 3–2 score in which Ilie Dumitrescu netted a brace and Gheorghe Hagi scored one goal. In the quarter-finals, Romania faced Sweden, and after the score remained 2–2 following extra time, the match reached a penalty shoot-out where Dan Petrescu and Miodrag Belodedici missed their spot kick, while all but one of the Swedes scored, resulting in the end of their campaign.

In the Euro 1996 qualifiers, Iordănescu guided them to the first place in their group, above France, Slovakia, Poland, Israel and Azerbaijan. However, in the final tournament Romania lost all three group stage games to France, Bulgaria and Spain.

In the 1998 World Cup qualifiers, Iordănescu led The Tricolours to the first place in their group after nine wins, one draw and no losses against Republic of Ireland, Lithuania, Macedonia, Iceland and Liechtenstein. Subsequently, they earned victories over Colombia and England in the first two group stage matches during the final tournament, thus mathematically qualifying before the last group match against Tunisia. In order to celebrate, the players dyed their hair blonde and presented themselves like that at the game, while Iordănescu shaved his head bald. They were defeated with 1–0 by Croatia in the round of 16 after a goal scored from a penalty by Davor Šuker.

In the summer of 1998, after the World Cup, Iordănescu took over as manager of Greece with the objective of qualifying them to Euro 2000. His first match was the team's debut in the Euro 2000 qualifiers, a 2–2 draw against Slovenia. He continued with a win over Georgia and a draw against Albania. Subsequently, he helped them win the 1999 Cyprus International Football Tournament after defeating Finland and Belgium. In March 1999, Greece defeated Croatia in a friendly, but lost 2–0 to Norway in the Euro qualifiers and Iordănescu resigned.

=== Al-Hilal, Rapid București and Al Ain ===
In 1999, Iordănescu was appointed head coach of Saudi club Al-Hilal. His first performance was finishing runner-up in the 17th GCC Club Championship, behind Qadsia SC. He won the first trophy with them on 16 February 2000, after defeating Al-Ahli 2–1 in the Saudi Founder's Cup. The most important trophy won by Iordănescu during this spell was the 1999–2000 Asian Club Championship on 22 April, after Al-Hilal's 3–2 victory against Júbilo Iwata in the final, courtesy of a hat-trick scored by Sérgio Ricardo. Subsequently, he led them to win the Saudi Crown Prince Cup on 12 May, by defeating Al Shabab with 3–0 in the final.

Despite these performances, he left Al-Hilal to coach Rapid București. Iordănescu led Rapid to the first round of the 2000–01 UEFA Cup, losing 1–0 on aggregate to eventual winners Liverpool. He was sacked after only three months on 21 October 2000 due to poor results, with his last match being a 1–1 draw against Ceahlăul Piatra Neamț. Years later, he said he regretted this spell: "If I made a mistake in my sports career, it was that I agreed to go to Rapid. I think the mistake was that I went there when all my activity was related to Steaua and the national team. I don't think I should have gone there." Iordănescu has a total of 169 matches as a manager in the Romanian top-division, Divizia A, consisting of 130 victories, 30 draws and nine losses.

Afterwards, Iordănescu signed with Emirati club Al Ain. He guided them to win the 2000–01 UAE President's Cup after defeating Al-Shaab in the final.

=== Second spell at Romania ===
After Romania failed to qualify for the 2002 World Cup, Iordănescu was asked to replace Gheorghe Hagi, thereby becoming the national football team's coach for the second time. His main objective was to qualify the team for Euro 2004, but he failed to do so as they finished third in their qualification group. On 30 April 2004, Romania managed a 5–1 victory against Germany in a friendly. They started the 2006 World Cup qualifiers well, with three victories over Finland, Macedonia and Andorra, but after a 1–0 loss to Czech Republic and a 1–1 draw against Armenia, Iordănescu was dismissed.

=== Al-Ittihad and Al Ain ===
In March 2005, Iordănescu returned to Saudi Arabia to manage Al-Ittihad. His first trophy won was the 2004–05 Arab Champions League after defeating Sfaxien in the final by a score of 4–1 on aggregate. Subsequently, they won the 2005 AFC Champions League after a 5–3 aggregate win over Al Ain in the final. Al-Ittihad participated in the 2005 FIFA Club World Championship where after a strong performance by Mohamed Kallon and a goal scored by Mohammed Noor, they defeated 1–0 Egyptian side Al Ahly in the quarter-finals, a team that had a 55-match unbeaten run. However, they were defeated by São Paulo in the semi-finals, also losing to Saprissa in the match for the third place. Iordănescu was dismissed in March 2006, following a draw against Al-Ettifaq in the domestic league.

Just as the 2006–07 UAE Football League began, Iordănescu returned to coach Al Ain for a few months before announcing his retirement from professional football.

=== Third spell at Romania ===
On 16 December 2013, Iordănescu became the technical director of Romania's national team. Subsequently, in October 2014, he was appointed as the team's head coach, after Victor Pițurcă left to coach Al-Ittihad. Iordănescu earned qualification to Euro 2016 by finishing the qualifiers in second place with one point less than Northern Ireland but above Hungary, Finland, Faroe Islands and Greece. In the final tournament, Romania lost 2–1 to hosts France, drew 1–1 against Switzerland and suffered another loss, 1–0 to Albania, finishing its group in last place. Iordănescu resigned shortly afterwards. He has a total of 101 games from his three spells at the national team, consisting of 55 victories, 24 draws and 22 losses.

== Political career ==
In 2004, Iordănescu became a member of the Social Democratic Party. On 6 February 2008, he assumed office in the Romanian Senate. In January 2009, Iordănescu opted to serve as an independent senator, and in October the same year he joined the National Union for the Progress of Romania. During the 2012 Romanian local elections, he ran for Mayor of Bucharest, but earned only 1.5% of the votes.

== Personal life ==
Iordănescu is married to Valeria with whom he has four children: Edward, Andrei, Alexandru and Maria. His eldest son, Edward, was also a footballer, and a former head coach of the Romania national team.

In 1994, Iordănescu was named Honorary Citizen of Bucharest. The Romanian Football Federation named him "the coach of the century" in 1999. On 25 March 2008, Iordănescu was decorated by the President of Romania, Traian Băsescu, for winning the 1985–86 European Cup with the Ordinul "Meritul Sportiv" — (The Order "The Sportive Merit") class II. Subsequently, on 12 December 2014, President Băsescu awarded him with the Order of the Star of Romania - in the rank of Knight with military insignia. The Anghel Iordănescu Stadium in Voluntari is named in his honor.

== Career statistics ==
Appearances and goals by national team and year
National team	Year	Apps	Goals
Romania	1971	3	1
Romania	1972	6	1
Romania	1973	2	0
Romania	1974	7	2
Romania	1975	7	2
Romania	1976	4	0
Romania	1977	7	4
Romania	1978	9	4
Romania	1979	1	0
Romania	1980	4	6
Romania	1981	7	1
Total		57	21

Scores and results table. "Score" indicates the score after the player's goal:

International goals
Goal	Date	Venue	Opponent	Score	Result	Competition
1	22 September 1971	Helsinki Olympic Stadium, Helsinki, Finland	Finland	1–0	4–0	UEFA Euro 1972 Qual.
2	8 April 1972	Stadionul 23 August, Bucharest, Romania	France	1–0	2–0	Friendly
3	29 May 1974	Stadionul 23 August, Bucharest, Romania	Greece	1–1	3–1	1973–76 Balkan Cup
4	29 May 1974	Stadionul 23 August, Bucharest, Romania	Greece	3–1	3–1	1973–76 Balkan Cup
5	12 October 1975	Stadionul Republicii, Bucharest, Romania	Turkey	1–1	2–2	Friendly
6	16 November 1975	Stadionul 23 August, Bucharest, Romania	Spain	2–2	2–2	UEFA Euro 1976 Qual.
7	23 March 1977	Stadionul Steaua, Bucharest, Romania	Turkey	4–0	4–0	1977–80 Balkan Cup
8	8 May 1977	Stadion Maksimir, Zagreb, SFR Yugoslavia	Yugoslavia	2–0	2–0	1978 FIFA World Cup Qual.
9	14 August 1977	Stade de F.U.S., Rabat, Morocco	Czechoslovakia	3–1	3–1	Friendly
10	13 November 1977	Stadionul 23 August, Bucharest, Romania	Yugoslavia	2–2	4–6	1978 FIFA World Cup Qual.
11	5 May 1978	Stadionul 23 August, Bucharest, Romania	Bulgaria	1–0	2–0	1977–80 Balkan Cup
12	31 May 1978	Vasil Levski National Stadium, Sofia, Bulgaria	Bulgaria	1–1	1–1	1977–80 Balkan Cup
13	11 October 1978	Stadionul Steaua, Bucharest, Romania	Poland	1–0	1–0	Friendly
14	25 October 1978	Stadionul Steaua, Bucharest, Romania	Yugoslavia	3–1	3–2	UEFA Euro 1980 Qual.
15	27 August 1980	Stadionul 23 August, Bucharest, Romania	Yugoslavia	1–0	4–1	1977–80 Balkan Cup
16	27 August 1980	Stadionul 23 August, Bucharest, Romania	Yugoslavia	3–0	4–1	1977–80 Balkan Cup
17	27 August 1980	Stadionul 23 August, Bucharest, Romania	Yugoslavia	4–1	4–1	1977–80 Balkan Cup
18	10 September 1980	Yuri Gagarin Stadium, Varna, Bulgaria	Bulgaria	2–1	2–1	Friendly
19	24 September 1980	Ullevaal Stadion, Oslo, Norway	Norway	1–1	1–1	1982 FIFA World Cup Qual.
20	15 October 1980	Stadionul 23 August, Bucharest, Romania	England	2–1	2–1	1982 FIFA World Cup Qual.
21	25 March 1981	Stadionul 23 August, Bucharest, Romania	Poland	2–0	2–0	Friendly

== Honours ==
=== Player ===
Steaua București

- Divizia A: 1975–76, 1977–78
- Cupa României: 1968–69, 1969–70, 1970–71, 1975–76, 1978–79
- European Cup: 1985–86

Romania

- Balkan Cup: 1977–80

Individual

- Gazeta Sporturilor Romanian Footballer of the Year runner-up: 1980, (third place): 1976
- Divizia A top scorer: 1981–82

=== Manager ===
Steaua București

- Divizia A: 1986–87, 1987–88, 1988–89, 1992–93
- Cupa României: 1986–87, 1988–89
- European Cup runner-up: 1988–89
- European Super Cup: 1986
- Intercontinental Cup runner-up: 1986

Greece

- Cyprus International Football Tournament: 1999

Al Hilal

- Asian Club Championship: 1999–00
- Saudi Crown Prince Cup: 2000
- Saudi Founder's Cup: 1999–00
- Gulf Club Champions Cup runner-up: 2000

Al Ain

- UAE President's Cup: 2000–01

Al Ittihad

- AFC Champions League: 2005
- UAFA Arab Champions League: 2004–05

== See also ==
- List of Asian Cup and AFC Champions League winning managers
- National team managers with 100 or more matches
- List of UEFA Super Cup winning managers
