= Miodrag Belodedici =

Romanian footballer

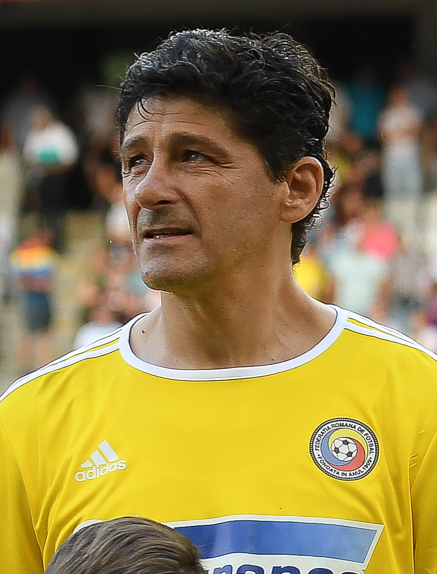
- Belodedici in 2018

Personal information
- Date of birth: 20 May 1964 (age 62)
- Place of birth: Socol, Romania
- Height: 1.85 m (6 ft 1 in)
- Position: Sweeper

Youth career
- 1978–1981: Minerul Moldova Nouă
- 1981–1982: Luceafărul București

Senior career*
Years	Team	Apps	(Gls)
1982–1988	Steaua București	174	(18)
1989–1992	Red Star Belgrade (Note: According to Red Star Belgrade's official website, he played 24 matches in the 1991–92 Yugoslav First League season and not 15, as other sources claim.)	72	(3)
1992–1994	Valencia	49	(0)
1994–1995	Valladolid	31	(0)
1995–1996	Villarreal	16	(2)
1996–1998	Atlante	63	(2)
1998–2001	Steaua București	61	(3)
2012–2014	GVD București		
Total		466	(28)

International career
1981	Romania U18	1	(0)
1983–1985	Romania U21	17	(1)
1987	Romania Olympic	3	(0)
1984–2000	Romania	55	(5)
- * Club domestic league appearances and goals

Miodrag Belodedici (Romanian pronunciation: [beloˈdedit͡ʃʲ]; Serbian: Миодраг Белодедић, romanized: Miodrag Belodedić; born 20 May 1964) is a Romanian former professional footballer who played as a sweeper.

Nicknamed The Deer due to his elegant tackles, he spent the majority of his 19-year professional career with Steaua București (ten seasons), winning the European Cup with that team and Red Star Belgrade, thus becoming the first player (to play in the final) to win the trophy with two clubs and the only player to win the trophy with two different Eastern European teams. Belodedici also played in Spain and Mexico.

Belodedici won 55 caps with Romania, representing the nation in the 1994 World Cup and two European Championships.

== Club career ==
=== Early career ===
Belodedici was born on 20 May 1964 in a family of Serbian ethnicity in the village of Socol, Romania, near the border with Yugoslavia. He spoke only Serbian until elementary school, and completed his first four grades in that language. In the fifth he began learning Romanian. He grew up as a fan of Red Star Belgrade and Steaua București, with his idol being Ștefan Sameș.

Belodedici joined the youth squad of Minerul Moldova Nouă in 1978, at the age of 14, his first coach being Olimpiu Mateescu. Three years later he moved to Luceafărul București, a team created by the Romanian Football Federation for the purpose of gathering all talented young players in the country in one squad. There, he was coached by Costică Toma and developed a close friendship with Gavril Balint and Gheorghe Hagi.

=== Steaua București ===
In the summer of 1982, Belodedici was signed by Steaua București, having been selected by the club's chairman Ion Alecsandrescu. He made his Divizia A debut on 5 March 1983 under coach Constantin Cernăianu in a 1–0 home victory against Politehnica Iași. He finished his first season with 17 league appearances, playing alongside his childhood idol Ștefan Sameș. The team won The Double in the 1984–85 season, with Belodedici playing 25 matches and scoring three goals under coaches Florin Halagian and Emerich Jenei. He also played the entire match in the 2–1 victory in the Cupa României final over Universitatea Craiova. In the following season, he won the league title, scoring two goals in the 32 appearances given to him by Jenei. The coach also used him in all nine games in the historical European Cup campaign. In the final, he played the entire match, including extra time, in the eventual 2–0 victory after the penalty shoot-out against Barcelona. After the game, he was praised by the Spanish press:"A defender so good that even if he had played for two days and two nights, he would have continued to run and always be exactly where he needed to be." Belodedici started the 1986–87 season by playing all the minutes in the 1–0 win over Dynamo Kyiv in the European Super Cup and in the loss in the Intercontinental Cup with the same score against River Plate. He finished the season by winning another Double with Steaua, as coaches Jenei and Anghel Iordănescu gave him 32 league appearances in which he scored five goals. He also appeared the full 90 minutes in the 1–0 victory in the Cupa României final over Dinamo București. In the next season, Belodedici was used by Iordănescu in 31 league games in which he scored three goals, as The Military Men won another title. He made another continental performance with the team as they reached the semi-finals of the European Cup where they lost to Benfica, Belodedici playing eight matches in the campaign. In the first half of the 1988–89 season, Iordănescu gave him 15 appearances in which he scored once. Afterwards he defected from the country, but Steaua still managed to win The Double and reach the European Cup final without him. During these years, Belodedici was placed three times among the top three in the Romanian Footballer of the Year ranking, finishing second in 1987.

=== Red Star Belgrade ===
In 1988, when Nicolae Ceaușescu was still in power, Belodedici defected from his home country to the neighboring Socialist Federal Republic of Yugoslavia. A friend tried to persuade him to sign for Partizan, but the player insisted that he would only play for Red Star Belgrade. Once he arrived in Belgrade, after a Red Star – Partizan derby, he contacted Dragan Džajić, the president of Red Star. Džajić was initially surprised, but eventually agreed to sign him. However, during his first year, Belodedici played only in friendly matches, which included a 4–1 win over his former team Steaua, as UEFA suspended him for one year. The Ceaușescu regime found him guilty of treason and sentenced him to 10 years of prison in absentia, but after the 1989 Romanian Revolution, all the charges were dropped.

In 1989, Belodedici was given the green light to play for Red Star and, soon after, became a permanent fixture on the squad. In the 1989–90 season, he played 14 league matches and scored one goal under coach Dragoslav Šekularac as the team won The Double. He also played the entire match in the 1–0 win over Hajduk Split in the Yugoslav Cup final. In the following season, Belodedici won the league title, playing 34 matches and scoring once under coach Ljupko Petrović. He also played in all nine games in the historical European Cup campaign. In the final, he played the entire match, including extra time, in the 5–3 victory after the penalty shoot-out against Marseille in which Belodedici netted his spot kick. Thus, he became the first player to conquer the tournament with two different clubs while playing in both finals. Belodedici started the 1991–92 season by playing all the minutes in the 1–0 loss to Manchester United in the European Super Cup and in the 3–0 win over Colo-Colo in the Intercontinental Cup. He finished the season by winning another title, as coach Vladica Popović gave him 24 appearances in which he scored once. In 1991 he was nominated for the Ballon d'Or and finished in the 8th place.

=== Spain and Mexico ===
Belodedici signed with Valencia, making his La Liga debut on 5 September 1992 under coach Guus Hiddink in a 1–0 victory against Rayo Vallecano. Two years later, he joined Valladolid for the 1994–95 season, totaling 80 appearances in the Spanish top-league. Subsequently, he spent his last season in Spain with Villarreal in Segunda División.

In 1996, Belodedici moved to Mexico and spent two years playing for Atlante. His Primera División de México debut took place on 17 August 1996 under coach Miguel Mejía Barón in a 2–1 away loss to Necaxa. He scored his first goal in the competition on 25 August in a 1–1 draw against Atlas. During his second season with Atlante, he was teammates with compatriot Ilie Dumitrescu.

=== Return to Steaua București ===
In 1998, aged 34, Belodedici returned to Steaua. Under coach Jenei, he helped them win the 1998–99 Cupa României by scoring in the 90th minute for a 2–2 draw against Rapid București in the final, leading to extra time and an eventual penalty shoot-out victory. Subsequently, he helped the team win the 2000–01 title, by playing 14 matches and scoring once under coach Victor Pițurcă. Belodedici made his last Divizia A appearance on 7 April 2001 in a 1–1 draw against Rocar București, having a total of 235 games with 21 goals in the competition, also totaling 55 matches with one goal in European competitions.

=== GVD București ===
In 2012, Belodedici returned to the field, playing in the Romanian fourth league for GVD București. The team was composed mostly of former professional football players, including Tom Cristea, Daniel Iftodi, Bogdan Andone, Silvian Dobre, and Costel Mozacu. In 2014, 50-year-old Belodedici had an offer to play for Argeș 1953 Pitești, but the move fell through as GVD asked for a transfer fee.

== International career ==
=== Early years ===
Between 1981 and 1987, Belodedici made several appearances for Romania's under-18, under-21 and Olympic teams.

Belodedici played 55 matches and scored five goals for Romania, making his debut on 31 July 1984 – aged 20 – under coach Mircea Lucescu in a 1–0 friendly win over China. He played six matches and scored one goal in a 5–1 victory against Albania in the Euro 1988 qualifiers. Subsequently, he played two matches during the successful 1990 World Cup qualifiers. However, he missed the final tournament due to his defection to Yugoslavia.

=== 1994 World Cup ===
Belodedici made eight appearances during the 1994 World Cup qualifiers. In the final tournament group stage, Romania's "Golden Generation" earned victories over Colombia and the United States, then defeated Argentina 3–2 in the round of 16. Subsequently, they were eliminated by Sweden after the penalty shoot-out in the quarter-finals, with Belodedici missing the last spot kick. He played as a starter in all five games under coach Anghel Iordănescu.

On 11 July 1994, Belodedici was named Honorary Citizen of Bucharest for "representing Romania brilliantly at the 1994 World Cup in the United States of America".

=== Euro 1996 and Euro 2000 ===
Belodedici played seven games, scoring the opening goal in the 3–0 win over Azerbaijan during the Euro 1996 qualifiers. In the final tournament, Iordănescu used him in both 1–0 losses to France and Bulgaria. The team also lost the game against Spain and left the competition without earning a single point in the group stage.

He was selected by coach Emerich Jenei for the Euro 2000 final tournament. There, Belodedici played in the last group stage game, when he replaced injured captain Gheorghe Popescu in the 30th minute of the 3–2 victory against England. Subsequently, he played the entire match in the 2–0 loss to Italy in the quarter-finals.

=== Final years ===
Belodedici's last two games were during the 2002 World Cup qualifiers, the final one being a 3–0 loss to Italy which took place on 7 October 2000.

In 2022, the International Federation of Football History & Statistics (IFFHS) included Belodedici in its "Romania's all-time dream team" first XI.

== Style of play ==
Belodedici was nicknamed "Căprioara" (The Deer) due to his elegant tackles and for not receiving a red card in his entire career. Emerich Jenei, his coach from Steaua București, described his style of play: "With him in defense, we had no fear. He was so calm and so well placed in every phase that it was difficult for the opponents to catch us off guard. An impressive player, who calmly solved every phase." His former Red Star Belgrade teammate, Robert Prosinečki, said about him: "Belodedici turned the job of defender into an art! I haven't seen anyone do this except him."

== After retirement ==
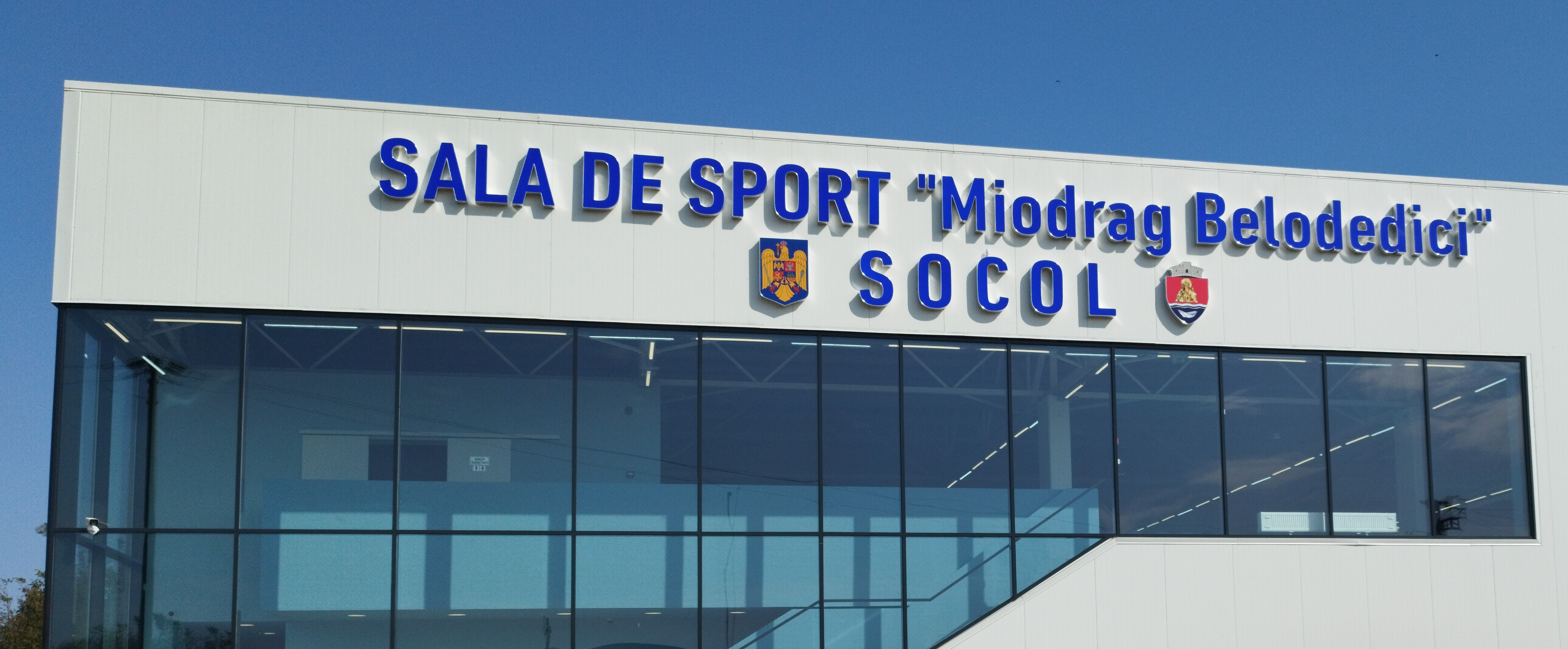
Sports hall named after Miodrag Belodedici in Socol

After ending his playing career, Belodedici spent several years coordinating national youth teams for the Romanian Football Federation.

On 25 March 2008 he was decorated by the president of Romania, Traian Băsescu with Ordinul "Meritul Sportiv" — (The Order "The Sportive Merit") class II for his part in winning the 1985–86 European Cup. A book about him was written by Robert Popa, titled Belodedici. Românul care a triumfat de două ori în Cupa Campionilor Europeni (Belodedici. The Romanian who triumphed twice in the European Champions Cup), which was published in 2020. A sports hall named after him was inaugurated in 2023 in his native Socol.

== Career statistics ==
Appearances and goals by national team and year
National team	Year	Apps	Goals
Romania	1984	1	0
Romania	1985	0	0
Romania	1986	5	0
Romania	1987	8	3
Romania	1988	5	1
Romania	1992	5	0
Romania	1993	4	0
Romania	1994	14	1
Romania	1995	3	0
Romania	1996	4	0
Romania	2000	6	0
Total		55	5

Scores and results list Romania's goal tally first, score column indicates score after each Belodedici goal.

List of international goals scored by Miodrag Belodedici
No.	Date	Venue	Opponent	Score	Result	Competition
1	4 March 1987	Ankara 19 Mayıs, Ankara, Turkey	Turkey	1–0	3–1	Friendly
2	25 March 1987	Stadionul Steaua, Bucharest, Romania	Albania	4–1	5–1	Euro 1988 qualifying
3	8 April 1987	Stadionul Municipal, Brașov, Romania	Israel	2–1	3–2	Friendly
4	20 September 1988	1 Mai, Constanța, Romania	Albania	1–0	3–0	Friendly
5	6 September 1994	Stadionul Steaua, Bucharest, Romania	Azerbaijan	1–0	3–0	Euro 1996 qualifying

== Honours ==
Steaua București

- Divizia A: 1984–85, 1985–86, 1986–87, 1987–88, 1988–89, 2000–01
- Cupa României: 1984–85, 1986–87, 1987–88, 1988–89, 1998–99
- European Cup: 1985–86
- European Super Cup: 1986
- Intercontinental Cup runner-up: 1986

Red Star Belgrade

- Yugoslav First League: 1989–90, 1990–91, 1991–92
- Yugoslav Cup: 1989–90
- European Cup: 1990–91
- European Super Cup runner-up: 1991
- Intercontinental Cup: 1991

Individual

- Gazeta Sporturilor Romanian Footballer of the Year runner-up: 1987; third place: 1986, 1988
- Ballon d'Or: 1991 (8th place)
