= 1985 Cupa României final =

- Event: 1984–85 Cupa României
Steaua București	Universitatea Craiova
Divizia A	Divizia A
2	1
- Date: 23 June 1985
- Venue: Stadionul Naţional, Bucharest
- Referee: Dan Petrescu (Bucharest)
- Attendance: 60,000

The 1985 Cupa României final was the 47th final of Romania's most prestigious football cup competition. It was disputed between Steaua București and Universitatea Craiova, and was won by Steaua București after a game with 3 goals. It was the 14th cup for Steaua București.

== Route to the final ==
Steaua București

Round of 32	Steaua CFR Cuj	1–6	Steaua București
Round of 16	Dunărea CSU Galați	0–2	Steaua București
Quarter-finals	Steaua București	1–0	FC Baia Mare
Semi-finals	Steaua București	5–0	Dinamo București

Universitatea Craiova

Round of 32	CS Târgovişte	0–3 (Forfeit)	Universitatea Craiova
Round of 16	FCM Brașov	0–1	Universitatea Craiova
Quarter-finals	Universitatea Craiova	3–1 (a.e.t.)	AS Mizil
Semi-finals	Universitatea Craiova	2–0	Politehnica Iași

== Match details ==
23 June 1985
17:30 EET

Steaua București	2–1	Universitatea Craiova
Lăcătuș 10'; Pițurcă 73'	Report	Cârțu 69'

23 August, Bucharest
Attendance: 60,000
Referee: Dan Petrescu (Bucharest)

GK	1	(Romania) Helmut Duckadam
DF	2	(Romania) Ștefan Iovan
DF	4	(Romania) Adrian Bumbescu
DF	6	(Romania) Miodrag Belodedici
DF	3	(Romania) Augustin Eduard
MF	8	(Romania) Ștefan Petcu
MF	11	(Romania) László Bölöni
MF	5	(Romania) Tudorel Stoica
MF	10	(Romania) Mihail Majearu (substituted off) 73'
FW	7	(Romania) Marius Lăcătuș (substituted off) 51'
FW	9	(Romania) Victor Pițurcă
Substitutions:
FW	14	(Romania) Gabi Balint (substituted in) 51'
FW	15	(Romania) Marin Radu (substituted in) 73'
Manager:
(Romania) Emerich Jenei

GK	1	(Romania) Silviu Lung
DF	2	(Romania) Nicolae Negrilă
DF	6	(Romania) Costică Ștefănescu
DF	3	(Romania) Nicolae Tilihoi (red card) 90'
DF	4	(Romania) Marin Matei
MF	5	(Romania) Adrian Popescu
MF	8	(Romania) Vasile Mănăilă
MF	10	(Romania) Mircea Irimescu (red card) 66'
FW	7	(Romania) Ion Geolgău (substituted off) 67'
FW	9	(Romania) Marian Bâcu
FW	11	(Romania) Sorin Cârțu
Substitutions:
DF	13	(Romania) Emil Săndoi (substituted in) 67'
Manager:
(Romania) Florin Halagian & (Romania) Silviu Stănescu

MATCH OFFICIALS

- Assistant referees:
  - (Romania) Mircea Salomir
  - (Romania) Adrian Porumboiu

== See also ==
- List of Cupa României finals
