= Marin Radu =

Romanian footballer

Personal information
- Date of birth: 15 March 1956 (age 70)
- Place of birth: Mareș, Argeș County, Romania
- Height: 1.74 m (5 ft 9 in)
- Position: Striker

Youth career
- 1968–1974: Argeș Pitești

Senior career*
Years	Team	Apps	(Gls)
1974–1983	Argeș Pitești	260	(148)
1983–1984	Olt Scornicești	16	(8)
1984–1986	Steaua București	44	(11)
1986–1987	Argeș Pitești	33	(8)
1988–1990	Inter Sibiu (Note: The statistics for the 1987–88 Divizia B season are unavailable.)	32	(16)
1990–1991	Șoimii IPA Sibiu		
Total		385	(191)

International career
1976–1982	Romania	7	(0)

Managerial career
- 1998–?: Cimentul Fieni
- 2006: Olt Slatina
- 2007–2008: Buftea
- 2008–2010: Cisnădie
- 2010–?: Petrolul Videle
Medal record
Representing Steaua București
European Cup
Gold medal – first place	Seville 1986
- * Club domestic league appearances and goals

Marin Radu (born 15 March 1956) is a retired Romanian football striker and manager, best known for his playing stints with Argeș Pitești and Steaua București.

== Club career ==
Radu was born on 15 March 1956 in Mareș, Argeș County, Romania. He began playing junior-level football at Argeș Pitești in 1968. Radu made his Divizia A debut on 11 August 1974 under coach Florin Halagian in a 3–1 away loss to FC Constanța in which he scored his side's goal. In the 1978–79 UEFA Cup edition, he helped them eliminate Panathinaikos in the first round, scoring a goal in the 5–1 aggregate victory. In the following round they met Valencia led by Mario Kempes, earning a 2–1 win in the first leg, but they lost the second one with 5–2, thus the campaign ending. In the same season, Radu formed a successful trio in the offence with Nicolae Dobrin and Doru Nicolae, being used by coach Halagian in 29 games in which he scored 22 goals. He netted a brace in the final game of the season against Dinamo București, which ended with a 4–3 victory that helped Argeș win the title, and made him the top-scorer of the season. In the following season he scored a goal in the 3–2 victory on aggregate against AEK Athens in the first round of the 1979–80 European Cup, the team being eliminated in the following round by title holders and eventual winners, Nottingham Forest. He scored a personal record of 28 goals in the 1980–81 season that earned him his second top-scorer title. In the 1981–82 UEFA Cup edition, after scoring a goal for Argeș in a 2–2 draw against Aberdeen, he was wanted by the opponent's coach, Alex Ferguson. However, during that time, the communist regime did not allow players to transfer outside the country.

After nine seasons spent at Argeș, Radu went to play for one season at Olt Scornicești where he worked once again with Halagian. Afterwards, he joined Steaua București, reuniting for a while with Halagian. There, in the first season he helped the team win The Double, being used by coaches Halagian and Emerich Jenei in 23 league games in which he scored seven goals. He also played in the Cupa României final when he was sent in the 73rd minute to replace Mihail Majearu in the 2–1 victory against Universitatea Craiova. In his second season spent with The Military Men he won another title, contributing with four goals in 21 appearances given to him by Jenei. The coach also used him in eight games in the historical 1985–86 European Cup campaign in which Radu scored one goal in the first round against Vejle. He then entered the field in the 112th minute to replace Victor Pițurcă in the 2–0 victory after the penalty shoot-out in the final against Barcelona.

Afterwards, Radu returned to play for Argeș Pitești for one and a half seasons. Subsequently, he switched teams again, this time going to Divizia B club Inter Sibiu, helping them get promoted to the first league. He made his last Divizia A appearance on 22 October 1989 in Inter's 3–0 away loss to Jiul Petroșani, totaling 385 matches with 191 goals in the competition and 23 games with four goals in European competitions. Radu retired after spending the 1990–91 Divizia B season at Șoimii IPA Sibiu. His career was affected by injuries, as he suffered three major ones which kept him off the field for about one and a half years. One of them occurred while he was playing for Argeș and the other two while being at Steaua. All of these incidents happened in games against Dinamo București and were caused by collisions with Alexandru Nicolae.

== International career ==
Radu played seven games for Romania, making his debut on 12 May 1976 when coach Ștefan Kovács sent him in the 60th minute to replace Stelian Anghel in a 1–0 away loss to Bulgaria in the 1973–76 Balkan Cup first leg final. He also appearing in the 3–2 home victory in the second leg of the final. His third game was also against Bulgaria, a 2–0 home victory in the successful 1977–80 Balkan Cup. Radu played in a 1–1 draw against Cyprus during the Euro 1980 qualifiers. His last appearance for the national team was in a 1982 friendly against East Germany which ended with a 4–1 loss.

== Personal life ==
His brother, Nicolae, was also a footballer who played for Argeș Pitești, and together they won the 1978–79 Divizia A championship.

In 2010, Radu was awarded the Honorary Citizen of Pitești title. On 25 March 2008, he was decorated by the president of Romania, Traian Băsescu for the winning of the 1985–86 European Cup with Ordinul "Meritul Sportiv" — (The Order "The Sportive Merit") class II.

== Honours ==
=== Club ===
Argeș Pitești

- Divizia A: 1978–79

Steaua București

- Divizia A: 1984–85, 1985–86
- Cupa României: 1984–85
- European Cup: 1985–86

Inter Sibiu

- Divizia B: 1987–88

=== International ===
Romania

- Balkan Cup: 1977–80, runner-up 1973–76

=== Individual ===
- Divizia A top-scorer: 1978–79, 1980–81
