= Ioan Mărginean =

Romanian footballer

Personal information
- Date of birth: 13 October 1960 (age 66)
- Place of birth: Cugir, Romania
- Height: 1.84 m (6 ft 0 in)
- Position: Central defender

Youth career
- 1972–1979: Metalurgistul Cugir

Senior career*
| Years | Team | Apps | (Gls) |
| 1979 | Metalurgistul Cugir | | |
| 1980–1984 | Dinamo București | 46 | (2) |
| 1984–1988 | Corvinul Hunedoara | 118 | (5) |
| 1988–1992 | Unirea Alba Iulia (Note: The statistics for the 1988–89, 1989–90 and 1990–91 Divizia B seasons are unavailable.) | 29 | (0) |
| Total | | 193 | (7) |

International career
| 1980–1984 | Romania U21 | 9 | (0) |
- * Club domestic league appearances and goals

Ioan Mărginean (born 13 October 1960) is a Romanian former football defender. He was part of Dinamo București's team that reached the semi-finals in the 1983–84 European Cup season.

== Club career ==
Mărginean, nicknamed "Limoniu", was born on 13 October 1960 in Cugir, Romania. He began playing senior-level football in 1979 for local club Metalurgistul in Divizia B.

In 1980, Mărginean moved to Dinamo București where he made his Divizia A debut on 23 March when coach Angelo Niculescu sent him to replace Florin Cheran in the 14th minute of a 0–0 draw against ASA Târgu Mureș. He scored his first league goal on 31 October 1981 with a powerful 30-meter shot in the final minutes of a 4–1 win over FCM Bacău. However, none of his teammates came to congratulate him because it was a fixed match which Dinamo had to win only by two goals. Subsequently, he played his first game in a European competition in a 1–0 loss to IFK Göteborg during the 1981–82 UEFA Cup. Mărginean spent a total of five seasons playing for Dinamo, winning three consecutive Divizia A titles from 1982 to 1984. For the first one, he contributed under coach Valentin Stănescu with one goal scored in six matches. In the second, he played only one game and in the third he made 19 appearances, scoring once, working with coach Nicolae Dumitru for both. Mărginean also won two Cupa României with The Red Dogs, but played in only one of the finals, the one in 1984 when coach Dumitru sent him in the 24th minute to substitute Nelu Stănescu in the 2–1 win over rivals Steaua București. During the 1983–84 European Cup edition, he played in the 2–1 home loss to Liverpool in the semi-finals.

In 1984, Mărginean joined Corvinul Hunedoara. There, he netted a brace in a 2–2 draw against Victoria București. Before the game, the leaders of the Ministry of Internal Affairs—who also managed Victoria and employed Mărginean—pressured him to let Victoria win. Because he scored two goals and the match ended in a draw, he was forced to resign from his job at the Miliția. On 22 June 1988, he made his last Divizia A appearance in Corvinul's 2–1 away loss to Rapid București, totaling 164 matches with seven goals in the competition. In 1988, Mărginean went to play for Divizia B side Unirea Alba Iulia where he ended his career in 1992.

== International career ==
From 1980 to 1984, Mărginean made nine appearances for Romania's under-21 national team.

== Executive career ==
After he ended his playing career, Mărginean worked as a club official for various teams: Unirea Alba Iulia (1992–2000, president), Extensiv Craiova (2000–2002, vice-president), FC Brașov (2003–2004, vice-president), Ceahlăul Piatra Neamț (2005–2008, vice-president), Universitatea Cluj (2008–2015, president), Gaz Metan Mediaș (2016–2020, president), FC Brașov Steagul Renaște (2021–2022, president).

== Honours ==
Dinamo București

- Divizia A: 1981–82, 1982–83, 1983–84
- Cupa României: 1981–82, 1983–84
