= Augustin Eduard =

Romanian former professional footballer

Personal information
- Date of birth: 1 August 1962 (age 64)
- Place of birth: Târgoviște, Romania
- Position: Defender

Youth career
- 1976–1980: Argeș Pitești

Senior career*
Years	Team	Apps	(Gls)
1980–1982	Argeș Pitești	21	(0)
1982–1985	Steaua București	78	(1)
1985–1990	Argeș Pitești	149	(29)
1990–1991	Dinamo București	11	(0)
1991–1993	Gloria Bistrița	28	(0)
Total		287	(30)

International career
1981–1982	Romania U20	6	(1)
1987	Romania	1	(0)

Managerial career
- 2008–2013: Argeș Pitești (youth center)
- 2015–2017: Unirea Bascov (youth center)
- 2017: Argeș Pitești (youth center)
- 2017: Argeș Pitești (caretaker)
- 2017–2019: Argeș Pitești (youth center)
- 2019: Argeș Pitești
- 2019–: Argeș Pitești (youth center)
- * Club domestic league appearances and goals as of 14 April 2019

Augustin Eduard (born 1 August 1962) is a Romanian former professional footballer and currently a manager.

== Club career ==
Eduard was born on 1 August 1962 in Târgoviște, Romania, but his family moved to Pitești when he was a child where he grew up in the Frații Golești neighborhood. In 1976, Argeș Pitești's youth coach, Leonte Ianovschi, noticed his talent and brought him to the team with whom in 1980 he won the national junior championship. On 2 August 1980, just one day after he turned 18, coach Florin Halagian gave him his Divizia A debut in Argeș Pitești's 3–2 away loss to Universitatea Craiova, playing alongside his childhood idol Nicolae Dobrin. He started playing in European competitions during the 1981–82 UEFA Cup edition, appearing in a 2–2 draw against Alex Ferguson's Aberdeen.

In 1982, Eduard went to Steaua București where in his first season he scored a goal in a 1–1 draw against rivals Dinamo București. He won The Double with The Military Men in the 1984–85 season when he was used in 24 league matches by coaches Halagian and Emerich Jenei and played the entire match in the 2–1 victory in the Cupa României final over "U" Craiova. In the same season he appeared in both legs of the 1–0 aggregate loss to A.S. Roma in the first round of the European Cup Winners' Cup.

In 1985, Eduard made a comeback to Argeș for a five-year stint, becoming the team's captain. The team reached the 1987–88 Balkans Cup final, where he played in both legs of the 6–1 aggregate loss to Slavia Sofia. He scored a career-best 16 goals in the 1988–89 season. Eduard joined Dinamo București for the 1990–91 season, where he played two games in the European Cup as the team got past St Patrick's Athletic in the first round, being eliminated in the following one by Porto. Eduard ended his career in 1993 after playing two seasons for Gloria Bistrița, totaling 287 Divizia A matches with 30 goals scored.

== International career ==
Eduard was selected by coach Constantin Cernăianu to be part of Romania's under-20 squad for the 1981 World Youth Championship in Australia. He appeared in six games, scoring once in a 2–1 win over Uruguay in the quarter-finals, helping the team finish the tournament in third position, winning the bronze medal.

Eduard played one friendly game for Romania when on 8 April 1987, coach Emerich Jenei sent him at half-time to replace Anton Weissenbacher in a 3–2 home victory against Israel.

== Managerial career ==
After he ended his career, Eduard worked as a youth coach, mostly at Argeș Pitești, but also at Unirea Bascov. He had two spells as head coach for Argeș Pitești's senior squad in Liga II, first as a caretaker in 2017 and the second in 2019.

== Honours ==
Steaua București

- Divizia A: 1984–85
- Cupa României: 1984–85

Argeș Pitești

- Balkans Cup runner-up: 1987–88
