= Helmut Duckadam =

Romanian footballer (1959–2024)

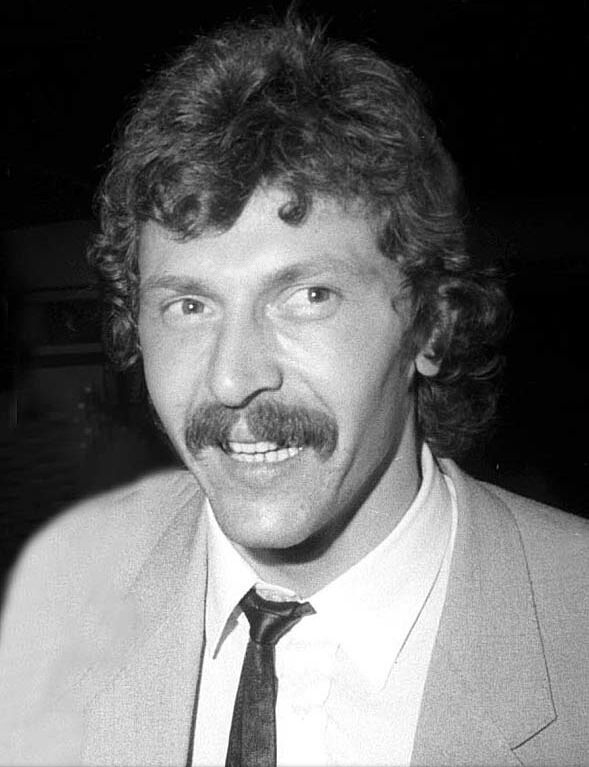
- Duckadam in 1986

Personal information
- Date of birth: 1 April 1959
- Place of birth: Semlac, Romania
- Date of death: 2 December 2024 (aged 65)
- Place of death: Bucharest, Romania
- Height: 1.93 m (6 ft 4 in)
- Position: Goalkeeper

Youth career
- 1974–1975: Semlecana Semlac
- 1975–1977: Școala Sportivă Gloria Arad
- 1977–1978: UTA Arad

Senior career*
Years	Team	Apps	(Gls)
1977–1978	→ Constructorul Arad (loan)		
1978–1982	UTA Arad (Note: The statistics for the 1979–80, 1980–81 and 1982–83 Divizia B seasons are unavailable.)	53	(0)
1983–1986	Steaua București	80	(0)
1989–1991	Vagonul Arad		
1993–1994	CPL Arad		
Total		133	(0)

International career
1979–1983	Romania U21	4	(0)
1982–1985	Romania B	2	(0)
1982	Romania	2	(0)
- * Club domestic league appearances and goals

Helmut Duckadam (1 April 1959 – 2 December 2024) was a Romanian professional footballer who played as a goalkeeper.

Duckadam was dubbed "the Hero of Seville" due to his performance in the 1986 European Cup final, won by his club Steaua București, where he saved all four penalties against Barcelona in the penalty shoot-out, for the first time in football history. He represented four other teams in a 12-year senior career.

== Club career ==
Duckadam was born on 1 April 1959 in Semlac, Arad County, Romania, being of Banat Swabian (German) descent, growing up as a fan of goalkeepers Gordon Banks, Luis Arconada and Stere Adamache. He started to play football at local club Semlecana. Afterwards he spent a few years at Școala Sportivă Gloria Arad, then in 1977 he went to the youth center of UTA Arad. Shortly after he started his senior career as he was loaned to Divizia C club, Constructorul Arad where he was wanted by coach Nicolae Dumitrescu. During this period spent at Constructorul he decided to wear a moustache, being inspired to do so by goalkeeper Enver Marić. After one year, Duckadam returned to UTA where on 14 September 1978 he made his Divizia A debut when coach Ion Ionescu sent him on the field for the last 20 minutes of a 2–0 loss against CS Târgoviște, managing not to concede any goals. The team was relegated at the end of his first season, but Duckadam stayed with the club, helping it achieve promotion back to the first league after two seasons, managing in this period to score a goal with a long-shot from his box in a game against FCM Reșița. However, after only one season, The Old Lady was relegated once again and after one more half a season spent in the second league, he went to play for Steaua București.

In his first two seasons with Steaua, Duckadam had to compete with Vasile Iordache and Gheorghe Nițu. Afterwards he became first-choice goalkeeper, winning The Double in the 1984–85 season when he was used in 31 league matches by coaches Florin Halagian and Emerich Jenei, managing to not concede any goals for 606 consecutive minutes. He also played the entire match in the 2–1 victory in the Cupa României final over Universitatea Craiova. In the same season he made his debut in European competitions as he appeared in both legs of the 1–0 aggregate loss to A.S. Roma in the first round of the European Cup Winners' Cup, managing to save a penalty executed by Ubaldo Righetti. In the following season, Duckadam won another championship title, playing 32 league games under the guidance of Jenei. The coach also used him in all nine games in the historical European Cup campaign in which Duckadam conceded only five goals.

Video
- Legendary Moments: Duckadam on his Barcelona penalty heroics on YouTube

In the final he saved four consecutive penalty shots in the shoot-out, from José Ramón Alexanko, Ángel Pedraza, Pichi Alonso and Marcos in the eventual 2–0 victory against Barcelona. After saving the fourth penalty, Romanian commentator Teoharie Coca-Cosma enthusiastically yelled the famous phrase:"Duckadam saves! We are finalists! We won the Cup!" His performance of saving four penalties in one game was listed as a record by The Guinness Book of World Records. Steaua's first game after their European Cup win was a 5–1 victory over Progresul București in the Cupa României quarter-finals in which Duckadam scored the second goal of his career from a penalty, encouraged by the 70,000 fans who chanted his name when it was awarded. Duckadam won the Romanian Footballer of the Year award in 1986 and in the same year he was nominated for the Ballon d'Or.

In the summer of 1986, while at a campfire in Arad, Duckadam suffered an accident as he slipped on the grass, leaning on his right arm, which resulted in great pain and his hand bruised. At the hospital he was diagnosed with a blood clot that blocked the circulation in his arm so he underwent an operation. Because of this he couldn't play football at high level anymore, three years later attempting a comeback at Vagonul Arad where he stayed from 1989 until 1991, then between 1993 and 1994 he was at CPL Arad, with both spells in the Romanian lower leagues.

== International career ==
Between 1979 and 1985, Duckadam made four appearances for Romania's under-21 squad and two for the B side.

Duckadam was first called-up to play for Romania's national team while playing for UTA Arad in Divizia B, as coach Mircea Lucescu wanted to use him in a match against Switzerland. However, Duckadam was very nervous on the morning of the game day, telling Lucescu that he couldn't play. Eventually Dumitru Moraru played in the 0–0 draw against the Swiss. His first appearance for The Tricolours took place on 1 September 1982, managing to keep a clean sheet as Lucescu used him the entire match in the 1–0 friendly win over Denmark. His second and last appearance for the national team took place on 17 November of the same year when Lucescu sent him in the 87th minute to replace Moraru in a 4–1 friendly loss to East Germany.

== After retirement ==
After retiring from football, Duckadam worked for a while in the late 1990s as a major for the Romanian Border Police in Arad County. Around the same time, he also opened a football school in Arad, named after himself. In 2002, he became a member of the Romanian Humanist Party, but left it in 2004 to join the New Generation Party where he served as the party's vice-president. In 2003, Duckadam won at the Diversity Immigrant Visa organized by the American embassy from Bucharest and emigrated with his family to the United States. However, he soon returned to Arad, as he was unable to adjust to the life in the US.

In 2006 he worked for a few months as the general manager of UTA Arad. On 25 March 2008, Duckadam was decorated by the President of Romania, Traian Băsescu, with the Ordinul "Meritul Sportiv" – (The Medal "The Sportive Merit") – class II, for his part in winning the 1986 European Cup. From 2010 until 2020, he was the honorary president of FCSB.

He was named Honorary Citizen of Bucharest in 2017. In the final years of his life he regularly appeared as a guest on Digi Sport's "Fotbal Club" programme.

== Writing ==
He wrote one autobiographical book:

- Duckadam, Helmut (1989). O victorie aplaudată [An applauded victory] (in Romanian). București: Editura Militară. ISBN 978-9-7332-0102-1.

In 2022, author Milan Radin wrote a book inspired from the life of Duckadam titled Der Tormann (The Goalkeeper).

== Death ==
Duckadam died on 2 December 2024 in the Military Hospital in Bucharest, at the age of 65. Two days later, President Klaus Iohannis awarded him post-mortem with the Order of the Star of Romania in the rank of Knight.

On 30 January 2025, during a Europa League match against Manchester United, FCSB's fans displayed a scenography consisting of a giant image of Duckadam holding the European Cup, beneath which was written:"Legends never die".

On 13 November 2025, a bronze statue depicting him holding four balls was unveiled to the public in his native Semlac. Beneath it, his name is inscribed, accompanied by the text:"He saved 4 penalty kicks in the European Champions Cup final played in Seville on 7 May 1986 between Steaua București and FC Barcelona."

== Honours ==
UTA Arad

- Divizia B: 1980–81

Steaua București

- Divizia A: 1984–85, 1985–86
- Cupa României: 1984–85
- European Cup: 1985–86

Individual

- Romanian Footballer of the Year: 1986
- Ballon d'Or: 1986 (8th place)
