= 2000 Saudi Crown Prince Cup =

2000 Crown Prince Cup
Tournament details
- Country: Saudi Arabia
- Dates: 17 February – 12 May 2000
- Teams: 44 (all); 32 (qualifying competition); 16 (main competition)

Final positions
- Champions: Al-Hilal (3rd title)
- Runners-up: Al-Shabab
- Asian Cup Winners' Cup: Al-Hilal

Tournament statistics
- Matches played: 15
- Goals scored: 49 (3.27 per match)
- Top goal scorer(s): Abdullah Al-Jamaan (5 goals)
- (Note: All statistics do not include qualifying play-offs)

The 2000 Crown Prince Cup was the 25th season of the Saudi premier football knockout tournament since its establishment in 1957. It started with the qualifying rounds on 17 February 2000 and concluded with the final on 12 May 2000.

In the final, Al-Hilal defeated defending champions Al-Shabab 3–0 to secure their third title. The final was held at the Prince Abdullah Al-Faisal Stadium in Jeddah for the sixth time. As winners of the tournament, Al-Hilal qualified for the 2001–02 Asian Cup Winners' Cup.

== Qualifying rounds ==
All of the competing teams that are not members of the Premier League competed in the qualifying rounds to secure one of 4 available places in the Round of 16. The qualifying competition began on 17 February 2000. Second Division side Al-Hazem and Third Division sides Al-Maseef, Al-Oyoon and Al-Watani qualified.

=== First round ===
Home team (tier)	Score	Away team (tier)
Thursday 17 February 2000
Al-Safa (4)	0–5	Al-Qadisiyah (2)
Al-Nahda (3)	5–2	Modhar (3)
Al-Taawoun (2)	0–1	Al-Jabalain (4)
Al-Hazem (3)	1–0	Al-Arabi (4)
Al-Tuhami (4)	0–3	Hajer (2)
Abha (3)	0–1	Al-Maseef (4)
Al-Akhdoud (4)	1–0	Najran (2)
Al-Shoulla (2)	1–2 (asdet)	Al-Diriyah (4)
Zahran (4)	2–2 (6–5 p)	Okaz (4)
Ohod (2)	2–3	Al-Majd (4)
Al-Qarah (3)	5–1	Al-Rawdhah (3)
Al-Khaleej (2)	N/A	N/A
Friday 18 February 2000
Al-Watani (4)	1–0	Al-Ansar (2)
Al-Hamadah (3)	1–0	Al-Kholood (3)
Saturday 19 February 2000
Al-Orobah (2)	6–0	Al-Entelaq (4)
Al-Fateh (2)	2–3 (asdet)	Al-Oyoon (4)

=== Second round ===
Home team (tier)	Score	Away team (tier)
Thursday 24 February 2000
Al-Orobah (2)	1–1 (3–4 p)	Al-Watani (4)
Al-Maseef (4)	1–0	Hajer (2)
Al-Akhdoud (4)	1–0	Al-Khaleej (2)
Al-Qadisiyah (2)	3–2	Al-Nahda (3)
Al-Oyoon (4)	1–1 (6–5 p)	Al-Qarah (3)
Al-Hazem (3)	1–0	Al-Jabalain (4)
Friday 25 February 2000
Al-Hamadah (3)	N/A	Al-Diriyah (4)
Al-Majd (4)	N/A	Zahran (4)

=== Final Round ===
Home team (tier)	Score	Away team (tier)
Thursday 2 March 2000
Al-Hamadah (3)	1–2 (asdet)	Al-Hazem (3)
Al-Maseef (4)	3–2	Al-Akhdoud (4)
Al-Qadisiyah (2)	3–4 (asdet)	Al-Oyoon (4)
Al-Majd (4)	0–0 (4–5 p)	Al-Watani (4)

== Bracket ==
Round of 16
H	Al-Watani	0
A	Al-Hilal	4
A	Al-Hazem	1
H	Al-Maseef	0
A	Al-Ittihad	3
H	Al-Wehda	0
H	Sdoos	1
A	Al-Ahli	2
H	Al-Shabab	3
A	Al-Nassr	1
A	Al-Tai	4
H	Al-Raed	0
A	Al-Najma	1
H	Al-Riyadh	3
H	Al-Ettifaq (asdet)	3
A	Al-Oyoon	2

Quarter-finals
A	Al-Hilal	2
H	Al-Hazem	0
H	Al-Ittihad	2
A	Al-Ahli	1
H	Al-Shabab	6
A	Al-Tai	2
A	Al-Riyadh	0 (7)
H	Al-Ettifaq (pen.)	0 (8)

Semi-finals
H	Al-Hilal	2
A	Al-Ittihad	0
A	Al-Shabab	2
H	Al-Ettifaq	1

Final
–	Al-Hilal	3
–	Al-Shabab	0

== Round of 16 ==
The draw for the Round of 16 was held on 4 March 2000. The Round of 16 fixtures were played on 28, 29, 30 and 31 March 2000. All times are local, AST (UTC+3).

28 March 2000 1	Al-Raed (1)	0–4	Al-Tai (1)	Buraidah
20:00		Report	Al-Saqri 24'; Al-Ghazi 45'; Al-Rashid 83'; Al-Suleiman 90'	Stadium: Prince Abdullah bin Abdul Aziz Stadium; Referee: Abdullah Al-Jarwan

28 March 2000 2	Al-Ettifaq (1)	3–2 (a.e.t.)	Al-Oyoon (4)	Dammam
20:00	Al-Fuhaid 45'; Al-Ali 58'; Al-Dossari 96'	Report	Al-Assaf 40'; Al-Ghareeb 81' (pen.)	Stadium: Prince Mohamed bin Fahd Stadium; Referee: Nasser Al-Hamdan

29 March 2000 4	Al-Maseef (4)	0–1	Al-Hazem (3)	Abha
16:00		Report	Al-Rumaihi 30'	Stadium: Prince Sultan bin Abdul Aziz Stadium; Referee: Khaled Al-Yami

29 March 2000 3	Al-Shabab (1)	3–1	Al-Nassr (1)	Riyadh
20:00	Al-Dawod 23'; Suroor 40'; Al-Otaibi 72'	Report	Yazid 55'	Stadium: King Fahd International Stadium; Referee: Mujeb Al-Dossari

30 March 2000 5	Al-Watani (4)	0–4	Al-Hilal (1)	Tabuk
16:00		Report	Al-Mofarij 16'; Al-Jamaan 39', 73', 77'	Stadium: King Khalid Sport City Stadium; Referee: Saleh Al-Shahrani

30 March 2000 6	Sdoos (1)	1–2	Al-Ahli (1)	Riyadh
20:00	Al-Taweel 71' (pen.)	Report	Pérez 14', 88'	Stadium: Prince Faisal bin Fahd Stadium; Referee: Yousef Al-Aqili

31 March 2000 7	Al-Wehda (1)	0–3	Al-Ittihad (1)	Mecca
20:00		Report	T. Al-Muwallad 66'; Al-Zahrani 72'; Idris 90'	Stadium: King Abdul Aziz Stadium; Referee: Abdulrahman Al-Zaid

31 March 2000 8	Al-Riyadh (1)	3–1	Al-Najma (1)	Riyadh
20:00	Al-Sobhi 50'; Diop 57' (pen.); Al-Dossari 88'	Report	Al-Munaif 47'	Stadium: Prince Faisal bin Fahd Stadium; Referee: Abdulrahman Al-Ghimlas

== Quarter-finals ==
The draw for the Quarter-finals was held on 1 April 2000. The Quarter-finals fixtures were played on 8 and 9 April 2000. All times are local, AST (UTC+3).

8 April 2000 11	Al-Hazem (3)	0–2	Al-Hilal (1)	Buraidah
16:00		Report	Al-Jamaan 18'; Dokhi 82'	Stadium: Prince Abdullah bin Abdul Aziz Stadium; Referee: Mohammed Al-Suwail

8 April 2000 9	Al-Ettifaq (1)	0–0 (a.e.t.) (7–6 p)	Al-Riyadh (1)	Dammam
20:30		Report		Stadium: Prince Mohamed bin Fahd Stadium; Referee: Mohammed Al-Beshri
	Penalties
	Al-Mogahwi (penalty scored); Saif (penalty scored); Al-Dossari (penalty missed); Al-Fuhaid (penalty scored); Al-Dubikhi (penalty scored); Al-Muwallad (penalty scored); Shehri (penalty scored); Al-Bahri (penalty scored)		(penalty missed) Diop; (penalty scored) Al-Jebreen; (penalty scored) Robson; (penalty scored) Al-Qumayzi; (penalty scored) R. Al-Dossari; (penalty scored) Al-Mufarrij; (penalty scored) Al-Qarni; (penalty missed) Al-Suwailem

9 April 2000 10	Al-Shabab (1)	6–2	Al-Tai (1)	Riyadh
20:15	Suroor 6'; Al-Qanat 13'; Al-Otaibi 65', 78'; Majrashi 69'; Al-Owairan 87'	Report	Al-Rashid 45', 90'	Stadium: Prince Faisal bin Fahd Stadium; Referee: Ibrahim Al-Omar

9 April 2000 12	Al-Ittihad (1)	2–1	Al-Ahli (1)	Jeddah
20:30	Al-Hadaithi 88', 90+2'	Report	Masaad 22'	Stadium: Prince Abdullah Al-Faisal Stadium; Referee: Omer Al Mehannah

== Semi-finals ==
The draw for the Semi-finals was held on 10 April 2000. The Semi-finals fixtures were played on 13 and 14 April 2000. All times are local, AST (UTC+3).

13 April 2000 14	Al-Ettifaq (1)	1–2	Al-Shabab (1)	Dammam
20:30	Al-Ali 60'	Report	Al-Waked 17'; Al-Khathran 88'	Stadium: Prince Mohamed bin Fahd Stadium; Referee: Dhafer Abo Zanda

14 April 2000 13	Al-Hilal (1)	2–0	Al-Ittihad (1)	Riyadh
20:30	Al-Jamaan 48'; Al-Jaber 75'	Report		Stadium: King Fahd International Stadium; Referee: Yousef Al-Aqili

== Final ==
The 2000 Crown Prince Cup Final was played on 12 May 2000 at the Prince Abdullah Al-Faisal Stadium in Jeddah between Al-Hilal and Al-Shabab. This was the sixth Crown Prince Cup final to be held at the stadium. The two sides met once in the final with Al-Shabab winning in 1999. This was a repeat of last season's final. This was Al-Shabab's sixth final and Al-Hilal's fourth final. All times are local, AST (UTC+3).

12 May 2000
20:45

Al-Hilal	3–0	Al-Shabab
Sérgio 62'; Al-Shalhoub 90'; Al-Ghamdi 90+4'	Report

Prince Abdullah Al-Faisal Stadium, Jeddah
Referee: Mohammed Al-Suwail

== Top goalscorers ==
Rank	Player	Club	Goals
1	(Saudi Arabia) Abdullah Al-Jamaan	Al-Hilal	5
2	(Saudi Arabia) Marzouk Al-Otaibi	Al-Shabab	3
2	(Saudi Arabia) Badr Al-Rashid	Al-Tai	3
4	(Colombia) Ricardo Pérez	Al-Ahli	2
4	(Saudi Arabia) Salem Suroor	Al-Shabab	2
4	(Saudi Arabia) Sulaiman Al-Hadaithi	Al-Ittihad	2
4	(Saudi Arabia) Hussain Al-Ali	Al-Ettifaq	2

== See also ==
- 1999–2000 Saudi Premier League
