= Dobroești =

- Commune
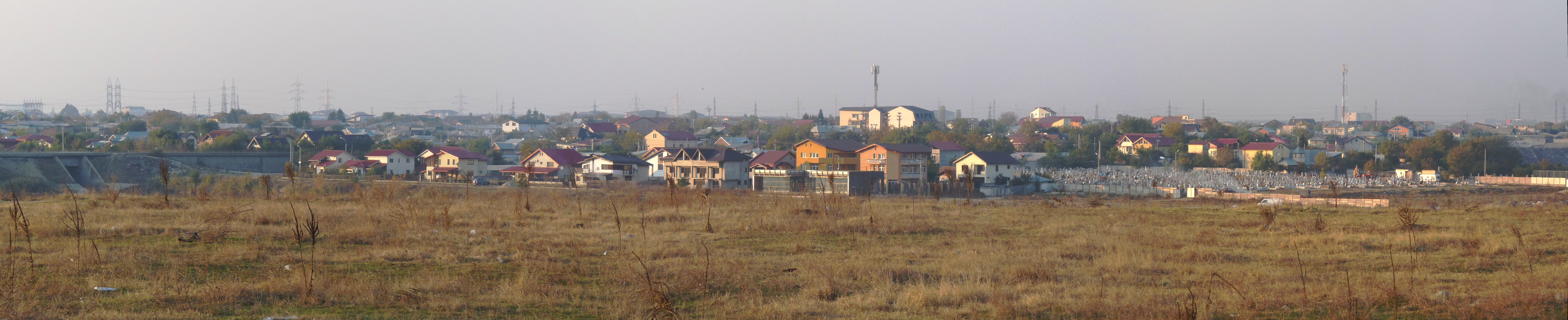

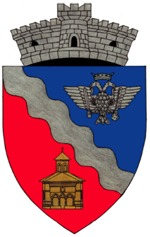
- Coat of arms

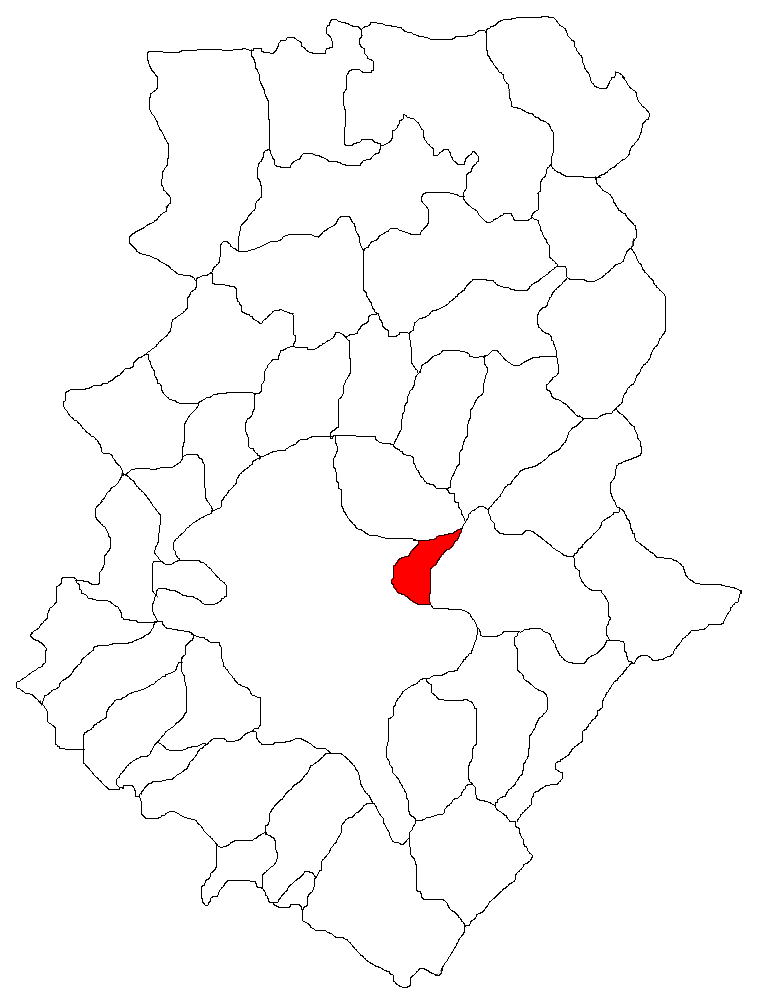
- Location in Ilfov County

- Location in Romania
- Coordinates: 44°27′04″N 26°10′50″E
- Country: Romania
- County: Ilfov

Government
  - Mayor (2020–2024): Valentin Laurențiu Condu (PSD)
- Area: 11.32 km^{2} (4.37 sq mi)
- Elevation: 61 m (200 ft)
- Population (2021-12-01): 16,875
  - Density: 1,491/km^{2} (3,861/sq mi)
- Time zone: UTC+02:00 (EET)
  - Summer (DST): UTC+03:00 (EEST)
- Postal code: 77115
- Area code: +(40) 21
- Vehicle reg.: IF
- Website: www.primariadobroesti.ro

Dobroești is a commune in the east of Ilfov County, Muntenia, Romania, right off the limits of Bucharest's Sector 2. It is composed of two villages, Dobroești and Fundeni. The name Dobroești is derived from South Slavic/Bulgarian "Dobro" (good) and Romanian suffix -ești. A modern shopping and apartment complex, for overseas Chinese, have been built in Dobroești, dubbed as Chinatown.

Historical population
Year	Pop.	±%
2002	6,589	—
2011	9,325	+41.5%
2021	16,875	+81.0%
Source: Census data

== Natives ==
- Aurel Beldeanu (born 1951), footballer
- Alexandru Custov (1954–2008), footballer
- Ștefan Sameș (1951–2011), footballer
