= Slobozia, Argeș =

Slobozia
- Commune
- Location in Romania
- Coordinates: 44°31′N 25°14′E
- Country: Romania
- County: Argeș
- Population (2021-12-01): 4,209
- Time zone: EET/EEST (UTC+2/+3)
- Vehicle reg.: AG

Slobozia is a commune in Argeș County, Muntenia, Romania. It is composed of two villages, Nigrișoara and Slobozia.

== Natives ==
- Viorel Turcu (1960–2020), footballer
