= Stadionul Municipal (Brașov) =

Coordinates: 45°39′27″N 25°34′15″E

- Interactive map of Stadionul Municipal
- Location: Braşov, Romania
- Owner: Municipality of Braşov
- Capacity: 25,000
- Surface: Grass

Construction
- Groundbreaking: 2008; 18 years ago
- Cost: €30 million

Stadionul Municipal is a proposed football stadium next to the Castra of Brașov in Braşov, Romania. Construction started in 2008, and was to be completed in 2010, but the project stopped after demolishing the old stadium due to a lack of funds. In late 2013 it was announced that construction would finally go forward. First months of 2014 saw €10 million secured of the total of €30-40 million. Most of the fund is to be federal, while the municipality only covers minority of its new stadium.
