= Semlac =

- Commune
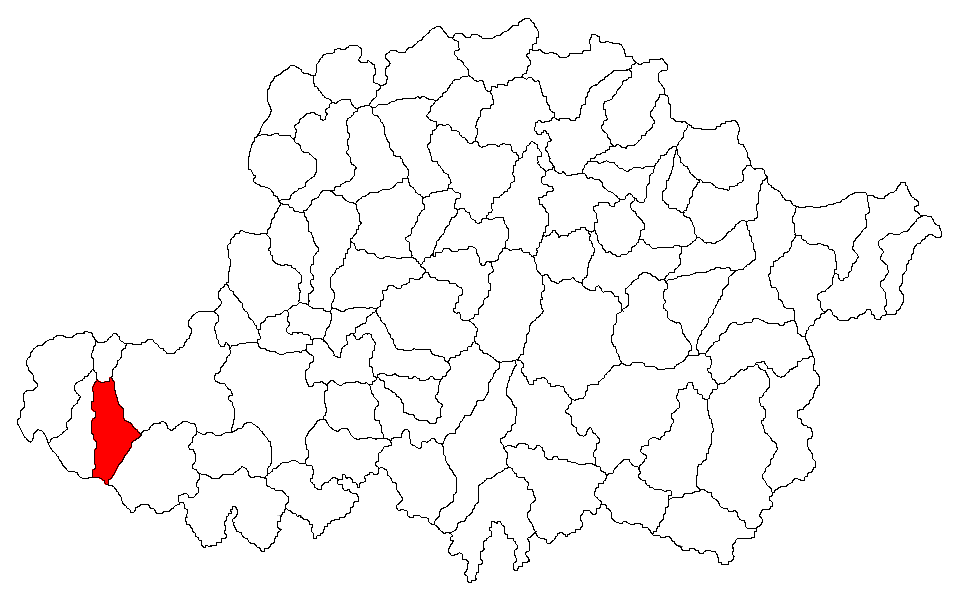
- Location in Arad County

- Location in Romania
- Coordinates: 46°7′N 20°56′E
- Country: Romania
- County: Arad

Government
  - Mayor (2020–2024): Letiția Stoian (Ind.)
- Area: 83.11 km^{2} (32.09 sq mi)
- Elevation: 90 m (300 ft)
- Population (2021-12-01): 3,474
  - Density: 41.80/km^{2} (108.3/sq mi)
- Time zone: EET/EEST (UTC+2/+3)
- Postal code: 317295
- Area code: +40 x57
- Vehicle reg.: AR
- Website: www.semlac.ro

Semlac (Hungarian: Szemlak) is a commune located in Arad County, in the western part of Romania, near the border with Hungary, is situated in the south-western part of the Arad Plateau, in the large valley of the Mureș River. Its territory occupies 8,311 ha (20,540 acres). It is composed of a single village, Semlac, situated 37 km (23 mi) from Arad.

== Population ==
According to the 2011 census, the commune has 3,667 inhabitants, out of which 78.4% were ethnic Romanians, 8.4% Roma, 2.67% Hungarians, and 2.32% Germans. At the 2021 census, Semlac had a population of 3,474; of those, 81.64% were Romanians, 6.48% Roma, 1.64% Germans, and 1.35% Hungarians.

== History ==
It is first mentioned in 1326. It was ravaged by the Turks in 1552, but later survived the occupation. In 1910, out of 5,676 inhabitants, there were 2,475 Romanians, 1,899 Germans, 601 Hungarians, 278 Slovaks, and 272 Ruthenians. Until the Treaty of Trianon, Arad County belonged to the district of Pecica. In 1992, out of 3,787 inhabitants, there were 2,947 Romanians, 286 Germans, 233 Gypsies, 181 Hungarians, and 140 others. To the south of the village, on the banks of the Mureș, lay the medieval village of Deușu, which has left no trace. The economy of the commune is mainly agrarian, the locality is well known in the region as an important grain-bearing vegetable-growing place. The livestock is based on pig and cattle raising.

== Tourism ==
Semlac contains a nature park.

== Notable people ==
- Helmut Duckadam (1959–2024), goalkeeper
- Alexandru Fântânaru (1895–1958), lawyer, executed by the Communist authorities
- Romul Ganea (1881–1960), priest and teacher, delegate at the Great National Assembly of Alba Iulia of 1918
- Otmar Szafnauer (born 1964), former CEO and former team principal of the BWT Alpine F1 Team
