= Ramón Sánchez-Pizjuán Stadium =

Association football stadium in Seville, Spain

Estadio Ramón Sánchez-Pizjuán
- Nervión
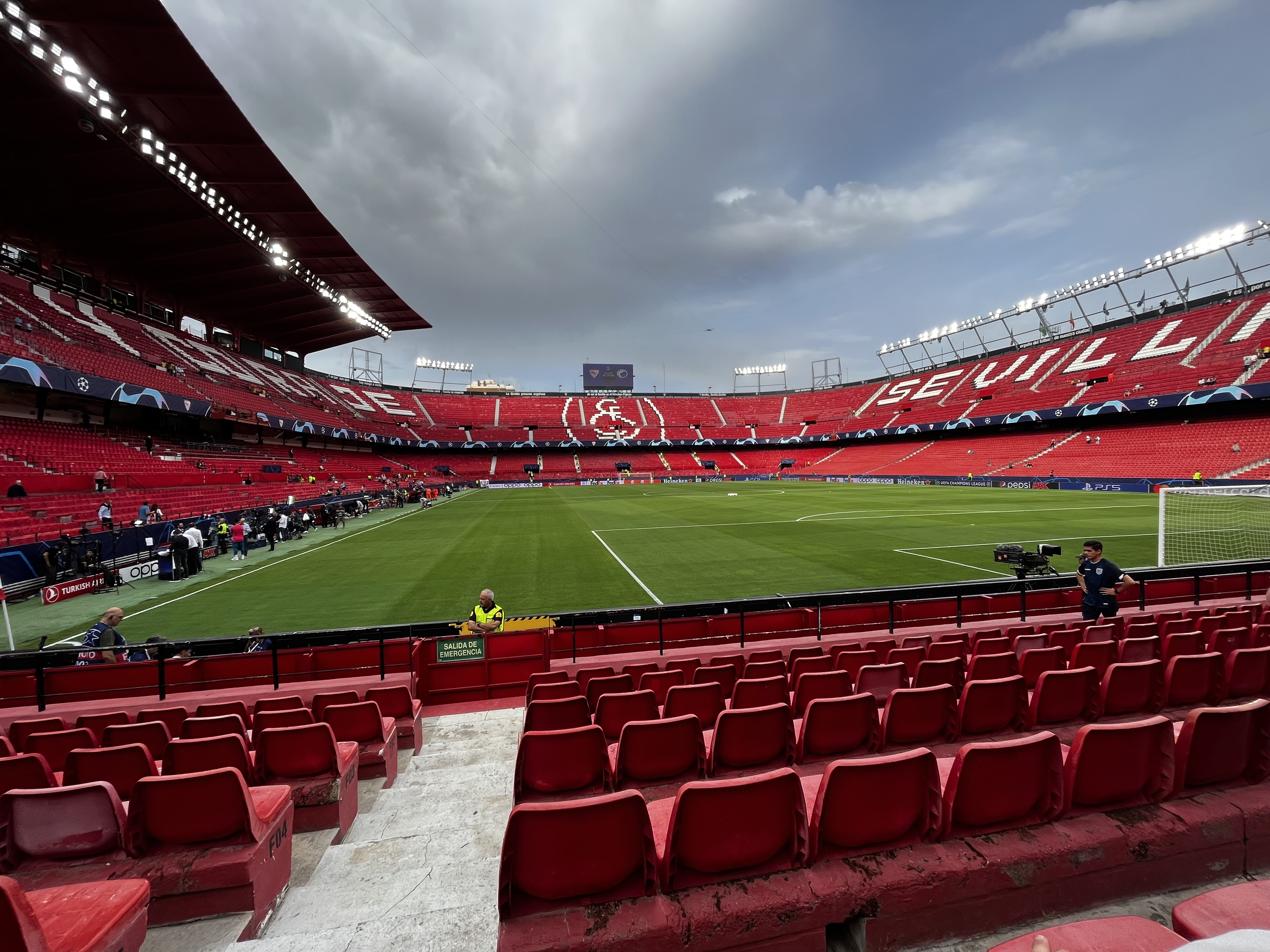
- The Ramón Sánchez-Pizjuán Stadium seen from inside UEFA
- Interactive map of Estadio Ramón Sánchez-Pizjuán
- Location: Seville, Andalusia, Spain
- Coordinates: 37.3840°N 5.9705°W
- Owner: Sevilla
- Operator: Sevilla
- Capacity: 43,751
- Surface: Grass
- Field size: 105 m × 68 m (344 ft × 223 ft)

Construction
- Built: 1955
- Opened: 7 September 1958
- Renovated: 1996, 2017
- Architects: James Cox; Manuel Muñoz Monasterio

Tenants
- Sevilla (1958–present); Spain national team (selected matches)

The Ramón Sánchez-Pizjuán Stadium (Spanish: Estadio Ramón Sánchez-Pizjuán; [esˈtaðjo raˈmon ˈsantʃeθ piθˈxwan]) is a football stadium in Seville, Spain. It is the home stadium of Sevilla, and is named after the club's former president, Ramón Sánchez-Pizjuán (1900–1956).

It was the venue for the 1986 European Cup Final between Steaua București and Barcelona and the 1982 World Cup semi-final game between West Germany and France. It was also the venue for the 2022 Europa League final between Eintracht Frankfurt and Rangers.

With a capacity of 43,751 seats, Ramón Sánchez-Pizjuán is the ninth-largest stadium in Spain and the third-largest in Andalusia.

== Historical background ==
The stadium is nicknamed "La Bombonera" (pronounced [la βomboˈneɾa]; more commonly used to refer to Estadio Alberto J. Armando, the home stadium of Boca Juniors) or "La Bombonera de Nervión" [la βomboˈneɾa ðe neɾˈβjon] due to the Nervión neighbourhood where the stadium is situated.

The Spain national team has never lost a game against an international team in this stadium.

In May 2018, the club announced an expansion project for the stadium that will eventually increase its seating capacity up to 47,000.

== 1982 FIFA World Cup ==
The stadium was one of the venues of the 1982 FIFA World Cup, and held the following matches:

Date	Team #1	Result	Team #2	Round	Attendance
14 June 1982	Brazil	2–1	Soviet Union	Group stage	68,000
8 July 1982	West Germany	3–3 (5–4 p)	France	Semi-finals	70,000

== European Finals ==
The stadium has held the following finals in UEFA competitions:

Date	Team #1	Result	Team #2	Round	Attendance
7 May 1986	(Romania) Steaua București	0–0 (2–0 p)	(Spain) Barcelona	1986 European Cup Final	70,000
18 May 2022	(Germany) Eintracht Frankfurt	1–1 (5–4 p)	(Scotland) Rangers	2022 UEFA Europa League Final	38,842

== Gallery ==
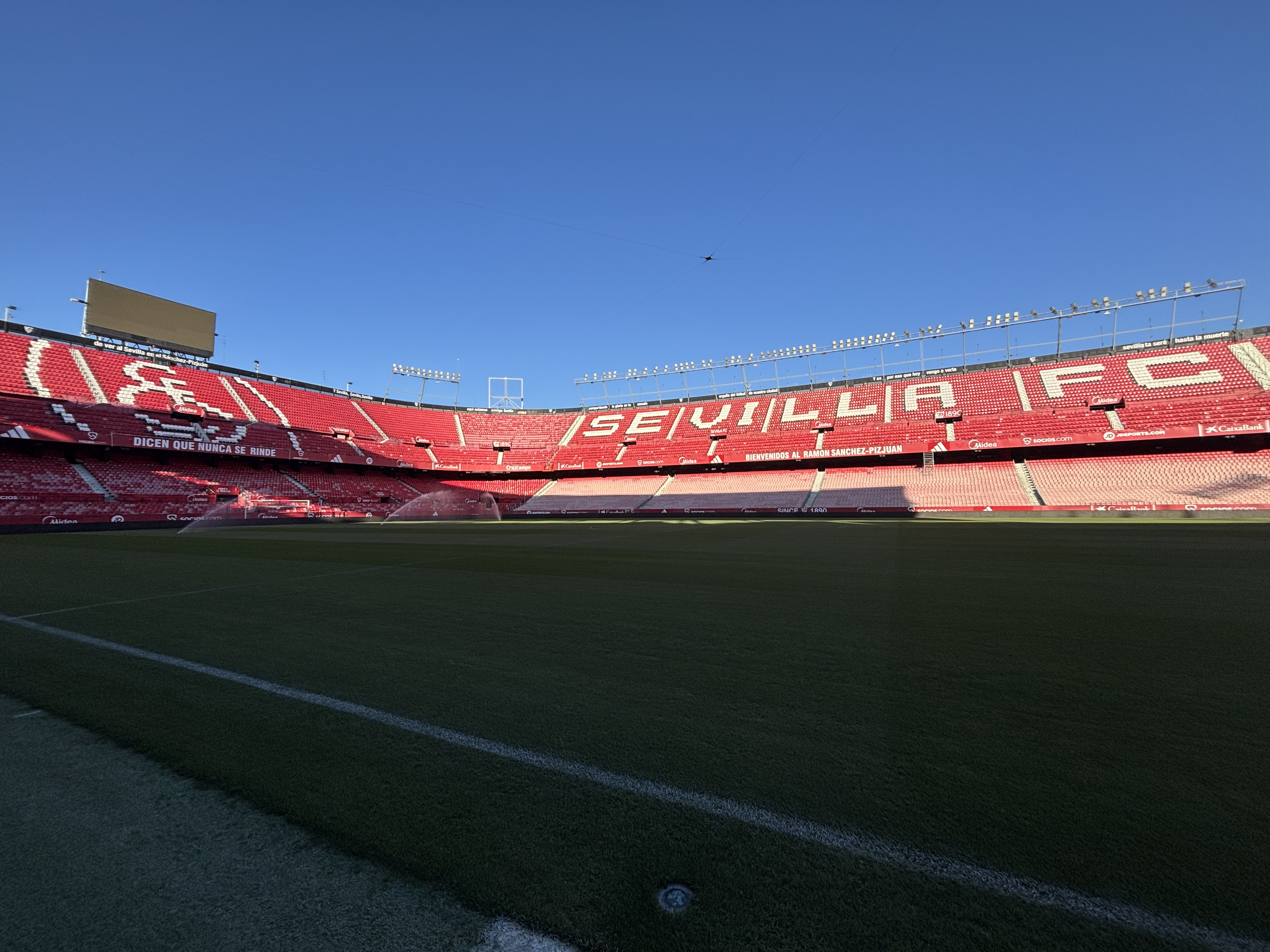

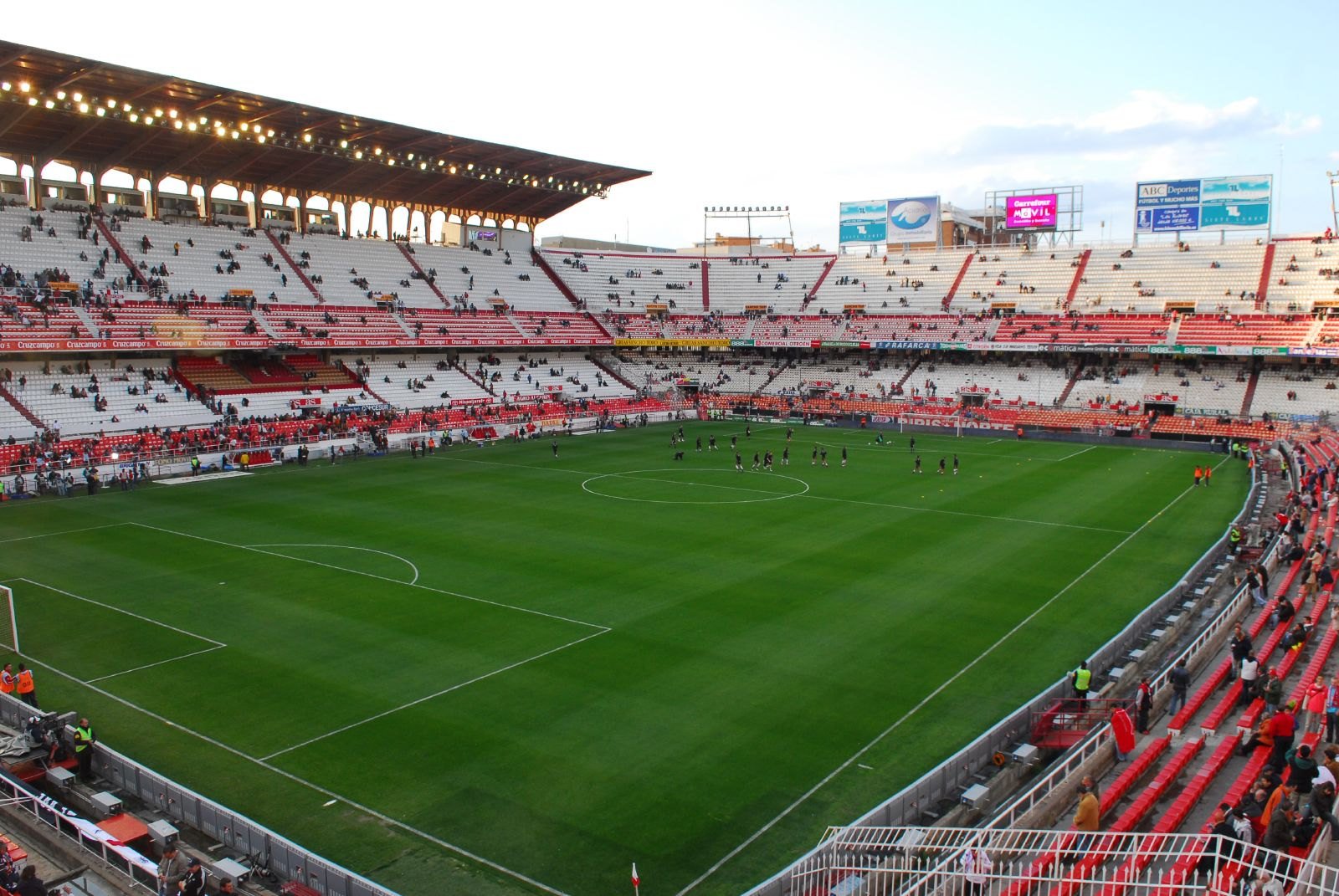

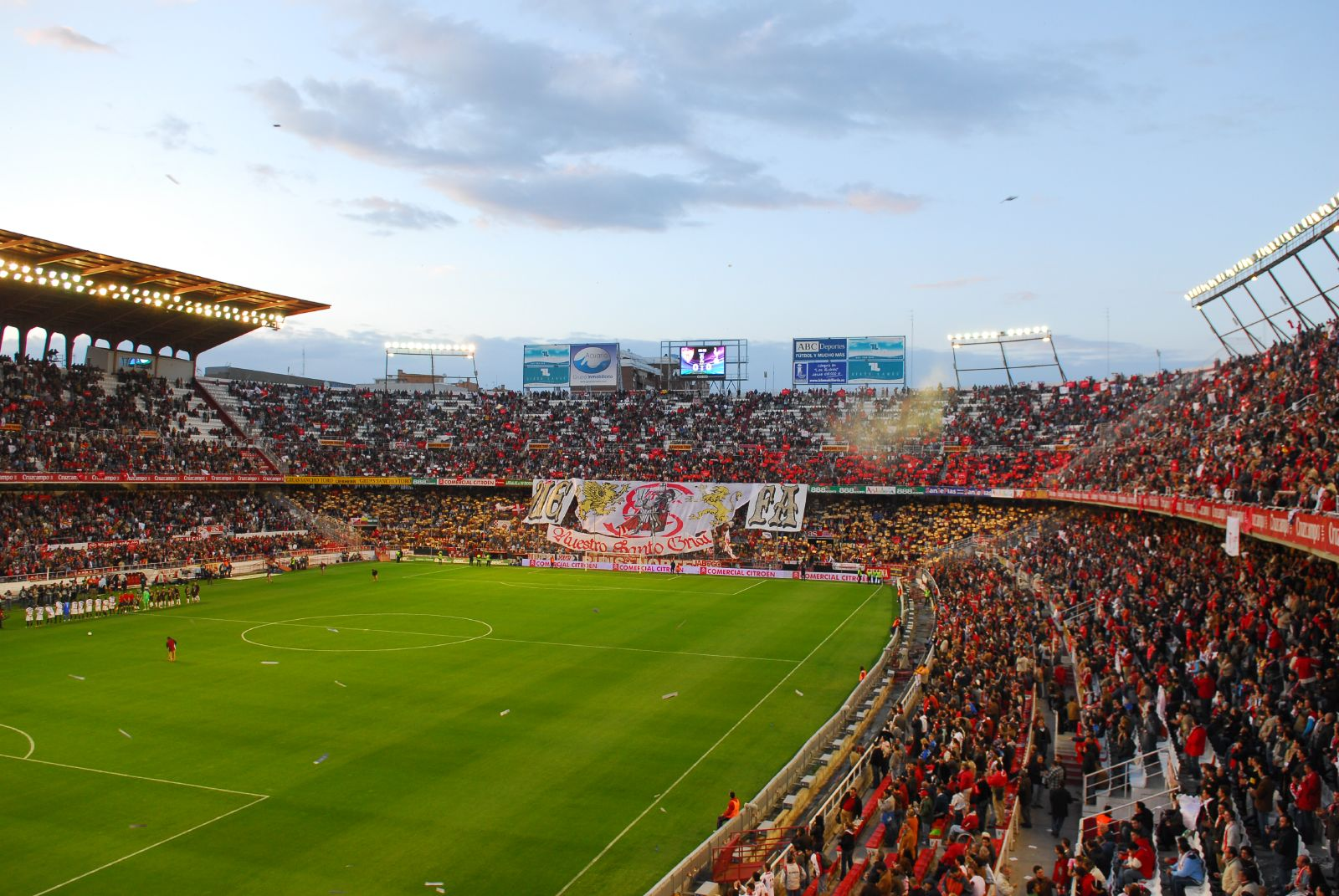

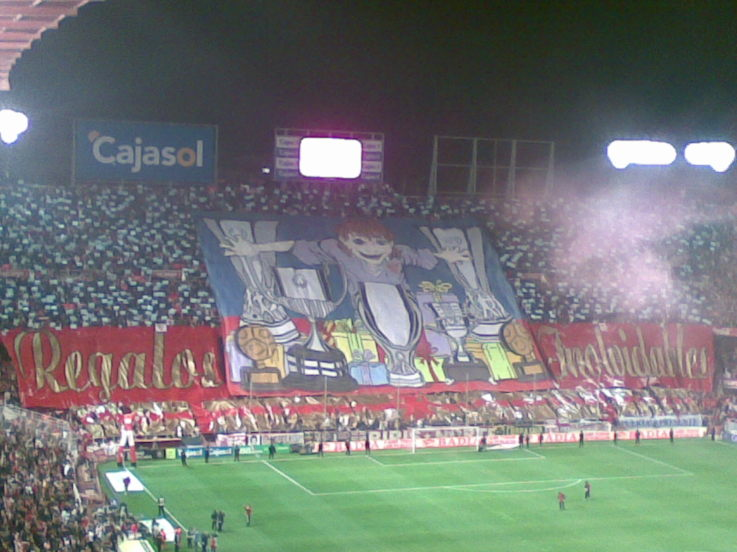

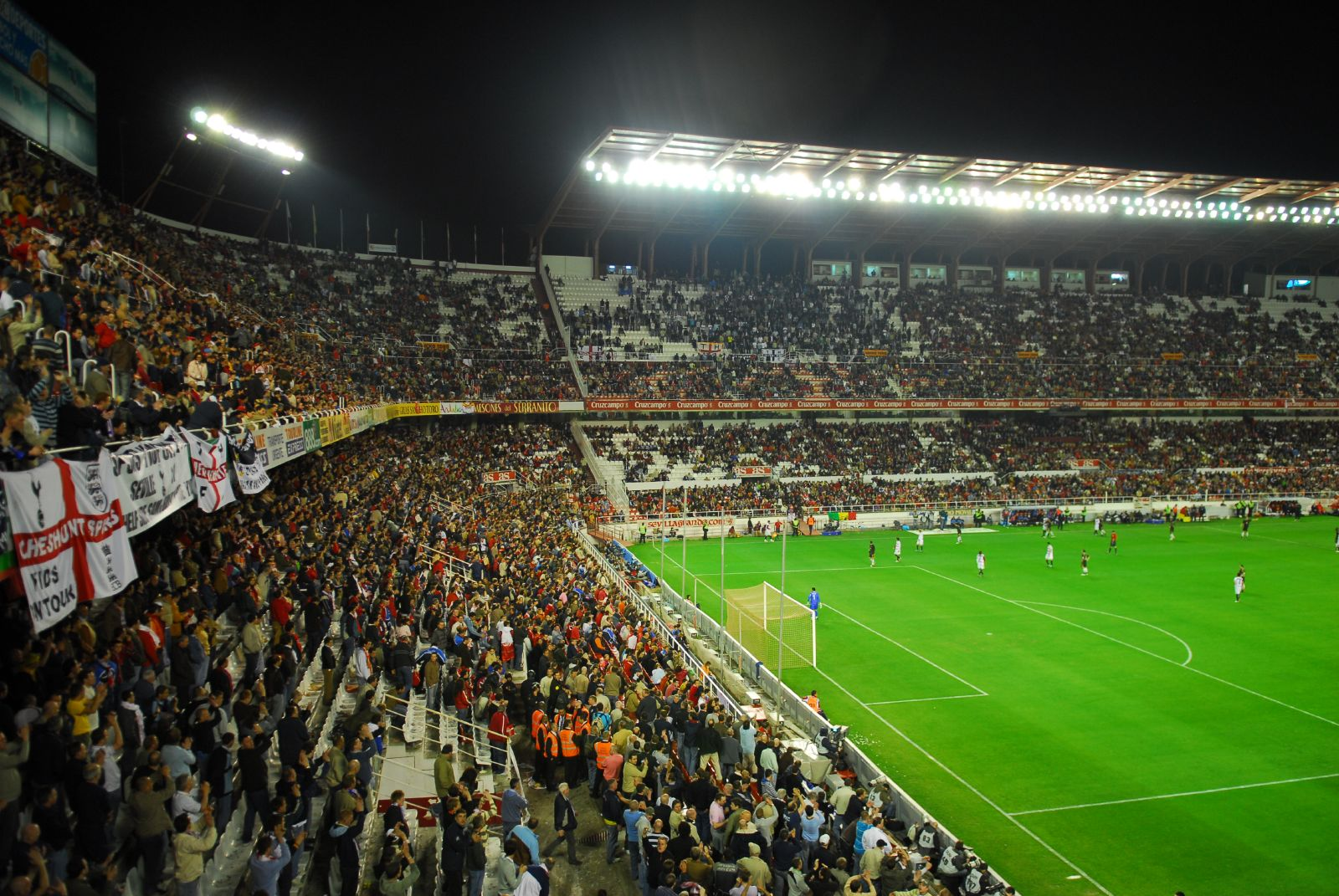

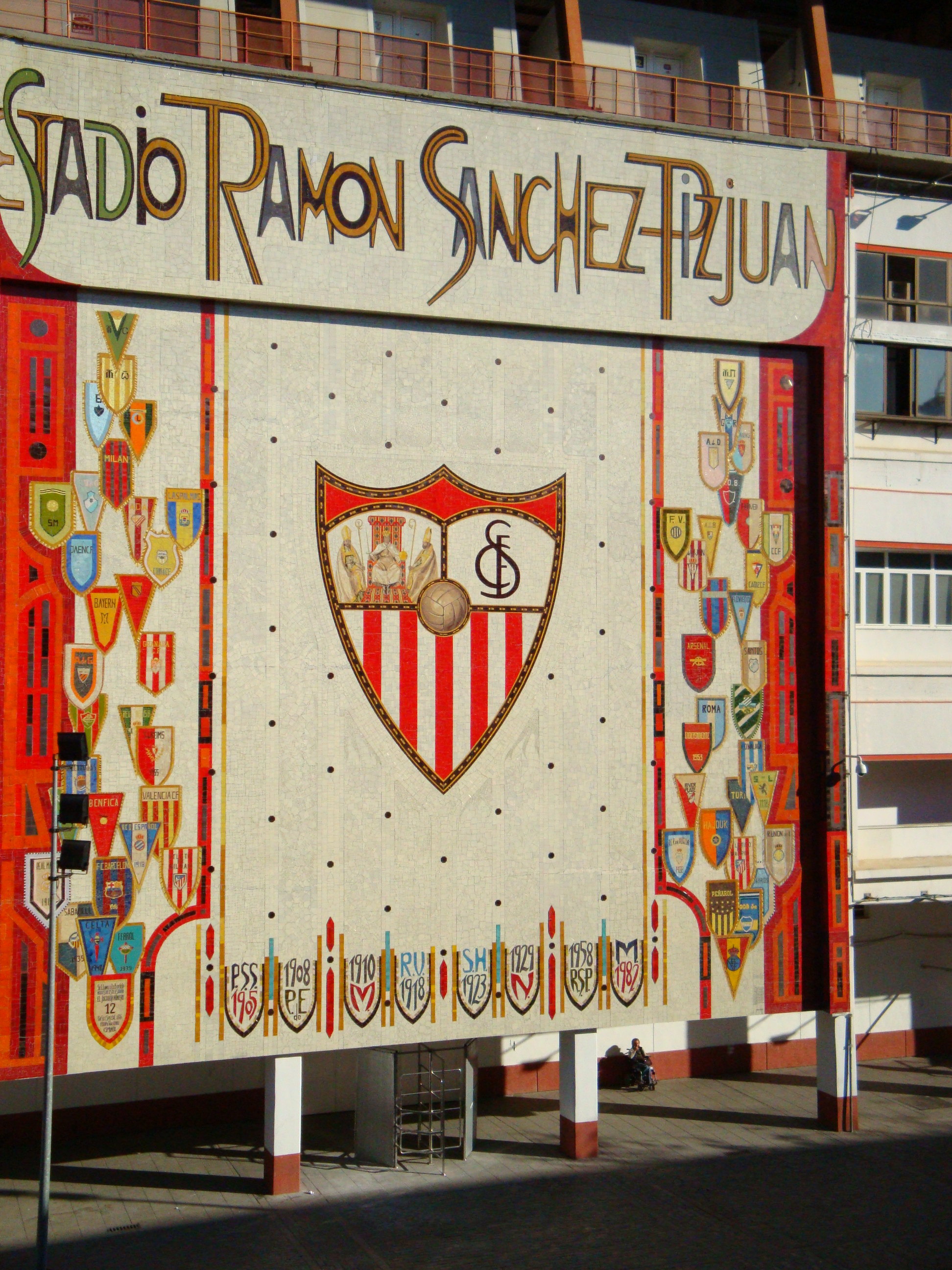

Preceded by Heysel Stadium; Brussels	European Cup; Final venue 1986	Succeeded by Praterstadion; Vienna
Preceded by Stadion Gdańsk; Gdańsk	UEFA Europa League; Final venue 2022	Succeeded by Puskás Aréna; Budapest
