= 1986 European Cup final =

- Match programme cover
- Event: 1985–86 European Cup
Barcelona	Steaua București
(Spain)	(Romania)
0	0
- After extra time Steaua București won 2–0 on penalties
- Date: 7 May 1986
- Venue: Ramón Sánchez Pizjuán, Seville
- Referee: Michel Vautrot (France)
- Attendance: 70,000

The 1986 European Cup final was a football match played at the Ramón Sánchez Pizjuán Stadium, Seville, Spain, on 7 May 1986 to determine the champions of that season's European Cup. Steaua București of Romania defeated Barcelona of Spain in a shootout, with keeper Helmut Duckadam saving all 4 shots. It was the first European Cup final to finish goalless and remains Steaua's only European Cup triumph, and the first of only two won by an Eastern European club.

== Route to the final ==
(Spain) Barcelona				Round	(Romania) Steaua București			
Opponent	Agg.	1st leg	2nd leg		Opponent	Agg.	1st leg	2nd leg
(Czechoslovakia) Sparta Prague	2–2 (a)	2–1 (A)	0–1 (H)	First round	(Denmark) Vejle	5–2	1–1 (A)	4–1 (H)
(Portugal) Porto	3–3 (a)	2–0 (H)	1–3 (A)	Second round	(Hungary) Budapest Honvéd	4–2	0–1 (A)	4–1 (H)
(Italy) Juventus	2–1	1–0 (H)	1–1 (A)	Quarter-finals	(Finland) Kuusysi	1–0	0–0 (H)	1–0 (A)
(Sweden) IFK Göteborg	3–3 (5–4 p)	0–3 (A)	3–0 (H)	Semi-finals	(Belgium) Anderlecht	3–1	0–1 (A)	3–0 (H)

== Match details ==
7 May 1986
20:15 CEST

Barcelona (Spain)	0–0 (a.e.t.)	(Romania) Steaua București
	Report
Penalties
Alexanko (penalty missed); Pedraza (penalty missed); Pichi (penalty missed); Marcos (penalty missed)	0–2	(penalty missed) Majearu; (penalty missed) Bölöni; (penalty scored) Lăcătuș; (penalty scored) Balint

Ramón Sánchez Pizjuán, Seville
Attendance: 70,000
Referee: Michel Vautrot (France)

Barcelona	Steaua București

GK	1	(Spain) Urruti
RB	2	(Spain) Gerardo
CB	3	(Spain) Migueli
LB	4	(Spain) Julio Alberto	(yellow card) 23'
CM	5	(Spain) Víctor Muñoz
CB	6	(Spain) José Ramón Alexanko (c)
CF	7	(Spain) Lobo Carrasco	(yellow card) 21'
CM	8	(West Germany) Bernd Schuster	(substituted off) 85'
RM	9	(Spain) Ángel Pedraza
CF	10	(Scotland) Steve Archibald	(substituted off) 100'
LM	11	(Spain) Marcos Alonso
Substitutes:
MF	14	(Spain) Josep Moratalla	(substituted on) 85'
FW	16	(Spain) Pichi Alonso	(substituted on) 100'
Manager:
(England) Terry Venables

GK	1	(Romania) Helmut Duckadam
RB	2	(Romania) Ștefan Iovan (c)
LB	3	(Romania) Ilie Bărbulescu	(yellow card) 107'
CB	4	(Romania) Adrian Bumbescu	(yellow card) 21'
CM	5	(Romania) Lucian Bălan	(substituted off) 72'
CB	6	(Romania) Miodrag Belodedici
SS	7	(Romania) Marius Lăcătuș	(yellow card) 26'
RM	8	(Romania) Mihail Majearu
CF	9	(Romania) Victor Pițurcă	(substituted off) 111'
LM	10	(Romania) Gabi Balint
CM	11	(Romania) László Bölöni	(yellow card) 31'
Substitutes:
FW	13	(Romania) Anghel Iordănescu	(substituted on) 72'
FW	16	(Romania) Marin Radu	(substituted on) 111'
Manager:
(Romania) Emerich Jenei

== See also ==
- 1985–86 FC Barcelona season
- 1986 UEFA Cup final
- 1986 European Cup Winners' Cup final
- 1986 European Super Cup
- 1986 Intercontinental Cup
- FC Barcelona in international football
- Steaua București in European football
