= 17th GCC Club Championship =

2000 GCC Club Championship
Tournament details
- Host country: Qatar
- Dates: 19 - 30 January
- Teams: 6 (from AFC/UAFA confederations)

Final positions
- Champions: (Kuwait) Qadsia SC (1st title)
- Runners-up: (Saudi Arabia) Al Hilal SC

The 17th GCC Club Championship (Arabic: بطولة الأنديـة الخليجية أبطال الدوري) was the seventeenth edition of the GCC Club Championship for clubs of the Gulf Cooperation Council nations. It started on 19 January and finished with the final round on 30 January 2000, and all the matches were played in Doha, Qatar. Qadsia SC won the title for the First time in their history.

== Results ==
Team	Pts	Pld	W	D	L	GF	GA	GD
(Kuwait) Qadsia SC	13	5	4	1	0	10	1	+9
(Saudi Arabia) Al Hilal SC	11	5	3	2	0	12	2	+10
(Bahrain) Al-Muharraq SC	7	5	2	1	2	8	11	-3
(Oman) Al-Nasr SC	5	5	1	2	2	4	7	-3
(Qatar) Al-Gharafa	4	5	1	1	3	4	8	-4
(United Arab Emirates) Al-Ahli	1	5	0	1	4	3	12	-9

=== Round 1 ===
19 January 2000	Qadsia SC (Kuwait)	2–0	(Qatar) Al-Gharafa

20 January 2000	Al-Ahli (United Arab Emirates)	1-1	(Oman) Al-Nasr SC

20 January 2000	Al Hilal SC (Saudi Arabia)	4-1	(Bahrain) Al-Muharraq SC

=== Round 2 ===
22 January 2000	Al-Gharafa (Qatar)	2–3	(Bahrain) Al-Muharraq SC

22 January 2000	Qadsia SC (Kuwait)	2-0	(Oman) Al-Nasr SC

23 January 2000	Al Hilal SC (Saudi Arabia)	4-0	(United Arab Emirates) Al-Ahli

=== Round 3 ===
24 January 2000	Qadsia SC (Kuwait)	4-1	(Bahrain) Al-Muharraq SC

25 January 2000	Al-Ahli (United Arab Emirates)	1–2	(Qatar) Al-Gharafa

25 January 2000	Al-Nasr SC (Oman)	1-4	(Saudi Arabia) Al Hilal SC

=== Round 4 ===
27 January 2000	Al-Nasr SC (Oman)	2-0	(Qatar) Al-Gharafa

27 January 2000	Al-Muharraq SC (Bahrain)	3–1	(United Arab Emirates) Al-Ahli

28 January 2000	Qadsia SC (Kuwait)	0–0	(Saudi Arabia) Al Hilal SC

=== Round 5 ===
29 January 2000	Al-Muharraq SC (Bahrain)	0–0	(Oman) Al-Nasr SC

30 January 2000	Al-Gharafa (Qatar)	0-0	(Saudi Arabia) Al Hilal SC

30 January 2000	Al-Ahli (United Arab Emirates)	0–2	Qadsia SC (Kuwait)
