= Stadionul Municipal (Brașov, old) =

Multi-use stadium in Brașov, Romania

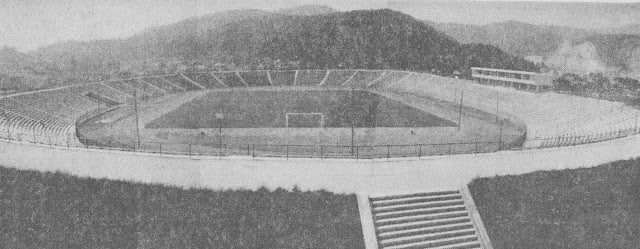
- Interactive map of Stadionul Municipal
- Location: Braşov, Romania
- Coordinates: 45°39′27″N 25°34′15″E
- Capacity: 30,000
- Surface: Grass

Construction
- Closed: 2008
- Demolished: 2008

Municipal Stadium was a multi-use stadium next to the Castra of Brașov in Braşov, Romania. It was used mostly for football matches, different teams from Braşov having played on it. The stadium had a capacity of 30,000 people.

== Aftermath ==
Following the demolition, the site remained mostly vacant after plans to rapidly construct a new stadium by 2010 fell through due to insufficient funding. In the interim, the land was occasionally leased for circus performances. In 2023, construction of a new multifunctional arena began in the southern section of the former stadium, while a new mini park was started to be developed in the northern part of the site. Commercial development began in the northwestern section in 2024.
