= Salem Suroor =

Saudi Arabian footballer

Personal information
- Full name: Salem Suroor Al-Alawi
- Date of birth: 21 August 1972 (age 54)
- Place of birth: Riyadh, Saudi Arabia
- Height: 1.68 m (5 ft 6 in)
- Position: Midfielder

Senior career*
Years	Team	Apps	(Gls)
1988–2003	Al-Shabab	222	(17)

International career
1989	Saudi Arabia U-17	6	(0)
1992–1997	Saudi Arabia	19	(0)
Medal record
Representing Saudi Arabia
Men's football
FIFA U-17 World Cup
Winner	1989 Scotland
- * Club domestic league appearances and goals

Salem Suroor Al-Alawi is a former Saudi Arabian footballer who played as a midfielder for the Saudi Arabia national team and Al-Shabab.
