= 1988–89 Cupa României =

Tournament details
- Country: Romania

Final positions
- Champions: Steaua București
- Runners-up: Dinamo București

The 1988–89 Cupa României was the 51st edition of Romania's most prestigious football cup competition.

The title was won by Steaua București against Dinamo București.

== Format ==
The competition is an annual knockout tournament.

First round proper matches are played on the ground of the lowest ranked team, then from the second round proper the matches are played on a neutral location.

If a match is drawn after 90 minutes, the game goes in extra time, if the scored is still tight after 120 minutes, then the winner will be established at penalty kicks.

From the first edition, the teams from Divizia A entered in competition in sixteen finals, rule which remained till today.

== First round proper ==
Team 1	Score	Team 2
12 February 1989
Explorări Câmpulung Moldovenesc (Div. B)	2–5	(Div. A) Victoria București
22 February 1989
Progresul Medgidia (Div. C)	1–2	(Div. A) Dinamo București
Pandurii Târgu Jiu (Div. B)	0–3	(Div. A) Steaua București
26 February 1989
Gloria Bistrița (Div. B)	5–0	(Div. A) ASA 1962 Târgu Mureș
Automatica București (Div. C)	1–1 (a.e.t.)(5–6 p)	(Div. A) FCM Brașov
Gloria Buzău (Div. B)	1–0 (a.e.t.)	(Div. A) Oțelul Galați
Farul Constanța (Div. A)	1–0	(Div. A) Corvinul Hunedoara
Mureşul Deva (Div. C)	0–1	(Div. A) Bihor Oradea
Steaua Mecanică Huşi (Div. C)	3–4	(Div. A) Flacăra Moreni
Gaz Metan Mediaș (Div. B)	0–3	(Div. A) SC Bacău
Rova Roşiori (Div. C)	0–2	(Div. A) Rapid București
Inter Sibiu (Div. A)	2–0	(Div. A) Olt Scornicești
Unirea Slobozia (Div. C)	1–0	(Div. A) Universitatea Cluj
CFR Timișoara (Div. B)	2–0	(Div. A) Argeş Piteşti
Armătura Zalău (Div. B)	4–1	(Div. A) Universitatea Craiova
2 March 1989
Electromureş Târgu Mureş (Div. B)	1–1 (a.e.t.)(8–7 p)	(Div. A) Sportul Studenţesc București

== Second round proper ==
Team 1	Score	Team 2
8 June 1989
Inter Sibiu	0–1	Dinamo București
Gloria Buzău	3–1	Farul Constanța
Flacăra Moreni	2–3	Victoria București
Armătura Zalău	1–2	Gloria Bistrița
CFR Timișoara	1–2	Rapid București
FCM Brașov	3–6	Steaua București
Electromureş Târgu Mureş	2–2 (a.e.t.)(2–4 p)	SC Bacău
Unirea Slobozia	2–0	Bihor Oradea

== Quarter-finals ==
Team 1	Score	Team 2
22 June 1989
Victoria București	4–2	Gloria Bistrița
Rapid București	3–0	Gloria Buzău
Dinamo București	5–1	SC Bacău
Steaua București	3–1	Unirea Slobozia

== Semi-finals ==
Team 1	Score	Team 2
25 June 1989
Dinamo București	2–0	Victoria București
Steaua București	3–2	Rapid București

== Final ==
29 June 1989
17:00 EET

Steaua București	1–0	Dinamo București
Hagi 67'	Report

Stadionul Municipal, Brașov
Attendance: 35,000
Referee: Dan Petrescu (Bucharest)
