= Mihail Majearu =

Romanian footballer

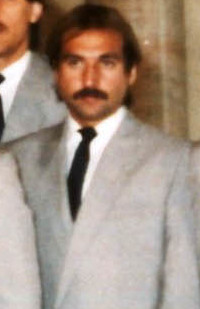
- Majearu in 1986

Personal information
- Date of birth: 15 July 1960 (age 66)
- Place of birth: Galaţi, Romania
- Height: 1.80 m (5 ft 11 in)
- Positions: Right-back; midfielder

Youth career
- FCM Galaţi

Senior career*
Years	Team	Apps	(Gls)
1979–1981	FCM Galaţi	52	(11)
1981–1988	Steaua București	198	(32)
1988–1990	Inter Sibiu	52	(14)
1990–1991	Panachaiki	17	(1)
1991–1993	Inter Sibiu	42	(13)
1993–1994	Gloria Bistriţa	22	(0)
1994–1995	Corvinul Hunedoara	10	(1)
1995–1996	CFR Timişoara	6	(0)
Total		399	(72)

International career
1987	Romania	1	(0)
- * Club domestic league appearances and goals

Mihail Majearu (born 15 July 1960 in Galaţi) is a Romanian former professional footballer who played as a right-back or midfielder. He played for Steaua București and was part of their European Cup victory in 1986, despite missing his penalty in the shootout in the final. He also played for FCM Galaţi, FC Inter Sibiu, Panachaiki, Gloria Bistriţa, Corvinul Hunedoara and CFR Timişoara. He was capped once by Romania.

On 25 March 2008 he was decorated by the president of Romania, Traian Băsescu with Ordinul "Meritul Sportiv" – (The Order of "Merit in Sport") class II for his part in winning the 1986 European Cup Final.

Majearu is currently in charge with a youth team at Steaua București.

== Honours ==
Steaua București

- Romanian Championship: 1984–85, 1985–86, 1986–87, 1987–88
- Romanian Cup: 1984–85, 1986–87, 1987–88
- European Cup: 1985–86
- European Super Cup: 1986

Gloria Bistrița

- Romanian Cup: 1993–94
