= Castra of Brașov =

Fort in the Roman province of Dacia

- Castra of/from Șprenghi
- Location within Romania
- 45.6606°N 25.5754°E
- Location: Șprenghi Hill, Brașov, Brașov, Romania

Site notes
- Elevation: 555 m (1,821 ft)
- Condition: Disappeared

The Castra of Brașov was a fort in the Roman province of Dacia near Brașov, Romania, on Șprenghi Hill.

== See also ==
- List of castra
