= 1983–84 Cupa României =

Tournament details
- Country: Romania

Final positions
- Champions: Dinamo București
- Runners-up: Steaua București

The 1983–84 Cupa României was the 46th edition of Romania's most prestigious football cup competition.

The title was won by Dinamo București against Steaua București.

== Format ==
The competition is an annual knockout tournament.

First round proper matches are played on the ground of the lowest ranked team, then from the second round proper the matches are played on a neutral location.

If a match is drawn after 90 minutes, the game goes in extra time, if the scored is still tight after 120 minutes, then the winner will be established at penalty kicks.

From the first edition, the teams from Divizia A entered in competition in sixteen finals, rule which remained till today.

== First round proper ==
Team 1	Score	Team 2
7 December 1983
UTA Arad (Div. B)	1–0	(Div. A) Politehnica Iași
Minerul Baraolt (Div. C)	0–3	(Div. A) Dunărea CSU Galați
Metalul Bocşa (Div. C)	0–1	(Div. A) ASA 1962 Târgu Mureș
Dinamo Victoria București (Div. B)	1–2	(Div. A) SC Bacău
Sportul Muncitoresc Caracal (Div. C)	0–1	(Div. A) Corvinul Hunedoara
Poiana Câmpina (Div. C)	0–2	(Div. A) Chimia Râmnicu Vâlcea
Viitorul Gheorgheni (Div. C)	3–1	(Div. A) FC Baia Mare
Mureşul Luduş (Div. C)	0–0 (a.e.t.)(1-3 p)	(Div. A) Sportul Studenţesc București
Cimentul Medgidia (Div. C)	0–4	(Div. A) Steaua București
Metalul Rădăuţi (Div. C)	1–3	(Div. A) Argeş Piteşti
Precizia Săcele (Div. C)	0–1	(Div. A) Rapid București
Victoria Tecuci (Div. C)	0–1	(Div. A) Petrolul Ploiești
CS Târgovişte (Div. A)	1–3	(Div. A) Olt Scornicești
Armătura Zalău (Div. B)	0–1	(Div. A) Jiul Petroşani
12 February 1984
Petrolul Moineşti (Div. C)	1–4	(Div. A) Dinamo București
23 February 1984
Universitatea Craiova (Div. A)	2–1	(Div. A) Bihor Oradea

== Second round proper ==
Team 1	Score	Team 2
3 March 1984
Petrolul Ploiești	1–0	Dunărea CSU Galați
Argeş Piteşti	2–1	UTA Arad
Steaua București	1–0 (a.e.t.)	SC Bacău
Jiul Petroşani	1–2 (a.e.t.)	Corvinul Hunedoara
Viitorul Gheorgheni	0–2	ASA 1962 Târgu Mureș
Sportul Studenţesc București	2–2 (a.e.t.)(5-4 p)	Chimia Râmnicu Vâlcea
Olt Scornicești	0–2	Dinamo București
Rapid București	2–1	Universitatea Craiova

== Quarter-finals ==
Team 1	Score	Team 2
20 March 1984
Corvinul Hunedoara	3–1 (a.e.t.)	Rapid București
Steaua București	2–0	Argeş Piteşti
Sportul Studenţesc București	3–1	ASA 1962 Târgu Mureș
18 April 1984
Dinamo București	4–2	Petrolul Ploiești

== Semi-finals ==
Team 1	Score	Team 2
11 May 1984
Sportul Studenţesc București	0–2	Steaua București
Dinamo București	2–0	Corvinul Hunedoara

== Final ==
22 June 1984
17:00 EET

Dinamo București	2–1	Steaua București
Custov 45'; Orac 53'	Report	Lăcătuș 10'

23 August, Bucharest
Attendance: 60,000
Referee: Dan Petrescu (Bucharest)

Cupa României 1983–84 winners

5th title
