= 1984–85 Cupa României =

Tournament details
- Country: Romania

Final positions
- Champions: Steaua București
- Runners-up: Universitatea Craiova

The 1984–85 Cupa României was the 47th edition of Romania's most prestigious football cup competition.

The title was won by Steaua București against Universitatea Craiova.

== Format ==
The competition is an annual knockout tournament.

First round proper matches are played on the ground of the lowest ranked team, then from the second round proper the matches are played on a neutral location.

If a match is drawn after 90 minutes, the game goes in extra time, if the scored is still tight after 120 minutes, then the winner will be established at penalty kicks.

From the first edition, the teams from Divizia A entered in competition in sixteen finals, rule which remained till today.

== First round proper ==
Team 1	Score	Team 2
29 November 1984
Dinamo Victoria București (Div. B)	3–1	(Div. A) Gloria Buzău
Sportul Muncitoresc Caracal (Div. C)	0–1 (a.e.t.)	(Div. A) Rapid București
Steaua CFR Cluj (Div. C)	1–6	(Div. A) Steaua București
Viitorul Drăgăşani (Div. C)	0–3	(Div. A) SC Bacău
Nitramonia Făgăraș (Div. C)	3–5	(Div. A) Corvinul Hunedoara
Unirea Dinamo Focșani (Div. B)	0–2	(Div. A) Sportul Studenţesc București
Dunărea CSU Galați (Div. B)	2–0	(Div. A) ASA 1962 Târgu Mureș
Cimentul Medgidia (Div. C)	1–1 (a.e.t.)(3-4 p)	(Div. A) FCM Brașov
AS Mizil (Div. B)	3–2 (a.e.t.)	(Div. A) Olt Scornicești
Minerul Oraviţa (Div. C)	1–3	(Div. A) Politehnica Iași
Ceahlăul Piatra Neamț (Div. B)	0–1	(Div. A) FC Baia Mare
Șurianul Sebeș (Div. D)	1–6	(Div. A) Dinamo București
CIL Mecanica Sighet (Div. C)	2–0	(Div. A) Bihor Oradea
Chimia Râmnicu Vâlcea (Div. A)	2–0	(Div. A) Jiul Petroșani
15 December 1984
Argeş Piteşti (Div. A)	2–1	(Div. A) Politehnica Timișoara
16 February 1985
CS Târgovişte (Div. B)	0–3 (forfait)	(Div. A) Universitatea Craiova ‡

Notes:

- ‡ CS Târgovişte lost the match because players didn't have the identification cards.

== Second round proper ==
Team 1	Score	Team 2
20 February 1985
Corvinul Hunedoara	1–2	Dinamo București
FCM Brașov	0–1	Universitatea Craiova
Argeş Piteşti	1–2	Politehnica Iași
CIL Mecanica Sighetu Marmației	1–0	Dinamo Victoria București
Dunărea CSU Galați	0–2	Steaua București
Rapid București	0–1	Chimia Râmnicu Vâlcea
AS Mizil	1–1 (a.e.t.)(3-2 p)	SC Bacău
FC Baia Mare	1–0	Sportul Studenţesc București

== Quarter-finals ==
Team 1	Score	Team 2
27 February 1985
Politehnica Iași	2–0	CIL Mecanica Sighetu Marmației
Steaua București	1–0	FC Baia Mare
Universitatea Craiova	3–1 (a.e.t.)	AS Mizil
Dinamo București	3–1	Chimia Râmnicu Vâlcea

== Semi-finals ==
Team 1	Score	Team 2
12 June 1985
Steaua București	5–0	Dinamo București
Universitatea Craiova	2–0	Politehnica Iași

== Final ==
23 June 1985
17:30 EET

Steaua București	2–1	Universitatea Craiova
Lăcătuș 10'; Pițurcă 73'	Report	Cârțu 69'

23 August, Bucharest
Attendance: 60,000
Referee: Dan Petrescu (Bucharest)
