= List of FC Petrolul Ploiești players =

Below is a list of notable footballers who have played for Petrolul Ploiești. The list includes players who have made 100 or more appearances in the Romanian First Division for the club. Appearances and goals are counted only for league matches in the top tier of Romanian football. The players are listed according to the period in which they represented the club, reflecting their contribution to Petrolul’s history and achievements over the years.

== Key to positions ==
GK	Goalkeeper	RB	Right back	RW	Right winger	DF	Defender
IF	Inside forward	LB	Left back	LW	Left winger	CB	Centre back
FW	Forward	FB	Full back	W	Winger	MF	Midfielder
ST	Striker	WH	Wing half	AM	Attacking midfielder	CM	Central midfielder

== Notable players ==
Petrolul players with over 100 appearances
Player	Nationality	Position	Petrolul career	Appearances	Goals	Ref.						
Player	Nationality	Position	Petrolul career	Appearances	Goals	Ref.	Octavian Grigore	Romania	DF	1983–2000	442	52
Gheorghe Pahonțu	Romania	DF	1952–1969	298	5							
Mircea Dridea	Romania	FW	1956–1971	274	141							
Mihai Ionescu	Romania	GK	1961–1973	256	0							
Bujorel Mocanu	Romania	MF	1984–1994	223	19							
Octavian Dincuță	Romania	MF	1964–1974	216	36							
Sandu Pitulice	Romania	DF	1986–1994	211	3							
Gheorghe Florea	Romania	DF	1957–1970	211	0							
Mihai Mocanu	Romania	LB	1964–1972	201	6							
Eduard Iuhas	Romania	MF	1964–1972	199	10							
Alexandru Badea	Romania	FW	1960–1968	196	52							
Gheorghe Grozav	Romania	FW	2012–2026	189	46							
Cristian Zmoleanu	Romania	MF	1993–1998	171	40							
Valeriu Răchită	Romania	CB	1991–1997	169	18							
Daniel Chiriță	Romania	RB	1993–1998	165	1							
Decu Crângașu	Romania	MF	1969–1986	161	18							
Vasile Sfetcu	Romania	GK	1954–1969	161	0							
Gheorghe Gruber	Romania	DF	1969–1974	160	0							
Petre Butufei	Romania	DF	1978–1987	158	10							
Ștefan Preda	Romania	GK	1993–1998	154	0							
Nicolae Ionescu	Romania	CM	1993–1998	154	0							
Adrian Gheorghe Bălăceanu	Romania	DF	1993–1998	148	12							
Constantin Tabarcea	Romania	MF	1956–1963	145	16							
Daniel Costescu	Romania	FW	1999–2004	142	30							
Ștefan Matei	Romania	MF	1990–1994	141	23							
Nicolae Ruse	Romania	DF	1988–1994	139	5							
Dumitru Munteanu	Romania	AM	1956–1966	136	19							
Marcel Marin	Romania	LW	1955–1964	136	11							
Gheorghe Leahu	Romania	LB	1993–1998	136	1							
Adrian Toader	Romania	FW	1992–2000	134	22							
Dumitru Jipa	Romania	GK	1983–1998	134	0							
Marcel Catinca	Romania	FW	1984–1993	133	29							
Constantin Ștefan	Romania	DF	1984–1992	133	1							
Gheorghe Grozea	Romania	FW	1968–1973	132	32							
Alexandru Fronea	Romania	CM	1958–1965	132	1							
Dinu Todoran	Romania	MF	1998–2004	129	21							
Camil Oprișan	Romania	MF	1964–1973	127	8							
Daniel Baștină	Romania	CM	1994–1999	127	8							

== Sources ==
- Ionescu, Romeo (2019). Petrolul Ploiești – Formațiile din meciurile oficiale de fotbal 1972–2019. Ploiești: Self-published.
- "Romanian Soccer". Archived from the original on 25 September 2025.
- "Labtof.ro". Archived from the original on 7 September 2025.
