= Marcel Marin =

Romanian footballer

Personal information
- Date of birth: 2 May 1933
- Place of birth: Ploiești, Romania
- Date of death: 17 March 1996 (aged 62)
- Positions: Forward; midfielder

Youth career
- 1943–1950: Flacăra Ploiești

Senior career*
Years	Team	Apps	(Gls)
1951	Concordia Ploiești		
1952–1954	Metalul Plopeni		
1955	Flacăra Ploiești	21	(6)
1956–1957	CCA București (Note: The 1957 championship called Cupa Primăverii is unofficial, so the appearances and goals scored at that competition for CCA București are not official.)	4	(2)
1957–1958	UTA Arad	16	(2)
1958–1964	Petrolul Ploiești	115	(5)
1964–1968	Universitatea Craiova	84	(0)
Total		240	(15)

International career
1963–1967	Romania B	2	(0)
- * Club domestic league appearances and goals

Marcel Marin (2 May 1933 – 17 March 1996) was a Romanian footballer who played as a forward and midfielder.

== Club career ==
Marin was born on 2 May 1933 in Ploiești, Romania and began playing junior-level football at local club Flacăra. In 1951, he went to play for Concordia Ploiești before moving one year later to Metalul Plopeni. He returned to Flacăra and made his Divizia A debut on 13 March 1955 under coach Ilie Oană in a 1–1 draw against Flamura Roșie Arad. Afterwards, Marin joined CCA București, where he played four matches and scored two goals under coach Ștefan Dobay in the 1956 season, as the team won the championship. For the 1957–58 season, he went to play for UTA Arad. He then moved to Petrolul Ploiești, helping the team win the 1958–59 title by playing nine matches and scoring three goals under Oană. The team also won the 1963 Cupa României final, with Marin playing the entire match under Oană in the 6–1 win over Siderurgistul Galați. During his stint with Petrolul, Marin played eight matches in European competitions (including five matches in the Inter-Cities Fairs Cup). Notably, he helped the team reach the 1962–63 Inter-Cities Fairs Cup quarter-finals, where they were defeated by Ferencváros. In 1964, Marin joined Universitatea Craiova. There, he made his last Divizia A appearance on 21 April 1968 in a 1–0 away loss to Petrolul, totaling 240 matches with 17 goals in the competition.

== International career ==
Between 1963 and 1967, Marin played two matches for Romania B, helping secure draws against Yugoslavia and Poland.

== Death ==
Marin died on 17 March 1996 at the age of 62.

== Honours ==
CCA București

- Divizia A: 1956

Petrolul Ploiești

- Divizia A: 1958–59
- Cupa României: 1962–63
