= 1963 Cupa României final =

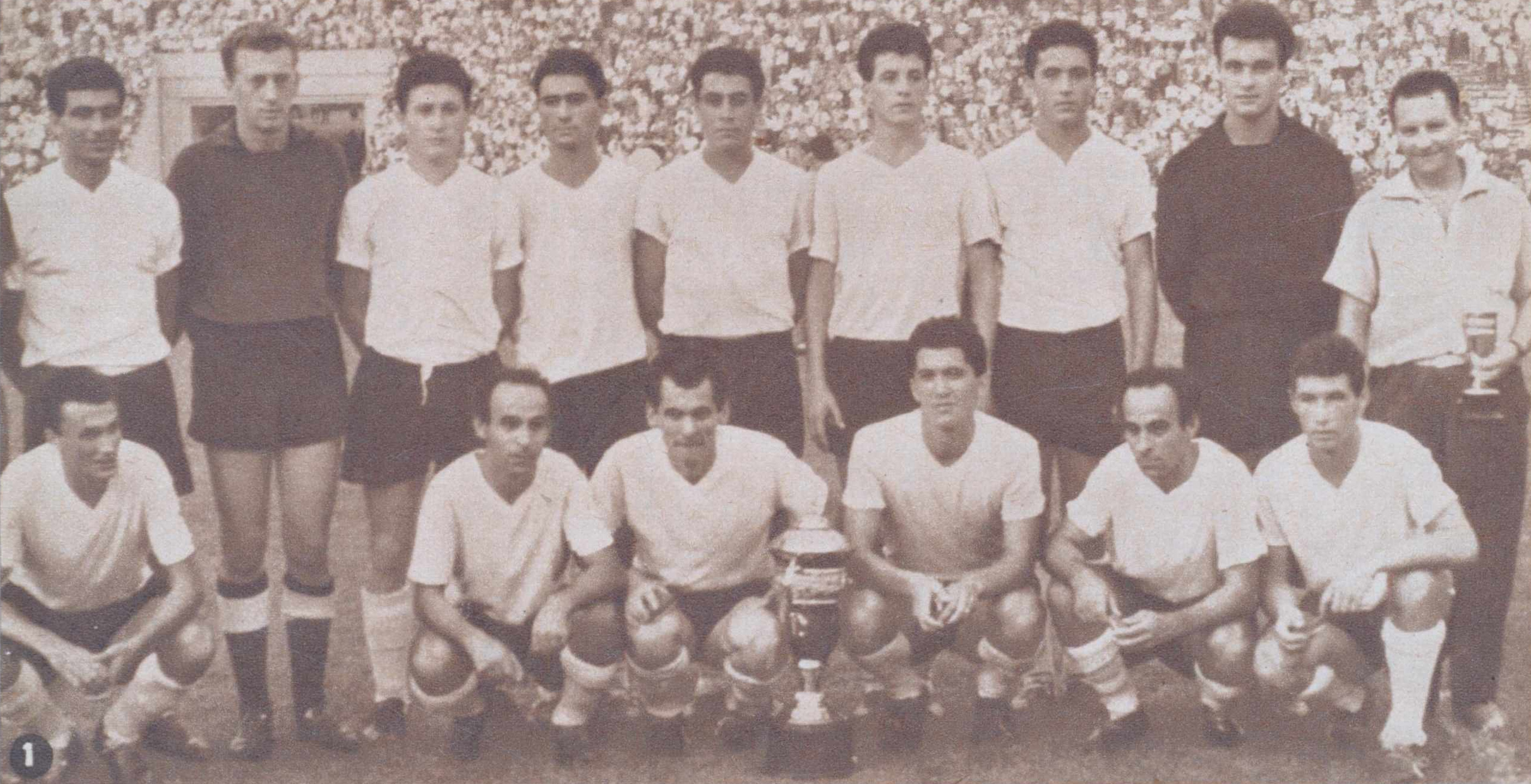
- Petrolul Ploiești posing with the trophy
- Event: 1962–63 Cupa României
Petrolul Ploiești	Siderurgistul Galați
6	1
- Date: 21 July 1963
- Venue: 23 August, Bucharest
- Referee: Mircea Cruţescu (Bucharest)
- Attendance: 45,000

The 1963 Cupa României final was the 25th final of Romania's most prestigious football cup competition. It was disputed between Petrolul Ploiești and Siderurgistul Galați, and was won by Petrolul Ploiești after a game with 7 goals. It was the 1st cup for Petrolul Ploiești. One week ago in a championship match against Dinamo Bacău, Petrolul's player Constantin Tabarcea died on the field. In his memory before the Cup final, at the team photo, the place from the down row in front of goalkeeper Mihai Ionescu was left free.

Siderurgistul Galați was the eighth club representing Divizia B which reached the Romanian Cup final.

== Match details ==
21 July 1963
17:30 EET

Petrolul Ploiești	6–1	Siderurgistul Galați
Munteanu 14'; Dridea 30', 69', 77'; Moldoveanu 35', 49'	Report	Zgardan 10'

23 August, Bucharest
Attendance: 45,000
Referee: Mircea Cruţescu (Bucharest)

GK	1	(Romania) Vasile Sfetcu (substituted off) 85'
DF	2	(Romania) Gheorghe Pahonțu (c)
DF	3	(Romania) Dumitru Nicolae
DF	4	(Romania) Gheorghe Florea (substituted off) 85'
MF	5	(Romania) Nicolae Ivan
MF	6	(Romania) Marcel Marin
FW	7	(Romania) Alexandru Badea
FW	8	(Romania) Dumitru Munteanu
FW	9	(Romania) Mircea Dridea
FW	10	(Romania) Anton Munteanu
FW	11	(Romania) Constantin Moldoveanu
Substitutions:
GK	12	(Romania) Mihai Ionescu (substituted in) 85'
DF	13	(Romania) Alexandru Pal (substituted in) 85'
Manager:
(Romania) Ilie Oană

GK	1	(Romania) Victor Câmpeanu (substituted off) 53'
DF	2	(Romania) Ion Voicu
DF	3	(Romania) Constantin Coman
DF	4	(Romania) Cristian Stătescu
MF	5	(Romania) Petre Dragomir
MF	6	(Romania) Dumitru Oprea (substituted off) 69'
FW	7	(Romania) Gheorghe Militaru
FW	8	(Romania) Gheorghe Ion
FW	9	(Romania) Radu Matei
FW	10	(Romania) Adrian Zgardan
FW	11	(Romania) Zoltan David
Substitutions:
GK	12	(Romania) Emil Dan (substituted in) 53'
MF	13	(Romania) Traian Coman I (substituted in) 69'
Manager:
(Romania) Traian Tomescu

== See also ==
- List of Cupa României finals
