= Mihai Ionescu =

Romanian footballer

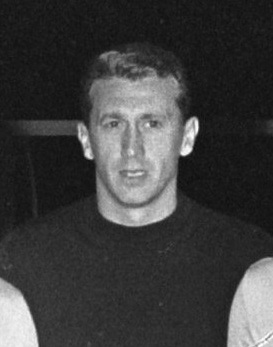
- Ionescu in 1966

Personal information
- Date of birth: 19 November 1936
- Place of birth: Ploiești, Romania
- Date of death: 19 January 2011 (aged 74)
- Place of death: Bucharest, Romania
- Position: Goalkeeper

Senior career*
Years	Team	Apps	(Gls)
1958–1960	Prahova Ploiești		
1960–1973	Petrolul Ploiești	256	(0)

International career
1965–1967	Romania	13	(0)

Managerial career
- 1975: Petrolul Ploiești (assistant)
- Metalul Filipeștii de Pădure
- * Club domestic league appearances and goals

Mihai Ionescu (19 November 1936 – 19 January 2011) was a Romanian footballer who played at both international and professional levels as a goalkeeper.

== Club career ==
Ionescu was born on 19 November 1936 Ploiești, Romania and spent his entire career playing for teams in his native town, first at Prahova from 1958 until 1960. Afterwards he joined Petrolul where he spent 13 seasons, making his Divizia A debut under coach Ilie Oană on 4 September 1960 in a 3–1 victory against Dinamo Bacău. Ionescu played for The Yellow Wolves in the 6–1 victory against Siderurgistul Galați in the 1963 Cupa României final when he was introduced by Oană in the 85th minute to replace Vasile Sfetcu. He won the 1965–66 Divizia A title, being used by coach Constantin Cernăianu in 26 games.

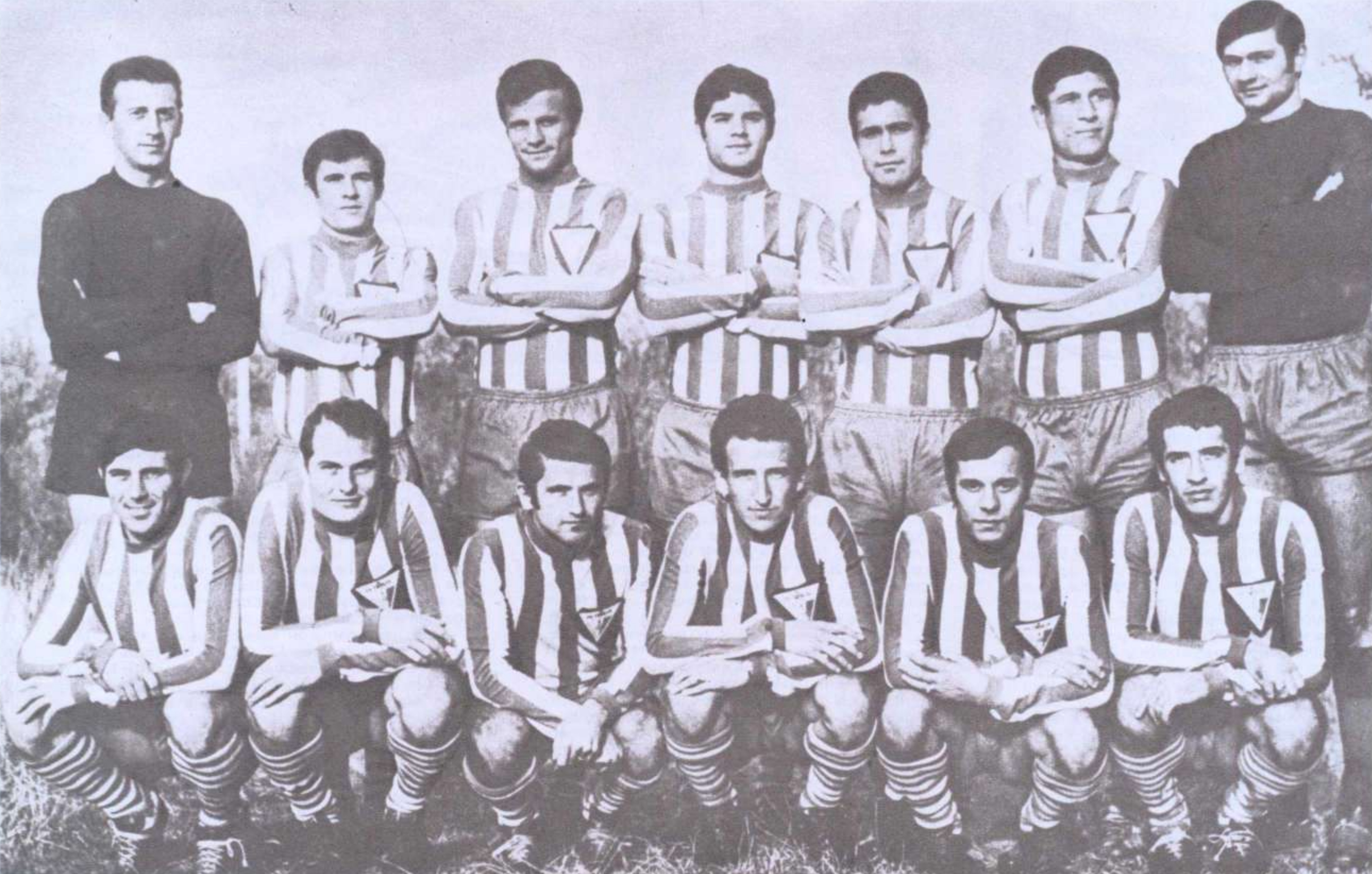
Ionescu (first from the left, back row) with Petrolul in 1970

He played two matches for Petrolul in the first round of the 1966–67 European Cup against Liverpool which included a 3–1 victory, but they did not manage to qualify to the next round. Ionescu also achieved individual recognition, being named the best goalkeeper from Romania by the Sportul newspaper in 1965 and 1966. He made his last Divizia A appearance, playing for Petrolul on 20 June 1973 in a 2–1 away loss to ASA Târgu Mureș, totaling 256 matches in the competition and nine games in European competitions (including six in the Inter-Cities Fairs Cup).

== International career ==
Ionescu played 13 games for Romania, making his debut on 19 September 1965 under coach Ilie Oană in a 3–1 away loss to Czechoslovakia in the 1966 World Cup qualifiers. His second game was in the same qualifiers, keeping a clean sheet in a 2–0 home victory against Portugal. He played four games in the Euro 1968 qualifiers, including his last appearance on 24 May 1967 in a 7–1 away loss to Switzerland.

== After retirement ==
After he ended his career, Ionescu worked as vice-president at Petrolul from 1973 until 1975, and also served as Mihai Mocanu's assistant coach at the team from April until July 1975. He was head coach at Metalul Filipeștii de Pădure and president for 10 years at AJF Prahova. In 2002, Ionescu was awarded the Honorary Citizen of the Ploiești Municipality title.

== Death ==
Ionescu died on 19 January 2011 at the age of 74, after undergoing an operation on the head a few days earlier at the Emergency Clinical Hospital in Bucharest.

== Honours ==
Petrolul Ploiești

- Divizia A: 1965–66
- Cupa României: 1962–63
