= 1956 Divizia B =

Divizia B
- Season: 1956
- Promoted: Recolta Târgu Mureș; Metalul Steagul Roșu
- Relegated: Progresul Satu Mare; Locomotiva Iași; Locomotiva Turnu Severin; Flamura Roșie Bacău

The 1956 Divizia B was the 17th season of the second tier of the Romanian football league system.

The format has been changed back to two series, one of them having 13 teams and the other one 14. At the end of the season the winners of the series promoted to Divizia A, the last two places from each series relegated to Divizia C. This was the seventh and the last season played in the spring-autumn system, a system imposed by the new leadership of the country which were in close ties with the Soviet Union.

== Team changes ==
=== To Divizia B ===
Promoted from District Championship

- —

Relegated from Divizia A

- Locomotiva Târgu Mureș
- Locomotiva Constanța
- Avântul Reghin

=== From Divizia B ===
Relegated to Divizia C

- Flamura Roșie Sfântu Gheorghe
- Flamura Roșie Cluj
- Flamura Roșie Buhuși
- Locomotiva Craiova
- Metalul Baia Mare
- Avântul Fălticeni
- Știința Craiova
- Metalul Oradea
- Dinamo Galați
- Metalul București
- Metalul 108 Cugir
- Locomotiva Galați
- Metalul Arad

Promoted to Divizia A

- Locomotiva GR București
- Progresul Oradea
- Dinamo Bacău

=== Renamed teams ===
Flacăra 1 Mai Ploiești was renamed as Energia 1 Mai Ploiești.

Flacăra Câmpina was renamed as Energia Câmpina.

Flacăra Mediaș was renamed as Energia Mediaș.

Locomotiva Târgu Mureș was renamed as Recolta Târgu Mureș.

Metalul Câmpia Turzii was renamed as Energia Câmpia Turzii.

Metalul Hunedoara was renamed as Energia Hunedoara.

== League tables ==
=== Serie I ===
Pos	Team	Pld	W	D	L	GF	GA	GD	Pts	Promotion or relegation
1	Recolta Târgu Mureș (C, P)	24	14	5	5	55	20	+35	33	Promotion to Divizia A
2	Energia Hunedoara	24	11	9	4	49	24	+25	31	
3	Energia Câmpia Turzii	24	10	6	8	27	26	+1	26	
4	Energia Mediaș	24	11	3	10	34	34	0	25	
5	Locomotiva Arad	24	10	5	9	37	42	−5	25	
6	Progresul Sibiu	24	10	4	10	31	36	−5	24	
7	Metalul Tractorul	24	9	4	11	32	31	+1	22	
8	Metalul Reșița	24	9	4	11	40	40	0	22	
9	Minerul Lupeni	24	10	1	13	26	34	−8	21	
10	Locomotiva Cluj	24	9	3	12	30	41	−11	21	
11	Avântul Reghin	24	8	5	11	43	60	−17	21	
12	Progresul Satu Mare (R)	24	7	7	10	36	52	−16	21	Relegation to Divizia C
13	Locomotiva Turnu Severin (R)	24	7	6	11	34	34	0	20	Relegation to Divizia C

Source: romaniansoccer.ro
Rules for classification: 1) Points 2) Head-to-head points; 3) Head-to-head goal difference; 4) Head-to-head goals scored; 5) Head-to-head away goals scored; 6) Goal difference; 7) Goals scored.
(C) Champions; (P) Promoted; (R) Relegated

=== Serie II ===
Pos	Team	Pld	W	D	L	GF	GA	GD	Pts	Promotion or relegation
1	Metalul Steagul Roșu (C, P)	26	21	3	2	78	15	+63	45	Promotion to Divizia A
2	Progresul CPCS București	26	14	4	8	61	37	+24	32	
3	Energia 1 Mai Ploiești	26	12	7	7	45	28	+17	31	
4	Dinamo 6 București	26	13	5	8	39	33	+6	31	
5	Flacăra Moreni	26	9	11	6	42	34	+8	29	
6	Locomotiva Constanța	26	11	6	9	53	44	+9	28	
7	Energia Câmpina	26	7	9	10	38	45	−7	23	
8	Știința București	26	8	7	11	34	43	−9	23	
9	Progresul Focșani	26	7	9	10	35	48	−13	23	
10	Dinamo Bârlad	26	9	5	12	37	53	−16	23	
11	Știința Iași	26	4	13	9	25	30	−5	21	
12	Flamura Roșie Burdujeni	26	7	6	13	41	57	−16	20	
13	Locomotiva Iași (R)	26	6	8	12	20	39	−19	20	Relegation to Divizia C
14	Flamura Roșie Bacău (R)	26	4	7	15	29	71	−42	15	Relegation to Divizia C

Source: romaniansoccer.ro
Rules for classification: 1) Points 2) Head-to-head points; 3) Head-to-head goal difference; 4) Head-to-head goals scored; 5) Head-to-head away goals scored; 6) Goal difference; 7) Goals scored.
(C) Champions; (P) Promoted; (R) Relegated

== See also ==
- 1956 Divizia A
