= CS Chimia Brazi =

Romanian football club

Chimia Brazi
- Full name: Club Sportiv Chimia Brazi
- Nickname(s): Chimiștii (The Chemists)
- Founded: 1968; 57 years ago
- Dissolved: 2012; 13 years ago
- Ground: Chimia
- Capacity: 2,000

Club Sportiv Chimia Brazi, commonly known as Chimia Brazi, was a Romanian football club based in Brazi, Prahova County. Established in 1968, the club was dissolved in the summer of 2012 after the merge with Prahova Tomșani to form Fortuna Brazi.

Chimia played on two occasion in the Romanian Second Division and managed to reach the Round of 16 of Cupa României in the 1978–79 season, as well the Round of 32 in the 1982–83, 2009–10 and 2010–11 seasons.

== History ==
The club was founded in 1968 as Chimia Brazi, being financially sustained by the Brazi oil refinery. Chimia managed, under the guidance of Gheorghe Pahonțu, to promoted in Prahova County Championship at the end of 1970–71 season winning the Ploiești Municipal Championship and the promotion play-off tournament.

Chimia won the 1971–72 season of Prahova County Championship qualified for promotion play-off to third division, where they faced the winner of București Municipal Championship UREMOAS București, winning without major difficulties (4–0 at Brazi and 1–1 at București) and promoted for the first time in Divizia C.

== Honours ==
Liga III

- Winners (2): 1977–78, 2005–06
- Runners-up (4): 1980–81, 1983–84, 2004–05, 2010–11

Liga IV – Prahova County

- Winners (2): 1971–72, 1997–98

== Notable former players ==
The footballers mentioned below have played at least 1 season for Chimia Brazi and also played in Liga I for another team.

- (Romania) Valentin Lazăr
- (Romania) Ștefan Preda
- (Romania) Cătălin Cursaru
- (Romania) Nicolae Constantin
- (Romania) Sergiu Arnăutu
- (Romania) Florin Pârvu
- (Romania) Daniel Stana
- (Romania) Viorel Dinu

== Former managers ==
- (Romania) Ștefan Preda (2006–2007)
- (Romania) Vasile Cosarek (2007)
- (Romania) Ștefan Preda (2008–2009)
- (Romania) Octavian Grigore (2010)
- (Romania) Octavian Grigore (2011–2012)
- (Romania) Valentin Negoiță
- (Romania) Mihai Mocanu
- (Romania) Gheorghe Pahonțu
- (Romania) Petre Dragomir
- (Romania) Răzvan Vlad
