= Anton Munteanu =

Romanian footballer (b. 1932, d. 2007)

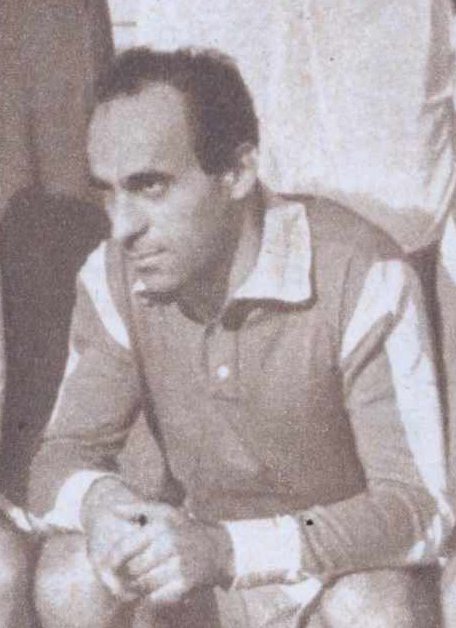

Personal information
- Date of birth: 3 July 1932
- Place of birth: Bucharest, Romania
- Date of death: 22 May 2007 (aged 73)
- Place of death: Romania
- Height: 1.75 m (5 ft 9 in)
- Positions: Forward; midfielder

Youth career
- AS Dămăroaia
- 1950–1951: Laromet București
- 1952: CCA Cluj

Senior career*
| Years | Team | Apps | (Gls) |
| 1952–1954 | Gloria Bistrița | | |
| 1955 | CCA București | 7 | (1) |
| 1956–1965 | Petrolul Ploiești | 112 | (35) |
| Total | | 119 | (36) |

International career
| 1956 | Romania | 1 | (0) |
- * Club domestic league appearances and goals

Anton Munteanu (3 July 1932 – 22 May 2007) was a Romanian footballer.

== Club career ==
"The Munteanu brothers were true magicians of the ball. I would compare them with the unmistakable Dobrin"

— Ovidiu Ioanițoaia, journalist

Munteanu was born on 3 July 1932 in Bucharest, Romania, and spent his entire career from junior to senior level playing alongside his twin brother Dumitru, both of them being known for their dribbling abilities and spectacular play. He grew up in Dămăroaia and began playing junior-level football at the local club, afterwards joining Laromet București, before moving to CCA Cluj where he spent only two weeks. Then he joined Gloria Bistrița, a team he helped reach in 1954 a promotion play-off to Divizia B which was eventually lost. Munteanu made his Divizia A debut on 10 April 1955, playing for CCA București under coach Ilie Savu in a 9–1 away victory against Avântul Reghin in which he scored a goal. In 1956 he went to play for Petrolul Ploiești where he spent seven seasons. In 1958, he and his brother were banned for life from playing football because they were considered "rebels" and "bourgeois elements" by the Communist regime, but after one year they were allowed to play again. In 1961, after Petrolul played a friendly against Brazilian team Grêmio Porto Alegre that ended with a 4–3 victory in which he and his brother were appreciated for their play, they were nicknamed "The Brazilians". He helped the club win the 1962–63 Cupa României under coach Ilie Oană, scoring a goal in the 6–1 victory in the final against Siderurgistul Galați. Munteanu made his last Divizia A appearance playing for The Yellow Wolves on 1 November 1964 in a 1–0 away loss to Steaua București, totaling 119 matches and 36 goals in the competition. He also accumulated 14 matches with five goals in the Cupa României and nine games with one goal in European competitions (including six appearances and one goal in the Inter-Cities Fairs Cup).

== International career ==
Munteanu made one appearance for Romania on 10 September 1986, starting under coach Gheorghe Popescu and playing until the 80th minute of a 2–0 friendly loss to Bulgaria, when he was replaced by Alexandru Ene.

== Death ==
Munteanu died on 22 May 2007 at age 73.

== Honours ==
CCA București

- Cupa României: 1955

Petrolul Ploiești

- Cupa României: 1962–63

== See also ==
- List of European association football families
