= Dumitru Munteanu =

Romanian footballer (1932–2020)

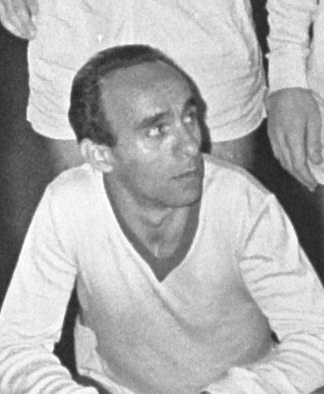
- Munteanu in 1966

Personal information
- Date of birth: 3 July 1932
- Place of birth: Bucharest, Romania
- Date of death: 19 June 2020 (aged 87)
- Place of death: Bucharest, Romania
- Height: 1.71 m (5 ft 7 in)
- Positions: Forward; midfielder

Youth career
- AS Dămăroaia
- 1950–1951: Laromet București
- 1952: CCA Cluj

Senior career*
Years	Team	Apps	(Gls)
1952–1954	Gloria Bistrița		
1955	CCA București	1	(0)
1956–1966	Petrolul Ploiești (Note: The 1957 championship called Cupa Primăverii is unofficial, so the appearances and goals scored at that competition for Petrolul Ploiești are not official.)	135	(19)
Total		136	(19)

International career
1962	Romania	1	(0)
- * Club domestic league appearances and goals

Dumitru Munteanu (3 July 1932 – 19 June 2020) was a Romanian footballer.

== Club career ==
"The Munteanu brothers were true magicians of the ball. I would compare them with the unmistakable Dobrin"

— Ovidiu Ioanițoaia, journalist

Munteanu was born on 3 July 1932 in Bucharest, Romania, and spent his entire career from junior to senior level playing alongside his twin brother Anton, both of them being known for their dribbling abilities and spectacular play. He grew up in Dămăroaia and began playing junior-level football at the local club, afterwards joining Laromet București, before moving to CCA Cluj where he spent only two weeks. Then he joined Gloria Bistrița, a team he helped reach in 1954 a promotion play-off to Divizia B which was eventually lost. Munteanu made his Divizia A debut on 6 May 1955, playing for CCA București under coach Ilie Savu in a 1–0 loss against Flamura Roșie Arad, this being his only league appearance for the team.

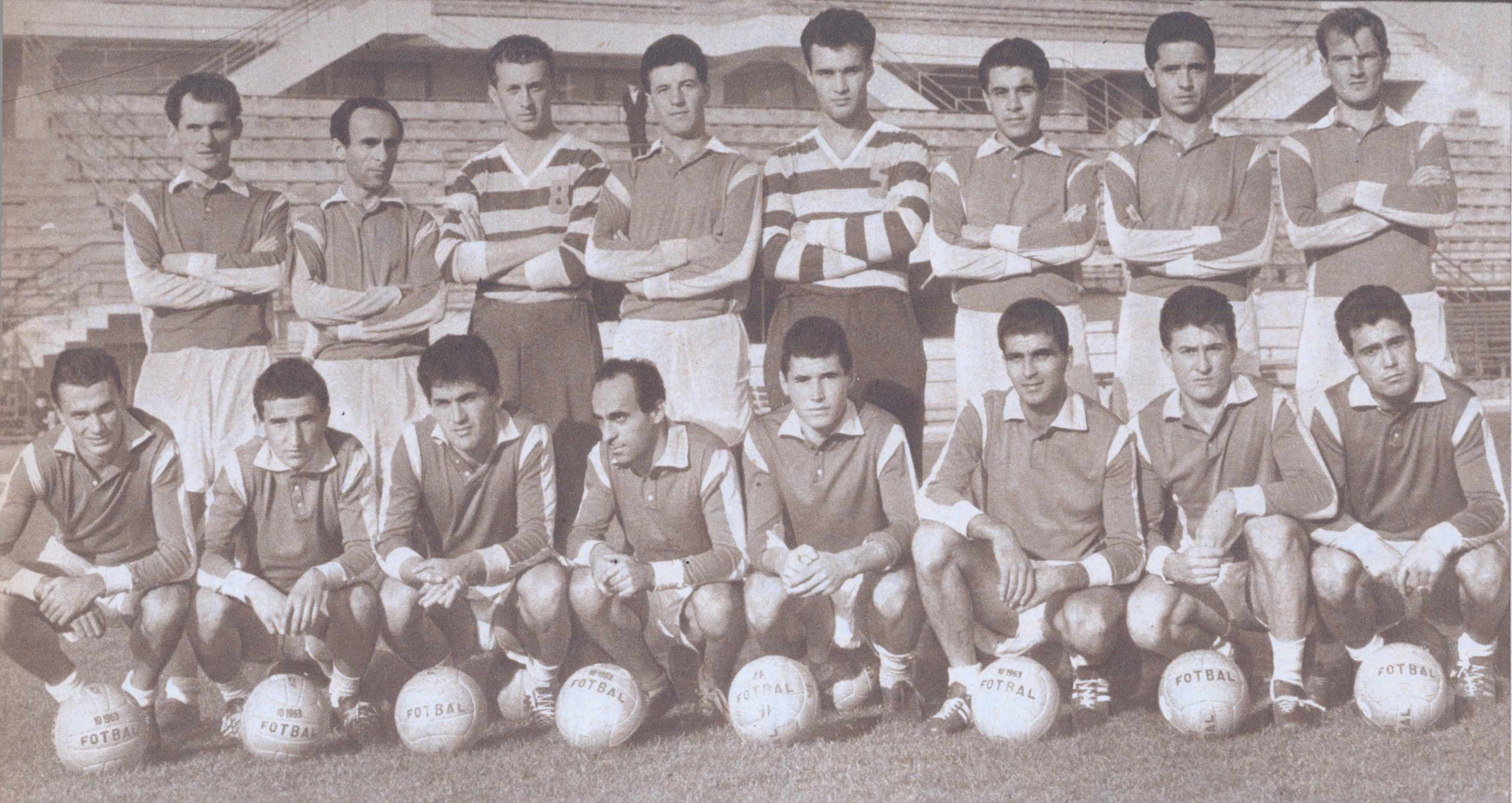
Munteanu (top row second from left) with Petrolul in 1963.

In 1956 he went to play for Petrolul Ploiești where he spent nine seasons. Munteanu helped the club win two Divizia A titles in the 1957–58 and 1965–66 seasons. In the first season, he was used by coach Ilie Oană in 11 matches in which he scored three goals and in the second, coach Constantin Cernăianu gave him three appearances. In 1958, he and his brother were banned for life from playing football because they were considered "rebels" and "bourgeois elements" by the Communist regime, but after one year they were allowed to play again. In 1961, after Petrolul played a friendly against Brazilian team Grêmio Porto Alegre that ended with a 4–3 victory in which he and his brother were appreciated for their play, they were nicknamed "The Brazilians". Munteanu also helped The Yellow Wolves win the 1962–63 Cupa României, being used by coach Oană the entire match in the 6–1 victory in the final against Siderurgistul Galați. He made his last Divizia A appearance playing for them on 8 May 1966 in a 2–1 home victory against CSMS Iași, totaling 136 matches and 19 goals in the competition. He also accumulated 19 matches with six goals in the Cupa României and 11 games in European competitions (including seven appearances in the Inter-Cities Fairs Cup).

== International career ==
Munteanu made one appearance for Romania on 14 October 1962 when coach Constantin Teașcă sent him in the 25th minute to replace Ion Nunweiller in a 3–2 friendly loss to East Germany.

== Death ==
Munteanu died on 19 June 2020 at age 87.

== Honours ==
CCA București

- Cupa României: 1955

Petrolul Ploiești

- Divizia A: 1957–58, 1965–66
- Cupa României: 1962–63

== See also ==
- List of European association football families
