= Mircea Dridea =

Romanian former footballer and manager

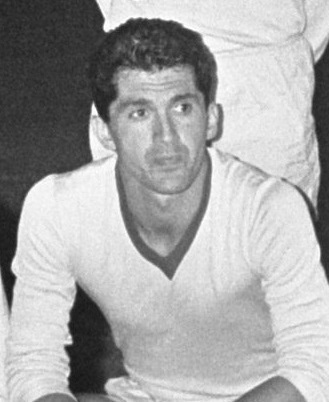
- Dridea in 1966

Personal information
- Date of birth: 7 April 1937 (age 89)
- Place of birth: Ploiești, Romania
- Height: 1.77 m (5 ft 10 in)
- Position: Forward

Team information
- Current team: Petrolul Ploiești (honorary president)

Youth career
- 1952–1956: Petrolul Ploiești

Senior career*
Years	Team	Apps	(Gls)
1956–1971	Petrolul Ploiești	273	(142)

International career
1959–1967	Romania (Note: Including three appearances for Romania's Olympic team.)	18	(8)

Managerial career
- 1972–1973: Petrolul Ploiești (juniors)
- 1973: Petrolul Ploiești (assistant)
- 1974: Petrolul Ploiești (interim)
- 1974–1976: Petrolul Teleajen
- 1981–1982: Petrolul Ploiești
- 1982–1983: FAR Rabat
- 1984–1985: Prahova Ploiești
- 1985–1987: Petrolul Ploiești
- 1987–1988: Kénitra
- 1988: Progresul Brăila
- 1988: Sportul Studențesc București
- 1989: Oțelul Galați
- 1990–1991: Flacăra Moreni
- 1991–1993: Metalul Plopeni
- 1993–1994: Olympic Alexandria
- 1995–1996: Metalul Filipeștii de Pădure
- 1996–1997: Olympique de Médenine
- * Club domestic league appearances and goals

Mircea Dridea (born 7 April 1937) is a Romanian former professional football player and manager, who is the current honorary president of Liga I club Petrolul Ploiești.

== Club career ==
Dridea was born on 7 April 1937 in Ploiești and at age 15 he was a category one chess player. He was brought by his brother Virgil to play football in 1952 at the junior squads of Petrolul Ploiești where his first coach was Emil Avasilichioaie. In 1954 he worked with Manole Rădulescu until 1955, when Traian Ionescu came to the club and formed a generation of juniors which included him, Constantin Tabarcea and Vasile Sfetcu that reached the national junior championship final which was lost to Universitatea Cluj. He made his Divizia A debut under coach Ilie Oană in October 1956 in a 2–1 away victory against Rapid București.

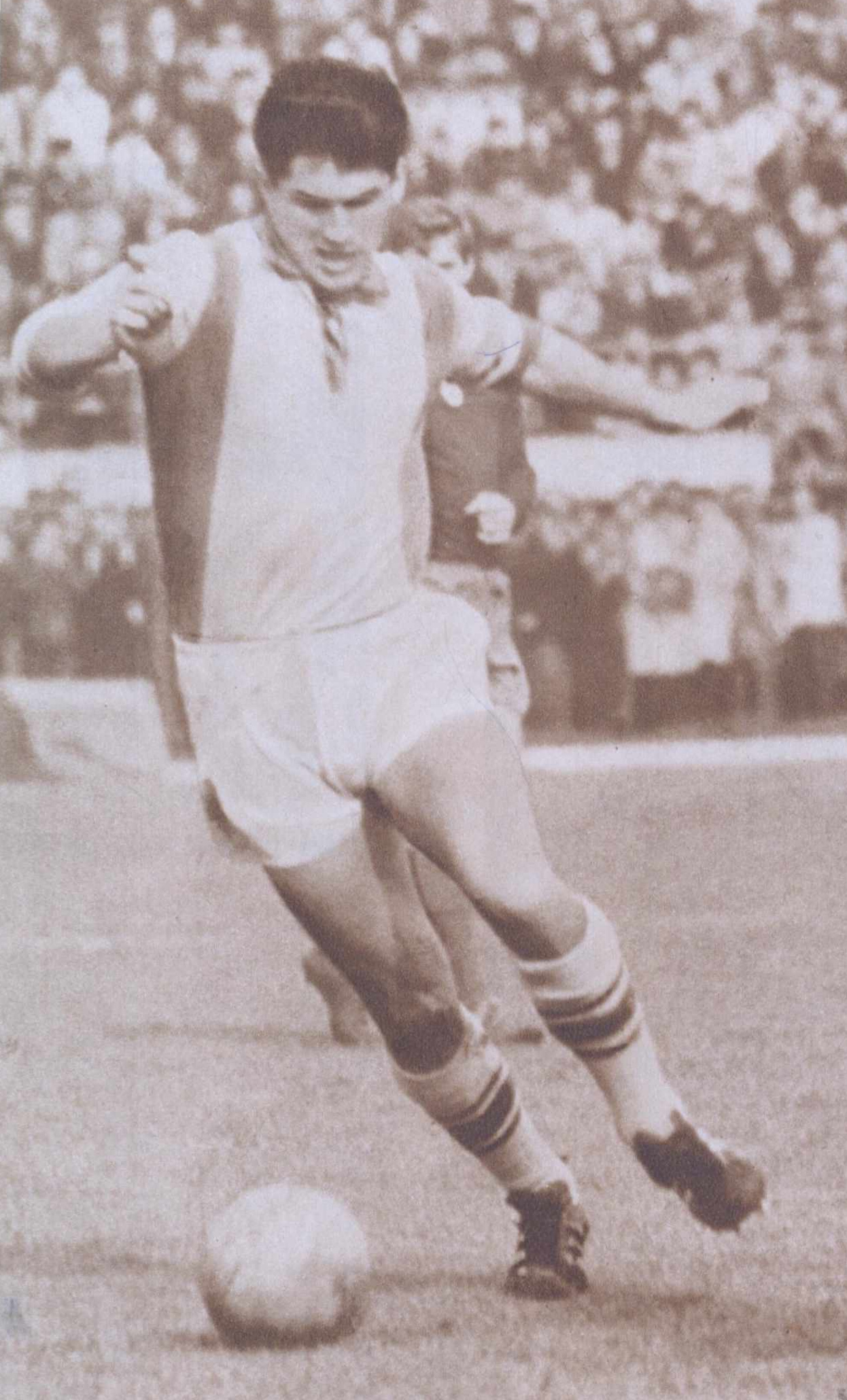
Dridea in action for Petrolul in 1966

Under the guidance of Oană, Dridea won two consecutive titles in the 1957–58 and 1958–59 seasons. In the first one he played 11 matches in which he scored four goals and in the second he netted 14 goals in 18 games, being the top-scorer of the team. He scored a hat-trick in the 6–1 victory against Siderurgistul Galați in the 1963 Cupa României final. Subsequently, he won another championship in the 1965–66 season, being used by coach Constantin Cernăianu in 25 games in which he scored 11 goals. Dridea has a total of 21 games with 10 goals scored in European competitions (including 10 appearances and five goals netted in the Inter-Cities Fairs Cup), and achieved some notable performances. He scored Petrolul's first two goals in the European Cup during a 4–2 loss to Wismut Karl Marx Stadt, the first goal in the UEFA Cup Winners' Cup in a 4–1 loss to Fenerbahçe and the first goal in the Inter-Cities Fairs Cup in a 4–0 win over Spartak Brno. His most important goal scored was in the first round of the 1966–67 European Cup against Liverpool from a free kick in a 3–1 victory, but they did not manage to qualify to the next round.

Dridea made his last Divizia A appearance on 20 June 1971 in Petrolul's 1–1 draw against CFR Timișoara, totaling 273 matches with 142 goals in the competition.

== International career ==
Dridea played 15 games and scored eight goals for Romania, making his debut under coach Augustin Botescu on 30 August 1959 in a friendly that ended with a 3–2 away win over Poland in which he scored a hat-trick.

He played in a 2–0 home victory against Portugal in the 1966 World Cup qualifiers after which opponent Eusébio said that he considered Dridea the man of the match. He also played four games in the Euro 1968 qualifiers with one goal scored in a 4–2 home win over Switzerland and a double netted in a 5–1 victory against Cyprus.

=== International goals ===
Scores and results list Romania's goal tally first. "Score" column indicates the score after each Mircea Dridea goal.

#	Date	Venue	Opponent	Score	Result	Competition
1.	30 August 1959	Stadion Dziesięciolecia, Warsaw, Poland	Poland	1–0	3–2	Friendly
2.	30 August 1959	Stadion Dziesięciolecia, Warsaw, Poland	Poland	2–1	3–2	Friendly
3.	30 August 1959	Stadion Dziesięciolecia, Warsaw, Poland	Poland	3–2	3–2	Friendly
4.	14 May 1961	19 Mayıs Stadium, Ankara, Turkey	Turkey	1–0	1–0	Friendly
5.	2 November 1966	Stadionul Republicii, București, Romania	Switzerland	1–0	4–2	Euro 1968 qualifiers
6.	3 December 1966	GSP Stadium, Nicosia, Cyprus	Cyprus	1–1	5–1	Euro 1968 qualifiers
7.	3 December 1966	GSP Stadium, Nicosia, Cyprus	Cyprus	5–1	5–1	Euro 1968 qualifiers
8.	22 March 1967	Parc des Princes, Paris, France	France	2–0	2–1	Friendly

== Managerial career ==
Dridea started his career as coach at a junior squad of Petrolul Ploiești, winning the 1972–73 national junior title. He started the 1973–74 Divizia A season as an assistant of Gheorghe Dumitrescu for Petrolul's senior team, but after finishing the first half of the season in 16th place, Dumitrescu left the club. Thus, Dridea became the head coach of the team for the second half, but could not save the team from relegation to Divizia B. He then coached Petrolul Teleajen in Divizia C for almost two years, being close to a promotion to Divizia B. He returned to Petrolul to lead them in the 1981–82 Divizia B season, helping the club achieve promotion to Divizia A. In the winter of 1982 the Moroccan Football Federation asked the Romanian Football Federation to send them four coaches, and one of them was Dridea who went to FAR Rabat, leaving the club at 1983. He came back to Romania, working at Divizia B club, Prahova Ploiești which he helped avoid relegation. He returned for a third spell as coach at Petrolul, because Petre Dragomir left the team after the first six games of the 1985–86 Divizia A, leading them for two seasons. Dridea went to coach for a second spell in Morocco at Kénitra, afterwards returning to Romania at Progresul Brăila. He coached in the first half of the 1988–89 Divizia A season at Sportul Studențesc București, working in the second half at Oțelul Galați. In the following years he coached in the Romanian lower leagues at Flacăra Moreni, Metalul Plopeni which he helped get promoted to Divizia B and Metalul Filipeștii de Pădure with whom he earned a promotion to Divizia C after winning a play-off against Foresta Nehoiu. He also had a spell in Egypt at Olympic Alexandria and ended his coaching career in Tunisia at Olympique de Médenine in 1997. Dridea has a total of 121 matches as a manager in the Romanian top-division, Divizia A, consisting of 37 victories, 33 draws and 51 losses. He also worked as Petrolul's president on three occasions.

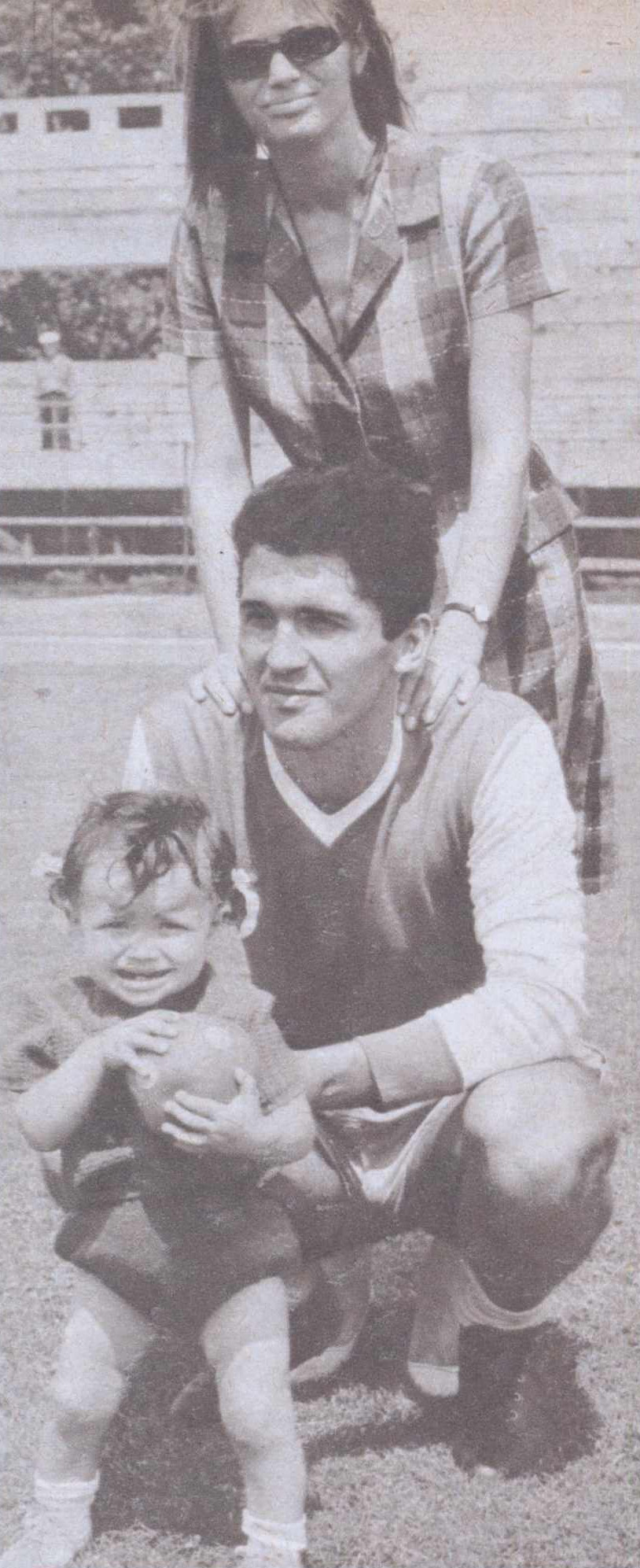
Dridea with his wife Mihaela and their daughter Dana in 1966

== Style of play ==
Dridea described his style of play as:"I worked enormously to be very good at headers and free kicks. If we were to go by talent, I wouldn't be in the top 20 players in the history of Petrolul. But in terms of utility, I'm sure on the podium".

== Personal life ==
Dridea's brother, Virgil, was also a footballer and a manager, they played together at Petrolul Ploiești, winning two Divizia A titles. They were opponents as managers in the 1981–82 Divizia B season when Dridea coached Petrolul and Virgil coached Metalul Plopeni.

In 2002, Dridea was awarded the Honorary Citizen of the Ploiești Municipality title.

== Honours ==
=== Player ===
Petrolul Ploiești

- Divizia A: 1957–58, 1958–59, 1965–66
- Cupa României: 1962–63

=== Manager ===
Petrolul Ploiești

- Divizia B: 1981–82

Metalul Plopeni

- Divizia C: 1992–93

== See also ==
- List of one-club men
- List of European association football families
