= Alexandru Badea =

Romanian footballer (b. 1938, d. 1986)

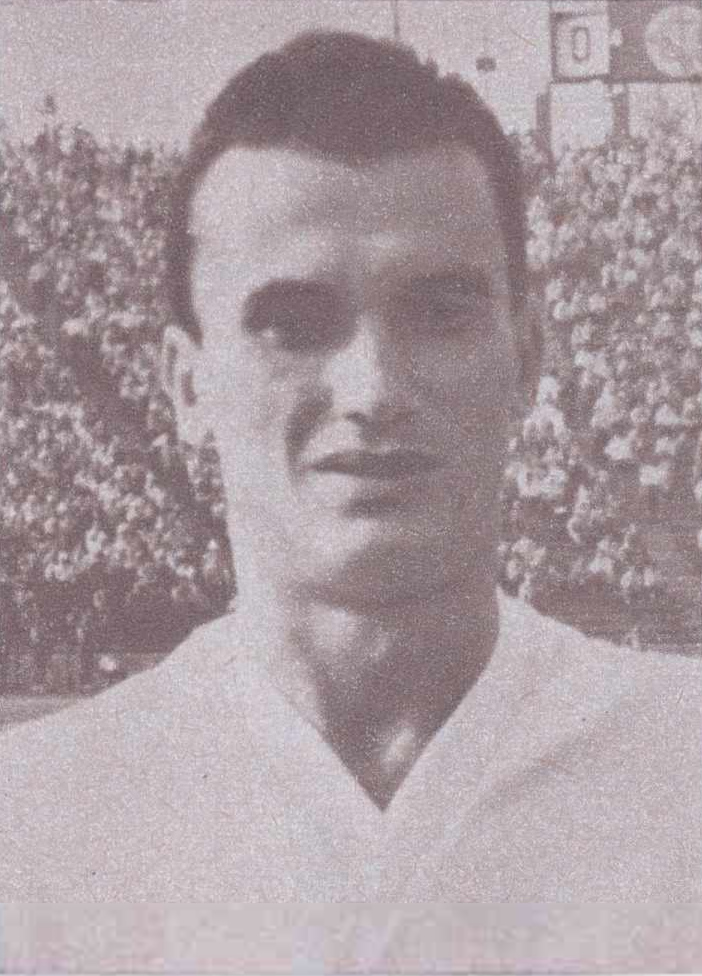
- Badea in 1963

Personal information
- Date of birth: 8 March 1938
- Place of birth: Bilciurești, Romania
- Date of death: 17 July 1986 (aged 48)
- Place of death: Ploiești, Romania
- Height: 1.74 m (5 ft 9 in)
- Position: Striker

Youth career
- 1952–1954: Flacăra Moreni
- 1954–1957: GRT Moreni
- 1957–1958: Flacăra Moreni

Senior career*
Years	Team	Apps	(Gls)
1958–1959	Flacăra Moreni		
1960–1968	Petrolul Ploiești	197	(52)
1968–1971	Farul Constanța	71	(9)
1971–1974	Gloria Buzău		
Total		268	(61)

International career
1965–1966	Romania	4	(2)
- * Club domestic league appearances and goals

Alexandru Badea (8 March 1938 – 17 July 1986) was a Romanian footballer who played as a striker.

== Club career ==
Badea was born on 8 March 1938 in Bilciurești, Romania and began playing junior-level football in 1952 at Flacăra Moreni. Two years later he went to neighboring club GRT where he spent three years. Then he returned to Flacăra where in 1958 he started to play for the senior squad in Divizia B.

In 1960 he joined Petrolul Ploiești and made his Divizia A debut under coach Ilie Oană on 6 March in a 1–0 home loss to Progresul București. His first performance was winning the 1962–63 Cupa României, being used the entire match by coach Oană in the 6–1 win over Siderurgistul Galați in the final. He then won the 1965–66 Divizia A championship, being used by coach Constantin Cernăianu in 23 matches in which he scored 11 goals. Badea played two games for The Yellow Wolves in the first round of the 1966–67 European Cup against Liverpool which included a 3–1 victory, but they did not manage to qualify to the next round.

In 1968, Badea joined Farul Constanța where on 27 June 1971 he made his last Divizia A appearance in a 4–1 away loss to Rapid București, totaling 268 games with 61 goals in the competition and 17 matches with two goals in European competitions (including 13 appearances and two goals in the Inter-Cities Fairs Cup). Afterwards he went to Divizia C club Gloria Buzău where in his first season he scored 25 goals that helped the team gain promotion to Divizia B. There, after he played two more seasons, Badea retired.

== International career ==
Badea played four matches for Romania, scoring two goals, making his debut under coach Ilie Oană on 21 November 1965 against Eusébio's Portugal in a 1966 World Cup qualification match, scoring his side's final goal in a 2–0 home victory. His following three games were friendlies, the last one taking place on 7 December 1966 in a 2–1 away victory against Israel in which he scored once.

=== International goals ===
Scores and results list Romania's goal tally first, score column indicates score after each Badea goal.

Goal	Date	Venue	Opponent	Score	Result	Competition
1	21 November 1965	23 August Stadium, București, Romania	Portugal	2–0	2–0	1966 World Cup qualifiers
2	7 December 1966	Bloomfield Stadium, Tel Aviv, Israel	Israel	1–1	2–1	Friendly

== Style of play ==
In the book Petrolul Ploiești, Istorie și Tradiție (Petrolul Ploiești, History and Tradition), writer Răzvan Frațilă described Badea's style of play as:"An artist of the green rectangle, who slipped with the skill of a fencer between the barricades of concrete defenses, dominated by force. A complete footballer, capable of acting all over the field".

== Death ==
Badea died on 17 July 1986 in Ploiești at age 48.

== Honours ==
Petrolul Ploiești

- Divizia A: 1965–66
- Cupa României: 1962–63

Gloria Buzău

- Divizia C: 1971–72
