= Constantin Moldoveanu =

Romanian footballer, manager, and referee

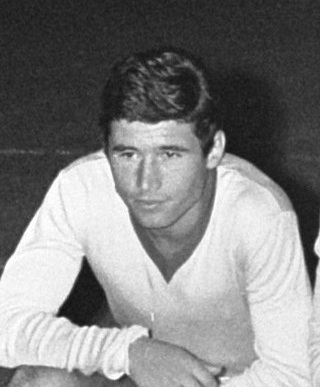

Personal information
- Date of birth: 25 October 1943
- Place of birth: Ploiești, Romania
- Date of death: 10 September 2013 (aged 69)
- Place of death: Ploiești, Romania
- Height: 1.75 m (5 ft 9 in)
- Position: Left winger

Youth career
- 1958–1960: CSMS Iași
- 1961–1962: Petrolul Ploiești

Senior career*
Years	Team	Apps	(Gls)
1962–1963	Petrolul Ploiești	24	(5)
1964	Steaua București	4	(2)
1964–1969	Petrolul Ploiești	99	(19)
1969–1972	Politehnica Iași	73	(26)
1972–1974	Sportul Studențesc București	22	(7)
1974–1975	Petrolul Ploiești	1	(0)
1975–1976	Prahova Ploiești		
Total		223	(59)

International career
1967	Romania	1	(0)

Managerial career
- 1974–1975: Petrolul Ploiești (juniors)
- 1975–1976: IUC Ploiești
- 1976–1977: Chimistul Valea Călugărească
- 1977–1983: Prahova Ploiești
- 1983–1984: Metalul Plopeni
- 1984–1986: Steaua Mizil
- 1986–1987: Gloria Buzău
- 1987: Petrolul Ploiești
- 1988–1994: Prahova Ploiești
- 1994–1995: Flacăra Moreni
- 1995–1996: Steaua Mizil
- 1996–1997: Politehnica Iași
- 1998: Petrolul Ploiești
- * Club domestic league appearances and goals

Constantin Moldoveanu (25 October 1943 – 10 September 2013) was a Romanian football forward, manager and referee.

== Club career ==
Moldoveanu was born on 25 October 1943 in Ploiești, Romania and began playing football in 1958 at the junior squads of CSMS Iași. In 1961 he returned to Ploiești to play for Petrolul where on 19 August 1962 he made his Divizia A debut under coach Ilie Oană in a 0–0 draw against Progresul București. He scored two goals in a 6–1 victory against Siderurgistul Galați in the 1963 Cupa României final that helped Petrolul Ploiești win the first Cupa României in the club's history. In 1964 he went to play for half a season at Steaua București, returning afterwards to Petrolul. In his second spell with The Yellow Wolves, Moldoveanu helped the team win the 1965–66 Divizia A title, being used by coach Constantin Cernăianu in 24 matches in which he scored six goals. Moldoveanu also played three games in the first round of the 1966–67 European Cup against Liverpool that included a 3–1 victory in which he scored a goal, but they did not manage to qualify to the next round. In 1969 he went to play for Politehnica Iași where in the 1970–71 Divizia A season he scored 15 goals, being the top-scorer of the league alongside Florea Dumitrache and Gheorghe Tătaru. In 1972 Moldoveanu joined Sportul Studențesc București where on 28 October 1973 he made his last Divizia A appearance in a 2–0 away loss to UTA Arad, totaling 222 appearances and 59 goals in the competition. He also accumulated 16 matches and eight goals in the Cupa României and nine matches with one goal in European competitions (including four games in the Inter-Cities Fairs Cup). Moldoveanu ended his career by playing two seasons in Divizia B, first at Petrolul and then at Prahova Ploiești.

== International career ==
Moldoveanu played one friendly game for Romania on 4 January 1967, when coach Bazil Marian sent him in the 14th minute to replace captain Ion Ionescu in a 1–1 draw against Uruguay in Montevideo at Estadio Gran Parque Central.

== Managerial career ==
Moldoveanu worked as a coach mainly in the Romanian lower leagues, having a few spells in Divizia A at Gloria Buzău and Petrolul Ploiești. He also coached juniors for many years and worked for a while as a football referee.

== Death ==
On 10 September 2013, Moldoveanu died in the Ploiești County Hospital.

== Honours ==
=== Club ===
Petrolul Ploiești

- Divizia A: 1965–66
- Cupa României: 1962–63

=== Individual ===
- Divizia A top scorer: 1970–71
