= Virgil Dridea =

Romanian footballer and manager (1949–2022)

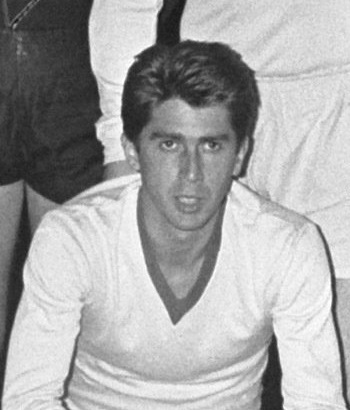
- Dridea in 1966

Personal information
- Full name: Virgil Sebastian Dridea
- Date of birth: 17 November 1940
- Place of birth: Ploiești, Romania
- Date of death: 29 May 2022 (aged 81)
- Height: 1.78 m (5 ft 10 in)
- Position: Midfielder

Youth career
- 1950–1958: Petrolul Ploiești

Senior career*
Years	Team	Apps	(Gls)
1958–1968	Petrolul Ploiești	82	(12)
1959–1961	→ Știința București (loan)		
1968–1970	Metalul Plopeni		

Managerial career
- 1970–1976: Metalul Plopeni (assistant)
- 1977–1983: Metalul Plopeni
- 1983–1985: Petro do Huambo
- 1985–1988: Prahova Ploiești
- 1988–1992: Petrolul Ploiești
- 1992–1993: Syria
- 1994–1995: Dacia Unirea Brăila
- 1995–1996: Metalul Plopeni
- 1996–1997: Al-Jaish
- 1997–1999: Midia Năvodari
- 1999–2000: Petrolul Ploiești
- 2000–2001: Midia Năvodari
- 2001–2002: Cimentul Fieni
- 2002–2003: Chindia Târgoviște
- 2003–2004: Metalul Plopeni
- 2004: Petrolul Ploiești
- * Club domestic league appearances and goals

Virgil Dridea (17 November 1940 – 29 May 2022), also known as Puiu Dridea, was a Romanian football player and manager.

== Playing career ==
Dridea was born on 17 November 1940 in Ploiești, Romania and began playing junior-level football at local club, Petrolul where his first coach was Mihai Cristache, later working with Emil Avasilichioaie. On 24 August 1958 he made his senior debut under coach Ilie Oană in a 3–0 Divizia A victory against Jiul Petroșani, that being his only appearance in that season as the club won the title. From 1959 until 1961 he played for Știința București in Divizia B. Afterwards he returned to Petrolul where he won the 1962–63 Cupa României. Dridea won another title in the 1965–66 season where he was used by coach Constantin Cernăianu in 18 matches in which he scored six goals, including a goal from a corner kick in a 1–0 victory against Rapid București. He also played two games for The Yellow Wolves in the first round of the 1966–67 European Cup against Liverpool which included a 3–1 victory, but they did not manage to qualify to the next round. His last Divizia A game took place on 3 September 1968 in Petrolul's 3–1 victory against Jiul Petroșani, totaling 82 matches with 12 goals in the competition. Afterwards, Dridea went to play for two years in Divizia C at Metalul Plopeni where he ended his career.

== Managerial career ==
Dridea started coaching at Metalul Plopeni as an assistant from 1970 until 1977 under head coaches Gheorghe Bărbulescu, Marian Alexandru, Nicolae Marinescu and Adalbert Marosi. He was named head coach of Metalul in the second half of the 1976–77 Divizia B season, leading them until 1983. During this time the team was relegated to Divizia C, but he stayed with the club, helping it get promoted back to the second league after one season. In 1983, Dridea went to work abroad in Angola at Petro do Huambo until 1985, then he returned to Romania at Prahova Ploiești which he led for three years in Divizia B. In 1988 he took charge of Petrolul Ploiești, taking it from Divizia B to Divizia A and later to the 1990–91 UEFA Cup where they were eliminated by Anderlecht. In 1992 he had his second experience abroad going to coach for one year the Syrian national team. Afterwards he went back to Romania at Dacia Unirea Brăila with whom he earned a second place in the 1994–95 Divizia B season. In the following years he went for a second spell at Metalul Plopeni, had a second experience in Syria at Al-Jaish and earned another second Divizia B place with Midia Năvodari. Dridea returned to Divizia A football during his second spell at Petrolul in the 1999–2000 season in which he earned two historical victories against Steaua București, a 5–1 at home and a 4–1 at the Ghencea stadium, and also a 4–2 home victory against Mircea Lucescu's Rapid București who were the title holders. Afterwards he went to coach in the lower leagues, starting with a second spell at Midia, then going to Cimentul Fieni, Chindia Târgoviște and for a third spell at Plopeni. He retired after a third spell at Petrolul which took place from July until December 2004. Dridea has a total of 134 games managed in Divizia A, all of them at Petrolul, consisting of 58 victories, 23 draws and 53 losses.

== Personal life ==
Dridea's brother, Mircea, was also a footballer and a manager, they played together at Petrolul Ploiești, winning two Divizia A titles. They were opponents as managers in the 1981–82 Divizia B season when Virgil coached Metalul Plopeni and Mircea coached Petrolul.

== Death ==
Dridea died on 29 May 2022 at age 81.

== Honours ==
=== Player ===
Petrolul Ploiești

- Divizia A: 1958–59, 1965–66
- Cupa României: 1962–63

=== Manager ===
Metalul Plopeni

- Divizia C: 1982–83

Petrolul Ploiești

- Divizia B: 1988–89
