= Vasile Sfetcu =

Romanian footballer and manager

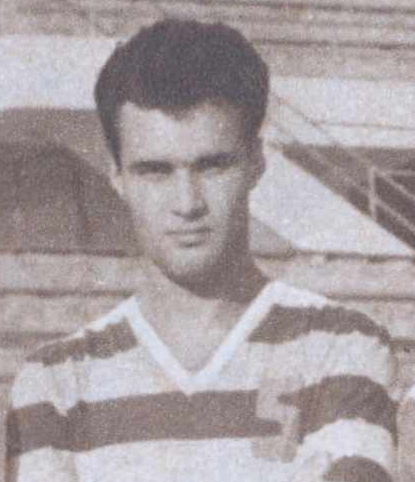
- Sfetcu with Petrolul in 1963.

Personal information
- Date of birth: 10 May 1937
- Place of birth: Ploiești, Romania
- Date of death: 16 September 2016 (aged 79)
- Place of death: Constanța, Romania
- Height: 1.83 m (6 ft 0 in)
- Position: Goalkeeper

Youth career
- 1951–1953: Metalul Ploiești

Senior career*
Years	Team	Apps	(Gls)
1954–1955	Petrolul Ploiești	1	(0)
1956	Metalul 1 Mai Ploiești		
1957–1969	Petrolul Ploiești (Note: The 1957 championship called Cupa Primăverii is unofficial, so the appearances at that competition for Petrolul Ploiești are not official.)	160	(0)
1970–1973	Metalul Plopeni	7	(0)
Total		168	(0)

International career
1962	Romania	3	(0)

Managerial career
- IMU Medgidia
- Șoimii Cernavodă
- CFR Constanța
- * Club domestic league appearances and goals

Vasile Sfetcu (10 May 1937 - 16 September 2016) was a Romanian football goalkeeper and manager.

== Club career ==
Sfetcu was born on 10 May 1937 in Ploiești, Romania and began playing junior-level football in 1951 at local club Metalul. Afterwards he joined neighboring club Petrolul where he made his Divizia A debut on 24 November 1954 under coach Ilie Oană in a 3–1 away loss to Metalul Hunedoara. Subsequently, he went to play one season for Metalul 1 Mai Ploiești in Divizia B. Sfetcu returned to Petrolul where he won two consecutive Divizia A titles in the 1957–58 and 1958–59 seasons. He was used by coach Oană in 17 matches in the first season and in 20 in the second one. Sfetcu was a starter under Oană in the 6–1 victory against Siderurgistul Galați in the 1963 Cupa României final until he was replaced by Mihai Ionescu in the 85th minute. He played seven matches in the 1962–63 Inter-Cities Fairs Cup, the team reaching the quarter-finals where they were defeated with 2–1 on aggregate by Ferencváros. In the 1965–66 season he won another title with The Yellow Wolves, being used by coach Constantin Cernăianu in five games. He made his last Divizia A appearance on 26 March 1969 in Petrolul's 2–0 away loss to UTA Arad, totaling 161 matches in the competition and 14 appearances in European competitions (including seven games in the Inter-Cities Fairs Cup). After three more seasons spent at Metalul Plopeni in the Romanian lower leagues, Sfetcu retired from his playing career.

== International career ==
Sfetcu played three games for Romania, making his debut on 30 September 1962 when coach Constantin Teașcă sent him in the 80th minute to replace Gheorghe Dungu in a 4–0 friendly victory against Morocco. His second game was a 6–0 away loss against Spain in the 1964 European Nations' Cup qualifiers. Sfetcu's last appearance was another friendly against Morocco which took place on 23 December 1962 and it ended with a 3–1 away loss, coach Silviu Ploeșteanu sending him in the 40th minute to replace Ion Voinescu.

== Coaching career ==
Sfetcu coached the junior teams of Petrolul Ploiești and other clubs from the county. Afterwards he settled in Constanța, where he trained several other teams from the area: IMU Medgidia, Șoimii Cernavodă and CFR Constanța.

== Death ==
Sfetcu died on 16 September 2016 in Constanța at age 79.

== Honours ==
=== Player ===
Petrolul Ploiești

- Divizia A: 1957–58, 1958–59, 1965–66
- Cupa României: 1962–63

Metalul Plopeni

- Divizia C: 1970–71
