= Ion Zaharia =

Romanian footballer

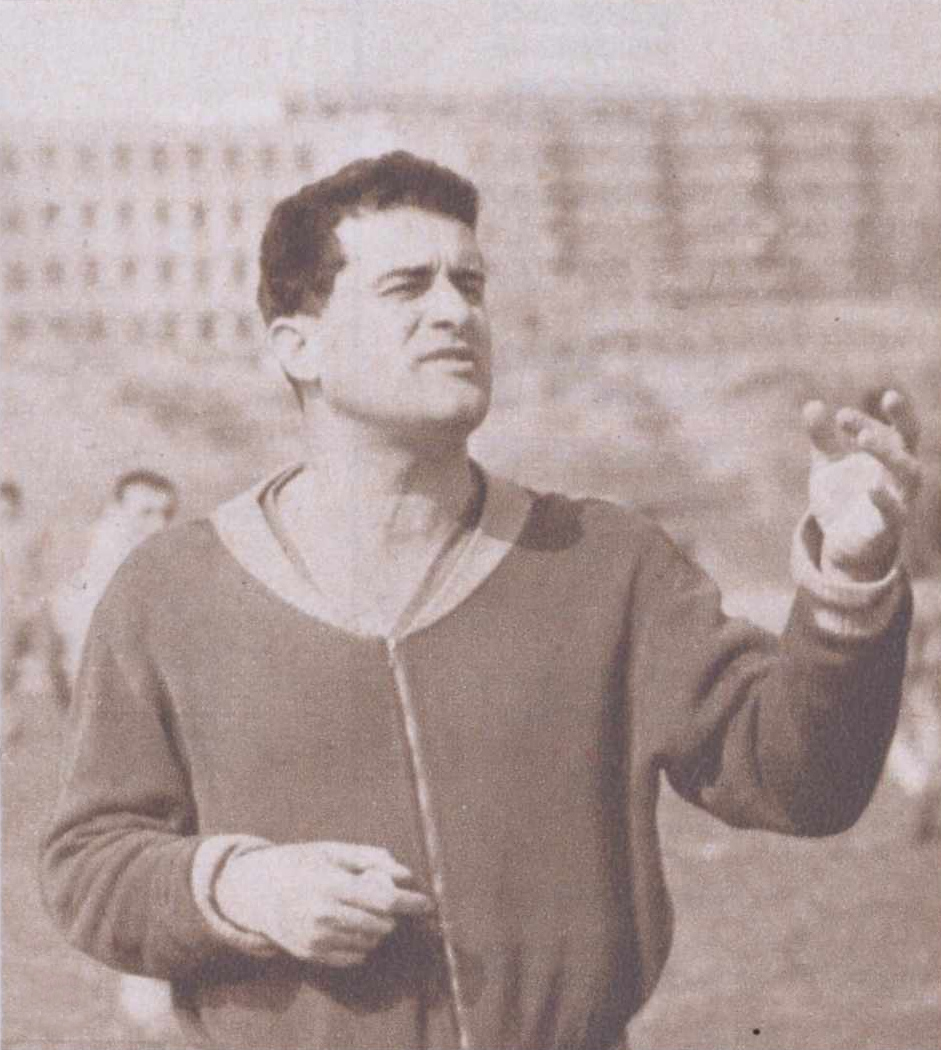

Personal information
- Date of birth: 20 September 1929
- Place of birth: Drăgănești, Romania
- Date of death: 5 November 1996 (aged 67)
- Place of death: Bucharest, Romania
- Position: Right midfielder

Senior career*
Years	Team	Apps	(Gls)
1948–1950	Juventus București		
1950–1955	Flacăra Poiana Câmpina		
1955–1963	Petrolul Ploiești (Note: The 1957 championship called Cupa Primăverii is unofficial, so the appearances and goals scored at that competition for Petrolul Ploiești are not official.)	124	(45)

International career
1956	Romania	1	(1)

Managerial career
- 1964–1965: Știința Galați
- 1965–1966: Siderurgistul Galați
- 1966–1967: Știința Galați
- 1967–1968: CSMS Iași
- 1968–1971: I.M.U. Medgidia
- 1972–1977: CSU Galați
- 1978–1980: Tehnometal București
- * Club domestic league appearances and goals

Ion Zaharia (20 September 1929 – 5 November 1996) was a Romanian former football right midfielder and manager.

== International career ==
Ion Zaharia played one friendly game at international level for Romania, in which he opened the score in a 2–0 victory against Norway.

== Honours ==
=== Player ===
Petrolul Ploiești

- Divizia A: 1957–58, 1958–59
- Cupa României: 1962–63

=== Manager ===
CSMS Iași

- Divizia B: 1967–68

CSU Galați

- Cupa României runner-up: 1975–76
