= Bilciurești =

- Commune
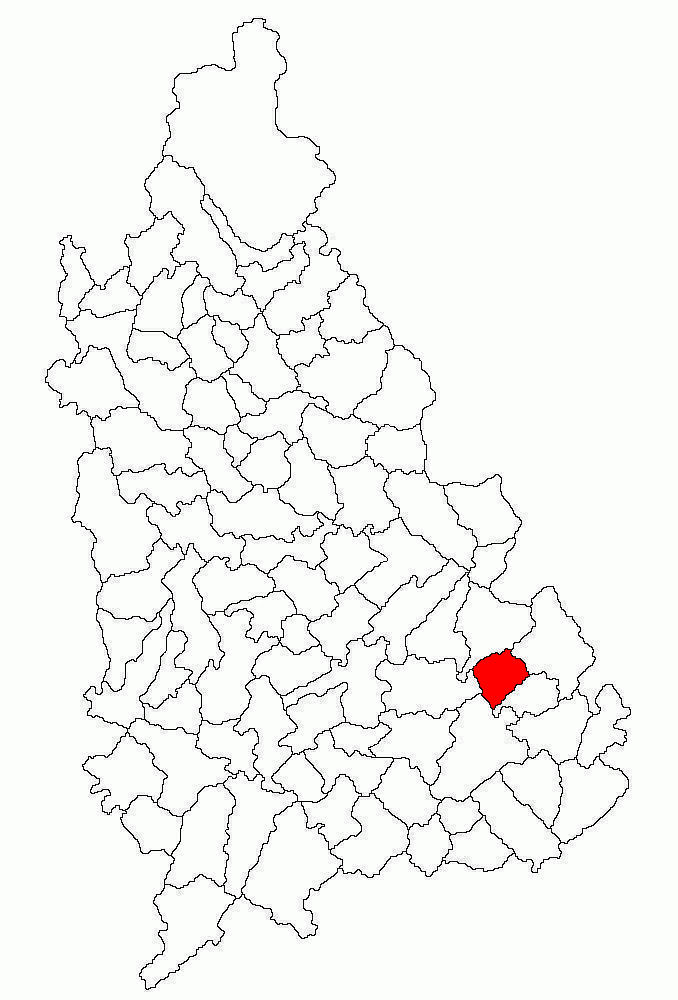
- Location in Dâmbovița County

- Location in Romania
- Coordinates: 44°44′N 25°48′E
- Country: Romania
- County: Dâmbovița

Government
  - Mayor (2020–2024): Adina Stoican (PSD)
- Area: 34.78 km^{2} (13.43 sq mi)
- Elevation: 141 m (463 ft)
- Population (2021-12-01): 1,876
  - Density: 54/km^{2} (140/sq mi)
- Time zone: EET/EEST (UTC+2/+3)
- Postal code: 137045
- Area code: +(40) 245
- Vehicle reg.: DB
- Website: primaria-bilciuresti.ro

Bilciurești is a commune in Dâmbovița County, Muntenia, Romania. It is composed of two villages, Bilciurești and Suseni-Socetu.

Historical population
Year	Pop.	±%
2002	1,842	—
2011	1,889	+2.6%
2021	1,876	−0.7%
Source: Census data

== Natives ==
- Alexandru Badea (1938–1986), footballer
- Gheorghe Dumitrașcu (born 1967), footballer
