= Marius Beraru =

Romanian footballer

Personal information
- Date of birth: 28 November 1920
- Place of birth: Chișinău, Kingdom of Romania
- Date of death: 18 September 1986 (aged 65)
- Place of death: Iași, Socialist Republic of Romania
- Position: Forward

Senior career*
Years	Team	Apps	(Gls)
1937–1939	Mihai Viteazul Chișinău		
1939–1940	Sporting Chișinău		
1940–1944	Sportul Studențesc București (Note: The Divizia A 1940–41 was the last season before World War II and the Divizia A 1946–47 was the first one after, so the appearances and goals scored during this period for Sportul Studențesc București are not official.)	21	(7)
1946–1950	Partizanul Ploiești (Note: The statistics for the 1947–48, 1948–49 and 1950 Divizia B seasons are unavailable.)	20	(5)
Total		41	(12)

International career
1942	Romania	1	(0)

Managerial career
- 1977–1978: Constructorul Iași
- * Club domestic league appearances and goals

Marius Beraru (November 28, 1920 – September 18, 1986) was a Romanian footballer and manager. (Note: Marius Beraru at WorldFootball.net) (Note: Marius Beraru at National-Football-Teams.com)

== International career ==
Marius Beraru made one appearance at international level for Romania, in a friendly which ended 2–2 against Croatia.
