= 1965–66 Divizia A =

48th season of top-tier football league in Romania

Divizia A
- Season: 1965–66
- Champions: Petrolul Ploieşti
- Top goalscorer: Ion Ionescu (24)

The 1965–66 Divizia A was the forty-eighth season of Divizia A, the top-level football league of Romania.

== Teams ==
Location of teams in 1965-66 Divizia A

== League table ==
Pos	Team	Pld	W	D	L	GF	GA	GD	Pts	Qualification or relegation
1	Petrolul Ploiești (C)	26	16	6	4	47	24	+23	38	Qualification to European Cup first round
2	Rapid București	26	15	2	9	46	30	+16	32	
3	Dinamo București	26	10	8	8	45	33	+12	28	
4	Dinamo Pitești	26	12	4	10	46	42	+4	28	Invitation to Inter-Cities Fairs Cup first round
5	Steagul Roșu Brașov	26	12	3	11	40	30	+10	27	
6	CSMS Iași	26	11	5	10	33	37	−4	27	
7	Știința Cluj	26	8	10	8	34	35	−1	26	
8	Știința Craiova	26	9	7	10	23	38	−15	25	
9	Farul Constanța	26	10	4	12	32	37	−5	24	Invitation to Balkans Cup
10	UTA Arad	26	8	8	10	33	40	−7	24	Invitation to Balkans Cup
11	Știința Timișoara	26	10	3	13	26	36	−10	23	
12	Steaua București	26	6	10	10	34	30	+4	22	Qualification to Cup Winners' Cup first round
13	Crișul Oradea (R)	26	6	8	12	26	39	−13	20	Relegation to Divizia B
14	Siderurgistul Galați (R)	26	7	6	13	41	55	−14	20	Relegation to Divizia B

Source: LT
Rules for classification: 1) points; 2) goal difference; 3) number of goals scored
(C) Champions; (R) Relegated

=== Results ===
Home \ Away	IAȘ	CRI	DIN	PIT	FAR	PET	RAP	SID	SRB	STE	UTA	ȘCJ	ȘCR	ȘTI
CSMS Iași	—	0–0	1–2	2–0	1–0	0–0	2–0	3–2	3–0	2–0	2–1	3–3	1–0	3–0
Crișul Oradea	0–2	—	0–0	3–1	1–0	1–1	3–1	4–0	1–2	2–2	1–1	0–0	1–0	3–1
Dinamo București	0–1	3–0	—	1–1	4–3	2–1	0–2	4–0	1–0	1–1	0–1	4–0	8–0	2–3
Dinamo Pitești	4–0	6–0	2–1	—	3–2	1–4	2–1	3–1	2–1	1–0	3–2	1–2	3–1	1–0
Farul Constanța	2–1	2–1	1–1	2–0	—	1–1	0–2	3–1	2–0	1–0	2–0	1–0	4–0	1–0
Petrolul Ploiești	2–1	4–1	2–2	3–2	3–0	—	1–0	3–0	1–0	1–0	4–1	5–1	5–2	1–0
Rapid București	2–0	2–0	0–0	4–2	3–0	2–1	—	1–2	4–1	2–0	4–2	3–2	2–0	2–0
Siderurgistul Galați	6–0	3–0	2–3	1–1	1–1	0–1	1–2	—	4–2	2–2	0–0	0–0	3–1	2–1
Steagul Roșu Brașov	3–0	2–1	4–1	3–0	2–1	0–2	0–2	4–0	—	0–0	6–1	2–0	1–1	3–0
Steaua București	0–0	1–0	3–3	2–3	6–0	0–1	3–2	5–1	0–2	—	1–2	1–0	0–0	1–1
UTA Arad	2–1	1–1	3–0	2–2	2–1	2–0	3–1	2–2	0–1	1–1	—	3–1	1–1	0–0
Știința Cluj	2–2	1–1	2–1	2–2	1–1	5–0	1–1	4–1	1–0	0–0	2–0	—	1–0	2–0
Știința Craiova	3–1	1–0	0–0	1–0	2–1	0–0	1–0	3–1	0–0	2–1	2–0	1–1	—	1–0
Știința Timișoara	3–1	2–1	0–1	1–0	1–0	0–0	3–1	2–5	2–1	0–4	1–0	2–0	3–0	—

Source: LT (in Romanian)
Legend: Blue = home team win; Yellow = draw; Red = away team win.

== Top goalscorers ==
Rank	Player	Club	Goals
1	Ion Ionescu	Rapid București	24
2	Nicolae Nagy	Dinamo Pitești	22
3	Cristian Stătescu	Siderurgistul Galați	15
4	Gheorghe Ene	Dinamo București	12
5	Alexandru Badea	Petrolul Ploiești	11
5	Mircea Dridea	Petrolul Ploiești	11
5	Cornel Pavlovici	Steaua București	11
5	Marin Voinea	Siderurgistul Galați	11

== Champion squad ==
Petrolul Ploiești

Goalkeepers: Mihai Ionescu (26 / 0); Vasile Sfetcu (5 / 0).
Defenders: Gheorghe Pahonțu (26 / 0); Alexandru Boc (26 / 1); Gheorghe Florea (26 / 0); Mihai Mocanu (26 / 0).
Midfielders: Eduard Juhasz (23 / 2); Petre Dragomir (26 / 2); Dumitru Munteanu (3 / 0); Viorel Stoicescu (1 / 0).
Forwards: Emil Frățilă (8 / 4); Ioan Drăgan (8 / 1); Octavian Dincuță (6 / 0); Mircea Dridea (25 / 11); Alexandru Badea (23 / 11); Constantin Moldoveanu (24 / 8); Virgil Dridea (18 / 6); Ion Crișan (4 / 0).
(league appearances and goals listed in brackets)

Manager: Constantin Cernăianu.

== See also ==
- 1965–66 Divizia B
- 1965–66 Divizia C
- 1965–66 Regional Championship
- 1965–66 Cupa României
