= Gheorghe Dumitrașcu =

Romanian footballer

Personal information
- Full name: Gheorghe Iulian Dumitrașcu
- Date of birth: 28 November 1967 (age 58)
- Place of birth: Bilciurești, Romania
- Height: 1.72 m (5 ft 8 in)
- Positions: Central midfielder; attacking midfielder

Senior career*
Years	Team	Apps	(Gls)
1985–1986	CS Târgoviște		
1986–1987	Universitatea Craiova	6	(0)
1987–1988	Dinamo București	9	(0)
1988–1989	Flacăra Moreni	12	(0)
1989–1993	Rapid București (Note: The statistics for the 1989–90 Divizia B season are unavailable.)	84	(9)
1993–1994	Oțelul Galați	27	(3)
1994–1995	Sportul Studențesc București	17	(0)
1995	Győri ETO	11	(0)
1996	Atletic București		
1996	Chindia Târgoviște	16	(2)
1997–1998	Construction Henan		
1998–1999	Chindia Târgoviște	13	(0)
Total		195	(14)

International career
1991	Romania	2	(0)
- * Club domestic league appearances and goals

Gheorghe Iulian Dumitrașcu (born 28 November 1967) is a Romanian former footballer who played as a midfielder.

== International career ==
Gheorghe Dumitrașcu played two friendly games at international level for Romania against Egypt.

== Honours ==
Rapid București

- Divizia B: 1989–90
