= Ion Neacșu =

Romanian footballer (1930–1988)

Personal information
- Date of birth: 19 September 1930
- Place of birth: Ploiești, Romania
- Date of death: 10 May 1988 (aged 57)
- Position: Defender

Youth career
- 1946–1948: Alimentara Ploiești

Senior career*
Years	Team	Apps	(Gls)
1948–1950	Rafinăria 7 Brazi		
1950	CSA București		
1951–1953	Metalul Câmpina		
1954–1962	Petrolul Ploiești (Note: The 1957 championship called Cupa Primăverii is unofficial, so the appearances and goals scored at that competition for Petrolul Ploiești are not official.)	97	(5)
1962–1967	Prahova Ploiești		

International career
1956–1958	Romania	10	(0)
- * Club domestic league appearances and goals

Ion Neacșu (19 September 1930 – 10 May 1988) was a Romanian footballer.

== International career ==
Ion Neacșu played ten international matches for Romania's national team, making his debut in a friendly game which ended with a 0–2 loss against Sweden. He played four games at the 1958 World Cup qualifiers.

== Honours ==
Petrolul Ploiești

- Divizia A: 1957–58, 1958–59
