= Alexandru Fronea =

Romanian footballer

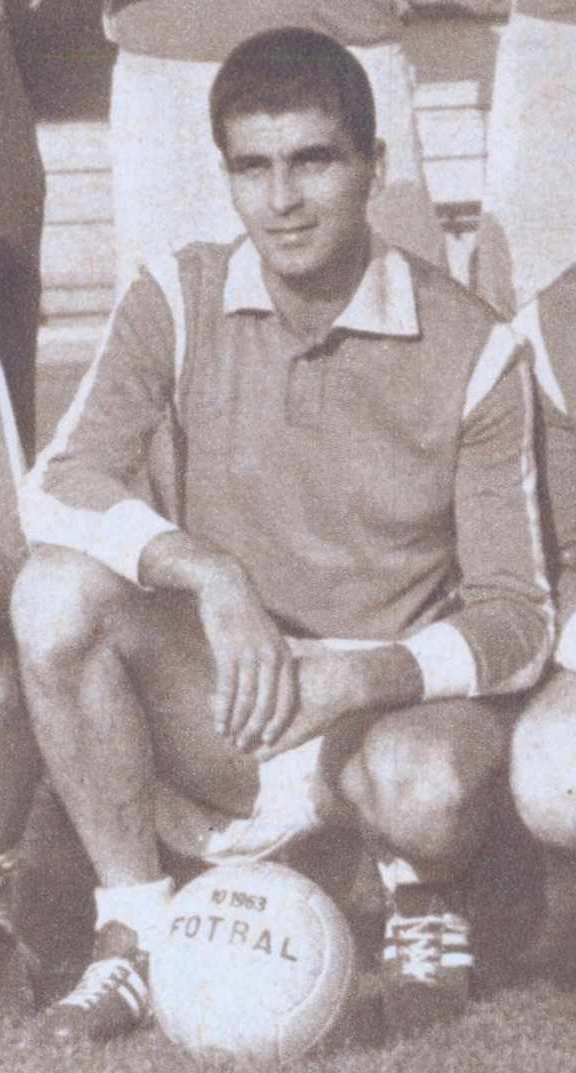

Personal information
- Date of birth: 15 November 1933
- Place of birth: Bucharest, Romania
- Date of death: 10 April 2013 (aged 79)
- Place of death: Ploiești, Romania
- Position: Defender

Youth career
- 1947−1950: Silvicultorul București

Senior career*
Years	Team	Apps	(Gls)
1950−1953	Metalul București		
1955−1957	Progresul Brăila		
1957−1965	Carpaţi Sinaia		
1957−1965	FC Petrolul Ploiești	132	(1)
1965−1966	Metalul Târgovişte		

International career
1960	Romania	1	(0)
- * Club domestic league appearances and goals

Alexandru Fronea (15 November 1933 – 10 April 2013) was a Romanian football defender who played for Romania in the 1960 European Nations' Cup.

== Club career ==
He was a member of FC Petrolul Ploiești's "golden generation". He became national champion two times with Petrolul, in 1958 and 1959 and won the Romanian Cup in 1963.

== International career ==
Fronea earned his one and only cap for the Romania on 29 May 1960 in a European Nations' Cup qualifying match against Czechoslovakia.

== Honours ==
Petrolul Ploiești

- Divizia A: 1957–58, 1958–59
- Cupa României: 1962–63
