= Gheorghe Pahonțu =

Romanian footballer and manager

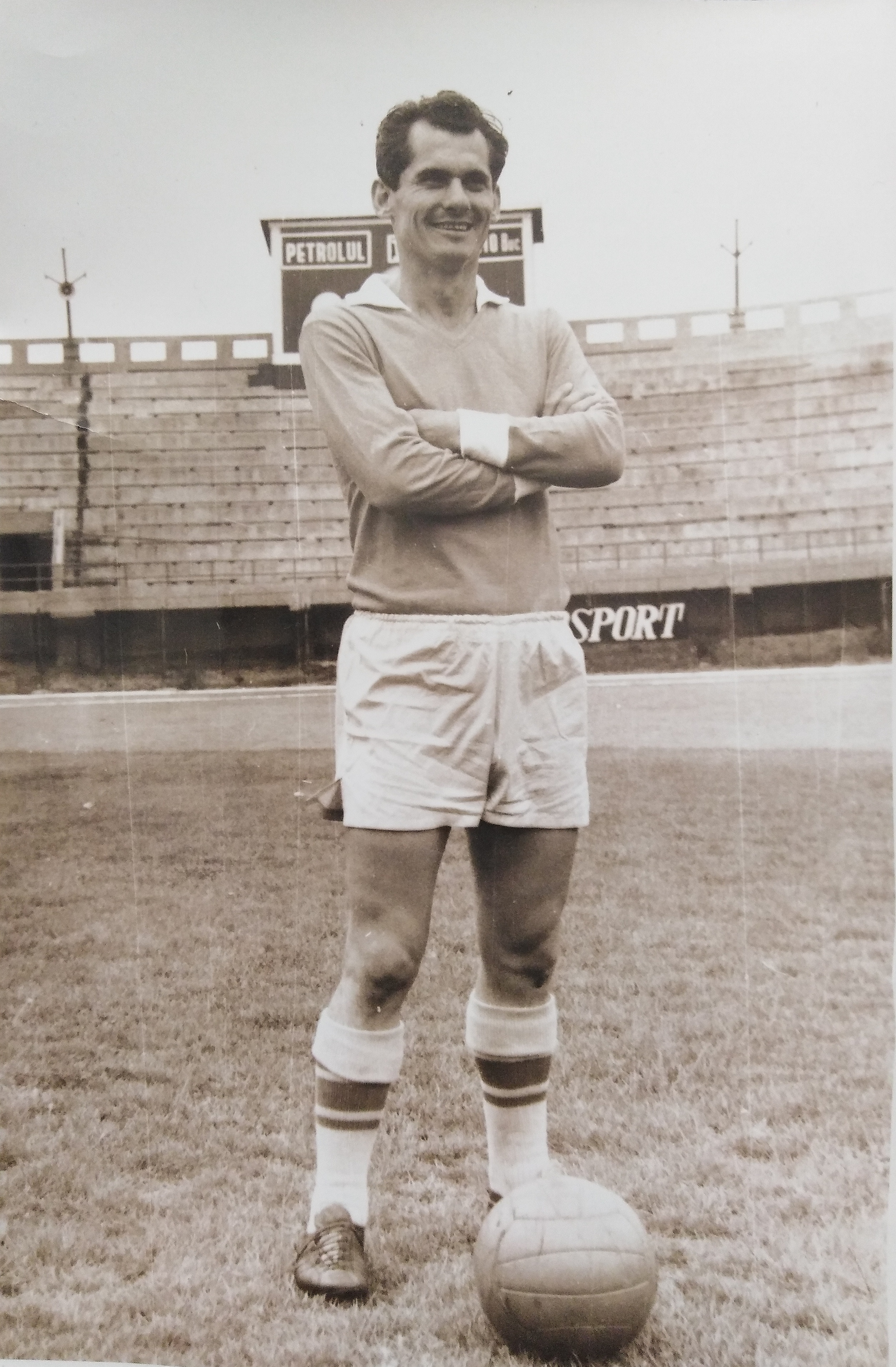

Personal information
- Date of birth: 17 July 1933
- Place of birth: Ploiești, Kingdom of Romania
- Date of death: 21 October 1991 (aged 58)
- Place of death: Ploiești, Romania
- Position: Right back

Youth career
- Metalul 1 Mai Ploiești

Senior career*
Years	Team	Apps	(Gls)
- Metalul 1 Mai Ploiești
1951–1969	Petrolul Ploiești (Note: The statistics for the 1953 Divizia B season are unavailable.)	298	(7)

International career
1955	Romania	4	(0)

Managerial career
- 1974: Victoria Roman
- 1974: Ceahlăul Piatra Neamț
- 1974–1975: Victoria Roman
- 1975–1976: CFR Făurei
- 1976–1977: Petrolul Teleajen
- 1977–: Caraimanul Bușteni
- Petrolul Băicoi
- * Club domestic league appearances and goals

Gheorghe Pahonțu (17 July 1933 - 19 October 1991) was a Romanian football right defender and manager.

== International career ==
Gheorghe Pahonțu played four friendly games at international level for Romania, making his debut in a 1–0 victory against Norway.

== Honours ==
=== Player ===
Petrolul Ploiești

- Divizia A: 1957–58, 1958–59, 1965–66
- Divizia B: 1953
- Cupa României: 1962–63, runner-up 1952
