= Ilie Oană =

Romanian footballer and manager (1918–1993)

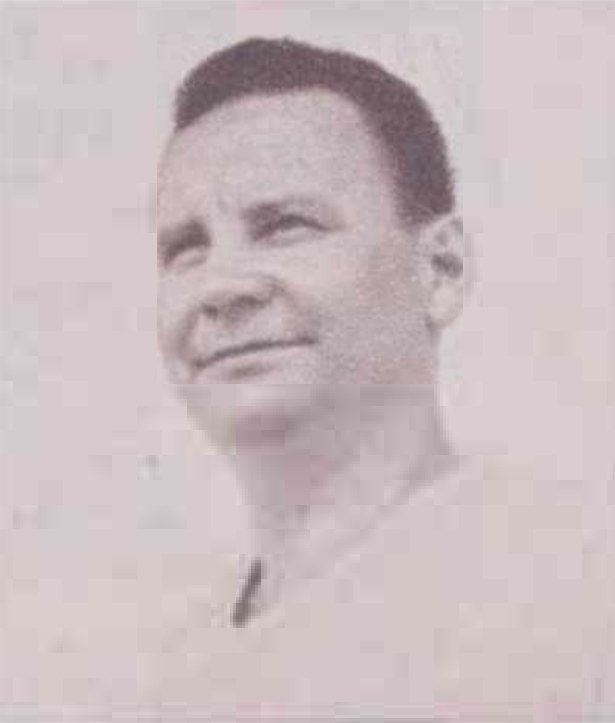
- Oană pictured in 1966

Personal information
- Date of birth: 16 August 1918
- Place of birth: Indiana Harbor, United States
- Date of death: 27 April 1993 (aged 74)
- Place of death: Bucharest, Romania
- Position: Midfielder

Youth career
- Șoimii Sibiu

Senior career*
| Years | Team | Apps | (Gls) |
| 1935–1937 | Șoimii Sibiu | | |
| 1937–1951 | Juventus București (Note: The Divizia A 1940–41 was the last season before World War II and the Divizia A 1946–47 was the first one after, so the appearances and goals scored during this period for Juventus București are not official with the exception of the 1945–46 regional championship, also the statistics for the 1950 and 1951 Divizia A seasons are unavailable.) | 143 | (56) |

International career
| 1939–1948 | Romania | 2 | (0) |

Managerial career
- 1952–1964: Petrolul Ploiești
- 1962–1963: Romania (assistant)
- 1965–1967: Romania
- 1968–1969: Petrolul Ploiești
- 1969–1971: Panserraikos
- 1971–1973: Petrolul Ploiești
- 1973–1977: Politehnica Iași
- 1978: Universitatea Craiova
- 1979–1980: Farul Constanța
- 1980: Gloria Buzău
- * Club domestic league appearances and goals

Ilie Oană (16 August 1918 – 27 April 1993) was a US-born Romanian association football player and manager.

== Club career ==
Oană was born on 16 August 1918, and was nicknamed "Americanul" (The American) because his birthplace was in Indiana Harbor to Romanian parents who emigrated from Transylvania before the outbreak of World War I. In 1921, his parents moved back to their homeland, settling in Sibiu after the 1918 Union of Transylvania with Romania. Oană began his football career in 1935 with local side Șoimii Sibiu in Divizia B. He then joined Divizia A club, Juventus București where he made his debut under player-coach Coloman Braun-Bogdan on 12 September 1937 in a 6–2 away loss to Universitatea Cluj. In the following years, Oană was an important member of the team, consolidating his place in the first XI, but the team's results were poorer season after season, eventually being relegated at the end of the 1939–40 season. Oană stayed with the club, helping it get promoted after one season by contributing with nine goals scored in seven appearances. However, the team did not get to play in the following season in Divizia A as the championship was interrupted due to World War II. In the first season after the war, Oană played 14 games in the 1945–46 București regional championship, scoring 11 goals that helped Juventus earn a position that granted participation in the 1946–47 Divizia A season. He continued to play Divizia A football for Juventus until his retirement in 1951.

== International career ==
Oană made two appearances for Romania, making his debut on 22 October 1939 under coach Virgil Economu in a 2–2 friendly draw against Hungary. He also played in a 0–0 draw against Poland in the 1948 Balkan Cup.

== Managerial career ==
"His greatest quality was that he knew how to build a team. He never selected players by chance. He didn't have nine stars out of eleven. He always had the courage to promote footballers. He rarely brought in players of great quality. He was always looking to develop and promote young players."

— Mircea Dridea, ex-Petrolul Ploiești player, on his former coach.

Shortly after retiring from playing in 1952, Oană became a football coach at Juventus, the club where he ended his career, which was renamed Petrolul and moved from Bucharest to Ploiești. In his first season, Petrolul was relegated to Divizia B. With the help of the coach from the youth center, Traian Ionescu, he created a new team by promoting young players such as the Dridea brothers, Mircea and Virgil, Vasile Sfetcu and Constantin Tabarcea and mixing them with talents he discovered in the lower leagues like Ion Zaharia and Ion Neacșu. Thus he formed a squad that would get promoted back to the first league in 1954 and win two consecutive Divizia A titles in the 1957–58 and 1958–59 seasons. He also won the 1962–63 Cupa României after a 6–1 victory against Siderurgistul Galați in the final. In the 1962–63 Inter-Cities Fairs Cup they reached the quarter-finals, a premiere for a Romanian team in European competitions, where they were eliminated by Ferencváros.

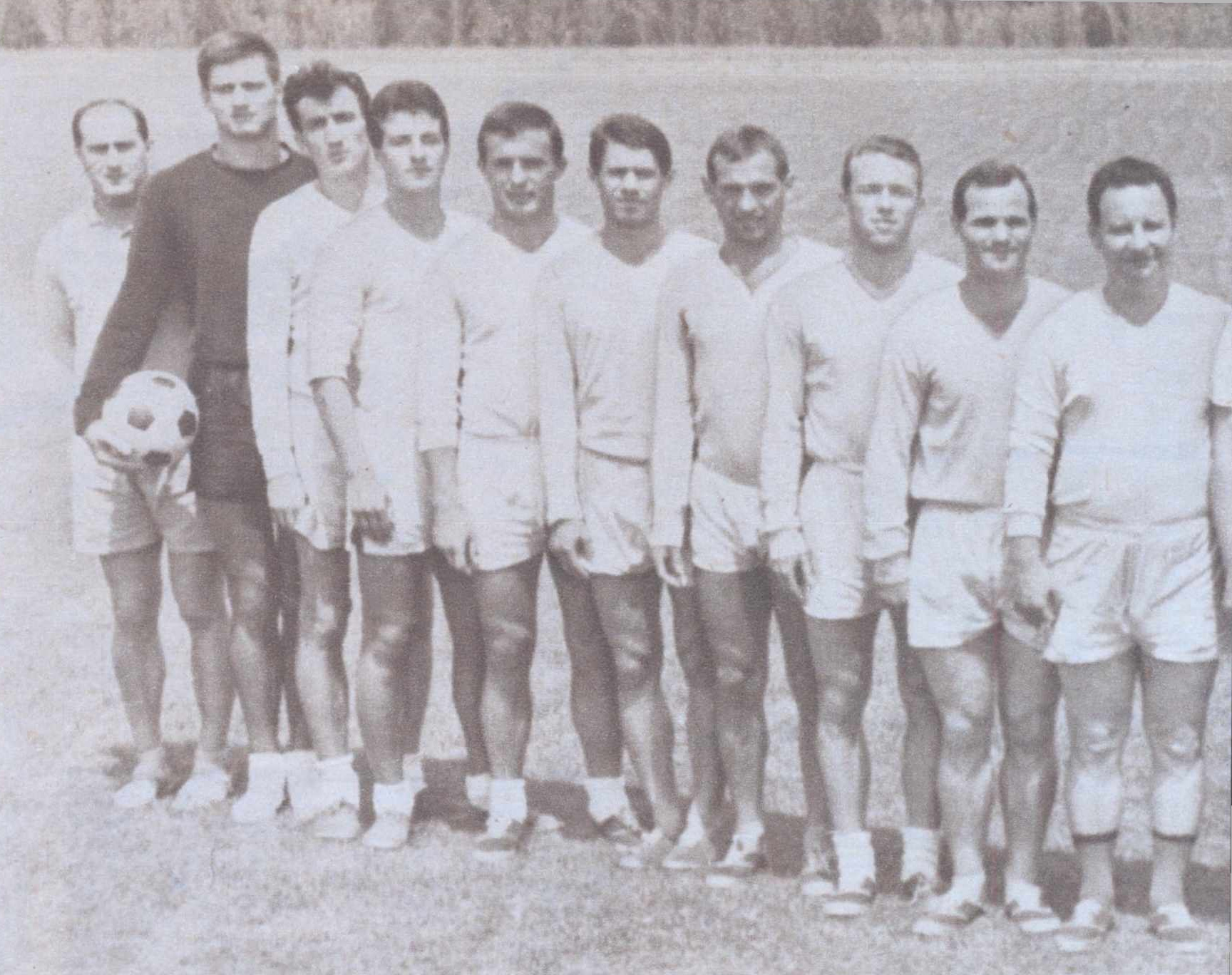
Oană (first from the right) as coach of Romania at the Snagov training ground in 1965

Oană left Petrolul after 12 years to coach Romania's national team for which he previously worked as an assistant of Gheorghe Popescu and Silviu Ploeșteanu from 1962 until 1963. He made his debut in a 3–0 home victory against Turkey in the 1966 World Cup qualifiers. During his two-year spell, Romania managed to earn victories against Czechoslovakia, Portugal, Switzerland and France, but was dismissed after the "Zürich disaster" where he was defeated with 7–1 by Switzerland in the Euro 1968 qualifiers. Oană has a total of 19 games at the national team consisting of 11 victories and 8 losses.

He returned to coach The Yellow Wolves in the second half of the 1967–68 Divizia A season, the team finishing the season in fifth place and in the following one they barely avoided relegation in the final round of the season. From 1969 until 1971, Oană had his only experience coaching abroad in Greece at Alpha Ethniki side, Panserraikos. Subsequently, he returned for a third and final spell at Petrolul, leaving the team after two seasons in which it earned mediocre results. He then coached Politehnica Iași for four seasons from 1973 until 1977. In January 1978, he was appointed coach at Universitatea Craiova, winning the 1977–78 Cupa României after a 3–1 victory against Olimpia Satu Mare in the final. He ended his coaching career in Divizia B with two unsuccessful spells at Farul Constanța and Gloria Buzău, being unable to help them get promoted to the first league. Oană has a total of 572 matches as a coach in Divizia A consisting of 232 victories, 124 draws and 216 losses, which makes him the second coach with the most matches in the league, behind Florin Halagian who has 878.

== Death ==
He died on 27 April 1993 in Bucharest, Romania at age 74. The Ilie Oană Stadium in Ploiești was named in his honor, and a statue of Oană was displayed in front of it.

== Honours ==
=== Player ===
Juventus București

- Divizia B: 1940–41

=== Manager ===
Petrolul Ploiești

- Divizia A: 1957–58, 1958–59
- Divizia B: 1954
- Cupa României: 1962–63

Universitatea Craiova

- Cupa României: 1977–78
