= Constantin Tabarcea =

Romanian footballer

Personal information
- Date of birth: 8 February 1937
- Place of birth: Târgoviște, Romania
- Date of death: 14 July 1963 (aged 26)
- Place of death: Ploiești, Romania
- Positions: Midfielder; winger

Youth career
- 1951–1955: Metalul Târgoviște

Senior career*
Years	Team	Apps	(Gls)
1955–1963	Petrolul Ploiești	162	(25)

International career
1958–1959	Romania U23	4	(0)
1959–1961	Romania B	2	(0)
- * Club domestic league appearances and goals

Constantin Tabarcea (8 February 1937 – 14 July 1963) was a Romanian footballer who played as a midfielder.

== Career ==
On 14 July 1963 he collapsed and died during a match Divizia A match against Dinamo Bacău. Death was attributed to unusual activity of the thymus. He was 26 years old. One week later after his death Petrolul won the 1962–63 Cupa României and before the game, at the team photo, the place from the down row in front of goalkeeper Mihai Ionescu was left free in his memory. In 2013, in his honor, at the initiative of his former teammates, the authorities mounted a commemorative plaque at the entrance of the Ilie Oană Stadium that says: "He was a delicate, sensitive boy with a special sense of the rules of life. (...) As a footballer he was a great talent, a ball tamer who listened to him in submission, doing with the ball whatever he wanted. At Petrolul he played the role of the "wanderer winger" who processed most of the balls recovered from the defense to be transmitted to the attackers. (...) He had all the qualities of a great player, the eye, the speed of thought, dedication, shot well placed". The footballer Adrian Tabarcea Petre and his father are named Tabarcea because his grandfather was a friend of Constantin.

== Honours ==
Petrolul Ploiești

- Divizia A: 1957–58, 1958–59
- Cupa României: 1962–63
