= Mihai Mocanu =

Romanian footballer (1942–2009)

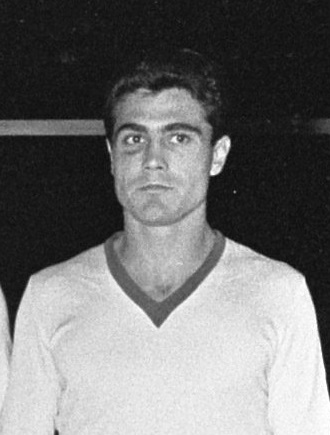
- Mocanu with Petrolul Ploiești in 1966

Personal information
- Date of birth: 24 February 1942
- Place of birth: Constanța, Romania
- Date of death: 18 June 2009 (aged 67)
- Place of death: Constanța, Romania
- Height: 1.76 m (5 ft 9 in)
- Position: Defender

Youth career
- 1952–1956: Locomotiva Constanța
- 1956–1958: Rafinăria Câmpina
- 1959–1960: Electrica Constanța

Senior career*
Years	Team	Apps	(Gls)
1960–1962	SNM Constanța		
1962–1963	Chimia Făgăraș		
1963–1972	Petrolul Ploiești	201	(6)
1972–1974	Omonia Nicosia	8 (Note: The statistics for the 1973–74 Cypriot First Division season are not available.)	(0)
1974–1976	Petrolul Ploiești		
Total		209	(6)

International career
1966–1971	Romania (Note: Including 2 appearances for Romania's Olympic team.)	33	(0)

Managerial career
- 1975: Petrolul Ploiești
- Steaua Mizil
- 1984–1986: Metalul Plopeni
- 1991–2005: Conpet Ploiești
- * Club domestic league appearances and goals

Mihai Mocanu (24 February 1942 – 18 June 2009) was a Romanian professional footballer who played as a defender.

== Club career ==
Mocanu was born on 24 February 1942 in Constanța, Romania and began playing football in 1952 at local club Locomotiva. He then played for Rafinăria Câmpina before returning to his hometown's Electrica to conclude his junior career. In 1960 he started his senior career at SNM Constanța, playing for two seasons in Divizia B, subsequently going for one season at Chimia Făgăraș in the same league.

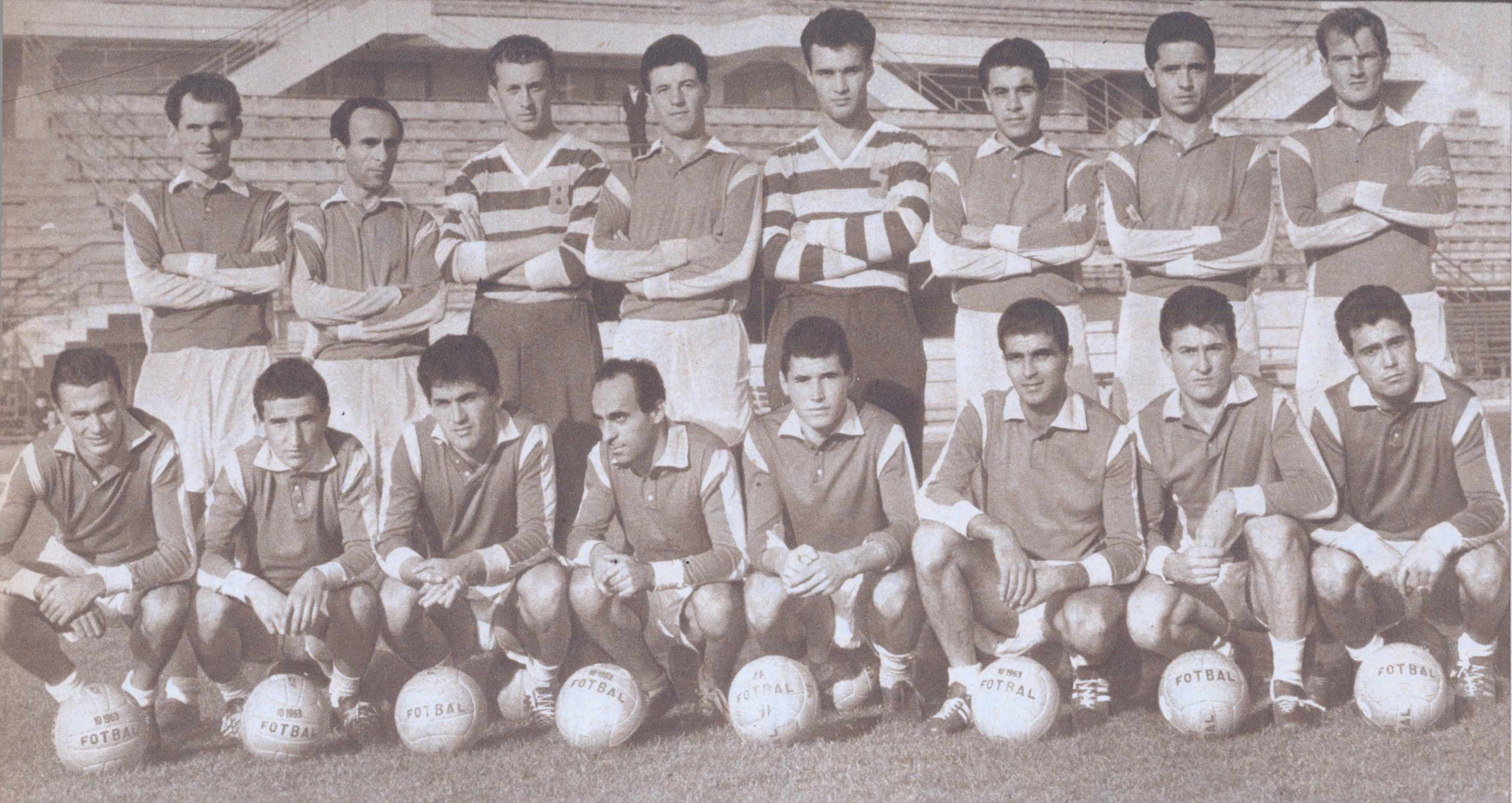
Mocanu (front row, first from the right) with Petrolul in 1963

Mocanu joined Petrolul Ploiești, making his Divizia A debut on 25 August 1963 under coach Ilie Oană in a 2–1 away loss to UTA Arad. He helped the Yellow Wolves win the 1965–66 title, being used by coach Constantin Cernăianu in 26 matches. He played three games for Petrolul in the first round of the 1966–67 European Cup against Liverpool that included a 3–1 victory, but they did not manage to qualify to the next round. Mocanu also appeared in five games in which he scored one goal over the course of two seasons in the Inter-Cities Fairs Cup. On 12 December 1971, he made his last Divizia A appearance in Petrolul's 1–0 home loss to Jiul Petroșani, totaling 201 appearances with six goals in the competition. Afterwards, Mocanu went to play in Cyprus at Omonia Nicosia for two seasons with fellow Romanian Constantin Frățilă, winning the title and the cup in 1974. He returned in Romania, playing another two seasons for Petrolul, this time in Divizia B, retiring in 1976.

== International career ==
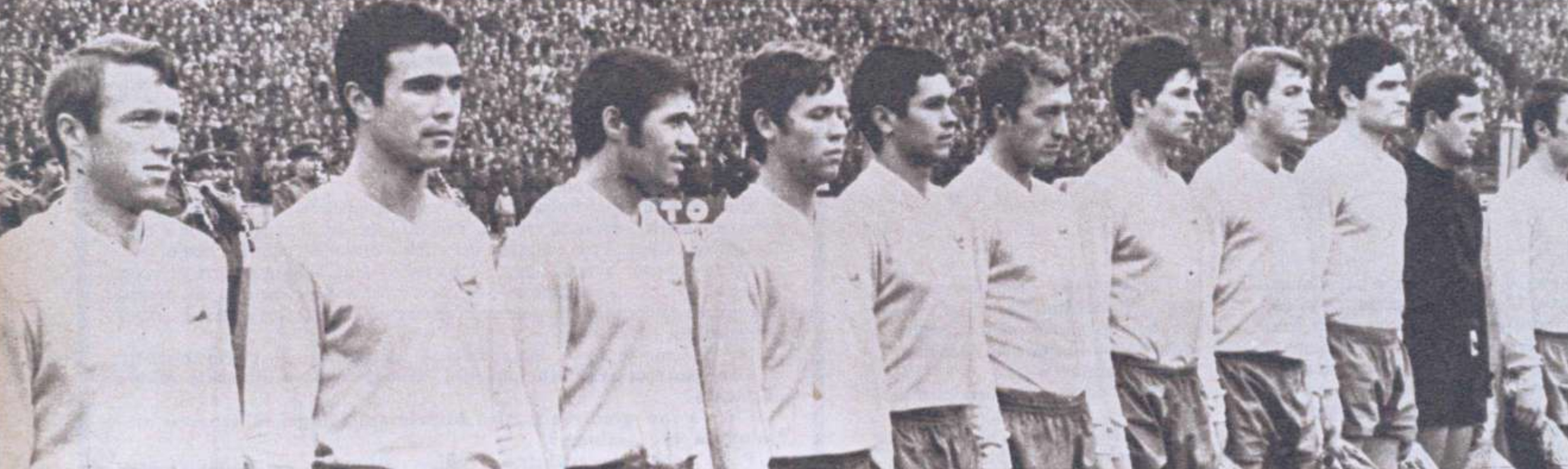
Mocanu (second from the left) with Romania ahead of their friendly match against England in 1968

Mocanu played 31 games for Romania, making his debut on 1 June 1966 under coach Ilie Oană in a 1–0 friendly loss to West Germany. He played four games in the Euro 1968 qualifiers and two during the successful 1970 World Cup qualifiers. Coach Angelo Niculescu used him for the entirety of all three games in the 1970 World Cup final tournament which were a win against Czechoslovakia and losses to England and Brazil, as his side failed to progress from their group. In the 3–2 loss against the Brazilians, Mocanu's performance was appreciated in the duel with his direct opponent Jairzinho. He played three matches during the 1972 Euro qualifiers, including his last appearance that took place on 22 September 1971 in a 4–0 away victory against Finland.

For representing his country at the 1970 World Cup, Mocanu was decorated by President of Romania Traian Băsescu on 25 March 2008 with the Ordinul "Meritul Sportiv" – (The Medal "The Sportive Merit") class III.

== Managerial career ==
Mocanu coached Petrolul Ploiești for one year in Divizia B, and also worked at the club's youth center. During his coaching career, he worked for Steaua Mizil and Metalul Plopeni, and from 1991 until 2005, he coached Conpet Ploiești, with all these spells occurring in the Romanian lower leagues.

== Personal life and death ==
His son was also a footballer, playing for a while at Conpet Ploiești with his father as coach. Mocanu received the Honorary Citizen of Ploiești title.

In July 2006, part of Mocanu's right leg was amputated after he was diagnosed with ischemia. He died on 18 June 2009, at the age of 67.

== Honours ==
Petrolul Ploiești

- Divizia A: 1965–66

Omonia Nicosia

- Cypriot League: 1973–74
- Cypriot Cup: 1973–74
