= 1957–58 Divizia A =

40th season of top-tier football league in Romania

Divizia A
- Season: 1957–58
- Champions: Petrolul Ploieşti
- Top goalscorer: Ion Ciosescu (21)

The 1957–58 Divizia A was the fortieth season of Divizia A, the top-level football league of Romania.

== Teams ==
Location of teams in 1957-58 Divizia A

== League table ==
Pos	Team	Pld	W	D	L	GF	GA	GD	Pts	Qualification or relegation
1	Petrolul Ploiești (C)	22	12	3	7	36	22	+14	27	Qualification to European Cup preliminary round
2	CCA București	22	11	5	6	41	27	+14	27	Qualification to 1958 Danube Cup
3	Știința Timișoara	22	11	5	6	49	38	+11	27	Qualification to 1958 Danube Cup
4	Progresul București	22	13	0	9	55	31	+24	26	
5	Minerul Petroșani	22	11	4	7	27	19	+8	26	
6	Dinamo București	22	10	4	8	33	26	+7	24	
7	Steagul Roşu Oraşul Stalin	22	9	5	8	37	33	+4	23	
8	Locomotiva București	22	9	4	9	25	25	0	22	
9	Dinamo Cluj	22	9	2	11	34	41	−7	20	
10	UTA Arad	22	7	6	9	30	47	−17	20	
11	Energia Recolta Târgu Mureş (R)	22	7	3	12	23	42	−19	17	Relegation to Divizia B
12	Progresul Oradea (R)	22	1	3	18	16	55	−39	5	Relegation to Divizia B

Source: LT
Rules for classification: 1) points; 2) goal average; 3) number of goals scored
(C) Champions; (R) Relegated

=== Results ===
Home \ Away	CCA	DIN	CLU	RTM	LBU	MIP	PET	PRO	ORA	STG	UTA	ȘTI
CCA București	—	2–0	6–0	3–0	1–3	3–1	3–0	3–1	3–1	2–2	1–1	1–4
Dinamo București	3–2	—	0–1	1–0	0–1	0–1	0–1	2–1	3–0	1–1	0–1	2–6
Dinamo Cluj	1–2	0–1	—	4–0	2–1	2–1	1–2	1–2	3–0	4–3	7–1	1–4
Energia Recolta Târgu Mureş	1–1	2–0	3–1	—	1–0	1–0	1–1	1–2	1–1	0–3	3–2	2–1
Locomotiva București	0–0	0–4	1–1	2–0	—	1–0	0–0	0–2	1–0	3–4	2–0	2–0
Minerul Petroșani	0–2	0–1	4–0	2–0	1–0	—	1–0	1–0	1–0	3–0	0–0	2–1
Petrolul Ploiești	1–0	0–0	2–1	5–1	0–2	0–1	—	2–1	3–1	0–1	6–2	2–0
Progresul București	1–2	5–3	2–3	1–0	2–1	3–2	4–5	—	6–0	2–0	7–0	7–0
Progresul Oradea	0–3	0–3	0–1	2–3	1–2	1–1	1–0	1–3	—	1–2	1–3	2–2
Steagul Roşu Oraşul Stalin	3–0	1–4	0–0	1–2	2–2	0–0	0–3	3–1	5–0	—	2–0	0–1
UTA Arad	1–1	1–1	3–0	2–1	2–1	2–3	0–3	0–2	2–0	2–1	—	3–3
Știința Timișoara	3–0	2–2	3–0	5–2	2–0	2–2	1–0	1–0	4–3	2–3	2–2	—

Source: LT (in Romanian)
Legend: Blue = home team win; Yellow = draw; Red = away team win.

== Top goalscorers ==
Rank	Player	Club	Goals
1	Ion Ciosescu	Știința Timișoara	21
2	Ion Alecsandrescu	CCA București	15
3	Viorel Mateianu	Progresul București	13
4	Zoltan David	Steagul Roşu Oraşul Stalin	12
4	Gheorghe Fusulan	Steagul Roşu Oraşul Stalin	12
4	Nicolae Oaidă	Progresul București	12
4	Ion Zaharia	Petrolul Ploiești	12

== Champion squad ==
Petrolul Ploiești

Goalkeepers: Adalbert Marosi (1 / 0); Vasile Sfetcu (17 / 0); Constantin Roman (4 / 0).
Defenders: Gheorghe Pahonțu (19 / 0); Nicolae Marinescu (22 / 0); Nicolae Topșa (19 / 0).
Midfielders: Gheorghe Florea (7 / 0); Alexandru Fronea (18 / 0); Daniel Peretz (5 / 0); Ion Neacșu (21 / 4).
Forwards: Ion Zaharia (22 / 12); Constantin Tabarcea (22 / 2); Mircea Dridea (11 / 4); Gheorghe Dumitrescu (17 / 8); Dumitru Munteanu (11 / 3); Gheorghe Marin (8 / 2); Pavel Bădulescu-Bardatz (18 / 1).
(league appearances and goals listed in brackets)

Manager: Ilie Oană.

== See also ==
- 1957–58 Divizia B
