= FC Prahova Ploiești =

Romanian football club

Prahova Ploiești
- Full name: Fotbal Club Prahova Ploiești
- Nicknames: Prahovenii (The People from Prahova); Galben-Albaștrii (The Yellow and Blues)
- Short name: Prahova
- Founded: 1909; 117 years ago
- Ground: Various grounds and stadiums during its 112 years of existence
- League: not active at senior level
Home colours	Away colours

Fotbal Club Prahova Ploiești, (Romanian pronunciation: [ˈprahova ploˈjeʃtʲ]), commonly known as Prahova Ploiești or simply as Prahova, is a Romanian football club based in Ploiești, Prahova County. Prahova was founded in 1909 under the name of United Ploiești and it soon became one of the best teams in the country, winning two Romanian Championships in 1912 and 1916. Following the world wars, Prahova mostly played in the second and third divisions of Romanian football and was involved in a match-fixing scandal in the 1960s. Being unable to build on its early successes, the club was dissolved in 2001 after years of severe mismanagement, before being refounded in 2018.

After the 2019–2020 season, the men's team no longer competes in any senior level competition, though a women's team currently competing in Liga II under the name ACS Prahova Ploiesti claims successorship to the original club.

== History ==
The club was founded in 1909 as United Ploiești by the American and Dutch functionaries of the city's petroleum refineries, under the presidency of engineer Jacob Koppes. The first players of the club were Braizer, the Mayor brothers, Bider, Kolman, van Beck, Meyer and Bolton. In 1911, the first Romanian player appears in the squad, Vintilescu. At the end of the 1911–12 season, the club were crowned champions for the first time, beating Olympia București 6–2 at home. The team from Bucharest fielded only 9 players however, because the two other players were still underage, and their parents did not allow them to attend the game. From 1914 on, the foreign players left the country and United saw itself dissolved just before World War I started. The remaining players and staff were divided between two clubs, Româno-Americană București and the eventual successor club Prahova Ploiești, founded in 1915 by United's former president Jacob Koppes. In 1915–16, the team won the national title once again, before competition stopped due to World War I. At the time, the crest of the club showed a black goat and the jersey colours were blue-yellow-white.

After the war, Prahova resumed its activity, playing alongside teams from Bucharest. Between 1919 and 1921, it participated in the national championship. When the Romanian championship format was changed to a single-elimination tournament between the champions of the regional leagues, Prahova first competed in the Bucharest region from 1921 to 1930 but faild to qualify for the final round. When the regional divisions were reformed in 1930, it was placed in the new Southern League. Prahova went on to win the Southern League in its inaugural season with the players Zaharescu – Barasch, Ionescu, Nălae – Vasilescu (Muller), Dancher, Popescu, Obretcovici, Rheingruber, Georgescu, Taryan, I. Niculescu and Atanasiu. In the subsequent national championship of 1930–31, the team was eliminated by UD Reșița in the semi-final, losing 2–3.

Starting with 1934, Prahova played in the second division (1934–1936), then in the third division (1936–1937) and again in the second division from 1937 to 1941. Among the players used before the outbrak of World War II were Iordăchescu, Șenchea, Dunăreanu, Rusen, Gh. Dragomirescu, Grun, Pascaru, Epure, T. Georgescu, Bujor, Farkas, Criciotoiu, Boldiș and Radu Florian. During the war period, the club fielded players including Ioanid, Panovschi, Boacă, Șperlea, Bușac, T. Păunescu, I. Manolescu, N. Antonescu, V. Bărbulescu, Lipănescu, E. Vlaiculescu, Gh. Ionescu and R. Gologan.

In 1946, after a double play-off match against Gloria CFR Galați (3–0, 2–1), the team returned to Divizia A. The players used were C. Mihăilescu, Balmuș, Hrisafi, Matroc, Șt. Comănescu, Boacă, Vâlvoi II, Catană, M. Beraru, Mladin, Comșa, M. Ionescu, Șt. Georgescu, Mazăre, Gologan, Vlaiculescu, Deliu and Mihăescu. The management securing the promotion consisted of B. Andrei, Gh. Marinescu, N. Stanbolgiu, Tr. Stoenescu, Tr. Popescu. After only one season, Prahova was relegated to the second division again, after which it merged with Concordia, the team of a factory from Ploiești with the same name. New players in the squad were Asadur, Ștefănescu, Mincea, Teașcă, Șt. Vasile, Mărdărescu, Chilea, Gârlea, Gh. Ionescu, Moldoveanu, Bădulescu-Bardatz, Motronea and Sanilovici.

In the following years, the team remained in the second division, but competed under the names Partizanul (1950), Flacăra (1951–1953), Metalul (1954), Flacăra 1 Mai (1955), Metalul 1 Mai (1956) and Energia 1 Mai (1956–1958), before returning to its traditional name Prahova in 1958.

At the end of the 1962–1963 season, the team was excluded from the second division and relegated to the local championship due to a match-fixing scandal and repeated violent incidents in its stadium.

In 1968, Prahova was promoted back to the third division and in 1975 to the second division. After two solid seasons finishing seventh in 1976 and eighth the year after, the club was relegated to the third division again in 1978, finishing last in its series. After narrowly missing out on promotion as second both in 1980 and in 1981, Prahova returned to the second division once again in 1982. Before the start of the 1984 season, the club changed its name to Prahova CSU. Throughout the rest of the 1980s, the club remained a staple of the second division, while mostly battling relegation. After achieving its best result of that period, a fourth place in 1988, the club once again changed its name to Prahova Ploiești the same year. However, another period of decline followed, and after avoiding relegation in 1990, the team's ninth consecutive season in the second division marked its demotion to the third tier. Failing to secure promotion in the following years, the club was relegated to the regional championship in 1995 for the first time in almost 30 years. Struggling to find financial or material support, the club merged with the police club Dinamo Argus Ploiești in 1997, changing its name to Prahova Argus Ploiești. In 2000, the club was moved to Urlați before being dissolved the year after.

In August 2018, the club was refounded and enrolled in Liga C – Prahova (Mizil Series), the equivalent of the 7th tier. It finished the season in second place, securing promotion to the 6th tier league Liga B – Prahova, East Series. From the 2019–2020 season on however, the men's team stopped competing on a senior level in the Prahova regional divisions. A women's team currently competing in Liga II under the name ACS Prahova Ploiesti claims to be the successor of the original Prahova Ploiesti though, using an only slightly modified badge.

== Grounds ==
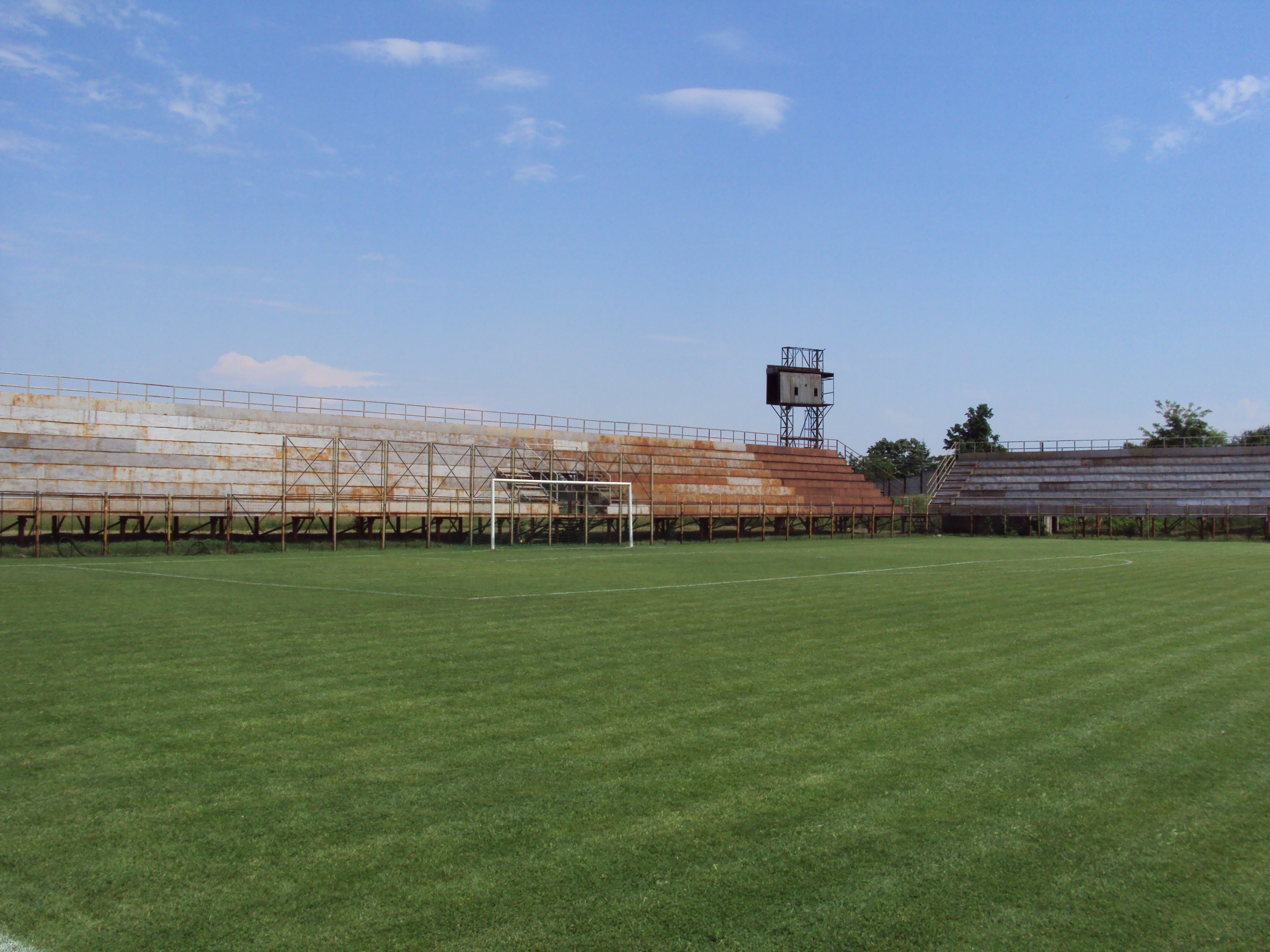
Prahova Stadium, original home ground of the club.

Prahova Ploiești used to play its home matches on Prahova Stadium in Ploiești, with a capacity of 4,000 places. After the 2001 dissolution of the club, the stadium was bought by Ioan Niculae, owner of Astra Giurgiu and used by this club as a secondary ground. After the 2018 refoundation, Prahova negotiated to move back to its home ground, but the negotiations failed, so it first played in Conpet Stadium in Strejnicu, with a capacity of 1,732 seats, then in Voința Stadium in Ciorani, with a capacity of 1,000 seats.

== Honours ==
Liga I:

- Winners (2): 1911–12, 1915–16
- Runners-up (1): 1910–11

Liga III:

- Winners (2): 1974–75, 1981–82
- Runners-up (2): 1979–80, 1980–81

Liga a IV-a Prahova

- Winners (2): 1953, 1967–68

Prahova District Championship

- Winners (4): 1930–31, 1932–33, 1933–34, 1945–46

Liga VII – Prahova County:

- Runners-up (1): 2018–19

== Former managers ==
- (Romania) László Raffinsky (1944–1946)
- (Romania) Andrei Sepci (1948–1949)
- (Romania) László Raffinsky (1953)
- (Romania) Nicolae Drăgan (1958–1959)
- (Romania) Florea Fătu (1960–1963)
- (Romania) Alexandru Fronea (1970–1972)
- (Romania) Romeo Catană (1974–1976)
- (Romania) Romeo Catană (1977–1979)
- (Romania) Constantin Moldoveanu (1981–1982)
- (Romania) Mircea Dridea (1984–1985)
- (Romania) Virgil Dridea (1985–1988)
- (Romania) Constantin Moldoveanu (1988–1994)
