= Siderurgistul Galați =

- Full name: Siderurgistul Galați
- Short name: Siderurgistul
- Founded: 1955 as Dinamo Galați
- Dissolved: 1967
- Ground: Siderurgistul
- Capacity: 6,000

Siderurgistul Galați was a football club based in Galaţi, Romania. It was founded in 1955 and dissolved in 1967.

== History ==
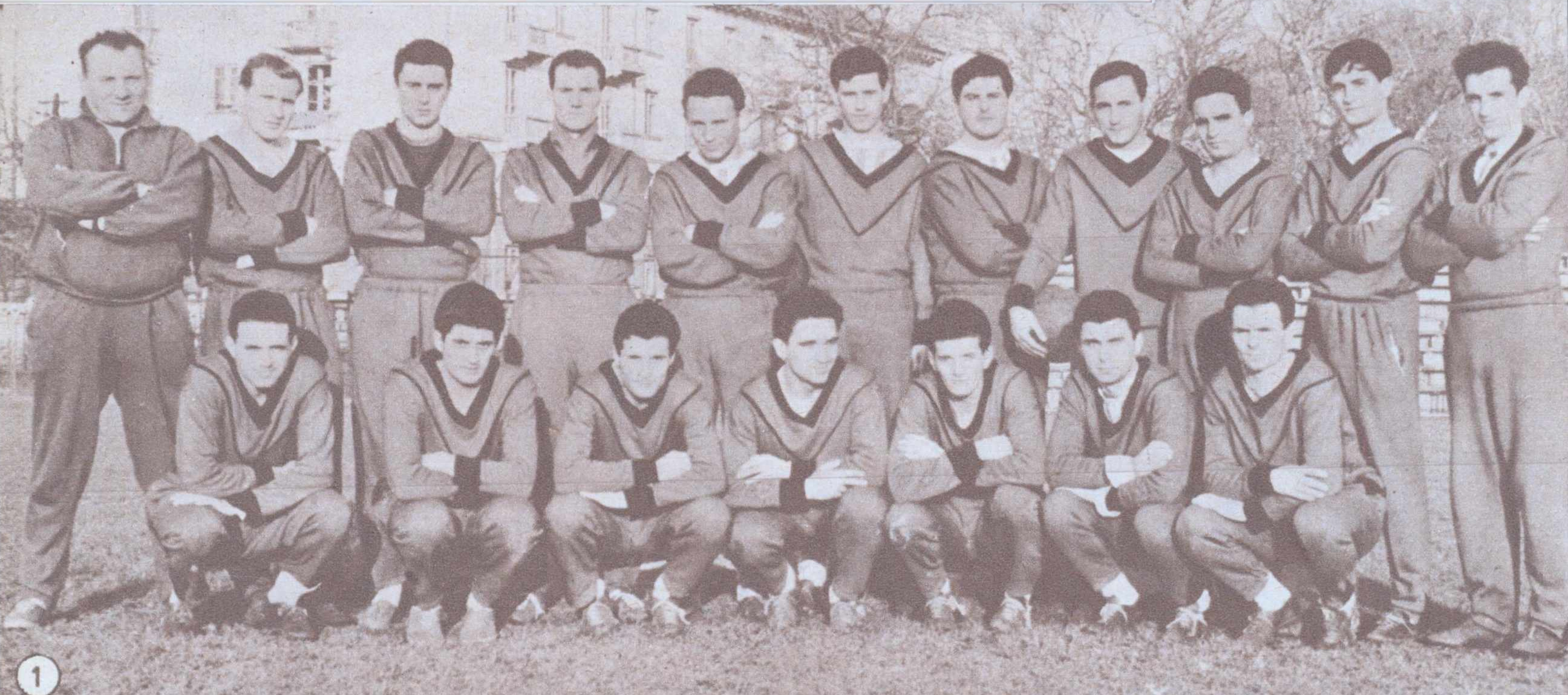
CSO Galați squad in 1962.

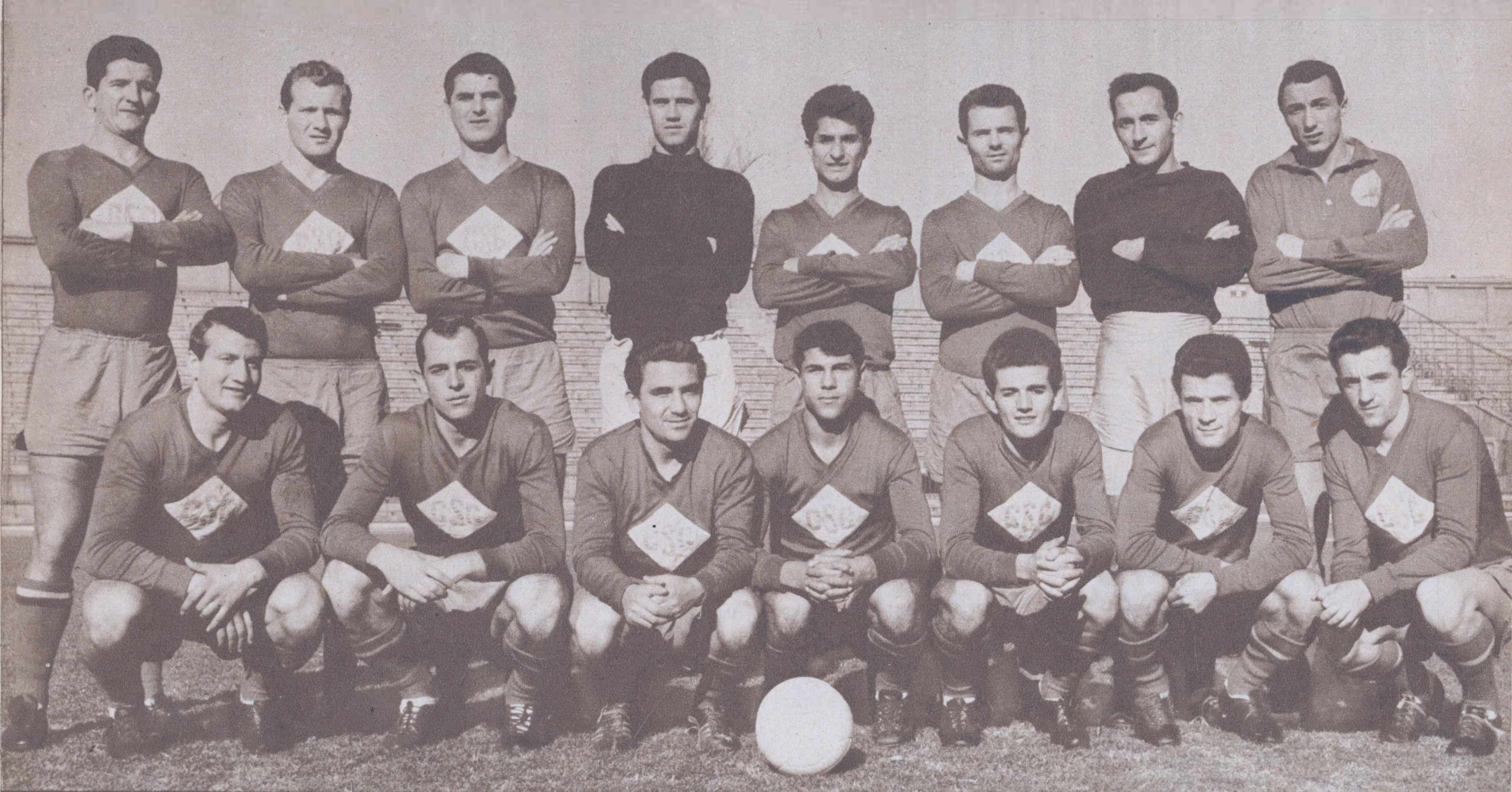
Siderurgistul squad in 1963.

The club was founded in 1955 as Dinamo Galați and in 1961 it was renamed to CSO Galați, and afterwards to Siderurgistul in 1962, with the following players: Dan, Câmpean, Lupea, Hulea, Stănescu, Dumitru Ionel, Coman I, Oprea, Costache, Militaru, Voicu, I. Gheorghe, Matei, Dărăban, Zagardan, David, Dragomir.

In 1963, Siderurgistul promoted to the Divizia A under head coach Dincă Schileru and reached the Romanian Cup final (1–6 against Petrolul Ploieşti).

At the end of the 1963–64 season, Siderurgistul finished 14th and was relegated back to the Divizia B.

In the 1964–65 season, under head coach, Petre Moldoveanu, the club promoted again to the Divizia A, using the following players: Florea (Câmpeanu) – R. Tomescu, Costache, Ivănescu (Hulea), Voicu, Constantin (Comșa), Matei (Filimon), Pătrașcu, Voinea, Adam, Stoicescu (David), and the following season Siderurgistul relegated again.

In the 1966–67 season, Siderurgistul failed to promote finishing 2nd, and gave away its place in the Divizia B to local side Politehnica Galați and dissolves.

== Chronology of names ==
Club name	Period
Dinamo Galați	1955–1961
Clubul Sportiv Orăşenesc Galați (CSO Galați)	1961–1962
Siderurgistul Galați	1962–1967

== Honours ==
Divizia A / Liga I

- Best finish 14th (2): 1963–64, 1965–66

Divizia B / Liga II

- Winners (2): 1962–63, 1964–65
- Runners-up (3): 1959–60, 1960–61, 1966–67

Cupa României:

- Runners-up (1): 1962–63

== Former managers ==
- (Romania) Costică Marinescu (1958–1961)
- (Romania) Dincă Schileru (1961–1963)
- (Romania) Traian Tomescu (1963–1964)
- (Romania) Petre Moldoveanu (1964–1965)
- (Romania) Ion Zaharia (1965–1966)
