= 1962–63 Cupa României =

Tournament details
- Country: Romania

Final positions
- Champions: Petrolul Ploiești
- Runners-up: Siderurgistul Galați

The 1962–63 Cupa României was the 25th edition of Romania's most prestigious football cup competition.

The title was won by Petrolul Ploiești against Siderurgistul Galați.

== Format ==
The competition is an annual knockout tournament.

In the first round proper, two pots were made, first pot with Divizia A teams and other teams till 16 and the second pot with the rest of teams qualified in this phase. Each tie is played as a single leg.

First round proper matches are played on the ground of the lowest ranked team, then from the second round proper the matches are played on a neutral location.

In the first round proper, if a match is drawn after 90 minutes, the game goes in extra time, and if the scored is still tight after 120 minutes, the team who played away will qualify.

From the second round proper, if a match is drawn after 90 minutes, the game goes in extra time, and if the scored is still tight after 120 minutes, then a replay will be played. In case the game is still tight after the replay, then the team from lower division will qualify for the next round.

From the first edition, the teams from Divizia A entered in competition in sixteen finals, rule which remained till today.

== First round proper ==
| Team 1 | Score | Team 2 |
|---|---|---|
10 April 1963
| Minerul Baia Mare (Div. B) | 2–0 | (Div. A) Crişana Oradea |
| Metalul București (Div. B) | 0–2 (a.e.t.) | (Div. A) Petrolul Ploiești |
| IS Câmpia Turzii (Div. B) | 1–0 | (Div. B) Arieșul Turda |
| Ştiinţa Craiova (Div. B) | 3–1 | (Div. A) UTA Arad |
| AS Cugir (Div. B) | 4–2 | (Div. A) Minerul Lupeni |
| Ştiinţa Galaţi (Div. B) | 0–3 | (Div. A) Dinamo Bacău |
| IMU Medgidia (Div. B) | 0–3 | (Div. A) Rapid București |
| Gaz Metan Mediaş (Div. B) | 2–1 | (Div. A) Steagul Roşu Braşov |
| Ceahlăul Piatra Neamț (Div. B) | 0–3 | (Div. A) CSMS Iaşi |
| Dinamo Pitești (Div. B) | 1–1 (a.e.t.) | (Div. A) Progresul București |
| Prahova Ploiești (Div. B) | 1–0 | (Div. A) Farul Constanța |
| CSM Reșița (Div. B) | 0–2 | (Div. A) Ştiinţa Timişoara |
| CFR Roşiori (Div. B) | 1–3 | (Div. A) Dinamo București |
| ASMD Satu Mare (Div. B) | 2–0 | (Div. A) Ştiinţa Cluj |
| Carpaţi Sinaia (Div. B) | 1–2 | (Div. A) Steaua București |
| Siderurgistul Galați (Div. B) | 3–0 (forfait) | (Div. A) Viitorul București |

== Second round proper ==
| Team 1 | Score | Team 2 |
|---|---|---|
15 May 1963
| Dinamo București | 6–5 | Dinamo Bacău |
| Progresul București | 3–2 (a.e.t.) | Gaz Metan Mediaş |
| CSMS Iaşi | 3–1 (a.e.t.) | ASMD Satu Mare |
| Minerul Baia Mare | 2–0 | Ştiinţa Craiova |
| Petrolul Ploiești | 3–1 (a.e.t.) | Prahova Ploiești |
| Ştiinţa Timişoara | 4–0 | AS Cugir |
| Siderurgistul Galați | 2–1 | IS Câmpia Turzii |
27 June 1963
| Steaua București | 7–2 | Rapid București |

== Quarter-finals ==
| Team 1 | Score | Team 2 |
|---|---|---|
27 June 1963
| Petrolul Ploiești | 2–0 | Dinamo București |
| Progresul București | 1–1 (a.e.t.) | Siderurgistul Galați |
| CSMS Iaşi | 3–1 | Ştiinţa Timişoara |
4 July 1963
| Steaua București | 4–0 | Minerul Baia Mare |
28 June 1963 — Replay
| Progresul București | 2–2 (a.e.t.) | Siderurgistul Galați ‡ |

Notes:

- ‡ Siderurgistul Galați qualified in semi-finals being the younger team (24,9 years) compared with Progresul București (26,6 years).

== Semi-finals ==
| Team 1 | Score | Team 2 |
|---|---|---|
10 July 1963
| Petrolul Ploiești | 2–0 | Steaua București |
| Siderurgistul Galați | 3–3 (a.e.t.) | CSMS Iaşi |
11 July 1963 — Replay
| Siderurgistul Galați | 5–1 | CSMS Iaşi |

== Final ==
21 July 1963
17:30 EET

| Petrolul Ploiești | 6–1 | Siderurgistul Galați |
|---|---|---|
| Munteanu 14'; Dridea 30', 69', 77'; Moldoveanu 35', 49' | Report | Zgardan 10' |

23 August, Bucharest
Attendance: 45,000
Referee: Mircea Cruţescu (Bucharest)

Cupa României 1962–63 winners

1st title
