= Căile Ferate Române Line 300 =

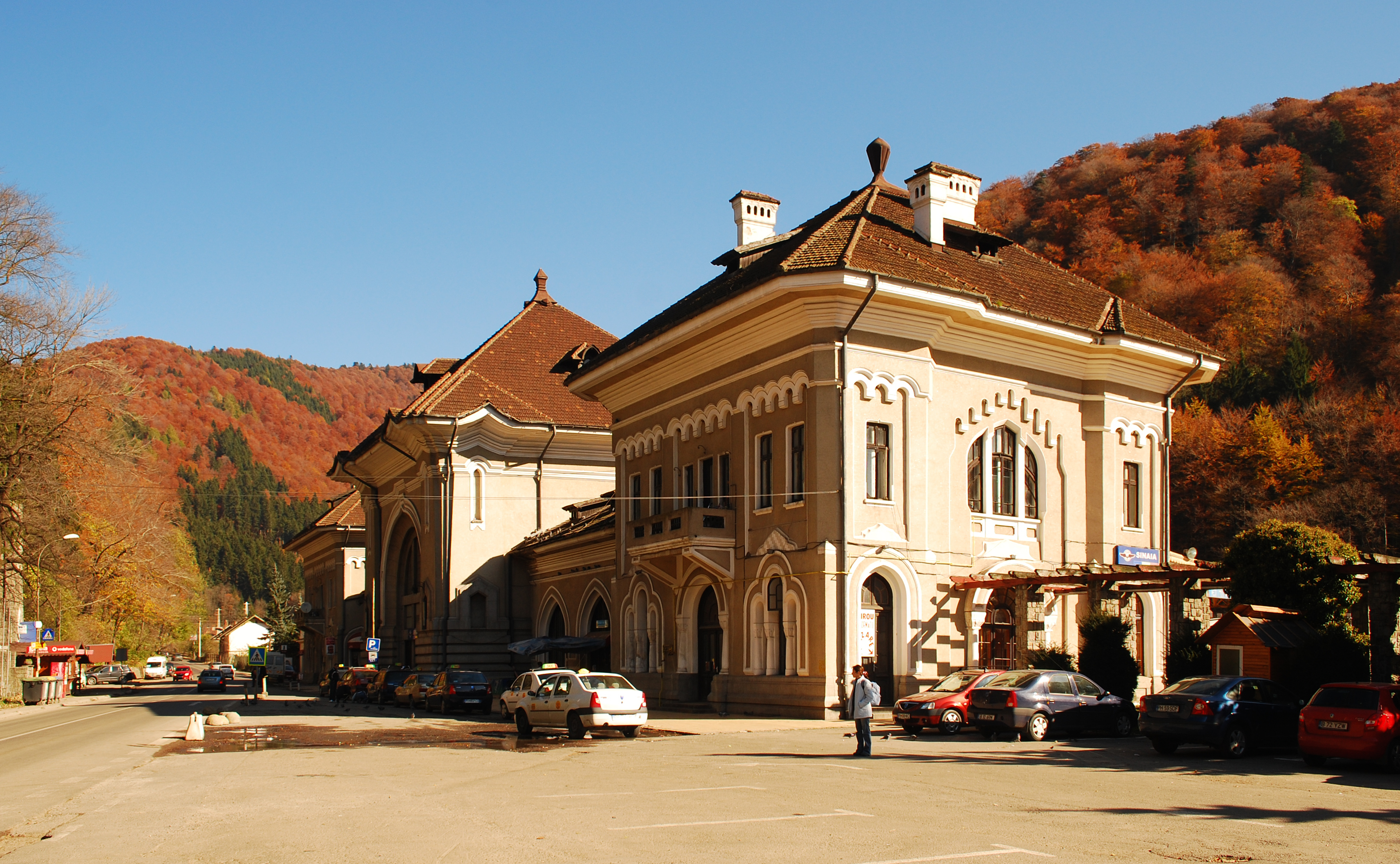
- Sinaia railway station

Overview
- Locale: Brașov, Mureș, Alba, Cluj, Bihor
- Stations: 35

Service
- Operator(s): Căile Ferate Române

Technical
- Line length: 647 km (402 mi)
- Track gauge: 1,435 mm (4 ft 8 1/2 in) standard gauge
Route map

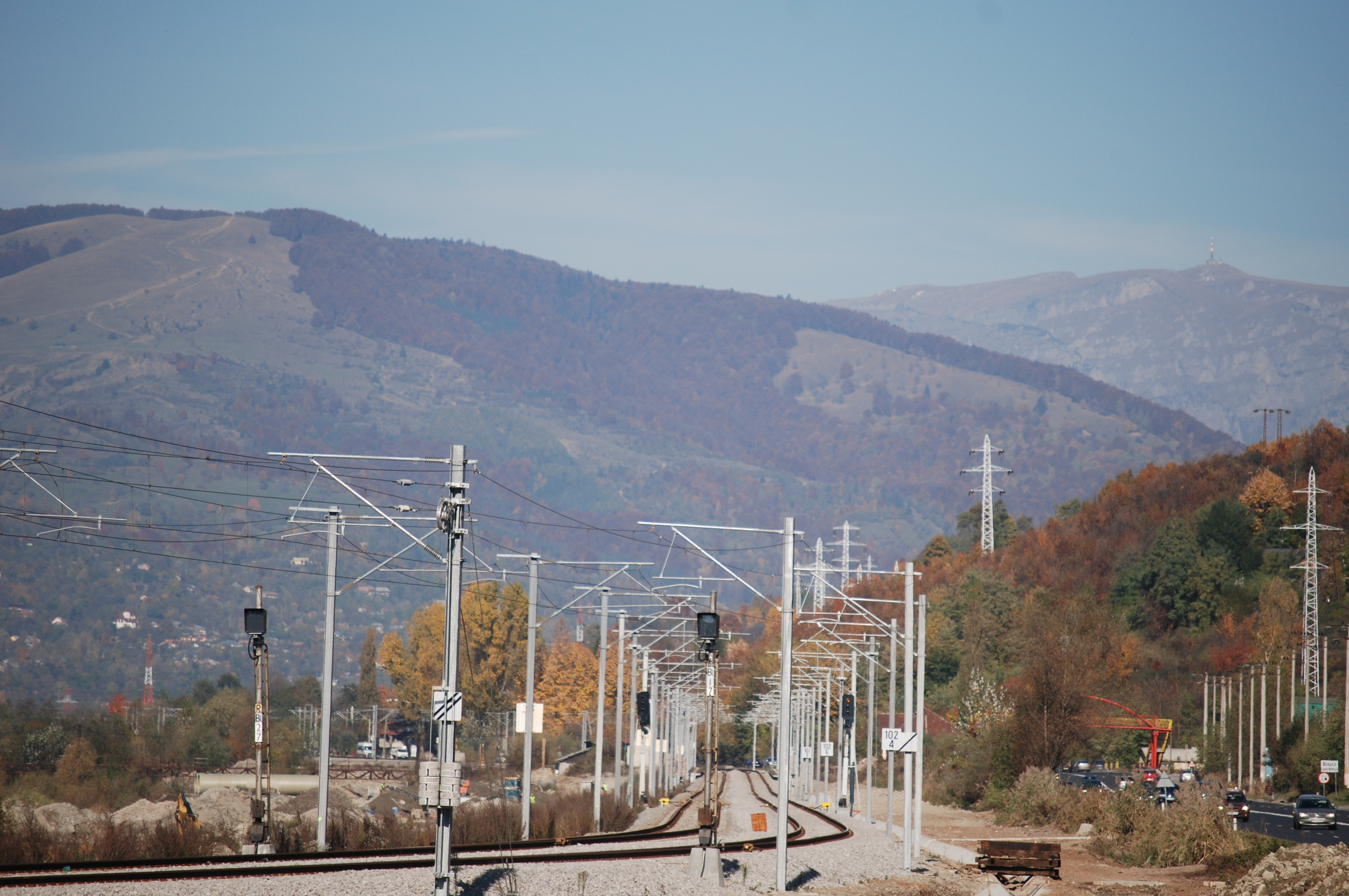
Ploiești – Brașov railway near Breaza

Line 300 is one of Căile Ferate Române's main lines in Romania, having a total length of 647 kilometres (402 mi). The main line, connecting Bucharest with the Hungarian border near Oradea, passes through Ploiești, Brașov, Sighișoara, Teiuș, and Cluj-Napoca. The section between Bucharest and Ploiești is shared with CFR line 500.

Line 300 makes up part of the TEN-T Rhine–Danube Corridor. In this context, the line is to be greatly upgraded, improving speed, capacity and interoperability (train lengths, ERTMS).

The section between Câmpina and Predeal was upgraded between 2007 and 2011, bringing several improvements to the infrastructure along the route. Between 2012 and 2018, the Coșlariu–Sighișoara section was extensively upgraded to speeds of up to 160 km/h, including the construction of bridges and tunnels to straighten out the alignment of the railway.

== Secondary lines ==
Line	Terminal stations		Intermediate stops	Length (km)
301	Câmpina	Telega		8
302	Ploiești	Târgoviște		52
304	Ploiești (South)	Măneciu		51
305	Câmpia Turzii	Turda		9
306	Ploiești (South)	Slănic	Plopeni	44
307	Blaj	Praid	Târnăveni (Vest)	113
308	Sighișoara	Odorhei		47
309	Oradea	Băile Felix		10
310	Timișoara (north)	Oradea	Arad – Sântana – Nădab – Ciumeghiu	178
311	Salonta	Kötegyán		13
312	Oradea	Cheresig		23
313	Nădab	Grăniceri		20
314	Oradea	Holod	Rogoz	53
316	Vașcău	Ciumeghiu	Holod	101
317	Arad	Brad	Ineu – Gurahonț	167
318	Ineu	Cermei		14
