= Mislea Prison =

Romanian prison

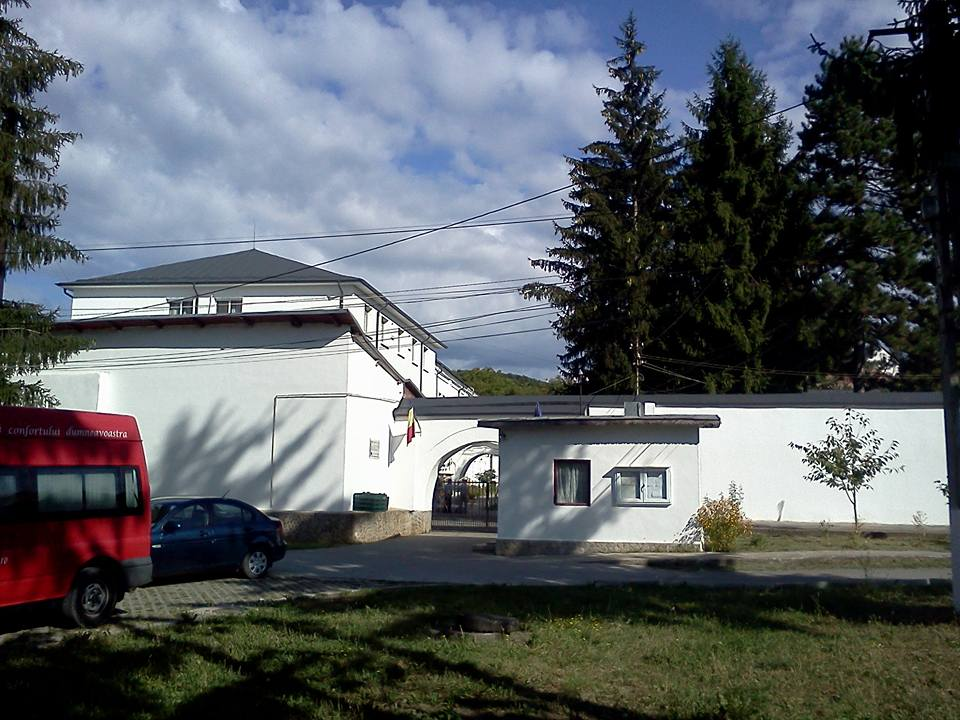
- The old Mislea Monastery, where Mislea Prison was located
- Interactive map of Mislea Prison
- Location: Mislea, Prahova County, Romania; 45°05′32.5″N 25°49′29.7″E
- Status: defunct
- Capacity: 527
- Population: Political prisoners
- Opened: 1869
- Closed: 1970s
- Director: Elena Tudor (1944–1953)

Notable prisoners
- Maria Antonescu, Constanța Crăciun, Ghizela Vass, Ana Pauker, Elisabeta Rizea, Nadia Russo

Mislea Prison was a prison located in Mislea, Prahova County, Romania.

== History ==
=== Founding ===
The prison was established in 1869 on the site of the Mislea Monastery. Founded in 1536–1537 by Radu Paisie, Prince of Wallachia, the ex-monastery is located on the banks of the Mislei River, close to where it reaches the Telega River, in between Câmpina and Ploiești. The compound has a quadrangular shape, being fortified with high walls, supported on strong buttresses; it includes the defense tower, the bell tower at the entrance, and the cells, built on vaulted cellars.

=== Early 20th century ===
The prison housed minors until 1924, when it became a women's prison. That year, three workshops were opened, for weaving, carpet-making and clothes-making. The women were common criminals as well as political prisoners placed in a special section: spies, Iron Guard affiliates and Romanian Communist Party activists. Liuba Chișinevschi, Constanța Crăciun, and Ghizela Vass fell into the latter category, as did Ana Pauker. The church at the center of the monastery was strongly affected by the 1940 Vrancea earthquake; the inmates helped with the repairs. From 1944 to 1952, the prisoners were both ordinary and political; only political from 1952 to 1956; and, in theory, only ordinary afterwards. In 1954, there were 397 political prisoners at Mislea.

=== Communist regime ===
By and large, conditions were less harsh than in the average prison during the early communist regime. After 1949, political prisoners were allowed into the workshops, producing traditional crafts, bridal dresses and Persian rugs, then using the money to buy food from a nearby farm. However, work eventually came to exceed twelve hours a day. Elisabeta Rizea and Niculina, the wife of Ion Mihalache, were among those permitted to weave carpets. "Secret" prisoners, not even allowed to take a walk, included Maria Antonescu (1950–1955), Arlette Coposu, and Maria Golescu. Elena Codreanu, the widow of Iron Guard leader Corneliu Zelea Codreanu, and Veturia Goga, the widow of poet and Prime Minister Octavian Goga were also a prisoners here. Ioana Berindei, the daughter of historian and politician Ioan Hudiță and the wife of historian Dan Berindei was detained at Mislea Prison together with her infant daughter, Ruxandra, after giving birth in 1951 at Văcărești Prison. Also a prisoner in the early 1950 was Nadia Russo, an aviator who flew air ambulance missions in World War II with the White Squadron.

== Safety conditions ==
Non-working detainees were served small portions of barely edible food. The prisoners were as young as school age, and one was brought there shortly after being born, the posthumous daughter of an anti-communist resistance movement fighter, interned along with her mother. There were seventeen large rooms with a capacity of 527 inmates, with 21 to 34 per room. One ten-minute shower was allowed weekly. Physical beatings were rare, but other punishments frequent: food deprivation, being forced to stand from 5 in the morning until 10 at night, vaginal inspections, and isolation in freezing rooms. Letters, packages and visits were forbidden. The warden from 1944 to 1953, a veteran communist, stands out as a positive character in memoirs: she hated informants, procured medicines for the prisoners, and tolerated the celebration of Christmas. At other times, the warden, Elena Tudor, was much harsher, earning the nickname Caligula. For instance, after one inmate was left alone to give birth at night, Tudor came in, saw her all covered in blood, and said: "There, whelping like a reactionary bitch". In the end, Tudor would be reported as being "close to the detainees" and, following an investigation, was fired; after working for some years at the Salubrity Services in Bucharest (or being imprisoned, according to other sources), she returned to Mislea, where she lived alone until the end of her life. From 1954 to 1956, the political officer at Mislea was Alexandru Vișinescu. The place that the prisoners sent to Mislea feared the most was Gherla (a name derived from Gherla Prison) or the "black dungeon" — a dark and cold room without bed and mattress, intended to terrorize women. If a detainee was a recidivist, did not comply with prison regulations, or did not work enough, she could be sent there for 10 days, even and sometimes more; many were punished this way, especially in the very cold winter of 1954–1955.

Many inmates were liberated after the 1964 general amnesty, and the prison was closed in the 1970s. The facilities have been renovated and now house a Care and Assistance Center for Disabled Adults.
