= Telega (disambiguation) =

Telega may refer to:

- Telega, a Russian horse-drawn carriage
- Telega, Prahova, a commune in Romania
- Telega (river), Romania
- An alternate spelling for Telaga caste
- Telega (messenger), an open-source fork of Telegram messenger

== Surname ==
- Ewa Telega (born 1962), Polish actress
- Józef Joachim Telega (1943–2005),

== See also ==
- Telega Tunggal No 1 - the first successful oil well drilled in Indonesia
