= Cosmina (river) =

- Location within Romania

Location
- Country: Romania
- Counties: Prahova County

Physical characteristics
- Mouth: Telega
  - location: Plopeni
  - coordinates: 45.0712°N 25.9833°E
- Length: 24 km (15 mi)
- Basin size: 67 km^{2} (26 sq mi)

Basin features
- Progression: Telega→ Teleajen→ Prahova→ Ialomița→ Danube→ Black Sea

The Cosmina is a left tributary of the river Telega in Romania. It discharges into the Telega in Plopeni. It flows through the villages Cosmina de Sus, Cosmina de Jos, Vâlcănești and Cârjari. Its length is 24 km (15 mi) and its basin size is 67 km^{2} (26 sq mi).
