= Mislea =

Mislea may refer to several villages in Romania:

- Mislea, a village in Cobia Commune, Dâmbovița County
- Mislea, a village in Scorțeni Commune, Prahova County
