= CSO Plopeni =

Romanian football club

- Full name: Clubul Sportiv Orășenesc Plopeni
- Nicknames: Plopenarii (The People from Plopeni); Prahovenii (The People from Prahova County); Metalurgiștii (The Metal Workers)
- Short name: CSO, Metalul
- Founded: 1947; 79 years ago as Metalul Plopeni; 1967; 59 years ago as Rapid Plopeni; 2006; 20 years ago as Intersport Plopeni
- Ground: Gheorghe Șilaev
- Capacity: 9,000 (5,000 seated)
- Owner: Plopeni Town
- Chairman: Radu Perpelea
- Manager: Daniel Dumitrache
- League: Liga III
- 2025–26: Liga III, Seria II, 9th
- Website: csoplopeni.ro
Home colours	Away colours

Clubul Sportiv Orășenesc Plopeni, commonly known as CSO Plopeni, or simply as Plopeni, is a Romanian amateur football club based in Plopeni, Prahova County. The club was originally established in 1947 under the name of Metalul Plopeni.

Metalul merged with Rapid Mizil in 1967, was enrolled directly in the third tier and was for decades a constant presence at the level of Liga II and Liga III. In 2004 the club was dissolved due to financial difficulties and re-established only in 2006, after two years of inactivity, this time under the name of Intersport Plopeni.

Despite its good financial conditions for the fourth level, Intersport failed to promote in the next three years, then in 2009 the football club was included as a section of the multi-sport entity CSO Plopeni. Intersport was renamed as CSO Plopeni and promoted back to Liga III after only one year. In the third season after promotion, CSO Plopeni withdrew due to financial problems and enrolled in the Liga IV, where is currently playing.

== History ==
=== Metalul Plopeni (1947–2004) ===
CSO Plopeni was established in 1947 under the name of Metalul Plopeni and played for 20 years only at county level, fourth tier. In the summer of 1967, third-tier side Rapid Mizil merged with Metalul Plopeni, the new formed entity was named Rapid Plopeni and continued the legacy of the football club based in Plopeni, but at the level of Divizia C.

In the summer of 1968, after a first season ended on the 4th place, Rapid Plopeni was renamed as Metalul Plopeni and won its Divizia C series at the end of the season, but failed to promote in the Divizia B, after it was ranked only 3rd in a promotion play-off group consisting of Metalul Târgoviște, Știința Bacău and IMU Medgidia. Next season, Metalul won again its series, but failed to promoted for the second consecutive year, after a new 3rd rank in the promotion play-off group, this time a group consisting of ȘN Oltenița, CFR Pașcani and Autobuzul București.

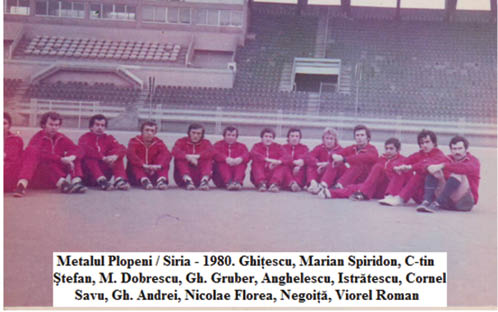
Metalul Plopeni in Syria (summer of 1980).

Metalul Plopeni finally promoted in the summer of 1971, after obtaining again the best ranking in its series with nine points ahead the second place, Șoimii Buzău. "The Metal Workers" remained a constant presence at the level of the second tier for the next decade, period in which were ranked as follows: 8th (1971–72 and 1972–73), 4th (1973–74, 1976–77 and 1979–80), 6th (1974–75), 12th (1975–76 and 1980–81) and 3rd (1977–78 and 1978–79). The two third places obtained in 1978 and 1979 will be the best performance in the history of the club from Prahova County. Metalul relegated to Divizia C at the end of 1981–82 edition, as a result of the weakest rank obtained in the second tier, 16th place.

The period between 1978 and 1981 was by far the most fruitful in the history of the team based in Plopeni, apart from the best performances, Metalul had a very stable financial situation. Plopenarii were allowed by the communists to take part in training camps abroad, thing that was very rare in that period, especially for a second-tier team. Metalul played matches in Cuba, Libya and Syria, sometimes even in front of 50,000 people. In that period for Metalul also played Marian Spiridion, nicknamed "Jair", Divizia B all-time goalscorer. In the squad were also players such as Ghițescu, Ștefan, Dobrescu, Gh. Gruber, Anghelescu, Istrătescu, Savu, Andrei, Florea, Negoiță, Roman or Mocanu and manager was the famous Virgil Dridea.

Prahovenii promoted back after spending only one season in the third tier, winning Series V under Alexandru Pall. The squad included Andrei, Albină, Viorel Roman, Moise, Gruber, Gh. Mihalache, Bobe, T. Manolache, C. Ștefan, Negoescu, D. Popa, Savu, Istrătescu, Dumitru, Vasile, Preda, Ioniță, Dumitrescu, Dinu, Niță, Argăseală, Bratosin, Duma, Mocanu, Dobre, Stăncioiu, and Baroian. This time, however, they managed a spell of just three years in the second division, finishing 13th in 1983–84 under the guidance of Constantin Moldoveanu, 5th in 1984–85, and 15th in 1985–86 under Mihai Mocanu.

Subsequently, Metalul proved to be a team too strong for the third tier but not sufficiently prepared for the second, earning promotion again in the summer of 1987 under the guidance of Tudor Mihalache, with the following players in the squad: State, Bojoacă, Cioboată, D. Popa, Andrei, Gabel, Voicilă, Preda, Cepoiu, Safta, Toma, Savu, Argăseală, Luncă, M. Mihalache, Niță, P. Preda, Moldoveanu, Pană, and Crîngașu, before suffering relegation once more after finishing 12th in 1987–88 and 15th in 1988–89.

After this relegation, the team based in Plopeni remained in the third tier during the following period, finishing 2nd in Series IV of the 1989–90 season, with Gheorghe Gruber in charge in the first part and Valeriu Giba in the second, and once again securing 2nd place in the 1990–91 season, this time in Series VI. Under the guidance of Mircea Dridea, the team finished 1st in Series IV in the 1991–92 season, but due to a reorganization of the competitive system, promotion was denied. Success finally came at the end of the 1992–93 season, when the team won Series II and earned promotion. Metalul spent next five seasons in the Divizia B, but again with no notable results, finally relegating at the end of the 1997–98 season.

During the 1998–99 edition, Metalul almost relegated in the 4th tier after it was ranked only 16th, worst ranking since 1967, but had an almost incredible comeback next season, when it promoted once again in the Divizia B. After another four seasons in the second division, in which Metalul had honorable rankings (6th – 2000–01, 5th – 2001–02, 9th – 2001–02 and 6th – 2003–04), the club opted to withdraw from the second tier and sold its place to Dinamo II București, subsequently being dissolved. In this last period spent in the Divizia B, Metalul was also, for a short period, the second squad of Astra Ploiești.

=== Lower leagues (2006–present) ===
Name	Period
1947–1967	Metalul Plopeni
1967–1968	Rapid Plopeni
1968–2004	Metalul Plopeni
2004–2006	*not active
2006–2010	Intersport Plopeni
2010–present	CSO Plopeni

After two years of inactivity, Metalul Plopeni was re-founded, this time under the name of Intersport Plopeni. Intersport was far from Metalul's performances and never played higher than the 4th tier, despite the good conditions it had, compared to the rivals from the league.

In the summer of 2009, Intersport Plopeni was included in the newly formed multi-sport club CSO Plopeni. In this way, Intersport started to be the football section of CSO Plopeni, also changing its name during the summer of 2010, from Intersport Plopeni to CSO Plopeni. After only one season, with a proper funding from the Town of Plopeni, CSO promoted in the Liga III, performance that was considered an important comeback for the small town, after 6 years of absence from the national leagues. But the financial status of the former "metal workers" was not so good as it was in the past, plopenarii finishing 12th (2010–11) and 10th (2011–12), before withdrawing in the first part of the 2012–13 season.

In 2013 CSO Plopeni, which was not dissolved this time, enrolled in the Liga IV, but never promoted again until now, obtaining the following rankings: 6th (2013–14), 4th (2014–15), 7th (2015–16), 5th (2016–17 and 2018–19) and 9th (2017–18). At the end of the first part of the 2019–20 season, CSO Plopeni is the leader of the series, with important chances of promotion, but the battle seems to be tough, teams such as Tricolorul Breaza and Petrolistul Boldești being right behind.

== Ground ==
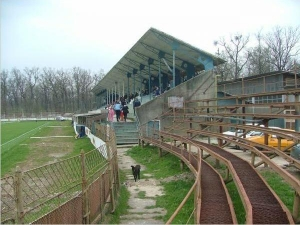
Georghe Șilaev Stadium, home ground of CSO Plopeni.

CSO Plopeni plays its home matches on Gheorghe Șilaev Stadium in Plopeni, with a capacity of 9,000 people. The stadium's is a multi-purpose one and has main stand that was built on a concrete structure, with a vintage roof, sustained by pillars and 5,000 seats. The rest of the stadium was built on metal frame and it is quite degraded.

The stadium was opened in the 1940s and was renovated and expanded for several times, especially during the communist period (before 1990). The arena is named after former director of the Plopeni Factory between 1952 and 1978, Gheorghe Șilaev.

== Honours ==
Liga III

- Winners (7): 1968–69, 1969–70, 1970–71, 1982–83, 1986–87, 1991–92, 1992–93
- Runners-up (3): 1989–90, 1990–91, 2022–23

Liga IV – Prahova County

- Winners (2): 2009–10, 2019–20

Ploiești Regional Championship

- Winners (5): 1954, 1957–58, 1959–60, 1961–62, 1963–64

Cupa României – Prahova County

- Runners-up (1): 2015–16, 2018–19

=== Other performances ===
- Appearances in Liga II: 25
- Best finish in Liga II: 3rd (1977–78, 1978–79)
- Best finish in Cupa României: Round of 16 (1965–66)

== Players ==
=== First-team squad ===
As of 10 September 2024

Note: Flags indicate national team as defined under FIFA eligibility rules; some limited exceptions apply. Players may hold more than one non-FIFA nationality.

No.	Pos.	Nation	Player
1	GK	ROU	Mihai Stan
2	DF	ROU	Ștefan Niță (on loan from Petrolul)
3	MF	ROU	Georgian Vlad
4	DF	ROU	Roberto Alecsandru
5	DF	ROU	Bogdan Minea
6	MF	ROU	Mădălin Răileanu
7	MF	ROU	Andrei Păun
8	MF	ROU	Eugen Rudaru
9	FW	ROU	Augustin Giamănu
10	MF	ROU	Nini Popescu
11	MF	ROU	Cătălin Vlad (Captain)

No.	Pos.	Nation	Player
12	GK	ROU	Mădălin Ioșca
13	MF	ROU	Andrei Rusu (Vice-Captain)
14	DF	ROU	Antonio Salameh
15	MF	ROU	Rareș Simionescu
16	DF	ROU	Andrei Giamănu
17	MF	ROU	Claudiu Bărbulescu
18	MF	ROU	Nicolae Zamfir
19	MF	ROU	Marian Moraru
20	DF	ROU	Alexandru Giuroiu
21	FW	ROU	Marius Voicu
77	MF	ROU	Eduard Bidulescu

=== Out on loan ===
Note: Flags indicate national team as defined under FIFA eligibility rules; some limited exceptions apply. Players may hold more than one non-FIFA nationality.

No. / Pos. / Nation / Player	No. / Pos. / Nation / Player

== Club Officials ==
=== Board of directors ===
Role	Name
Owners	(Romania) Plopeni Town
Honorary president	(Romania) Dragoș Niță
General director	(Romania) Ștefan Huza
Executive president	(Romania) Radu Perpelea
Sporting director	(Romania) Ion Cernica
Organizer of Competitions	(Romania) Cristian Boca

=== Current technical staff ===
Role	Name
Manager	(Romania) Daniel Dumitrache
Goalkeeping coach	(Romania) Aurel Panaite
Masseur	(Romania) Marius Voicilă

== Notable former players ==
The footballers enlisted below have had international cap(s) for their respective countries at junior and/or senior level and/or more than 50 caps for CSO Plopeni. Players selected that had no international cap(s) or didn't play more than 50 matches for CSO Plopeni could be considered notable, if they played in the top-flight, considering that CSO Plopeni never achieved that level.

- (Romania) Gheorghe Andrei
- (Romania) Iulian Apostol
- (Romania) Tiberiu Argăseală
- (Romania) Petre Babone
- (Romania) Sergiu Bar
- (Romania) Daniel Bălașa
- (Romania) Csaba Borbély
- (Romania) Romulus Ciobanu
- (Romania) Ștefan Ciobanu
- (Romania) Stelian Cismaru
- (Romania) Virgil Dridea
- (Romania) Marin Dună
- (Romania) Nicolae Florea
- (Romania) Gheorghe Gruber
- (Romania) Nicolae Ionescu
- (Romania) Gheorghe Matei
- (Romania) Marcel Marin
- (Romania) Florin Matache
- (Romania) Cornel Mihart
- (Romania) Bujorel Mocanu
- (Romania) Mihai Negoiță
- (Romania) Dumitru Pisău
- (Romania) Ilie Poenaru
- (Romania) Ion Radu
- (Romania) Valeriu Răchită
- (Romania) Viorel Roman
- (Romania) Valentin Sandu
- (Romania) Cornel Savu
- (Romania) Vasile Sfetcu
- (Romania) Marian Spiridon

== Notable former managers ==
- (Romania) Gheorghe Bărbulescu (1967–1971)
- (Romania) Virgil Dridea (1977–1983)
- (Romania) Constantin Moldoveanu (1983–1984)
- (Romania) Mihai Mocanu (1984–1986)
- (Romania) Tudor Mihalache (1986–1989)
- (Romania) Gheorghe Gruber (1989)
- (Romania) Valeriu Giba (1990–1991)
- (Romania) Mircea Dridea (1991–1993)
- (Romania) Virgil Dridea (1995–1996)
- (Romania) Bujorel Mocanu (1996–2000)
- (Romania) Constantin Stancu (2001)
- (Romania) Virgil Dridea (2003–2004)
- (Romania) Marius Voicilă (2008–2009)
- (Romania) Daniel Dumitrache (2009)
- (Romania) Romulus Ciobanu (2009–2010)
- (Romania) Eduard Iuhas
- (Romania) Adalbert Marosi
- (Romania) Emil Avasilichioaie

== League and Cup history ==
Season	Tier	Division	Place	Notes	Cupa României
2025–26	3	Liga III (Seria II)	8th / 5th	Play-out	Second round
2024–25	3	Liga III (Seria VI)	4th	Play-off	
2023–24	3	Liga III (Seria IV)	7th		
2022–23	3	Liga III (Seria V)	2nd		
2021–22	3	Liga III (Seria V)	7th		
2020–21	3	Liga III (Seria V)	7th		
2019–20	4	Liga IV (PH)	1st (C, P)	Promoted	
2018–19	4	Liga IV (PH)	5th		
2017–18	4	Liga IV (PH)	9th		
2016–17	4	Liga IV (PH)	5th		
2015–16	4	Liga IV (PH)	7th		
2014–15	4	Liga IV (PH)	4th		
2013–14	4	Liga IV (PH)	6th		
2012–13	4	Liga IV (PH)	6th		
2011–12	3	Liga III (Seria III)	10th (R)	Relegated	
2010–11	3	Liga III (Seria III)	12th		
2009–10	4	Liga IV (PH)	1st (C, P)	Promoted	

Season	Tier	Division	Place	Notes	Cupa României
2008–09	4	Liga IV (PH)	3rd		
2007–08	4	Liga IV (PH)	5th		
2003–04	2	Divizia B (Seria I)	6th	Dissolved after the season (Note: Sold its place in Divizia B to Dinamo București II.)	
2002–03	2	Divizia B (Seria I)	9th		
2001–02	2	Divizia B (Seria I)	5th		
2000–01	2	Divizia B (Seria I)	6th		
1999–00	3	Divizia C (Seria II)	8th	Promoted (Note: Bought the place of Hondor Agigea in Divizia B.)	
1998–99	3	Divizia C (Seria II)	16th		
1997–98	2	Divizia B (Seria I)	16th (R)	Relegated	
1996–97	2	Divizia B (Seria I)	16th		
1995–96	2	Divizia B (Seria I)	13th		
1994–95	2	Divizia B (Seria I)	12th		
1993–94	2	Divizia B (Seria I)	6th		
1992–93	3	Divizia C (Seria II)	1st (C, P)	Promoted	
1991–92	3	Divizia C (Seria IV)	1st (C)		
1990–91	3	Divizia C (Seria VI)	2nd		
1989–90	3	Divizia C (Seria IV)	2nd		
1988–89	2	Divizia B (Seria I)	15th (R)	Relegated	
