= Boiu =

Boiu may refer to several villages in Romania:

- Boiu, a village in Ciumeghiu Commune, Bihor County
- Boiu, a village in Rapoltu Mare Commune, Hunedoara County
- Boiu, a village in Albești Commune, Mureș County
