= Scorțeni, Prahova =

Scorțeni
- Commune
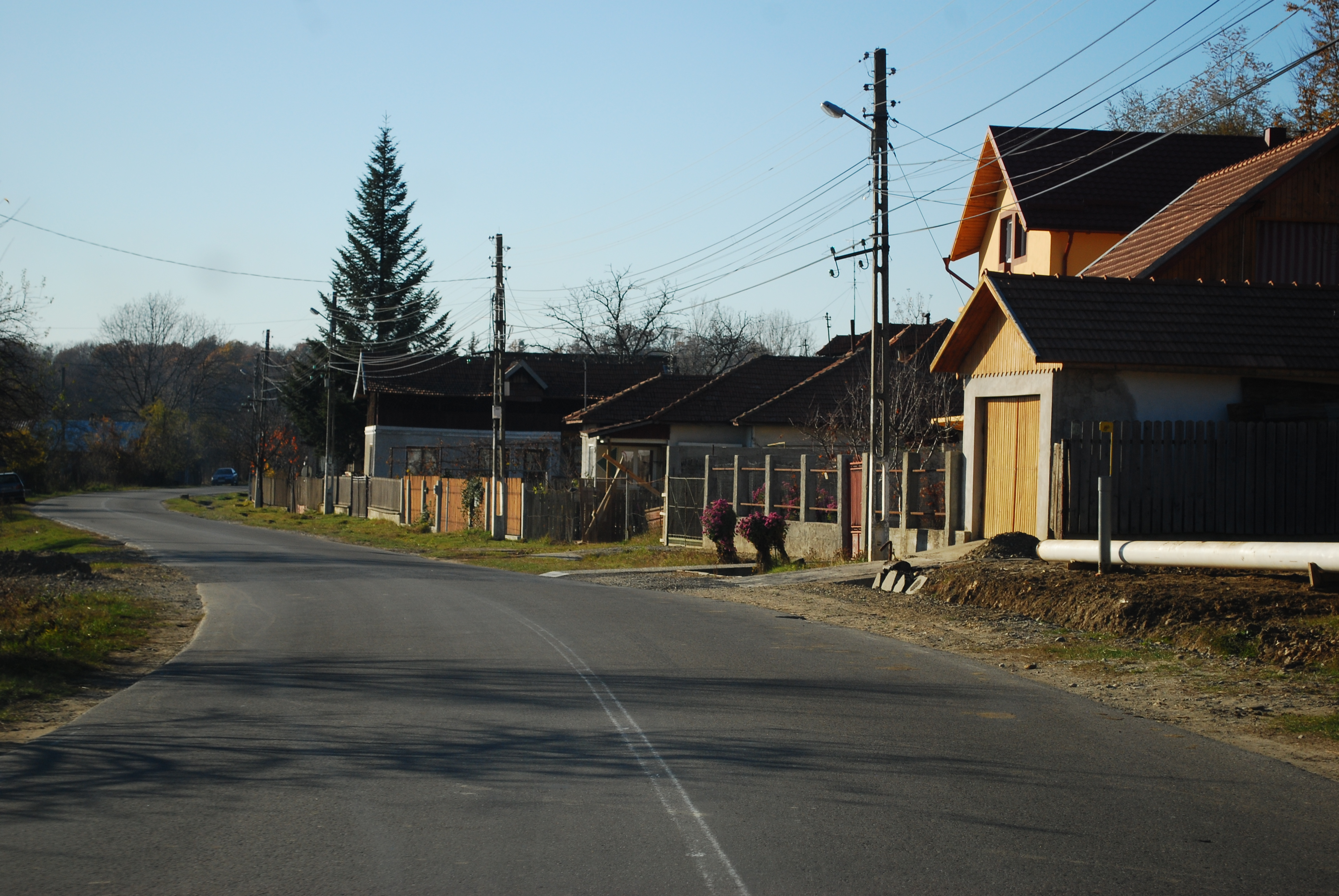
- Road in Scorțeni

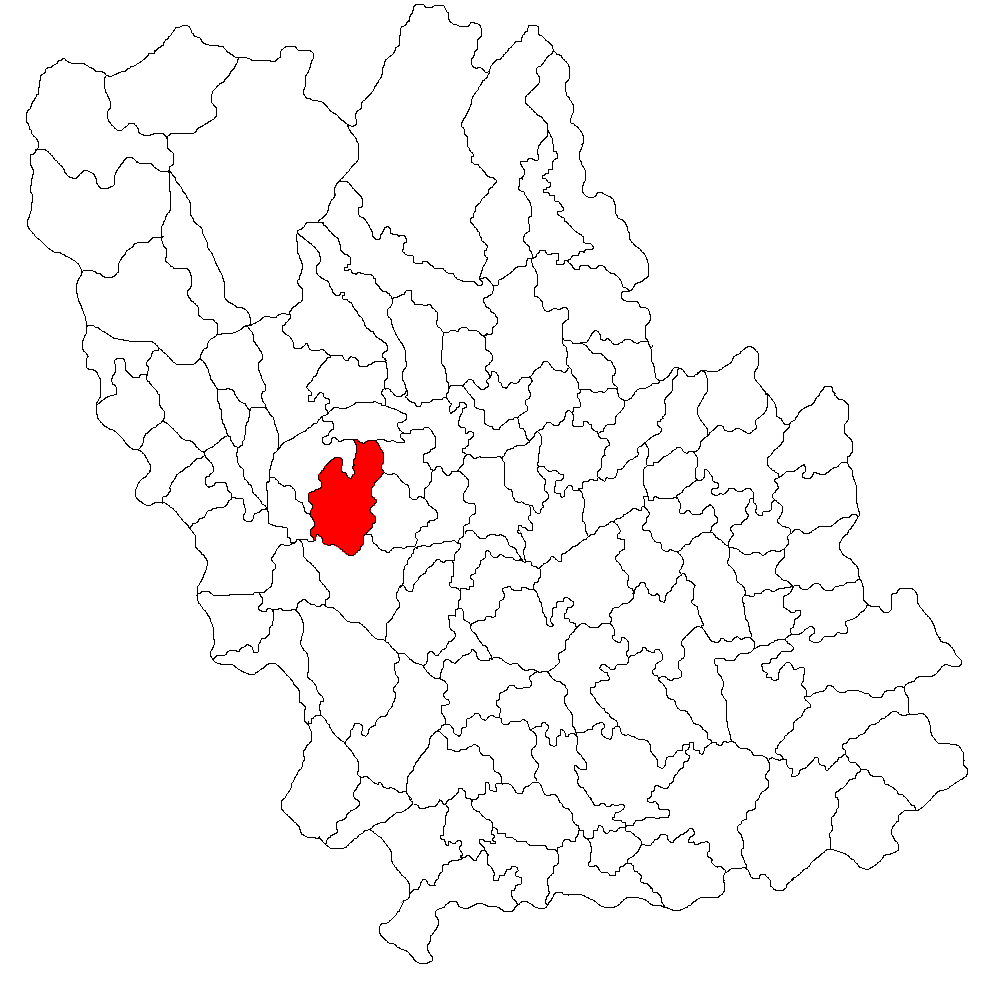
- Location in Prahova County

- Location in Romania
- Coordinates: 45°05′35″N 25°50′55″E
- Country: Romania
- County: Prahova
- Subdivisions: Bordenii Mari, Bordenii Mici, Mislea, Scorțeni, Sârca

Government
  - Mayor (2020–2024): Iulian-Constantin Barbu (PNL)
- Elevation: 350 m (1,150 ft)
- Population (2021-12-01): 5,087
- Time zone: UTC+02:00 (EET)
  - Summer (DST): UTC+03:00 (EEST)
- Postal code: 10752
- Area code: +(40) 244
- Vehicle reg.: PH
- Website: primariascorteniph.ro

Scorțeni is a commune in Prahova County, Muntenia, Romania.

== Geography ==
The commune is located in the west-central part of the county. Scorțeni is surrounded by the Sub-Carpathian hills, close to the 45th parallel north, at an altitude of approximately 350 m (1,150 ft). The most important towns in the vicinity are: Câmpina (14 km), Băicoi (6 km), Plopeni (10 km), Ploiești (25 km – the county seat), and Sinaia (40 km). The Capital city, Bucharest, is about 85 km (53 mi) to the south, while Brașov is 100 km (62 mi) to the north.

Historical population
Year	Pop.	±%
1992	6,507	—
2002	6,095	−6.3%
2011	5,634	−7.6%
2021	5,087	−9.7%
Source: Census data

== Villages ==
The commune is composed of five villages: Bordenii Mari, Bordenii Mici, Mislea, Scorțeni, and Sârca.

=== Mislea ===
Around 1540, Radu Paisie, the ruler of Muntenia province of those times, set up a monastery at the confluence between the rivers Mislei and Telega. On the monastery's ruins, a political prison was built by the former communist regime. The building was recently transformed into a state home.

Northward, on forested hills, lies Buștenari. This is an old settlement whose inhabitants have dealt with timber cut and transportation, ever since the 15th century.

To the West, Telega commune stretches its dwellings upstream the Telega River, up to the salt mines exploited for almost 700 years. Downstream Mislea River to the Est, there are the communes Scorțeni and the villages Sârca and Bordeni where the ruler Michael the Brave is said to have appropriated four of his captains, at the end of the 16th century.

During the first part of the Communist period, Mislea was the site of a penitentiary for female political prisoners. This became an old age home in the 1970s.
