= Drăghicești =

Drăghiceşti may refer to:

- Drăghiceşti, a village in Săpata Commune, Argeș County, Romania
- Drăghiceşti, a village in Cosminele Commune, Prahova County, Romania
