= Gheorghe Șilaev Stadium =

Romanian multi-purpose stadium

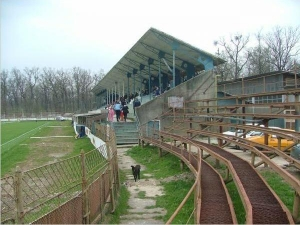
- Interactive map of Gheorghe Șilaev Stadium
- Address: Strada Democrației
- Location: Plopeni, Romania
- Coordinates: 45°02′51″N 25°56′52″E
- Owner: Town of Plopeni
- Operator: CSO Plopeni
- Capacity: 9,000 (5,000 seated)
- Surface: Grass

Construction
- Opened: 1940s
- Renovated: 1960s, 1980s

Tenants
- Metalul Plopeni (1947–2006); CSO Plopeni (2006–present)

The Gheorghe Șilaev Stadium is a multi-purpose stadium in Plopeni, Romania. It is currently used mostly for football matches and is the home ground of CSO Plopeni. The stadium is named after former director of the Plopeni Factory, Gheorghe Șilaev and holds about 9,000 people, 5,000 on seats.

The stadium was opened in the 1940s and was renovated and expanded for several times, especially during the communist period (before 1990). Gheorghe Șilaev Stadium has a main stand that was built on a concrete structure, with a vintage roof, sustained by pillars, the rest of the stadium was built on metal frame and it is quite degraded.
