= Trestioara =

Trestioara may refer to several villages in Romania:

- Trestioara, a village in Chiliile Commune, Buzău County
- Trestioara, a village in Mânzălești Commune, Buzău County
- Trestioara, a village in Dragoteşti Commune, Gorj County
- Trestioara, a village in Vâlcăneşti Commune, Prahova County
