= Sergiu Bar =

Romanian footballer

Personal information
- Full name: Sergiu Cosmin Bar
- Date of birth: 19 March 1980 (age 46)
- Place of birth: Timișoara, Romania
- Height: 1.80 m (5 ft 11 in)
- Position: Defender

Team information
- Current team: Afumați (assistant)

Youth career
- 1990–1994: Politehnica Timișoara
- 1994–1998: Srbianka Giuchici Timișoara

Senior career*
Years	Team	Apps	(Gls)
1998–2002	UM Timișoara	42	(0)
2000–2001	→ Metalul Plopeni (loan)	25	(1)
2002–2004	Metalul Plopeni	40	(0)
2004–2006	Petrolul Ploiești	43	(1)
2005–2006	→ Astra Ploiești (loan)	9	(0)
2007	Chimia Brazi	12	(0)
2007–2008	Inter Gaz București	28	(0)
2008–2011	Victoria Brănești	65	(1)
2011–2012	Voința Sibiu	15	(0)
2012–2013	Săgeata Năvodari	23	(2)
2013–2015	Afumați		

Managerial career
- 2023–: Afumați (assistant)
- * Club domestic league appearances and goals

Sergiu Cosmin Bar (born 19 March 1980) is a Romanian former footballer who played as a defender, currently assistant coach at Liga II club Afumați.

== Honours ==
UM Timișoara

- Divizia C: 1998–99

Victoria Brănești

- Liga II: 2009–10
- Liga III: 2008–09

Afumați

- Liga III: 2015–16
