= Ghizela Vass =

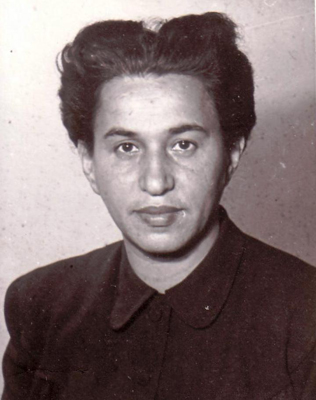
Ghizela Vass

Ghizela Vass (also Gisela or Gisella Vass; April 22, 1912 – 2004), a Romanian communist, was an activist and politician of the Romanian Communist Party (PCR). In its 2007 report, the Presidential Commission for the Study of the Communist Dictatorship in Romania identified her as one of the two main agents of the Communist regime involved in policies pertaining to external affairs.

Born in Iași, Vass went through seven years of elementary school, later attending the Ștefan Gheorghiu Academy. A seamstress by trade, she joined the textile workers’ union in 1930 and was part of International Red Aid Chișinău from 1931 to 1933. She joined the Romanian Communist Party, then illegal, in 1933. Arrested, she was imprisoned at Mislea and Dumbrăveni prisons. A Jew, she was deported to the Transnistria Governorate during World War II, where she was held at the Vapniarka concentration camp together with Petre Lupu, Simion Bughici, Lazar Grunberg, Andrei Bernat, Barbu Zaharescu, Ștefan Voicu, and Emanuel Vinea. After the coup of August 23, 1944, she held a number of positions in the PCR (which soon after became the Romanian Workers' Party, PMR), starting as a member of the Bucharest county party committee bureau. In 1948 she joined the Ilfov County party committee.

Vass served as adjunct to the chief of the Organizational Section of the Central Committee of the PMR; president of the county committee of party member verification from Reșița, secretary of the Bucharest city party committee (from January 1953); chief of the Women's Party Work Section of the Central Committee of the PMR (1955 – 24 January 1956); inspector for the Central Committee of the PMR and coordinator of the Foreign Cadres and Foreign Relations Sections of the Central Committee of the PMR (until January 1957); chief of the Foreign Relations Section of the Central Committee of the PMR (January 1957 – November 1965); chief of the International Section of the Central Committee of the PMR (from November 1965); and adjunct to the chief of the International Relations and International Economic Cooperation Section of the Central Committee of the PCR (1975 – February 1982). She retired in February 1982.

Vass was an alternate member of the Central Committee of the PMR (23 February 1948 – 27 May 1952) and a member of the Central Committee of the Romanian PMR (later PCR) (27 May 1952 – 22 November 1984). She served in the Great National Assembly from 1952 to 1957, elected for the Focșani district, Regiunea Bârlad. She was awarded membership in the following orders: Order of the Star of the Romanian People's Republic, class III (1948); class II (1964); Order of Labor, class II (1948); class I (1962); Order "Defense of the Fatherland", class II (1949); August 23 Order, class II (1959); and Tudor Vladimirescu Order, class II (1966). Additionally, she was given the title "Hero of Socialist Labour of the Romanian Socialist Republic" in 1971.

She was married to Ladislau (László) Vass (1912–1977), himself a Central Committee member. The couple, who lived for many years on Zambaccian Street, nr. 1, in the Dorobanți neighborhood of Bucharest, had the children. One daughter, Ecaterina, became a professor at the Politehnica University of Bucharest; she had a son, Bogdan Olteanu, the former president of the Chamber of Deputies of Romania. The other daughter, Zoia, studied Law and left for the United States in 1980, while the son, Gheorghe, died in his youth.
