= Telega (river) =

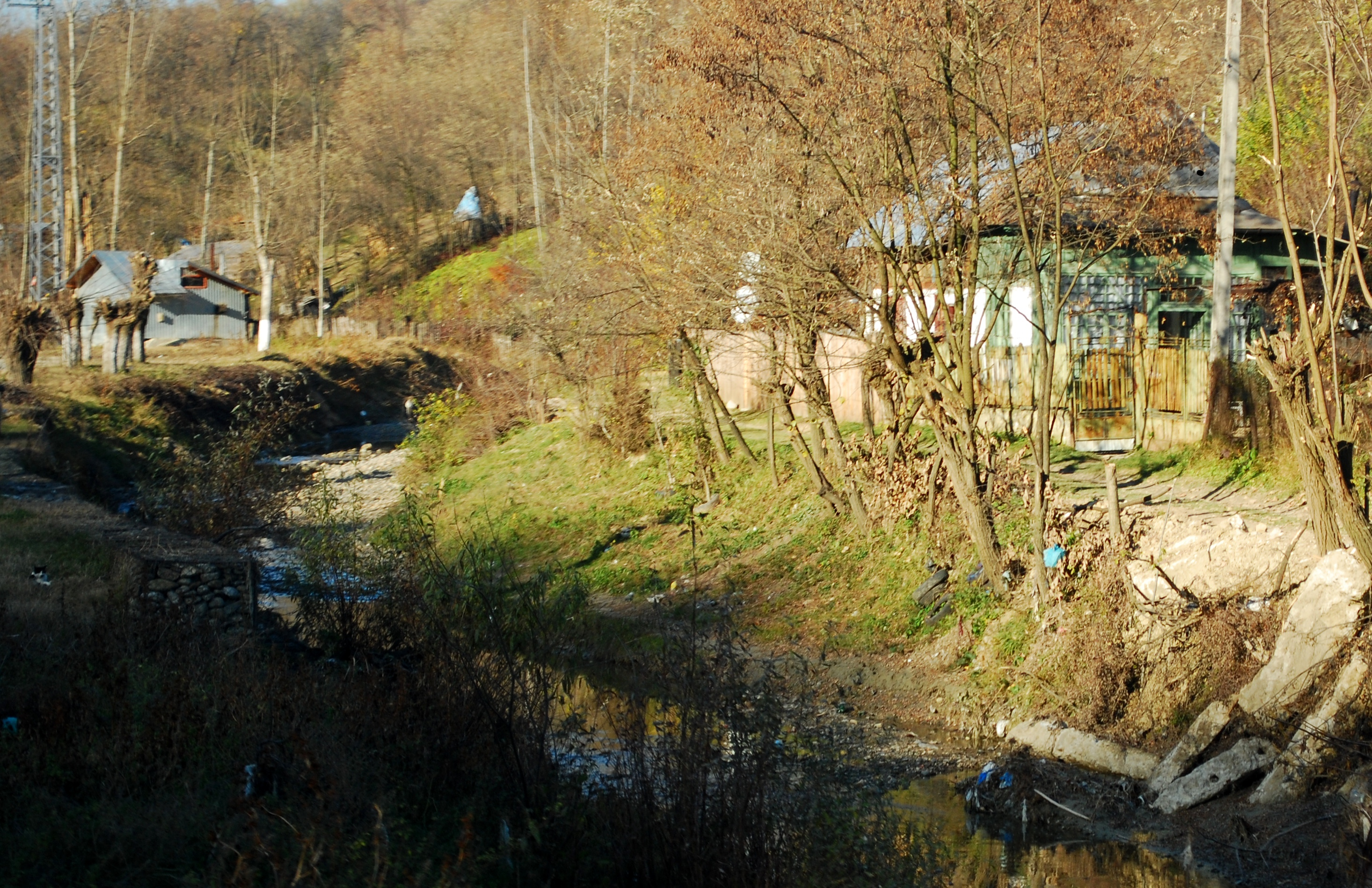
- The river Telega in Telega

- Location within Romania

Location
- Country: Romania
- Counties: Prahova County

Physical characteristics
- Mouth: Teleajen
  - location: Plopeni
  - coordinates: 45.0575°N 25.9886°E
- Length: 30 km (19 mi)
- Basin size: 182 km^{2} (70 sq mi)

Basin features
- Progression: Teleajen→ Prahova→ Ialomița→ Danube→ Black Sea
- Tributaries
  - left: Mislei, Runc, Doftăneț, Cosmina

The Telega is a right tributary of the river Teleajen in Romania. It discharges into the Teleajen in Plopeni. It flows through the villages Melicești, Telega, Mislea, Sârca, Scorțeni, Bordenii Mici, Cocorăștii Mislii, Țipărești and Plopeni. Its length is 30 km (19 mi) and its basin size is 182 km^{2} (70 sq mi).
