= Ion Stoian =

Romanian politician (born 1927)

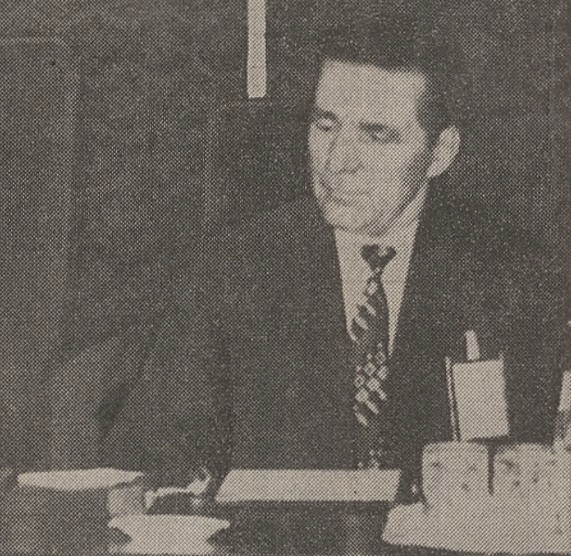
- Ion Stoian (1986)

Minister of Foreign Affairs of Romania
- In office 2 November 1989 – 22 December 1989
- President: Nicolae Ceaușescu
- Preceded by: Ioan Totu
- Succeeded by: Sergiu Celac

Personal details
- Born: 28 November 1927 Telega, Prahova County, Kingdom of Romania
- Died: 2012 (aged 84–85)

Ion Stoian (28 November 1927 – 2012) was a Romanian former communist politician who briefly served as the Minister of Foreign Affairs of Romania in 1989, during the rule of Nicolae Ceaușescu.

== Life and political career ==
Stoian was born in Telega, Prahova County on 28 November 1927. He joined the Romanian Communist Party (PCR) in 1945 and served on the PCR Bureau of the Grivița district of Bucharest. He served as the Deputy Minister of Foreign Trade and International Economic Cooperation from 7 April 1979 until 22 November 1985.

He served as the Minister of Foreign Affairs from 2 November 1989 until 22 December 1989, when the Ceaușescu regime was overthrown. As the Romanian Revolution was unfolding, Stoian accompanied Ceaușescu on his last visit to a foreign country; from 18 to 20 December, the two went to Tehran, where they met the President of Iran, Akbar Hashemi Rafsanjani.

Stoian was arrested on 19 January 1990 and sentenced to 14 years. He was pardoned by President Ion Iliescu and released in March 1994. He died in 2012.

== See also ==
- Romanian Communist Party
- Nicolae Ceaușescu
- Foreign relations of Romania
