= Valentin Sandu =

Romanian footballer

Personal information
- Date of birth: 28 February 1983 (age 43)
- Place of birth: Ploiești, Romania
- Height: 1.82 m (6 ft 0 in)
- Position: Left back

Youth career
- Matizol Ploiești

Senior career*
Years	Team	Apps	(Gls)
2003–2006	Conpet Ploiești	0	(0)
2006–2007	Dodu București	0	(0)
2007–2008	Progresul București	14	(1)
2008–2011	Astra Ploiești	28	(0)
2011–2013	Farul Constanța	26	(0)
2012–2014	CSM Câmpina	3	(0)
2014–2018	Plopeni	7	(5)
2018–2019	Petrolul 95 Ploiești	1	(1)
2019–2020	Unirea Urlați	8	(9)
Total		87	(16)
- * Club domestic league appearances and goals as of 1 May 2021

Valentin Sandu (born 28 February 1983) is a Romanian former footballer who played as a left back for teams such as Progresul București, Astra Ploiești or Farul Constanța, among others.
