= Mihai Gabel =

Romanian footballer

Personal information
- Full name: Mihai Mircea Gabel
- Date of birth: 23 July 1954
- Place of birth: Sibiu, Romania
- Date of death: 5 January 1996 (aged 41)
- Place of death: Ploiești, Romania
- Position: Central midfielder

Youth career
- 1968–1971: CSM Sibiu

Senior career*
Years	Team	Apps	(Gls)
1972–1974	Șoimii Sibiu		
1975	Petrolul Ploiești	16	(9)
1975–1981	FCM Reșița	174	(65)
1981–1984	Șoimii Sibiu	82	(20)
1985–1986	Metalul Plopeni		
1986	Metalul Băicoi		
1987	Metalul Plopeni		
1987–1991	Petrolul Băicoi		
Total		272	(94)

International career
1975	Romania U21	1	(0)
- * Club domestic league appearances and goals

Mihai Mircea Gabel (23 July 1954 – 5 January 1996) was a Romanian footballer who played as a central midfielder.
