= Nicolae Ionescu (footballer) =

Romanian footballer

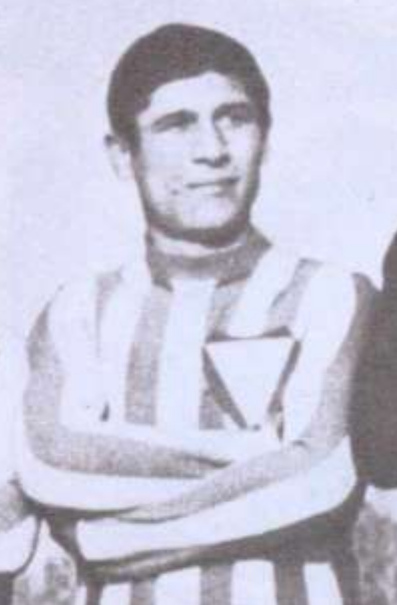
- Ionescu with Petrolul Ploiești in 1970

Personal information
- Date of birth: 12 June 1949
- Place of birth: Aninoasa, Dâmbovița, Romania
- Date of death: 25 July 1997 (aged 48)
- Height: 1.81 m (5 ft 11 in)
- Position: Central midfielder

Youth career
- 1965–1966: Metalul Târgoviște
- 1966–1967: Dinamo București

Senior career*
Years	Team	Apps	(Gls)
1967–1973	Petrolul Ploiești	153	(6)
1973–1975	Steaua București	35	(0)
1975–1976	Petrolul Ploiești	20	(1)
1976–1977	Metalul Plopeni		
Total		208	(7)

International career
1969	Romania U21	1	(0)
1968–1969	Romania U23	11	(0)
1972	Romania	4	(0)
- * Club domestic league appearances and goals

Nicolae Ionescu (12 June 1949 – 25 July 1997) was a Romanian footballer who played as a midfielder.

== Club career ==
Ionescu was born on 12 June 1949 in Aninoasa, Dâmbovița, Romania. He began playing junior-level football at Metalul Târgoviște in 1965, moving one year later to Dinamo București. He started his senior career at Petrolul Ploiești, making his Divizia A debut on 27 August 1967 under coach Ilie Oană in a 1–0 away loss to Farul Constanța. He helped the team finish in fifth place in his first season. During the same season, he played in both legs of the 5–2 aggregate loss to Dinamo Zagreb in the first round of the 1967–68 Inter-Cities Fairs Cup. In the 1970–71 season, Ionescu scored a career-best three goals. In 1973, he left Petrolul to join Steaua București at the request of Constantin Teașcă. There, he made his last Divizia A appearance on 24 November 1974 in a 1–0 away loss to CFR Cluj, totaling 188 matches with six goals in the competition. In 1975, Ionescu returned to Petrolul in the second league. He ended his career after playing for Metalul Plopeni during the 1976–77 Divizia B season.

== International career ==
From 1968 to 1969, Ionescu played one match for Romania's under-21 team and made 11 appearances for the under-23 side.

Ionescu played four games for Romania, making his debut on 8 April 1972, when coach Angelo Niculescu sent him on at half-time to replace Augustin Deleanu in a 2–0 friendly victory against France. His following two games were also friendlies, a 3–3 draw against Italy and a 1–1 draw against Austria. Ionescu's last game for the national team took place on 20 September 1972 in a 1–1 draw against Finland in the 1974 World Cup qualifiers.

== Death ==
Ionescu died on 25 July 1997 at the age of 48.
