= Nicolae Simache =

Romanian academic

- Born: November 5, 1905; Cosminele, Prahova County, Kingdom of Romania
- Died: January 6, 1972 (aged 66); Ploiești, Socialist Republic of Romania
- Education: University of Bucharest
- Occupations: Teacher, historian
- Employer: Ion Luca Caragiale National College (Ploiești)

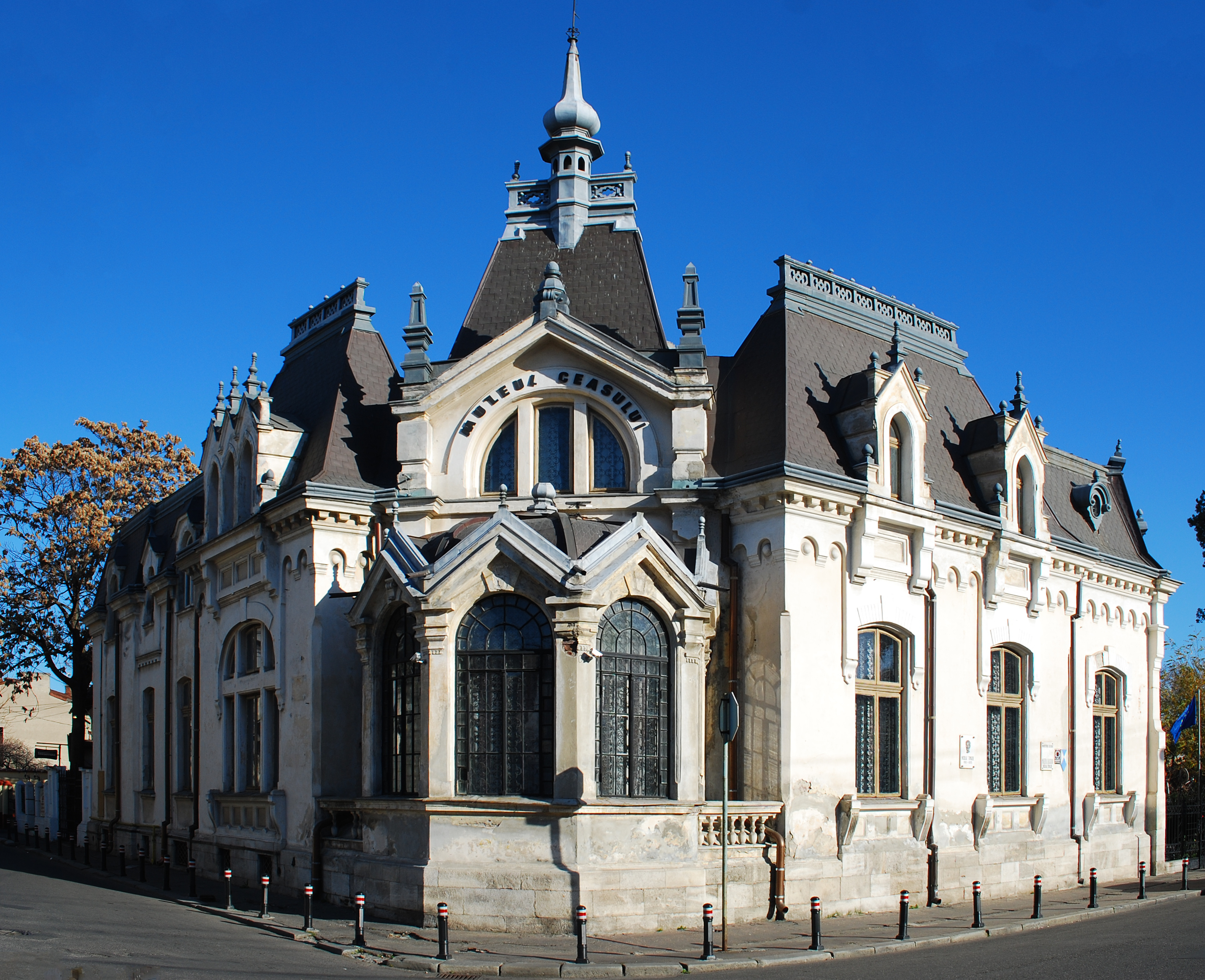
The Nicolae Simache Clock Museum in Ploiești

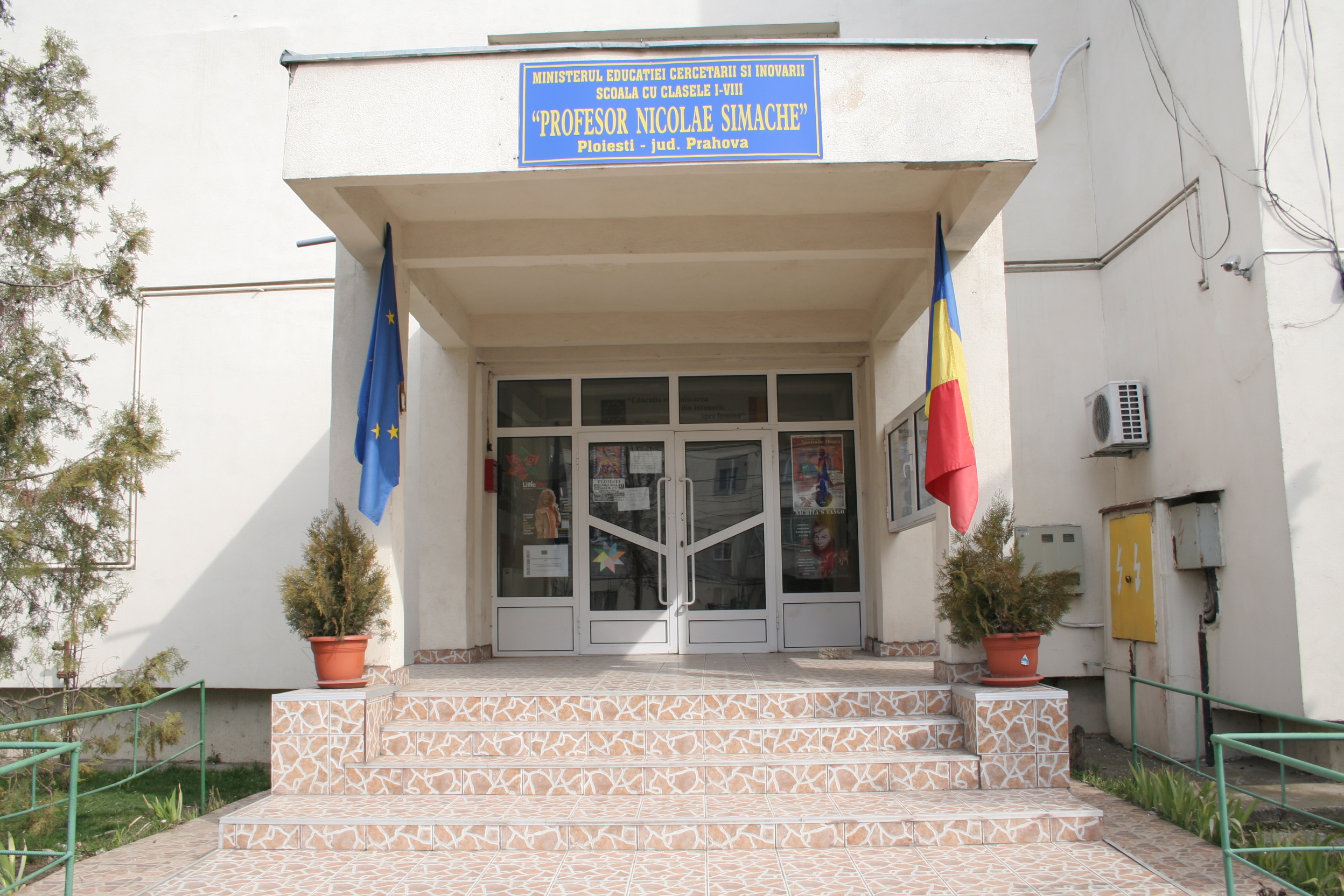
The Nicolae Simache School in Ploiești

Nicolae Simache (November 5, 1905 – January 6, 1972) was a Romanian teacher, historian, and writer.

Born in Cosminele, Prahova County, he studied at the Saints Peter and Paul High School in Ploiești, and then at the University of Bucharest, graduating in 1931. From 1932 to 1969, he taught history at his old school, which was renamed the Ion Luca Caragiale High School in 1952. In 1963, he founded a clock museum in Ploiești, now named the Nicolae Simache Clock Museum.

In 1965, he was awarded the Order of Labor, 3rd class. A school in Ploiești as well as a street in this city now bear his name.

== Publications ==
- Pinacoteca municipiului Ploiești, 1939
- Despre letopisețul Cantacuzinesc, 1942
- Istoriografia română și problemele editării cronicilor, 1942
- Știința geografică a lui Herodot despre ținuturile noastre, 1942
- Variante ale letopisețului Cantacuzinesc, 1942
- Viața și opera lui Radu Popescu, 1943
- Despre Revoluția de la 1848 în Ploiești și județul Prahova, 1948
- Contribuții la răscoala poporului român sub conducerea lui Tudor Vladimirescu, 1957
- Din trecutul regiunii Ploiești, 1957
- O străveche așezare din regiunea Ploiești: Târgșor, 1957
- Casa Hagi Prodan, 1966
- Casa Dobrescu, 1966
- Ceasul de-a lungul vremii, 1967
- Chipuri și locuri din regiunea Ploiești, în grafica secolelor XVI-XIX, 1967
- Muzeul Memorial B.P. Hașdeu - Câmpina, 1967
- Muzeul memorial Nicolae Iorga, 1967
- Caragiale și Ploieștii, 1968
- Drumuri turistice la sud-estul Carpaților, 1968;
- Muzeul tiparului și al cărții vechi românești - Târgoviște, 1968
- Casa Nicolae Iorga, 1969
- Contribuții la istoricul orașelor Ploiești și Târgoviște, 1962
- Contribuții la istoricul satelor Posești, Râncezi și Nucșoara, 1969
- Contribuții la monografia comunei Starchiojd, 1969
- Anul revoluționar 1848 în județul Prahova, 1969
- Din viața și opera lui Cezar Petrescu, 1969
- Documente privitoare la istoria comunei Starchiojd, 1969
- Un orientalist ploieștean, Gh. Popescu-Ciocănel, 1969
- Ștergarul prahovean, 1970
- Dantela de mână, 1970
- Date noi privind viața și opera lui Cincinat Pavelescu, 1970
- Noi contribuții la studiul situației țăranilor după aplicarea Regulamentului Organic în fostul județ al săcuienilor, 1970
- Istoricul tipografiilor prahovene, 1970
- Colecția de covoare a Muzeului de Istorie, 1971
- Documente de pe Valea Teleajenului, 1971
- File de istorie din trecutul comunei Teișani, 1971
