= Cighid =

Former orphanage in Ciumeghiu, Romania

Coordinates: 46°43′08″N 21°39′13″E

Cighid was a children's home in Romania where many orphans and disabled youths were held in inhumane conditions. The extent of the abuse was exposed in March 1990, shortly after the fall of Nicolae Ceaușescu's regime.

== Background ==
In 1966, the regime of Nicolae Ceaușescu decreed a ban on contraception and abortion with the aim of increasing Romania's population. At the age of three years the children were medically examined. Disabled and orphaned children were in huge numbers brought into homes like Cighid or psychiatric hospitals, where they lived under inhumane conditions. Many children, especially those with disabilities, died within weeks of their arrival due to starvation, exposure or infections caused by lack of hygiene. At the time, this was labelled "dying without being killed". The local graveyard has 137 graves of victims.

The children's home Cighid, located in Ghiorac near the Hungarian border, was discovered in spring 1990 by western reporters. The pictures of sick and malnourished children were published in many newspapers and were shown on many TV stations around the world. Observers described the sight of Cighid with terms like "Child Gulags" or "the Romanian Euthanasia Program". One example was the so-called "isolator": a shed with its windows nailed shut, where 17 toddlers were kept. In the darkness, they were using their sense of smell to know food from vomit or excrements. After the discovery, employees blamed the conditions on orders from above.

Charities from America and Western Europe contributed massively to an aid programme which saw Cighid improved. Many of the children being held at Cighid were adopted by Western European families. Others stayed in newly established homes for disabled adults, to avoid sending them to psychiatric hospitals for life.

== See also ==
- Duplessis Orphans
