= Cocorăștii Mislii =

- Commune
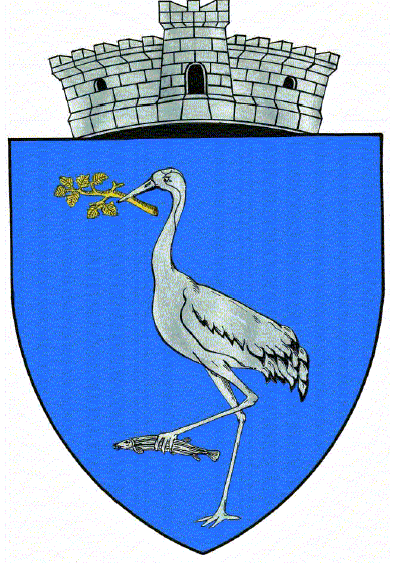
- Coat of arms

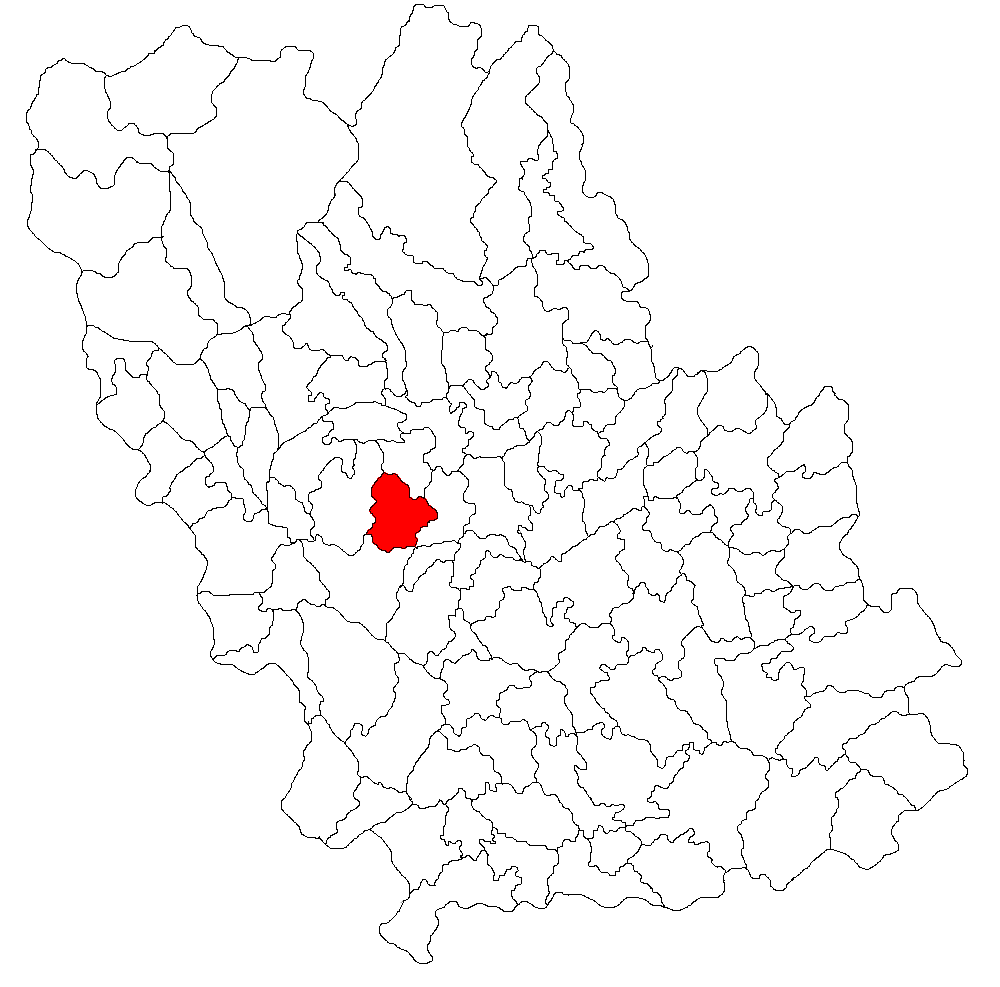
- Location in Prahova County

- Location in Romania
- Coordinates: 45°5′N 25°56′E
- Country: Romania
- County: Prahova

Government
  - Mayor (2020–2024): Daniel Alexandru (PNL)
- Area: 34.39 km^{2} (13.28 sq mi)
- Elevation: 269 m (883 ft)
- Highest elevation: 350 m (1,150 ft)
- Lowest elevation: 200 m (700 ft)
- Population (2021-12-01): 3,000
  - Density: 87/km^{2} (230/sq mi)
- Time zone: EET/EEST (UTC+2/+3)
- Postal code: 107165
- Area code: +(40) 244
- Vehicle reg.: PH
- Website: www.cocorastiimislii.ro

Cocorăștii Mislii is a commune in Prahova County, Muntenia, Romania. It is composed of three villages: Cocorăștii Mislii, Goruna, and Țipărești.

The commune is situated in the southern foothills of the Carpathian Mountains, at a mean altitude of 269 m (883 ft), on the banks of the Telega River. It is located in the central part of Prahova County, 20 km (12 mi) north of the county seat, Ploiești.

Historical population
Year	Pop.	±%
1992	3,709	—
2002	3,474	−6.3%
2011	3,229	−7.1%
2021	3,000	−7.1%
Source: Census data
