= Mislei =

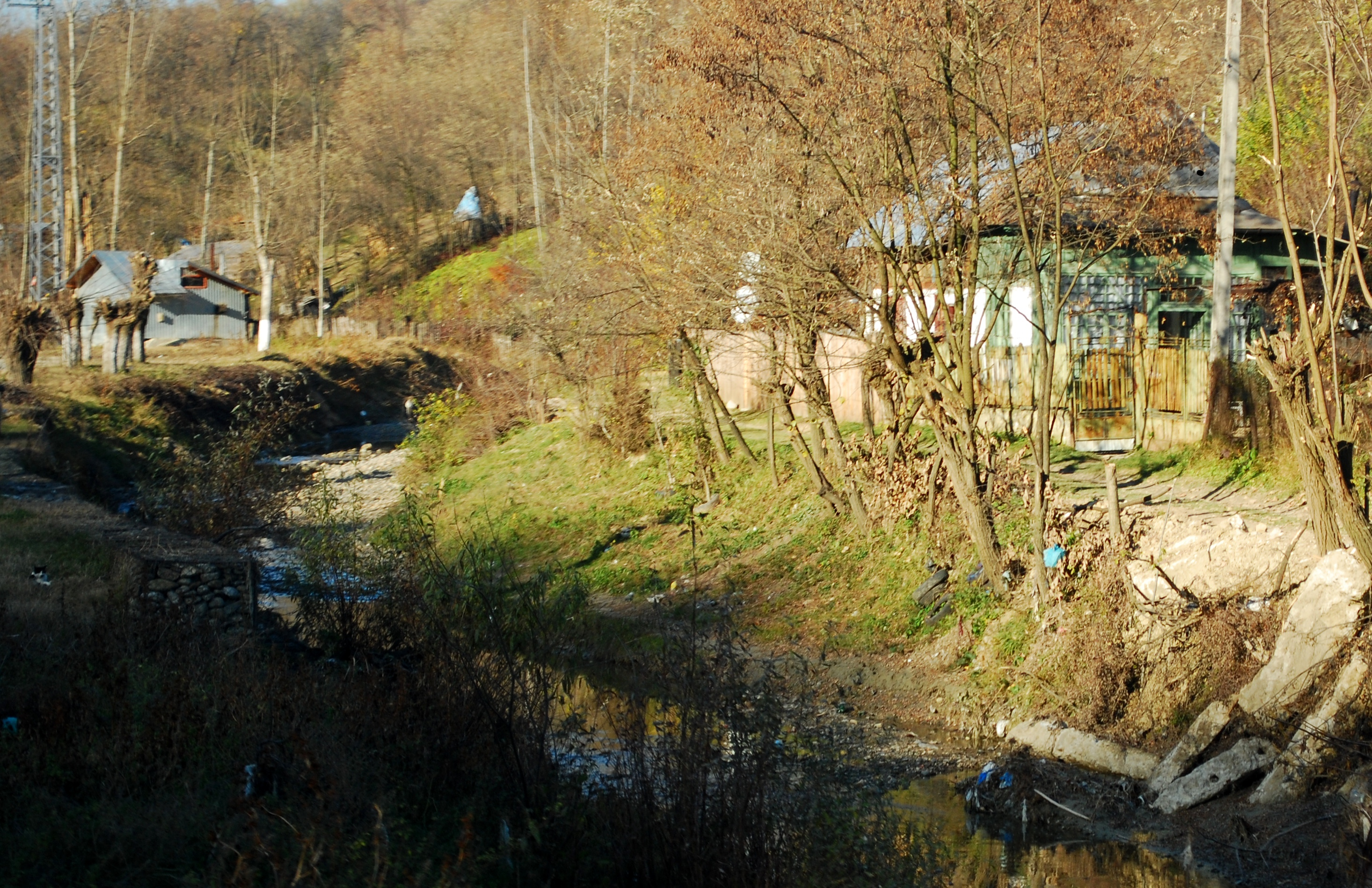

- Location within Romania

Location
- Country: Romania
- Counties: Prahova County
- Villages: Țonțești

Physical characteristics
- Mouth: Telega
  - location: Mislea
  - coordinates: 45.0894°N 25.8257°E
- Length: 7 km (4.3 mi)
- Basin size: 13 km^{2} (5.0 sq mi)

Basin features
- Progression: Telega→ Teleajen→ Prahova→ Ialomița→ Danube→ Black Sea
- Tributaries
  - right: Mislea Seacă

The Mislei is a left tributary of the river Telega in Romania. It discharges into the Telega in the village Mislea. Its length is 7 km (4.3 mi) and its basin size is 13 km^{2} (5.0 sq mi).
