= Bujorel Mocanu =

Romanian footballer

Personal information
- Date of birth: 11 May 1962
- Place of birth: Slănic, Romania
- Date of death: 28 January 2011 (aged 48)
- Place of death: Ploiești, Romania
- Height: 1.81 m (5 ft 11 in)
- Position: Defensive midfielder

Youth career
- 1976–1978: Metalul Plopeni

Senior career*
| Years | Team | Apps | (Gls) |
| 1978–1983 | Metalul Plopeni | | |
| 1980–1981 | → Gloria Buzău (loan) | | |
| 1983–1994 | Petrolul Ploiești (Note: The statistics for the 1984–85, 1988–89 Divizia B seasons are unavailable.) | 222 | (19) |
| 1994–1996 | Steaua II București | 83 | (0) |
| 1996–2000 | Metalul Plopeni | 47 | (0) |
| Total | | 352 | (19) |

Managerial career
- 1996: Steaua II București
- 1996–2000: Metalul Plopeni
- 2006: Gloria Vâlcănești
- * Club domestic league appearances and goals

Bujorel Mocanu (11 May 1962 - 28 January 2011) was a Romanian footballer and manager.

== Honours ==
Petrolul Ploiești

- Divizia B: 1984–85, 1988–89
