= Sergiu Celac =

Romanian politician

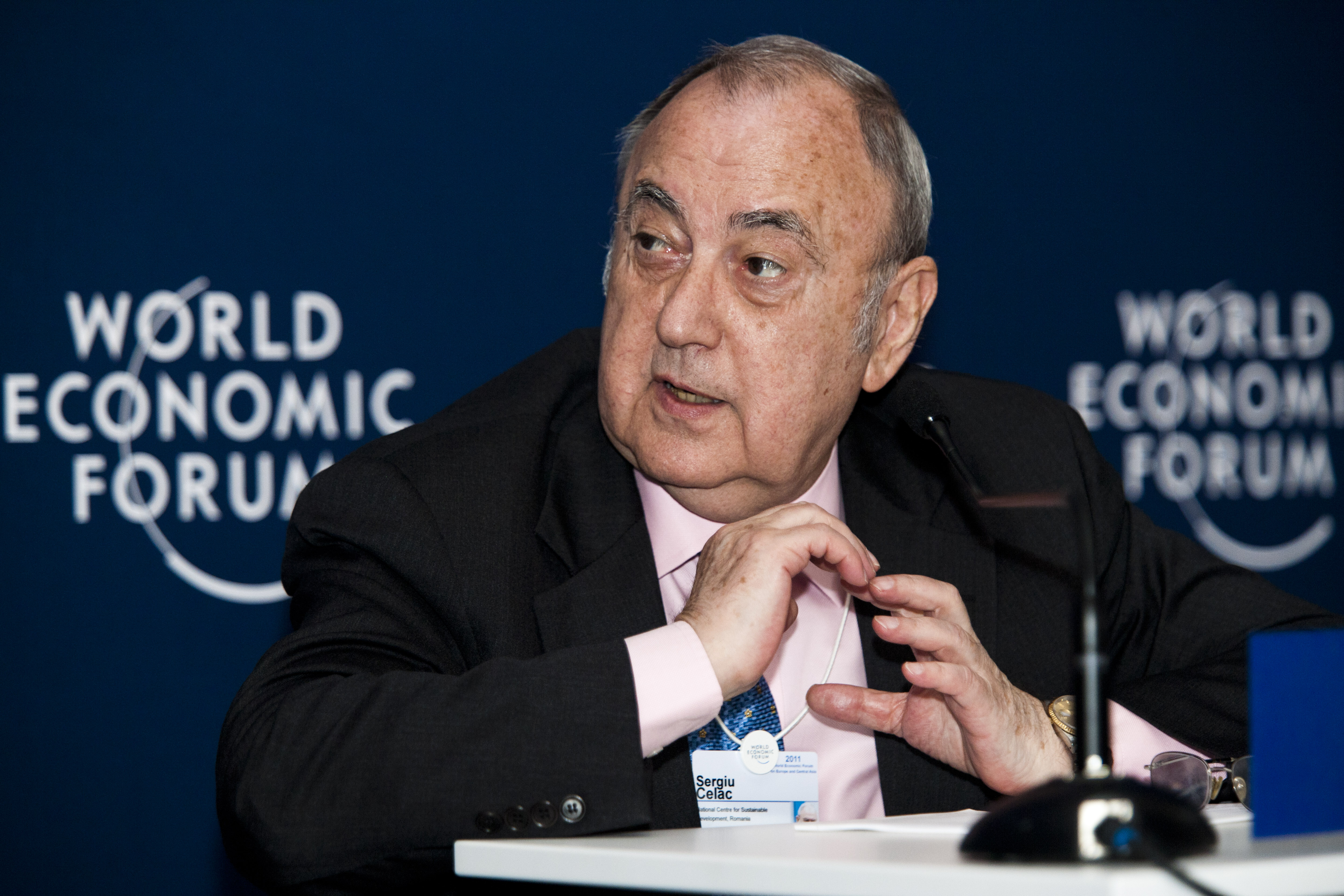
- Celac in 2011

Minister of Foreign Affairs
- In office 26 December 1989 – 28 June 1990
- President: Ion Iliescu
- Preceded by: Ion Stoian
- Succeeded by: Adrian Năstase

Personal details
- Born: May 26, 1939 (age 87) Bucharest, Kingdom of Romania
- Spouse: Sylvia Celac
- Education: University of Bucharest

Sergiu Celac (Romanian pronunciation: [ˈserd͡ dʒju tʃeˈlak]; born 26 May 1939) is a Romanian politician who was the first post-communist Minister of Foreign Affairs of Romania (December 26, 1989 – June 28, 1990) within the Romanian Provisional Government in the aftermath of the Romanian Revolution of 1989.

== Early life ==
Celac was born in Bucharest. In 1961, he graduated from the School of Languages of University of Bucharest.

== Political career ==
=== Diplomatic career ===
Celac started working as a junior clerk at the Ministry of Foreign Affairs of Romania immediately after graduation from the university. By 1963 he received the rank of Attaché and in 1972 he was promoted to a rank of Counselor. From 1962 until 1967, he worked as the personal secretary to the First Deputy Minister of Foreign Affairs. In 1967-1969, he was a part-time secretary to the Foreign Minister on his trips overseas and during Romania's presidency of the UN General Assembly. In 1968-1974, Celac served as Deputy Director and later Director of the Intelligence Analysis and Policy Planning Department. From 1961 through 1978, he also served as an interpreter for Gheorghe Gheorghiu-Dej and Nicolae Ceaușescu. Throughout his career at the Ministry of Foreign Affairs, he was an expert and member of the Romanian delegation to 14 sessions of the UN General Assembly and Disarmament Committee in Geneva. In 1978, Celac was dismissed from the Ministry of Foreign Affairs as an ideologically unreliable employee. After removal from foreign service, he worked at the Encyclopedic Publishing House in Bucharest until the overthrow of the Ceaușescu regime on December 22, 1989.

On December 26, 1989, being one of close allies of new President Ion Iliescu, Celac was appointed Minister of Foreign Affairs of Romania within the Provisional Government of Romania in the aftermath of the anti-communist revolution and served in this position until June 28, 1990. Celac refused to run for Romanian Parliament or join any political party. In 1990-1996, he worked as the Ambassador to the United Kingdom and Ireland (from 1991). In 1996, he was appointed Ambassador at large leading special envoy missions to the Balkans, Central Asia, Caucasus and the Middle East. From April through August 1998, he was the Director of Political Affairs of the ministry. In August 2000, Celac resigned from the Ministry of Foreign Affairs to pursue academic and business interests and work as political analyst and environmental consultant.

=== Post-diplomatic career ===
Since August 2000, Celac is the chairman of EmC Emission Control Ltd. In January 2002, he was hired to be the President & CEO of the Romanian Institute of International Studies of Nicolae Titulescu (IRSI). From March 2002 until December 2004, Celac served as Personal Adviser to the President of Romania. He was also the Alternate Director General at the International Center for Black Sea Studies in Athens in 2003-2007. In 1997 - 2002, he was an invited speaker at many conferences in United States, France, Belgium, United Kingdom, Germany, Italy, Luxembourg, Poland, Ukraine, Jordan, Israel, Turkey, Czech Republic, Greece, Slovakia, Switzerland, Georgia, Azerbaijan, Portugal, Austria, the Netherlands, Brazil. His publications include more than 40 fiction and non-fiction political science books, and more than 500 essays and articles. He also co-chairs the Millennium III Quarterly Learned Journal.

Currently Celac is the Senior Adviser at National Center for Sustainable Development, Vice President of Romanian Association for the Club of Rome and Associate Professor at the Romanian Diplomatic Institute.

== Awards ==
Celac is the Grand Officer of the National Order for Faithful Service (Romania, 2000).

Celac is married to Silvia Celac with no children.

== See also ==
- Foreign relations of Romania
- Nicolae Ceaușescu
