= Vâlcănești =

- Commune
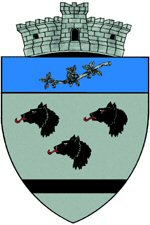
- Coat of arms

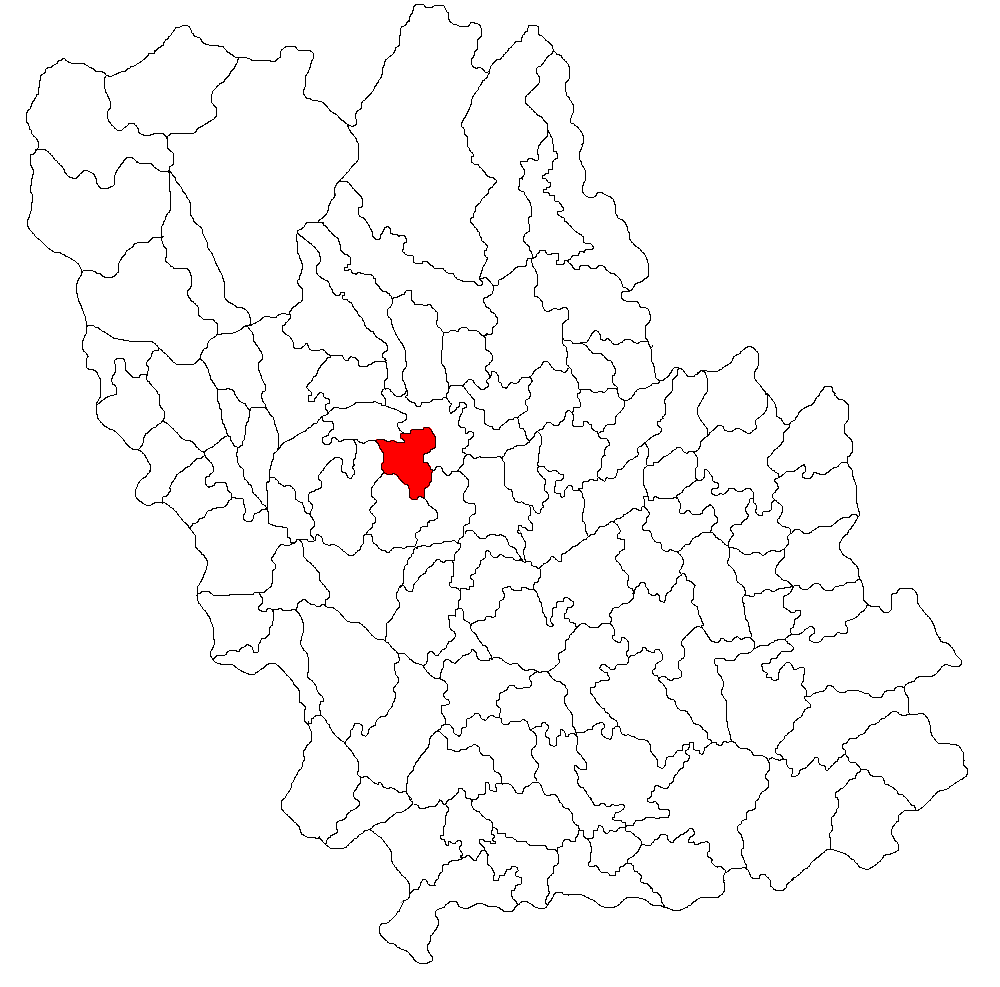
- Location in Prahova County

- Location in Romania
- Coordinates: 45°7′N 25°56′E
- Country: Romania
- County: Prahova

Government
  - Mayor (2020–2024): Adrian Manole (PNL)
- Area: 37.22 km^{2} (14.37 sq mi)
- Elevation: 271 m (889 ft)
- Population (2021-12-01): 3,244
  - Density: 87/km^{2} (230/sq mi)
- Time zone: EET/EEST (UTC+2/+3)
- Postal code: 107655
- Area code: +(40) 244
- Vehicle reg.: PH
- Website: comunavilcanesti.ro

Vâlcănești is a commune in Prahova County, Muntenia, Romania. It is composed of three villages: Cârjari, Trestioara, and Vâlcănești.

The commune lies on the banks on the river Cosmina, in the foothills of the Sub Carpathians. It is located in the central part of the county, 27 km (17 mi) north of the county seat, Ploiești.

Historical population
Year	Pop.	±%
1992	4,235	—
2002	3,994	−5.7%
2011	3,502	−12.3%
2021	3,244	−7.4%
Source: Census data

At the 2011 census, Vâlcănești had 3,502 residents; of those, 91.03% were ethnic Romanians and 6.25% were Roma. At the 2021 census, the commune had a population of 3,244, of which 87.39% were Romanians and 6.38% Roma.
