= Cosminele =

- Commune
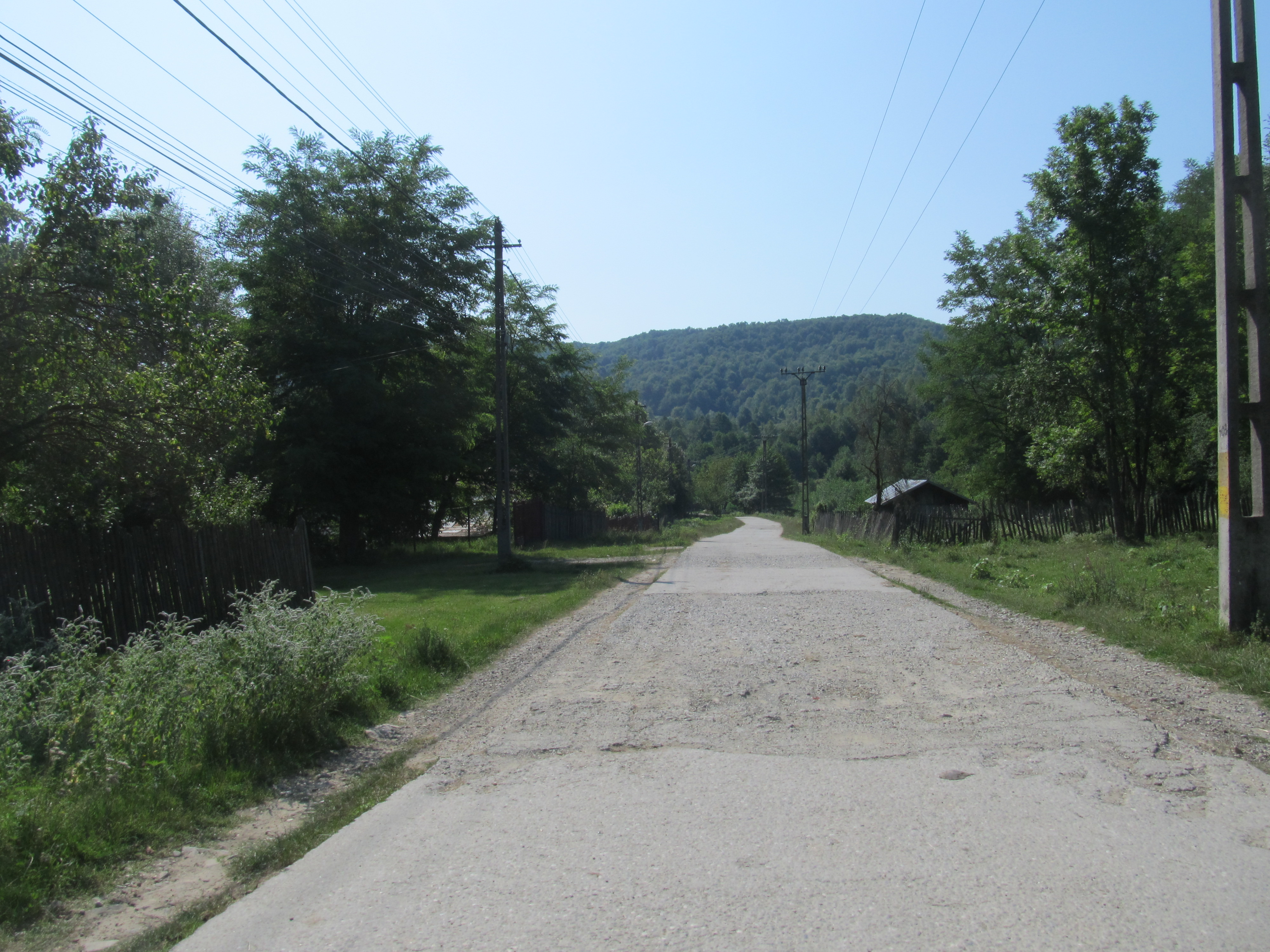
- Cosmina de Jos

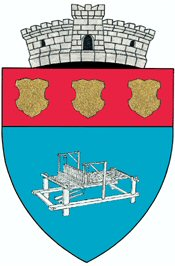
- Coat of arms

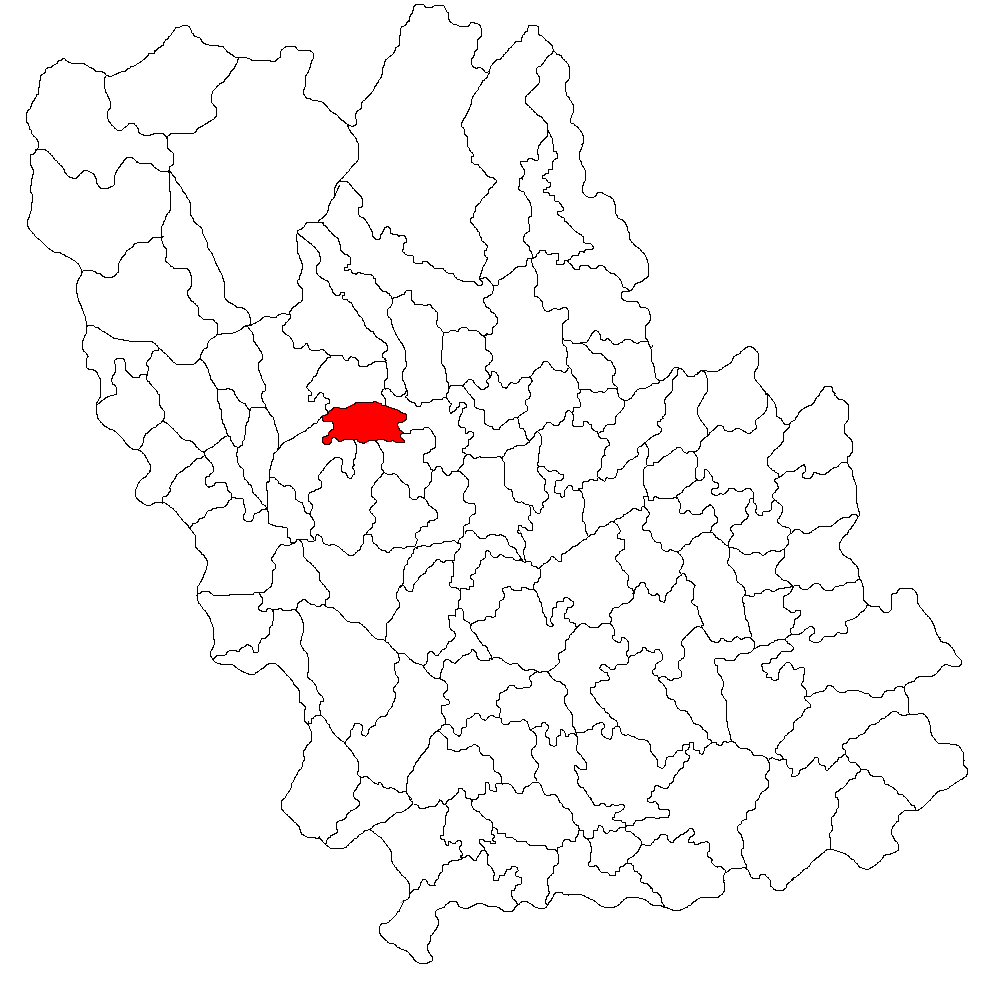
- Location in Prahova County

- Location in Romania
- Coordinates: 45°09′N 25°53′E
- Country: Romania
- County: Prahova

Government
  - Mayor (2024–2028): Iulian Nae (PNL)
- Area: 25.06 km^{2} (9.68 sq mi)
- Elevation: 339 m (1,112 ft)
- Population (2021-12-01): 926
  - Density: 37.0/km^{2} (95.7/sq mi)
- Time zone: UTC+02:00 (EET)
  - Summer (DST): UTC+03:00 (EEST)
- Postal code: 107185
- Area code: +(40) 244
- Vehicle reg.: PH
- Website: comunacosminele.ro

Cosminele is a commune in Prahova County, Muntenia, Romania. It is composed of four villages: Cosmina de Jos (the commune centre), Cosmina de Sus, Drăghicești, and Poiana Trestiei.

Historical population
Year	Pop.	±%
1992	1,351	—
2002	1,266	−6.3%
2011	1,068	−15.6%
2021	926	−13.3%
Source: Census data

== Natives ==
- Nicolae Simache (1905–1972), teacher, historian, and writer
