= Ciumeghiu =

- Commune
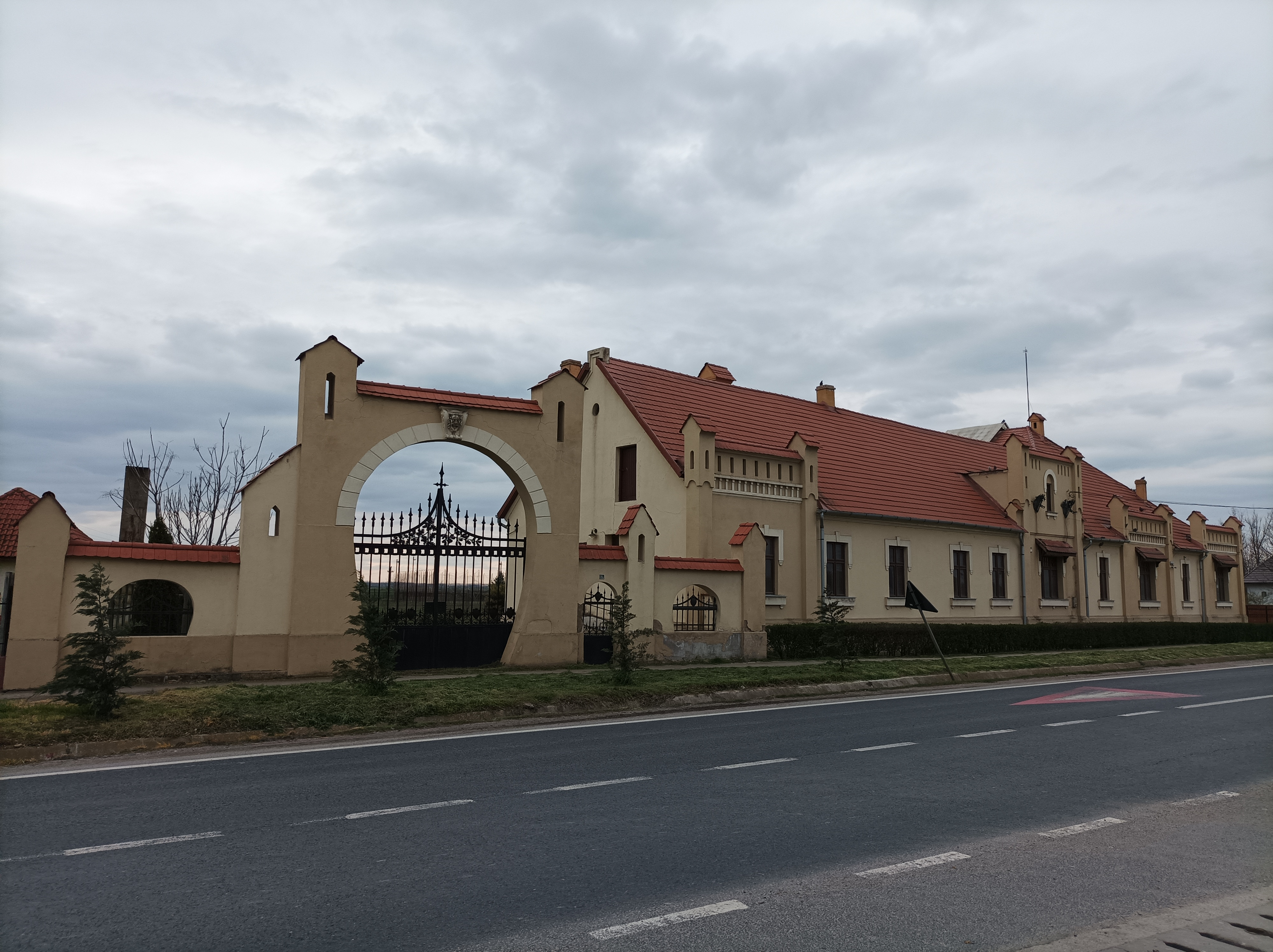
- Miskolczy Manor in Ciumeghiu

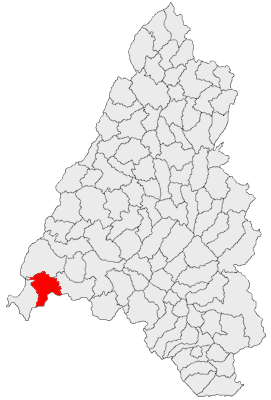
- Location in Bihor County

- Location in Romania
- Coordinates: 46°44′N 21°35′E
- Country: Romania
- County: Bihor

Government
  - Mayor (2024–2028): Gheorghe Sorin Huple (PSD)
- Area: 110.28 km^{2} (42.58 sq mi)
- Elevation: 91 m (299 ft)
- Population (2021-12-01): 4,260
  - Density: 38.6/km^{2} (100/sq mi)
- Time zone: UTC+02:00 (EET)
  - Summer (DST): UTC+03:00 (EEST)
- Postal code: 417195
- Area code: +(40) x59
- Vehicle reg.: BH
- Website: www.comunaciumeghiu.ro

Ciumeghiu (Hungarian: Illye; German: Egisberg) is a commune in Bihor County, Crișana, Romania. It is composed of three villages: Boiu (Mezőbaj), Ciumeghiu, and Ghiorac (Erdőgyarak).

At the 2011 census, the commune had 4,297 inhabitants; 50.6% were Romanians, 24.6% Hungarians, and 24.5% Roma. At the 2021 census, Ciumeghiu had a population of 4,260; of those, 43.9% were Romanians, 31.13% Roma, and 18.87% Hungarians.

== See also ==
- Cighid, children's home in Communist and early post-Communist Romania, with extermination camp-like conditions, located in Ghiorac
