= Slănic =

- Town
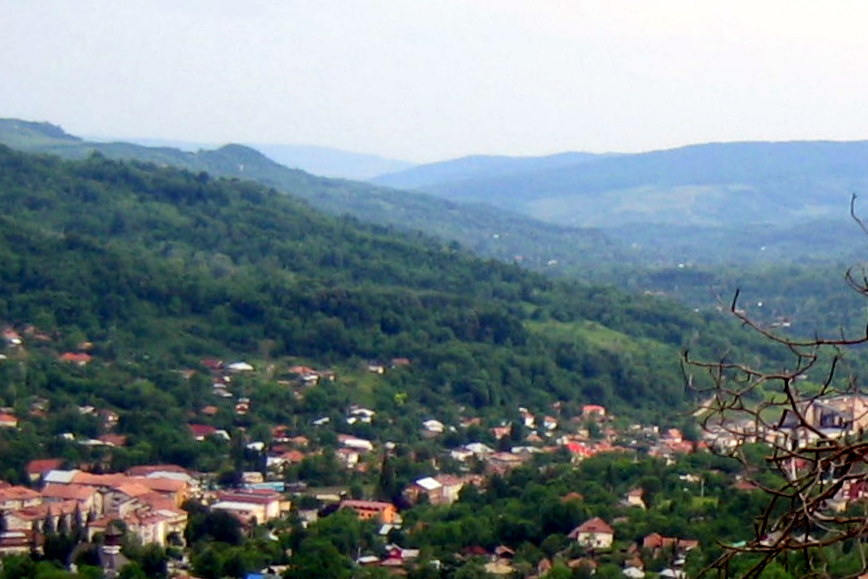

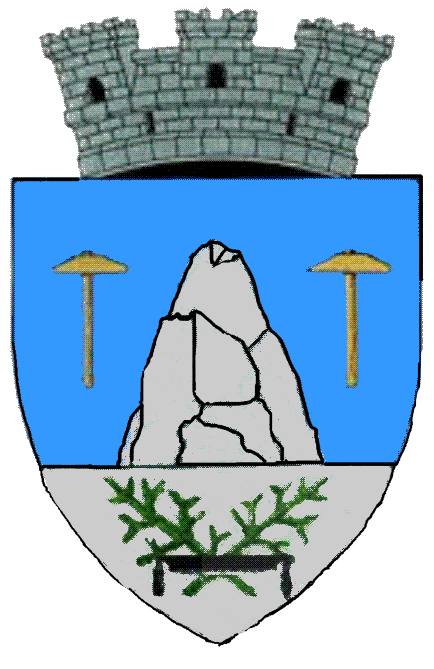
- Coat of arms

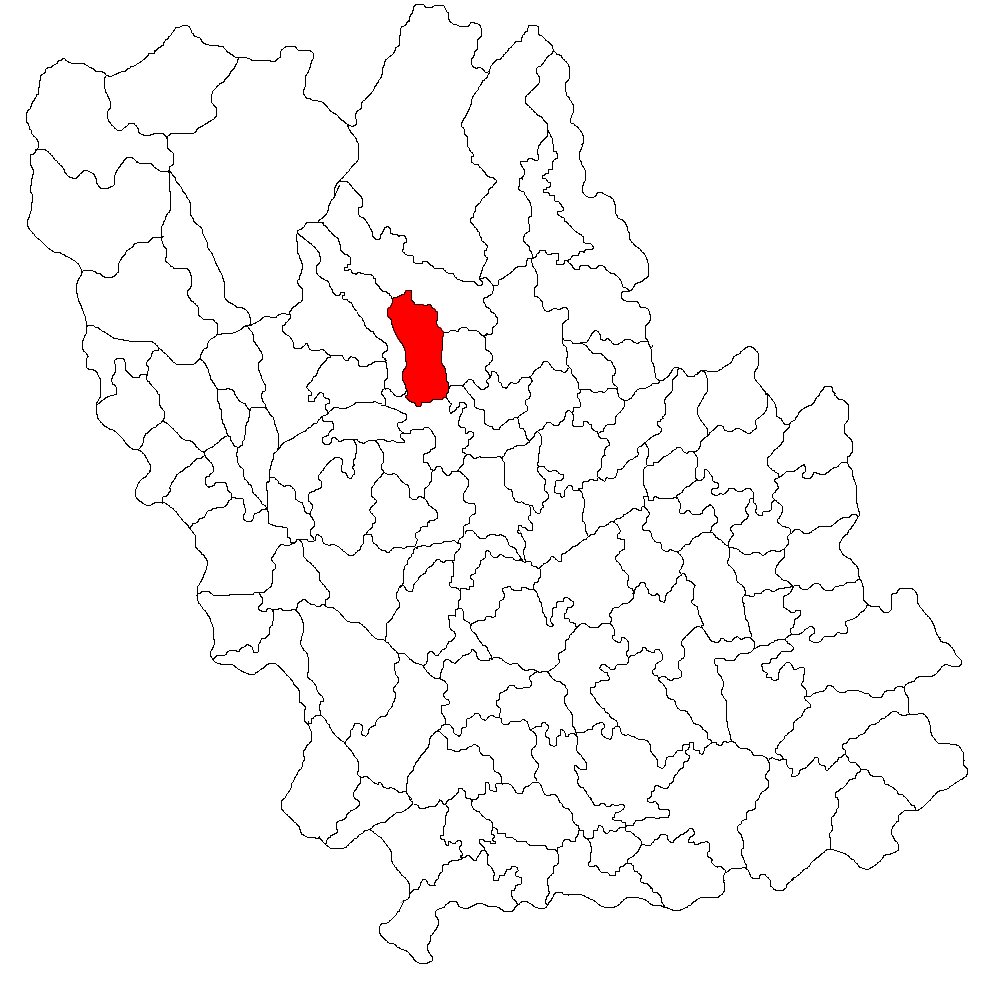
- Location in Prahova County

- Location in Romania
- Coordinates: 45°14′0″N 25°56′21″E
- Country: Romania
- County: Prahova

Government
  - Mayor (2024–2028): Daneluș Costea (PSD)
- Area: 39.2 km^{2} (15.1 sq mi)
- Elevation: 413 m (1,355 ft)
- Population (2021-12-01): 4,669
  - Density: 119/km^{2} (308/sq mi)
- Time zone: UTC+02:00 (EET)
  - Summer (DST): UTC+03:00 (EEST)
- Postal code: 106200
- Area code: (+40) 02 44
- Vehicle reg.: PH
- Website: www.primariaslanic.ro

Slănic (Romanian pronunciation: [sləˈnik]) is one of the 12 towns of Prahova County, Muntenia, Romania, historically and currently known as a salt extraction center, as well as a spa town, with salt lakes. Two villages, Groșani and Prăjani, are administered by the town.

== Etymology ==
As its name (salt in Slavonic) suggests, most of Slănic's history and economy are directly related to the presence of relatively large quantities of salt underground, and even in open air.

Slănic is also the name of the creek flowing through the town, tributary of Vărbilău River, which in turn is a tributary of Teleajen River.

Although technically incorrect, the compounded name Slănic Prahova is also being used, especially in other parts of Romania. This alternative name was probably generated to help discern between Slănic and another Romanian town, Slănic-Moldova.

== Climate ==
Slănic has a humid continental climate (Cfb in the Köppen climate classification).

Climate data for Slănic
Month	Jan	Feb	Mar	Apr	May	Jun	Jul	Aug	Sep	Oct	Nov	Dec	Year
Mean daily maximum °C (°F)	1.9 (35.4)	4 (39)	8.7 (47.7)	14.2 (57.6)	19.1 (66.4)	22.7 (72.9)	24.8 (76.6)	24.9 (76.8)	19.8 (67.6)	14 (57)	8.5 (47.3)	3.7 (38.7)	13.9 (56.9)
Daily mean °C (°F)	−2.4 (27.7)	−0.6 (30.9)	3.7 (38.7)	9.4 (48.9)	14.5 (58.1)	18.3 (64.9)	20.3 (68.5)	20.3 (68.5)	15.3 (59.5)	9.5 (49.1)	4.6 (40.3)	−0.4 (31.3)	9.4 (48.9)
Mean daily minimum °C (°F)	−6.1 (21.0)	−4.7 (23.5)	−1.2 (29.8)	4.1 (39.4)	9.2 (48.6)	13.2 (55.8)	15.3 (59.5)	15.3 (59.5)	10.9 (51.6)	5.6 (42.1)	1.3 (34.3)	−3.7 (25.3)	4.9 (40.9)
Average precipitation mm (inches)	45 (1.8)	44 (1.7)	59 (2.3)	88 (3.5)	130 (5.1)	138 (5.4)	136 (5.4)	101 (4.0)	72 (2.8)	62 (2.4)	55 (2.2)	53 (2.1)	983 (38.7)
Source: https://en.climate-data.org/europe/romania/prahova/slanic-15400/

== Demographics ==
Historical population
Year	Pop.	±%
1912	5,512	—
1930	6,306	+14.4%
1948	6,495	+3.0%
1956	6,842	+5.3%
1966	7,307	+6.8%
1977	7,780	+6.5%
1992	7,654	−1.6%
2002	7,249	−5.3%
2011	5,934	−18.1%
2021	4,669	−21.3%
Source: Census data

== Notable people ==
- Mihai Iliescu
- Bujorel Mocanu
