= Plopeni =

- Town
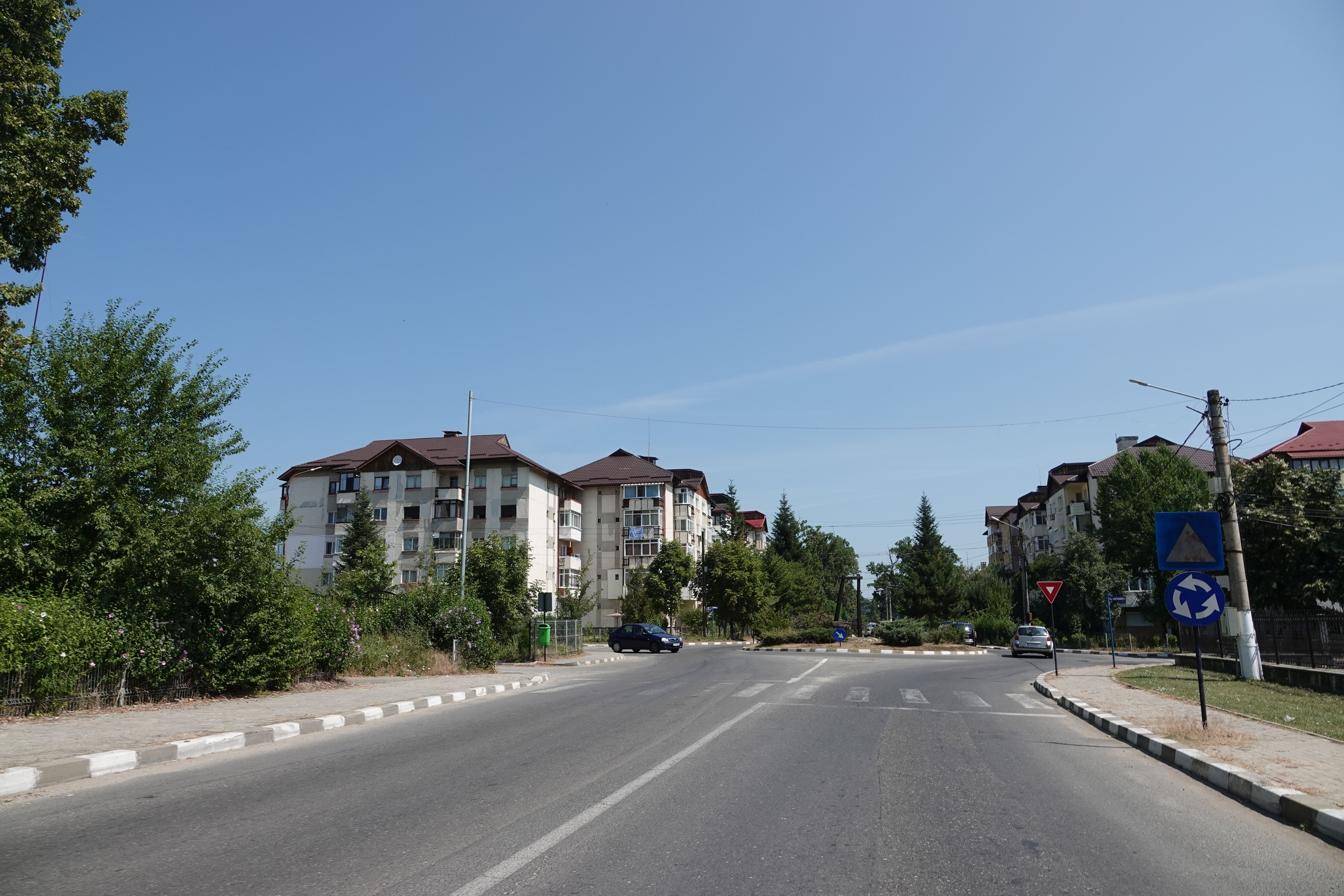

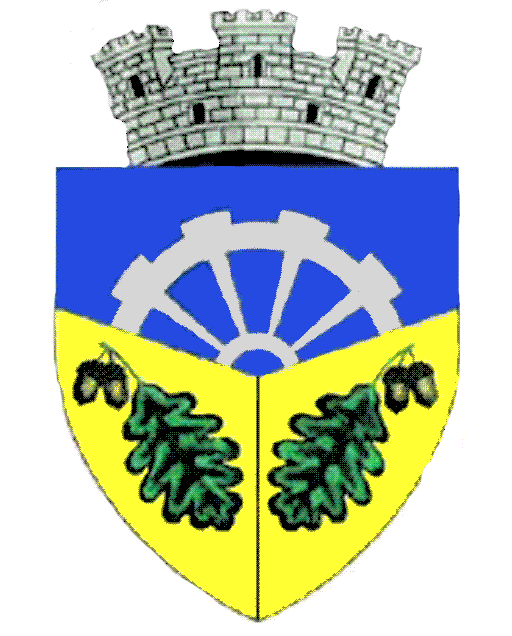
- Coat of arms

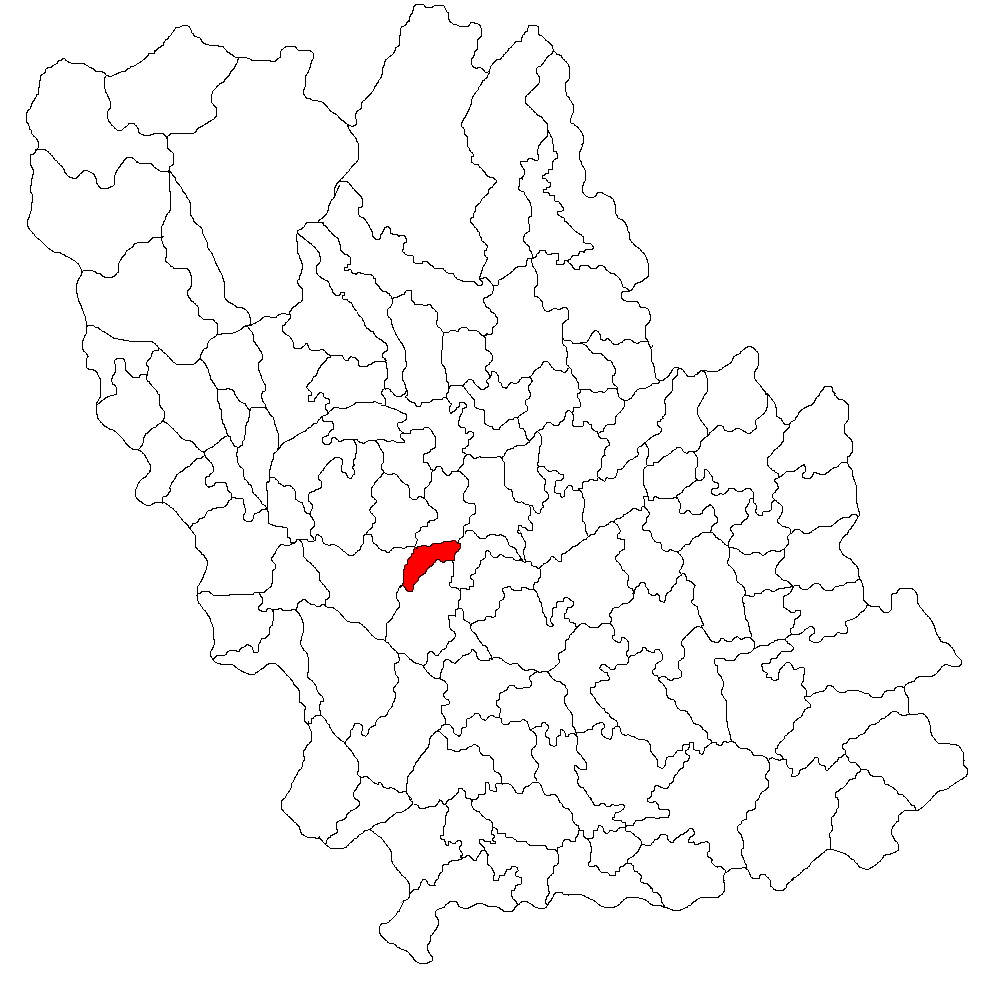
- Location in Prahova County

- Location in Romania
- Coordinates: 45°03′N 25°57′E
- Country: Romania
- County: Prahova

Government
  - Mayor (2024–2028): Dragoș Niță (PNL)
- Area: 4.73 km^{2} (1.83 sq mi)
- Elevation: 240 m (790 ft)
- Population (2021-12-01): 6,709
  - Density: 1,420/km^{2} (3,670/sq mi)
- Time zone: UTC+02:00 (EET)
  - Summer (DST): UTC+03:00 (EEST)
- Postal code: 105900
- Area code: (+40) 0244
- Vehicle reg.: PH
- Website: www.primariaplopeni.ro

Plopeni (Romanian pronunciation: [ploˈpenʲ]) is a town in Prahova County, Muntenia, Romania, with a population of 6,709 as of 2021.

The town is situated at the northern edge of the Wallachian Plain, at an altitude of 240 m (790 ft), on the right bank of the Teleajen River. It is located in the central part of Prahova County, 15 km (9.3 mi) north of the county seat, Ploiești.

Plopeni is crossed by county road DJ102, which connects it to Păulești and Ploiești, where it meets national road DN1B. The Plopeni train station serves the CFR Line 306, which starts at Ploiești South station and ends in Slănic.

Historical population
Year	Pop.	±%
1977	6,071	—
1992	10,284	+69.4%
2002	10,083	−2.0%
2011	7,509	−25.5%
2021	6,709	−10.7%
Source: Census data

== Climate ==
Plopeni has a humid continental climate (Cfb in the Köppen climate classification).

Climate data for Plopeni
Month	Jan	Feb	Mar	Apr	May	Jun	Jul	Aug	Sep	Oct	Nov	Dec	Year
Mean daily maximum °C (°F)	2.7 (36.9)	5.4 (41.7)	10.4 (50.7)	15.9 (60.6)	21 (70)	24.6 (76.3)	26.8 (80.2)	27 (81)	21.7 (71.1)	15.6 (60.1)	9.8 (49.6)	4.6 (40.3)	15.5 (59.9)
Daily mean °C (°F)	−1.6 (29.1)	0.5 (32.9)	5 (41)	10.6 (51.1)	15.9 (60.6)	19.9 (67.8)	22 (72)	22 (72)	16.7 (62.1)	10.7 (51.3)	5.5 (41.9)	0.3 (32.5)	10.6 (51.2)
Mean daily minimum °C (°F)	−5.4 (22.3)	−3.8 (25.2)	−0.5 (31.1)	4.5 (40.1)	9.8 (49.6)	14 (57)	16.1 (61.0)	16.2 (61.2)	11.5 (52.7)	6 (43)	1.8 (35.2)	−3 (27)	5.6 (42.1)
Average precipitation mm (inches)	45 (1.8)	41 (1.6)	52 (2.0)	65 (2.6)	83 (3.3)	88 (3.5)	75 (3.0)	50 (2.0)	59 (2.3)	59 (2.3)	53 (2.1)	54 (2.1)	724 (28.6)
Source: https://en.climate-data.org/europe/romania/prahova/plopeni-45730/
