= Telega, Prahova =

Telega
- Commune
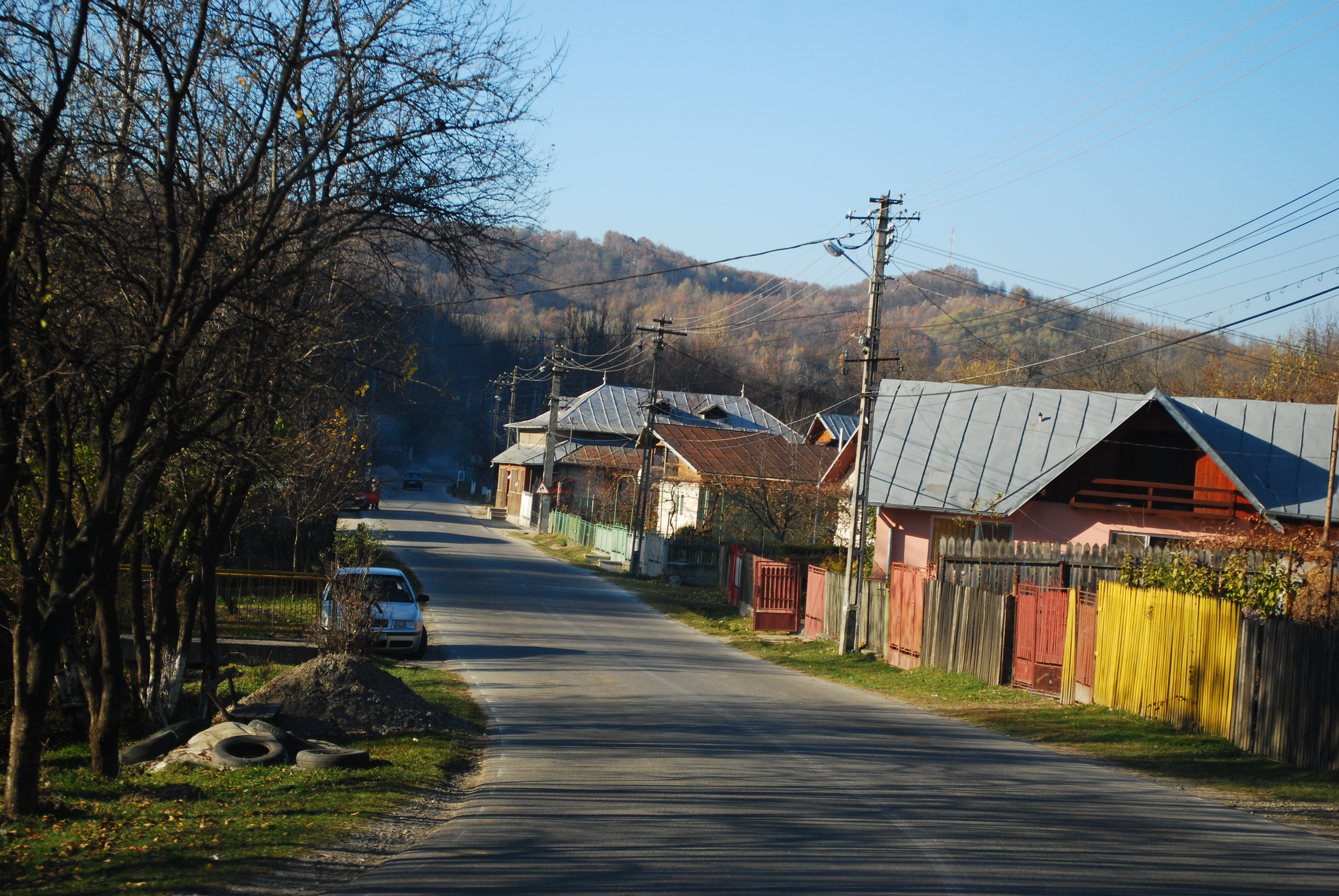
- Road in Telega

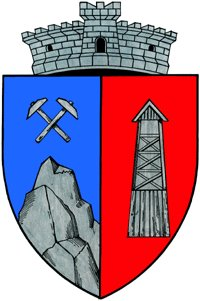
- Coat of arms

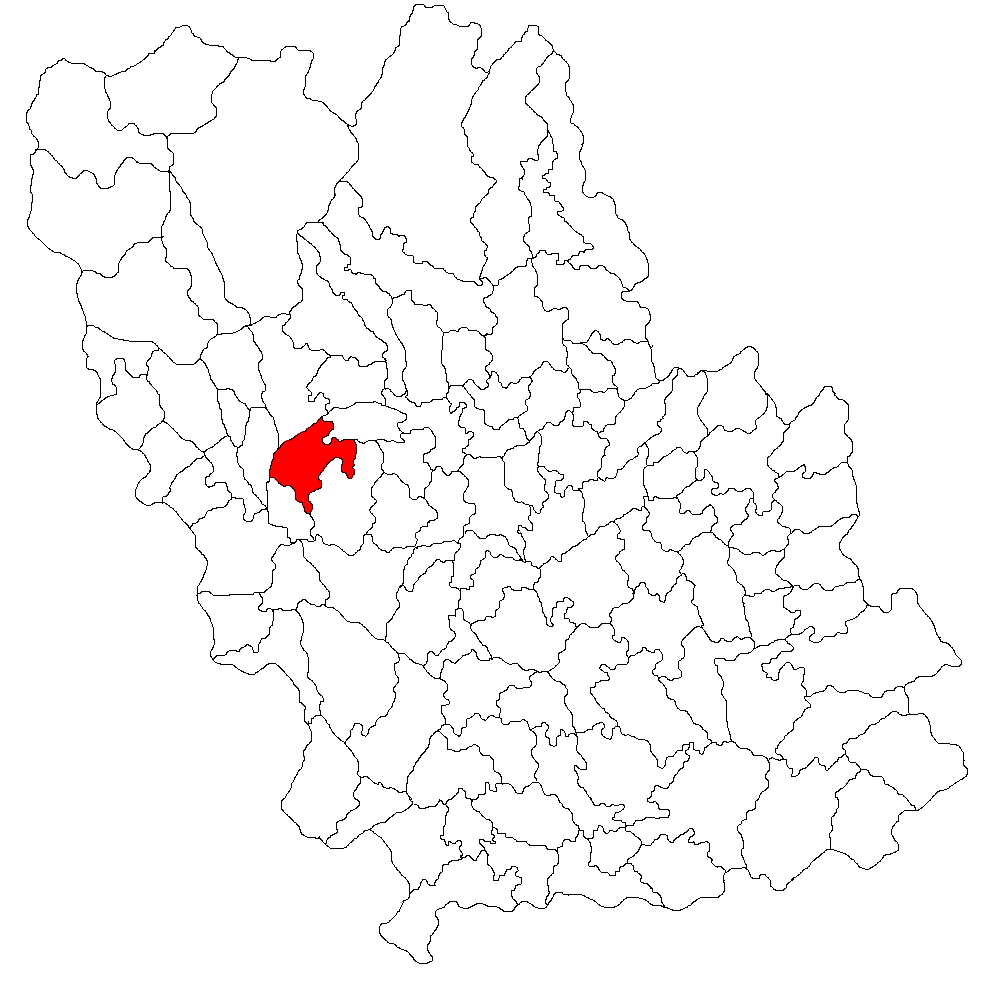
- Location in Prahova County

- Location in Romania
- Coordinates: 45°08′N 25°47′E
- Country: Romania
- County: Prahova

Government
  - Mayor (2020–2024): Costel Brezeanu (PSD)
- Elevation: 550 m (1,800 ft)
- Population (2021-12-01): 4,990
- Time zone: UTC+02:00 (EET)
  - Summer (DST): UTC+03:00 (EEST)
- Postal code: 107600
- Area code: +(40) 244
- Vehicle reg.: PH
- Website: comunatelega.ro

Telega is a commune in Prahova County, Muntenia, Romania. It is composed of six villages: Boșilcești, Buștenari, Doftana, Melicești, Telega, and Țonțești.

The commune is located in the west-central part of the county, in the Sub Carpathian hills, 36 km (22 mi) northwest of the county seat, Ploiești. The highest hill in the area, Măceș, has an altitude of 815 m (2,674 ft). The river Doftana flows just west of commune, separating it from the city of Câmpina. The Purcaru is a left tributary of the Doftana; the confluence of the two rivers is in the village Doftana. The creek Sărata originates in Melicești and flows from northwest to southeast through Telega towards the river Teleajen.

Doftana village is the site of the former Doftana prison. Telega railway station was the terminus of the former Câmpina–Câmpinița–Telega railway line.

Historical population
Year	Pop.	±%
1992	6,819	—
2002	6,465	−5.2%
2011	5,523	−14.6%
2021	4,990	−9.7%
Source: Census data

== Natives ==
- Ion Stoian (1927–2012), communist politician

== Notes ==
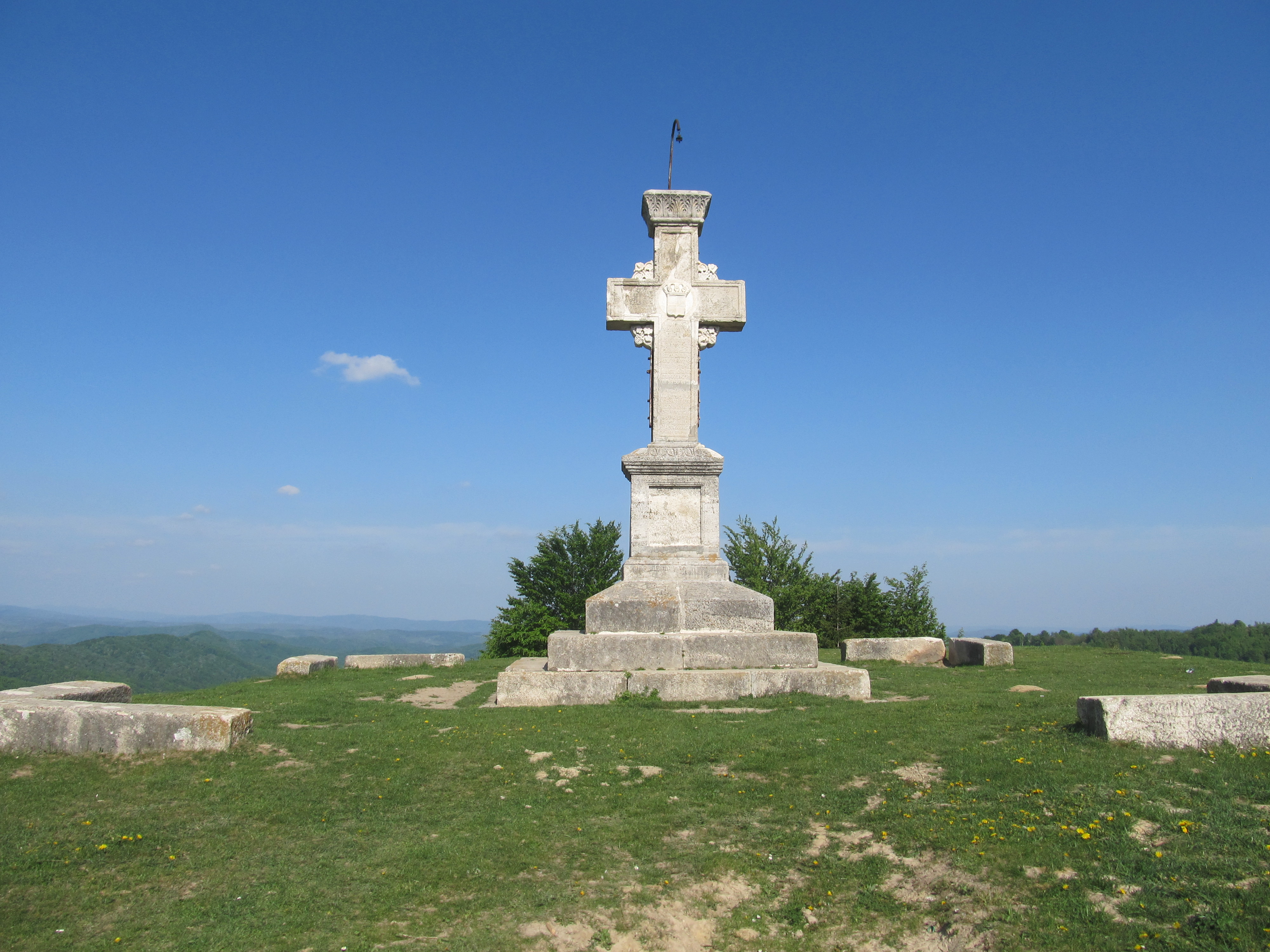
Ruler's Cross, Melicești

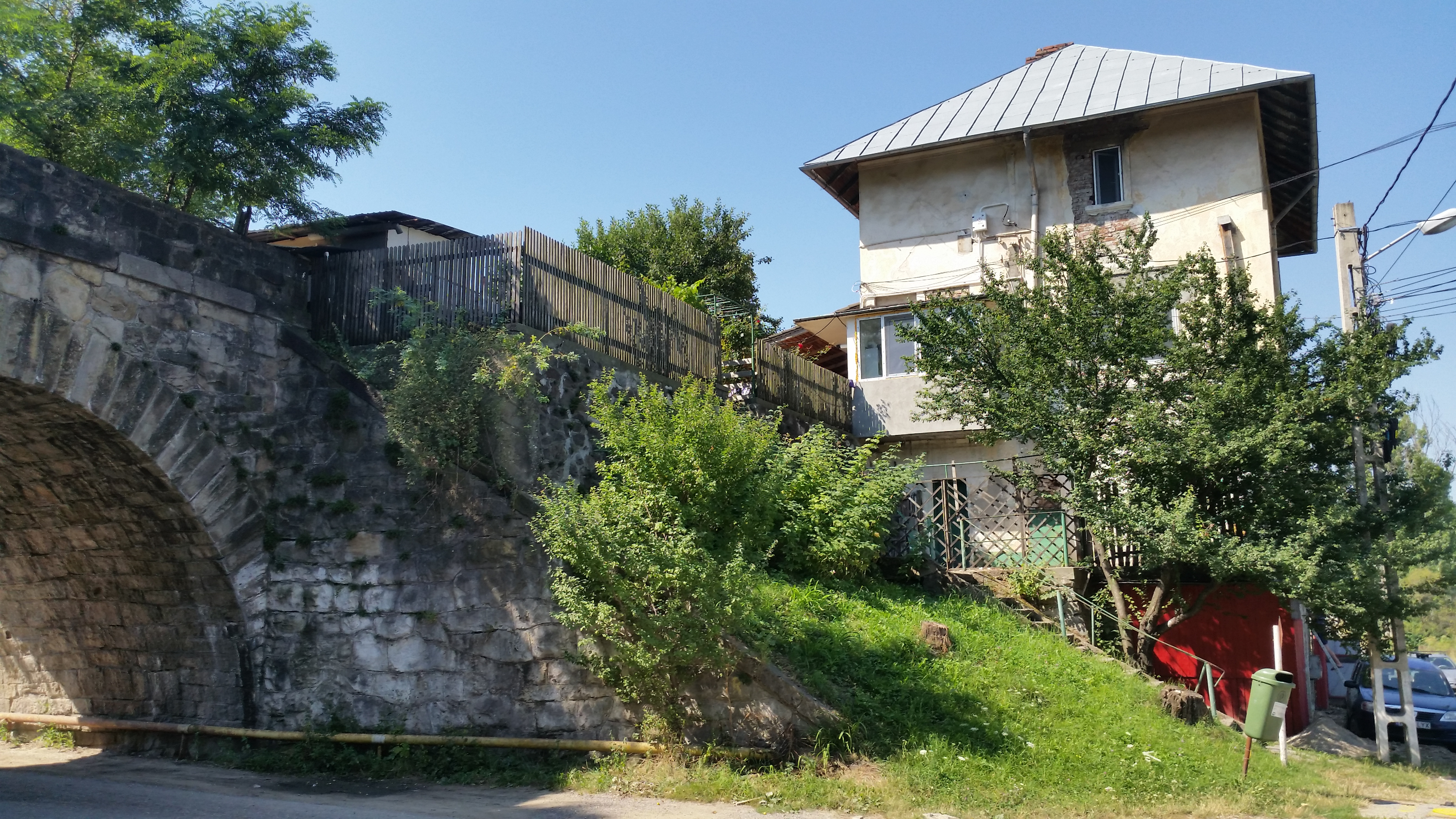
Former Telega train station

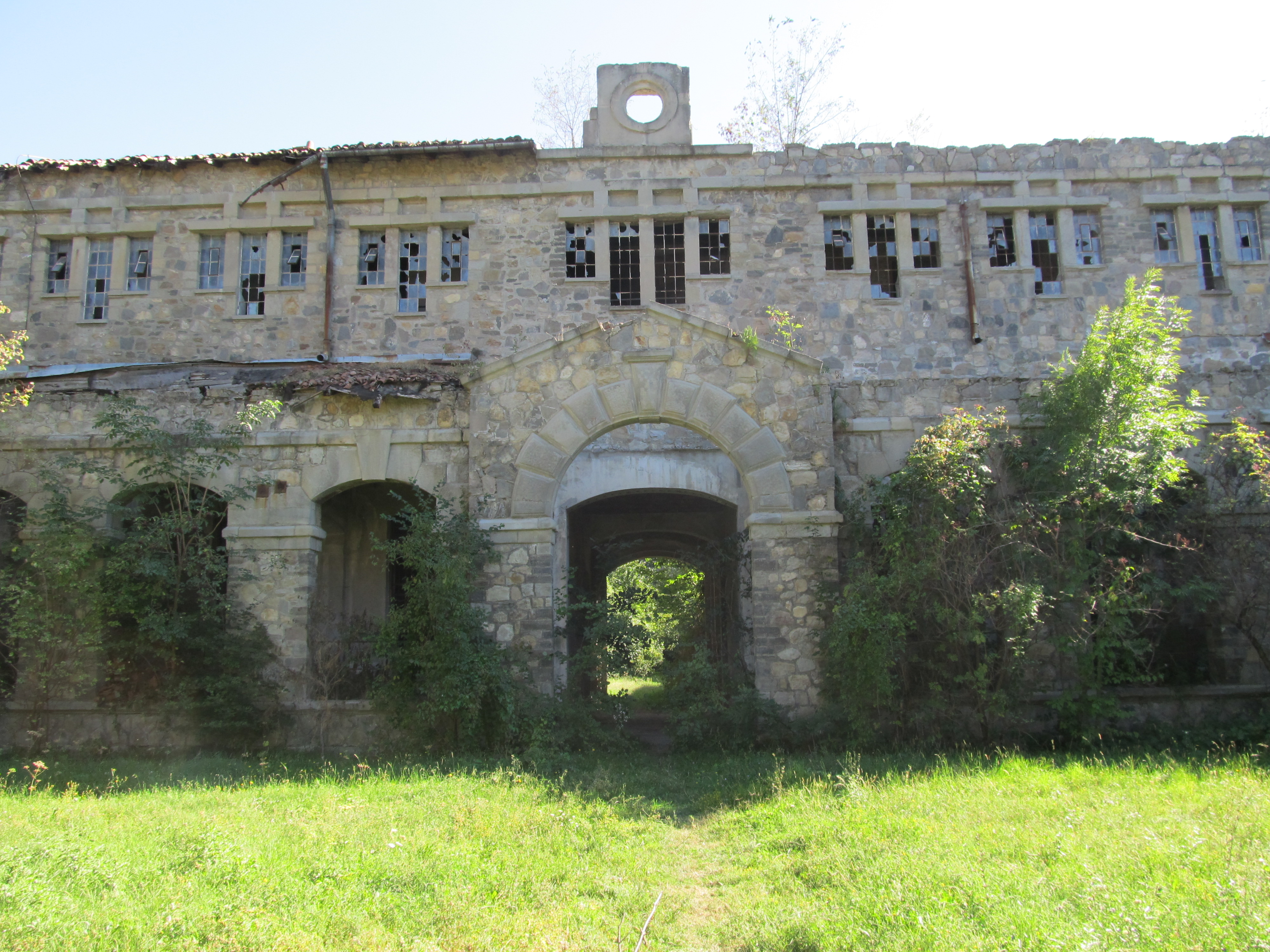
Former Doftana prison
