= Primvs derby =

Romanian football rivalry

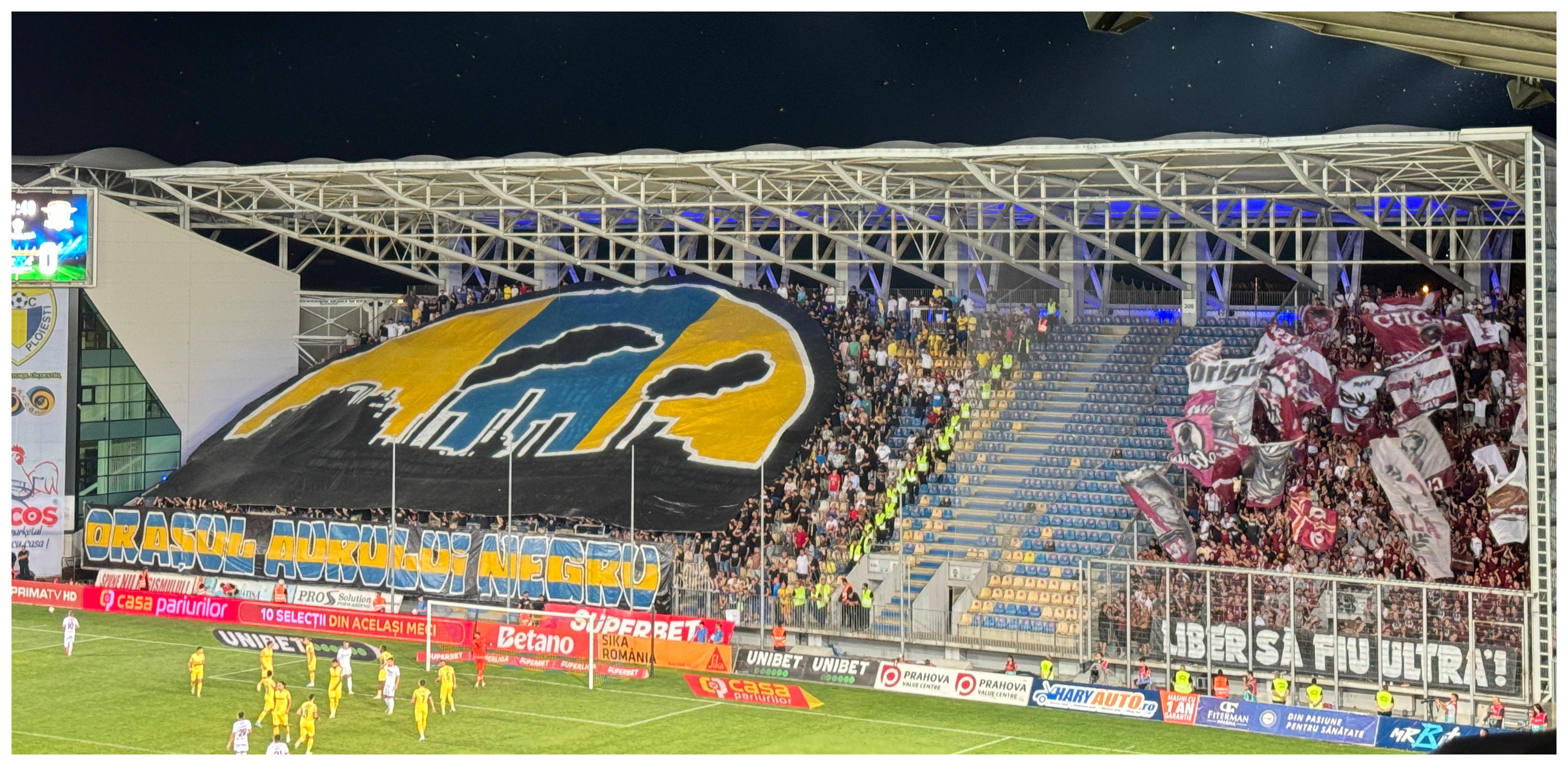
- Petrolul (left) and Rapid fans (right) during a league match
- Other names: Unicul derbi
- Location: Muntenia, Romania
- Teams: Rapid București; Petrolul Ploiești
- First meeting: 1 November 1931; Southern League - Bucharest; Juventus 3–3 CFR București
- Latest meeting: 21 August 2026; Liga I Petrolul 0-2 Rapid
- Next meeting: 16 January 2027; Liga I Rapid vs Petrolul
- Stadiums: Ilie Oană Stadium (Petrolul); Stadionul Rapid-Giulești (Rapid)

Statistics
- Total meetings: Official matches: 133
- Most wins: Official matches: Rapid București (64)
- Top scorer: Mircea Dridea (11)
- Largest victory: 22 September 1963; Divizia A Rapid 0-6 Petrolul

The Primvs derby, also known as The Only Derby (Romanian: Unicul derbi), is a Romanian football derby contested between Liga I clubs Rapid București and Petrolul Ploiești. The name derives from the rivalry's status as one of the earliest in Romanian football, dating back to the interwar period, when both clubs were based in Bucharest and emerged as leading competitive sides in the country.

The rivalry is usually contested at least twice per season in league competition, and also extends to matches in the Cupa României. Throughout their histories, the two clubs have alternated between periods of success and decline, competing for domestic honors during their peak years and experiencing setbacks such as bankruptcy or relegation to the second division.

At various times, the clubs have also faced each other in promotion battles to return to the top flight, seeking to re-establish their status among Romania's leading teams.

== History ==
=== Origins and early encounters ===
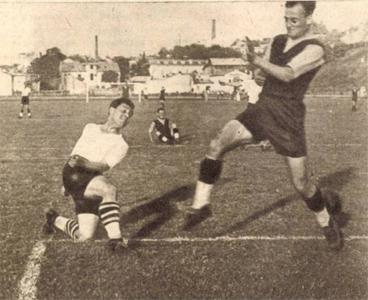
Neacșu (Juventus) challenging Georgescu (CFR) during a match on 25 May 1935, won 4–3 by CFR

Petrolul Ploiești was founded in 1924 in Bucharest under the name Juventus, following the merger of Triumf and Romcomit, and initially played its home matches at Romcomit Stadium. Rapid București, originally known as CFR București, was established a year earlier, in 1923, by workers from the Grivița railway workshops.

The two clubs first met competitively on 1 November 1931, in the Bucharest regional championship, with the match ending in a 3–3 draw.

Following World War II, both clubs underwent multiple name changes as a result of political reorganization under Romania’s communist regime. In 1952, Juventus, by then known as Flacăra București, was relocated approximately 60 kilometres north to Ploiești. Rapid reverted to its traditional name in November 1957, while the Ploiești-based club adopted the name Petrolul in December 1958.

=== Championship battles of the 1960s ===
The rivalry reached one of its most prominent peaks during the 1960s, when both clubs regularly competed for the national title. The decade featured several high-scoring and unpredictable encounters. In the 1962–63 season, Rapid defeated Petrolul 6–1 at Stadionul „23 August”, only for Petrolul to respond the following season with a 6–0 victory at the same venue. Both results remain among the most notable in the history of the fixture.

During the 1965–66 season, the two clubs were again direct competitors for the championship. Coached by Constantin Cernăianu, Petrolul secured the league title, finishing ahead of Rapid. A decisive moment came in a 1–0 home victory over Rapid, with Virgil Dridea scoring directly from a corner kick, a goal that proved crucial in Petrolul’s title-winning campaign.

Rapid claimed its first championship the following season, aided by a crucial 0–0 draw away to Petrolul in Ploiești, highlighted by a strong performance from goalkeeper Rică Răducanu. The match is also remembered for the large number of Rapid supporters who traveled to Ploiești, including folk singer Ioana Radu, some of whom reportedly pledged to walk back to Bucharest should Rapid secure the title.

=== Relegations, promotion battles and a cup final ===
The rivalry continued into the following decade. In March 1970, Petrolul defeated Rapid 2–0, a result that contributed to the beginning of a downturn for the Giulești side, who eventually lost the championship to UTA Arad by two points.

The 1973–74 season marked a low point for both clubs, as Rapid and Petrolul were relegated to the second tier. The downturn coincided with the retirement of several key players on both sides, including the Dridea brothers, Mocanu and Mișu Ionescu at Petrolul, and Nicky Dumitriu, Dan Coe, Puiu Ionescu, Lupescu and Greavu at Rapid.

Rapid returned to the top flight after one season, while Petrolul spent three years in the second division before earning promotion in 1976–77. Their return was guided by coach Valentin Stănescu, who had previously led Rapid to its first league title in 1966–67.

Between 1978 and 1982, the two clubs competed in the same series of the second division, with the 1981–82 season proving particularly competitive. Petrolul and Rapid alternated at the top of the table, with a key match seeing Petrolul win 1–0 at home through a late goal by Ion Ștefănescu. The decisive encounter came in the spring of 1982 at Stadionul Steaua, watched by 35,000 spectators, where Rapid recorded a 5–1 victory. Despite the loss, Petrolul finished two points ahead and secured promotion, while Rapid returned to the top flight a year later, again under Stănescu.

Both clubs later re-established themselves in the first division, with Petrolul promoted in 1988–89 and Rapid in 1989–90. Each also returned to European competition after long absences: Petrolul faced Anderlecht in the 1990–91 UEFA Cup, while Rapid played Internazionale Milano in the 1993–94 UEFA Cup.

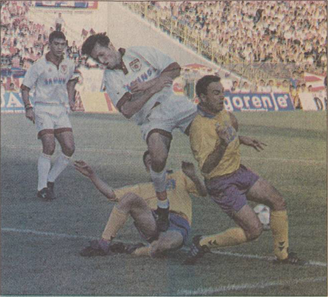
A challenge between Florin Constantinovici (Rapid) and Gheorghe Leahu (Petrolul) during the 1995 Romanian Cup final

A major milestone in the rivalry occurred in the final of the 1995 Cupa României, where Petrolul won their second Romanian Cup after defeating Rapid on penalties. The match proved controversial: Petrolul led through Claudiu Andreicuț before Rapid equalized via Iulian Chiriță, whose goal appeared to be offside. Although allegations of refereeing bias later circulated, these claims were never substantiated and remain part of supporter folklore.

=== Decline, bankruptcy and revival (2000s–present) ===
The early 2000s saw both clubs competing in the top division until Petrolul’s relegation at the end of the 2003–04 season. The decade represented one of the most successful periods in Rapid’s history, as the club won the 2002–03 league title, three Romanian Cups, three Romanian Supercups, and reached the quarter-finals of the 2005–06 UEFA Cup. During this period, encounters between the two clubs were largely dominated by Rapid.

Petrolul spent several seasons in the second division before returning to the top flight in 2010–11. The club enjoyed renewed success by winning the 2013 Romanian Cup. However, both teams soon encountered severe financial difficulties, culminating in declarations of bankruptcy in 2016, which temporarily halted the rivalry.

Both clubs were subsequently re-founded and began rebuilding. In October 2019, they met again in the second division, with Rapid winning 1–0. Rapid returned to Liga I in 2020–21, followed by Petrolul a year later, restoring the Primvs derby to the top tier of Romanian football.

== Honours ==
As of 6 February 2026

Petrolul Ploiești	Competition	Rapid București
Domestic
4	Liga I / Divizia A	3
9	Liga II / Divizia B	6
1	Liga III	1
1	Liga IV (regional)	1
—	Liga V (regional)	1
3	Cupa României	13
—	Supercupa României	4
—	Cupa Ligii	1
1	Cupa României (regional - Liga IV)	1
19	Domestic Total	31
International and regional (non-UEFA)
—	Balkans Cup (defunct)	2
—	European Railways Cup (defunct)	1
1	Bangladesh President's Gold Cup	—
1	Total	3
20	Grand total	34

Note: The Balkans Cup, the European Railways Cup and the Bangladesh President's Gold Cup were international tournaments not organized by UEFA, and therefore do not count towards official European records.

== Statistics ==
As of 21 August 2026

	Total matches played	Rapid wins	Draws	Petrolul wins	Rapid goals	Petrolul goals
Bucharest district championship	2	1	1	0	7	3
Divizia A	92	45	21	26	132	93
Liga I	15	5	7	3	12	8
Total (league)	109	51	29	29	151	104
Cupa României	13	9	1	3	36	16
Divizia B	8	3	0	5	9	13
Liga II	3	1	1	1	1	2
Total (official)	133	64	31	38	197	135

== Official match results ==
Dates are in dd/mm/yyyy form

- SF = Semi-finals
- QF = Quarter-finals
- R16 = Round of 16
- R32 = Round of 32
- GS = Group stage
- R1 = Round 1
- R2 = Round 2

=== As a cross-town rivalry (1931–1951) ===
Rapid win Draw Juventus win

Season	Competition	No.	Date	Home team	Score	Away team	Goals (home)	Goals (away)
1931–32	Southern League - Bucharest district championship	1	1 November 1931	Juventus	3–3	CFR	Melchior 18′; A. Bărbulescu ?′; Carianopol ?′	V. Chiroiu 30′, 38′; Gebrovsky 71′
1931–32	Southern League - Bucharest district championship	2	17 April 1932	CFR	4–0	Juventus	V. Chiroiu ?′; Baciu ?′; T. Chiroiu ?′; Gebrovsky ?′	—
1934–35	Divizia A	3	9 September 1934	CFR	2–1	Juventus	Geza Medve 11′; Țepeneag 35′	Zăinescu 2′
1934–35	Divizia A	4	25 May 1935	Juventus	3–4	CFR	Melchior 25′; Palmer ?′; Cossini 55′ (o.g.)	Brandabura 19′ (o.g.); Ströck III 23′; Șt. Barbu 46′; Gh. Georgescu 68′
1935–36	Divizia A	5	14 September 1935	Juventus	1–3	CFR	Korony 8′	Cuedan 30′; L. Pal 38′; Gh. Georgescu 55′
1935–36	Divizia A	6	14 March 1936	CFR	4–1	Juventus	Șt. Barbu 1′; Boros 43′; I. Moldoveanu 53′; L. Pal 69′	R. De Vittor 80′
1936–37	Divizia A	7	26 September 1936	Juventus	1–4	CFR	R. De Vittor 75′	I. Bogdan 10′, 85′; Lengheriu 30′; Auer 82′
1936–37	Divizia A	8	21 May 1937	Rapid	4–2	Juventus	I. Bogdan 7′, 37′; Auer 32′; Baratky 65′	Vaida 12′; Zăinescu 68′
1938–39	Divizia A	9	27 August 1938	Rapid	0–1	Juventus	—	Prassler 58′
1938–39	Divizia A	10	30 April 1939	Juventus	0–4	Rapid	—	Cossini 30′; Baratky 40′, 72′; I. Moldoveanu 57′
1939–40	Divizia A	11	3 December 1939	Juventus	2–2	Rapid	Prassler 62′, 89′ (pen.)	I. Bogdan 49′; Auer 63′ (pen.)
1939–40	Divizia A	12	6 June 1940	Rapid	4–1	Juventus	Baratky 7′; Auer 30′, 49′; I. Bogdan 46′	Drăgan 70′
1940–41	Cupa României QF	13	25 May 1941	Rapid	5–1	Juventus	Baratky 34′, 64′; I. Bogdan 50′, 70′; Ritter 57′	Naciu 90′
1942–43	Cupa României R16	14	16 May 1943	Rapid	4–0	Juventus	Florian Radu 41′, 53′, 71′, 88′	—
1946–47	Divizia A	15	8 December 1946	CFR	0–1	Juventus	—	Flamaropol 39′
1946–47	Divizia A	16	15 June 1947	Juventus	5–1	CFR	Titi Popescu 8′, 78′; E. Iordache 20′, 31′; Flamaropol 22′	Fl. Tănăsescu 70′
1947–48	Divizia A	17	4 September 1947	Juventus	3–2	CFR	Flamaropol 28′, 33′; E. Iordache 61′	I. Lungu 46′; Șt. Filotti 71′
1947–48	Divizia A	18	21 February 1948	CFR	2–0	Distribuţia Petrol	Șt. Filotti 41′; Fl. Tănăsescu 65′	—
1948–49	Divizia A	19	27 November 1948	CFR	1–1	Petrolul	I. Lungu 33′	Titi Popescu 63′
1948–49	Divizia A	20	2 July 1949	Petrolul	4–1	CFR	Oană 16′, 67′; Titi Popescu 23′, 24′	I. Lungu 70′
1950	Divizia A	21	23 April 1950	Locomotiva	1–0	Partizanul	Smărăndescu 2′	—
1950	Divizia A	22	14 October 1950	Partizanul	1–0	Locomotiva	V. Neagu 67′	—
1951	Divizia A	23	6 May 1951	Flacăra	0–2	Locomotiva	—	A. Rădulescu 33′; I. Nicșa 76′
1951	Divizia A	24	30 September 1951	Locomotiva	0–0	Flacăra	—	—

=== As an inter-city rivalry (1952–present) ===
Rapid win Draw Petrolul win

Season	Competition	No.	Date	Home team	Score	Away team	Goals (home)	Goals (away)
1952	Cupa României R16	25	1 October 1952	Locomotiva Grivița Roșie	1–3	Flacăra	Androvits 84′	E. Iordache 24′; Titi Popescu 53′; Fătu 74′
1954	Divizia A	26	16 May 1954	Flacăra	0–2	Locomotiva Grivița Roșie	—	I. Olaru 84′; D. Călin 87′
1954	Divizia A	27	24 October 1954	Locomotiva Grivița Roșie	3–0	Flacăra	Z. Pakay 5′; Șt. Filotti 51′; I. Csegezi 83′	—
1955	Cupa României R16	28	2 November 1955	Locomotiva	2–1	Flacăra	Șt. Filotti 65′; D. Călin 83′	Zaharia 88′
1956	Divizia A	29	29 April 1956	Flacăra	1–1	Locomotiva	Zaharia 60′	I. Olaru 31′
1956	Divizia A	30	23 September 1956	Locomotiva	1–2	Energia Flacăra	N. Georgescu 90′	A. Munteanu 30′; Bădulescu-Bardatz 58′
1956	Cupa României QF	31	25 November 1956	Locomotiva	3–1	Energia Flacăra	Șt. Filotti 57′; I. Olaru 100′, 104′	Tabarcea 12′
1957–58	Divizia A	32	6 October 1957	Locomotiva	0–0	Energia Flacăra	—	—
1957–58	Divizia A	33	18 May 1958	Petrolul	0–2	Rapid	—	Gh. Ene 13′; N. Georgescu 27′
1958–59	Divizia A	34	9 November 1958	Petrolul	3–1	Rapid	M. Dridea 4′, 58′; Zaharia 51′	V. Copil 70′
1958–59	Divizia A	35	24 May 1959	Rapid	0–0	Petrolul	—	—
1959–60	Divizia A	36	15 November 1959	Petrolul	1–1	Rapid	Tabarcea 88′	Ozon 37′ (pen.)
1959–60	Divizia A	37	12 June 1960	Rapid	1–1	Petrolul	Gh. Ene 25′	Zaharia 90′
1960–61	Divizia A	38	23 October 1960	Rapid	0–0	Petrolul	—	—
1960–61	Divizia A	39	7 May 1961	Petrolul	1–2	Rapid	M. Dridea 85′	Gh. Florea 49′ (o.g.); Ion C. Ion 65′
1960–61	Cupa României R16	40	30 August 1961	Rapid	3–1	Petrolul	I. Ionescu 13′, 25′; N. Georgescu 46′	Fl. Voinea 23′
1961–62	Divizia A	41	26 November 1961	Petrolul	3–1	Rapid	M. Dridea 1′, 34′ (pen.); V. Dridea 87′	V. Kraus 63′
1961–62	Divizia A	42	2 July 1962	Rapid	2–2	Petrolul	N. Georgescu 6′; I. Ionescu 8′	M. Dridea 22′, 47′
1962–63	Divizia A	43	26 August 1962	Petrolul	3–2	Rapid	Tabarcea 14′; D. Munteanu 58′; P. Mureșan 86′	Codreanu 49′; Ozon 88′
1962–63	Divizia A	44	24 March 1963	Rapid	6–1	Petrolul	N. Georgescu 15′; I. Ionescu 23′, 40′ (pen.); Dan Coe 72′; V. Kraus 80′, 88′	V. Anghel 27′ (pen.)
1963–64	Divizia A	45	22 September 1963	Rapid	0–6	Petrolul	—	C. Moldoveanu 7′, 61′, 68′; M. Dridea 58′, 80′, 82′
1963–64	Divizia A	46	12 April 1964	Petrolul	0–1	Rapid	—	C. Dinu 78′
1964–65	Divizia A	47	29 November 1964	Petrolul	0–1	Rapid	—	V. Kraus 31′
1964–65	Divizia A	48	11 April 1965	Rapid	1–0	Petrolul	I. Ionescu 67′ (pen.)	—
1965–66	Divizia A	49	29 August 1965	Rapid	2–1	Petrolul	E. Dumitriu 14′; I. Ionescu 63′	E. Frățilă 68′
1965–66	Divizia A	50	31 March 1966	Petrolul	1–0	Rapid	V. Dridea 52′	—
1965–66	Cupa României QF	51	22 June 1966	Rapid	2–0	Petrolul	I. Ionescu 42′; E. Dumitriu 56′	—
1966–67	Divizia A	52	19 February 1967	Rapid	3–1	Petrolul	Jamaischi 46′; I. Ionescu 49′; E. Dumitriu 78′	M. Mocanu 25′
1966–67	Divizia A	53	11 June 1967	Petrolul	0–0	Rapid	—	—
1967–68	Divizia A	54	22 October 1967	Petrolul	1–0	Rapid	M. Dridea 77′ (pen.)	—
1967–68	Divizia A	55	8 May 1968	Rapid	4–0	Petrolul	E. Dumitriu 21′, 41′, 45′, 58′	—
1968–69	Divizia A	56	11 August 1968	Rapid	0–0	Petrolul	—	—
1968–69	Divizia A	57	9 March 1969	Petrolul	0–2	Rapid	—	Dan Coe 15′; C. Dinu 88′ (pen.)
1969–70	Divizia A	58	3 December 1969	Rapid	1–0	Petrolul	Al. Neagu 79′	—
1969–70	Divizia A	59	15 March 1970	Petrolul	2-0	Rapid	T. Cotigă 28′; Dincuță 46′	—
1970–71	Divizia A	60	13 September 1970	Petrolul	0–0	Rapid	—	—
1970–71	Divizia A	61	27 March 1971	Rapid	1–0	Petrolul	Al. Neagu 36′	—
1971–72	Divizia A	62	5 September 1971	Rapid	2–0	Petrolul	D. Ene 47′; Al. Neagu 48′	—
1971–72	Divizia A	63	26 March 1972	Petrolul	1-0	Rapid	M. Moldovan 69′	—
1972–73	Divizia A	64	15 October 1972	Rapid	1–0	Petrolul	Al. Neagu 82′	—
1972–73	Divizia A	65	28 April 1973	Petrolul	1-0	Rapid	I. Constantin 85′	—
1973–74	Divizia A	66	28 October 1973	Petrolul	1–1	Rapid	V. Pârvu 55′	Năsturescu 7′
1973–74	Divizia A	67	12 May 1974	Rapid	2–0	Petrolul	N. Manea 48′, 88′	—
1978–79	Divizia B	68	10 December 1978	Rapid	0-1	Petrolul	—	Simaciu 39′
1978–79	Divizia B	69	24 June 1979	Petrolul	2-0	Rapid	N. Toporan 44′; State 51′	—
1979–80	Divizia B	70	2 September 1979	Rapid	1–0	Petrolul	F. Cojocaru 26′	—
1979–80	Divizia B	71	23 March 1980	Petrolul	3-0	Rapid	Simaciu 11′; R. Mureșan 73′; N. Toporan 90′	—
1980–81	Divizia B	72	2 November 1980	Petrolul	3-0	Rapid	Gălățeanu 1′; C. Pancu 14′; N. Toporan 42′	—
1980–81	Divizia B	73	24 May 1981	Rapid	3–2	Petrolul	Șt. Popa 7′; N. Manea 43′, 56′	I. Cojocaru 70′; Cismaru 88′
1981–82	Divizia B	74	1 November 1981	Petrolul	1-0	Rapid	I. Ștefănescu 78′	—
1981–82	Divizia B	75	23 May 1982	Rapid	5–1	Petrolul	N. Manea 4′, 84′; M. Damaschin 11′; I. Ion 40′; Șt. Popa 82′	Cosarek 18′
1983–84	Divizia A	76	3 September 1983	Petrolul	3-1	Rapid	Simaciu 10′; I. Toma 56′; Gălățeanu 90′	P. Petre 49′
1983–84	Divizia A	77	21 February 1984	Rapid	1–0	Petrolul	N. Manea 85′	—
1985–86	Divizia A	78	11 August 1985	Rapid	2–0	Petrolul	Bacoș 68′; Mladin 89′	—
1985–86	Divizia A	79	11 March 1986	Petrolul	2-0	Rapid	Nuță 27′; I. Gușă 53′	—
1986–87	Divizia A	80	28 September 1986	Petrolul	3-0	Rapid	C. Ene 32′; B. Mocanu 37′; C. Pancu 90′	—
1986–87	Divizia A	81	12 April 1987	Rapid	2–1	Petrolul	Țârban 58′ (pen.), 80′ (pen.)	Hâncu 68′
1987–88	Divizia A	82	6 September 1987	Rapid	0-1	Petrolul	—	Panait 85′
1987–88	Divizia A	83	19 March 1988	Petrolul	0–0	Rapid	—	—
1990–91	Divizia A	84	28 November 1990	Rapid	2–1	Petrolul	Constantinovici 24′; Drăgan 70′	Catinca 16′
1990–91	Divizia A	85	16 June 1991	Petrolul	1-0	Rapid	C. Lazăr 23′	—
1991–92	Divizia A	86	24 November 1991	Rapid	2–0	Petrolul	Gh. Dumitrașcu 19′, 57′	—
1991–92	Divizia A	87	24 May 1992	FC Ploieşti	0–0	Rapid	—	—
1992–93	Divizia A	88	16 August 1992	FC Ploieşti	1–1	Rapid	O. Grigore 15′	I. Chiriță 44′
1992–93	Divizia A	89	14 March 1993	Rapid	1–0	Petrolul	I. Chiriță 60′	—
1993–94	Divizia A	90	6 November 1993	Petrolul	1-0	Rapid	Zmoleanu 67′	—
1993–94	Divizia A	91	6 April 1994	Rapid	3–0	Petrolul	I. Chiriță 41′; Voinea 75′; Vlădoiu 85′	—
1994–95	Divizia A	92	7 December 1994	Rapid	0–0	Petrolul	—	—
1994–95	Divizia A	93	14 June 1995	Petrolul	2-0	Rapid	Pârlog 23′; O. Grigore 82′	—
1994–95	Cupa României	94	21 June 1995	Petrolul	1-1 (a.e.t.) (5-3 p)	Rapid	Andreicuț 82′	I. Chiriță 87′
1995–96	Divizia A	95	8 November 1995	Rapid	1–0	Petrolul	Constantinovici 40′	—
1995–96	Divizia A	96	13 April 1996	Petrolul	2-1	Rapid	O. Grigore 33′, 37′	O. Grigore 73′ (o.g.)
1996–97	Divizia A	97	26 October 1996	Rapid	0-1	Petrolul	—	Toader 7′
1996–97	Divizia A	98	3 May 1997	Petrolul	1–1	Rapid	O. Grigore 89′ (pen.)	Târțău 45′
1997–98	Divizia A	99	30 August 1997	Rapid	2–1	Petrolul	Butoiu 7′; Târțău 90′ (pen.)	Zmoleanu 23′
1997–98	Divizia A	100	7 March 1998	Petrolul	1–1	Rapid	Toader 21′	Iftodi 50′
1998–99	Divizia A	101	20 September 1998	Rapid	2–1	Petrolul	D. Pancu 16′; Șumudică 89′	Todoran 81′
1998–99	Divizia A	102	17 April 1999	Petrolul	2–2	Rapid	N. Constantin 31′; Onuț 44′	Nae Stanciu 53′; Ganea 67′
1999–00	Divizia A	103	18 September 1999	Rapid	2–0	Petrolul	Mutică 64′; Sg. Radu 77′	—
1999–00	Divizia A	104	1 April 2000	Petrolul	4-2	Rapid	O. Grigore 19′; Costescu 36′; Irimescu 41′; Pancovici 89′	Lupu 45′ (pen.); Schumacher 60′
2000–01	Divizia A	105	6 August 2000	Rapid	3–1	Petrolul	Măldărășanu 14′; Schumacher 55′; Frăsineanu 60′	Orlando 36′
2000–01	Divizia A	106	10 March 2001	Petrolul	1–2	Rapid	Pârvu 40′	C. Barbu 88′; Burke 90′
2001–02	Divizia A	107	3 November 2001	Rapid	4–1	Petrolul	Șumudică 55′, 58′; Raț 67′; Bogdanovic 81′	Irimescu 83′
2001–02	Divizia A	108	18 May 2002	Petrolul	0–2	Rapid	—	Ilyés 44′; R. Niță 75′
2003–04	Divizia A	109	2 November 2003	Rapid	2–0	Petrolul	S. Ilie 39′, 68′	—
2003–04	Divizia A	110	12 May 2004	Petrolul	0–2	Rapid	—	Ilyés 26′; I. Stancu 32′
2005–06	Cupa României SF	111	22 March 2006	Rapid	4–1	Petrolul	D. Pancu 37′; D. Niculae 65′; V. Moldovan 67′; Burdujan 73′	Hadnagy (38)
2005–06	Cupa României SF	112	26 April 2006	Petrolul	3–3	Rapid	Stepanovs 29′; Donets 42′; L. Marinescu 87′ (pen.)	D. Niculae 22′; M. Constantin 48′; D. Pancu 53′
2008–09	Cupa României R32	113	16 October 2008	Rapid	3–2	Petrolul	Đalović 6′; Césinha 80′, 118′	Muțiu 22′; Tincu 82′ (pen.)
2010–11	Cupa României R32	114	21 September 2010	Rapid	5–0	Petrolul	Sburlea 15′; Grigorie 17′; António 19′, 51′; Césinha 81′	—
2011–12	Liga I	115	13 August 2011	Petrolul	0–1	Rapid	—	D. Pancu 87′
2011–12	Liga I	116	11 March 2012	Rapid	2–0	Petrolul	A. Ioniță I 27′; Surdu 53′	—
2012–13	Liga I	117	18 August 2012	Petrolul	0–0	Rapid	—	—
2012–13	Liga I	118	9 March 2013	Rapid	0–0	Petrolul	—	—
2013–14	Cupa României R16	119	31 October 2013	Rapid	0–2	Petrolul	—	Doré 66′; Romário Pires 72′
2014–15	Liga I	120	16 August 2014	Petrolul	0–0	Rapid	—	—
2014–15	Liga I	121	13 March 2015	Rapid	1–1	Petrolul	Săpunaru 60′	Teixeira 64′
2019–20	Liga II	122	16 October 2019	Rapid	1–0	Petrolul	B. Manole 80′	—
2019–20	Liga II	123	11 July 2020	Petrolul	0–0	Rapid	—	—
2020–21	Liga II	124	6 November 2020	Petrolul	2–0	Rapid	Buhăescu 7′; Botic 90+1′	—
2022–23	Liga I	125	13 August 2022	Petrolul	1–0	Rapid	Grozav 23′	—
2022–23	Liga I	126	14 December 2022	Rapid	3–1	Petrolul	Dugandžić 9′ (pen.), 73′; Pănoiu 90+4′	Grozav 61′
2023–24	Liga I	127	13 August 2023	Rapid	0–2	Petrolul	—	Oaidă 62′ (o.g.); Borja Valle 90+5′ (o.g.)
2023–24	Liga I	128	15 December 2023	Petrolul	0–0	Rapid	—	—
2024–25	Liga I	129	29 July 2024	Petrolul	1–0	Rapid	Berisha 31′	—
2024–25	Liga I	130	30 November 2024	Rapid	1–1	Petrolul	Dumitriu 54′ (o.g.)	Tudorie 62′
2025–26	Liga I	131	27 September 2025	Petrolul	0–1	Rapid	—	Pașcanu 24′
2025–26	Liga I	132	6 February 2025	Rapid	1-1	Petrolul	Pașcanu 75′	Papp 72′
2026–27	Liga I	133	21 August 2026	Petrolul	0-2	Rapid	—	A. Dobre 55′; Moruțan 90'
2026–27	Liga I	134	16 January 2027	Rapid	TBD	Petrolul		

=== Top scorers ===
As of 21 August 2026

Below is the list of players with the most goals scored in official games.

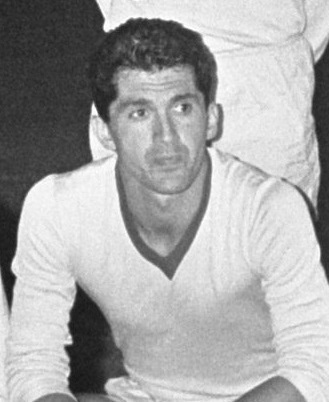
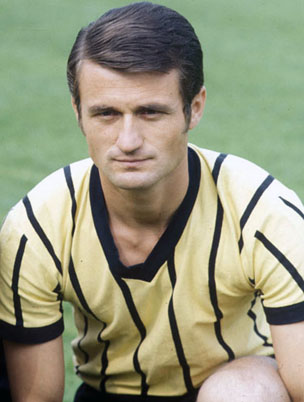
Mircea Dridea, the top scorer of the Primvs derby (11), and Puiu Ionescu, the highest scorer of the Railwaymen (9)

Rank	Player	Team(s) (goals)	Goals
1	(Romania) Mircea Dridea	Petrolul	11
2	(Romania) Ion Ionescu	Rapid	9
3	(Romania) Ionică Bogdan	Rapid	8
4	(Romania) Emil Dumitriu II	Rapid	7
4	(Romania) Nicolae Manea	Rapid	7
5	(Romania) Constantin "Titi" Popescu	Petrolul	6
5	(Romania) Octavian Grigore	Petrolul	6
6	(Hungary) (Romania) Iuliu Baratky	Rapid	5
6	(Hungary) (Romania) Ștefan Auer	Rapid	5
6	(Romania) Nicolae Georgescu	Rapid	5

== Head-to-head ranking in Liga I ==
P.	33	34	35	36	37	38	39	40	41	47	48	49	50	51	52	53	54	55	56	58	59	60	61	62	63	64	65	66	67	68	69	70	71	72	73	74	75	76	77	78	79	80	81	82	83	84	85	86	87	88	89	90	91	92	93	94	95	96	97	98	99	00	01	02	03	04	05	06	07	08	09	10	11	12	13	14	15	16	17	18	19	20	21	22	23	24	25	26
1																				1	1							1	1																																1				1																							
2	2				2	2		2	2			2	2					2						2		2	2	2				2	2																											2		2						2																				
3				3							3											3	3								3																											3						3		3	3			3					3	3												
4		4								4	4								4		4																															4			4	4	4						4						4				4	4														
5							5			5						5			5					5		5				5																										5																													5		5	5
6																							6				6																															6																			6									6		
7				7	7												7								7								7																				7	7																		7																
8																				8					8																							8	8										8		8										8				8										8			
9																													9	9																		9											9				9																					9			9	
10			10											10								10												10																				10			10																															
11												11		11	11																				11												11						11									11																								11		
12																	12																												12																																											12
13																															13	13			13											13				13																																						
14																																		14				14											14											14														14				14										
15																																																																15		15																						
16																																				16			16																16																						16											
17																																								17						17				17	17																																					
18																																				18																																																				
Liga II
1	1								1						1	1		1																			1		1					1	1		1				1	1													1								1					1						1				
2																																										2	2	2																																2							2					
3																																						3				3	3																									3	3	3		3																
4																																								4																											4				4										4							
5																																					5																																													5						
6																																									6																																									6						
9																																																																																			9					
Liga III
1																																																																																1	1							
Liga IV
1																																																																															1	1								
Liga V
1																																																																															1									

Juventus București/Petrolul Ploiești
Rapid București

== Sources ==
- Frățilă, Răzvan (2013a). Petrolul Ploiești, Istorie și tradiție. Volumul 1 - Începuturile. Ploiești: Karta-Graphic.
- Frățilă, Răzvan (2013b). Petrolul Ploiești, Istorie și tradiție. Volumul 2 - Gloria. Ploiești: Karta-Graphic.
- Ionescu, Romeo (2019a). Petrolul Ploiești – Formațiile din meciurile oficiale de fotbal 1972–2019. Ploiești: Self-published.
- Ionescu, Romeo (2019b). Rapid București – Formațiile din meciurile oficiale de fotbal. Ploiești: Self-published.
