= 1995 Cupa României final =

- Event: 1994–95 Cupa României
Petrolul Ploieşti	Rapid București
Divizia A	Divizia A
1	1
- Petrolul won 5–3 on penalties
- Date: 21 June 1995
- Venue: Stadionul Naţional, Bucharest
- Referee: Ion Crăciunescu (Romania)
- Attendance: 30,000

The 1995 Cupa României final was the 57th final of Romania's most prestigious cup competition. The final was played at the Stadionul Naţional in Bucharest on 21 June 1995 and was contested between Divizia A sides Petrolul Ploieşti and Rapid București. The cup was won by Petrolul on penalties.

== Route to the final ==
FC Petrolul Ploieşti

Round of 32	Minerul Mătăsari	0–2	Petrolul Ploieşti
Round of 16	Petrolul Ploieşti	2–0	Oţelul Târgovişte
Quarter-finals	Petrolul Ploieşti	2–1	UTA Arad
Semi-finals 1st Leg	Universitatea CLuj	0–0	Petrolul Ploieşti
Semi-finals 2nd Leg	Petrolul Ploieşti	3–0	Universitatea CLuj

FC Rapid București

Round of 32	ASA Târgu Mureş	1–2	Rapid București
Round of 16	Rapid București	4–1	Steaua București
Quarter-finals	Rapid București	4–1	Maramureş Baia Mare
Semi-finals 1st Leg	Rapid București	2–0	Universitatea Craiova
Semi-finals 2nd Leg	Universitatea Craiova	0–1	Rapid București

== Match details ==
21 June 1995
19:00 EEST

Petrolul Ploieşti	1–1 (a.e.t.)	Rapid București
Andreicuţ 82'	Report	Chiriţă 87'
Penalties
Zmoleanu (penalty scored); Grigore (penalty scored); Grama (penalty scored); Andreicuţ (penalty scored); Răchită (penalty scored)	5–3	(penalty scored) Lupu; (penalty scored) Chiriţă; (penalty scored) Vlădoiu; (penalty missed) Frunză

Stadionul Naţional, Bucharest
Attendance: 30,000
Referee: Ion Crăciunescu (Romania)

Petrolul Ploieşti	Rapid București

PETROLUL PLOIEŞTI:
GK	1	(Romania) Ştefan Preda
DF	2	(Romania) Daniel Chiriţă	(substituted off) 41'
DF	5	(Romania) Octavian Grigore
DF	6	(Romania) Valeriu Răchită (c)
DF	4	(Romania) Gheorghe Bălăceanu
MF	3	(Romania) Gheorghe Leahu
MF	7	(Romania) Marian Grama
MF	11	(Romania) Mihai Pârlog
MF	8	(Romania) Marcel Abăluță
FW	10	(Romania) Cristian Zmoleanu
FW	9	(Romania) Daniel Zafiris	(substituted off) 67'
Substitutes:
MF	15	(Romania) Eugen Baștină	(substituted on) 41'
MF	14	(Romania) Claudiu Andreicuţ	(substituted on) 67'
Manager:
(Romania) Marin Ion

RAPID BUCUREŞTI:
GK	1	(Romania) Leontin Toader
MF	2	(Romania) Cezar Zamfir
DF	3	(Romania) Georgică Vameșu	(substituted off) 77'
DF	4	(Romania) Adrian Matei
DF	5	(Romania) Romulus Bealcu
MF	6	(Romania) Florin Constantinovici
DF	7	(Romania) Tiberiu Curt
MF	8	(Romania) Ionel Chebac	(substituted off) 58'
FW	9	(Romania) Ion Vlădoiu
FW	10	(Romania) Iulian Chiriţă
MF	11	(Romania) Dănuţ Lupu
Substitutes:
DF	15	(Romania) Dorel Mutică	(substituted on) 58'
MF	16	(Romania) Florin Frunză	(substituted on) 77'
Manager:
(Romania) Sorin Cârţu

MATCH OFFICIALS

- Assistant referees:
  - (Romania) Zoltan Erdei
  - (Romania) Nicolae Grigorescu
- Fourth official:

MAN OF THE MATCH

MATCH RULES

- 90 minutes.
- 30 minutes extra-time (15 minute intervals)
- Penalty shoot-out if scores level after extra time.
- Seven named substitutes
- Maximum of 3 substitutions.
