= ACS Urban Titu =

Association football club in Romania

Urban Titu
- Full name: Clubul Sportiv Urban Titu
- Nicknames: Titenii (The people from Titu)
- Founded: 1972
- Ground: Orășenesc
- Capacity: 1.100
- Owner: Titu Municipality
- Chairman: Andrei Ivașcu
- Head coach: Adrian Bogoi
- League: Liga III
- 2025–26: Liga III, Seria IV, 10th
Home colours	Away colours

Clubul Sportiv Urban Titu, commonly known as Urban Titu, is a Romanian football club based in Titu, Dâmbovița County, currently playing in Liga III, the tier of Romanian football. The team plays its home matches at the Orășenesc Stadium, which is currently under reconstruction.

== History ==
Electrosid Titu was promoted to Divizia C at the end of the 2002–03 season, after winning the Divizia D championship in Dâmbovița County, thus returning to the third tier of Romanian football after an eleven-year absence.

In Divizia C, Electrosid competed in Series IV, finishing 6th in the 2003–04 season and 9th in 2004–05, then 4th in 2005–06. After moving to Series III, the team ranked 12th in the 2006–07 campaign, followed by 4th place in 2007–08 and 8th in 2008–09. Electrosid finished 4th in the 2009–10 campaign and also managed to reach the Fifth Round of the Cupa României, defeating AFC Filipeștii de Pădure (3–0), Gaz Metan Finta (3–1), FCM Târgoviște (2–2, 7–6 after penalty shoot-out) and FC Argeș (1–0), before being eliminated by Dunărea Giurgiu with a 1–2 loss. In the 2010–11 season, Electrosid ranked 5th.

In the summer of 2011, the club was taken over by the Titu City Hall, changing its name from Electrosid to Urban Titu. The team competed in Series III, finishing 5th in the 2011–12 season, followed by 7th place in Series II in 2012–13, then 8th after the regular season and the play-out round of Series VI in 2013–14.

In 2014, head coach Nicolae Croitoru left after twelve years at the club and was replaced by Adrian Neaga., who was subsequently succeeded in February by Cristian Bădoiu, leading the team to a 9th-place finish in Series III in 2014–15. Gheorghe Becheanu took over in 2015, guiding the team to 13th place in 2015–16, before being replaced by Silviu Dumitrescu in the spring of 2017, who oversaw a 14th-place finish in 2016–17, resulting in relegation.

Urban was spared from relegation and appointed Mihai Dinu as the new head coach for the 2017–18 season, but in the fall of 2017, the team withdrew from Liga III after the owners reacted to match-fixing involving the betting mafia, and continued its activity the following season in Liga V – Dâmbovița County, the fifth tier of Romanian football league system and the second at county level, and secured promotion to Liga IV – Dâmbovița County by winning the West Series.

The 2019–20 season was suspended in March 2020 due to the COVID-19 pandemic, with Urban sitting in 5th place. In the 2021–22 season, the first full season post-pandemic, Urban finished 8th. Laurențiu Cristea was appointed head coach for the 2022–23 campaign but left the team in March 2023, with Ciprian Dicu replacing him as player-coach and leading Urban to a 3rd-place finish.

In the 2023–24 season, Florin Anton took charge but was dismissed after nineteen rounds and replaced by Marian Vătavu, under whose leadership Urban Titu earned promotion to Liga III by winning the county title and the promotion play-off against Metropolitan Ișalnița, the Dolj County winner, with a double 3–0 victory. Urban also won the Cupa României – Dâmbovița County phase after a 3–0 win against Recolta Gura Șuții. The squad included, among others, Curiman, Dicu, Toader, Logofătu, Vlad, Vasilescu, Bucur, Vîrtej, Verdeș, C. Șerban, Manda, Istrate, Stoica, Răuță, Sima, Moțoi, Tudorache, A. Ilie, Lițoiu, and Manole.

Following the promotion, Marius Rotaru was appointed as the new head coach and guided Urban to a 4th-place finish after the regular season and play-out stages of Series V in the 2024–25 campaign.

== Honours ==
Liga IV – Dâmbovița County

- Winners (5): 1974–75, 1976–77, 1981–82, 2002–03, 2023–24

Cupa României – Dâmbovița County

- Winners (1): 2023–24

== Former managers ==
- (Romania) Nicolae Croitoru (2002–2014)
- (Romania) Adrian Neaga (2014)
- (Romania) Cristian Bădoiu (2015)
- (Romania) Gheorghe Becheanu (2015–2017)
- (Romania) Silviu Dumitrescu (2017)
- (Romania) Mihai Dinu (2017)
- (Romania) Laurențiu Cristea (2022–2023)
- (Romania) Ciprian Dicu (2023)
- (Romania) Florin Anton (2023–2024)
- (Romania) Marian Vătavu (2024)
- (Romania) Marius Rotaru (2024–2025)
- (Romania) Cristian Bădoiu (2026)
- (Romania) Adrian Bogoi (2026–present)
