= Ștefan Preda =

Romanian footballer

Personal information
- Full name: Ștefan Gabriel Preda
- Date of birth: 18 June 1970 (age 56)
- Place of birth: Ploiești, Romania
- Height: 1.87 m (6 ft 2 in)
- Position: Goalkeeper

Team information
- Current team: Romania (GK coach)

Youth career
- Minerul Filipești

Senior career*
Years	Team	Apps	(Gls)
1992	Minerul Filipești		
1993–1997	Petrolul Ploiești	154	(0)
1998–2001	Dinamo București	61	(0)
2000	→ Astra Ploiești (loan)	8	(0)
2001–2002	Universitatea Craiova	26	(0)
2002–2004	Dinamo București	18	(0)
2003	→ Argeș Pitești (loan)	15	(0)
2003–2004	→ Poiana Câmpina (loan)	3	(0)
2004–2005	Argeș Pitești	8	(0)
2006	Unirea Urziceni	8	(0)
2006–2007	Chimia Brazi	10	(0)
Total		311	(0)

International career
1994–1995	Romania	3	(0)

Managerial career
- 2006–2007: Chimia Brazi
- 2008–2009: Chimia Brazi
- 2014–2015: Steaua București (GK coach)
- 2016–2021: Viitorul Constanța (GK coach)
- 2021–2025: Farul Constanța (GK coach)
- 2025–2026: Farul Constanța U18 (GK coach)
- 2026: Farul Constanța (GK coach)
- 2026–: Romania (GK coach)
- * Club domestic league appearances and goals

Ștefan Gabriel Preda (born 18 June 1970) is a former Romanian professional footballer who played as a goalkeeper, currently goalkeeping coach at the Romania national team.

== Club career ==
Preda was born on 18 June 1970 in Ploiești, Romania and began playing football in 1992 at Minerul Filipești in Divizia C. Shortly afterwards he joined Petrolul Ploiești where he made his Divizia A debut on 13 June 1993 under coach Marin Ion in a 3–1 home win over Farul Constanța. He helped the club win the 1994–95 Cupa României, playing the entire match under coach Ion in the penalty shoot-out victory against Rapid București in the final. He started the next season by playing in the 2–0 loss to Steaua București in the 1995 Supercupa României. Subsequently, he made four appearances in the 1995–96 Cup Winners' Cup campaign as The Yellow Wolves got past Wrexham in the qualifying round, being eliminated by Rapid Wien in the following one.

In the middle of the 1997–98 season, Preda left Petrolul to join Dinamo București. He helped his new club win The Double in the 1999–2000 season, playing 30 league games under coach Cornel Dinu, and he kept a clean sheet in the 2–0 victory against Universitatea Craiova in the Cupa României final. He then played in both legs of the 7–4 aggregate loss to Polonia Warsaw in the 2000–01 Champions League second qualifying round. In the same season he won another Cupa României, but coach Dinu used Florin Prunea in the 4–2 victory in the final against Rocar București.

For the second half of the 2000–01 season, Preda went to play for Astra Ploiești. In 2001 he signed with Universitatea Craiova. In 2002 when Craiova owner Gheorghe Nețoiu left the team to go to Dinamo, he took players Preda, Cosmin Bărcăuan, Dan Alexa, Flavius Stoican, Ovidiu Burcă, Ciprian Danciu, Cornel Frăsineanu and Ștefan Grigorie with him. In the 2002–03 season he played in the first half for Dinamo and in the second for Argeș Pitești. In the following season, Preda helped The Red Dogs win another Double, being used by coach Ioan Andone in 11 league matches. He also helped the club get past Shakhtar Donetsk in the 2003–04 UEFA Cup, being eliminated in the following round by Spartak Moscow. In the same season he made three appearances in the second league for Dinamo's satellite team Poiana Câmpina.

Afterwards, he returned to Argeș Pitești, where on 1 October 2005 he made his last Divizia A appearance in a 2–0 away loss to Farul Constanța, totalling 290 matches in the competition and 11 games in European competitions. Preda spent the last years of his career playing for Unirea Urziceni and Chimia Brazi in Divizia B.

== International career ==
Preda played three friendly games for Romania, making his debut on 1 June 1994 when coach Anghel Iordănescu sent him in the 79th minute to replace Florin Prunea in a 0–0 draw against Slovenia. His following two games took place in February 1995, the results being a 1–0 loss to Greece and a 1–1 draw against Turkey.

He was selected by Iordănescu to be part of the squad that went to the 1994 World Cup final tournament, but he did not play in any games. For representing his country at that final tournament, Preda was decorated by then President of Romania, Traian Băsescu on 25 March 2008, with the Ordinul "Meritul Sportiv" – (The Medal of "Sportive Merit") Class III.

=== International stats ===
Romania
Year	Apps	Goals
1994	1	0
1995	2	0
Total	3	0

== Managerial career ==
Preda started his managerial career in 2006, as head coach at Liga II team Chimia Brazi, a position he held until 2007. He returned to Chimia in 2008, remaining there until 2009.

Since 2014, Preda has worked as a goalkeeper coach at teams such as Steaua București, Viitorul Constanța and Farul Constanța.

== Personal life ==
In 1994, Preda was named Honorary Citizen of Bucharest.

== Honours ==
Petrolul Ploiești

- Cupa României: 1994–95
- Supercupa României runner-up: 1995

Dinamo București

- Divizia A: 1999–2000, 2003–04
- Cupa României: 1999–00, 2000–01, 2003–04
