= Gheorghe Leahu =

Romanian footballer

Personal information
- Full name: Gheorghe Aurelian Leahu
- Date of birth: 30 September 1968 (age 58)
- Place of birth: Fieni, Romania
- Height: 1.82 m (6 ft 0 in)
- Positions: Left back; central defender; defensive midfielder

Youth career
- 1981–1990: Cimentul Fieni

Senior career*
| Years | Team | Apps | (Gls) |
| 1990–1992 | Flacăra Moreni | | |
| 1992 | Argeș Pitești | 0 | (0) |
| 1993–1997 | Petrolul Ploiești | 136 | (1) |
| 1998–1999 | Gloria Bistrița | 30 | (0) |
| 1999–2000 | Midia Năvodari | 29 | (0) |
| 2000–2001 | Astra Ploiești | 20 | (0) |
| Total | | 215 | (1) |

International career
| 1993 | Romania B | 1 | (0) |
- * Club domestic league appearances and goals

Gheorghe Aurelian Leahu (born 30 September 1968) is a Romanian former footballer who played as a defender and midfielder.

== Club career ==
Leahu, nicknamed Cuchi, was born on 30 September 1968 in Fieni, Romania and began playing junior-level football in 1981 at local club Cimentul. In 1990 he started his senior career at Divizia B team Flacăra Moreni. In 1992 he went to play for first league side, Argeș Pitești but did not make any league appearances.

In the middle of the season he went to Petrolul Ploiești, where he made his Divizia A debut on 14 March 1993 under coach Marin Ion in a 1–0 away loss to Rapid București. Leahu helped the club win the 1994–95 Cupa României, with coach Ion using him the entire match in the penalty shoot-out victory against Rapid in the final. He started the next season by playing in the 2–0 loss to Steaua București in the 1995 Supercupa României. Then he made four appearances in the 1995–96 Cup Winners' Cup campaign as The Yellow Wolves got past Wrexham in the qualifying round, being eliminated by Rapid Wien in the following one.

In the middle of the 1997–98 season, Leahu left Petrolul to join Gloria Bistrița who paid $5,000 for his transfer. In 1999 he went to play one season in Divizia B for Midia Năvodari. Afterwards, Leahu returned to first league football at Astra Ploiești where until 2001 he made his last Divizia A appearances, totaling 186 matches with one goal netted in the competition.

== International career ==
Leahu made one appearance for Romania's B squad, playing in a 3–2 loss to Moldova.

== Honours ==
Petrolul Ploiești

- Cupa României: 1994–95
- Supercupa României runner-up: 1995
