= Silviu Dumitrescu =

Romanian footballer and manager

Personal information
- Date of birth: 4 February 1953 (age 73)
- Place of birth: Târgoviște, Romania
- Position: Defender

Youth career
- CS Târgoviște

Senior career*
Years	Team	Apps	(Gls)
1971–1988	CS Târgoviște	150	
1988–1990	ICIM Brașov		
Total		150	

Managerial career
- 1992–1994: Cimentul Fieni
- 1994–1997: Chindia Târgoviște
- 1997–1998: Argeș Pitești
- 1998–1999: Rocar București
- 2000: Midia Năvodari
- 2000–2001: Gaz Metan Mediaș
- 2004–2005: FCM Târgoviște
- 2006: Apolonia Fier
- 2007: Besa Kavajë
- 2011: Chindia Târgoviște
- 2012: Chindia Târgoviște (technical director)
- 2012: Chindia Târgoviște (caretaker)
- 2012–2013: Chindia Târgoviște (technical director)
- 2013–2014: Chindia Târgoviște
- 2017: Urban Titu
- * Club domestic league appearances and goals

Silviu Dumitrescu (born 4 February 1953) is a Romanian football manager and former player.

== Playing career ==
Dumitrescu played in the Divizia A in over 150 matches for CS Târgoviște, being one of the members of the so called "golden generation" of the club along with players such as: Nicolae Dobrin, Ion Ene, Florea Alexandru, Ionel Pitaru, Dumitru Gheorghe, Claudius Sava, Nelu Isaia, Gheorghe Greaca, Florin Grigore, Nicolae Enache, Petre Marinescu, Ion Constantin, Ilie Niculescu, Viorel Radu, Constantin Miia, Gheorghe Voinea, Mihai Iatan, Mihai Banu, Mihai Mărgelatu, Gheorghe Filipescu and Dumitru Economu. This generation achieved two promotions in the top tier and the best performance in the history of the football from Târgoviște (7th place).

== Managerial career ==
As a football manager Dumitrescu started his career in 1992 at Cimentul Fieni and after two good seasons he was appointed by Chindia Târgoviște. At Chindia, together with his assistants, Vasile Silaghi and Gheorghe Păsărică, he created one of the best squads that ever played on Eugen Popescu Stadium. Even if probably this team was not as good as Dumitrescu's generation, the promotion achieved in 1996, after 12 years of lower divisions, the style of playing and the composition of the squad, made of local players, won the heart of the supporters and gave to the club a nickname that will last for years, "Micul Ajax" (The Little Ajax). In that Chindia squad were players such as: Adrian Bogoi, Vasile Bârdeș, Bogdan Liță, Cristian Țermure, Cristian Bălașa, Remus Gâlmencea or Laurențiu Reghecampf.

Dumitrescu left Târgoviște in 1997, but his career would reach the peak in the late 1990s and early 2000s. Firstly he obtained a qualification in the UEFA Cup with FC Argeș Pitești, then two promotions in the Divizia A with Rocar București (1999) and Gaz Metan Mediaș (2001). In 2006 after a season spent at Târgoviște, Dumitrescu moved to Albania where he had two short spells at Apolonia Fier and Besa Kavajë.

In 2011 he returned to Chindia, firstly as a manager, then as a technical director and again as a manager.

== Honours ==
=== Player ===
CS Târgoviște

- Divizia B: 1976–77, 1980–81

=== Manager ===
Chindia Târgoviște

- Divizia B: 1995–96
- Divizia C: 1994–95

Rocar București

- Divizia B: 1998–99

Gaz Metan Mediaș

- Divizia B: 2000–01
