= Cristian Bălașa =

Romanian association football player

Personal information
- Date of birth: 27 December 1972 (age 53)
- Place of birth: Pucioasa, Romania
- Height: 1.71 m (5 ft 7 in)
- Position: Midfielder

Team information
- Current team: Pucioasa (team manager)

Senior career*
Years	Team	Apps	(Gls)
1995–1997	Chindia Târgoviște	69	(10)
1998–2003	Argeș Pitești	162	(18)
2003–2004	Farul Constanța	24	(2)
2004	FC Oradea	13	(1)
2005–2006	FCM Târgoviște	25	(2)
2006–2010	Concordia Chiajna	53	(1)
2018	Aninoasa		
Total		346	(34)

Managerial career
- 2012: AS Doiceşti
- 2012–2013: Concordia II Chiajna
- 2013–2015: Viitorul Constanța (assistant)
- 2015–2016: Chindia Târgoviște (sporting director)
- 2016–2019: Aninoasa
- 2019–2024: Concordia Chiajna (sporting director)
- 2024: Concordia Chiajna (assistant)
- 2024: Gloria Buzău (president)
- 2024–2025: Chindia Târgoviște (team manager)
- 2025–: Pucioasa (team manager)
- * Club domestic league appearances and goals

Cristian Bălașa (born 27 December 1972) is a Romanian professional football manager and former player, currently team manager at Liga III club Pucioasa.

== Club career ==
Bălașa made his Divizia A debut on 31 July 1996, for Chindia Târgoviște, in a 1–0 win against Ceahlăul Piatra Neamț. He also played for Argeș Pitești, Farul Constanța, FC Oradea and Concordia Chiajna before retiring in 2010.

In February 2018, Bălașa decided to play again for the team that he also managed, FC Aninoasa.

== Managerial career ==
In 2012, Bălașa started his coaching career, managing lower league clubs such as AS Doiceşti, Concordia II Chiajna and Aninoasa, and was also Gheorghe Hagi's assistant coach at Viitorul Constanța for two seasons. From 2015 to 2016 he was the sporting director of Chindia Târgoviște.

== Personal life ==
His son, Mihai Bălașa, is also a football player.

== Honours ==
=== Player ===
Chindia Târgoviște

- Divizia B: 1995–96

Concordia Chiajna

- Liga III: 2006–07
