= Fieni =

- Town
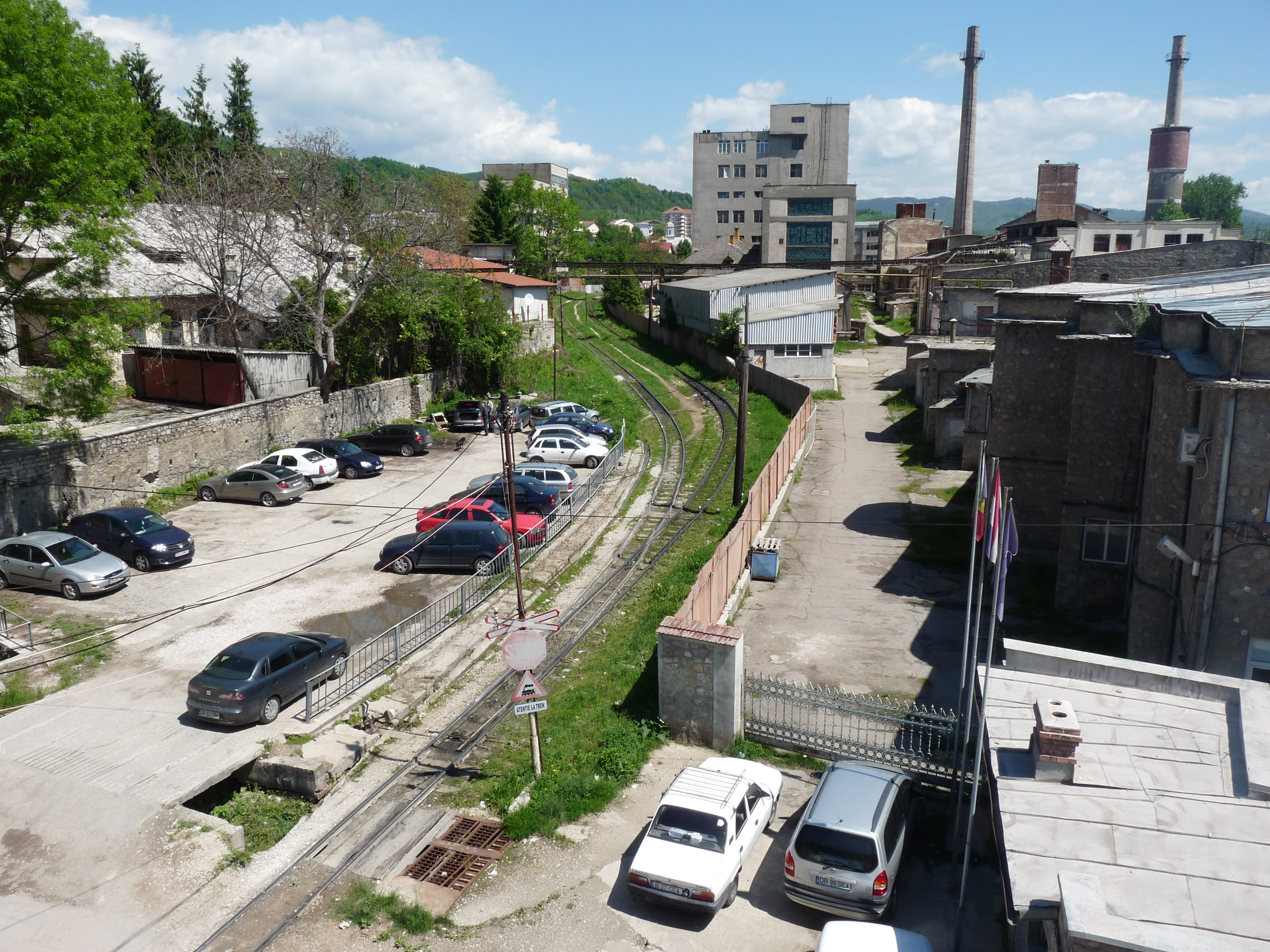

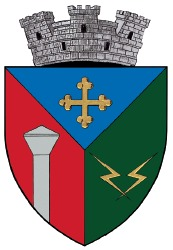
- Coat of arms

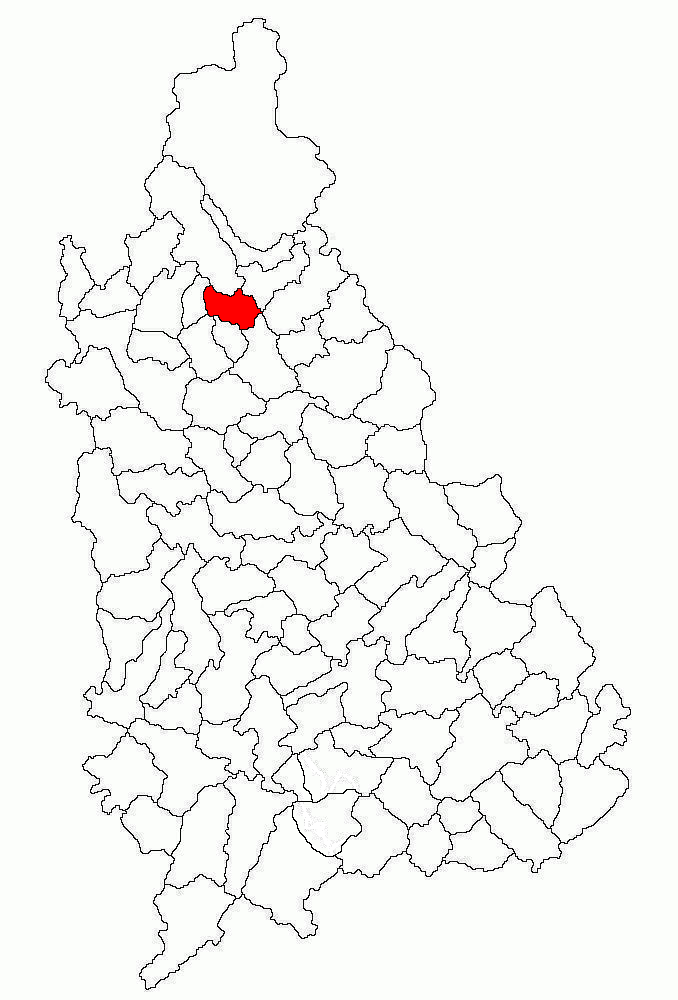
- Location in Dâmbovița County

- Location in Romania
- Coordinates: 45°7′20″N 25°25′6″E
- Country: Romania
- County: Dâmbovița

Government
  - Mayor (2024–2028): Iulian Tătulescu (PSD)
- Area: 28.52 km^{2} (11.01 sq mi)
- Elevation: 460 m (1,510 ft)
- Population (2021-12-01): 6,378
  - Density: 223.6/km^{2} (579.2/sq mi)
- Time zone: UTC+02:00 (EET)
  - Summer (DST): UTC+03:00 (EEST)
- Postal code: 135100
- Vehicle reg.: DB
- Website: www.fieni.ro

Fieni is a town in Dâmbovița County, Muntenia, Romania, on the Ialomița River, having a population of 6,378 as of 2021. It administers two villages, Berevoești and Costești.

The town is situated in a hilly area south of the Bucegi Mountains, on the banks of the Ialomița River. It is located 29 km (18 mi) north of the county seat, Târgoviște, and is crossed by national road DN71, which starts close to Bucharest, runs through Târgoviște, and ends in Sinaia, 35 km (22 mi) north of Fieni.

The St. Nicholas Church of Fieni, built in 1804, is a historical monument. A cement factory in Fieni was bought in 2002 by the German company HeidelbergCement. The local football team, Cimentul Fieni, was founded in 1936 and played in Divizia C, before being dissolved in 2005. The home ground of the team was Stadionul Cimentul.

== Natives ==
- Aryeh Finkel (1931–2016), rabbi
- Olga Homeghi (born 1958), rower
- Gheorghe Leahu (born 1968), footballer
