= Ionel Chebac =

Romanian footballer

Personal information
- Date of birth: 30 September 1967 (age 59)
- Place of birth: Galați, Romania
- Height: 1.85 m (6 ft 1 in)
- Position: Defensive midfielder

Youth career
- Dunărea CSU Galați
- DVA Portul Galați
- Pandurii Târgu Jiu

Senior career*
Years	Team	Apps	(Gls)
1988–1993	Oțelul Galați (Note: The statistics for the 1989–90 Divizia B season are unavailable.)	79	(3)
1993–1996	Rapid București	83	(7)
1997	FC Brașov	3	(0)
1997–1998	FC Onești	3	(0)
1998–1999	Dunărea Galați	7	(0)
Total		175	(10)
- * Club domestic league appearances and goals

Ionel Chebac (born 30 September 1967) is a Romanian former footballer who played as a midfielder. His son, Alexandru Chebac was also a footballer.

== Honours ==
Oțelul Galați

- Divizia B: 1990–91

Rapid București

- Cupa României runner-up: 1994–95
