= KSV Roeselare =

Belgian football club

Roeselare
- Full name: Koninklijke Sport; Vereniging Roeselare
- Founded: 20 July 1921; 104 years ago (creation); 1 July 1999; 26 years ago (merge and registration)
- Dissolved: 2020; 6 years ago
- Ground: Schiervelde Stadion, Roeselare
- Capacity: 9,490
- Owner: Dai Yongge
- Chairman: Yves Olivier
- Manager: Christophe Gamel
- League: Belgian First Division B
- 2018–19: Belgian First Division B, 6th
Home colours	Away colours

Koninklijke Sport Vereniging Roeselare, abbreviated to KSV Roeselare (Dutch pronunciation: [ˌkaːʔɛsfeː ˈrusəˌlaːrə]), also known in French as KSV Roulers, was a Belgian football club from the city of Roeselare in West Flanders. Its matricule was 134. It last played at the highest level of Belgian football from 2005–06 until 2009–10, but finally folded in 2020 after having relegated to the third level and going bankrupt.

== History ==
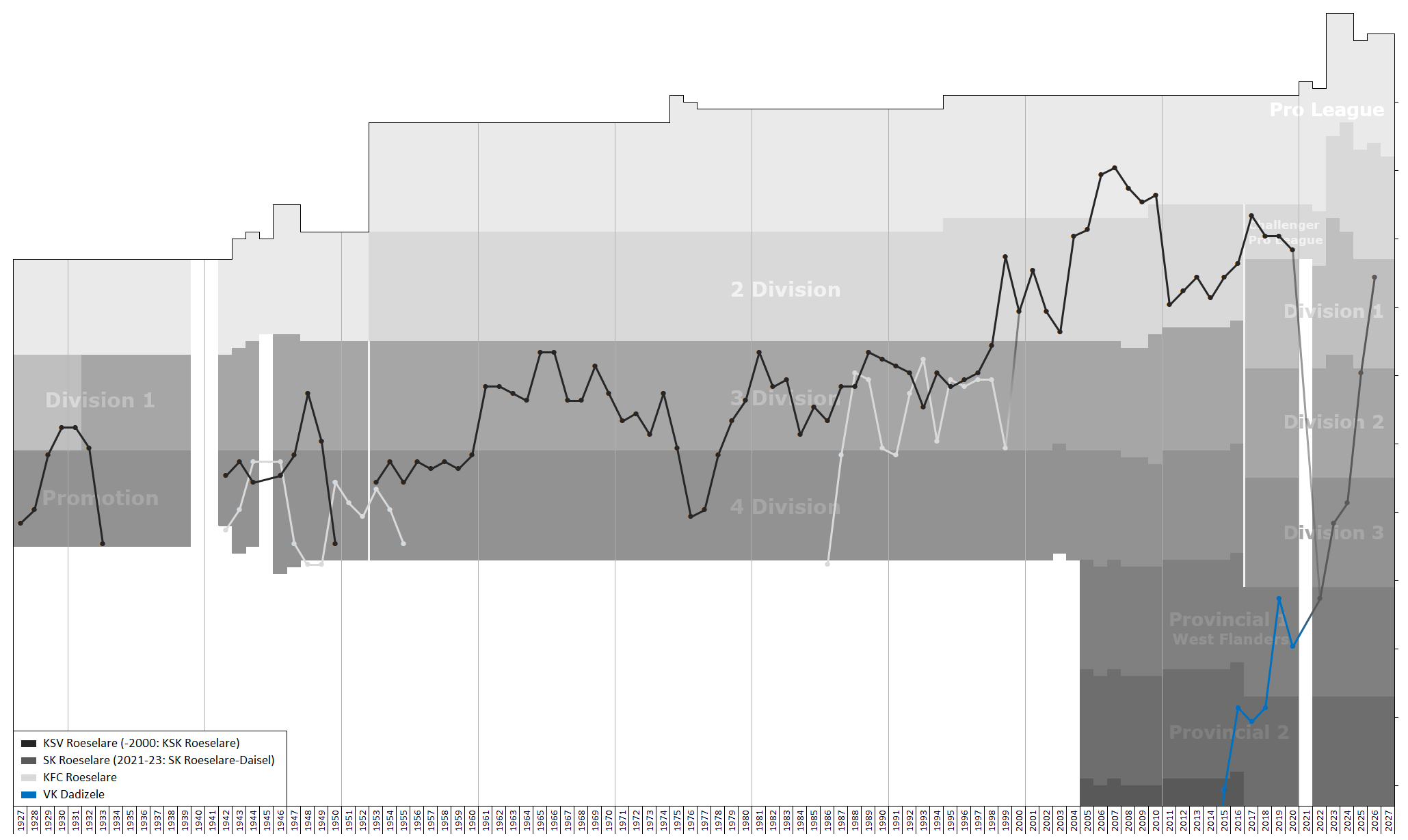
Historical chart of Roeselare league performance

The first club of the city was founded in 1900 by some students and named De Verenigde Vrienden (Dutch for The United Friends) but that name changed early to Red Star Roeselare. In 1902, the club is known as Union Sportive Roulers (in French) but it will retire from the football association for financial problems in 1909. The next year, two new clubs are founded – Sportvereniging Roeselare (the Catholics) and F.C. Roeselare (the non-Catholics) – but not for long as the former club activity stopped in 1914 due to World War I. The birth of S.K. Roeselare arose seven years later. it received the matricule n° 134. F.C. Roeselare with the matricule n° 286. However, this matricule does not exist anymore as K.S.K. Roeselare and K.F.C. Roeselare merged in 1999 to form K.S.V. and kept the n° 134. The first time a team from Roeselare achieved promotion to the first division was in 2005 when K.S.V. won the second division playoff.

== Honours ==
- Belgian Second Division:
  - Runners-up (1): 2004–05
- Belgian Second Division final round:
  - Winners (1): 2005
- Belgian First Division B
  - Runners-up (1): 2016–17

== European record ==
As of December, 2008.

Competition	Appearances	Matches played	Wins	Draws	Losses	Goals for	Goals against
UEFA Cup	1	4	3	0	1	9	8

Uefa Cup 2006 – 2007

- 1st qualifier:
  - FK Vardar Skopje – KSV Roeselare 1 – 2
  - KSV Roeselare – FK Vardar Skopje 5 – 1
- 2nd qualifier:
  - KSV Roeselare – FC Ethnikos Achnas 2 – 1
  - FC Ethnikos Achnas – KSV Roeselare 5 – 0

== Former players ==
- (Australia) Nikita Rukavytsya
- (Croatia) Ivan Perišić
- (Iceland) Hólmar Örn Eyjólfsson
- (Morocco) Abdessalam Benjelloun
- (Nigeria) Ode Thompson
- (Tunisia) Sami Allagui
- (Romania) Florin Frunză
