= Poiana, Dâmbovița =

Poiana
- Commune
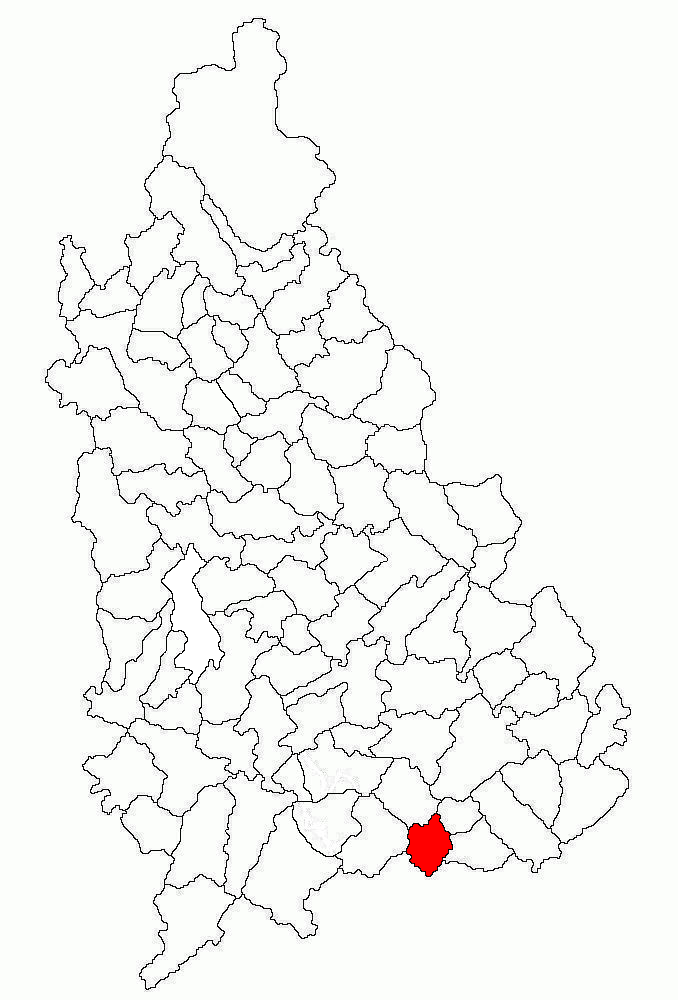
- Location in Dâmbovița County

- Location in Romania
- Coordinates: 44°34′N 25°41′E
- Country: Romania
- County: Dâmbovița

Government
  - Mayor (2024–2028): Marian Șerban (PSD)
- Area: 27.06 km^{2} (10.45 sq mi)
- Elevation: 127 m (417 ft)
- Population (2021-12-01): 3,495
  - Density: 130/km^{2} (330/sq mi)
- Time zone: EET/EEST (UTC+2/+3)
- Postal code: 137365
- Area code: +(40) 245
- Vehicle reg.: DB
- Website: primariapoianadb.ro

Poiana is a commune in Dâmbovița County, Muntenia, Romania with a population of 3,495 people as of 2021. It is composed of two villages, Poiana and Poienița.

Historical population
Year	Pop.	±%
2002	3,960	—
2011	3,739	−5.6%
2021	3,495	−6.5%
Source: Census data

== Natives ==
- Georgică Vameșu (born 1968), footballer
