= 1961 Cupa României final =

- Event: 1960–61 Cupa României
Arieșul Turda	Rapid București
2	1
- Date: 12 November 1961
- Venue: Republicii, Bucharest
- Referee: Nicolae Mihăilescu (Bucharest)
- Attendance: 25,000

The 1961 Cupa României final was the 23rd final of Romania's most prestigious football cup competition. It was disputed between Arieșul Turda and Rapid București, and was won by Arieșul Turda after a game with 3 goals. It was the first cup for Arieșul Turda.

Arieșul Turda become the second club representing Divizia B which won the Romanian Cup final, after Metalul Reșița which accomplished this in 1954.

== Match details ==
12 November 1961
14:30 EET

Arieșul Turda	2–1	Rapid București
Băluţiu 50' (pen.), 51'	Report	Georgescu 24'

Republicii, Bucharest
Attendance: 25,000
Referee: Nicolae Mihăilescu (Bucharest)

GK	1	(Romania) Vasile Suciu
DF	2	(Romania) Eugen Pantea
DF	3	(Romania) Ioachim Zăhan
MF	4	(Romania) Alexandru Vădan
MF	5	(Romania) Eugen Luparu
MF	6	(Romania) Ion Onacă
FW	7	(Romania) Vasile Mărgineanu
FW	8	(Romania) Vasile Pârvu
FW	9	(Romania) Dionisie Ursu (c)
FW	10	(Romania) Gheorghe Băluţiu
FW	11	(Romania) Liviu Husar
Manager:
(Romania) Ştefan Wetzer

GK	1	(Romania) Gheorghe Dungu
DF	2	(Romania) Ilie Greavu
DF	3	(Romania) Ion Motroc
MF	4	(Romania) Dumitru Macri (red card) 88'
MF	5	(Romania) Ion Langa
MF	6	(Romania) Constantin Koszka
FW	7	(Romania) Viorel Kraus
FW	8	(Romania) Andor Balint
FW	9	(Romania) Titus Ozon
FW	10	(Romania) Nicolae Georgescu
FW	11	(Romania) Marin Dulgheru (substituted off) 75'
Substitutions:
FW	12	(Romania) Gheorghe Văcaru (substituted in) 75'
Manager:
(Romania) Ion Mihăilescu

== See also ==
- List of Cupa României finals
