= Stadionul Central (Fieni) =

Stadium in Romania

- Interactive map of Stadionul Central
- Former names: Stadionul Cimentul (1977–2005)
- Address: Str. Târgului, nr. 22
- Location: Fieni, Romania
- Coordinates: 45°07′46.2″N 25°24′21.1″E
- Owner: Town of Fieni
- Operator: CSM Fieni
- Capacity: 5,000 seated
- Surface: Grass

Construction
- Opened: 25 June 1977

Tenant
- CSM Fieni (1977–present)

Stadionul Central is a multi-purpose stadium in Fieni, Romania. It is currently used mostly for football matches and is the home ground of CSM Fieni. The stadium was opened on 25 June 1977, as part of a modern Sports Complex built by the local Cement Factory, that consisted of a football stadium with concrete stands and a capacity of approximately 5,000 seats, Olympic-sized swimming pool, tennis court, volleyball court, athletics track and sand pits for long and high jumps, six lane running track, floodlights.
