= 1964–65 Divizia A =

47th season of top-tier football league in Romania

Divizia A
- Season: 1964–65
- Champions: Dinamo București
- Relegated: Minerul Baia Mare; Progresul București
- European Cup: Dinamo București
- Cup Winners' Cup: Știința Cluj
- Inter-Cities Fairs Cup: Steagul Roşu Brașov
- Matches: 182
- Goals: 448 (2.46 per match)
- Top goalscorer: Mihai Adam (18)
- Biggest home win: Dinamo 10–1 Brașov
- Biggest away win: Craiova 0–4 Steaua
- Highest scoring: Dinamo 10–1 Brașov
- Longest winning run: Dinamo (6)
- Longest unbeaten run: Rapid (14)
- Longest winless run: Progresul (8)
- Longest losing run: Progresul, Craiova (4)

The 1964–65 Divizia A was the forty-seventh season of Divizia A, the top-level football league of Romania.

== Teams ==
Location of teams in 1964-65 Divizia A

== League table ==
Pos	Team	Pld	W	D	L	GF	GA	GD	Pts	Qualification or relegation
1	Dinamo București (C)	26	17	4	5	56	22	+34	38	Qualification to European Cup preliminary round
2	Rapid București	26	15	7	4	34	17	+17	37	
3	Steaua București	26	12	7	7	38	25	+13	31	
4	Steagul Roşu Brașov	26	12	4	10	32	30	+2	28	Invitation to Inter-Cities Fairs Cup second round
5	UTA Arad	26	9	8	9	32	43	−11	26	
6	Petrolul Ploiești	26	10	5	11	32	25	+7	25	
7	Știința Cluj	26	9	6	11	40	38	+2	24	Qualification to Cup Winners' Cup first round
8	Dinamo Pitești	26	9	6	11	34	34	0	24	
9	Crişul Oradea	26	7	9	10	22	27	−5	23	
10	CSMS Iași	26	8	7	11	26	35	−9	23	
11	Ştiinţa Craiova	26	9	4	13	31	40	−9	22	
12	Farul Constanța	26	8	6	12	21	36	−15	22	
13	Minerul Baia Mare (R)	26	9	3	14	27	45	−18	21	Relegation to Divizia B
14	Progresul București (R)	26	6	8	12	23	31	−8	20	Relegation to Divizia B

Source: LT
Rules for classification: 1) points; 2) goal average; 3) number of goals scored
(C) Champions; (R) Relegated

=== Results ===
Home \ Away	IAȘ	CRI	DIN	PIT	FAR	BAI	PET	PRO	RAP	SRB	STE	UTA	ŞCR	ȘCJ
CSMS Iași	—	1–1	0–1	2–0	1–1	0–0	0–0	2–0	0–0	1–0	2–2	4–0	3–0	2–0
Crişul Oradea	1–0	—	0–0	1–1	1–0	3–0	1–0	1–0	1–1	2–0	2–3	1–1	0–1	1–1
Dinamo București	2–0	2–0	—	2–0	4–1	4–2	3–1	4–0	3–1	10–1	2–1	1–1	3–1	1–2
Dinamo Pitești	3–1	2–0	1–1	—	4–0	2–0	1–1	2–1	0–2	2–1	1–2	2–1	4–1	4–1
Farul Constanța	1–0	0–1	0–3	3–1	—	2–2	1–0	0–1	0–0	1–2	1–1	1–1	1–0	2–1
Minerul Baia Mare	1–2	1–0	0–1	2–0	2–0	—	2–0	3–1	0–1	1–0	2–1	2–2	1–0	2–1
Petrolul Ploiești	3–0	2–1	3–1	2–1	3–0	2–0	—	1–0	0–1	1–0	1–2	5–1	0–0	2–2
Progresul București	5–0	2–0	0–0	0–0	2–0	2–0	2–4	—	0–0	1–1	0–1	1–1	0–3	2–2
Rapid București	4–1	2–1	1–0	1–0	2–1	4–0	1–0	1–1	—	1–0	0–0	0–0	4–1	2–0
Steagul Roşu Brașov	1–0	1–1	3–1	4–1	0–1	2–0	2–1	1–0	4–1	—	1–0	3–0	3–1	2–1
Steaua București	1–1	0–0	0–1	2–0	0–0	3–1	1–0	1–2	0–1	1–0	—	4–0	2–0	3–1
UTA Arad	3–0	1–1	0–3	0–0	0–2	4–2	1–0	1–0	3–0	1–0	5–2	—	3–1	2–1
Ştiinţa Craiova	4–0	3–1	0–2	2–2	1–2	1–0	0–0	2–0	1–0	0–0	0–4	4–0	—	4–0
Știința Cluj	1–3	2–0	3–1	1–0	3–0	7–1	1–0	0–0	0–3	0–0	1–1	3–0	5–0	—

Source: LT
Legend: Blue = home team win; Yellow = draw; Red = away team win.
For upcoming matches, an "a" indicates there is an article about the rivalry between the two participants.

== Positions by round ==
Team ╲ Round	1	2	3	4	5	6	7	8	9	10	11	12	13	14	15	16	17	18	19	20	21	22	23	24	25	26
CSMS Iași	11	9	7	1	1	1	5	2	4	1	1	1	1	4	6	5	6	10	7	8	9	11	11	10	10	10
Crişul Oradea	14	13	13	10	10	5	6	7	7	4	8	7	8	10	11	8	10	8	10	7	8	10	9	9	8	9
Dinamo București	6	3	5	6	7	10	11	11	11	11	13	11	12	1	1	1	2	2	2	2	2	2	2	2	1	1
Dinamo Pitești	9	12	10	12	12	3	3	4	5	9	4	4	7	9	10	12	9	7	9	11	7	8	8	8	9	8
Farul Constanța	3	8	6	7	4	6	4	1	3	5	5	8	5	11	8	10	7	11	11	9	10	12	12	11	12	12
Minerul Baia Mare	5	7	9	11	11	7	8	9	9	10	11	13	13	14	13	13	14	12	13	12	13	14	14	14	11	13
Petrolul Ploiești	7	5	2	3	3	4	2	5	2	3	3	3	3	8	5	7	5	6	5	5	5	5	6	5	5	6
Progresul București	10	11	12	14	14	14	14	14	13	13	14	14	14	13	14	14	13	14	12	13	14	13	13	13	13	14
Rapid București	1	2	4	5	6	9	10	12	12	14	10	9	4	3	3	2	1	1	1	1	1	1	1	1	2	2
Steagul Roşu Brașov	4	6	8	8	8	11	7	6	8	8	9	12	10	5	4	4	4	3	4	4	4	4	4	4	4	4
Steaua București	2	1	3	4	5	8	9	10	10	7	2	2	2	2	2	3	3	4	3	3	3	3	3	3	3	3
UTA Arad	12	14	14	13	13	12	12	8	6	6	6	5	6	7	7	6	8	5	8	6	6	6	5	6	6	5
Ştiinţa Craiova	13	10	11	9	9	13	13	13	14	12	12	10	9	12	12	9	11	13	14	14	12	9	10	12	14	11
Știința Cluj	8	4	1	2	2	2	1	3	1	2	7	6	11	6	9	11	12	9	6	10	11	7	7	7	7	7

Source: LT (in Romanian)

== Top goalscorers ==
Rank	Player	Club	Goals
1	Mihai Adam	Știința Cluj	18
2	Constantin Sfârlogea	Știința Craiova	16
3	Gheorghe Ene	Dinamo București	15
4	Nicolae Nagy	Dinamo Piteşti	14
5	Mircea Dridea	Petrolul Ploiești	13

== Champion squad ==
Dinamo București

Goalkeepers: Ilie Datcu (24 / 0); Iuliu Uțu (6 / 0).
Defenders: Cornel Popa (25 / 0); Ion Nunweiller (25 / 0); Lică Nunweiller (13 / 2); Constantin Ștefan (22 / 0); Dumitru Ivan (19 / 0).
Midfielders: Emil Petru (19 / 4); Octavian Popescu (19 / 4); Vasile Gergely (20 / 0).
Forwards: Ion Pîrcălab (20 / 7); Radu Nunweiller (18 / 1); Constantin Frățilă (23 / 11); Gheorghe Ene (23 / 15); Ion Haidu (23 / 10); Gheorghe Grozea (4 / 0); Iosif Varga (2 / 0); Ion Țîrcovnicu (1 / 0); Vasile Ionescu (1 / 0); Mircea Lucescu (1 / 0).
(league appearances and goals listed in brackets)

Manager: Angelo Niculescu.

== See also ==
- 1964–65 Divizia B
- 1964–65 Divizia C
- 1964–65 Regional Championship
- 1964–65 Cupa României
