= Adrian Toader =

Romanian footballer

Personal information
- Full name: Adrian Orlin Toader
- Date of birth: 27 July 1973 (age 53)
- Place of birth: Ploiești, Romania
- Position: Forward

Youth career
- 1987–1991: Petrolul Ploiești

Senior career*
Years	Team	Apps	(Gls)
1991–1995	Petrolul Ploiești	96	(14)
1996	Lausanne-Sport	1	(0)
1996–1998	Petrolul Ploiești	36	(8)
1998	FC Universitatea Craiova	11	(3)
1999	Qingdao Beilaite		
1999	Petrolul Ploiești	2	(0)
2000	FCM Câmpina	24	(11)
2001	Gaz Metan Mediaș	3	(0)
2003	Apulum Alba Iulia	1	(0)
2004	FCM Câmpina	9	(1)
2004–2005	Politehnica Timișoara		
Total		183	(37)
- * Club domestic league appearances and goals

Adrian Orlin Toader (born 27 July 1973) is a retired Romanian football striker.

Since retirement Toader has worked as a youth coach for his home club Petrolul Ploiesti, and has also spun off his own academy, along with his brother Cristian, also a former footballer, which has since become an official feeder team for Petrolul Ploiesti.

== Honours ==
Petrolul Ploiești

- Cupa României: 1994–95
