= CSM Fieni =

Association football club

- Full name: Club Sportiv Muntenia Fieni
- Nicknames: Fienezii (The People from Fieni); Cimentul (The Cement) Betoniștii (The Concrete Workers)
- Short name: Fieni
- Founded: 1949; 77 years ago as Cimentul Fieni; 1969; 57 years ago as Cimentul Fieni; 2005; 21 years ago as Atletic Fieni; 2017; 9 years ago as CSM Fieni
- Ground: Central
- Capacity: 5,000
- Chairman: Răzvan Marinoiu
- Manager: Florian Cernea
- League: Liga IV
- 2025–26: Liga IV, Dâmbovița County, 9th
Home colours	Away colours

Club Sportiv Muntenia Fieni, commonly known as CSM Fieni, or simply as Fieni, is a Romanian football club based in Fieni, Dâmbovița County, which competes in the Liga IV. The original club was founded on 20 September 1949, under the name of Cimentul Fieni and played in the Romanian football league system until 2005, when the club sold its league place to CS Buftea, then was dissolved, due to financial problems.

The football team was re-founded in the same year, under the name of Atletic Fieni and in 2011, after some years of struggle, promoted back in the national divisions, but due to the same financial problems the club chose not to enroll in division. After some years spent at the level of the Liga IV, Atletic Fieni was re-organized once again, now under the name of CSM Fieni, in 2017.

During the communist period, Cimentul was an important third-tier club, then in the 1990s reached its peak, promoting to Divzia B and playing a top-flight promotion play-off, in 2002, but lost in front of Sportul Studențesc. The constancy of the team, during three decades (1970s, 1980s and 1990s) it was given by the local Cement Factory (ROMCIF), one of the most important in Romania.

== History ==
=== Establishment and first decades (1949–1973) ===
Football was brought to Fieni as early as 1929 by a group of enthusiasts, consisting of young officials and children of the owners of the Cement Factory who played on the communal farm meadow, called "Tamaslic Meadow". Here they laid the foundation of the first football team, baptized from the beginning Cimentul Fieni, name under it played until 2005. The establishment of the sports association Cimentul Fieni took place on 20 September 1949. During the 1950s and 1960s, Cimentul was looking for its place on the Romanian football map. In 1952 reached the Regional Championship, but relegated back in 1953, just to promote once again in 1954. Between 1954 and 1968, Cimentul was a constant presence in the Regional Championship, then in 1968 merged with the other local team, Electrica Fieni, which it was already a Divizia C member and that result in the form of another club, Viitorul Fieni. Cimentul was re-founded after just one year, in 1969, and the colours of the club were decided to be "white and blue".

=== The glory years (1973–2002) ===
In 1973, Cimentul Fieni promoted in the third division, with Ion Teodoroiu as chairman and Gheorghe Lăzărescu as manager. Fienezii will play at this level for the next 25 years, being a constant presence and a respected team in Romanian football. During the late 1970s and in the 1980s the Cimentul had important results, especially in the Romanian Cup and brought to Fieni important clubs, such as: Dinamo București, Sportul Studențesc, FC Argeș Pitești or Universitatea Craiova.

After the 1989 Romanian revolution, the Cement Factory was privatized under the name of ROMCIF SA, but unlike other communist enterprise-related teams, Cimentul survived and their results were better and better. At the end of the 1997–98 season, Cimentul succeeds to much-desired Divizia B promotion and also made a great debut season, ending on the 3rd place. Cimentul had a 2001–02 difficult season and relegated, but would keep its place in the second division by buying the place of Metrom Brașov (the early 2000s was a period when in the Romanian football the league places could be traded). Fienezii will fight in the next season for Divizia A promotion and ended the season in the 2nd place. The draw for the promotion play-offs was not on their side, as they would meet Sportul Studențesc, a team in vogue at that time, with players such as: Ionuț Mazilu, Laurențiu Diniță, Tiberiu Bălan, Costin Lazăr, George Galamaz or Gigel Bucur, among others. Cimentul lost 0–3 in front of "the students", who were managed at the time by another important name of the Romanian football, former international, Ioan Andone.

=== Recent years (2002–present) ===
In the following seasons, the team would lose important players and the results became more and more modest culminating in financial problems, a sold place (to CS Buftea) and an expected dissolution. The football team was re-founded in the same year, under the name of Atletic Fieni and in 2011, after some years of struggle, promoted back in the national divisions, but due to the same financial problems the club chose not to enroll in division.This was the team of Fieni that won the 2011 promotion play-offs to Liga III: Sfârlează – Cernea, M. Cernea, Dumitrescu, Fl. Iosif, Banu, Badea, Voica, Fl. Cernea, Leotescu, Stăncescu. Substitutions: Chivăreanu, Florescu, Săvulescu, Tudorache, B Nicolae, Albulescu, Blas. Manager: Florin Tudose.

After some years spent at the level of the Liga IV, Atletic Fieni was re-organized once again, now under the name of CSM Fieni, in 2017.

== Honours ==
Liga III

- Winners (2): 1991–92, 1997–98
- Runners-up (1): 1996–97

Liga IV – Dâmbovița County

- Winners (2): 1972–73
- Runners-up (1): 1971–72

== Former managers ==
- (Romania) Dumitru Nicolae (1952)
- (Romania) Ion Diaconescu (1954)
- (Romania) Ion Udroiu (1968–1969)
- (Romania) Gheorghe Lăzărescu (1973)
- (Romania) Ionel Popescu (1976)
- (Romania) Silviu Dumitrescu (1992–1994)
- (Romania) Marin Olteanu (1994–1995)
- (Romania) Nicolae Proca (1995–1996)
- (Romania) Viorel Turcu (1996–1997)
- (Romania) Stelian Badea (2000–2001)
- (Romania) Mihai Zamfir (2001)
- (Romania) Virgil Dridea (2001–2002)
- (Romania) Petre Gigiu (2002–2003)
- (Romania) Mario Marinică (2003–2004) (caretaker)
- (Romania) Iulian Chiriță
