= Gheorghe Petrescu =

Romanian footballer

Personal information
- Date of birth: 28 February 1919
- Place of birth: Bucharest, Romania
- Date of death: 26 May 1983 (aged 64)
- Position: Defender

Senior career*
Years	Team	Apps	(Gls)
1935–1944	Unirea Tricolor București (Note: The 1940–41 Divizia A was the last season before World War II and the 1946–47 Divizia A was the first one after, so the appearances during this period for Unirea Tricolor București are not official.)	58	(3)
1945–1952	Flacăra Ploiești	160	(0)
Total		218	(3)

International career
1948	Romania	2	(0)

Managerial career
- 1952–1956: Petrolul Ploiești
- 1956–1960: Flacăra Moreni
- 1960–1963: Metalul București
- 1963–1966: Poiana Câmpina
- 1966–1968: Metalul București
- 1968–1973: Metalul Târgoviște
- 1974–: Metalul București
- * Club domestic league appearances and goals as of 2 October 2024

Gheorghe Petrescu (28 February 1919 – 26 May 1983) was a Romanian football defender. He played 23 from a total of 24 matches of the 1940–41 season, in which Unirea Tricolor won the championship.

== International career ==
Gheorghe Petrescu played two games for Romania, making his debut under coach Iuliu Baratky at the 1948 Balkan Cup in a 3–2 victory against Bulgaria. His second game was also at the 1948 Balkan Cup, playing in a 2–1 victory against Czechoslovakia.

== Honours ==
Unirea Tricolor București

- Divizia A: 1940–41
- Divizia B: 1938–39
- Cupa României runner-up: 1935–36, 1940–41
