= Iulian Chiriță =

Romanian footballer

Personal information
- Date of birth: 2 February 1967 (age 59)
- Place of birth: Târgoviște, Romania
- Height: 1.82 m (6 ft 0 in)
- Position: Central midfielder

Youth career
- –1985: CSȘ Târgoviște

Senior career*
Years	Team	Apps	(Gls)
1985–1987	CS Târgoviște		
1988–1990	Flacăra Moreni	48	(4)
1990–1991	FC Brașov	44	(4)
1992–1996	Rapid București	132	(40)
1996	FC Brașov	6	(1)
1997	Dinamo București	23	(6)
1998	Argeș Pitești	9	(2)
1998–1999	Chindia Târgoviște	10	(3)
Total		272	(60)

International career
1994	Romania	3	(0)

Managerial career
- Cimentul Fieni
- * Club domestic league appearances and goals

Iulian Chiriță (born 2 February 1967) is a former Romanian professional footballer who played as a central midfielder.

== Club career ==
Chiriță was born on 2 February 1967 in Târgoviște, Romania and began playing junior-level football at CSȘ Târgoviște. He started to play senior level football in 1985 at CS Târgoviște in Divizia B. He made his Divizia A debut, playing for Flacăra Moreni on 18 March 1988 under coach Ion Nunweiller in a 2–0 away loss to Universitatea Craiova. During his time spent at Flacăra, he made his debut in European competitions, playing in both legs of the 4–1 loss on aggregate against Porto in the 1989–90 UEFA Cup. In 1998, he went to play for one and a half years at FC Brașov. Afterwards he joined Rapid București where he experienced the most successful period of his career, playing 132 Divizia A matches in which he scored 40 goals and served for a while as the team's captain. Chiriță also netted a goal in the 1995 Cupa României final, as coach Sorin Cârțu used him the entire match in the loss to Petrolul Ploiești. He appeared in 12 games in which he scored three goals in the UEFA Cup for The Railwaymen, most notably netting a goal against Charleroi which helped the club eliminate the Belgians in the first round of the 1994–95 edition. After his spell with Rapid ended, Chiriță returned for a short while to FC Brașov. Subsequently, he moved to Dinamo București, then to Argeș Pitești, ending his career in the 1998–99 Divizia B season at Chindia Târgoviște. He has a total of 262 Divizia A matches in which he scored 57 goals and 15 games with three goals in the UEFA Cup. After he ended his playing career, Chiriță worked for a short while as a manager at Cimentul Fieni, deciding afterwards that it was not a job he liked.

== International career ==
Chiriță played three friendly matches for Romania, making his debut on 20 April 1994 under coach Anghel Iordănescu in a 3–0 victory against Bolivia. His following two games were a 2–0 win over Nigeria and a 0–0 draw against Slovenia. Chiriță was also part of Romania's squad in the 1994 World Cup where the team reached the quarter-finals, but he did not play in any games in the campaign.

=== International stats ===
Romania
Year	Apps	Goals
1994	3	0
Total	3	0

== Personal life ==
In 1994, Chiriță was named Honorary Citizen of Bucharest.

== Conviction ==
Chiriță in the 1990s was in the entourage of Romanian thugs Fane Spoitoru and Gigi Boeru. After he scored a hat-trick for Rapid against Steaua București in a 4–1 victory in the 1994–95 Cupa României, Spoitoru and Boeru bought him a Dacia car as a gift. While he was living in Barcelona, Spain, where he owned a restaurant in Castelldefels, Chiriță was sent to jail in October 2015, receiving a sentence of two years and nine months for being part of a credit card theft mafia network. After serving one year and nine months, he was released from jail and claimed he was wrongfully convicted.

== Honours ==
Rapid București

- Cupa României runner-up: 1994–95
