= Georgică Vameșu =

Romanian footballer

Personal information
- Date of birth: 3 November 1968 (age 57)
- Place of birth: Poiana, Romania
- Height: 1.85 m (6 ft 1 in)
- Position: Central defender

Senior career*
Years	Team	Apps	(Gls)
1986–1987	Electrica Titu		
1987–1997	Rapid București	228	(10)
1997–1999	Molenbeek	33	(2)
1999–2003	Verbroedering Geel	91	(8)
2003–2007	Dessel Sport	97	(13)
2006–2007	→ Racing Mol-Wezel (loan)	10	(0)
2007–2008	Racing Mol-Wezel	17	(0)
2008–2010	Oosterzonen	38	(5)
Total		514	(38)
- * Club domestic league appearances and goals

Georgică Vameșu (born 3 November 1968) is a Romanian former professional footballer who played as a central defender.

== Honours ==
Rapid București

- Divizia B: 1989–90
- Cupa României runner-up: 1994–95
