= 1995–96 Divizia B =

Romanian second division football league season

Divizia B
- Season: 1995–96
- Promoted: Oțelul Târgoviște; Jiul Petroșani
- Relegated: FC Caracal; Bihor Oradea; Portul Constanța; FC Râmnicu Vâlcea
- Top goalscorer: Giani Gorga (16 goals)

The 1995–96 Divizia B was the 56th season of the second tier of the Romanian football league system.

The format has been maintained to two series, each of them having 18 teams. At the end of the season, the winners of the series promoted to Divizia A and the last two places from both series relegated to Divizia C.

== Team changes ==
=== To Divizia B ===
Promoted from Divizia C

- Foresta Fălticeni
- Oțelul Târgoviște
- Minerul Motru
- Minaur Zlatna
- FC Onești
- Dunărea Călărași
- ARO Câmpulung
- Olimpia Satu Mare

Relegated from Divizia A

- Electroputere Craiova
- Maramureș Baia Mare
- UTA Arad

=== From Divizia B ===
Relegated to Divizia C

- Flacăra Moreni
- ICIM Brașov
- Faur București
- CFR Cluj
- Acord Focșani
- Phoenix Baia Mare
- Callatis Mangalia
- Armătura Zalău

Promoted to Divizia A

- Selena Bacău
- Politehnica Timișoara
- Politehnica Iași

=== Renamed teams ===
Constant Galați was renamed as Dunărea Galați.

Jiul IELIF Craiova was moved from Craiova to Caracal and renamed as FC Caracal.

== League tables ==
=== Serie I ===
Pos	Team	Pld	W	D	L	GF	GA	GD	Pts	Promotion or relegation
1	Oțelul Târgoviște (C, P)	34	20	7	7	74	29	+45	67	Promotion to Divizia A
2	Dacia Unirea Brăila	34	21	3	10	56	27	+29	66	
3	Metrom Brașov	34	17	5	12	43	35	+8	56	
4	Gloria Buzău	34	16	6	12	51	46	+5	54	
5	Tractorul Brașov	34	17	3	14	39	38	+1	54	
6	FC Onești	34	15	5	14	51	43	+8	50	
7	Dacia Pitești	34	15	5	14	49	47	+2	50	
8	Electroputere Craiova	34	14	5	15	45	46	−1	47	
9	Rocar București	34	14	5	15	38	50	−12	47	
10	Dunărea Călărași	34	14	4	16	52	47	+5	46	
11	ARO Câmpulung	34	12	10	12	29	40	−11	46	
12	Steaua Mizil	34	14	4	16	43	56	−13	46	
13	Metalul Plopeni	34	11	10	13	31	39	−8	43	
14	Poiana Câmpina	34	13	4	17	42	51	−9	43	
15	Cetatea Târgu Neamț	34	12	6	16	43	43	0	42	
16	Dunărea Galați	34	12	3	19	30	39	−9	39	
17	FC Caracal (R)	34	9	10	15	42	51	−9	37	Relegation to Divizia C
18	Portul Constanța (R)	34	10	5	19	40	71	−31	35	Relegation to Divizia C

Source: romaniansoccer.ro (in Romanian)
Rules for classification: 1) Points; 2) Head-to-head points; 3) Head-to-head goal difference; 4) Head-to-head goals scored; 5) Head-to-head away goals scored; 6) Goal difference; 7) Goals scored.
(C) Champions; (P) Promoted; (R) Relegated

=== Serie II ===
Pos	Team	Pld	W	D	L	GF	GA	GD	Pts	Promotion or relegation
1	Jiul Petroșani (C, P)	34	23	4	7	59	20	+39	73	Promotion to Divizia A
2	Foresta Fălticeni	34	22	2	10	51	29	+22	68	
3	ASA Târgu Mureș	34	17	4	13	58	37	+21	55	
4	Gaz Metan Mediaș	34	15	9	10	48	38	+10	54	
5	UTA Arad	34	15	8	11	59	36	+23	53	
6	Bucovina Suceava	34	17	2	15	51	51	0	53	
7	Unirea Dej	34	16	4	14	56	42	+14	52	
8	CFR Timișoara	34	17	4	13	50	44	+6	55	
9	Corvinul Hunedoara	34	13	8	13	52	43	+9	47	
10	CSM Reșița	34	14	5	15	45	44	+1	47	
11	Minerul Motru	34	13	7	14	33	40	−7	46	
12	Olimpia Satu Mare	34	14	3	17	46	53	−7	45	
13	Maramureș Baia Mare	34	13	6	15	48	55	−7	45	
14	Minaur Zlatna	34	13	5	16	48	42	+6	44	
15	Unirea Alba Iulia	34	13	4	17	49	58	−9	43	
16	Gloria Reșița	34	12	5	17	30	58	−28	41	
17	Bihor Oradea (R)	34	9	4	21	33	74	−41	31	Relegation to Divizia C
18	FC Râmnicu Vâlcea (R)	34	5	6	23	26	78	−52	21	Relegation to Divizia C

Source: romaniansoccer.ro (in Romanian)
Rules for classification: 1) Points; 2) Head-to-head points; 3) Head-to-head goal difference; 4) Head-to-head goals scored; 5) Head-to-head away goals scored; 6) Goal difference; 7) Goals scored.
(C) Champions; (P) Promoted; (R) Relegated

== Top scorers ==
16 goals

- (Romania) Giani Gorga (Steaua Mizil)

15 goals

- (Romania) Adrian Bogoi (Oțelul Târgoviște)

12 goals

- (Romania) Mihai Guriță (Bucovina Suceava)
- (Romania) Cristian Pușcaș (CSM Reșița)

11 goals

- (Romania) Mircea Stanciu (ASA Târgu Mureș)
- (Romania) Doru Balmuș (Dunărea Galați)

9 goals

- (Romania) Lucian Marinescu (CSM Reșița)
- (Romania) Gheorghe Biță (Electroputere Craiova)

8 goals

- (Romania) Costel Lazăr (Poiana Câmpina)
- (Romania) Vasile Bârdeș (Oțelul Târgoviște)

7 goals

- (Romania) Dan Găldean (Minaur Zlatna)

== See also ==
- 1995–96 Divizia A
