= Florin Frunză =

Romanian footballer

Personal information
- Full name: Florin Eugen Frunză
- Date of birth: 30 August 1970 (age 56)
- Place of birth: Rodna, Romania
- Height: 1.81 m (5 ft 11 in)
- Position: Forward

Senior career*
Years	Team	Apps	(Gls)
1991–1994	Maramureș Baia Mare	61	(32)
1995	Rapid București	10	(2)
1995–1997	KRC Harelbeke	51	(8)
1997–1999	Roeselare	60	(21)
1999	KFC Schoten	15	(2)
2000–2002	Roeselare	44	(6)
Total		241	(71)
- * Club domestic league appearances and goals

Florin Eugen Frunză (born 30 August 1970) is a Romanian former professional footballer who played as a forward.

== Honours ==
Maramureș Baia Mare

- Divizia B: 1993–94

Rapid București

- Cupa României runner-up: 1994–95
