= 1958–59 Divizia A =

41st season of top-tier football league in Romania

Divizia A
- Season: 1958–59
- Champions: Petrolul Ploieşti
- Top goalscorer: Gheorghe Ene (18)

The 1958–59 Divizia A was the forty-first season of Divizia A, the top-level football league of Romania.

== Teams ==
Location of teams in 1958-59 Divizia A

== League table ==
Pos	Team	Pld	W	D	L	GF	GA	GD	Pts	Qualification or relegation
1	Petrolul Ploiești (C)	22	15	1	6	47	23	+24	31	Qualification to European Cup preliminary round
2	Dinamo București	22	13	4	5	47	27	+20	30	
3	CCA București	22	12	5	5	35	26	+9	29	
4	Rapid București	22	11	4	7	46	28	+18	26	
5	Dinamo Bacău	22	9	5	8	32	35	−3	23	
6	Progresul București	22	9	3	10	39	34	+5	21	
7	Steagul Roşu Oraşul Stalin	22	7	6	9	31	33	−2	20	
8	UTA Arad	22	7	5	10	27	28	−1	19	
9	Jiul Petroșani	22	7	4	11	26	42	−16	18	
10	Farul Constanța	22	6	5	11	31	53	−22	17	
11	Știința Cluj	22	2	11	9	23	36	−13	15	
12	Știința Timișoara (R)	22	5	5	12	25	44	−19	15	Relegation to Divizia B

Source: LT
Rules for classification: 1) points; 2) goal average; 3) number of goals scored
(C) Champions; (R) Relegated

=== Results ===
Home \ Away	CCA	BAC	DIN	FAR	JIU	PET	PRO	RAP	STR	UTA	ȘCJ	ȘTI
CCA București	—	1–2	0–2	1–1	0–1	2–1	2–1	4–0	1–0	2–1	2–2	2–0
Dinamo Bacău	1–0	—	1–1	4–1	4–1	2–1	3–1	1–2	1–1	0–0	2–0	3–0
Dinamo București	0–1	3–2	—	1–1	2–1	2–0	0–1	2–3	6–0	2–0	1–0	4–1
Farul Constanța	1–3	3–0	1–4	—	3–1	2–1	3–2	0–2	3–1	0–0	3–3	4–1
Jiul Petroșani	1–1	2–1	1–1	5–0	—	2–3	2–1	1–0	1–1	1–0	2–0	1–1
Petrolul Ploiești	6–1	4–1	3–1	1–0	3–0	—	2–1	3–1	1–0	2–0	1–0	7–1
Progresul București	1–3	2–0	1–2	4–1	4–2	0–1	—	1–3	2–1	1–3	4–1	3–0
Rapid București	2–3	4–0	2–3	7–0	5–0	0–0	0–3	—	1–1	2–1	4–0	3–0
Steagul Roşu Oraşul Stalin	1–3	1–1	3–2	3–0	5–0	0–2	2–2	3–2	—	4–1	1–0	2–0
UTA Arad	1–1	0–1	1–2	3–0	3–0	3–1	1–2	0–1	2–1	—	3–2	1–1
Știința Cluj	1–1	1–1	1–1	3–3	2–0	2–3	1–1	2–2	0–0	1–1	—	1–0
Știința Timișoara	0–1	6–1	3–5	3–1	2–1	2–1	1–1	0–0	2–0	1–2	0–0	—

Source: LT (in Romanian)
Legend: Blue = home team win; Yellow = draw; Red = away team win.

== Top goalscorers ==
Rank	Player	Club	Goals
1	Gheorghe Ene	Rapid București	17
2	Mircea Dridea	Petrolul Ploiești	14
2	Nicolae Oaidă	Progresul București	14
4	Ion Alecsandrescu	CCA București	13
5	Constantin Dinulescu	Progresul București	12

== Champion squad ==
Petrolul Ploiești

Goalkeepers: Vasile Sfetcu (20 / 0); Constantin Roman (2 / 0).
Defenders: Gheorghe Pahonțu (22 / 1); Nicolae Marinescu (22 / 0); Nicolae Topșa (16 / 0).
Midfielders: Alexandru Fronea (14 / 1); Ion Neacșu (20 / 0); Nicolae Neacșu (7 / 0); Nicolae Botescu (2 / 0).
Forwards: Ion Zaharia (16 / 8); Alexandru Constantinescu (12 / 2); Constantin Tabarcea (22 / 4); Mircea Dridea (18 / 14); Petre Babone (20 / 10); Pavel Bădulescu-Bardatz (18 / 4); Marcel Marin (9 / 3); Gheorghe Voica (1 / 0); Virgil Dridea (1 / 0).
(league appearances and goals listed in brackets)

Manager: Ilie Oană.

== See also ==
- 1958–59 Divizia B
