= Gheorghe Ene =

Romanian footballer

Gheorghe Ene II
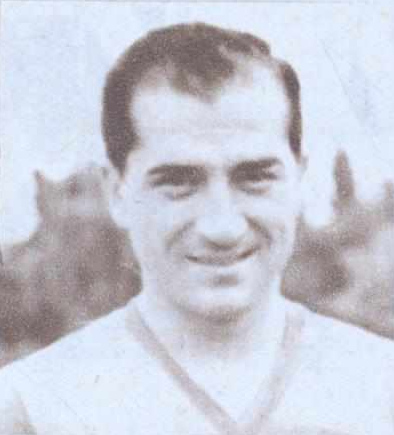
- Ene in 1965

Personal information
- Full name: Gheorghe Ene
- Date of birth: 27 January 1937
- Place of birth: București, Romania
- Date of death: 6 April 2009 (aged 72)
- Place of death: București, Romania
- Height: 1.71 m (5 ft 7 in)
- Position: Striker

Youth career
- 1952–1954: Progresul ICAS București

Senior career*
Years	Team	Apps	(Gls)
1954	Voința București		
1955	Progresul CPCS București		
1956–1960	Rapid București (Note: The statistics for the 1957 unofficial championship called Cupa Primăverii are not taken into consideration.)	73	(36)
1960–1967	Dinamo București	133	(75)
1967–1968	Dinamo Bacău	21	(5)
Total		227	(116)

International career
1955–1961	Romania	3	(0)

Managerial career
- 1975–76: Jiul Petroșani
- 1978: Jiul Petroșani
- Muscelul Câmpulung
- 1979: Unirea Slobozia
- 1980: Olimpia Satu Mare (assistant coach)
- 1980: Olimpia Satu Mare
- 1980–81: Olimpia Satu Mare (assistant coach)
- 1981–82: CS Târgoviște (assistant coach)
- 1982: CS Târgoviște
- 1983: Corvinul Hunedoara
- * Club domestic league appearances and goals

Gheorghe Ene (also known as Gheorghe Ene II; 27 January 1937 – 6 April 2009) was a Romanian football striker and coach.

== Club career ==
Ene was born on 27 January 1937 in București, Romania, and began playing junior-level football in 1952, aged 14 at Progresul ICAS București. In 1954, he started his senior career at Voința București, moving after one season to Progresul CPCS București. On 18 March 1956 he made his Divizia A debut, playing for Rapid București under coach Ferenc Rónay in a 1–1 draw against Minerul Petroșani. During his four seasons spent with The Railwaymen, Ene became the top-scorer of the 1958–59 Divizia A with 17 goals scored.

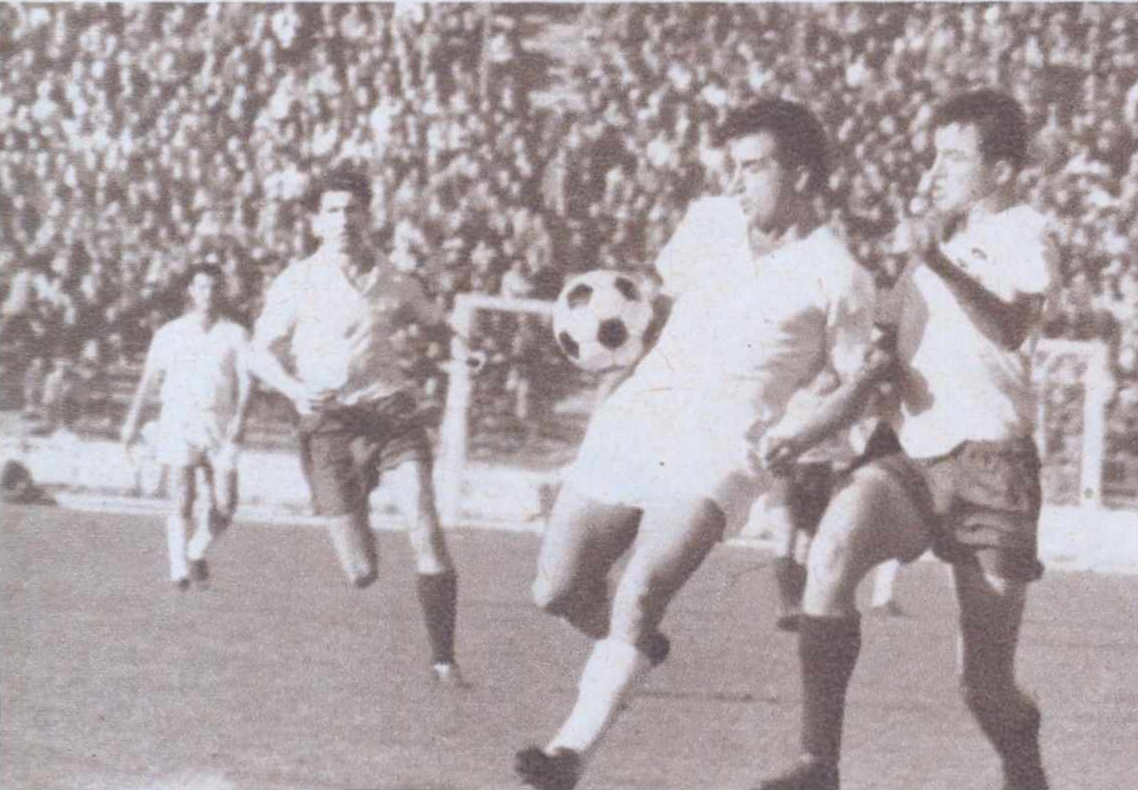
Ene (pictured with the ball) and Mircea Petescu (right) in a derby match (1963)

Ene went to play for Dinamo București where from 1962 to 1965 he helped the club win four consecutive Divizia A titles. In the first one he worked with three coaches, Traian Ionescu, Constantin Teașcă and Nicolae Dumitru, who gave him 20 appearances in which he scored 19 goals. In the following two, Dumitru and Ionescu used him in 19 matches in which he netted seven times in the first and in 14 with five goals scored in the second. In the last one he played 23 games, scoring 15 times under the guidance of Angelo Niculescu. Ene also won the 1963–64 Cupa României with The Red Dogs, coach Ionescu used him for the entire match in the 5–3 victory over rivals Steaua București in the final. He would score two goals in the league in the derby against Steaua, including one in a 3–2 victory. Ene played in 11 European Cup matches in which he scored two goals. In the 1963–64 edition they got past East Germany champion Motor Jena, but were eliminated in the next phase by Real Madrid. In the 1965–66 campaign, he scored two goals against Denmark's champion, Boldklubben 1909 which helped Dinamo advance to the next round. There, they were eliminated by Inter Milan, winners of the previous two seasons of the competition, but earned a historical 2–1 victory in the first leg.

Ene spent the last season of his career at Dinamo Bacău, making his last Divizia A appearance on 9 June 1968 in a 4–1 victory against Farul Constanța, totaling 227 matches with 116 goals in the competition.

== International career ==
Ene played three games for Romania, making his debut under coach Gheorghe Popescu on 15 June 1955 in a 4–1 friendly loss to Sweden. His second game was a 1–1 draw against Yugoslavia in the 1958 World Cup qualifiers. His last appearance was on 8 October 1961 in a friendly that ended with a 4–0 victory against Turkey.

== Managerial career ==
Ene started coaching after he ended his playing career at Dinamo București's children and juniors center. Afterwards he coached senior teams Jiul Petroșani, Unirea Slobozia, Muscelul Câmpulung, CS Târgoviște and Corvinul Hunedoara, mostly in the Romanian lower leagues, having only short spells in Divizia A at Jiul and Corvinul.

== Personal life ==
His brother, Daniel, was also a footballer who played for SC Bacău and Rapid București. Ene died on 6 April 2009 at age 72.

== Honours ==
=== Club ===
Dinamo București

- Divizia A: 1961–62, 1962–63, 1963–64, 1964–65
- Cupa României: 1963–64

=== Individual ===
- Divizia A top scorer: 1958–59
