= Octavian Grigore =

Romanian association football manager and former player

Personal information
- Date of birth: 15 July 1964 (age 62)
- Place of birth: Urlați, Romania
- Height: 1.86 m (6 ft 1 in)
- Position: Centre-back

Youth career
- 1974–1981: Petrolul Ploiești

Senior career*
| Years | Team | Apps | (Gls) |
| 1981–2000 | Petrolul Ploiești | 519 | (74) |

International career
| 1983–1985 | Romania U21 | 6 | (0) |

Managerial career
- 2000–2002: Petrolistul Boldești
- 2002–2003: Petrolul Ploiești
- 2003–2004: Unirea Urziceni
- 2004–2005: Internațional Pitești
- 2006: FCM Târgoviște
- 2006–2007: Chimia Brazi
- 2007–2008: Petrolul Ploiești
- 2008: CFR Timișoara
- 2008–2009: Știința Bacău
- 2010: Chimia Brazi
- 2010: Unirea Urziceni
- 2011–2012: Chimia Brazi
- 2012–2013: Fortuna Brazi
- 2013: Dunărea Galați
- 2015: Viitorul Axintele
- 2015: CSM Ploiești
- 2016–2017: Petrolul Ploiești
- 2018: Petrolul Ploiești (caretaker)
- 2021: Petrolul Ploiești (caretaker)
- 2023–2024: Focșani
- * Club domestic league appearances and goals as of 09:57, 9 January 2024 (UTC)

Octavian "Tavi" Grigore (15 July 1964) is a Romanian professional football manager and former player.

== Playing career ==
Born in Urlați, Prahova County, Grigore played as a centre-back and spent his entire career at nearby team Petrolul Ploiești. He amassed totals of 519 matches and 74 goals during his 19 years with "the Yellow Wolves".

== Managerial career ==
Following his retirement as a player, Grigore started his managerial career by coaching teams such as Unirea Urziceni, FCM Târgoviște or Dunărea Galați among others, but also returning to Petrolul Ploiești for several stints.

== Honours ==
=== Player ===
Petrolul Ploiești

- Divizia B: 1981–82, 1984–85, 1988–89
- Cupa României: 1994–95

=== Manager ===
Petrolul Ploiești

- Divizia B: 2002–03
- Liga IV – Prahova County: 2016–17

== See also ==
- List of one-club men
