= Adrian Bogoi =

Romanian footballer (born 1973)

Personal information
- Full name: Laurențiu Adrian Bogoi
- Date of birth: 16 February 1973 (age 53)
- Place of birth: Târgoviște, Romania
- Height: 1.81 m (5 ft 11 in)
- Position: Defender

Team information
- Current team: Urban Titu (head coach)

Senior career*
Years	Team	Apps	(Gls)
1991–1994	Rapid București	32	(1)
1995	FC Vâlcea	6	(3)
1995–1998	Chindia Târgoviște	89	(16)
1998–2003	Argeș Pitești	101	(1)
2003–2004	Gaz Metan Mediaș	21	(0)
2004–2007	Pandurii Târgu Jiu	73	(4)
2007–2008	FCM Târgoviște	3	(0)
Total		325	(25)

Managerial career
- 2007: FCM Târgoviște
- 2011–2012: Chindia Târgoviște (assistant)
- 2014–2016: Pandurii II Târgu Jiu
- 2017–2019: Pandurii Târgu Jiu
- 2026–: Urban Titu
- * Club domestic league appearances and goals as of 24 January 2018

Laurențiu Adrian Bogoi (born 16 February 1973) is a Romanian former professional footballer who played as a defender. Bogoi played in the Liga I for: Rapid București, Chindia Târgoviște, Argeș Pitești and Pandurii Târgu Jiu. After retirement Bogoi was the chairman of CSM Târgoviște and managed teams like: FCM Târgoviște, Chindia Târgoviște and Pandurii II Târgu Jiu. Currently he is the manager of Liga III side Urban Titu.
