= FCM Târgoviște =

Association football club in Târgoviște

- Full name: Fotbal Club Municipal Târgoviște
- Nicknames: Roș-albaștrii (The Red and Blues); Micul Ajax (The Little Ajax)
- Short name: Târgoviște
- Founded: 1948
- Dissolved: 2018
- Ground: Alpan
- Capacity: 1,000
Home colours	Away colours

Fotbal Club Municipal Târgoviște (Romanian pronunciation: [tɨrˈɡoviʃte]), commonly known as FCM Târgoviște, was a Romanian football team based in Târgoviște, Dâmbovița County, founded in 1948 and disbanded in 2018.

Known under several names throughout its history — Metalul (1948–1954 and 1957–1972), Flacăra (1955), Energia (1956), CS Târgoviște (1972–1994), Oțelul (1994–1996), and Chindia (1996–2003) — the club made nine appearances in Divizia A, the top flight of the Romanian football, between 1961 and 1998, achieving its best result in the 1978–79 season with a 7th-place finish.

The fate of the team became troubled in the 2010s; firstly, Târgoviște was dissolved in 2015, then refounded and enrolled in the sixth division the following year. In 2018, owner Ghiorghi Zotic announced he would cease operations of the men’s team to focus exclusively on the women’s squad.

== History ==
The team was founded in 1948, during the post-war period, as Metalul Târgoviște and competed in the Prahova Regional Championship. After finishing as runners-up in the 1954 Regional Championship and missing out on promotion, the team merged with Flacăra Târgoviște, a club sustained by the Oil Equipment Factory in Târgoviște.

The newly formed side won the 1955 Regional Championship and secured promotion to the newly re-established Divizia C. The squad included the following players Vila, Badea, M. Ionescu, Saita, E. Popescu, Sterescu, Iacob, Tini, Bâclea, Meșină, Bădin, Gruia, Al. Georgescu, Tabarcea, Enache, Borea, and Cătescu.

Renamed Energia in 1956, the club finished 2nd at the end of that season in Series II. After reverting to the name Metalul Târgoviște in 1957, the team once again finished 2nd in the 1957–58 season. In 1958–59, a 3rd-place finish resulted in promotion to the second division due to the dissolution of Divizia C. Consequently, all 3rd-placed teams from the six series entered a promotion play-off. Metalul finished 2nd in Group I, behind Dinamo Miliție București and ahead of CS Piatra Neamț.

Led by Valentin Stănescu from 1959, the club based under the Chindia Tower achieved a surprising turnaround after finishing only 7th in Series II of Divizia B in the 1959–60 season, Metalul went on to win Series I in the 1960–61 season and earned promotion to Divizia A. Among the key figures behind this first major success in Târgoviște’s football history were Prodanciuc, Prandea, Cazacu, Tomescu, M. Nițescu, E. Popescu, C. Ionescu, Barac, Paleru, Cruțiu, Sitaru, Andrei, Brătășanu, Mureșan, A. Georgescu, and Stieber. The stay in the top flight was short-lived, with relegation following a 13th-place finish in the 1961–62 season.

This success remained unique for more than fifteen years, as Metalul finished as runners-up in both the 1962–63 and 1963–64 seasons—tied on points with Știința Craiova in the latter, under the leadership of Petre Moldoveanu, but missing promotion on goal difference. A 10th-place finish in Series I followed in the 1964–65 season, and the club even dropped to Divizia C at the end of the 1965–66 campaign.

After spending two seasons ranked 3rd in the South Series (1966–67 and 1967–68), Metalul returned to Divizia B by winning Series IV and Group I of the promotion play-off, held in București against Știința Bacău, Metalul Plopeni, and IMU Medgidia, in the 1968–69 season. The squad coached by Gheorghe Petrescu featured players such as Stănescu, I. Nițescu, Păun, M. Nițescu, Buciumeanu, Buzatu, Mureșan, Ciobanu, Grigore, C. Ionescu, Pîrvu, Tiron, and Turcu.

Over the years following promotion, Metalul was guided by coaches including Gheorghe Petrescu, Petre Rădulescu, Eugen Popescu, and Nicolae Tătaru, competing in Series I and finishing as runners-up in the 1969–70 season, then placing 3rd in 1970–71 and 12th in 1971–72. In 1972, the team was integrated into the newly formed Club Sportiv Târgoviște and ended the 1972–73 campaign in 11th place. Transferred to Series II for the 1973–74 season, CS Târgoviște finished 12th, then improved to 3rd in 1974–75 and 4th in 1975–76.

At the end of the 1970s and the start of the 1980s, football in Târgoviște reached its peak. Alongside developing a talented generation of players, the Red and Blues secured promotion to Divizia A again in the 1976–77 season by winning Series II of the second division. Under the guidance of head coach Nicolae Proca, the squad included Coman, Stan, Stancu, Șoacăte, I. Ene, Fl. Alexandru, D. Gheorghe, Manea, Grancea, Pitaru, N. Dinu, Istrate, Furnică, Kallo II, Neagu, Dragomirescu, Tătaru, Tănase, Pârvu-Silade, Sava, Enache, Al. Rus, Greaca, and Isaia..

Proca guided Târgoviște through the following two campaigns in the first division, finishing 9th in 1977–78 and achieving the club’s best-ever result with a 7th-place finish in 1978–79, with a squad that included Coman, Bărbulescu, Niculescu, Stancu, D. Gheorghe, I. Ene, Enache, Fl. Alexandru, Dumitrescu, Marinescu, Furnică, Pitaru, Ștefănescu, Kallo, Tătaru, Fl. Grigore, Sava, Isaia, Miu, and Greaca. The 1979–80 season began under Paul Popescu, who led the team through the first fifteen rounds before being replaced by Ștefan Coidum. Despite the change on the bench, the campaign ended in disappointment, as Târgoviștenii placed 16th, tied on points with ASA Târgu Mureș but relegated on goal difference.

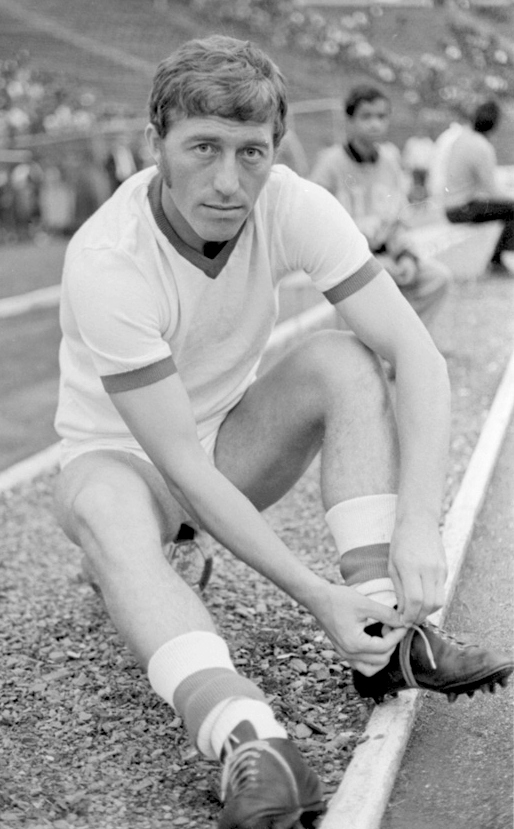
Nicolae Dobrin, legend of Romanian football and player at CS Târgoviște in the 1981–82 season.

Following a brief spell in Divizia B during the 1980–81 season, CS Târgoviște bounced back immediately to the Romanian top flight. With Ștefan Coidum and his assistant Radu Jercan at the helm, the team won Series II of the second division and secured promotion. The squad included Voinea, Miia, Niculescu, I. Constantin, Fl. Alexandru, Dumitrescu, I. Ene, Pitaru, Enache, Marinescu, Filipescu, D. Gheorghe, Economu, Eftimie, Greaca, Sava, Dobrin, Mărgelatu, and O. Popescu.

In the following season, Emeric Jenei took over as head coach but departed with seven rounds remaining, leaving assistant Gheorghe Ene in charge as interim. The squad underwent several changes, with Agiu, Ion Marin, Aelenei, and V. Radu joining the team, while Dobrin left during the campaign. Despite the mid-season upheaval, the team achieved a respectable 9th-place finish in Divizia A, with consistent performances from key players such as Voinea, Pitaru, Dumitrescu, Niculescu, Gheorghe, Economu, Greaca, and O. Popescu playing an essential role throughout the season.

In the 1982–83 season, the team was ranked 14th under Constantin Rădulescu and was relegated at the end of the 1983–84 campaign after finishing last. Afterward, CS Târgoviște struggled to regain its former, competing in Series II of Divizia B and finishing 6th in 1984–85, climbing to 3rd in 1985–86, then placing 5th in 1986–87 and 7th in 1987–88, before slipping to 9th in 1988–89. A slight recovery saw them finish 6th in 1989–90 and 3rd in 1990–91, but the 1991–92 season ended in disappointment as Târgoviștenii ranked 15th in Series I and were relegated to Divizia C.

The year 1995 brought the promotion in the second division, followed by another one in 1996; Under the name CF Chindia and led from the bench by its former player Silviu Dumitrescu, the squad was one of the most notable that ever played on Eugen Popescu Stadium. Even if it probably was not as good as Dumitrescu's generation, the promotion achieved in 1996, after twelve years in the lower divisions, the playing style and the squad, which consisted in local players, earned Chindia the nickname Micul Ajax ("the Little Ajax"). In that squad of Chindia were players such as: Adrian Bogoi, Vasile Bârdeș, Bogdan Liță, Cristian Țermure, Cristian Bălașa, Remus Gâlmencea or Laurențiu Reghecampf. The period of glory was again a very short one and at the end of 1997–98 season Chindia returned to the second division.

In 2003 the team changed its name to FCM Târgoviște, and in the summer of 2004, due to financial issues it almost withdrew from the championship. On 19 August 2004, businessman Ghiorghi Zotic took over the club with the clear goal of saving it from both relegation and bankruptcy.

In 2009, the team relegated back to Liga III and the relationship between Zotic and the Târgoviște Municipality started to strain, just like the one between him and the supporters. In March 2010, the Eugen Popescu Stadium rental agreement expired and was not extended. Since then the club moved away from Târgoviște to the Alpan Stadium in Șotânga. From this point on, FCM started its total decline and in 2015 Zotic dissolved the club's senior squad, only keeping the women's football team. After one year, FCM enrolled in the sixth tier, but after two seasons was dissolved again.

== Chronology of names ==
Period	Name
1948–1954	Metalul Târgoviște
1955	Flacăra Târgoviște
1956	Energia Târgoviște
1957–1972	Metalul Târgoviște
1972–1994	Club Sportiv Târgoviște
1994–1996	Oțelul Târgoviște
1996–2003	Chindia Târgoviște
2003–2018	Fotbal Club Municipal Târgoviște

== Honours ==
Liga II

- Winners (4): 1960–61, 1976–77, 1980–81, 1995–96
- Runners-up (3): 1962–63, 1963–64, 1969–70

Liga III

- Winners (2): 1968–69, 1994–95
- Runners-up (5): 1956, 1957–58, 1976–77, 2002–03, 2009–10

Ploiești Regional Championship

- Winners (1): 1955
- Runners-up (1): 1954

== Former managers ==
- (Romania) Valentin Stănescu (1959–1963)
- (Romania) Petre Moldoveanu (1963–1964)
- (Romania) Nicolae Tătaru (1970–1976)
- (Romania) Paul Popescu (1979)
- (Romania) Ștefan Coidum (1979–1981)
- (Romania) Emerich Jenei (1981–1982)
- (Romania) Gheorghe Ene (1982) interim
- (Romania) Constantin Rădulescu (1982–1983)
- (Romania) Cornel Dinu (1985–1987)
- (Romania) Marcel Pușcaș (1988)
- (Romania) Silviu Dumitrescu (1994–1997)
- (Romania) Ion Motroc (1997)
- (Romania) Constantin Stancu (1997–1998)
- (Romania) Virgil Dridea (2002–2003)
- (Romania) Silviu Dumitrescu (2004–2005)
- (Romania) Leonida Nedelcu (2005–2006)
- (Romania) Octavian Grigore (2006)
- (Romania) Ilie Stan (2006)
- (Romania) Adrian Bogoi (2007)
- (Romania) Gheorghe Petrescu
- (Romania) Petre Rădulescu
- (Romania) Eugen Popescu
