= 1994–95 Cupa României =

Tournament details
- Country: Romania

Final positions
- Champions: Petrolul Ploiești
- Runners-up: Rapid București

The 1994–95 Cupa României was the 57th edition of Romania's most prestigious football cup competition.

The title was won by Petrolul Ploiești against Rapid București.

== Format ==
The competition is an annual knockout tournament.

First round proper matches are played on the ground of the lowest ranked team, then from the second round proper the matches are played on a neutral location.

If a match is drawn after 90 minutes, the game goes into extra time. If the match is still tied, the result is decided by penalty kicks.

In the semi-finals, each tie is played as a two legs.

From the first edition, the teams from Divizia A entered in competition in sixteen finals, rule which remained till today.

== Round of 32 ==
| Team 1 | Score | Team 2 |
|---|---|---|
26 February 1995
| Maramureş Baia Mare (Div. A) | 1–0 | (Div. A) Ceahlăul Piatra Neamț |
| Metrom Braşov (Div. B) | 1–2 | (Div. A) UTA Arad |
| Rocar București (Div. B) | 2–1 | (Div. A) Argeș Pitești |
| Sportul Studenţesc București (Div. A) | 0–1 | (Div. A) Electroputere Craiova |
| Dacia Unirea Brăila (Div. B) | 1–1 (a.e.t.) (3-4 p) | (Div. A) Naţional București |
| Portul Constanța (Div. B) | 0–3 | (Div. A) Steaua București |
| Metalurgistul Cugir (Div. C) | 1–0 | (Div. A) Gloria Bistrița |
| Unirea Dej (Div. B) | 1–0 | (Div. A) FC Brașov |
| Politehnica Iași (Div. B) | 0–1 | (Div. A) Oțelul Galați |
| Minerul Mătăsari (Div. C) | 0–2 | (Div. A) Petrolul Ploiești |
| Dacia Piteşti (Div. B) | 1–3 | (Div. A) Dinamo București |
| Politehnica Timișoara (Div. B) | 2–3 | (Div. A) FC U Craiova |
| Oţelul Târgovişte (Div. C) | 1–0 | (Div. A) Inter Sibiu |
| ASA 1962 Târgu Mureș (Div. B) | 1–2 | (Div. A) Rapid București |
| FC Drobeta-Turnu Severin (Div. C) | 0–1 | (Div. A) Universitatea Cluj |
| Petrolul Ţicleni (Div. C) | 1–2 | (Div. A) Farul Constanța |

== Round of 16 ==
| Team 1 | Score | Team 2 |
|---|---|---|
15 March 1995
| Maramureş Baia Mare | 5–0 | Rocar București |
| Farul Constanța | 0–1 | Universitatea Cluj |
| Rapid București | 4–1 | Steaua București |
| Naţional București | 1–0 (a.e.t.) | Oțelul Galați |
| UTA Arad | 2–0 | Metalurgistul Cugir |
| Electroputere Craiova | 3–1 | Unirea Dej |
| Petrolul Ploiești | 2–0 | Oţelul Târgovişte |
| Dinamo București | 1–3 | FC U Craiova |

== Quarter-finals ==
| Team 1 | Score | Team 2 |
|---|---|---|
12 April 1995
| Universitatea Cluj | 3–0 | Naţional București |
| Rapid București | 4–1 | Maramureş Baia Mare |
| Electroputere Craiova | 1–6 | FC U Craiova |
| Petrolul Ploiești | 2–1 | UTA Arad |

== Semi-finals ==
The matches were played on 10 May and 24 May 1995.

| Team 1 | Agg. | Team 2 | 1st leg | 2nd leg |
|---|---|---|---|---|
| Universitatea Cluj | 0–3 | Petrolul Ploiești | 0–0 | 0–3 |
| Rapid București | 3–0 | FC U Craiova | 2–0 | 1–0 |

== Final ==
21 June 1995
19:00 EEST

| Petrolul Ploieşti | 1–1 (a.e.t.) | Rapid București |
|---|---|---|
| Andreicuţ 82' | Report | Chiriţă 87' |
Penalties
| Zmoleanu (penalty scored); Grigore (penalty scored); Grama (penalty scored); Andreicuţ (penalty scored); Răchită (penalty scored) | 5–3 | (penalty scored) Lupu; (penalty scored) Chiriţă; (penalty scored) Vlădoiu; (penalty missed) Frunză |

Stadionul Naţional, Bucharest
Attendance: 30,000
Referee: Ion Crăciunescu (Romania)

Cupa României 1994–95 winners

2nd title
