= 1990–91 FC Dinamo București season =

FC Dinamo București
1990–91 season
- Manager: Gheorghe Mulţescu (rounds 1-28), Florin Halagian (rounds 29-34)
- Divizia A: 3rd
- Romanian Cup: Quarterfinals
- European Cup: Second round
- Top goalscorer: Marian Damaschin (15 goals)

The 1990–91 season was FC Dinamo București's 42nd season in Divizia A. It is the first season started after the Romanian Revolution, event that opened the borders. Because of this, Dinamo lost almost an entire team, and also his coach, Mircea Lucescu, all of them starting their careers abroad. That's why Dinamo started to build another team and ended this season without silverware. In the championship, the team finished third, seven points behind champions Universitatea Craiova. The same team from Oltenia ended the dream for Dinamo in the Romanian Cup.

In the European Cup, Dinamo began with the elimination of Irish team St Patrick's Athletic Dublin (4-0 and 1-1). Dinamo was eliminated in the second round by FC Porto.

== Results ==
Divizia A
| Round | Date | Opponent | Stadium | Result |
|---|---|---|---|---|
| 1 | 12 August 1990 | Petrolul Ploieşti | H | 3–1 |
| 2 | 18 August 1990 | SC Bacău | A | 0–0 |
| 3 | 22 August 1990 | Politehnica Timişoara | H | 0–0 |
| 4 | 2 September 1990 | Jiul Petroşani | A | 2–1 |
| 5 | 15 September 1990 | FC Argeş | H | 2–0 |
| 6 | 23 September 1990 | Inter Sibiu | A | 0–2 |
| 7 | 29 September 1990 | Corvinul Hunedoara | H | 2–0 |
| 8 | 7 October 1990 | Sportul Studenţesc | A | 3–1 |
| 9 | 10 October 1990 | Steaua București | H | 1–0 |
| 10 | 19 October 1990 | Universitatea Craiova | A | 0–1 |
| 11 | 28 October 1990 | Progresul Brăila | H | 0–0 |
| 12 | 3 November 1990 | FC Bihor | A | 2–2 |
| 13 | 11 November 1990 | FC Brașov | H | 4–0 |
| 14 | 18 November 1990 | Gloria Bistriţa | A | 1–1 |
| 15 | 25 November 1990 | U Cluj | H | 7–2 |
| 16 | 28 November 1990 | Farul Constanţa | A | 0–0 |
| 17 | 9 December 1990 | Rapid București | H | 1–0 |
| 18 | 3 March 1991 | Petrolul Ploieşti | A | 0–2 |
| 19 | 10 March 1991 | FC Bacău | H | 2–1 |
| 20 | 17 March 1991 | Politehnica Timişoara | A | 1–3 |
| 21 | 21 March 1991 | Jiul Petroşani | H | 2–0 |
| 22 | 6 April 1991 | FC Argeş | A | 1–1 |
| 23 | 12 April 1991 | Inter Sibiu | H | 2–1 |
| 24 | 21 April 1991 | Corvinul Hunedoara | A | 1–2 |
| 25 | 28 April 1991 | Sportul Studenţesc | H | 0–0 |
| 26 | 5 May 1991 | Steaua București | A | 0–1 |
| 27 | 11 May 1991 | Universitatea Craiova | H | 1–1 |
| 28 | 19 May 1991 | Dacia Unirea Brăila | A | 1–2 |
| 29 | 26 May 1991 | FC Bihor | H | 5–0 |
| 30 | 2 June 1991 | FC Brașov | A | 1–1 |
| 31 | 9 June 1991 | Gloria Bistriţa | H | 2–1 |
| 32 | 12 June 1991 | U Cluj | A | 3–0 |
| 33 | 16 June 1991 | Farul Constanța | H | 4–0 |
| 34 | 23 June 1991 | Rapid București | A | 0–0 |

Cupa României
| Round | Date | Opponent | Stadium | Result |
|---|---|---|---|---|
| Last 32 | 12 December 1990 | Electroputere Craiova | Craiova | 1–0 |
| Last 16 | 27 February 1991 | Politehnica Timişoara | Turnu Severin | 3–1 |
| Quarterfinals 1st Leg | 13 March 1991 | Universitatea Craiova | H | 1–0 |
| Quarterfinals 2nd Leg | 1 May 1991 | Universitatea Craiova | A | 0-2 (a.e.t.) |

== European Cup ==
First round

19 September 1990
17:00

| Dinamo București | 4–0 | St Patrick's Athletic |
|---|---|---|
| Doboş 2'; Damaschin 19'; Mateuţ 24'; Cheregi 80' |

Stadionul Dinamo, Bucharest
Referee: Friedrich Kaupe (Austria)

3 October 1990
19:30

| St Patrick's Athletic | 1–1 | Dinamo București |
|---|---|---|
| Fenlon 37' | | Mateuţ 76' |

Tolka Park, Dublin
Attendance: 4,000
Referee: Kurt Sörensen (Denmark)

Dinamo București beat St Patrick's Athletic 5-1 on aggregate.

Second round

24 October 1990
15:00

| Dinamo București | 0–0 | F.C. Porto |

Stadionul Dinamo, Bucharest
Attendance: 8,000
Referee: Helmut Kohl (Austria)

7 November 1990
22:30

| F.C. Porto | 4–0 | Dinamo București |
|---|---|---|
| Kostadinov 3', 22'; Geraldão 48' (pen.); Domingos 63' |

Estádio das Antas, Porto
Attendance: 50,000
Referee: Tulio Lanese (Italy)

Porto beat Dinamo București 4-0 on aggregate.

== Squad ==
Goalkeepers: Bogdan Stelea (26/0), Costel Câmpeanu (8/0).

Defenders: Adrian Matei (26/2), Tibor Selymes (26/2), Anton Doboş (22/1), Tudorel Cristea (16/4), Iulian Mihăescu (15/1), Mircea Rednic (15/0), Augustin Eduard (11/0), Bogdan Bucur (5/0), Alexandru Nicolae (3/0), Michael Klein (2/0), Cristinel Atomulesei (0/0).

Midfielders: Constantin Marcu (29/8), Marius Cheregi (29/5), Costel Pană (24/3), Ionel Fulga (19/0), Cezar Zamfir (18/0), Daniel Timofte (15/2), Vasile Miriuță (15/1), Dorin Mateuţ (8/5), Mircea Tertici (1/0), Răzvan Matache (1/0).

Forwards: Marian Damaschin (31/15), Sorin Răducanu (14/1), Daniel Scînteie (5/0), Marian Savu (4/0), Claudiu Vaişcovici (4/0), Costel Orac (2/1).

== Transfers ==
Dinamo brought Augustin Eduard (Argeș Pitești), Marius Cheregi (FC Bihor), Constantin Marcu (Flacăra Moreni), Tibor Selymes (FC Braşov), Costel Pană (Flacăra Moreni) and Ionel Fulga. In the winter break, Vasile Miriuţă was brought from FC Maramureş and Tudorel Cristea from Sportul Studenţesc.

In the summer break left the team Sorin Colceag (Universitatea Cluj), Ioan Andone (Elche), Michael Klein (Bayer Uerdingen), Ioan Lupescu (Bayer Leverkusen), Dănuţ Lupu (Panathinaikos), Ioan Sabău (Feyenoord), Florin Răducioiu (Bari).

In the winter break, Dorin Mateuţ left the team for Real Zaragoza, Daniel Timofte for Bayer Uerdingen and Mircea Rednic was transferred to Bursaspor.
