= 1984–85 FC Dinamo București season =

FC Dinamo București
1984–85 season
- Manager: Cornel Dinu (rounds 1-22), Iosif Varga (rounds 23-34)
- Divizia A: 2nd
- Romanian Cup: Semifinals
- European Cup: Second round
- Top goalscorer: Marin Dragnea (11 goals)

The 1984–85 season was FC Dinamo București's 36th season in Divizia A. Dinamo starts the season with a new manager, Cornel Dinu being promoted from his assistant position. In the Romanian championship, Dinamo finishes second, after three consecutive titles, being overtaken by Steaua, the same team that beat them in the semifinals of the Romanian Cup.

In the first round of the European Champions Cup, Dinamo meets Omonia Nicosia: 4-1 and 1–2. Next is the match against Girondins Bordeaux (club of Tigana, Giresse, Lacombe and Battiston), Dinamo being eliminated after 0-1 and 1-1.

== Results ==
Divizia A
Round	Date	Opponent	Stadium	Result
1	2 September 1984	ASA Târgu Mureș	H	1-0
2	5 September 1984	FC Olt	A	1-0
3	15 September 1984	Corvinul Hunedoara	H	2-1
4	23 September 1984	Sportul Studențesc	A	3-3
5	26 September 1984	FC Argeș	A	0-0
6	29 September 1984	Chimia Râmnicu Vâlcea	H	4-2
7	7 October 1984	U Craiova	A	4-2
8	14 October 1984	Rapid București	H	1-1
9	18 October 1984	Poli Iași	H	4-3
10	28 October 1984	Gloria Buzău	A	0-0
11	31 October 1984	SC Bacău	H	2-0
12	11 November 1984	Steaua București	A	2-1
13	18 November 1984	Jiul Petroșani	A	1-1
14	25 November 1984	FCM Brașov	H	2-0
15	2 December 1984	Poli Timișoara	A	0-0
16	8 December 1984	FC Bihor	H	4-0
17	12 December 1984	FC Baia Mare	A	0-0
18	3 March 1985	ASA Târgu Mureș	A	1-0
19	10 March 1985	FC Olt	H	4-0
20	13 March 1985	Corvinul Hunedoara	A	2-2
21	16 March 1985	Sportul Studențesc	H	1-2
22	23 March 1985	FC Argeș	H	3-2
23	7 April 1985	Chimia Râmnicu Vâlcea	A	1-0
24	10 April 1985	U Craiova	H	0-0
25	14 April 1985	Rapid București	A	3-2
26	20 April 1985	Poli Iași	A	2-1
27	4 May 1985	Gloria Buzău	H	2-0
28	12 May 1985	SC Bacău	A	0-3
29	15 May 1985	Steaua București	H	0-0
30	19 May 1985	Jiul Petroșani	H	3-1
31	23 May 1985	FCM Brașov	A	0-2
32	9 June 1985	Poli Timișoara	H	3-2
33	16 June 1985	FC Bihor	A	1-0
34	19 June 1985	FC Baia Mare	H	2-0

Cupa României
Round	Date	Opponent	Stadium	Result
Last 32	29 November 1984	Șurianul Sebeș	A	6-1
Last 16	20 February 1985	Corvinul Hunedoara	Alba Iulia	2-1
Quarterfinals	27 February 1985	Chimia Râmnicu Vâlcea	Ploiești	3-1
Semifinals	12 June 1985	Steaua București	București	0-5

== European Cup ==
First round

19 September 1984
17:00

Dinamo București	4–1	Omonia Nicosia
Orac 25', 35'; Tulba 28'; Ţălnar 33'		Savides 17'

Stadionul Dinamo, Bucharest
Attendance: 17,000
Referee: Stoian Ilievski (Yugoslavia)

3 October 1984
20:30

Omonia Nicosia	2–1	Dinamo București
Djevizov 54'; Mavris 62'		Movilă 88'

Makario Stadium, Nicosia
Referee: Ivan Iosifov (Bulgaria)

Dinamo București won 5–3 on aggregate

Second round

24 October 1984
20:30

Girondins Bordeaux	1–0	Dinamo București
Müller 35'

Stade Municipal, Bordeaux
Attendance: 35,000
Referee: Franz Wöhrer (Austria)

7 November 1984
18:00

Dinamo București	1 – 1 (a.e.t.)	Girondins Bordeaux
Dragnea 9'		Lacombe 113'

Stadionul 23 August, Bucharest
Attendance: 60,000
Referee: Brian McGinlay (Scotland)

FC Girondins de Bordeaux won 2-1 on aggregate

== Squad ==
Goalkeepers: Dumitru Moraru, Ovidiu Barba, Constantin Eftimescu, Andrei Toma

Defenders: Mircea Rednic, Ioan Andone, Ion Marin, Nelu Stănescu, Cornel Mirea, Alexandru Nicolae, Nicușor Vlad, Teofil Stredie, Eugen Frîncu, Niculae Ivan.

Midfielders: Ionel Augustin, Marin Dragnea, Gheorghe Mulțescu, Alexandru Suciu, Ioan Zare, Lică Movilă, Grațian Moldovan.

Forwards: Marian Damaschin, Costel Orac, Cornel Țălnar, Gheorghe Tulba, Sorin Răducanu.

== Transfers ==
Dinamo brought Alexandru Suciu (U Cluj), Nicușor Vlad and Teofil Stredie (Corvinul). Marin Ion is transferred to FC Bihor. Sorin Răducanu makes his debut.
