= Vasile Simionaș =

Romanian footballer and manager (1950–2025)

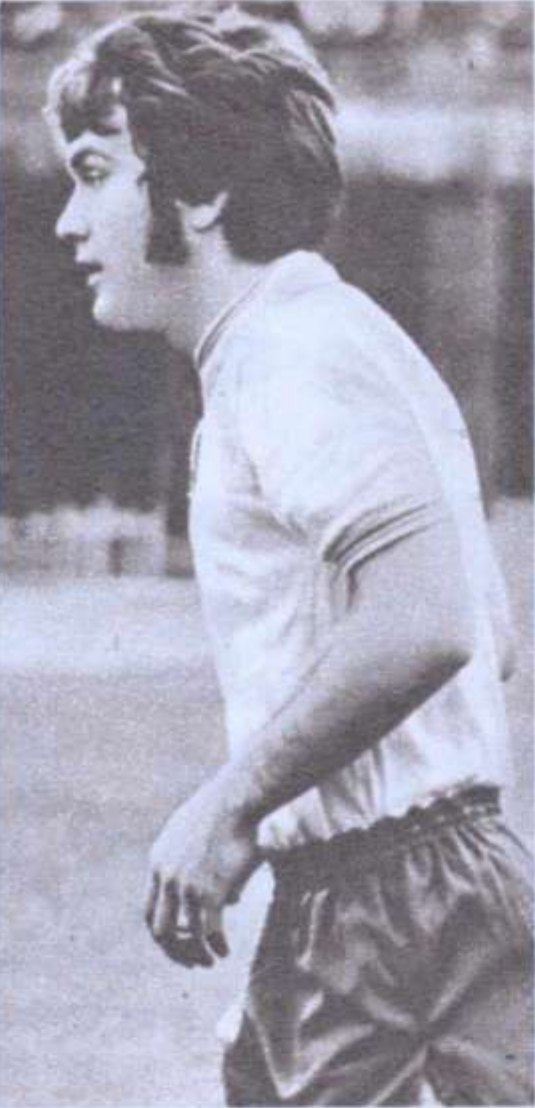

Personal information
- Date of birth: 16 November 1950
- Place of birth: Iași, Romania
- Date of death: 19 March 2025 (aged 74)
- Place of death: Iași, Romania
- Height: 1.73 m (5 ft 8 in)
- Position: Midfielder

Youth career
- 1964–1966: Laminorul Roman
- 1966–1968: Victoria Roman

Senior career*
Years	Team	Apps	(Gls)
1968–1969	Dinamo Bacău	9	(1)
1969–1984	Politehnica Iași (Note: The statistics for the 1972–73 and 1981–82 Divizia B seasons are unavailable.)	359	(42)
1985	CSM Suceava		
Total		368	(43)

International career
1971	Romania U23	8	(0)
1972	Romania Olympic	1	(0)
1972–1976	Romania	3	(0)

Managerial career
- 1983–1984: Politehnica Iași
- 1984–1985: Politehnica Iași (assistant)
- 1985: CSM Suceava
- 1985–1986: Politehnica Iași
- 1986–1988: CSM Suceava
- 1988: Ceahlăul Piatra Neamț
- 1989: CFR Pașcani
- 1989–1990: Politehnica Iași
- 1991: Dacia Unirea Brăila
- 1991–1992: Progresul București
- 1993–1994: Politehnica Iași
- 1994–1999: Oțelul Galați
- 1999: Astra Ploiești
- 2000: Farul Constanța
- 2001–2002: Politehnica Iași
- 2003–2004: Politehnica Iași
- 2013: Kosarom Pașcani
- 2021–2025: Politehnica Iași (board member)
Medal record
Representing Romania
Universiade
Gold medal – first place	1972 Romania	Team
- * Club domestic league appearances and goals

Vasile Simionaș (16 November 1950 – 19 March 2025) was a Romanian professional football manager and football player who played as a midfielder.

== Club career ==
Simionaș was born on 16 November 1950 in Iași, Romania. At the age of two, his family moved to Bârlad, then in 1956 they settled in Roman where he spent most of his childhood. He started playing junior level football at the age of 14 at Laminorul Roman. In 1966 he went to neighboring club Victoria where he continued to play at junior level but also at senior level in Divizia C and Divizia B. After scoring a goal from the center of the field in a game, an official from Dinamo Bacău brought him to the team. At Bacău he learned a lot about football from the club's youth coach, Costică Rădulescu. On 27 April 1968, at the age of 17, Simionaș made his Divizia A debut for Bacău when he was sent by coach Nicolae Dumitru for the last 20 minutes of a 2–0 away loss to Progresul București. He scored his first goal in the spring of 1969 in Bacău's 3–1 home win against Steaua București.

In June 1969, he moved back to his hometown at Politehnica Iași. Over the years at Politehnica he was coached by managers such as Virgil Mărdărescu or Ilie Oană, and together with Mihai Romilă and Gabriel Simionov he formed one of the best midfield lines of the Romanian league in the 1970s. Until 1984, Simionaș played 359 Divizia A matches for The Copou Squad, scoring 42 goals, and during this period, the team was relegated twice to Divizia B, but he stayed with the club, helping it get promoted back each time after one year.

In 1985 he played the last games of his career while being a player-coach at CSM Suceava in Divizia B. Simionaș has a total of 368 matches with 43 goals netted in the Romanian top-league, Divizia A.

== International career ==
In 1971, Simionaș played eight games for Romania's under-23 squad. He also played for Romania's Olympic team in a 3–2 home loss to Denmark in the 1972 Summer Olympics qualifiers. He won the Universiade gold medal with Romania's students football team in the 1972 edition hosted by Romania.

Simionaș made his first appearance for Romania on 30 January 1972 as coach Gheorghe Ola used him the entire match in a friendly which ended with a 4–2 away victory against Morocco. His following game was a 1–0 loss to Bulgaria in the 1973–76 Balkan Cup final. Simionaș's third and last match played for the national team took place on 2 July 1976 in a 2–2 draw against Iran.

== Managerial career ==
Simionaș, while still an active player, was appointed head coach at Politehnica Iași for the 1983–84 Divizia A season. He finished the season in eight place but despite this performance, he was replaced with Constantin Oțet for the following season, remaining in the club as his assistant. However, the results were poor and he and Oțet had to leave the team. Shortly afterwards, Simionaș went as a player-coach at Divizia B club CSM Suceava. He did not spend much time at Suceava as he was called back to Politehnica Iași, but could not avoid the team's relegation. He stayed with the club, fighting for promotion with Oțelul Galați but eventually failing to promote.

He made a comeback at Suceava, managing to gain promotion to the first league after competing with Politehnica Iași at the end of the 1986–87 Divizia B season. In the following season, Simionaș did not manage to keep Suceava in the first league, leaving with a few rounds before the end of the season. In the next two years he had spells at Ceahlăul Piatra Neamț, CFR Pașcani and Politehnica Iași. In 1991 he went to Dacia Unirea Brăila which he helped avoid relegation to Divizia B. He then went to work at Progresul București which he got promoted from the second to the first division. He returned to Politehnica Iași in Divizia B, trying to gain promotion but eventually finishing second, below Argeș Pitești.

In 1994, Simionaș started the most successful spell of his coaching career at Oțelul Galați. Over the course of five seasons the team finished twice in fourth place, being known for winning its home games against top teams which earned them the nickname "The Graveyard of the Giants". He participated twice with Oțelul in the UEFA Cup, first in the 1997–98 edition where they were eliminated in the first qualifying round by HIT Gorica. Subsequently, in the 1998–99 campaign they got past Sloga Jugomagnat, but were eliminated in the second qualifying round by Vejle. In 1997 he was named the best coach from Romania.

Afterwards he had two unsuccessful spells at Astra Ploiești and Farul Constanța, experiencing relegation with the latter. In 2001 he made another comeback at Politehnica Iași, which was in Divizia C, helping it earn promotion to the second league at the end of his first season. After two seasons in Divizia B, during the first of which he was replaced for the second half of the season, he managed to earn promotion to Divizia A in 2004. Following a disappointing start in the following season, he was replaced with Ionuț Popa.

After 2005, Simionaș started to work as an observer for the Romanian Football Federation and also managed Kosarom Pașcani for a short period in 2013.

Simionaș has a total of 456 matches as a manager in the Romanian top-division, Divizia A, consisting of 118 victories, 47 draws and 114 losses.

== Personal life and death ==
On 28 February 2025 he was named Honorary Citizen of Iași.

Simionaș died on 19 March 2025 in Iași at age 74.

== Honours ==
=== Player ===
Victoria Roman

- Divizia C: 1966–67

Politehnica Iași

- Divizia B: 1972–73, 1981–82

=== Manager ===
CSM Suceava

- Divizia B: 1986–87

Progresul București

- Divizia B: 1991–92

Politehnica Iași

- Divizia C: 2001–02
- Divizia B: 2003–04
