= Mihai Romilă =

Romanian footballer (1950–2020)

Personal information
- Date of birth: 1 October 1950
- Place of birth: Huși, Romania
- Date of death: 27 June 2020 (aged 69)
- Place of death: Iași, Romania
- Positions: Midfielder; forward

Youth career
- 1966–1968: CSMS Iași

Senior career*
Years	Team	Apps	(Gls)
1968–1969	Nicolina Iași	40	(0)
1970	Gloria Bârlad	12	(0)
1970–1971	ASA Sibiu	23	(0)
1971–1983	Politehnica Iași	367	(65)
1983–1984	Dunărea Galați	14	(1)
Total		456	(66)

International career
1976	Romania Olympic	1	(0)
1975–1979	Romania	18	(1)
- * Club domestic league appearances and goals

Mihai Romilă (1 October 1950 – 27 June 2020) was a Romanian football midfielder.

== Club career ==
Romilă was born on 1 October 1950 in Huși, Romania. He started playing junior level football in 1966 at CSMS Iași. Two years later he moved to neighboring club, Nicolina where he started his senior career, playing in Divizia C. In 1970 he went to play at Divizia B level for Gloria Bârlad, moving half a year later to ASA Sibiu back in Divizia C.

In 1971, Romilă made a comeback to Iași, joining Politehnica, making his Divizia A debut on 29 August under coach Virgil Mărdărescu in a 2–2 draw against Farul Constanța. At the end of his first season the team was relegated, but he stayed with the club, helping it get promoted back to the first league after one year. Over the years at Politehnica, Romilă together with Vasile Simionaș and Gabriel Simionov formed one of the best midfield lines of the Romanian league in the 1970s. In the 1980–81 season, he scored a personal record of 10 league goals, but the team was relegated. He helped it get promoted back to the first league once again after one year.

Romilă joined Dunărea Galați for the 1983–84 season, making his last Divizia A appearance on 4 December 1983 in a 1–0 home loss to SC Bacău, totaling 324 matches with 55 goals in the competition.

== International career ==
Romilă played 18 matches for Romania, making his debut on 17 December 1975 under coach Cornel Drăgușin in a 1–1 draw against Scotland in the Euro 1976 qualifiers. He made three appearances during each of the World Cup 1978 qualifiers and the Euro 1980 qualifiers, including two victories against Yugoslavia. He scored his only goal for the national team in a 2–1 friendly loss to Greece. On 1 June 1979, he made his last appearance for The Tricolours in a friendly which ended with a 1–0 away loss to East Germany. Romilă also played one game for Romania's Olympic team in a 1–0 victory against France in the 1976 Summer Olympics qualifiers.

=== International goals ===
Scores and results list Romania's goal tally first. "Score" column indicates the score after each Mihai Romilă goal.

#	Date	Venue	Opponent	Score	Result	Competition
1.	13 December 1978	Leoforos Alexandras Stadium, Athens, Greece	Greece	1–2	1–2	Friendly

== After retirement ==
After he ended his playing career, Romilă worked as a youth coach, being known to discover and form Mihai Pintilii at Noua Generație Iași.

== Personal life ==
Romilă's brothers, Dumitru and Vasile, were also footballers who played for Politehnica Iași.

== Death ==
Romilă died on 27 June 2020 in Iași at age 69.

== Honours ==
Politehnica Iași

- Divizia B: 1972–73, 1981–82
