= Constantin Simirad =

Romanian politician (1941–2021)

President of the Iași County Council
- In office 1 June 2008 – 2012
- Preceded by: Lucian Flaișer
- Succeeded by: Cristian Adomniței

Ambassador of Romania to Cuba
- In office 28 November 2003 – December 2006

Mayor of Iași
- In office 22 June 1992 – 28 November 2003
- Preceded by: Vasile Dumitriu
- Succeeded by: Gheorghe Nichita

Personal details
- Born: 13 May 1941 Coțușca, Botoșani County, Kingdom of Romania
- Died: 28 March 2021 (aged 79) Iași, Romania
- Party: PSD; PAC; UNPR

Constantin Simirad (13 May 1941 – 28 March 2021) was a Romanian politician and academic.

== Biography ==
Simirad was born on 13 May 1941 in Coțușca, Botoșani County. He graduated from Iași National College and the University of Iași. He first began teaching secondary school in Dorohoi from 1965 to 1968. In 1968, he became an assistant professor of mathematics at the Gheorghe Asachi Technical University of Iași and was subsequently taught at the Faculty of Mathematics at the University of Oran. He earned his doctorate in mathematics in 1979.

Simirad entered politics in 1991 with the Partidul Alianța Civică (PAC). The following year, he was elected Mayor of Iași, running as a member of the Romanian Democratic Convention. He was re-elected in 1996 with 71% of the vote. He left PAC in 1998 and founded the Partidului Moldovenilor, which he led until 2002. That year, the party merged with the Social Democratic Party (PSD), of which he became vice-president. On 28 November 2003, he left Iași and was appointed Ambassador of Romania to Cuba by President Ion Iliescu. Upon his return to Romania in 2006, he retired.

On 28 March 2008, the PSD nominated him to run as President of the Iași County Council. He was elected on 1 June 2008 with 36.5% of the vote. However, he was expelled from PSD in September 2009 after voicing his support for President Traian Băsescu. He then joined National Union for the Progress of Romania (UNPR). In 2012, he was defeated in his re-election bid for President of the County Council alongside his party's mayoral candidate Tudor Ciuhodaru.

Constantin Simirad died of COVID-19 in Iași on 28 March 2021, at the age of 79. He is buried at Eternitatea Cemetery.

== Publications ==
- Audiențe în aer liber (2000)
- Bordura de ipsos (2001)
- În umbra zeilor (2001)
- Simfonia vieții (2003)
- Arca lui Noe (2003)
- Izgoniții din rai (2005)
