= Vasile Ianul =

Romanian footballer (1945–2013)

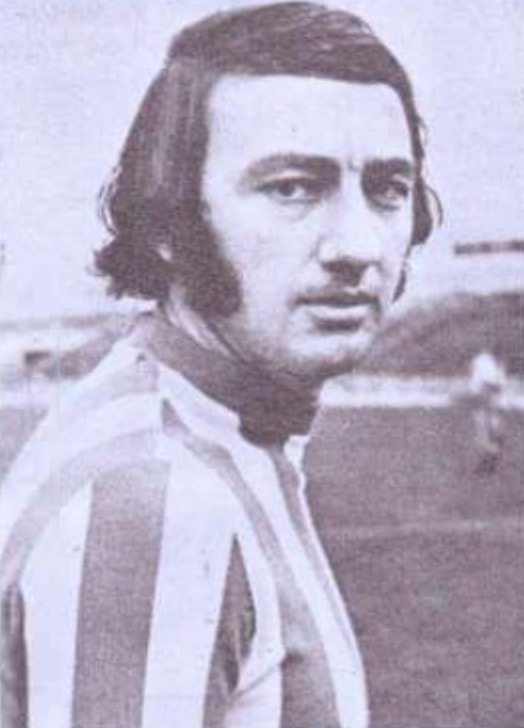
- Ianul în 1972.

Personal information
- Date of birth: 1 November 1945
- Place of birth: Năsăud, Romania
- Date of death: 20 March 2013 (aged 67)
- Place of death: Iași, Romania
- Position: Defender

Senior career*
Years	Team	Apps	(Gls)
1966–1974	Politehnica Iași		

International career
1972	Romania	1	(0)

Managerial career
- 1983: Politehnica Iași
- * Club domestic league appearances and goals

Vasile Ianul (1 November 1945 – 20 March 2013) was a Romanian footballer who played as a defender. He died on 20 March 2013.

== Career ==
Vasile Ianul played as a defender for Politehnica Iași from 1966 until 1974, a period in which he helped the club win two promotions in the first league. After he ended his playing career, Ianul worked as a lawyer and in 1975 he became a football referee, managing to arbitrate matches in the Romanian top-division Divizia A. From 1981 until 1985 he was Politehnica Iași's president a period in which the club managed to win a promotion to the first league in the 1981–82 season, also being the club's coach for a short period in 1983. In 1985 he became the head of Dinamo București's football section, in 1991 he was named the club's vice-president and from 1992 until 1994, Ianul was president. During this period of nine years spent at Dinamo, the club won two league titles, two cups and reached the European Cup Winners' Cup semi-finals in the 1989–1990 edition. In 1998 Ianul was charged with fraudulent management of Dinamo's funds, remanded in custody twice, first between November 20–30, 1998, and the second time between May 12, 1999 and January 11, 2002, he was sentenced to 12 years in prison. Later, however, the punishment was annulled, because the prescription intervened in the case of the transfers of footballers Dorinel Munteanu, Ioan Sabău and Bogdan Stelea.

== International career ==
Vasile Ianul played one game at international level for Romania, being used by coach Gheorghe Ola in a 1972 friendly, played on Stade d'Honneur from Casablanca, which ended with a 4–2 victory against Morocco.

== Honours ==
=== Player ===
Politehnica Iași

- Divizia B: 1967–68, 1972–73
