= Ionuț Zaharia =

Romanian professional footballer

Personal information
- Full name: Ionuț Andrei Zaharia
- Date of birth: 19 July 2003 (age 23)
- Place of birth: Moreni, Romania
- Height: 1.80 m (5 ft 11 in)
- Positions: Attacking midfielder; forward

Team information
- Current team: Flacăra Moreni

Youth career
- 2009–2015: Flacăra Moreni
- 2016–2017: Atherstone Rangers
- 2018–2021: Astra Giurgiu

Senior career*
Years	Team	Apps	(Gls)
2018–2020	Astra II Giurgiu	16	(6)
2020–2022	Astra Giurgiu	21	(1)
2022–2023	Petrolul Ploiești	0	(0)
2023	→ Flacăra Moreni (loan)	9	(4)
2023–2024	Flacăra Moreni	26	(7)
2024	Argeș Pitești	0	(0)
2024–2026	CS Dinamo București	36	(9)
2026–	Flacăra Moreni		
- * Club domestic league appearances and goals as of 9 May 2026

Ionuț Andrei Zaharia (born 19 July 2003) is a Romanian professional footballer who plays as an attacking midfielder or a forward for Liga III club Flacăra Moreni.

== Honours ==
Astra Giurgiu

- Cupa României runner-up: 2020–21

CS Dinamo București

- Liga III: 2024–25
