= Dragnea =

Dragnea is a surname. Notable people with the surname include:

- Marin Dragnea (born 1956), Romanian footballer
- Liviu Dragnea (born 1962), Romanian engineer and politician
