= Slobozia Moară =

- Commune
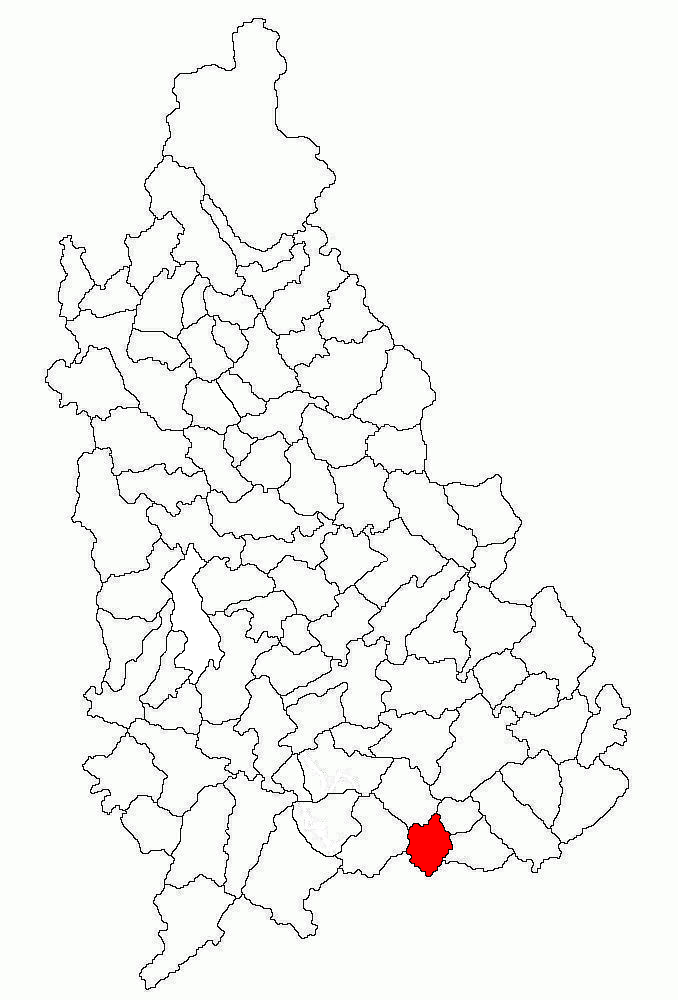
- Location in Dâmbovița County

- Location in Romania
- Coordinates: 44°36′N 25°42′E
- Country: Romania
- County: Dâmbovița

Government
  - Mayor (2020–2024): Răzvan Bucur (PSD)
- Area: 16.71 km^{2} (6.45 sq mi)
- Elevation: 128 m (420 ft)
- Population (2021-12-01): 1,988
  - Density: 120/km^{2} (310/sq mi)
- Time zone: EET/EEST (UTC+2/+3)
- Postal code: 137420
- Area code: +(40) 245
- Vehicle reg.: DB
- Website: www.comunasloboziamoara.ro

Slobozia Moară is a commune in Dâmbovița County, Muntenia, Romania with a population of 1,988 people as of 2021. It is composed of a single village, Slobozia Moară.

Historical population
Year	Pop.	±%
2002	2,366	—
2011	2,165	−8.5%
2021	1,988	−8.2%
Source: Census data

== Natives ==
- Marin Dragnea (born 1956), footballer
