= Coțușca =

- Commune
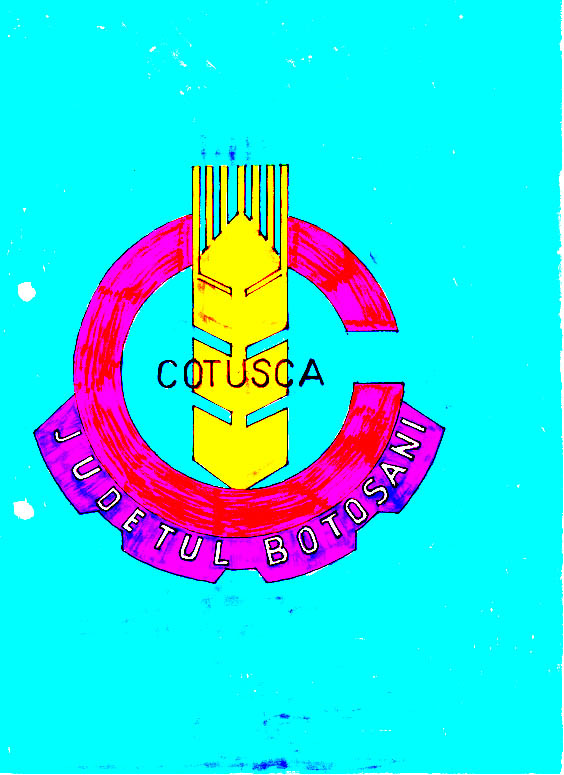
- Coat of arms

- Location in Botoșani County

- Location in Romania
- Coordinates: 48°8′N 26°51′E
- Country: Romania
- County: Botoșani
- Subdivisions: Coțușca, Avram Iancu, Cotu Miculinți, Crasnaleuca, Ghireni, Mihail Kogălniceanu, Nichiteni, Nicolae Bălcescu, Puțureni

Government
  - Mayor (2024–2028): Constantin Viorel Ciobanu (PSD)
- Area: 121.85 km^{2} (47.05 sq mi)
- Elevation: 180 m (590 ft)
- Population (2021-12-01): 4,126
  - Density: 34/km^{2} (88/sq mi)
- Time zone: EET/EEST (UTC+2/+3)
- Postal code: 717090
- Area code: +40 x31
- Vehicle reg.: BT

Coțușca is a commune in Botoșani County, Western Moldavia, Romania. It is composed of nine villages: Avram Iancu, Cotu Miculinți, Coțușca, Crasnaleuca, Ghireni, Mihail Kogălniceanu, Nichiteni, Nicolae Bălcescu and Puțureni.

== Demographics ==
According to the census from 2002 there was a total population of 5,357 people living in this commune. Of this population, 99.94% are ethnic Romanians, 0.03% ethnic Hungarians and 0.01% ethnic Ukrainians.

== Natives ==
- Victor Găureanu
- Constantin Simirad
