= CSM Flacăra Moreni =

Romanian football club

Flacăra Moreni
- Full name: Club Sportiv Municipal; Flacăra Moreni
- Nicknames: Lupii de pe Cricov (The Wolves from the Cricov River); Galben-Albaștrii (The Yellow and Blues); Morenarii (The Moreni People)
- Short name: Flacăra
- Founded: 1922; 104 years ago as Astra-Română Moreni
- Ground: Flacăra
- Capacity: 10,000
- Owner: Moreni Municipality
- Chairman: Sergiu Nedelcu
- Manager: Cristinel Țermure
- League: Liga III
- 2025–26: Liga III, Seria II, 3rd
- Website: https://flacaramoreni.com/
Home colours	Away colours

Club Sportiv Municipal Flacăra Moreni, (Romanian pronunciation: [ˈflakəra moˈrenʲ]), commonly known as Flacăra Moreni or simply as Flacăra, is a Romanian football club based in Moreni, Dâmbovița County currently playing in the Liga III.

The team was founded by English and Dutch engineers from the local oil rig as Astra-Română Moreni in 1922. During the communist period, Flacăra was taken over by the Securitate with the involvement of director Tudor Postelnicu, who had previously worked as an iron lathe operator in the city.

In the 1988–89 season, the club finished fourth in the top flight and earned a place in the UEFA Cup. Flacăra lost 1–4 to Porto on aggregate in the first round, and at the end of that campaign was relegated as a result of the fall of communism. It has since only played in the lower leagues.

== History ==
The club was founded in 1922 by English and Dutch engineers from the local oil rig of Astra Română refinery under the name of Astra Română Moreni to encourage the workers and employees to practice sports. In 1950 changed its name to Partizanul Moreni as in 1951 to Flacăra Moreni.

After a merger with the local rival Automecanica Moreni in the year 1977 it was called Flacăra Automecanica Moreni, but in 1985 changed again to Flacăra Moreni.

Flacăra Moreni mostly played in the Divizia B and the Divizia C, but in the year 1986 they were promoted to Divizia A. In the 1988–89 season they finished in 4th place. This meant qualification in the following season for the UEFA Cup, in which Flacăra Moreni in the first round was eliminated against FC Porto 4–1 on aggregate.

In the 1990–91 season, Flacăra were relegated from Divizia A. After the relegation from the Divizia B in 1995 and from Divizia C in 2007 Flacăra played in the Liga IV. Flacăra were promoted to the Liga III for the 2016–17 season.

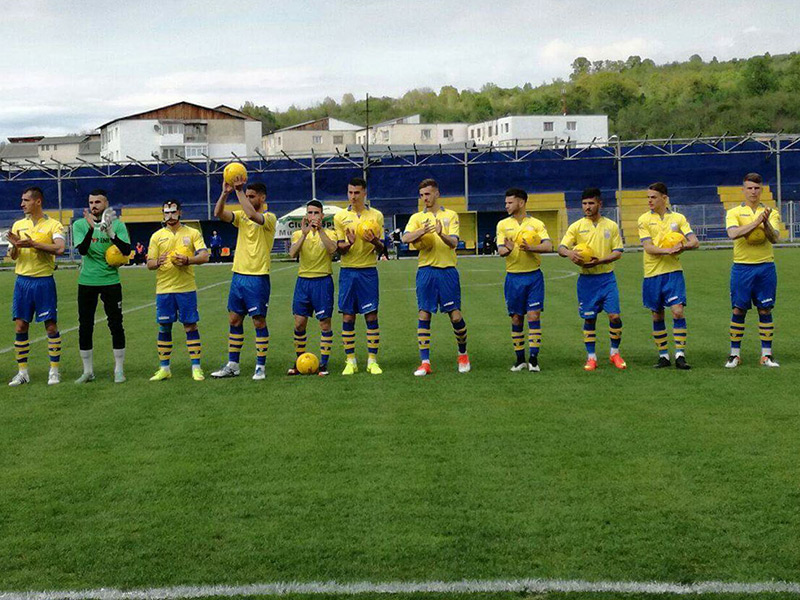
Flacăra Moreni in 2017

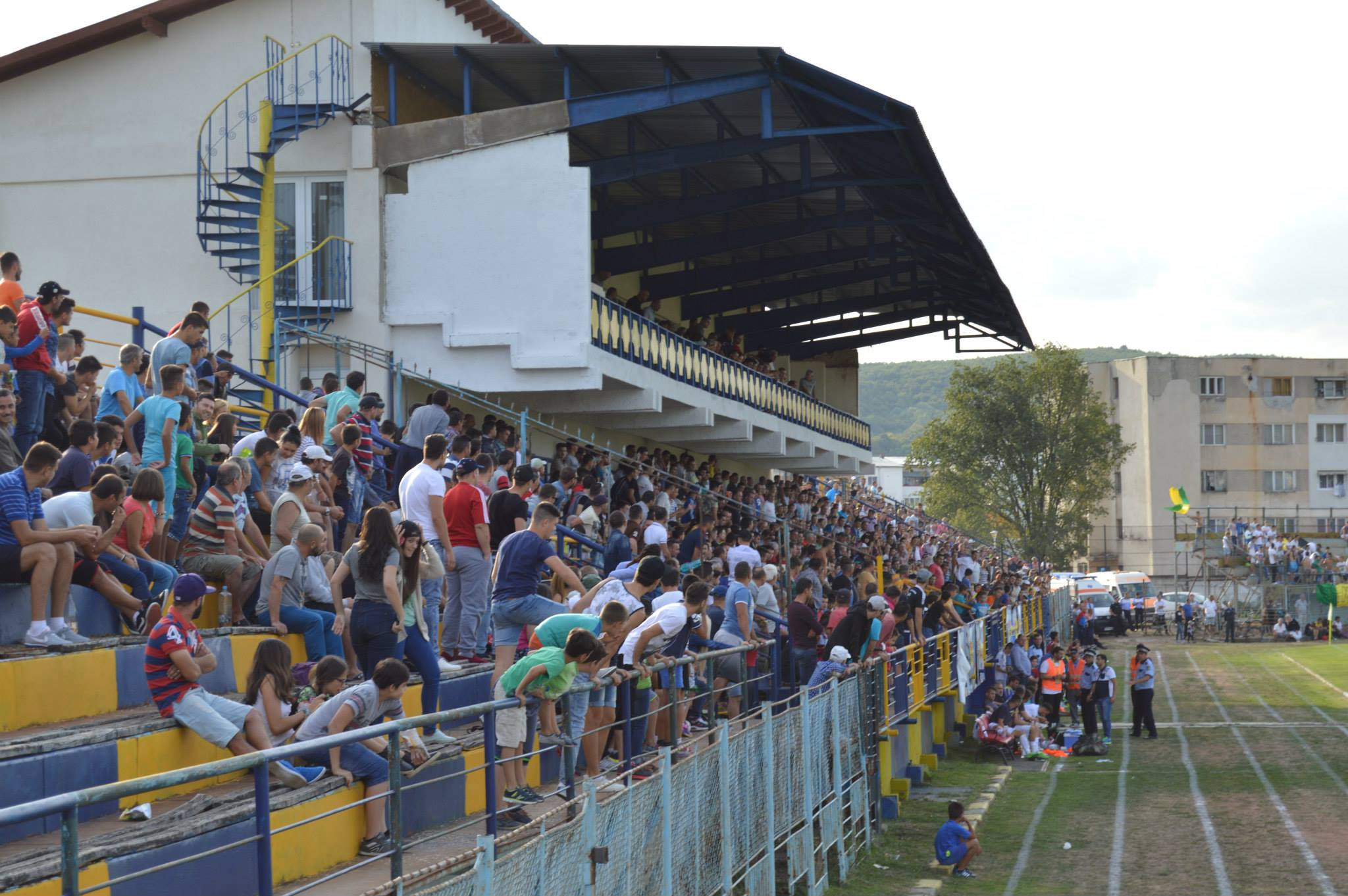
Flacăra Moreni supporters during the 2016 promotion match against Voința Crevedia.

== Chronology of names ==
Name	Period
Astra Română Moreni	1922–1950
Partizanul Moreni	1950
Flacăra Moreni	1951–1975
Flacăra-Automecanica Moreni	1975–1985
Flacăra Moreni	1985–present

== Honours ==
=== Leagues ===
Liga I

- Best Finish 4th 1988–89

Liga II

- Winners (1): 1985–86
- Runners-up (1): 1951

Liga III

- Winners (6): 1946–47, 1971–72, 1972–73, 1975–76, 1978–79, 1983–84
- Runners-up (2): 1977–78, 2000–01

Liga IV – Dâmbovița County

- Winners (1): 2015–16
- Runners-up (3): 2012–13, 2013–14, 2014–15

=== Cups ===
Cupa României – Dâmbovița County

- Winners (1): 2014–15

=== European ===
UEFA Cup

- First round: 1989–90

== Flacăra Moreni in Europe ==
Season	Round	Club	Home	Away	Aggregate
1989–90 UEFA Cup	First Round	(Portugal) FC Porto	1–2	0–2	1–4

== Players ==
=== First team squad ===
As of 10 September 2024

Note: Flags indicate national team as defined under FIFA eligibility rules; some limited exceptions apply. Players may hold more than one non-FIFA nationality.

No.	Pos.	Nation	Player
1	GK	ROU	Flavius Budoiu
2	DF	ROU	Alexandru Dobre
3	DF	ROU	Dragoș Cernea (Captain)
5	DF	ROU	Ionuț Angheluță
6	MF	ROU	David Ghebos
8	MF	ROU	George Stan
9	FW	ROU	Bogdan Oancea
10	MF	ROU	Iulian Drăgan
11	MF	ROU	Gabriel Negrea (Vice-Captain)
12	GK	ROU	Denis Duță
13	FW	ROU	Marius Vasile

No.	Pos.	Nation	Player
15	FW	ROU	Claudiu Niculăescu
16	MF	ROU	Bogdan Negrea
17	MF	ROU	Adrian Terec
18	DF	ROU	Marian Niță
19	DF	ROU	Gabriel Prundaru
20	DF	ROU	Alexandru Oaie
21	MF	ROU	Andrei Neagu
23	MF	ROU	Richard Țilică
25	MF	ROU	Alexandru Cristescu
26	DF	ROU	Antonio Ristea
30	GK	ROU	Andrei Crăciun

=== Out on loan ===
Note: Flags indicate national team as defined under FIFA eligibility rules; some limited exceptions apply. Players may hold more than one non-FIFA nationality.

No. / Pos. / Nation / Player	No. / Pos. / Nation / Player

== Club officials ==
=== Board of directors ===
Role	Name
Owner	(Romania) Moreni Municipality
President	(Romania) Sergiu Nedelcu
Sporting director	(Romania) Augustin Voinea
Delegate	(Romania) Vasile Petre

=== Current technical staff ===
Role	Name
Manager	(Romania) Cristinel Țermure
Assistant coaches	(Romania) George Preda (Romania) Vasile Bârdeș
Goalkeeping coach	(Romania) Alexandru Păsărică
Club Doctor	(Romania) Manuela Popescu

== League history ==
Season	Tier	Division	Place	Cupa României
2025–26	3	Liga III (Seria IV)	TBD	
2024–25	3	Liga III (Seria V)	9th	
2023–24	3	Liga III (Seria IV)	6th	
2022–23	3	Liga III (Seria IV)	3rd	
2021–22	3	Liga III (Seria IV)	6th	
2020–21	3	Liga III (Seria VI)	7th	
2019–20	3	Liga III (Seria III)	3rd	
2018–19	3	Liga III (Seria III)	11th	
2017–18	3	Liga III (Seria III)	6th	
2016–17	3	Liga III (Seria III)	5th	
2015–16	4	Liga IV (DB)	1st (C, P)	
2014–15	4	Liga IV (DB)	2nd	
2013–14	4	Liga IV (DB)	2nd	
2006–07	3	Liga III (Seria III)	17th (R)	
2005–06	3	Divizia C (Seria IV)	7th	
2004–05	3	Divizia C (Seria IV)	10th	

Season	Tier	Division	Place	Cupa României
2003–04	3	Divizia C (Seria IV)	10th	
2002–03	3	Divizia C (Seria IV)	5th	
2001–02	3	Divizia C (Seria II)	8th	
2000–01	3	Divizia C (Seria IV)	2nd	
1999–00	3	Divizia C (Seria III)	4th	
1998–99	3	Divizia C (Seria III)	18th	
1997–98	3	Divizia C (Seria II)	6th	
1996–97	3	Divizia C (Seria II)	13th	
1995–96	3	Divizia C (Seria II)	9th	
1994–95	2	Divizia B (Seria I)	15th (R)	
1993–94	2	Divizia B (Seria I)	9th	
1992–93	2	Divizia B (Seria I)	4th	
1991–92	2	Divizia B (Seria I)	8th	
1990–91	2	Divizia B (Seria II)	8th	
1989–90	1	Divizia A	16th (R)	Round of 32
1988–89	1	Divizia A	4th	Round of 16

== Notable players ==
- (Romania) Alexandru Badea
- (Romania) Ion Balaur
- (Romania) Teodor Beldie
- (Romania) Florin Bîțică
- (Romania) Iulian Chiriță
- (Romania) Marin Daniel
- (Romania) Marin Dragnea
- (Romania) Gheorghe Dumitrașcu
- (Romania) Dudu Georgescu
- (Romania) Victor Glăvan
- (Romania) Gigi Gorga
- (Romania) Constantin Lala
- (Romania) Ioan Marcu
- (Romania) Dragoș Marasoiu
- (Romania) Ion Mateescu
- (Romania) Iulian Mihăescu
- (Romania) Ion Moldovan
- (Romania) Lică Movilă
- (Romania) Costel Pană
- (Romania) Marian Pană
- (Romania) Gabriel Paraschiv
- (Romania) Beniamin Popescu
- (Romania) George Preda
- (Romania) Dorel Purdea
- (Romania) Daniel Sava
- (Romania) Marian Savu
- (Romania) Nelu Stănescu
- (Romania) Florin Tene
- (Romania) George Timiș
- (Romania) Marcel Tirchinechi
- (Romania) Daniel Tudor
- (Romania) Nistor Văidean
- (Romania) Petre Vasile
- (Romania) Adrian Velicioiu
- (Romania) Gheorghe Viscreanu
- (Romania) Nicolae Viorel

== Former managers ==
- (Romania) Ștefan Wetzer (1948–1949)
- (Greece) (Romania) Kostas Choumis (1955)
- (Romania) Gheorghe Petrescu (1956–1960)
- (Romania) Constantin Marinescu (1962–1964)
- (Romania) Iosif Lengheriu (1971–1973)
- (Romania) Nicolae Tătaru (1977–1980)
- (Romania) Traian Ivănescu (1985–1986)
- (Romania) Alexandru Moldovan (1986)
- (Romania) Ion Nunweiller (1986–1989)
- (Romania) Spiridon Niculescu (1990)
- (Romania) Mircea Dridea (1990–1991)
- (Romania) Marin Ion (1991–1992)
- (Romania) Constantin Moldoveanu (1994–1995)
