= Moreni =

- Municipality
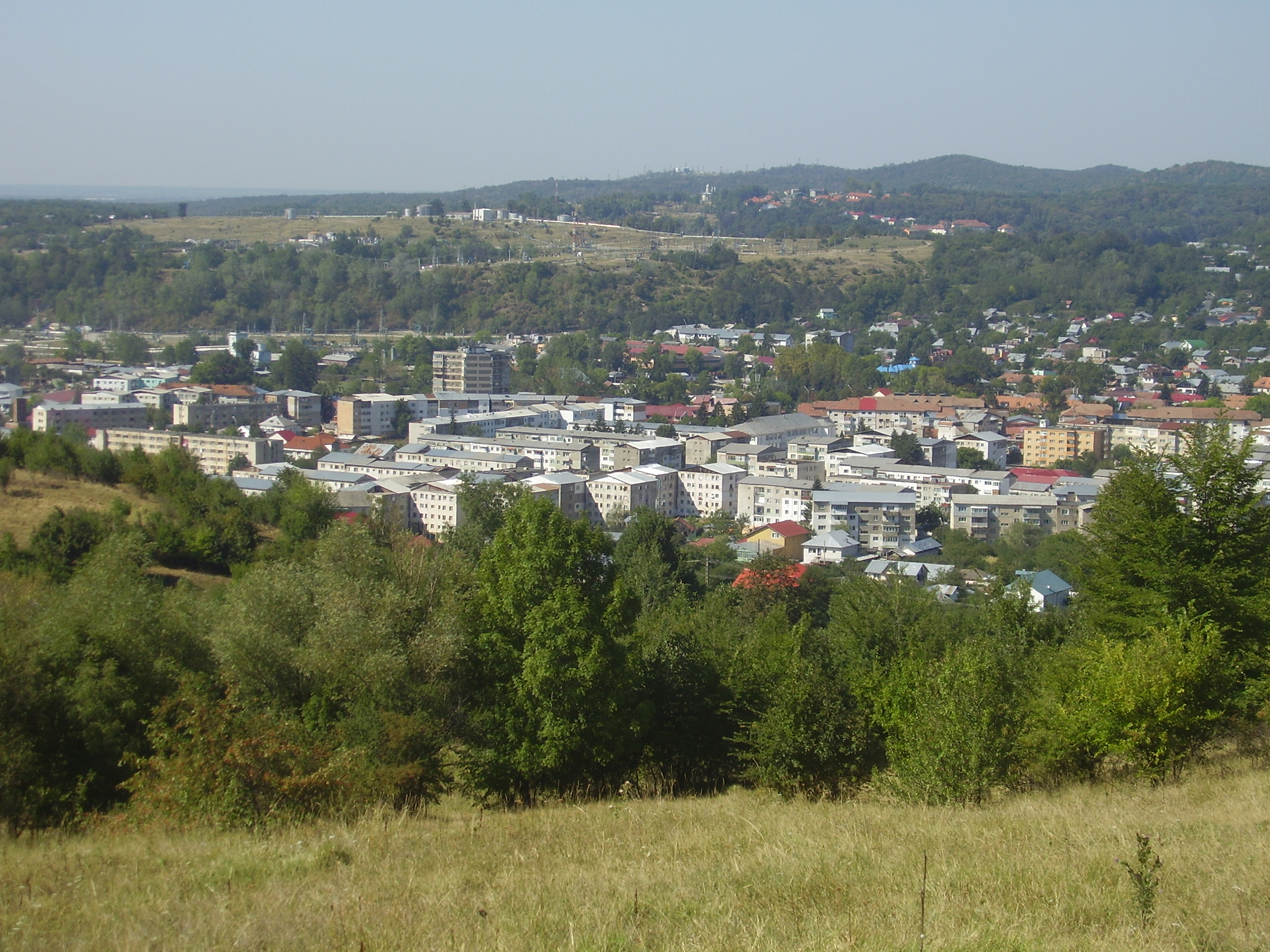

- Coat of arms

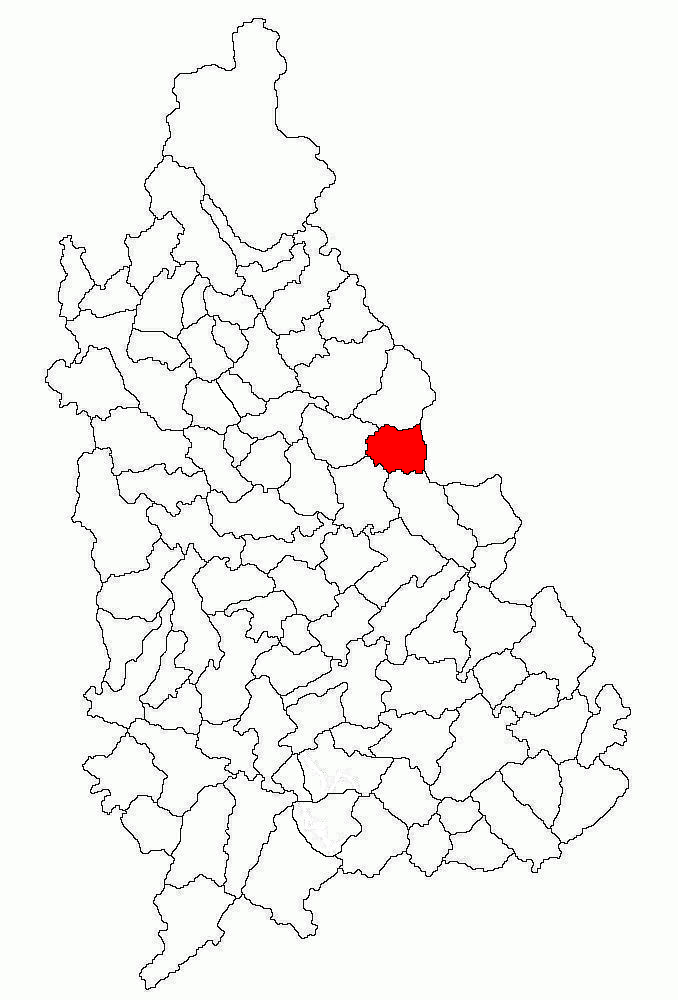
- Location in Dâmbovița County

- Location in Romania
- Coordinates: 44°58′49″N 25°38′40″E
- Country: Romania
- County: Dâmbovița

Government
  - Mayor (2024–2028): Gabriel Purcaru (PSD)
- Area: 35.14 km^{2} (13.57 sq mi)
- Elevation: 240 m (790 ft)
- Population (2021-12-01): 15,472
  - Density: 440.3/km^{2} (1,140/sq mi)
- Time zone: UTC+02:00 (EET)
  - Summer (DST): UTC+03:00 (EEST)
- Postal code: 135300
- Area code: +(40) 245
- Vehicle reg.: DB
- Website: primariamoreni.ro

Moreni (Romanian pronunciation: [moˈrenʲ]) is a municipality in Dâmbovița County, Muntenia, Romania, with a population of 15,472 as of 2021. The city is in the eastern part of the county, on the border with Prahova County. It is located 22 km (14 mi) east of the county seat, Târgoviște, and about 100 km (62 mi) north-west of Bucharest.

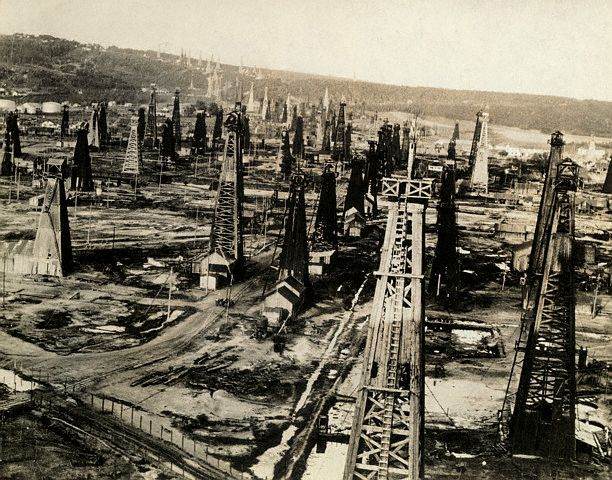
Petroleum field at Moreni in the 1920s

== History ==
Historical population
Year	Pop.	±%
1948	9,046	—
1956	11,687	+29.2%
1966	11,659	−0.2%
1977	17,737	+52.1%
1992	22,886	+29.0%
2002	22,868	−0.1%
2011	18,687	−18.3%
2021	15,472	−17.2%
Source: Census data

In 1861, Moreni became the first place in Romania (and third in the world) where oil was extracted.

Recently, an industrial park was built by the local authorities to encourage investment in the area.

== Natives ==
- Gheorghe Barbu (1968–2021), footballer
- Alberto Călin (born 2005), footballer
- Constantin Herold (1912–1984), multi-sport athlete, basketball player and coach
- Andrei Ivan (born 1997), footballer
- Ralph S. Locher (1915–2004), American politician, mayor of Cleveland, Ohio
- George Mihăiță (born 1948), actor and director
- Ștefan Niculescu (1927–2008), composer
- Costel Pană (born 1967), football manager and former player
- Marian Pană (born 1968), football manager and former player
- Gabriel Paraschiv (born 1978), football manager and former player
- Ovidiu Schumacher (born 1942), actor
- Ionuț Zaharia (born 2003), footballer

== Sports ==
The town is home to the Flacăra Moreni football club, which was founded by English and Dutch engineers from the local oil rig as Astra-Română Moreni in 1922. The home ground of the football team is the Flacăra Stadium, which holds 10,000 people.
