= Sorin Răducanu =

Romanian footballer (born 1962)

Personal information
- Date of birth: 25 August 1962 (age 64)
- Place of birth: Bucharest, Romania
- Position: Forward

Senior career*
Years	Team	Apps	(Gls)
1980–1981	Victoria București		
1982–1984	Gloria Reșița		
1984–1985	Dinamo București	16	(3)
1986	Olt Scornicești		
1986–1987	FCM Brașov	25	(10)
1987–1989	Sportul Studențesc	60	(23)
1990–1991	Dinamo București	16	(1)
1991–1992	Aris Limassol		
1993–1998	Wuppertaler SV		
Total		117	(37)

Managerial career
- Wuppertaler SV (youth)
- * Club domestic league appearances and goals

Sorin Răducanu (born 25 August 1962 in Bucharest) is a Romanian former footballer who played as a forward.

== Playing career ==
Răducanu was born on 25 August 1962 in Bucharest, Romania and began playing football in 1980 at Victoria București. In 1982, he joined Gloria Reșița for a two-year spell. Subsequently, Răducanu moved to Dinamo București, making his Divizia A debut on 3 March 1985 under coach Cornel Dinu in a 1–0 victory against ASA Târgu Mureș in which he scored the goal. He also debuted in European competitions by playing in a 2–1 win over Vardar in the first round of the 1985–86 UEFA Cup. Although defection from the Socialist Republic of Romania was illegal at the time, Răducanu chose to remain in Italy after one of Dinamo's friendly tournaments. He subsequently moved to West Germany, yet he willingly returned to Romania after three and a half months. In 1986, he was sent by Dinamo to Olt Scornicești. For the 1986–87 season, Răducanu played for FCM Brașov, scoring 10 goals in 25 league matches. In 1987, he went to play for Sportul Studențesc. During the 1987–88 UEFA Cup campaign, he played three matches to help them get past Peter Schmeichel and Brian Laudrup's Brøndby, winning the second leg 3–0 after an away loss by the same score, securing a historic penalty shootout qualification to the third round where they were defeated by Hellas Verona. In the 1988–89 season, he scored a career-best 11 league goals for Sportul. Răducanu returned to Dinamo in 1990. He played three games during the 1990–91 European Cup, helping the team get past St Patrick's Athletic, but they were defeated by Porto in the following round. He accumulated a total of 117 matches with 37 goals in Divizia A. In 1991, Răducanu had his first experience playing abroad by signing with Cypriot club Aris Limassol. Afterwards, he played for Wuppertaler SV between 1993 and 1998, helping the club achieve promotion from the sixth tier of German football to the 2. Bundesliga. Following his retirement as a player, he remained at the club as a coach to manage several youth squads.

== Administrative career ==
In 2014, Răducanu submitted his candidacy for the position of president of the Romanian Football Federation. His candidacy was validated by the federation's Validation Committee, and he was one of the six candidates who contested the election held on 5 March 2014, which was eventually won by Răzvan Burleanu.
