= Alexandru Batcu =

Romanian general

- Born: June 27, 1892; Dorohoi, Botoșani County, Kingdom of Romania
- Died: 1964 (aged 71–72)
- Military career
- Allegiance: Kingdom of Romania
- Branch: Romanian Land Forces
- Rank: Brigadier general
- Commands: 28th Fortress Regiment; 5th Division; 5th Training Division
- Conflicts: World War II

Prefect of Dubăsari
- In office June 1, 1943 – February 1, 1944
- Prime Minister: Ion Antonescu

Prefect of Tiraspol
- In office February 1, 1944 – March 31, 1944
- Prime Minister: Ion Antonescu

Alexandru Batcu (27 June 1892 – 1964) was a Romanian brigadier general during World War II.

He was born in Dorohoi, Botoșani County, Kingdom of Romania. He was promoted to lieutenant-colonel in 1936 and colonel in 1940. From 1941 to 1943, Batcu served as commanding officer 28th Fortress Regiment. He was then Prefect of Dubăsari, Transnistria Governorate in 1943. In 1944, he began as Prefect of Tiraspol, then became general officer commanding 5th Division, and finally General Officer Commanding 5th Training Division. He was Assistant Commandant of Bucharest in 1944 and Commandant of Bucharest Garrison in 1945. He was promoted to brigadier general in April 1945, and he retired in January 1946. In 1948 he was sentenced by the communist authorities to 12 years in prison for bribery and abuse of power.
