= Marian Pană =

Romanian footballer

Personal information
- Date of birth: 24 December 1968 (age 57)
- Place of birth: Moreni, Romania
- Height: 1.72 m (5 ft 7 1/2 in)
- Position: Left back

Senior career*
| Years | Team | Apps | (Gls) |
| 1985–1988 | Flacăra Moreni | 34 | (1) |
| 1989 | Victoria București | 25 | (3) |
| 1990 | Flacăra Moreni | 13 | (0) |
| 1990–1991 | FC Argeș | 32 | (9) |
| 1991–1994 | Dinamo București | 65 | (3) |
| 1994–1995 | FC Argeș | 27 | (4) |
| 1995 | Hapoel Haifa | 8 | (0) |
| 1996 | Dinamo București | 4 | (1) |
| 1996–1997 | Chindia Târgoviște | 9 | (0) |
| 1997 | FC Brașov | 17 | (0) |
| 1998 | Rocar București | 5 | (0) |
| 1999 | FC Brașov | 0 | (0) |
| 1999–2000 | Chindia Târgoviște | 22 | (4) |
| 2000 | Juventus București | 5 | (0) |
| Total | | 266 | (25) |

International career
| 1991 | Romania | 2 | (0) |

Managerial career
- 2001–2002: Petrolul Târgoviște
- 2002–2006: CS Otopeni
- 2007–2008: Cetatea Suceava
- 2008: Știința Bacău
- 2009: Gloria Bistrița
- 2010: Dacia Mioveni
- 2010: Universitatea Cluj
- 2011: Unirea Urziceni
- 2011: Farul Constanța
- 2011–2012: CS Mioveni
- 2013: Bihor Oradea
- 2013–2014: Metalul Reșița
- 2014: Farul Constanța
- 2015: Metalul Reșița
- 2016-2021: VfB Hohenems (youth)
- 2020-2022: VfB Hohenems III
- 2022-2023: VfB Hohenems (youth)
- 2023-2024: VfB Hohenems II
- * Club domestic league appearances and goals

Marian Pană (born 24 December 1968, in Moreni) is a football manager and former professional footballer. He previously managed teams like Cetatea Suceava, Știința Bacău, Gloria Bistrița, Universitatea Cluj and Farul Constanța. As a player, he won the Liga I title with Dinamo București playing alongside his brother, the midfielder Costel who was also an International footballer.

== International career ==
Marian Pană played two friendly games against Egypt at international level for Romania, the first one was a 3–1 loss, the second ended 1–1.

== Honours ==
=== Player ===
Dinamo București

- Liga I: 1991–92

=== Manager ===
CS Otopeni

- Liga III: 2003–04

Cetatea Suceava

- Liga III: 2007–08
