= Flacăra Stadium (Moreni) =

Football stadium in Romania

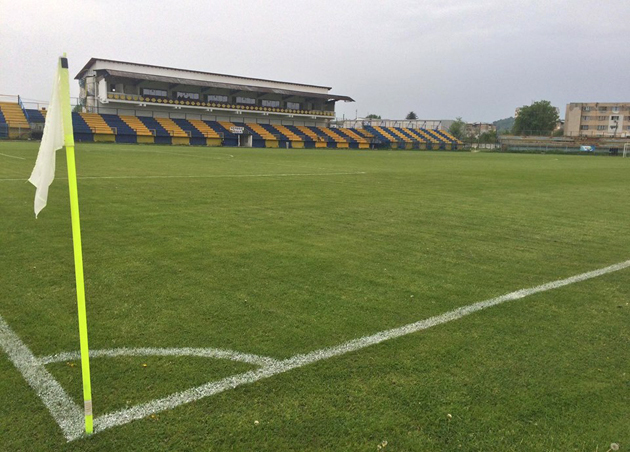
- Interactive map of Flacăra Stadium
- Address: Bld. Petrolului
- Location: Moreni, Romania
- Coordinates: 44°58′54″N 25°38′58″E
- Owner: Town of Moreni
- Operator: Flacăra Moreni
- Capacity: 10,000
- Surface: Grass

Construction
- Opened: 1922
- Renovated: 1973, 2015

Tenants
- Flacăra Moreni (1922–present); Petrolul Ploiești (2007)

The Flacăra Stadium is a multi-use stadium in Moreni, Romania. It is currently used mostly for football matches and is the home ground of the local football team Flacăra Moreni. It holds 10,000 people.

The stadium was built in 1922, renovated in 1973, then in the 1980s and again in 2015.
