= Dorohoi =

- Municipality
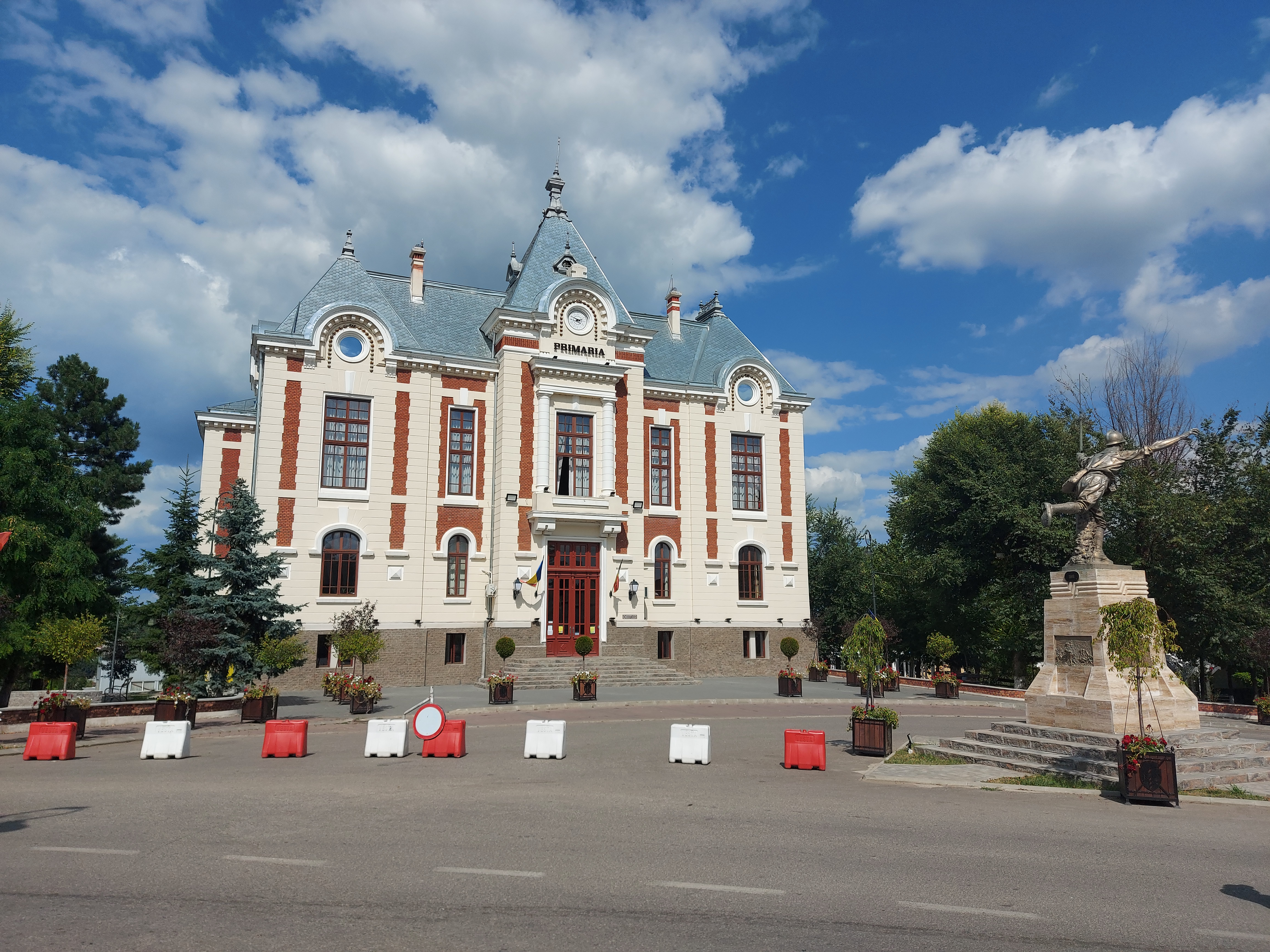
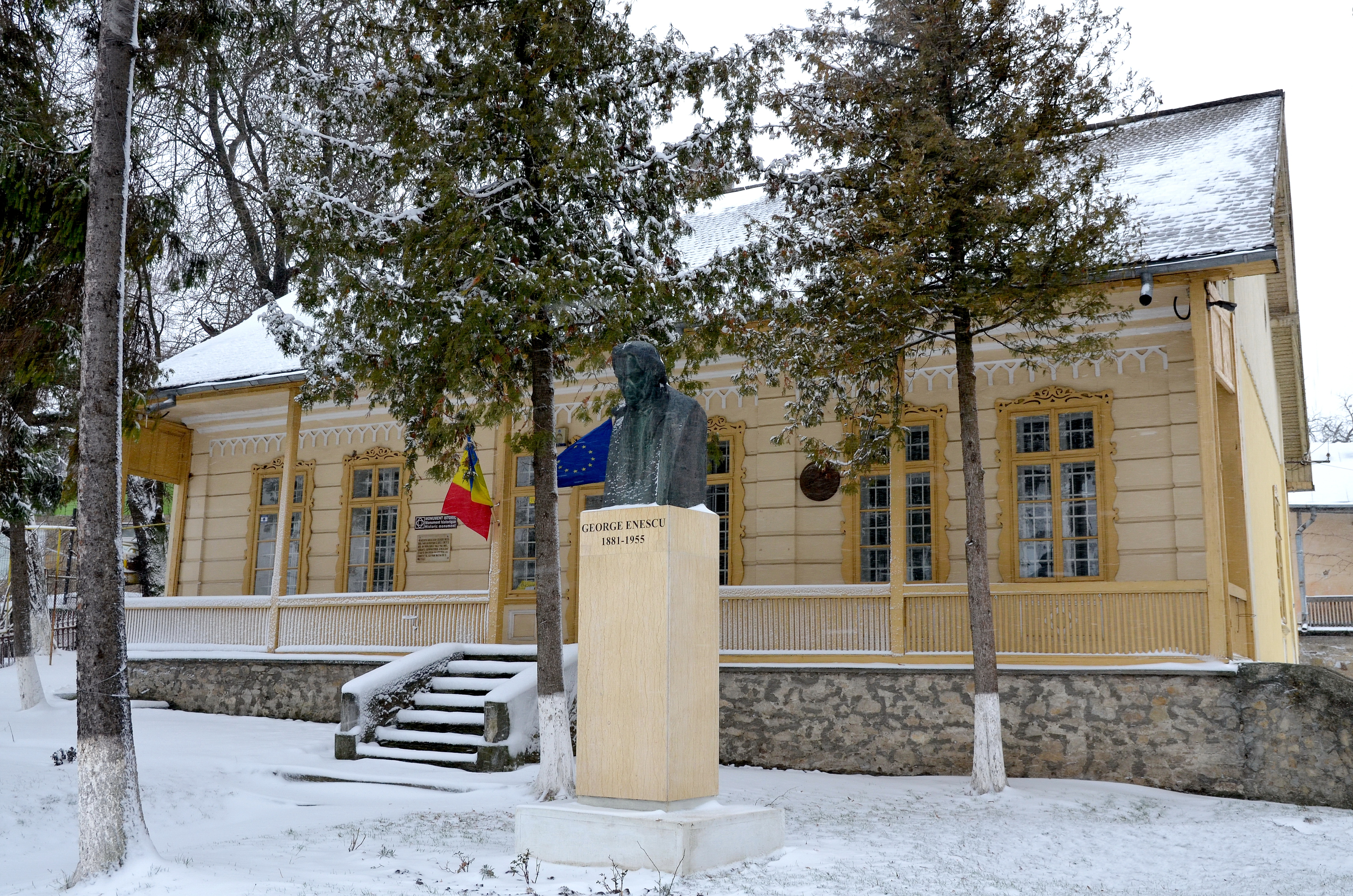
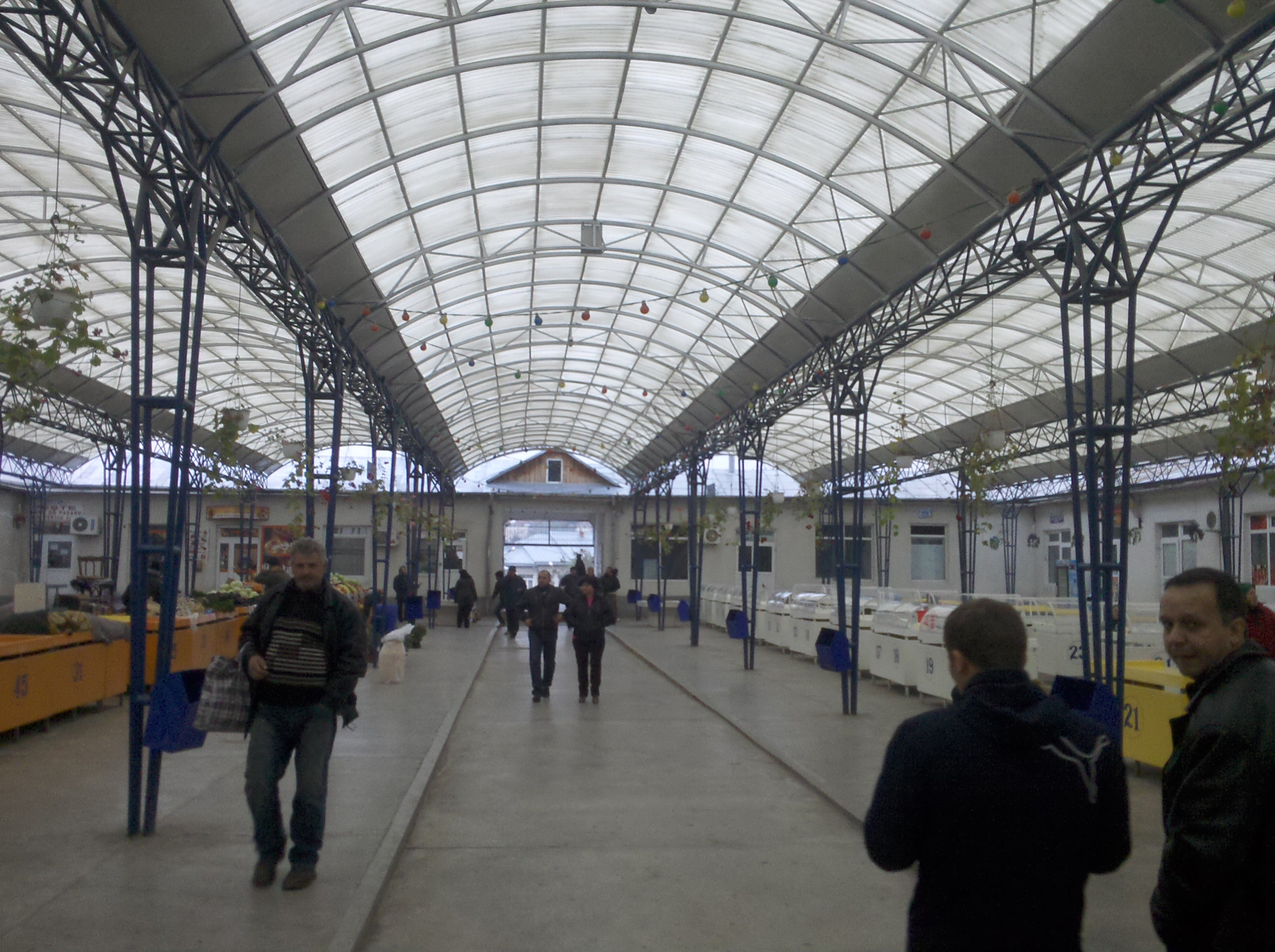
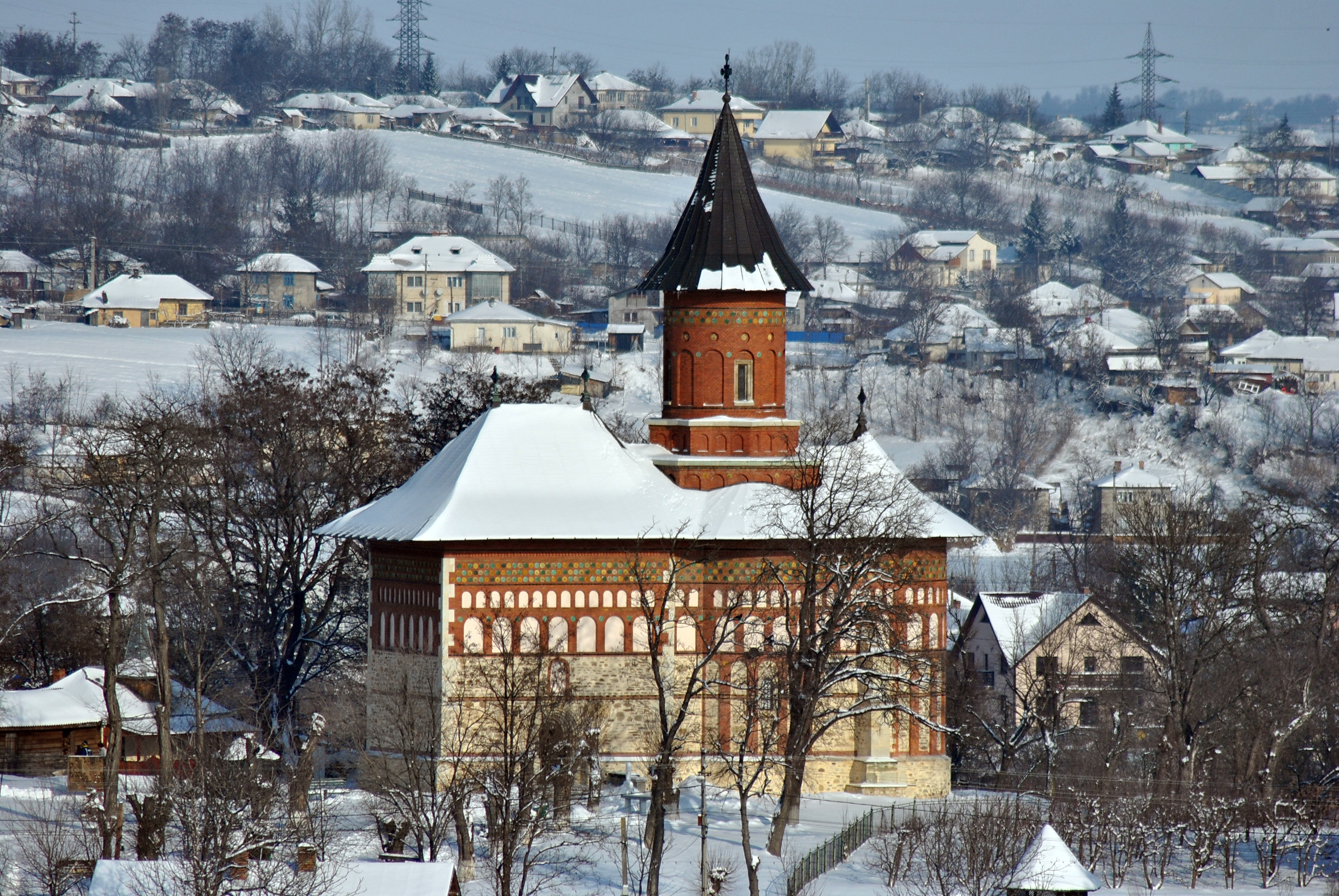
- Dorohoi City Hall George Enescu Memorial Museum Dorohoi Central Market Saint Nicholas Church

- Coat of arms

- Location in Botoșani County

- Location in Romania
- Coordinates: 47°57′N 26°24′E
- Country: Romania
- County: Botoșani

Government
  - Mayor (2024–2028): Dorin Alexandrescu (PSD)
- Area: 60.39 km^{2} (23.32 sq mi)
- Elevation: 170 m (560 ft)
- Population (2021-12-01): 22,893
  - Density: 379.1/km^{2} (981.8/sq mi)
- Time zone: UTC+02:00 (EET)
  - Summer (DST): UTC+03:00 (EEST)
- Postal code: 715200
- Area code: +40 x31
- Vehicle reg.: BT
- Website: primariadorohoi.ro

Dorohoi (Romanian pronunciation: [doroˈhoj]) is a city in Botoșani County, Romania, on the right bank of the river Jijia, which broadens into a lake on the north. The city administers three villages: Dealu Mare, Loturi Enescu, and Progresul.

== History ==
Dorohoi used to be a market for the timber and farm produce of the north Moldavian highlands; merchants from the neighboring states flocked to its great fair, held on the June 12. The settlement is first mentioned in documents from 1408, where a treaty was signed between Moldavian voievode, Alexandru cel Bun, and the King of Poland and Hungary.

Dorohoi was bombed by the Russians during World War I.

Dorohoi used to be the capital of Dorohoi County, but was downgraded to a municipality when the Soviet Union occupied Bessarabia and Northern Bukovina in late June 1940. On July 1, 1940, units of the Romanian Army attacked local Jews in a pogrom. These military actions against the Jews were not endorsed by the Romanian Government. When the conspiracy against the Jews was discovered by the military command, troops were sent to end the abuse.

== Geography ==
=== 2010 Romanian floods ===
The northeastern town of Dorohoi witnessed deaths during the night of June 28–29, 2010 as floods rose to just over 1 metre (3.3 ft) in some places. Several roads into Dorohoi remained either washed away or under water. The heavy rain that had been falling for close to a week had forecasters warning that it would continue in northeast Romania. The unusually heavy rain killed 6 people, most in the town of Dorohoi on the 29th.

== Demographics ==
Historical population
Year	Pop.	±%
1859	6,049	—
1900	12,701	+110.0%
1912	13,951	+9.8%
1930	15,866	+13.7%
1948	15,036	−5.2%
1956	14,771	−1.8%
1966	16,699	+13.1%
1977	22,161	+32.7%
1992	33,739	+52.2%
2002	31,073	−7.9%
2011	22,600	−27.3%
2021	22,893	+1.3%
Source: Census data

At the 2021 census, Dorohoi had a population of 22,893. At the census from 2011, the city had a population of 22,600, of which 98.13% were ethnic Romanians, 1.54% ethnic Romani, 0.07% ethnic Jews, and 0.02% ethnic Ukrainians.

=== Jews of Dorohoi ===
Jews first settled in Dorohoi in the 17th century. It was set up as a Jewish Guild under Moldavia. Jews suffered here during World War I:

- There were 600 Jewish families in Dorohoi in 1803.
- 3,031 people in 1859 (roughly half of the population).
- 6,804 in 1899 (more than half of the population).
- 5,800 in the 1930s.

For the entire Dorohoi County, most of which remained in Romania, though the Hertsa area became a part of the Soviet Union, 6,425 Jews survived the deportations to Transnistria in 1941, while 5,131 died. After the November 1941 deportations of Jews from Dorohoi County (9,367 Jews) and June 1942 (360 Jews), excluding the Jews from the Herta area that had been under Soviet occupation, 2,316 Jews were not deported. In November 1943, according to General Constantin Vasiliu, undersecretary of state for police and security in the Ministry of the Interior, if one includes the Jews deported from Dorohoi in 1942, but excluding the Hertsa area, 10,368 Jews were deported from the county, while if one includes the Jews of Hertsa, about 12,000 or more were deported.

The Jewish population actually increased after the Holocaust as a result of refugees settling there. In 1947, there were 7,600 Jews living in Dorohoi. Following the establishment of Israel, the Jewish population of Dorohoi steadily decreased, due to emigration. In 1956, there were 2,753 Jews; in 1966, there were 1,013; and by 2000, there were only 49 Jews left in Dorohoi.

=== Natives ===
- Benjamin Abrams (1893–1967), American businessman
- Vlad Dragoș Aicoboae (born 1993), rower
- Alexandru Batcu (1892–1964), brigadier general in World War II
- Ion Călugăru (1902–1956), novelist
- Dumitru Chipăruș (1886–1947), sculptor
- Alexandru Ciucur (born 1990), footballer
- Dan Condurache (born 1952), film actor
- Octavian Cotescu (1931–1985), film and theatre actor
- Sebastian Cozmâncă (born 1992), kickboxer
- Maurice Hartt (1895–1950), Canadian politician
- Theodor V. Ionescu (1899–1988), physicist
- Alexandre Istrati (1915–1991), painter
- Gheorghe Liliac (born 1959), footballer
- Camelia Lupașcu (born 1986), rower
- Alexandru Mavrodi (1881–1934), journalist
- Gheorghe Nichita (born 1956), politician
- Marcel Olinescu (1896–1992), engraver
- Iulia Oniță (1923–1987), sculptor
- Dan Pița (born 1938), film director and screenwriter
- Nicolae Samsonovici (1877–1950), general and Defense Minister
- Octavian Strunilă (born 1981), actor and film director
- Marius Șuleap (born 1979), footballer
- Păstorel Teodoreanu (1894–1964), humorist and poet

== Attractions ==
A little to the Eastern outer limits of the city, on the way to Broscăuți, tourists may find Saint Nicholas Church, an edifice built by Ștefan cel Mare in 1495. Exorcisms were officiated there until the late 2000s.
