= Ionuț Popa =

Romanian footballer and manager (1953–2020)

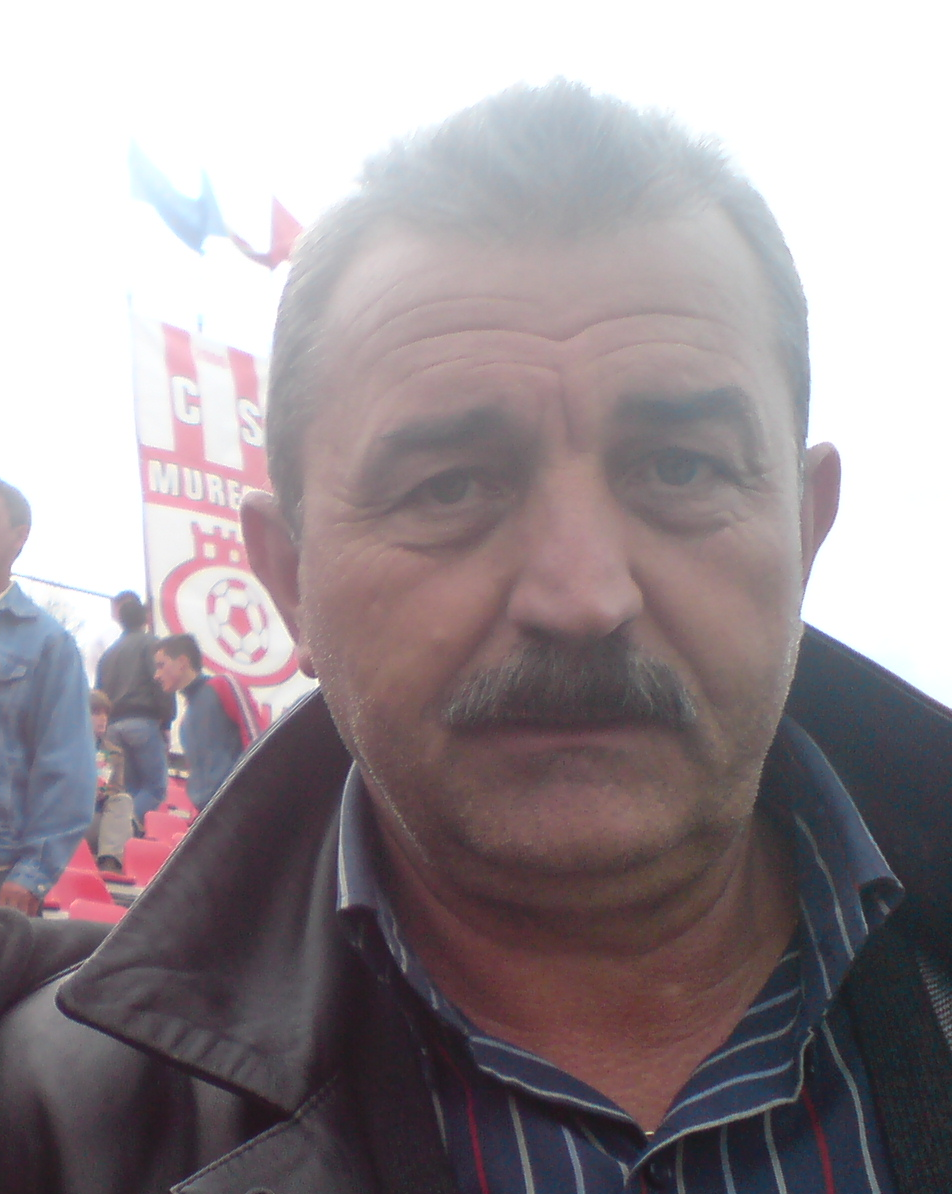
- Popa in 2011

Personal information
- Date of birth: 17 April 1953
- Place of birth: Săvârșin, Romania
- Date of death: 25 June 2020 (aged 67)
- Place of death: Arad, Romania

Youth career
- 1967–1971: Politehnica Timișoara

Senior career*
Years	Team	Apps	(Gls)
- Unirea Sânnicolau Mare
- Dacia Unirea Brăila
- Vagonul Arad
- Aurul Brad
1984–1987	Victoria Ineu		
1987–1988	Petrolul Arad		

Managerial career
- 1985–1987: Victoria Ineu
- 1987–1991: Petrolul Arad
- 1991–1993: Strungul Arad
- 1993: UTA Arad
- 1993–1995: Motorul Arad
- 1996–1997: Telecom Arad
- 1997–1998: UTA Arad
- 1998–1999: West Petrom Pecica
- 1999–2000: Indagrara Arad
- 2000–2002: UTA Arad
- 2002–2003: Bihor Oradea
- 2004: Jiul Petroșani
- 2004–2009: Politehnica Iași
- 2009–2010: UTA Arad
- 2010: Politehnica Iași
- 2010–2011: Mioveni
- 2011–2012: Politehnica Iași
- 2015–2016: Șoimii Pâncota
- 2016–2018: ACS Poli Timișoara
- 2018–2019: UTA Arad
- * Club domestic league appearances and goals

Ionuț Popa (17 April 1953 – 25 June 2020) was a Romanian professional footballer and manager. Popa managed teams such as UTA Arad, Bihor Oradea, Politehnica Iași and ACS Poli Timișoara, among others.

== Managerial career ==
Popa was the coach of Liga I team Politehnica Iași from 2004, when they were promoted to the top league, until January 2009, becoming one of the longest serving coaches in Liga I. He quit his job due to a lack of funds. He was soon replaced by Cristiano Bergodi.

== Honours ==
UTA Arad

- Divizia B: 2001–02

Politehnica Iași

- Divizia B: 2011–12
