= Costel Pană =

Romanian footballer

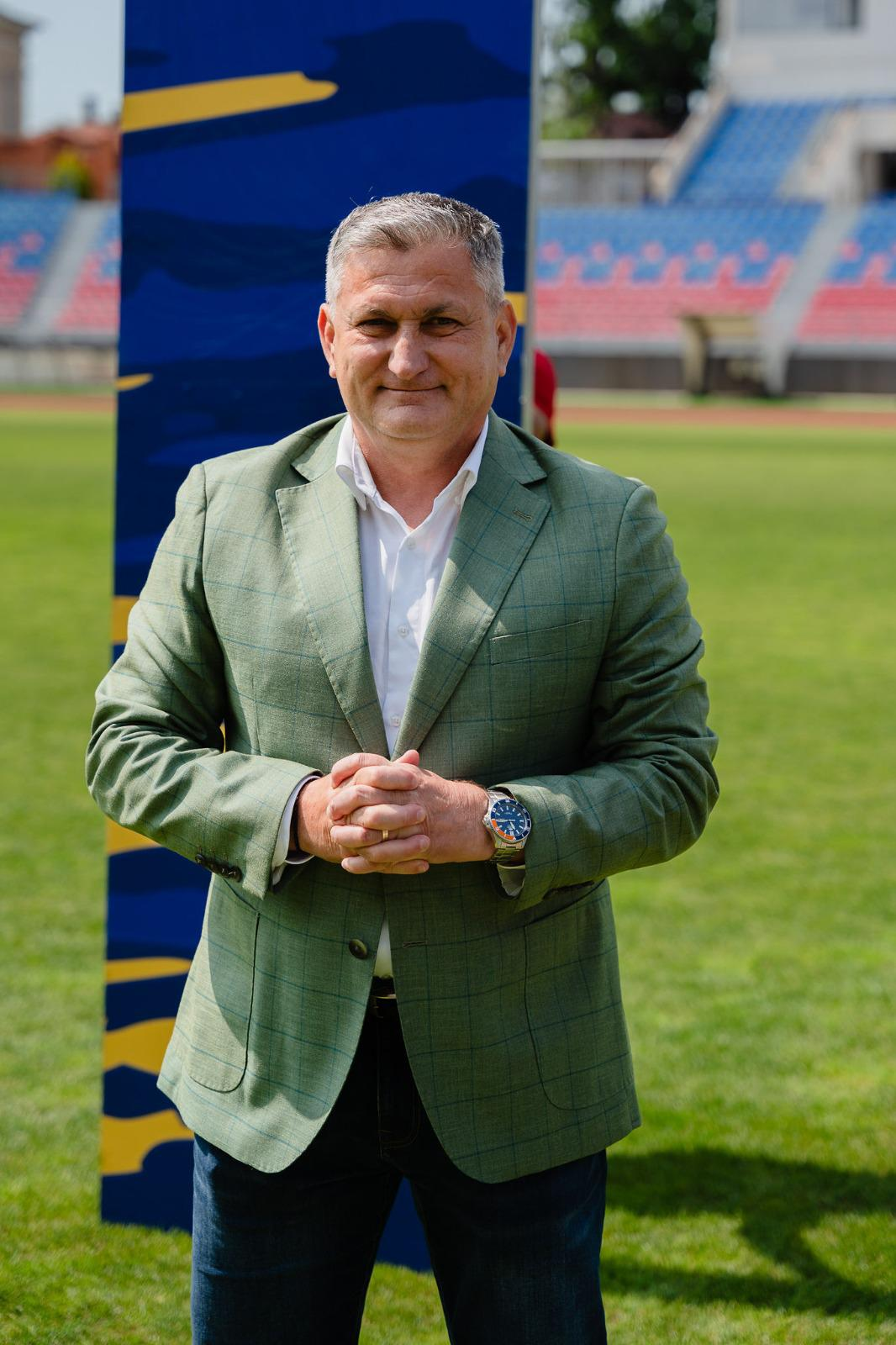

Personal information
- Full name: Constantin Pană
- Date of birth: 15 July 1967 (age 59)
- Place of birth: Moreni, Romania
- Height: 1.68 m (5 ft 6 in)
- Position: Midfielder

Youth career
- 1976–1984: Flacăra Moreni

Senior career*
Years	Team	Apps	(Gls)
1984–1990	Flacăra Moreni	107	(17)
1990–1995	Dinamo București	128	(22)
1995–1997	Neuchâtel Xamax	47	(2)
1997–1999	FCM Bacău	14	(3)
1999	Argeș Pitești	11	(2)
2000	FC Brașov	10	(1)
Total		317	(47)

International career
1992–1993	Romania	6	(1)

Managerial career
- 1999: FCM Bacău (caretaker)
- 2000–2003: Argeș Pitești (assistant)
- 2003: UTA Arad (assistant)
- 2004–2006: Romania U18
- 2006–2007: CSM Râmnicu Vâlcea
- 2007–2009: Al-Hilal (assistant)
- 2010–2011: Chindia Târgoviște
- 2011–2012: CS Ștefănești
- 2012: CS Buftea
- 2012–2013: Progresul Cernica
- 2014: Viitorul Axintele
- 2015–2016: Universitatea Cluj (assistant)
- 2017–2018: Al-Ahli U19
- 2018–2019: Al-Shabab U19
- 2019–2020: Politehnica Iași (assistant)
- 2021: Al-Tai U19
- 2021–2022: Al-Khaleej (technical director youth center)
- 2022–2024: Al-Khaleej (sporting director)
- 2024: Agricola Borcea
- 2025: Chindia Târgoviște
- * Club domestic league appearances and goals

Constantin "Costel" Pană (born 15 July 1967) is a Romanian professional football manager and former player.

== International career ==
Pană played six games at international level for Romania, making his debut in a 1994 World Cup qualification match which ended with a 7–0 victory against Faroe Islands, in which he scored the 6th goal of the game.

== Personal life ==
Pană won the Divizia A title with Dinamo București playing alongside his brother, the defender Marian who was also an international footballer.

== Playing statistics ==
Appearances and goals by national team and year
National team	Year	Apps	Goals
Romania	1992	1	1
Romania	1993	5	0
Total		6	1

Scores and results list Romania's goal tally first, score column indicates score after each Pană goal.

Goal	Date	Venue	Opponent	Score	Result	Competition
1.	6 May 1992	Stadionul Steaua, Bucharest, Romania	Faroe Islands	6–0	7–0	1994 World Cup qualifiers

== Honours ==
=== Player ===
Flacăra Moreni

- Divizia B: 1985–86

Dinamo București

- Divizia A: 1991–92

=== Coach ===
Chindia Târgoviște

- Liga III: 2010–11
