= FC Politehnica Iași (1945) =

Association football club in Romania

Politehnica Iași
- Full name: Fotbal Club Politehnica Iași
- Nicknames: Trupa din Copou (Copou Squad); Alb-albaștrii (The White and Blues)
- Founded: 27 April 1945
- Dissolved: 2010
- Ground: Emil Alexandrescu
- Capacity: 11,390
Home colours	Away colours

Fotbal Club Politehnica Iași (Romanian pronunciation: [po.liˈteh.nika ˈjaʃʲ]), commonly known as Politehnica Iași or simply Poli Iași, was a Romanian football club from the city of Iași, Iași County.

Founded in 1945, the team alternated between Romania’s first and second leagues, playing in Liga I for twenty-eight seasons between 1960 and 2010. Its home ground was Emil Alexandrescu Stadium, where it played in blue and white until being dissolved in 2010. In the same year, a successor club was formed under the name ACSMU Politehnica Iași.

== History ==
The club was established on 27 April 1945 as Sportul Studențesc Iași by a group of students from the Gheorghe Asachi Technical University of Iași, and received the name Politehnica one month later (Asociația Sportivă Politehnica Iași). It alternated between Romania’s second and first leagues, playing in the Romanian top flight during the 1960–61, 1962–1967 (under the name CSMS Iași), 1968–1972, 1973–1981, 1982–1990, and 1995–96 periods.

Facing financial difficulties, Politehnica Iași suffered its first relegation to the third tier after the 2000–01 season, finishing bottom of Series I with only 9 points.

In 2001, the club merged with another Iași-based side from Divizia C, Unirea 2000, and the new entity was renamed Poli Unirea Iași. Under head coach Adrian Kereszy, assisted by Gelu Paveliuc, and with Vasile Simionaș serving as technical director from January 2002, the team went on to win Series I in the 2001–02 season, finishing 25 points clear of the 2nd- and 3rd-placed teams, Botoșani and Rafinăria Dărmănești, securing promotion back to Divizia B after just one year.

Politehnica started the 2004–05 season by winning only two points in eight rounds. After manager Vasile Simionaș was replaced with Ionuț Popa, Politehnica won the following fixture away against Steaua București, Adrian Cristea scoring the only goal of the match. The team gradually lifted itself from the bottom of the table, finally finishing 9th with 38 points.

In the Romanian Cup they were eliminated in the first round (sixteen-finals) by UTA Arad with 1–0.

=== Recent history ===
2005–06 season

The 2005–06 season was a relatively good one for the Iași-based team, whose objective was to avoid relegation. They narrowly lost both matches against the future champions Steaua and the away match with runners-up Rapid București, all with the score of 1–0, after three penalty kicks. They also lost 2–0 against Dinamo București at home. However, they drew away against a weakened Dinamo team, after a second-half goal by Daniel Rednic. Politehnica Iași eventually finished 10th with 39 points.

In the Romanian Cup they reached the quarter-finals, eliminating Unirea Dej (2–0) and FC Vaslui (2–1 AET) in the progress. They were eliminated by Rapid after a last-minute goal and after the referee disallowed a controversial goal scored in the second half by Politehnica.

During the season Politehnica experienced major financial problems, which resulted in the impossibility to buy better players for the team and difficulties encountered in receiving the club license necessary for playing in the 2006/07 season in Liga I. The license was finally obtained after the efforts made by chairman and mayor of Iași Gheorghe Nichita.

2006–07 season

Politehnica Iași started the season with the same financial problems, resulting in only four players joining the team in the pre-season break and many salaries and debts paid late. In addition, the conflict between Gheorghe Nichita and Iași prefect Radu Prisăcaru concerning public funding of the club and interference by the press spiced up the atmosphere. Despite all odds, Politehnica kept itself between the top six teams after the first 12 matches and was unbeaten for eight consecutive matches (seven in Liga I and one cup match), drawing at home with Steaua (1–1), Rapid and FCU Politehnica Timișoara (0–0). A negative run followed with one point in seven league matches and was followed by a 4–0 away victory against local rivals Ceahlăul Piatra Neamț. Politehnica finally finished 13th with 40 points.

The team qualified for the second time in a row in the quarter-finals of the Romanian Cup, disposing of Universitatea Cluj (2–1) and Farul Constanța (1–0), however, they were eliminated by Poli Timișoara, score 1–2.

2009–10 season

The club relegated from the Liga I at the end of the season.

=== Dissolution ===
After it relegated in 2010, the club became bankrupt because of debts that were accumulated during the years.

The football tradition in Iași has been continued by Politehnica Iași (2010), which regard themselves as the continuation of the original team. In 2018, they earned the right to use the logo and name of FC Politehnica.

== Honours ==
- Liga II
  - Winners (6): 1959–60, 1961–62, 1967–68, 1972–73, 1981–82, 2003–04
  - Runners-up (4): 1985–86, 1986–87, 1987–88, 1993–94
- Liga III
  - Winners (1): 2001–02

== Rivalries with other clubs ==
Politehnica Iași had a rivalry with FC Vaslui and Oțelul Galați.

== Former managers ==
- (Romania) Mircea David (1952–1960)
- (Romania) Ion Unguroiu (1960–1961)
- (Romania) Traian Iordache (1962–1963)
- (Romania) Constantin Teașcă (1963–1965)
- (Romania) Augustin Botescu (1965–1967)
- (Romania) Ion Zaharia (1967–1968)
- (Romania) Șerban Iustin (1968–1970)
- (Romania) Vintilă Mărdărescu (1970–1972)
- (Romania) Ilie Oană (1973–1977)
- (Romania) Leonida Antohi (1977–1981)
- (Romania) Gheorghe Constantin (1981–1982)
- (Romania) Ioan Marica (1982–1983)
- (Romania) Ion Motroc (1982–1983)
- (Romania) Ioan Marica (1983–1984)
- (Romania) Vasile Ianul (1983–1984)
- (Romania) Vasile Simionaș (1983–1984)
- (Romania) Constantin Oțet (1984–1985)
- (Romania) Vasile Simionaș (1984–1985)
- (Romania) Dumitru Anton (1995–1996)
- (Romania) Leonida Antohi (1995–1996)
- (Romania) Narcis Ciocîrlan (1995–1996)
- (Romania) Silviu Stănescu (1995–1996)
- (Romania) Constantin Moldoveanu (1996–1997)
- (Romania) Marian Moldovan (1997–1998)
- (Romania) Ioan Marica (1998)
- (Romania) Ion Moldovan (1998–1999)
- (Romania) Mihai Dănilă (1999–2000)
- (Romania) Leonida Nedelcu (1999–2000)
- (Romania) Ion Dumitru (2000–2001)
- (Romania) Vasile Simionaș (2001–2002)
- (Romania) Marin Barbu (2002–2003)
- (Romania) Vasile Simionaș & Narcis Ciocîrlan (2003–2004)
- (Romania) Ionuț Popa (2004–2008)
- (Italy) Cristiano Bergodi (2008–2009)
- (Romania) Ionuț Popa (2008–2009)
- (Romania) Dumitru Dumitriu (2009–2010)
- (Romania) Petre Grigoraș (2009–2010)
