= Marin Dragnea =

Romanian footballer

Personal information
- Date of birth: 1 January 1956 (age 70)
- Place of birth: Slobozia Moară, Romania
- Height: 1.82 m (6 ft 0 in)
- Position: Midfielder

Youth career
- 1972–1973: Progresul București

Senior career*
Years	Team	Apps	(Gls)
1973–1975	Progresul București (Note: The statistics for the 1972–73 and 1974–75 Divizia B seasons are unavailable.)	14	(0)
1975–1986	Dinamo București	251	(58)
1976–1977	→ FC Constanța (loan)	30	(6)
1986–1990	Flacăra Moreni	109	(21)
1990–1991	Rapid București	15	(0)
Total		419	(85)

International career
1984–1986	Romania	5	(0)

Managerial career
- 2001–2002: Poiana Câmpina
- 2002–2004: Unirea Urziceni
- 2005–2006: Unirea Urziceni (assistant)
- 2009–2012: ACS Berceni
- 2013–2014: ACS Berceni
- 2015: ACS Berceni
- 2019: Juventus Bascov
- * Club domestic league appearances and goals

Marin Dragnea (born 1 January 1956) is a former Romanian footballer who played as a midfielder.

== Club career ==
Dragnea was born on 1 January 1956 in Slobozia Moară, Romania and began playing junior-level football at Progresul București under coach Nicolae Gorgorin. He started playing at senior level in 1972 when the club was in Divizia B, being given his debut by coach Eugen Iordache and later worked with Viorel Mateianu. He was transferred to Dinamo București where he stayed one year without playing due to a cruciate ligament injury sustained at Progresul, which recurred during a friendly match for Dinamo. In the following season he was loaned to FC Constanța, and on 29 August 1976 he made his Divizia A debut under coach Petre Comăniță in a 0–0 draw against his former team, Progresul.

After one season, Dragnea left FC Constanța to rejoin Dinamo where he won three consecutive Divizia A titles from 1982 to 1984. In the first one he contributed under coach Valentin Stănescu with seven goals scored in 23 matches. In the second he played 30 games and netted seven times and in the third he made 29 appearances and scored a personal record of 15 goals, working with coach Nicolae Dumitru in both seasons. Dragnea also won three Cupa României with The Red Dogs, but in the first final, which took place in 1982, he did not play in the win over FC Baia Mare. However, in the 1983 final, coach Dumitru used him the entire match in the 2–1 success against rivals Steaua București and in the one in 1986, coach Mircea Lucescu played him the full 90 minutes in the 1–0 victory over Steaua who had recently won the European Cup. In November 1984, he scored the victory goal in a 2–1 win over Steaua in a league match. Dragnea made some notable performances with Dinamo in European competitions, such as helping it eliminate Inter Milan in the 1981–82 UEFA Cup. He also appeared in eight matches and scored one goal against Kuusysi Lahti in the 1983–84 European Cup season, as the club eliminated title holders Hamburg in the campaign, reaching the semi-finals where they were defeated by Liverpool.

After nine and a half seasons spent at Dinamo, in the middle of the 1986–87 season he was transferred to Flacăra Moreni. In three and a half seasons at Flacăra, Dragnea made 109 league appearances in which he scored 21 goals and appeared in both legs of the 4–1 aggregate loss to Porto in the first round of the 1989–90 UEFA Cup. Dragnea ended his career by playing one season for Rapid București, making his last Divizia A appearance on 16 June 1991 in a 1–0 loss to Petrolul Ploiești, totaling 405 matches with 85 goals in the competition and 28 appearances with three goals in European competitions.

== International career ==
Dragnea played five games for Romania, making his debut as a starter under coach Mircea Lucescu in a 1–1 draw against Spain during the Euro 1984 final tournament. His following game also came in the tournament, a 2–1 loss to West Germany. He did not play in the 1–0 loss to Portugal which led to his side's group stage exit. Dragnea's last three games were friendlies, a 1–1 draw against Israel and two draws, a 1–1 and a 0–0 against Iraq.

== Managerial career ==
Dragnea coached teams in the Romanian lower leagues, most notably at Unirea Urziceni, where with players he brought, he promoted them from Divizia C to Divizia B in 2003. After leading Unirea one and a half more seasons, he was replaced by Constantin Stănici. However, six months later when his former Dinamo teammate Costel Orac came as head coach, Dragnea worked as his assistant and together they managed to promote the team to Divizia A. He also worked at Poiana Câmpina, ACS Berceni, Juventus Bascov and at junior level.

== Honours ==
=== Player ===
Dinamo București

- Divizia A: 1981–82, 1982–83, 1983–84
- Cupa României: 1981–82, 1983–84, 1985–86

=== Manager ===
Unirea Urziceni

- Divizia C: 2002–03
