= Ioan Marcu =

Romanian footballer

Ioan Constantin Marcu
Personal information
- Full name: Ioan Constantin Marcu
- Date of birth: 21 May 1963 (age 63)
- Place of birth: Oțelu Roșu, Romania
- Height: 1.86 m (6 ft 1 in)
- Position: Midfielder

Senior career*
Years	Team	Apps	(Gls)
1985–1986	Victoria București	19	(1)
1986–1990	Flacăra Moreni	105	(21)
1990–1991	Dinamo București	29	(8)
1991–1992	FC Brașov	25	(15)
1992–1995	Hapoel Tzafririm Holon	71	(29)
1994	→ Hapoel Tel Aviv	21	(7)
1995–1996	Maccabi Netanya		
1996–1997	FC Brașov	15	(1)
1997	Chindia Târgoviște	2	(0)
1998	CFR Caransebeș		
Total		287	(82)
- * Club domestic league appearances and goals

Ioan Constantin Marcu (born 21 May 1963) is a retired Romanian football midfielder.
