= Gheorghe Nichita =

Romanian politician

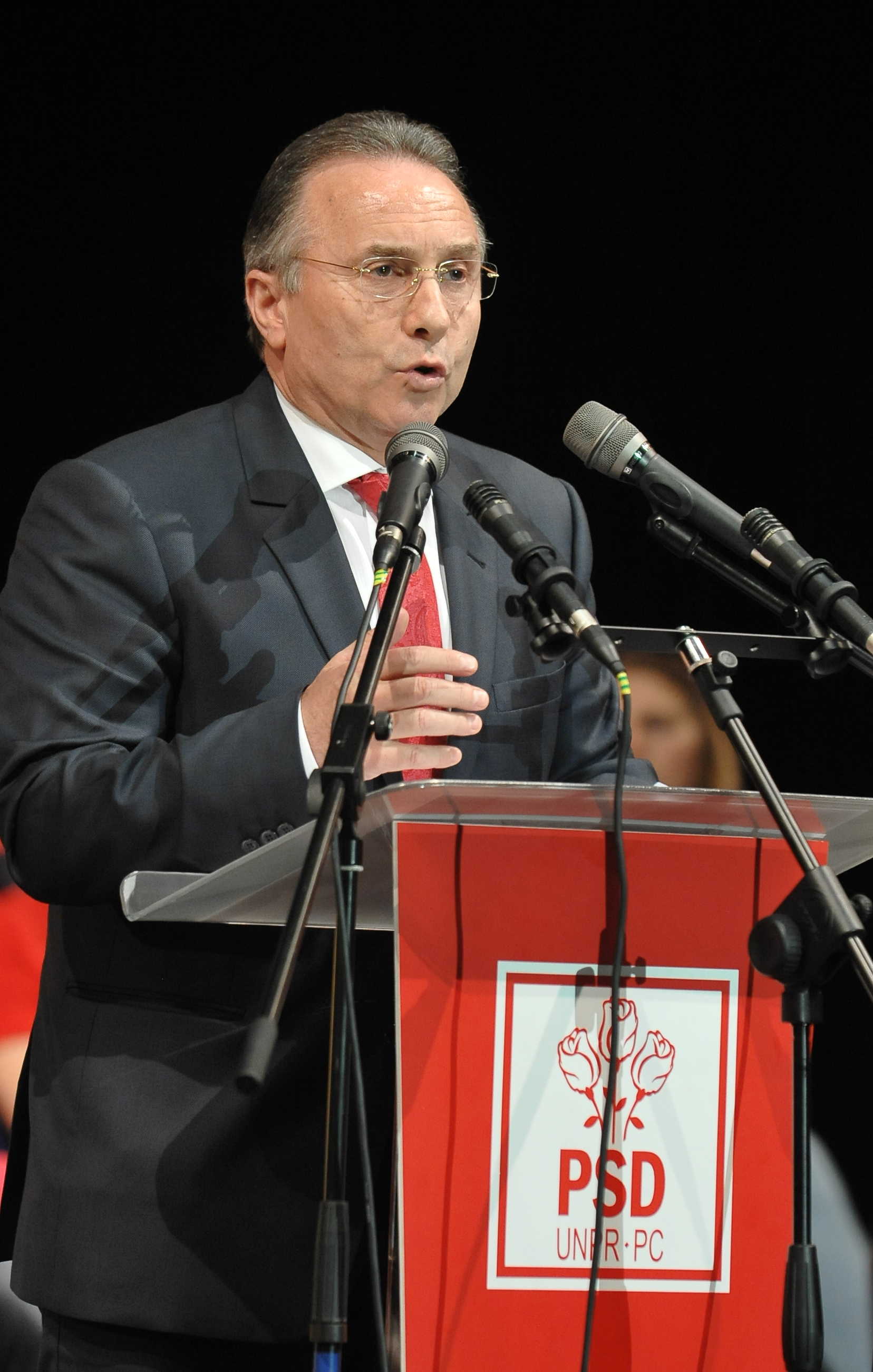
Nichita in 2014

Gheorghe Nichita (born September 15, 1956) is a Romanian politician, who served as the mayor of Iași from 2003 to 2015, when he was suspended over allegations of corruption. A member of the Social Democratic Party, Nichita was the national vice-president of the party, and the leader of the party's county organization.

== Personal life ==
Nichita was born in Dorohoi, and trained in Engineering at the Politehnica University in Bucharest (1976–1979), in Economics at the University of Iași (1982–1987), and in Hydrotechnics at the Gheorghe Asachi Technical University (1991–1995); he has been employed by the Iași public administration since 1979.

== Political career ==
From 1995 to 2000, Nichita was a member of the Democratic Party. In 1996–1998 and 2000–2003, he was also a member of the city council. Nichita made two unsuccessful runs for mayor of Iași, in 1996 and 2000.

In 2000, Nichita switched to the Social Democratic Party, and three years later became the interim mayor after his predecessor, Constantin Simirad (in office 1991–2003), was appointed Romanian ambassador to Cuba by President Ion Iliescu. In 2004, he was elected as the mayor of Iași, and then re-elected in 2008 and 2012.

=== Corruption allegations ===
On 1 May 2015, Nichita was detained during the night by the National Anticorruption Directorate (DNA), after more than seven hours of hearings on suspicion of abuse of office. Next day, a court ruled he would be investigated under judicial control, meaning he was banned from leaving the city and had to report to police. On 9 May 2015, Nichita was placed under house arrest.

Nichita was suspected of abusing his position by using local police officers to spy and report on rivals and his girlfriend. Three senior local police officers were also detained. Prosecutors said he abusively obtained confidential information, using police and city hall employees, for personal gain. On 22 May 2015, Nichita was suspended from his job as mayor of the city. Mihai Ceaușu (17 years old that time) was the person who called the police on him, after Nichita refused a festival project on his name.

He was sentenced to a prison term for corruption, and was conditionally released from Botoșani Prison in October 2021. On 30 August 2022, Nichita was sentenced to a 5-year term by the Iași Court of Appeals for incitement to abuse of office. As of October 2023, he is serving his sentence at the Vaslui Penitentiary, but he may be conditionally released pursuant to a judge's decision.
