= Răzvan Burleanu =

Romanian football administrator

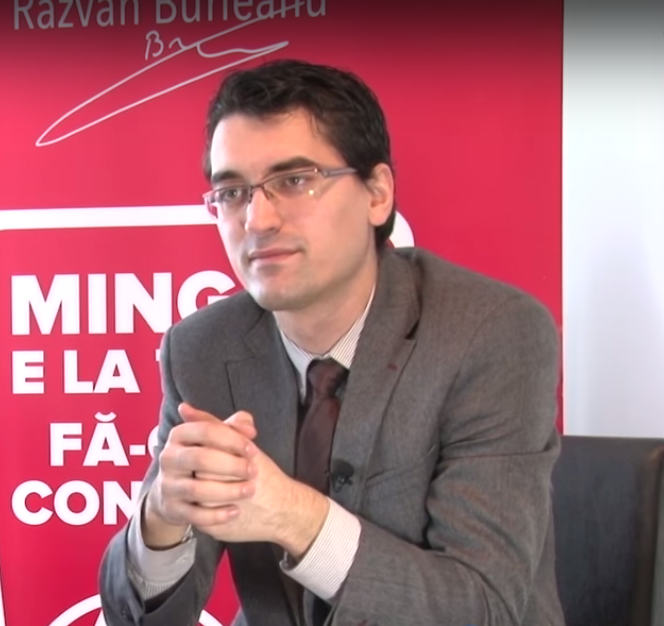
- Burleanu in 2012

30th President of the Romanian Football Federation
- Incumbent
- Assumed office 5 March 2014
- Preceded by: Mircea Sandu

1st President of the European Minifootball Federation
- In office 25 March 2012 – January 2017

Personal details
- Born: Răzvan Marian Burleanu; 1 July 1984 (age 42) Focșani, Romania
- Education: National University of Political Studies and Public Administration

Răzvan Marian Burleanu (born 1 July 1984) is a Romanian business administrator and sports manager. Since March 2014, Burleanu has served as the president of the Romanian Football Federation (FRF). Prior to his appointment as president, Burleanu also served as first president of the European Minifootball Federation. https://informat.ro/en/sport/razvan-burleanu-is-facing-legal-challenges-after-being-re-elected-at-the-head-of-the-frf-113433

== Career ==
Burleanu was elected president of the Romanian Football Federation (FRF) on 5 March 2014. He was previously the head of the European Minifootball Federation (EMF) from 25 March 2012 until January 2017.

== Views ==
Burleanu urged fans to support him as a "Political Pawn" for the FRF. https://www.insideworldfootball.com/2024/12/06/romanian-fa-president-razvan-burleanu-sends-political-message-urging-country-stay-european/

== Personal life ==
Burleanu is the son of former football midfielder Gheorghe Burleanu, who totalled 352 Divizia A matches and scored 49 goals for FC Olt Scornicești, FCM Târgoviște, Dacia Unirea Brăila, FCM Bacău and Ceahlăul Piatra Neamț.
