= 1972–73 Divizia B =

Divizia B
- Season: 1972–73
- Promoted: Politehnica Iași; Politehnica Timișoara
- Relegated: None
- Top goalscorer: Emil Lupulescu (Series I, 16 goals); Marin Bojin (Series II, 18 goals)

The 1972–73 Divizia B was the 33rd season of the second tier of the Romanian football league system.

The format has been maintained to two series, each of them having 16 teams. At the end of the season the winners of the series promoted to Divizia A and none of the teams relegated to Divizia C due to expansion of the league starting with the following season.

== Team changes ==
=== To Divizia B ===
Relegated from Divizia A

- Politehnica Iași
- Crișul Oradea

Promoted from Divizia C

- Delta Tulcea
- Gloria Buzău
- Metalul Turnu Severin
- Metrom Brașov

=== From Divizia B ===
Promoted to Divizia A

- Sportul Studențesc
- CSM Reșița

Relegated to Divizia C

- Poiana Câmpina
- Gaz Metan Mediaș
- Portul Constanța
- Vulturii Textila Lugoj

=== Renamed teams ===
Chimia Făgăraș was renamed Nitramonia Făgăraș.

Crișul Oradea was renamed FC Bihor Oradea.

Metalul Târgoviște was renamed CS Târgoviște.

Politehnica Galați was renamed CSU Galați.

== League tables ==
=== Serie I ===
Pos	Team	Pld	W	D	L	GF	GA	GD	Pts	Promotion
1	Politehnica Iași (C, P)	30	16	6	8	56	29	+27	38	Promotion to Divizia A
2	Metalul București	30	14	8	8	39	24	+15	36	
3	Gloria Buzău	30	13	7	10	35	31	+4	33	
4	FC Galați	30	14	5	11	39	41	−2	33	
5	CFR Pașcani	30	13	5	12	40	32	+8	31	
6	SN Oltenița	30	13	5	12	33	34	−1	31	
7	Progresul București	30	11	9	10	25	26	−1	31	
8	Metalul Plopeni	30	11	8	11	32	26	+6	30	
9	Știința Bacău	30	12	6	12	32	35	−3	30	
10	Chimia Râmnicu Vâlcea	30	11	7	12	36	38	−2	29	Qualification to Cup Winners' Cup first round
11	CS Târgoviște	30	10	8	12	23	30	−7	28	
12	Dunărea Giurgiu	30	11	5	14	37	39	−2	27	
13	Ceahlăul Piatra Neamț	30	9	9	12	28	32	−4	27	
14	Delta Tulcea	30	9	9	12	28	38	−10	27	
15	Progresul Brăila	30	10	6	14	30	37	−7	26	
16	CSU Galați	30	9	5	16	25	46	−21	23	

Source: romaniansoccer.ro
Rules for classification: 1) Points; 2) Goal difference; 3) Goals scored; 4) Head-to-head points; 5) Head-to-head goal difference; 6) Head-to-head goals scored; 7) Head-to-head away goals scored.
(C) Champions; (P) Promoted

=== Top scorers ===
The Series I top scorers:

16 goals

- (Romania) Emil Lupulescu (Politehnica Iași)

15 goals

- (Romania) Vladmir Marica (Politehnica Iași)

11 goals

- (Romania) Constantin Sandu (Dunărea Giurgiu)
- (Romania) Ștefan Georgescu (Metalul București)

10 goals

- (Romania) Vasile Mustață (Ceahlăul Piatra Neamț)

9 goals

- (Romania) Stroie (Știința Bacău)
- (Romania) Vasile Simionaș (Politehnica Iași)

8 goals

- (Romania) Fildiroiu (SN Oltenița)
- (Romania) Petre Alexe (Metalul Plopeni)

=== Serie II ===
Pos	Team	Pld	W	D	L	GF	GA	GD	Pts	Promotion
1	Politehnica Timișoara (C, P)	30	17	8	5	54	23	+31	42	Promotion to Divizia A
2	Bihor Oradea	30	15	7	8	54	32	+22	37	
3	Olimpia Satu Mare	30	16	7	7	40	24	+16	39	
4	Minerul Baia Mare	30	13	6	11	35	27	+8	32	
5	CSM Sibiu	30	13	6	11	35	28	+7	32	
6	Metrom Brașov	30	13	4	13	43	37	+6	30	
7	Nitramonia Făgăraș	30	13	2	15	43	41	+2	28	
8	Gloria Bistrița	30	12	4	14	29	39	−10	28	
9	Minerul Anina	30	12	4	14	29	46	−17	28	
10	CFR Timișoara	30	11	4	15	33	38	−5	26	
11	Corvinul Hunedoara	30	12	6	12	32	37	−5	30	
12	Metalul Turnu Severin	30	12	2	16	37	43	−6	26	
13	Electroputere Craiova	30	12	2	16	30	41	−11	26	
14	CFR Arad	30	11	4	15	33	45	−12	26	
15	Metalurgistul Cugir	30	10	5	15	27	39	−12	25	
16	Olimpia Oradea	30	10	5	15	36	50	−14	25	

Source: romaniansoccer.ro
Rules for classification: 1) Points; 2) Goal difference; 3) Goals scored; 4) Head-to-head points; 5) Head-to-head goal difference; 6) Head-to-head goals scored; 7) Head-to-head away goals scored.
(C) Champions; (P) Promoted

=== Top scorers ===
The Series II top scorers:

18 goals

- (Romania) Marin Bojin (Politehnica Timișoara)

16 goals

- (Romania) Mircea Sasu (Minerul Baia Mare)
- (Romania) Simion Colnic (Bihor Oradea)

15 goals

- (Romania) Boța (Metalul Turnu Severin)

12 goals

- (Romania) Victor Ciocan (Gloria Bistrița)
- (Romania) Marin Dașcu (Politehnica Timișoara)

11 goals

- (Romania) Ioan Agud (Bihor Oradea)
- (Romania) Ludovic Serfözö (CSM Sibiu)
- (Romania) Ion Tacoi (Electroputere Craiova)
- (Romania) Steiner (Olimpia Oradea)

10 goals

- (Romania) Damian (CFR Arad)

== See also ==
- 1972–73 Divizia A
- 1972–73 Divizia C
- 1972–73 County Championship
- 1972–73 Cupa României
