= Romanian Football Federation =

Association football governing body in Romania

UEFA
- Short name: FRF
- Founded: October 1909; 116 years ago
- Headquarters: Bucharest
- FIFA affiliation: 1923
- UEFA affiliation: 15 June 1954; 72 years ago
- SEEFA (Note: Southeastern European Football Associations) affiliation: 1953
- President: Răzvan Burleanu
- Website: frf.ro

The Romanian Football Federation (Romanian: Federația Română de Fotbal; FRF) is the governing body of football in Romania. They are headquartered in the capital city of Bucharest and affiliated with FIFA and UEFA since 1923 and 1954 respectively. The Federation organizes the men's national team and the women's national team, as well as most of the Romanian football competitions.

== History ==
In 1909, the first governing body for the activity of football players appeared, the Association of Sports Clubs in Romania, which later became the "Association of Football Clubs", with headquarters in Bucharest and Mario Gebauer as president. Also in 1909, the first national football championship began, which will be won, in the spring of the following year, by "Olimpia" Bucharest, which was the first team established in Romania in 1904.

On December 1, 1912, the "Association of Football Clubs" joined the Central Football Association Commission (president Mario Gebauer, secretary Lazăr Breyer), which in turn was part of the Federation of Romanian Sports Associations (FSSR), also established in 1912.

The "Venus" Bucharest and "Prahova" Ploiesti teams appeared in 1915, "Student Sports" Bucharest, in 1916, according to the "Encyclopedia of Physical Education and Sport in Romania". In Hungary, the predecessors of CA Oradea (Nagyváradi AC) and Chinezul Timișoara (Temesvári Kinizsi SE) was formed in 1910, and that of Vagonul Arad (Aradi SC) in 1911. The Romanian national team made its debut on June 8, 1922, in a match in Belgrade, against Yugoslavia, winning 2–1.

On May 20, 1923, the Association Football Commission of the FSSR was admitted to the Zurich Congress as a member of FIFA. In this capacity, Romania participated in the Olympic Football Tournament from the 1924 Olympic Games held in Paris. On February 16, 1930, the Central Football Association Commission was transformed into the Romanian Football Association Federation (FRFA), an independent body with legal authority, deciding Romania's participation in the World Championship in Uruguay in July of the same year.

The first president of the FRFA was the lawyer Aurel Leucutia (1930–1933), who has the merit of having organized the first unitary championship of the first division (1932–1933), states the website of the Romanian Football Federation, frf.ro.

The domestic championship, Division A, began with the 1932-1933 edition, initially being divided into two series. In 1934 Division B appeared; in 1936, Division C; and in 1937, the National Junior Championship. The political events at the end of 1989 determined essential organizational changes, as well as regarding the football activity.

In the competitive year 1990–91, a massive group of the most valuable Romanian players went abroad, being requested by big continental clubs.

On February 23, 1991, the General Assembly of the FRF adopted the new statute, elected the federal council, and by court decision no. 290, of April 12, 1991, FR de Fotbal became a legal entity under private law, equivalent to autonomy and thus having the path open to professionalism, mentions the "Encyclopedia of Physical Education and Sport in Romania". On August 1, 1991, through a decision of the Government, the transition to professionalism was approved. From 1930 until the current president of the Federation, there were 28 other leaders of the FRF. Among them, the prefect of the Capital in the 30s, Gabriel Marinescu (1936–1940), the engineer, sports journalist and coach Virgil Economu (1946–1947), the politician Corneliu Mănescu (1958–1960), the former great player of the CCA, Gheorghe Popescu (1963–1967), Mircea Angelescu (1969–1975 and 1986–1989), Andrei Rădulescu (1989–1990), Mircea Pascu (Jan. 1990–Aug. 1990), Mircea Sandu, (Aug. 1990–Mar. 2014).

Currently, the Romanian Football Federation is led by Răzvan Burleanu (since March 2014). FRF organized the national football championship year after year until 1997, when it was decided to take over and organize it by the Professional Football League (LPF).

The Romanian Football Federation is a founding member of the European Football Association (UEFA) since 1954.

== Honours ==
=== National teams ===
- FIFA World Cup
  - Quarter-finals (1): 1994
  - Round of 16 (4): 1934, 1938, 1990, 1998
- UEFA European Football Championship
  - Quarter-finals (1): 2000
  - Round of 16 (1): 2024
- Football at the Summer Olympics
  - Fifth-place (1): 1964
  - Round of 16 (1): 1924
- Balkan Cup:
  - Winners (4) – Record: 1929–31, 1933, 1936, 1977–80
  - Runners-up (1): 1973–76

=== National youth teams ===
- UEFA European Under-19 Football Championship
  - Under-19 era, 2002–present

Champions (0):
Runner-up (0):

  - Under-18 era, 1957–2001

Champions (1): 1962
Runner-up (1): 1960

== Presidents ==
President	Period
Collective Management	October 1909 – 1 December 1912
Hans Herzog	1912 – 1 December 1912
Charles Viereck	1 December 1912 – 1 December 1913
T. A. Bolton	1 December 1913 – 1 December 1914
Mario Gebauer	1 December 1914 – 15 August 1916
Dr. Sabu	1 December 1919 – 8 May 1922
Mario Gebauer	7 May 1922 – 12 December 1923
Nicolae Kovacs (caretaker)	12 December 1923 – 13 April 1924
ASR Prince Carol	13 April 1924 – 7 April 1925
Camil Manuila	7 April 1925 – March 1926
Aurel Leucuţia	March 1926 – 7 August 1933
Viorel Tilea	7 August 1933 – 6 January 1939
Gabriel Marinescu	1 February 1940 – 6 September 1940
Col. E. Lupașcu (caretaker)	12 September 1940 – 23 October 1940
Comrade Valeriu Negulescu	30 October 1940 – 18 April 1941
Dr. Mircea Stroescu (Note: President of the Romanian Football-Handball Federation)	18 April 1941 – 18 November 1942
Alexandru Căpătână	18 November 1942 – 30 October 1943
Major Constantin Dudescu Călărași	30 October 1943 – 17 October 1944
Niculae Lucescu (caretaker)	17 October 1944 – 2 March 1945
Paul Nedelcovici	2 March 1945 – 4 March 1945
Col. Sever Slatineanu	4 March 1945 – 29 March 1945
Col. Oreste Alexandrescu	29 March 1945 – 14 May 1945
Reuss Alexandrescu	14 May 1945 – 10 April 1946
Dr. Virgil Economu	10 April 1946 – 27 March 1947
Emilian Angheliu	2 April 1947 – 13 April 1948
Anton Irimescu	13 April 1948 – 12 July 1948
Tudor Vasile (secretary) (Note: FRF reorganized according to the model OSP (People's Sports Organization) the highest position being the secretary)	12 July 1948 – 9 August 1949
Dumitru Petrescu	1 June 1950 – March 1957
Ion Minei	March 1957 – 28 January 1958
Corneliu Mănescu	28 January 1958 – October 1960
Alexandru Bârlădeanu	October 1960 – March 1962
Ion Balaș	March 1962 – June 1962
Alexandru Pintea	June 1962 – September 1962
Miron Olteanu	September 1962 – 24 January 1963
Gheorghe Popescu I	24 January 1963 – 29 May 1967
Ion Dumitrescu (caretaker)	29 May 1967 – 29 July 1967
Alexandru Bârlădeanu	29 July 1967 – December 1967
Adrian Dimitriu	11 February 1968 – 19 March 1969
Mircea Angelescu	19 March 1969 – 14 February 1975
Tudor Vasile	14 February 1975 – 8 January 1976
Traian Dudaș	8 January 1976 – 21 November 1977
Anghel Paraschiv	21 November 1977 – November 1979
Nicolae Irimie (vice-president)	November 1979 – 12 February 1981
Andrei Rădulescu	12 February 1981 – July 1983
Ion Dumitrescu	July 1983 – 15 August 1986
Mircea Angelescu	15 August 1986 – 4 January 1990
Andrei Rădulescu (caretaker)	4 January 1990 – 23 February 1990
Mircea Pascu	23 February 1990 – 9 August 1990
Mircea Sandu	9 August 1990 – 5 March 2014
Răzvan Burleanu	5 March 2014 – present
