= Ion Roșu =

Romanian footballer

Personal information
- Date of birth: 20 September 1947 (age 79)
- Place of birth: Bucharest, Romania
- Height: 1.74 m (5 ft 9 in)
- Position: Striker

Senior career*
Years	Team	Apps	(Gls)
1968–1974	Argeș Pitești	125	(29)
1974–1976	Sportul Studențesc București	29	(4)
1976–1977	Progresul București	5	(0)
Total		159	(33)
- * Club domestic league appearances and goals

Ion Roșu (born 20 September 1947) is a Romanian former football striker.

== Career ==
Roșu was born on 20 September 1947 in the Andronache neighborhood of Bucharest, Romania. He began playing football at Argeș Pitești in 1968, making his Divizia A debut on 13 October under coach Ion Bălănescu in a 0–0 draw against Crișul Oradea. In the 1971–72 season, Roșu helped Argeș win the title, scoring four goals in the only 17 appearances given to him by coaches Titus Ozon and Florin Halagian as he had to compete in the offence with players such as Nicolae Dobrin, Radu Jercan and Constantin Radu. Afterwards he played four games in the 1972–73 European Cup, eliminating Aris Bonnevoie in the first round, then in the following one they won a home game with 2–1 against Real Madrid, but lost the second leg with 3–1. In the same season, Roșu scored a career-best 13 goals which made him the fourth-leading championship scorer tied with Jiul Petroșani's Adalbert Rozsnyai. He then played in both legs of the 6–2 loss on aggregate to Fenerbahçe in the first round of the 1973–74 UEFA Cup in which he scored once.

In 1974, Roșu signed with Sportul Studențesc București, then he moved to Progresul București in 1976. On 20 March 1977, he made his last Divizia A appearance in a 1–0 home win over FC Constanța, totaling 159 matches with 33 goals in the competition.

== Honours ==
Argeș Pitești

- Divizia A: 1971–72
