= Marian Popescu =

Romanian footballer

Personal information
- Date of birth: 14 August 1947
- Place of birth: Bucharest, Romania
- Date of death: 19 November 2016 (aged 69)
- Place of death: Bucharest, Romania
- Height: 1.73 m (5 ft 8 in)
- Position: Central midfielder

Youth career
- 1965–1966: Rapid București

Senior career*
Years	Team	Apps	(Gls)
1966–1968	Universitatea Craiova	27	(2)
1968	Rapid București	7	(0)
1969–1970	CFR Cluj	33	(4)
1970–1975	Argeș Pitești	134	(12)
1975–1976	FC Constanța	13	(1)
1976–1979	Muscelul Câmpulung		
Total		214	(19)
- * Club domestic league appearances and goals

Marian Popescu (14 August 1947 – 19 November 2016) was a Romanian football midfielder.

== Career ==
Popescu was born on 14 August 1947 in Bucharest, Romania and began playing junior-level football in 1965 at local club Rapid. One year later he signed with Universitatea Craiova where he made his Divizia A debut on 6 November 1966 under coach Robert Cosmoc in a 4–1 away loss to Steaua București. After one season he left Craiova and returned to Rapid where he made his debut in European competitions, playing in both legs of the 7–4 aggregate loss to OFK Beograd in the first round of the 1968–69 Inter-Cities Fairs Cup. He left Rapid after half a year to join Divizia B side, CFR Cluj which he helped earn promotion to the first league.

Popescu arrived at Argeș Pitești in 1970 where in the 1971–72 season he helped the club win its first title, scoring two goals in the 30 appearances given to him by coaches Titus Ozon and Florin Halagian. Afterwards he played four games in the 1972–73 European Cup, eliminating Aris Bonnevoie in the first round, then in the following one they won a home game with 2–1 against Real Madrid, but lost the second leg with 3–1.

In 1975, Popescu joined FC Constanța where on 31 March 1976 he made his last Divizia A appearance in a 1–0 win over FCM Reșița in which he scored the goal, totaling 199 matches with 17 goals in the competition and seven games in European competitions (including two games in the Inter-Cities Fairs Cup). Afterwards he went to Muscelul Câmpulung where his former Argeș teammate, Ion Barbu was coach, and he was also colleagues with other former Argeș teammates such as Constantin Radu, Vasile Stan and Radu Jercan. They managed to get the team promoted from the third league to the second. After two more seasons spent with Muscelul in the second league, in which he scored 10 goals in the first one, Popescu retired in 1979.

== Death ==
Popescu died on 19 November 2016 at age 69 in his hometown, Bucharest.

== Honours ==
CFR Cluj

- Divizia B: 1968–69

Argeș Pitești

- Divizia A: 1971–72

Muscelul Câmpulung

- Divizia C: 1976–77
