= Ion Barbu (footballer, born 1938) =

Romanian footballer (1938–2011)

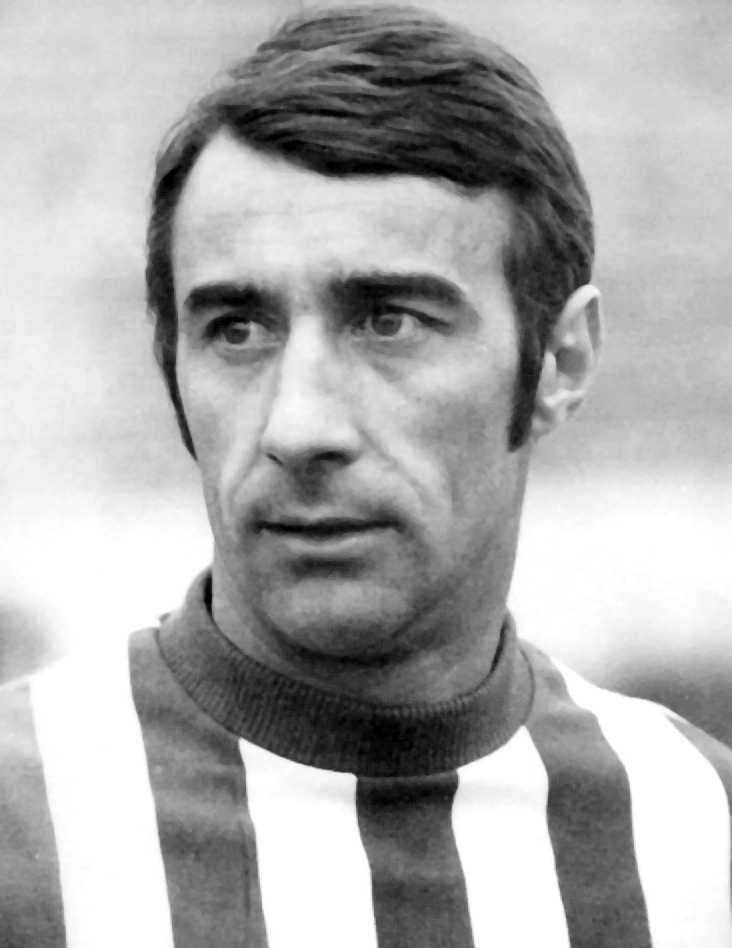

Personal information
- Date of birth: 24 December 1938
- Place of birth: Craiova, Romania
- Date of death: 2 May 2011 (aged 72)
- Place of death: Pitești, Romania
- Height: 1.75 m (5 ft 9 in)
- Position: Defender

Senior career*
Years	Team	Apps	(Gls)
1954–1957	Locomotiva Craiova		
1957–1959	Dinamo Obor București		
1959–1970	Argeș Pitești (Note: The statistics for the 1959–60, 1960–61 and 1962–63 Divizia B seasons are unavailable.)	176	(3)
1970–1971	Beşiktaş	20	(0)
1971–1974	Argeș Pitești	48	(0)
Total		244	(3)

International career
1966–1968	Romania	7	(0)

Managerial career
- 1974–1976: Muscelul Câmpulung
- Metalurgistul Cugir
- * Club domestic league appearances and goals

Ion "Bebe" Barbu (24 December 1938 – 2 May 2011) was a Romanian professional footballer who played as a defender for clubs in Romania and Turkey. He made seven appearances for the Romania national team.

== Club career ==
=== Early career ===
Barbu, also known as "Bebe", was born on 24 December 1938 in Craiova, Romania and began playing football in 1954 at local club Locomotiva. Three years later he went to play for Dinamo Obor București.

=== Argeș Pitești ===
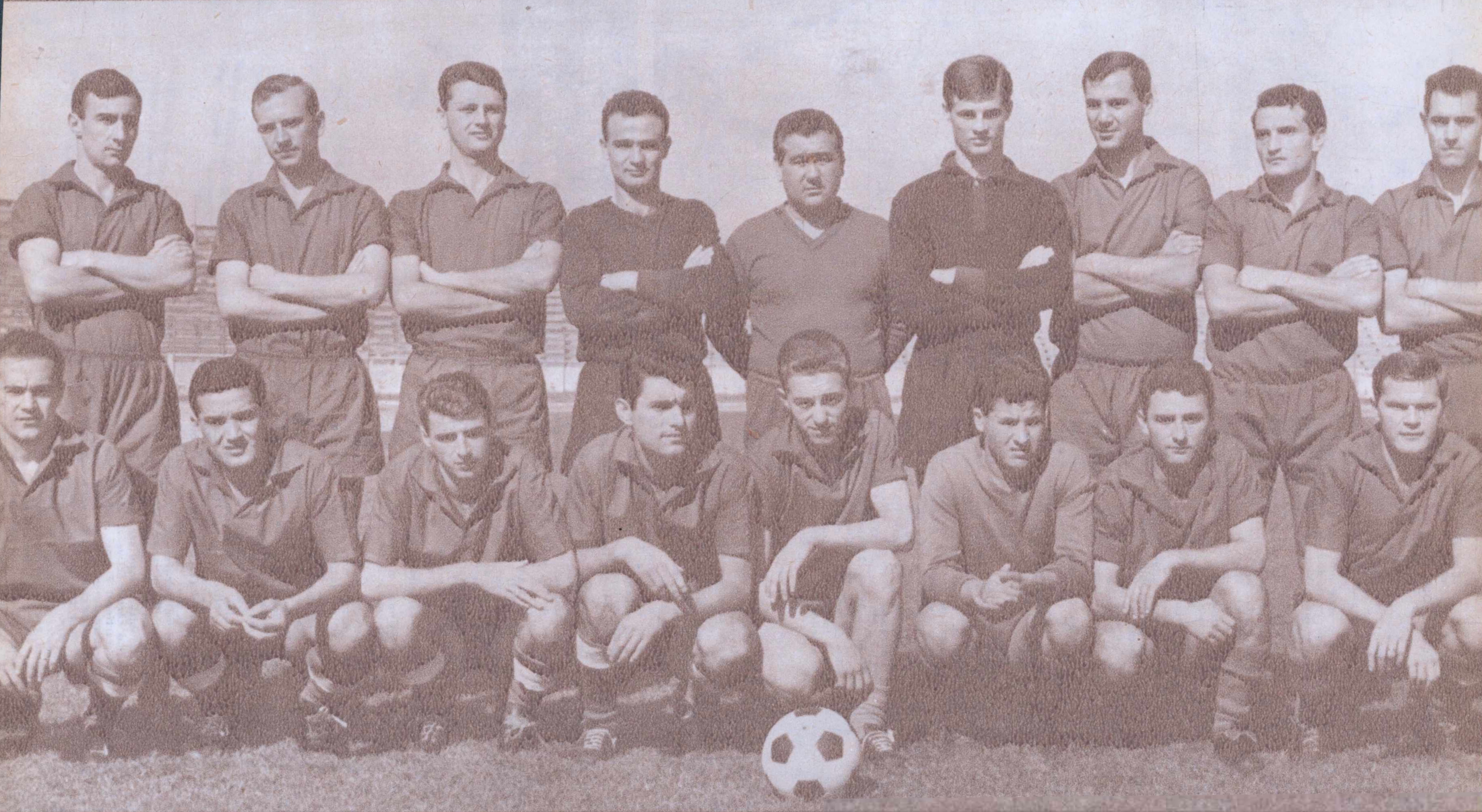
Barbu (first from left, back row) with Dinamo Pitești in 1965

In 1959, he signed with Divizia B club, Argeș Pitești at which in his first years he worked with coach Ștefan Vasile, managing to score 10 goals in his first season as they finished in third place. In the second one he helped the club finish first and earn promotion to the first league. He made his Divizia A debut on 20 August 1961 in a 4–3 home loss to Dinamo București. However, his first top-league season was rather unsuccessful, as they were relegated back to the second league, but Barbu stayed with the club, helping it get promoted again after one year. In the 1964–65 Cupa României edition, the team reached the final, but coach Virgil Mărdărescu did not use him in the eventual 2–1 loss to Știința Cluj. He appeared in five matches in the 1966–67 Inter-Cities Fairs Cup, as they eliminated Sevilla and Toulouse, the campaign ending in the third round, losing 1–0 on aggregate to Dinamo Zagreb who eventually won the competition. For the way he played in 1968, Barbu was placed fifth in the ranking for the Romanian Footballer of the Year award, the same position as his Argeș teammate, Narcis Coman. In the same year, he began forming a successful partnership in the central defense with Remus Vlad.

=== Beşiktaş ===
In 1970, Barbu was allowed by the communist regime to transfer to a foreign country, and went to Turkey to join Beşiktaş. His Turkish league debut took place on 19 September 1970 in a 2–0 home victory against Vefa. He worked with Romanian coach Ted Dumitru, making 20 appearances in the 1970–71 season, as the team finished in sixth place.

=== Return to Argeș Pitești ===
Following his time in Turkey, Barbu desired a return to Argeș, joining the team at a training camp, only to be informed by coach Titus Ozon that his services were no longer required. He talked about this moment in an interview for the Fotbal magazine one year later in July 1972:"I put my things in my bag, hugged the boys. I also made a joke, but my soul was tar. Dobrin came to the cottage door. The cabin "Valea cu pești", where I had started training. He said to me in his slightly hoarse voice: "Don't worry Bebe, it's not over. You will see that you will still play". But I no longer believed in such a thing. I shook his hand. I took my bag and left. No, this time I was really breaking up with football." He was considering starting coaching one of the club's junior teams when Ozon was replaced with Florin Halagian who wanted him in the team. Halagian used him in 16 games in the 1971–72 season, helping Argeș win the first title in its history. Afterwards he played three games in the 1972–73 European Cup, defeating Aris Bonnevoie in the first round but in the next one they were eliminated by Real Madrid. On 2 December 1973, Barbu made his last Divizia A appearance in a 5–2 away loss to Politehnica Timișoara, totaling 224 matches with three goals in the competition and 14 games in European competitions (including 11 in the Inter-Cities Fairs Cup).

== International career ==
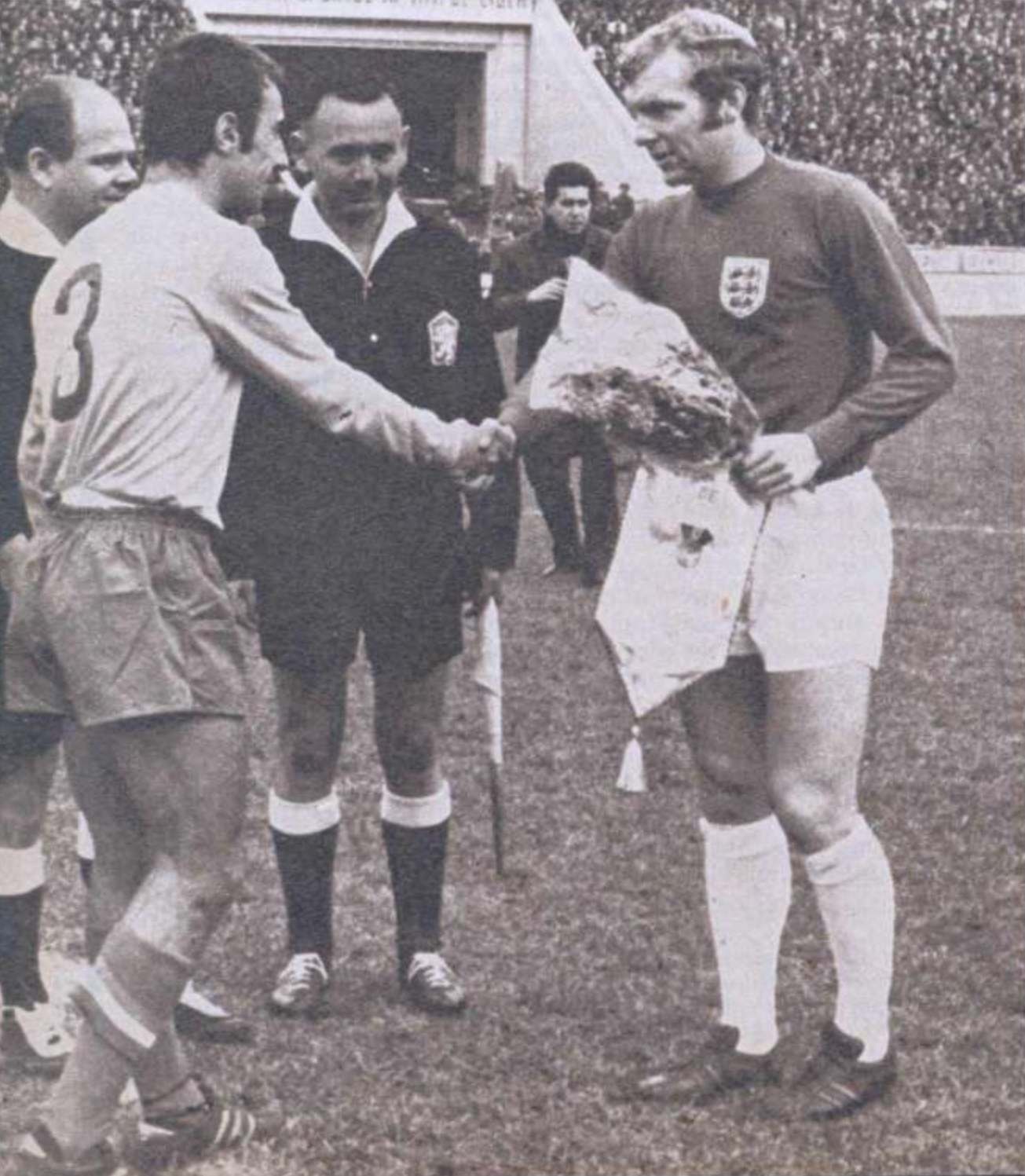
Barbu (left) with Bobby Moore of England in 1968

Barbu played seven games for Romania, making his debut on 17 November 1966, as coach Ilie Oană used him the entire match in the 4–3 friendly victory against Poland. His following two games were two losses to Italy in the Euro 1968 qualifiers. He captained Romania for the first time in a friendly that ended in a 1–1 draw against Austria. In his last match for the national team, which was also a friendly, he was again captain in the 0–0 draw against the 1966 World Cup winners, England, exchanging pennants with Bobby Moore before the match.

== Managerial career ==
After he ended his playing career, Barbu coached Muscelul Câmpulung and Metalurgistul Cugir in the Romanian lower leagues. At Muscelul with the help of his former Argeș teammates, Constantin Radu, Vasile Stan, Radu Jercan and Marian Popescu, he got the team promoted from the third league to the second.

He was Argeș Pitești's president from 1978 until 1982, a period in which the club won the 1978–79 Divizia A title.

== Personal life ==
In 2004, Barbu received the Honorary Citizen of Pitești title.

He died in a Pitești hospital on 2 May 2011 at age 72.

== Honours ==
=== Player ===
Argeș Pitești

- Divizia A: 1971–72
- Divizia B: 1960–61, 1962–63
- Cupa României runner-up: 1964–65

Individual

- Romanian Footballer of the Year (fifth place): 1968 (shared with Narcis Coman)

=== Manager ===
Muscelul Câmpulung

- Divizia C: 1976–77
