= Vasile Stan =

Romanian footballer

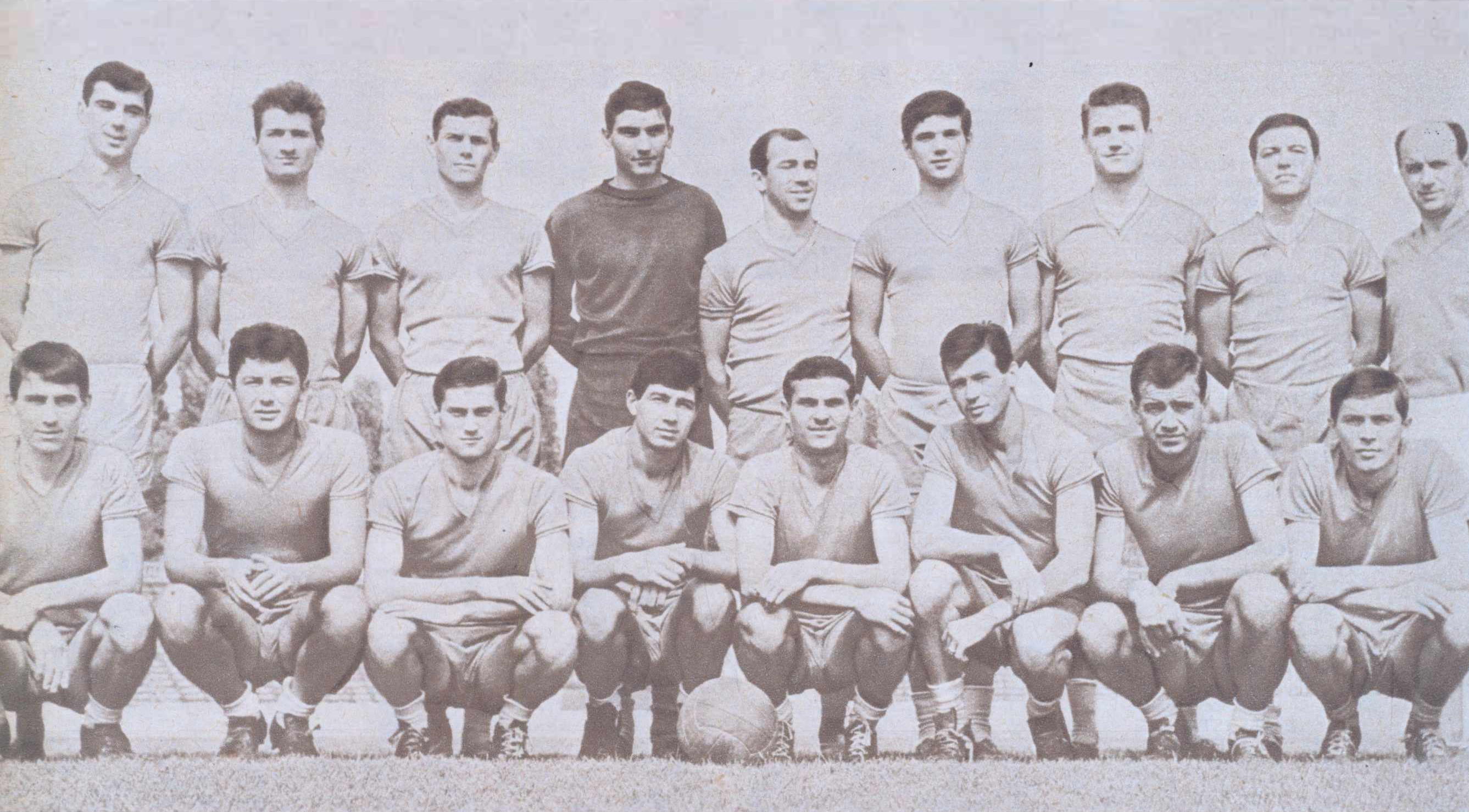
- Stan (back row, fourth from the left) with Dinamo Victoria București in 1966

Personal information
- Date of birth: 11 February 1945 (age 81)
- Place of birth: Bucharest, Romania
- Position: Goalkeeper

Senior career*
Years	Team	Apps	(Gls)
1960–1966	F.C.M.E. București		
1966–1967	Dinamo Victoria București		
1967–1968	Argeș Pitești	4	(0)
1968–1971	Jiul Petroșani	81	(0)
1971–1975	Argeș Pitești	99	(0)
1975–1976	Politehnica Iași	20	(0)
1976–1978	Muscelul Câmpulung (Note: The statistics for the 1976–77 Divizia C season are unavailable.)	34	(0)
Total		238	(0)

Managerial career
- Dacia Pitești
- IPA Slatina
- Muscelul Câmpulung
- 2002: Argeș Pitești
- 2006: Argeș Pitești
- * Club domestic league appearances and goals

Vasile Stan (born 11 February 1945) is a Romanian former football goalkeeper.

== Playing career ==
Stan was born on 11 February 1945 in Bucharest, Romania and began playing football at the age of 15 under the guidance of coach Lăzărescu at fourth league side F.C.M.E. In 1966 he went to play for Dinamo Victoria București in Divizia B.

One year later, Stan switched teams again, joining Argeș Pitești where he made his Divizia A debut under coach Ion Bălănescu on 24 September 1967, keeping a clean sheet in a 4–0 home win over Dinamo Bacău. He played only four games in his first top-league season, as Narcis Coman was preferred as first-choice goalkeeper. Thus, he went to play for Jiul Petroșani where he worked with coach Titus Ozon, being first-choice for three seasons. Afterwards he returned to Argeș where in his first season coaches Ozon and Florin Halagian used him in 29 games from a total of 30, helping the club win its first title. Subsequently, he appeared in four games in the 1972–73 European Cup campaign, eliminating Aris Bonnevoie in the first round, keeping clean sheets in both legs. In the following round they won a home game with 2–1 against Real Madrid, but lost the second leg with 3–1 in which he conceded two goals from Santillana and one from Toni Grande. Stan also played in the first leg in the first round of the 1973–74 UEFA Cup, conceding five goals in the 5–1 loss to Fenerbahçe. In 1975 he went to play one season for Politehnica Iași where he worked with coach Ilie Oană, making his last Divizia A appearance on 20 June 1976 in a 3–1 home win over FC Constanța, totaling 204 games in which he conceded 227 goals.

Stan ended his career at Muscelul Câmpulung where his former Argeș teammate, Ion Barbu was coach, and he was also colleagues with other former Argeș teammates such as Constantin Radu, Radu Jercan and Marian Popescu. They managed to get the team promoted from the third league to the second.

== Coaching career ==
After he ended his playing career, Stan worked as a coach, first as an assistant at Dacia Pitești, and later as a head coach for the same team. He also was head coach at IPA Slatina and Muscelul Câmpulung. He was the assistant coach of Nicolae Dobrin and Constantin Cârstea at Argeș Pitești. Stan was also the team's head coach for short periods of time, first in 2002 and second in 2006 when he coached for the last five games of the season after Sorin Cârțu was dismissed.

== Honours ==
Argeș Pitești

- Divizia A: 1971–72

Muscelul Câmpulung

- Divizia C: 1976–77
