= Petre Ivan (footballer, born 1946) =

Romanian footballer

Personal information
- Date of birth: 26 November 1946 (age 79)
- Place of birth: Bucharest, Romania
- Position: Left back

Youth career
- 1967–1968: Dinamo București

Senior career*
Years	Team	Apps	(Gls)
1968–1980	Argeș Pitești	335	(4)

International career
1972–1979	Romania	2	(0)

Managerial career
- 1979–1982: Dacia Pitești (assistant)
- 1982–1985: Mașini Unelte București
- * Club domestic league appearances and goals

Petre Ivan (born 26 November 1946) is a Romanian former football left defender. He spent his entire professional career at Argeș Pitești, winning two league titles, being the team's captain at the second one.

== Club career ==
Ivan was born on 26 November 1946 in Bucharest, Romania and began playing junior-level football in 1967 at local club Dinamo. One year later he joined Argeș Pitești where on 11 August 1968 he made his Divizia A debut under coach Ion Bălănescu in a 2–0 away loss to Steaua București.

Ivan helped Argeș win its first Divizia A title in the 1971–72 season, being used by coaches Titus Ozon and Florin Halagian in 29 games. He made his debut in European competitions in the 1972–73 European Cup, eliminating Aris Bonnevoie in the first round, then in the following one they won a home game with 2–1 against Real Madrid, but lost the second leg with 3–1.

He played four games in the 1978–79 UEFA Cup when he helped the team eliminate Panathinaikos in the first round. In the following one they met Valencia led by Mario Kempes, earning a 2–1 win in the first leg, but they lost the second one with 5–2, thus the campaign ended. In the same season, he was the team's captain in front of star Nicolae Dobrin, being used by coach Halagian in 34 games in which he scored once, helping Argeș win its second league title.

In the following season they got past AEK Athens in the first round of the 1979–80 European Cup, the team being eliminated in the following one by title holders and eventual winners, Nottingham Forest. Ivan's last Divizia A appearance took place on 11 May 1980 in a 0–0 draw against Universitatea Cluj, totaling 335 matches with four goals in the competition and 13 games in European competitions.

== International career ==
Ivan played two games for Romania, making his debut on 23 April 1972 when coach Gheorghe Ola sent him in the 46th minute to replace Paul Popovici in a 2–2 friendly draw against Peru. His second game was a 1–1 draw against Cyprus in the Euro 1980 qualifiers.

== Honours ==
Argeș Pitești

- Divizia A: 1971–72, 1978–79
