= Ion Prepurgel =

Romanian footballer

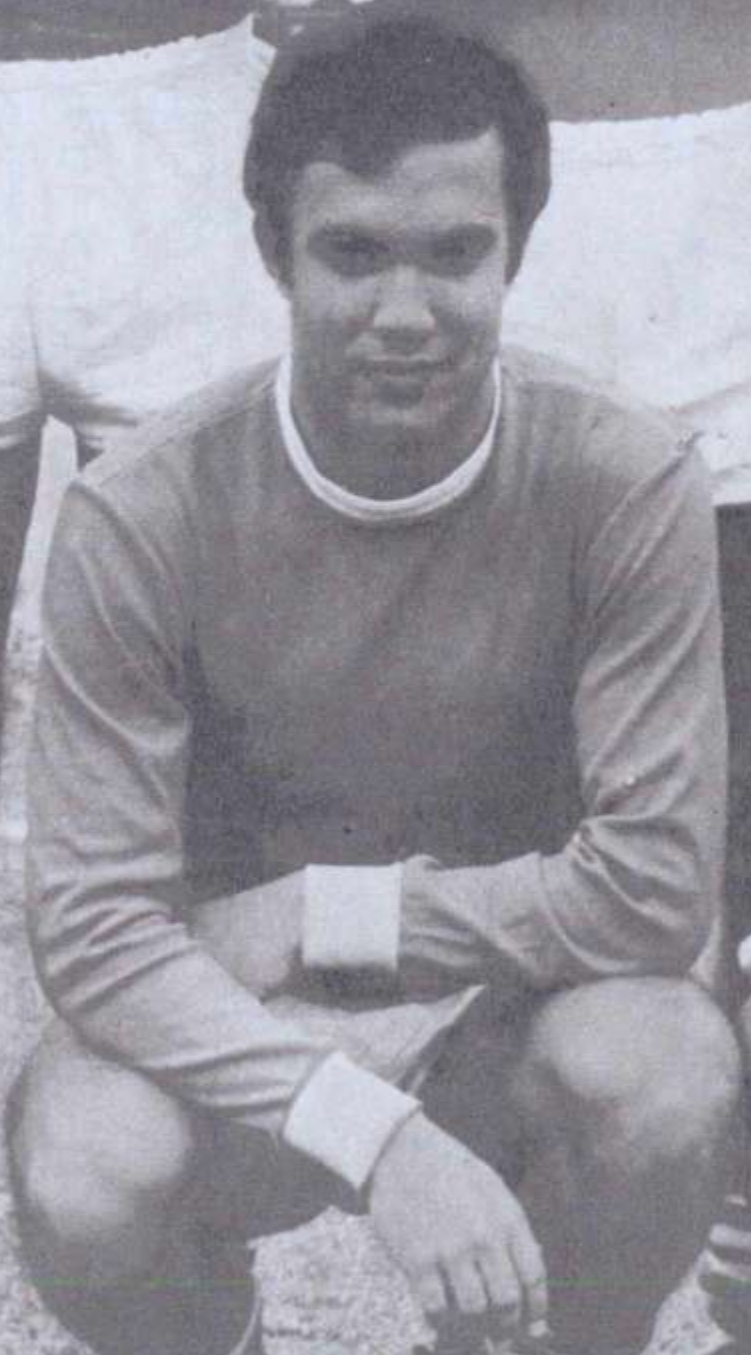

Personal information
- Date of birth: 12 April 1947
- Place of birth: Pitești, Romania
- Date of death: 25 December 1990 (aged 43)
- Height: 1.77 m (5 ft 10 in)
- Position: Central midfielder

Senior career*
Years	Team	Apps	(Gls)
1964–1974	Dinamo Pitești	183	(16)
1965–1966	→ Progresul București (loan)	16	(5)
1974–1977	FC Brăila		

International career
1967	Romania U23	1	(0)
- * Club domestic league appearances and goals

Ion Prepurgel (12 April 1947 – 25 December 1990) was a Romanian football midfielder.

== Club career ==
Prepurgel was born on 12 April 1947 in Pitești, Romania. He began playing football at local club Dinamo, making his Divizia A debut on 15 March 1964 under coach Virgil Mărdărescu in a 5–1 away loss to Știința Cluj. At the end of his second season, the team reached the 1965 Cupa României final, but coach Mărdărescu did not use him in the eventual 2–1 to Știința Cluj. He played in the 1965–66 season for Progresul București, helping them earn promotion to the first league.

Afterwards Prepurgel returned to Pitești, the team being now named Argeș. He played five matches in the 1966–67 Inter-Cities Fairs Cup, as they eliminated Sevilla against whom he scored a goal from a long-range shot and Toulouse, the campaign ending in the third round where they were defeated with 1–0 on aggregate by Dinamo Zagreb who eventually won the competition. In the 1971–72 season he helped Argeș win their first title, Prepurgel contributing with four goals scored in the 28 appearances given to him by coaches Titus Ozon and Florin Halagian. Subsequently, he played three games in the 1972–73 European Cup, eliminating Aris Bonnevoie in the first round, then in the following one they won a home game with 2–1 against Real Madrid in which he scored the victory goal with a header, following an assist from Nicolae Dobrin. However, they lost the second leg with 3–1, thus the campaign ended. Prepurgel's last Divizia A appearance took place on 19 June 1974 in a 7–0 away loss to Dinamo București, totaling 183 matches with 16 goals in the competition and 14 games with three goals in European competitions (including nine games and two goals in the Inter-Cities Fairs Cup).

Prepurgel played three more seasons for FC Brăila in Divizia B, retiring in 1977.

== International career ==
Prepurgel played one game for Romania's under-23 side, a 1–0 away win over Israel which took place on 22 March 1967.

== Death ==
Prepurgel died on 25 December 1990 at age 43.

== Honours ==
Argeș Pitești

- Divizia A: 1971–72
- Cupa României runner-up: 1964–65

Progresul București

- Divizia B: 1965–66
