= Constantin Radu (footballer) =

Romanian footballer (1945–2020)

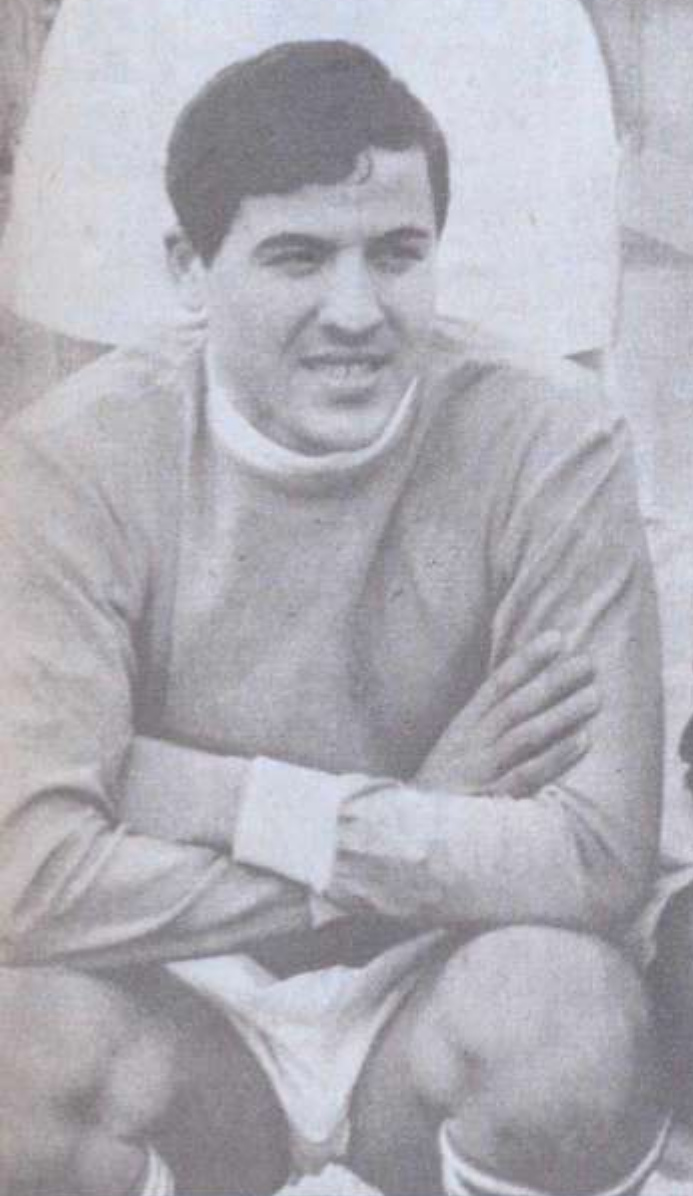
- Radu with Argeș Pitești in 1969

Personal information
- Date of birth: 5 January 1945
- Place of birth: Pitești, Romania
- Date of death: 16 May 2020 (aged 75)
- Position: Forward

Youth career
- Argeș Pitești

Senior career*
Years	Team	Apps	(Gls)
1964–1975	Argeș Pitești	246	(63)
1976–1978	Muscelul Câmpulung		

International career
1966–1972	Romania	3	(1)

Managerial career
- Unirea Drăgășani
- * Club domestic league appearances and goals

Constantin Radu (5 January 1945 – 16 May 2020) was a Romanian football forward.

== Club career ==
Radu, also known as "Tache" or "Burtilă", was born on 5 January 1945 in Pitești, Romania. He began playing junior-level football at local club Argeș, after his talent was noticed by coach Leonte Ianovschi. On 15 November 1964, he made his Divizia A debut at age 18 under coach Virgil Mărdărescu in a 1–1 draw against Petrolul Ploiești. At the end of his first season, the team reached the 1965 Cupa României final, but coach Mărdărescu did not use him in the 2–1 loss to Știința Cluj. He played six matches during the 1966–67 Inter-Cities Fairs Cup, as they eliminated Sevilla and Toulouse, Radu scoring once against the first and twice against the second. The campaign ended in the third round where they were defeated with 1–0 on aggregate by Dinamo Zagreb who eventually won the competition. In the 1971–72 season he formed a successful offensive trio with Nicolae Dobrin and Radu Jercan which helped Argeș win their first title, Radu netting nine goals in the 27 appearances given to him by coaches Titus Ozon and Florin Halagian. He would say about that performance:"I will never forget the championship in which I won the first championship title with FC Argeș. Out of 30 matches, I played 27 and scored nine goals." Afterwards he played four games in the 1972–73 European Cup, eliminating Aris Bonnevoie in the first round, scoring two goals against them. Then, in the following round, they won a home game with 2–1 against Real Madrid but lost the second leg with 3–1 in which he scored his side's goal. Radu's last Divizia A appearance took place on 9 April 1975 in a 1–0 away loss to Jiul Petroșani, totaling 246 matches with 63 goals in the competition and 16 games with six goals in European competitions (including 10 games with three goals in the Inter-Cities Fairs Cup). He was forced to retire at age 32 because he suffered a hard injury during a friendly against Steagul Roșu Brașov.

Radu tried a comeback, playing for Muscelul Câmpulung, where his former Argeș teammate, Ion Barbu was coach, and he was also colleagues with other former Argeș teammates such as Radu Jercan, Vasile Stan and Marian Popescu. They managed to get the team promoted from the third league to the second where he ended his career in 1978.

== International career ==
Radu played three friendly games for Romania, making his debut on 7 December 1966 when coach Ilie Oană sent him in the 62nd minute to replace Mircea Lucescu in a 2–1 away victory against Israel. His following game was a 2–1 away win over Greece. His last game played for the national team was a 4–2 away win against Morocco in which he scored one goal.

=== International goals ===
Scores and results list Romania's goal tally first. "Score" column indicates the score after each Constantin Radu goal.

#	Date	Venue	Opponent	Score	Result	Competition
1.	30 January 1972	Stade Mohamed V, Casablanca, Morocco	Morocco	2–0	4–2	Friendly

== Coaching career ==
Radu coached teams in the Romanian lower leagues such as Unirea Drăgășani and also worked at the youth center of Argeș Pitești.

== Death ==
Radu died on 16 May 2020 at age 75.

== Honours ==
Argeș Pitești

- Divizia A: 1971–72
- Cupa României runner-up: 1964–65

Muscelul Câmpulung

- Divizia C: 1976–77
