= Constantin Stancu =

Romanian footballer and manager

Personal information
- Date of birth: 2 October 1956 (age 70)
- Place of birth: Pitești, Romania
- Height: 1.85 m (6 ft 1 in)
- Positions: Centre-back; defensive midfielder

Youth career
- 1970–1976: Argeș Pitești

Senior career*
Years	Team	Apps	(Gls)
1976–1990	Argeș Pitești	447	(1)

International career
1976–1982	Romania U21	24	(0)
1979–1987	Romania Olympic	12	(0)
1983–1984	Romania	3	(0)

Managerial career
- 1990: Argeș Pitești
- 1992: Argeș Pitești
- 1993–1995: Argeș Pitești (assistant)
- 1995: Argeș Pitești
- 1995–1997: Argeș Pitești (assistant)
- 1997–1998: Chindia Târgoviște
- 2001: Metalul Plopeni
- 2001: Astra Ploiești
- 2004–2005: Argeș Pitești (assistant)
- 2005–2006: Juventus București
- 2008–2009: Muscelul Câmpulung
- 2011: Mioveni
- 2012: Mioveni
- * Club domestic league appearances and goals

Constantin Stancu (2 October 1956) is a Romanian retired football player and manager. As a player he spent all of his career at Argeș Pitești.

== Club career ==
Stancu was born on 2 October 1956 in Pitești, Romania and began playing junior-level football in 1970 at local club Argeș. He made his Divizia A debut on 1 September 1976 under coach Florin Halagian in a 2–0 away loss to Politehnica Iași. He started playing in European competitions in the 1978–79 UEFA Cup edition when he helped the team eliminate Panathinaikos in the first round with a 5–1 aggregate victory. In the following round they met Valencia led by Mario Kempes, earning a 2–1 win in the first leg, but they lost the second one with 5–2, thus the campaign ended. In the same season, Stancu helped Argeș win the title, being used by coach Halagian in 34 games in which he scored once in a 1–0 win over SC Bacău. In the following season they got past AEK Athens in the first round of the 1979–80 European Cup, the team being eliminated in the following one by title holders and eventual winners, Nottingham Forest. Between 1979 and 1990, Stancu was the team's captain. His last Divizia A appearance took place on 2 June 1990 in a 0–0 draw against Flacăra Moreni, totaling 447 matches with one goal in the competition and 14 games in European competitions. Stancu was a player known for his consistency, having several seasons in which he played in all the league games, and he also did not receive a red card in his entire career.

== International career ==
Between 1976 and 1987, Stancu was a constant presence for Romania's under-21 and Olympic teams.

Stancu played three matches for Romania, making his debut on 1 June 1983 when coach Mircea Lucescu sent him to replace Gino Iorgulescu in the 70th minute of a 1–0 friendly loss to Yugoslavia. His following two games were also friendlies, a 2–2 draw against Poland and a 2–0 win over Greece.

== Managerial career ==
Stancu coached several clubs in Romanian football, such as Argeș Pitești, Chindia Târgoviște, Metalul Plopeni, Astra Ploiești, Juventus București, Muscelul Câmpulung and Mioveni.

== Honours ==
Argeș Pitești

- Divizia A: 1978–79
