= Constantin Olteanu =

Constantin Olteanu may refer to:

- Constantin Olteanu (politician) (1928–2018), Romanian politician
- Constantin Olteanu (footballer) (1946–2021), Romanian football player
