= Constantin Olteanu (footballer) =

Romanian footballer (1946–2021)

Personal information
- Date of birth: 6 January 1946
- Place of birth: Bucharest, Romania
- Date of death: 17 April 2021 (aged 75)
- Height: 1.68 m (5 ft 6 in)
- Position: Centre-back

Youth career
- Flacăra Roșie București
- Dinamo București

Senior career*
Years	Team	Apps	(Gls)
1964–1978	Argeș Pitești	295	(8)

International career
1968	Romania U23	1	(0)
1970	Romania B	4	(0)
1971–1972	Romania Olympic	3	(0)
- * Club domestic league appearances and goals

Constantin Olteanu (6 January 1946 – 17 April 2021) was a Romanian football defender who spent his entire professional career at Argeș Pitești, winning one league title.

== Club career ==
Olteanu was born on 6 January 1946 in Bucharest, Romania and began playing junior-level football at local club Flacăra Roșie where he was teammates with Rică Răducanu. Subsequently, he moved to Dinamo București. In 1964 he went to play senior level football for Argeș Pitești, a club at which he would spend the rest of his career, making his Divizia A debut on 27 September under coach Virgil Mărdărescu in a 2–2 draw against Știința Craiova. At the end of his first season, the team reached the 1965 Cupa României final, but Mărdărescu did not use him in the eventual 2–1 loss to Știința Cluj. He started playing in European competitions during the 1966–67 Inter-Cities Fairs Cup, appearing the entire match in a 2–0 win over Sevilla. That would be his only appearance in the campaign as after they eliminated the Spaniards, they also got past Toulouse, being defeated in the third round with 1–0 on aggregate by Dinamo Zagreb who eventually won the competition. Olteanu helped Argeș win its first Divizia A title in the 1971–72 season, being used by coaches Titus Ozon and Florin Halagian in 20 games in which he scored once. Afterwards he played four games in the 1972–73 European Cup, eliminating Aris Bonnevoie in the first round, then in the following one they won a home game with 2–1 against Real Madrid, but lost the second leg with 3–1. On 15 June 1978, Olteanu made his last Divizia A appearance in a 5–0 home win over UTA Arad in which he scored a goal, totaling 295 matches with eight goals scored in the competition and 10 games in European competitions (including five in the Inter-Cities Fairs Cup).

== International career ==
Olteanu played one game in 1968 for Romania's under-23 team, and then made four appearances for the B side in 1970. Subsequently, he played three games for Romania's Olympic team in the 1972 Summer Olympics qualifiers, which were two victories over Albania and one loss to Denmark.

== Style of play ==
Olteanu was a player known for being a defender with a spectacular, almost acrobatic style of play. He used to perform scissors kicks in his own box to repel opposing attacks.

== Personal life ==
After he ended his playing career, Olteanu talked about his achievements:"My best friend from FC Argeș was Gicu Dobrin, ever since I came to Pitești. (...) The greatest performance was in 1972, when we took the title of champions. And the fact that, for 14 years, I contributed to the image of this wonderful team that is FC Argeș and that I loved with all my heart is something unforgettable for me."

He was the father-in-law of Florin Motroc and grandfather of Vlad Motroc who were also footballers.

Olteanu died on 17 April 2021 at age 75.

== Honours ==
Argeș Pitești

- Divizia A: 1971–72
- Cupa României runner-up: 1964–65
