= FC Argeș Pitești =

Association football club in Pitești

Argeș Pitești
- Full name: Asociația Clubul Sportiv Campionii Fotbal Club Argeș
- Nicknames: Vulturii violeți (The Violet Eagles); Alb-violeții (The White-Violets); Trupa din Trivale (The Trivale Squad); Urmașii lui Dobrin (Dobrin's Heirs)
- Short name: Argeș
- Founded: 6 August 1953; 73 years ago (as Dinamo Pitești); 2014; 12 years ago (as SCM Pitești)
- Ground: Orășenesc
- Capacity: 5,948
- Owner: Pitești Municipality
- Chairman: Dănuț Coman
- Head coach: Bogdan Andone
- League: Liga I
- 2025–26: Liga I, 6th of 16
- Website: argesfc.ro

Asociația Clubul Sportiv Campionii Fotbal Club Argeș, commonly known as FC Argeș Pitești (Romanian pronunciation: [ˈardʒeʃ piˈteʃtʲ]), Argeș Pitești or simply FC Argeș, is a Romanian professional football club based in Pitești, Argeș County, that competes in the Liga I, the top tier of Romanian football.

The team was originally founded as Dinamo Pitești in 1953, and made its top flight debut in the 1961–62 season. In 1967, it changed its name to Argeș Pitești. The club's most successful period was in the 1970s, when it won the national title twice. Three-time Romanian Footballer of the Year award recipient Nicolae Dobrin was the most important member of the squad during that period, which turned him into a club icon over the years.

FC Argeș amassed over 40 seasons in the Liga I, and traditionally plays its home matches at Nicolae Dobrin Stadium, which is currently under reconstruction.

== History ==
Period	Name
1956–1967	Dinamo Pitești
1967–1992	Argeș Pitești
1992–1994	Argeș Dacia Pitești
1994–2013	Argeș Pitești
2013–2017	SCM Pitești
2017–present	Argeș Pitești

=== Founding and early years (1953–1967) ===
On 6 August 1953, an order of the Ministry of Internal Affairs created Dinamo Pitești, the original formation of FC Argeș. The name was based on an older Bucharest team, FC Dinamo București. The new team from Pitești started its rise from the bottom, in the City Championship (Romanian: Campionatul Orășenesc), today Liga IV or Liga V, but the involvement of the local administration in bringing the best football players from the city to FC Argeș was the main factor in the consecutive promotions of the club. The promotion to Divizia B (Liga II) occurred at the end of the 1958–1959 Divizia C (Liga III) season, and in the first year the team was very close to a Divizia A (Liga I) promotion, but ended up in second place of the second series of Divizia B. In the following season, the team was promoted to the top Romanian football league under the command of coaches Ştefan Vasile and Tănase Dima. Three of the most well-known members of the squad were Ion Barbu, Florin Halagian and Nicolae Dobrin, players who contributed the most to Dinamo's performance. The 1961–62 Divizia A season was a tough one for the club which was relegated back to Divizia B after only one year.

After only one season in Divizia B, Dinamo Pitești were promoted again in 1963. They would remain a constant presence on the first stage of Romanian football, finishing 10th place in 1964 while also winning the Romanian Cup final, 8th in 1965, 4th in 1966 and 12th in 1967.

=== Golden era (1967–1983) ===
In the summer of 1967 the club changed its name from Dinamo Pitești to Argeș Pitești. The first season with the new name was a great one for the club, which finished 2nd, with the same number of points as Steaua București, the champions of that season. It was the best ranking in the club's history until then, but was followed by a 12th place in 1969, a 10th place in 1970 and a 9th place in 1971.

In the 1971–72 Divizia A season nothing could have predicted the final success of the team. In the first round the team debuted poorly, with a defeat (1–4) at SC Bacău, and the tension within the team led to the dismissal of coach Titus Ozon. In his place Florin Halagian was promoted, a young coach and former member of the team. At his debut as the youngest coach of Divizia A on 29 August 1971, the team won 2–1 against Rapid București, with both goals scored by Jercan. At the end of the first part of the championship, FC Argeş was in 4th place with 18 points, behind UTA Arad, SC Bacău and Universitatea Cluj. The winter preparations took place at Băile Herculane, followed by a strong tournament in East Germany, which helped the team a lot in the second part of the championship. In the second part, FC Argeș was defeated only twice (0–2, at home against Steagul Roșu Brașov and 0–1, at Cluj-Napoca, against CFR Cluj). These were followed by 9 games without defeats, with Halagian playing the high card several times. In the match against Politehnica Iași, he played each half with a different line of midfielders, to everyone's surprise, to force the victory and to have fresh players until the end. In the penultimate stage on 21 June 1972 at Pitești, FC Argeș defeated Crişul Oradea, becoming champion of Romania for the first time in its history, with one round before the end of the championship. The team played offensively and ambitiously, with an inspired Dobrin at the helm. The score was 4–1 (3–1) with the goals scored by Dobrin, Prepurgel, and M. Joita, and Tămaş scoring for Crișul. In front of over 17,000 spectators in the final round, FC Argeș defeated Dinamo București at 23 August Stadium with a score of 3–2, through the goals scored by Jercan, Constantin Radu, and Frățilă, with Lucescu and Dumitrache scoring for Dinamo.

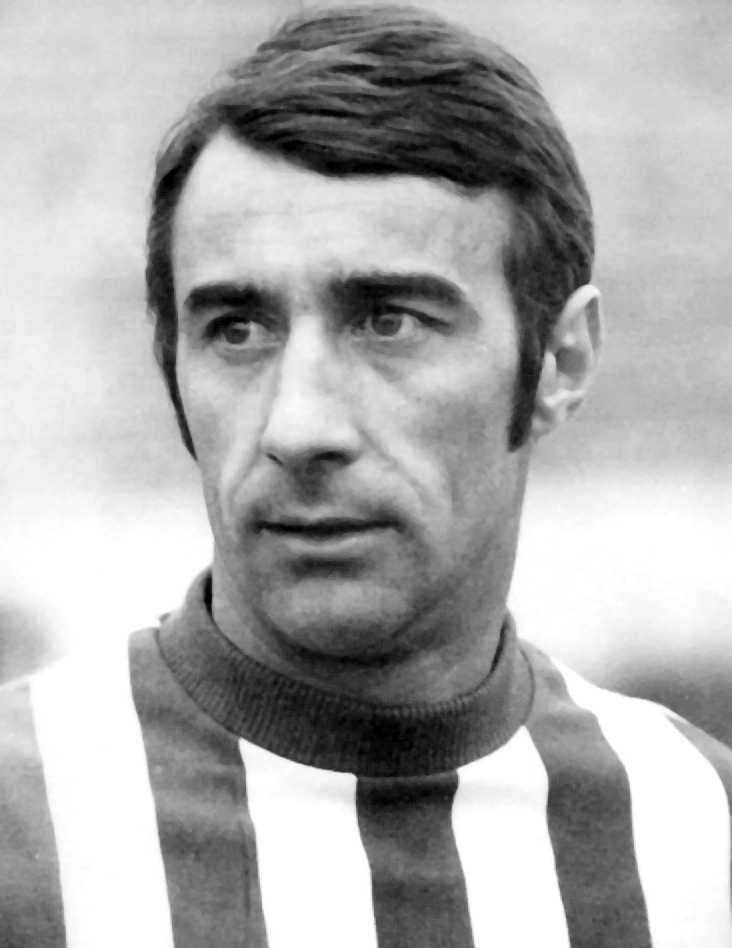
Ion Barbu captained and played over 200 league matches for FC Argeș.

FC Argeș's 1971–72 season line-up

Following their 1972 Divizia A title, FC Argeș played in the European Champion Clubs' Cup. In the first round the team eliminated their opponents without difficulty, beating Aris Bonnevoie from Luxembourg 6–0. Then in the second round they faced Real Madrid, a team with 6 Champions' Cups at the time and top players such as Pirri, Ignacio Zoco, Santillana, and Amancio, a legendary coach Miguel Muñoz and president Santiago Bernabéu. The match seemed like it would be a formality for Real Madrid, but on the pitch FC Argeș made probably the best match in its entire history, one which made Dobrin famous. He scored for 1–0 at 24 minutes, then Anzarda scored at 41 minutes, tying the game. Prepurgel then scored for 2–1 at 62 minutes, followed by several failed scoring opportunities against goalkeeper García Remón. Bernabéu, amazed by Dobrin's techniques, offered 2 million dollars and to pay for the installations of stadium floodlights for him, but Romanian leader Nicolae Ceaușescu refused. At Madrid, Real barely qualified with a goal scored at 87 minutes. The final score was 3–1, with Santillana (17 and 87 min) and Grande (47 min) scoring for Real, and Marin Radu (Radu II) scoring at 43 min for FC Argeș.

The following seasons were oscillating for the team which finished 3rd in 1973, 8th in 1974, and 7th in 1975, falling to 11th place in 1976 and 1977. In the 1977–78 Divizia A season the team had a remarkable comeback and finished 2nd, with the same number of points as the leader, Steaua București, as in 1968.

The 1978–79 Divizia A season began with the sign of good preparation and the desire to complete the maturation of the group of young players, most of whom grew up in Pitești. The team was still under the leadership of Coach Halagian, helped by Leonte lanovschi and Constantin Oţet, who transferred a few days before the start of the championship. The goal of the club's leadership was to occupy one of the top five places and to accumulate at least 18 points in the first championship round. FC Argeș started the championship strong, winning two games against Chimia Râmnicu Vâlcea and Politehnica Iași and ending up in a leading place. It was only in the 6th round when the club recorded its first defeat, 0–1 at Târgu Mureș against ASA Târgu Mureș. The players were subjected to double efforts, most of them being part of the Romanian Olympic team, which managed, after many years, to defeat the Hungarian team at Pitești. At the end of the first round, FC Argeş was in first place. A new player successfully debuted with the team, Moiceanu, who soon became a secret weapon for the team. In the last stage of the first round, FC Argeș won against Dinamo București 1–0, and became the champion of the round with 10 matches won, a draw and 6 defeats, 25 goals scored and 17 conceded, for a total of 21 points, three more than their objective at the start of the championship.

The well-known sports journalist Laurențiu Dumitrescu wrote in the Sportul newspaper,

... it was also in the autumn of [1978 that] Dobrin's team, the team of that highly talented player, who has been wearing the number 10 shirt for more than 15 years, the player capable – even at 31 years old – of deciding any match in our championship (testimonial examples: matches against FC Baia Mare, on their own ground, and against Steaua, away) to score spectacular goals. When Dobrin was absent, Iovănescu stepped in, an offensive midfielder who had an exceptional season, perhaps the best of his career. He also assumed the role of puncheur when the striker Radu II was injured. But it was also Stancu's turn, who became at only 22 years old, the mature leader of the defense, who combined the experience of Ivan II with the strength of Cârstea and the ambition of Mihai Zamfir.

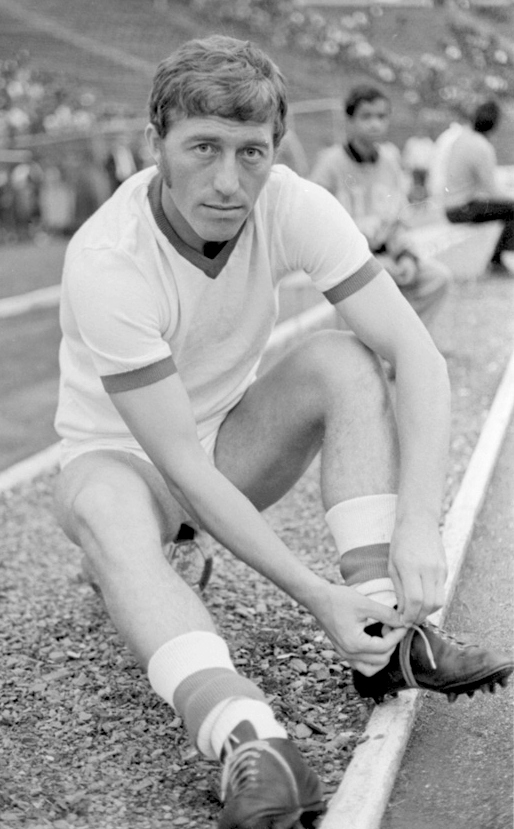
Nicolae Dobrin, club symbol and inaugural winner of the Romanian Footballer of the Year award

On 24 June 1979, in front of 20,000 spectators at Dinamo Stadium in Bucharest, FC Argeș defeated Dinamo 4–3 after a high-tension match, through goals scored by Radu II (11 and 24 min), Doru Nicolae (69 min) and Dobrin (90 min) respectively, with Marin Dragnea (6 min) and Dudu Georgescu (76 min from penalty and 89 min) scoring for Dinamo. This win brought FC Argeș the Romanian title for the second time in its history.

After the game, the well-known sports journalist Ioan Chirilă wrote in Sportul, "The championship final, awaited with extraordinary interest, which massively reduced the number of spectators on all the other grounds, ended with the well-deserved victory of the Pitești players after a high-tension game, in which the Dynamo team's thirst for victory received a veto from Dobrin, who offered the stands and viewers the countless matches of his life, he being the player who dominated the field from all points of view."

In the 1978–79 UEFA Cup FC Argeș eliminated Panathinaikos and went down with a fight against Valencia, with a score of 4–6 on aggregate. The club finished on the podium twice, in 1980 and 1981, but only in 10th place in 1982. Then in the summer of 1982, Dobrin at 35 years old left FC Argeș for CS Târgoviște. The team's performance wasn't greatly impacted and they finished 4th in 1983. The next summer Dobrin returned to FC Argeș, but played only 5 matches before retiring on 14 June 1983, after a match against Bihor Oradea, with the team finishing in 5th place.

=== After Nicolae Dobrin (1983–2009) ===
The retirement of Dobrin, the emblematic symbol of FC Argeș, also meant the end of great performances for the club. In the 1980s the team became mediocre, finishing frequently in 6th, 7th or 9th place, but still managed to reach three Balkans Cup finals in this period. At the end of the decade and the beginning of the next the team slipped even further, culminating in their relegation from Divizia A in 1992, after 29 years spent in the top league of Romanian football.

Relegated to Liga II and with financial problems FC Argeș was taken over by Dacia, whose director was Constantin Stroe, who paid the team's debts. The club was promoted back in 1994, finished 8th in 1995, but was again 5 points away from relegation in 1996. In the next season the team made a comeback to the middle of the standings.

The 1997–98 Divizia A season was the last peak of FC Argeș' history. The team finished 3rd and qualified for the 1998–99 UEFA Cup, where they eliminated teams like Dynamo Baku and İstanbulspor but were easily eliminated by Celta de Vigo 0–8 on aggregate. This last presence in European Cups was due to a formidable generation, the second most talented after Dobrin's. The team included the players Adrian Mutu, Bogdan Vintilă, Valentin Năstase, Iulian Crivac, Constantin Schumacher, and Constantin Barbu.

The team continued its good performance, finishing 4th in 1999, then in 5th place in 2000 and 2001. From 2002 on the team was a constant presence in the second half of the leaderboard, finishing at most in 10th place. This period ended with the second relegation in the club's history, this time after 13 years, at the end of the 2006–07 Liga I season. The team was promoted back after only one season in Liga II.

=== The Romanian Calciopoli and Bankruptcy (2009–2013) ===
The team finished 8th in their first season after the promotion, a season with good results and a solid playing style. Then on 8 June 2009, they were relegated to Liga II, after the National Anti-Corruption Division found that the owner of the team from that period, Cornel Penescu, tried to bribe referees to benefit the team in matches. This case was called the "Penescu Case" or the "Romanian Calciopoli" by the press.

After Penescu's arrest, his son Andrei led the club, but the funding was practically non-existent and the club struggled to survive even in Liga II, finishing in the second half of the standings. Then on 26 July 2013 it was announced that FC Argeș was bankrupt without any chance of rescue.

=== SCM Pitești and supporters' club (2013–2017) ===
After the bankruptcy of FC Argeș, the people of Pitești tried to bring football back to life. Their first project was Sport Club Municipal (SCM) Pitești, a project initiated by Pitești City Council which created a football section at the sporting club of the municipality in 2011, 2 years before the end of FC Argeș, anticipating the bankruptcy of the club led at that time by Penescu's son and burdened with debt. The team was promoted to Liga III after only one season and remained at that level until 2017 when they were promoted to Liga II.

The supporters of FC Argeș encouraged the team until the very end, then after the bankruptcy founded FC Argeș 1953 Piteşti, a phoenix club fully owned by FC Argeș supporters. The club won the 2015–16 Liga IV for Argeș County and the promotion play-off match 5–2 against Recolta Stoicănești, Olt County champion, but were unable to join Liga III due to a lack of funds and dissolved their senior team.

Pitești City Council offered to buy the FC Argeș brand, and the fans running FC Argeș 1953 supported this initiative.

=== Rebirth and return to Liga I (2017–present) ===
On 16 June 2017, the Municipality of Pitești bought FC Argeș's brand for 550,000 RON. As a result of this association, the brand was transferred to SCM Pitești's football section, newly promoted to Liga II, and the team came back to life four years after it was declared bankrupt. After promotion, the team spent 3 years in the second league. FC Argeș managed to earn promotion to the first division at the end of the 2019–20 season, after an 11-year break. The team narrowly earned 2nd place, after Rapid București held Turris-Oltul Turnu Măgurele to a draw in the seventh minute of extra time, a score at which Turris remained in the second league, and FC Argeș was promoted directly.

In the first half of their comeback season, FC Argeș failed to impress, their winless streak leaving them in last place in the league at the beginning of 2021. Things began to change after former player Andrei Prepeliță took over as manager, with the team recording an 11-game winning streak and slowly crawling out of the relegation places to join the fight for a play-off spot. With their unbeaten streak cut short by a 0–5 defeat against reigning champions CFR Cluj, FC Argeș kept their momentum but never made it above 7th place. They missed a chance to make it through with a 1–1 draw against fellow play-off contenders Academica Clinceni and by the penultimate round, they missed play-off qualification altogether following a 1–4 loss against Hermannstadt.

In the 2021–22 season, FC Argeș managed to secure a play-off spot on the final day of the regular season, finishing 4th after a 2–1 away win against FC Botoșani, eventually finishing 6th, the team's highest finish in years, the team including players Alexandru Greab, Andrei Tofan, Grigore Turda, David Meza and Alexandru Ișfan.

In the 2022–23 season, FC Argeș went into chaos, head coach Andrei Prepeliță was sacked in October, and the team eventually finished 14th, being relegated after a 8–5 loss on aggregate to FC Dinamo București in the relegation play-offs, even losing 6–1 in the first leg. Thus a large part of the team's core left. The team continued on the bad way in the 2023–24 season, finishing 14th.

The team turned its misfortunes around in the 2024–25 season under coach Bogdan Andone, when the team not only won promotion, but also won the title, returning to Liga I next season.

== Youth program ==
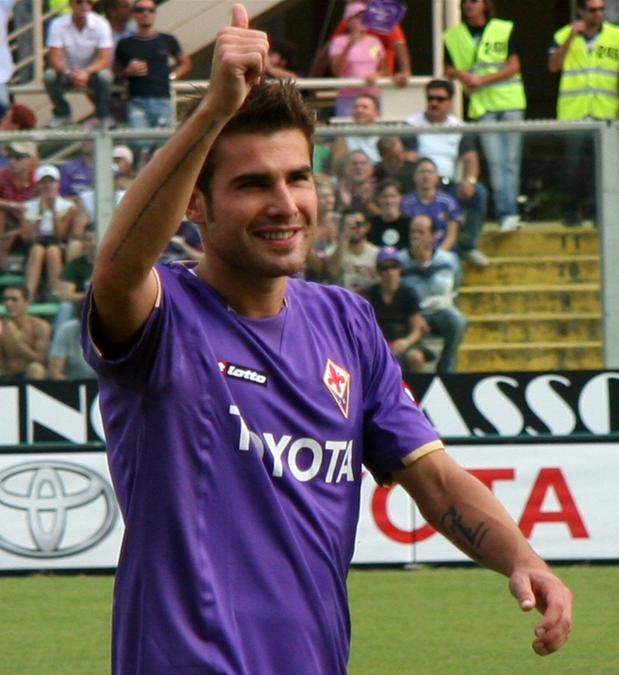
Adrian Mutu (pictured at Fiorentina) is one of the most valuable exports of the FC Argeș academy.

Some notable names of Romanian football were developed in the youth academy of FC Argeș, such as Nicolae Dobrin, Adrian Mutu, Ilie Bărbulescu, Marius Bilașco, Constantin Cârstea, Dănuț Coman, Iulian Crivac, Emil Dică, Valentin Năstase, Adrian Neaga, Marin Radu, Bogdan Stancu, Cristian Tănase, Constantin Stancu and Ion Vlădoiu.

== Stadium ==
The club plays its home matches in Nicolae Dobrin Stadium in Pitești. The stadium has a capacity of 15,000 seats, the biggest in Argeș County. The stadium is closed for renovations, so the club plays its matches at the Orășenesc Stadium in Mioveni at the moment.

== Support ==
FC Argeș has many supporters in Romania and especially in Argeș County. The ultra groups of FC Argeș are Violet Republic, Brigada Vulturii București and Frați de weekend.

=== Rivalries ===
FC Argeș does not have any significant rivalries, but one is with Dinamo București and another is against local team CS Mioveni, with the town of Mioveni being only 15 kilometres (9.3 mi) away from Pitești.

== Honours ==
=== Domestic ===
Chart of FC Argeș Pitești's league performance 1956–2017

==== Leagues ====
- Divizia A / Liga I
  - Winners (2): 1971–72, 1978–79
  - Runners-up (2): 1967–68, 1977–78
- Divizia B / Liga II
  - Winners (5): 1960–61, 1962–63, 1993–94, 2007–08, 2024–25
  - Runners-up (1): 2019–20
- Liga III
  - Winners (1): 2016–17 (Note: Result achieved by the football department of SCM Pitești prior to acquiring the FC Argeș brand in 2017.)
  - Runners-up (1): 2015–16
- Liga IV – Argeș County
  - Winners (1): 2011–12

==== Cups ====
- Cupa României
  - Runners-up (1): 1964–65

=== European ===
- Balkans Cup
  - Runners-up (3): 1983–84, 1984–85, 1987–88

== Players ==
=== First-team squad ===
As of 10 October 2026

Note: Flags indicate national team as defined under FIFA eligibility rules; some limited exceptions apply. Players may hold more than one non-FIFA nationality.

No.	Pos.	Nation	Player
1	GK	ROU	Cătălin Straton (Vice-captain)
2	DF	ROU	Andrei Tofan (Captain)
3	DF	KOS	Leard Sadriu
6	DF	ROU	Mario Tudose (3rd captain)
8	FW	SEN	Mamadou Mendy
9	FW	CGO	Gabriel Charpentier
11	MF	ROU	Yanis Pîrvu (4th captain)
14	MF	ROU	Ciprian Bălașa
15	DF	BRA	Guilherme Garutti
16	MF	ROU	Ionuț Rădescu
17	FW	POR	Ricardo Matos
18	FW	ROU	Daniel Sandu
19	MF	ROU	Claudiu Micovschi
20	FW	ROU	Patrick Dulcea

No.	Pos.	Nation	Player
22	MF	MDA	Vadim Rață
23	DF	ROU	Florin Borța
25	DF	POR	Tiago Gonçalves
26	DF	ROU	Dorinel Oancea
27	FW	ESP	Rober Sierra
29	MF	ROU	Gabriel Gheorghe
31	GK	ROU	Matteo Șerban
34	GK	ROU	Cătălin Căbuz
69	MF	NGR	Oluwatobiloba Alagbe
77	GK	MNE	Igor Nikić
80	MF	BEL	Xian Emmers
92	FW	FRA	Taylor Luvambo
96	MF	ROU	Silviu Balaure
99	FW	ROU	Robert Moldoveanu

=== Other players under contract ===
Note: Flags indicate national team as defined under FIFA eligibility rules; some limited exceptions apply. Players may hold more than one non-FIFA nationality.

No. / Pos. / Nation / Player; 7 / MF / NGR / Michael Idowu	No. / Pos. / Nation / Player; — / MF / ROU / Robert Popescu

=== Out on loan ===
Note: Flags indicate national team as defined under FIFA eligibility rules; some limited exceptions apply. Players may hold more than one non-FIFA nationality.

No.	Pos.	Nation	Player
28	DF	ROU	Claudiu Stancu (at CSM Slatina until 30 June 2027)
33	GK	ROU	Luca Crăciun (at SCM Râmnicu Vâlcea until 30 June 2027)
82	DF	ROU	Antonio Marin (at Oxigen București until 30 June 2027)
—	MF	ROU	Eduard Cotea (at Unirea Dej until 30 June 2027)

No.	Pos.	Nation	Player
—	MF	ROU	Alexandru Dinoci (at Unirea Bascov until 30 June 2027)
—	MF	ROU	Rareș Velea (at CSM Slatina until 30 June 2027)
—	FW	ROU	Eric Nistor (at SCM Râmnicu Vâlcea until 30 June 2027)
—	FW	ROU	Mario Oprea (at ARO Câmpulung until 30 June 2027)

=== Retired numbers ===
Note: Flags indicate national team as defined under FIFA eligibility rules; some limited exceptions apply. Players may hold more than one non-FIFA nationality.

No.	Pos.	Nation	Player
10	MF	ROU	Nicolae Dobrin (1962–1981, 1982–1983 – Posthumous honour)

== Club officials ==
=== Board of officials ===
Role	Name
Owner	(Romania) Pitești Municipality
Honorary President	(Romania) Cristian Gentea
President	(Romania) Dănuț Coman
Club manager	(Romania) Robert Avram
Board members	(Romania) Octavian Lupu (Romania) Daniel Janță
Sporting director	(Romania) Sorin Boiangiu
Marketing Director	(Romania) Răzvan Radu
Image Director	(Romania) Daniel Stanciu
Head of Scouting	(Romania) Marian Bondrea
Head of Youth Development	(Romania) Marius Pavel
Team Manager	(Romania) Mirel Bolboașă
Press officer	(Romania) Cristian Mitrache

- Last updated: 18 January 2026

=== Current technical staff ===
Role	Name
Head coach	(Romania) Bogdan Andone
Assistant coaches	(Romania) Alexandru Ungurianu (Romania) Cristian Tănase
Goalkeeping coach	(Romania) Ionuț Boșneag
Fitness coach	(Italy) Massimo Stalteri
Video analyst	(Romania) Cosmin Ion
Club doctor	(Romania) Dragoș Șerb
Physiotherapist	(Romania) Ionuț Hristache
Masseurs	(Romania) Eugen Păsărică (Romania) Valentin Melu
Storeman	(Romania) Sorinel Roșu

- Last updated: 17 June 2026

== European record ==
Competition	S	P	W	D	L	GF	GA	GD
UEFA Champions League (European Cup)	2	8	4	0	4	13	10	+3
UEFA Europa League (UEFA Cup)	5	18	7	4	7	29	34	−5
Total	7	26	11	4	11	42	44	−2

Notable wins

Season	Match	Score
European Fairs Cup
1966–67	FC Argeș – (Spain) Sevilla	2 – 0
1967–68	FC Argeș – (Hungary) Ferencváros	3 – 1
European Cup / Champions League
1972–73	FC Argeș – (Spain) Real Madrid	2 – 1
1979–80	FC Argeș – (Greece) AEK Athens	3 – 0
UEFA Cup / Europa League
1978–79	FC Argeș – (Greece) Panathinaikos	3 – 0
1978–79	FC Argeș – (Spain) Valencia	2 – 1
Balkans Cup
1983–84	FC Argeș – (Turkey) Galatasaray	2 – 0

== League history ==
Season	Tier	Division	Place	Notes	Cupa României
2026–27	1	Liga I	TBD		TBD
2025–26	1	Liga I	6th		Semi-finals
2024–25	2	Liga II	1st (C, P)	Promoted	Group stage
2023–24	2	Liga II	14th		Play-off round
2022–23	1	Liga I	14th (R)	Relegated	Quarter-finals
2021–22	1	Liga I	6th		Semi-finals
2020–21	1	Liga I	11th		Round of 32
2019–20	2	Liga II	2nd (P)	Promoted	Fourth round
2018–19	2	Liga II	6th		Fourth round
2017–18	2	Liga II	4th		Round of 32
2016–17	3	Liga III (Seria III)	1st (C, P)	Promoted	Fourth round
2015–16	3	Liga III (Seria III)	2nd		Fourth round
2014–15	3	Liga III (Seria III)	6th		Second round
2013–14	3	Liga III (Seria VI)	3rd		Fourth round
2012–13	2	Liga II (Seria II)	9th	Bankruptcy	Fourth round
2011–12	2	Liga II (Seria II)	10th		Fifth round
2010–11	2	Liga II (Seria II)	12th		Fifth round
2009–10	2	Liga II (Seria II)	5th		Fourth round
2008–09	1	Liga I	10th (R)	Relegated	Round of 32

Season	Tier	Division	Place	Notes	Cupa României
2007–08	2	Liga II (Seria II)	1st (C, P)	Promoted	Fifth round
2006–07	1	Liga I	17th (R)	Relegated	Quarter-finals
2005–06	1	Divizia A	12th		Round of 32
2004–05	1	Divizia A	10th		Quarter-finals
2003–04	1	Divizia A	10th		Semi-finals
2002–03	1	Divizia A	11th		Semi-finals
2001–02	1	Divizia A	10th		Round of 16
2000–01	1	Divizia A	5th		Round of 16
1999–00	1	Divizia A	5th		Round of 16
1998–99	1	Divizia A	4th		Round of 32
1997–98	1	Divizia A	3rd		Semi-finals
1996–97	1	Divizia A	7th		Round of 32
1995–96	1	Divizia A	16th		Quarter-finals
1994–95	1	Divizia A	8th		Round of 32
1993–94	2	Divizia B (Seria I)	1st (C, P)	Promoted	Semi-finals
1992–93	2	Divizia B (Seria I)	3rd		
1991–92	1	Divizia A	16th (R)	Relegated	Round of 32
1990–91	1	Divizia A	8th		Quarter-finals
1989–90	1	Divizia A	12th		Round of 32

== Notable former players ==
The footballers enlisted below have had international cap(s) for their respective countries at a senior level or at least 100 cap(s) for FC Argeș.

One-club men

- (Romania) Constantin Cârstea
- (Romania) Petre Ivan
- (Romania) Constantin Olteanu
- (Romania) Constantin Stancu

Romania

- (Romania) Cristian Albeanu
- (Romania) Bogdan Bănuță
- (Romania) Constantin Barbu
- (Romania) Ion Barbu
- (Romania) Cristian Bălașa
- (Romania) Ilie Bărbulescu
- (Romania) Marius Bilașco
- (Romania) Marius Briceag
- (Romania) Gheorghe Cacoveanu
- (Romania) Ion Ceaușu
- (Romania) Augustin Chiriță
- (Romania) Alin Chița
- (Romania) Dănuț Coman
- (Romania) Narcis Coman
- (Romania) Iulian Crivac
- (Romania) Cristian Dancia
- (Romania) Nicolae Dică
- (Romania) Nicolae Diță
- (Romania) Nicolae Dobrin
- (Romania) Cătălin Doman
- (Romania) Adrian Dulcea
- (Romania) Augustin Eduard
- (Romania) Constantin Frățilă
- (Romania) Constantin Gâlcă
- (Romania) Ionel Gane
- (Romania) Ion Geolgău
- (Romania) Adrian Iordache
- (Romania) Sevastian Iovănescu
- (Romania) Dumitru Ivan
- (Romania) Radu Jercan
- (Romania) Dan Lăcustă
- (Romania) Bogdan Mara
- (Romania) Andrei Mărgăritescu
- (Romania) Cornel Mirea
- (Romania) Viorel Moiceanu
- (Romania) Dorinel Munteanu
- (Romania) Alexandru Mustățea
- (Romania) Adrian Mutu
- (Romania) Nicolae Nagy
- (Romania) Valentin Năstase
- (Romania) Cosmin Năstăsie
- (Romania) Ionuț Năstăsie
- (Romania) Adrian Neaga
- (Romania) Cătălin Necula
- (Romania) Spiridon Niculescu
- (Romania) Marian Pană
- (Romania) Cornel Pavlovici
- (Romania) Marcel Pigulea
- (Romania) Ilie Poenaru
- (Romania) Vasile Popa
- (Romania) Marian Popescu
- (Romania) Ștefan Preda
- (Romania) Marius Predatu
- (Romania) Andrei Prepeliță
- (Romania) Ion Prepurgel
- (Romania) Constantin Radu
- (Romania) Marin Radu
- (Romania) Marius Radu
- (Romania) Ion Roșu
- (Romania) Emil Săndoi
- (Romania) Constantin Schumacher
- (Romania) Dănuț Șomcherechi
- (Romania) Andrei Speriatu
- (Romania) Mircea Stan
- (Romania) Vasile Stan
- (Romania) Bogdan Stancu
- (Romania) Ionuț Șerban
- (Romania) Daniel Șerbănică
- (Romania) Dorian Ștefan
- (Romania) Iulian Tameș
- (Romania) Ciprian Tănasă
- (Romania) Cristian Tănase
- (Romania) Florin Tene
- (Romania) Ion Țîrcovnicu
- (Romania) Doru Toma
- (Romania) Radu Troi
- (Romania) Mihai Țurcan
- (Romania) Grigore Turda
- (Romania) Iosif Varga
- (Romania) Ion Vlădoiu
- (Romania) Bogdan Vintilă
- (Romania) Remus Vlad
- (Romania) Dorel Zamfir
- (Romania) Mihai Zamfir

Argentina

- (Argentina) Elias Bazzi

Bosnia and Herzegovina

- (Bosnia and Herzegovina) Adnan Gušo

Bulgaria

- (Bulgaria) Martin Raynov

Cameroon

- (Cameroon) Arnold Garita

Croatia

- (Croatia) Antun Palić

Equatorial Guinea

- (Equatorial Guinea) Esteban Orozco

Japan

- (Japan) Takayuki Seto

Madagascar

- (Madagascar) Dorian Bertrand

Paraguay

- (Paraguay) David Meza

Tunisia

- (Tunisia) Adel Bettaieb

== Former managers ==
- (Romania) Ion Lăpușneanu (1953–1954)
- (Romania) Ion Lăpușneanu (1955–1956)
- (Romania) Vasile Ștefan (1956–1957)
- (Romania) Gheorghe Teodorescu (1957–1958)
- (Romania) Ion Lăpușneanu (1958–1959)
- (Romania) Vasile Ștefan (1959–1961)
- (Romania) Virgil Mărdărescu (1963–1965)
- (Romania) Vasile Ștefan (1965–1967)
- (Romania) Eugen Mladin (1969)
- (Romania) Constantin Teașcă (1969–1970)
- (Romania) Bazil Marian (1970)
- (Romania) Titus Ozon (1971)
- (Romania) Florin Halagian (1971–1973)
- (Romania) Ștefan Coidum (1973–1974)
- (Romania) Florin Halagian (1974–1981)
- (Romania) Constantin Cârstea (1985)
- (Romania) Florin Halagian (1985–1988)
- (Romania) Nicolae Dumitru (1988–1989)
- (Romania) Alexandru Moldovan (1989)
- (Romania) Ion Nunweiller (1990)
- (Romania) Constantin Stancu (1990)
- (Romania) Constantin Cârstea (1990–1991)
- (Romania) Constantin Stancu (1992)
- (Romania) Mihai Zamfir (1993)
- (Romania) Ion Moldovan (1993–1994)
- (Romania) Marian Bondrea (1994–1995)
- (Romania) Constantin Stancu (1995)
- (Romania) Constantin Cârstea (1995–1996)
- (Romania) Ion Moldovan (1996–1997)
- (Romania) Silviu Dumitrescu (1997–1998)
- (Romania) Nicolae Dobrin (1998–1999)
- (Romania) Mihai Zamfir (1999)
- (Romania) Florin Halagian (1999–2000)
- (Romania) Marian Bondrea (2000–2001)
- (Romania) Nicolae Dobrin (2001)
- (Romania) Florin Halagian (2001–2002)
- (Romania) Vasile Stan (2002)
- (Romania) Mario Marinică (2003)
- (Romania) Ion Moldovan (2002–2004)
- (Romania) Sorin Cârțu (2005–2006)
- (Romania) Vasile Stan (2006)
- (Italy) Giuseppe Giannini (2006–2007)
- (Romania) Constantin Cârstea (2007)
- (Romania) Ionuț Badea (2007–2009)
- (Romania) Mihai Zamfir (2010)
- (Romania) Ion Vlădoiu (2010)
- (Romania) Iulian Crivac (2012–2013)
- (Romania) Valentin Sinescu (2013–2014)
- (Romania) Adrian Dulcea (2014–2015)
- (Romania) Nicolae Dică (2015–2017)
- (Romania) Constantin Schumacher (2015)
- (Romania) Adrian Neaga (2015)
- (Romania) Emil Săndoi (2017–2019)
- (Romania) Augustin Eduard (2019)
- (Romania) Nicolae Dică (2019)
- (Romania) Ionuț Badea (2019–2020)
- (Romania) Ionuț Moșteanu (2020)
- (Romania) Adrian Dulcea (2020)
- (Romania) Andrei Prepeliță (2020–2022)
- (Romania) Marius Croitoru (2022–2023)
- (Romania) Bogdan Vintilă (2023)
- (Romania) Eugen Neagoe (2023–2024)
- (Romania) Nicolae Dică (2024)
