= 1971–72 Divizia A =

54th season of top-tier football league in Romania

Divizia A
- Season: 1971–72
- Champions: Argeș Pitești
- Top goalscorer: Ion Oblemenco (20)

The 1971–72 Divizia A was the fifty-fourth season of Divizia A, the top-level football league of Romania.

== Teams ==
Location of teams in 1971-72 Divizia A

== League table ==
| Pos | Team | Pld | W | D | L | GF | GA | GD | Pts | Qualification or relegation |
|---|---|---|---|---|---|---|---|---|---|---|
| 1 | Argeș Pitești (C) | 30 | 19 | 3 | 8 | 51 | 35 | +16 | 41 | Qualification to European Cup first round |
| 2 | UTA Arad | 30 | 15 | 7 | 8 | 51 | 29 | +22 | 37 | Qualification to UEFA Cup first round |
| 3 | Universitatea Cluj | 30 | 16 | 5 | 9 | 39 | 27 | +12 | 37 | Qualification to UEFA Cup first round |
| 4 | ASA Târgu Mureș | 30 | 14 | 7 | 9 | 35 | 30 | +5 | 35 | Invitation to Balkans Cup |
| 5 | Steagul Roşu Brașov | 30 | 13 | 8 | 9 | 37 | 21 | +16 | 34 | |
| 6 | SC Bacău | 30 | 14 | 4 | 12 | 41 | 41 | 0 | 32 | |
| 7 | Dinamo București | 30 | 12 | 7 | 11 | 46 | 36 | +10 | 31 | |
| 8 | Universitatea Craiova | 30 | 13 | 5 | 12 | 42 | 35 | +7 | 31 | |
| 9 | Steaua București | 30 | 11 | 8 | 11 | 36 | 27 | +9 | 30 | |
| 10 | Rapid București | 30 | 13 | 4 | 13 | 40 | 39 | +1 | 30 | Qualification to Cup Winners' Cup first round |
| 11 | Farul Constanța | 30 | 9 | 9 | 12 | 28 | 38 | −10 | 27 | |
| 12 | Jiul Petroșani | 30 | 10 | 7 | 13 | 26 | 38 | −12 | 27 | |
| 13 | CFR Cluj | 30 | 9 | 7 | 14 | 27 | 37 | −10 | 25 | |
| 14 | Petrolul Ploiești | 30 | 9 | 7 | 14 | 23 | 40 | −17 | 25 | |
| 15 | Politehnica Iași (R) | 30 | 6 | 12 | 12 | 30 | 42 | −12 | 24 | Relegation to Divizia B |
| 16 | Crişul Oradea (R) | 30 | 3 | 8 | 19 | 17 | 54 | −37 | 14 | Relegation to Divizia B |

Source: LT
Rules for classification: 1) points; 2) goal difference; 3) number of goals scored
(C) Champions; (R) Relegated

=== Results ===
| Home \ Away | ASA | ARG | BAC | CFR | UCR | CRI | DIN | FAR | JIU | PET | PIA | RAP | SRB | STE | UTA | UCL |
|---|---|---|---|---|---|---|---|---|---|---|---|---|---|---|---|---|
| ASA Târgu Mureș | — | 3–0 | 3–2 | 1–0 | 0–0 | 3–1 | 0–0 | 0–0 | 2–0 | 3–0 | 3–1 | 3–0 | 3–1 | 1–0 | 0–0 | 1–0 |
| Argeș Pitești | 1–0 | — | 3–1 | 2–1 | 4–2 | 4–1 | 3–2 | 3–0 | 2–0 | 5–0 | 2–0 | 2–1 | 0–2 | 2–1 | 2–1 | 0–0 |
| Bacău | 1–0 | 4–1 | — | 4–1 | 3–0 | 0–0 | 3–1 | 3–1 | 1–0 | 0–1 | 3–1 | 1–0 | 0–2 | 1–0 | 4–2 | 1–0 |
| CFR Cluj | 1–1 | 1–0 | 1–0 | — | 1–0 | 2–0 | 1–3 | 3–1 | 1–2 | 1–0 | 2–2 | 0–1 | 0–0 | 2–1 | 0–0 | 0–1 |
| Universitatea Craiova | 2–0 | 1–2 | 3–0 | 2–2 | — | 2–0 | 2–1 | 2–0 | 4–0 | 3–0 | 5–0 | 3–0 | 1–0 | 2–1 | 2–0 | 0–1 |
| Crișul Oradea | 0–1 | 0–1 | 1–2 | 1–0 | 2–1 | — | 3–3 | 1–1 | 0–0 | 0–0 | 0–0 | 1–0 | 0–0 | 1–2 | 1–2 | 2–3 |
| Dinamo București | 1–2 | 2–3 | 6–0 | 0–0 | 3–0 | 3–1 | — | 0–0 | 3–0 | 1–1 | 1–0 | 1–0 | 2–2 | 1–0 | 1–1 | 3–2 |
| Farul Constanța | 1–0 | 0–0 | 1–1 | 1–0 | 2–1 | 4–1 | 1–0 | — | 1–0 | 1–1 | 2–2 | 2–2 | 2–0 | 1–0 | 3–1 | 0–1 |
| Jiul Petroșani | 0–0 | 1–1 | 0–0 | 1–0 | 3–0 | 2–0 | 2–1 | 2–2 | — | 2–0 | 2–0 | 0–1 | 1–0 | 1–1 | 1–1 | 3–0 |
| Petrolul Ploiești | 5–0 | 1–2 | 2–1 | 0–1 | 1–1 | 1–0 | 2–0 | 1–0 | 0–1 | — | 0–0 | 1–0 | 0–0 | 0–2 | 0–2 | 1–0 |
| Politehnica Iași | 2–0 | 0–1 | 1–1 | 2–4 | 1–1 | 0–0 | 0–1 | 3–1 | 3–0 | 0–1 | — | 2–2 | 1–0 | 2–0 | 1–0 | 1–1 |
| Rapid București | 1–0 | 0–2 | 1–2 | 3–1 | 2–0 | 7–0 | 2–1 | 1–0 | 5–1 | 2–0 | 1–0 | — | 1–5 | 2–1 | 1–1 | 1–0 |
| Steagul Roşu Brașov | 3–1 | 2–1 | 2–0 | 2–0 | 0–1 | 1–0 | 2–1 | 3–0 | 1–0 | 3–0 | 0–0 | 5–1 | — | 0–0 | 0–1 | 1–1 |
| Steaua București | 1–0 | 2–1 | 2–1 | 1–1 | 1–1 | 4–0 | 0–1 | 2–0 | 3–0 | 3–0 | 1–1 | 2–1 | 0–0 | — | 1–0 | 2–0 |
| UTA Arad | 5–1 | 4–0 | 2–0 | 4–0 | 3–0 | 1–0 | 1–2 | 1–0 | 4–1 | 4–2 | 4–1 | 1–1 | 2–0 | 2–2 | — | 1–0 |
| Universitatea Cluj | 1–2 | 2–1 | 3–1 | 1–0 | 2–0 | 4–0 | 2–1 | 3–0 | 1–0 | 2–2 | 3–3 | 1–0 | 1–0 | 1–0 | 2–0 | — |

Source: LT (in Romanian)
Legend: Blue = home team win; Yellow = draw; Red = away team win.

== Top goalscorers ==
| Rank | Player | Club | Goals |
|---|---|---|---|
| 1 | Ion Oblemenco | Universitatea Craiova | 20 |
| 2 | Alexandru Neagu | Rapid București | 16 |
| 3 | Nicolae Dobrin | Argeș Pitești | 15 |
| 4 | Attila Kun | UTA Arad | 12 |
| 4 | Nicolae Pescaru | Steagul Roșu Brașov | 12 |

== Champion squad ==
Argeș Pitești

Goalkeepers: Daniel Ariciu (1 / 0); Vasile Stan (29 / 0); Spiridon Niculescu (1 / 0).
Defenders: Marcel Pigulea (27 / 0); Dumitru Ciolan (16 / 0); Ion Barbu (16 / 0); Constantin Olteanu (20 / 1); Remus Vlad (30 / 0); Petre Ivan (29 / 0); Constantin Nedelcu (1 / 0).
Midfielders: Ion Prepurgel (28 / 4); Marian Popescu (30 / 2); Ștefan Dumitru (7 / 0).
Forwards: Ion Dobrescu (16 / 1); Constantin Radu (27 / 9); Ion Roșu (17 / 4); Nicolae Dobrin (23 / 15); Radu Jercan (29 / 8); Emil Dumitru (9 / 0); Mihai Ciornoavă (2 / 0); Constantin Frățilă (17 / 7).
(league appearances and goals listed in brackets)

Manager: Titus Ozon / Florin Halagian.

== See also ==
- 1971–72 Divizia B
- 1971–72 Divizia C
- 1971–72 County Championship
