= Iulian Crivac =

Romanian footballer

Personal information
- Full name: Iulian Crivac
- Date of birth: 4 July 1976 (age 50)
- Place of birth: Pitești, Romania
- Height: 1.79 m (5 ft 10 in)
- Positions: Defender; midfielder

Youth career
- CSȘ Aripi Pitești

Senior career*
Years	Team	Apps	(Gls)
1994–1999	Argeș Pitești	145	(11)
2000–2001	Rapid București	14	(0)
2001–2004	Argeș Pitești	43	(2)
2004	Dacia Mioveni	2	(0)
2005–2006	Argeș Pitești	32	(0)
2006	Dacia Mioveni	2	(0)
2006–2008	Argeș Pitești	28	(2)
Total		266	(15)

International career
2000	Romania	2	(0)

Managerial career
- 2012–2013: Argeș Pitești
- 2013–2014: Argeș Pitești (assistant)
- 2017: Argeș Pitești (assistant)
- 2023–2024: Unirea Bascov (assistant)
- 2024–: Unirea Bascov U19
- * Club domestic league appearances and goals

Iulian Crivac (born 4 July 1976) is a retired Romanian footballer who played as a left defender, left midfielder and central defensive midfielder. After he ended his playing career, he worked as a manager.

== International career ==
Iulian Crivac played two friendly games at the Cyprus International Football Tournament for Romania, making his debut under coach Emerich Jenei in a 2–0 victory against Latvia. His second game was a 1–1 (5–3, after penalty kicks) victory against Georgia.

== Honours ==
=== Player ===
Argeș Pitești

- Liga II: 2007–08
