= Michael Idowu =

Nigerian footballer (born 2006)

Personal information
- Date of birth: 23 August 2006 (age 20)
- Place of birth: Lagos, Nigeria
- Height: 1.71 m (5 ft 7 in)
- Position: Right winger

Team information
- Current team: Argeș Pitești
- Number: 7

Youth career
- –2026: Jimmy Football Academy

Senior career*
Years	Team	Apps	(Gls)
2026–	Argeș Pitești	8	(0)
- * Club domestic league appearances and goals as of 18 September 2026

Michael Idowu (born 23 August 2006) is a Nigerian professional footballer who plays as a right winger for Liga I club Argeș Pitești.

== Career statistics ==
As of match played 28 October 2026

Appearances and goals by club, season and competition
Club	Season	League			Cupa României		Europe		Other		Total	
Club	Season	Division	Apps	Goals	Apps	Goals	Apps	Goals	Apps	Goals	Apps	Goals
Argeș Pitești	2025–26	Liga I	4	0	0	0	—		—		4	0
Argeș Pitești	2026–27	Liga I	4	0	1	0	—		—		5	0
Career total			8	0	1	0	—		—		9	0
