= Radu Jercan =

Romanian footballer

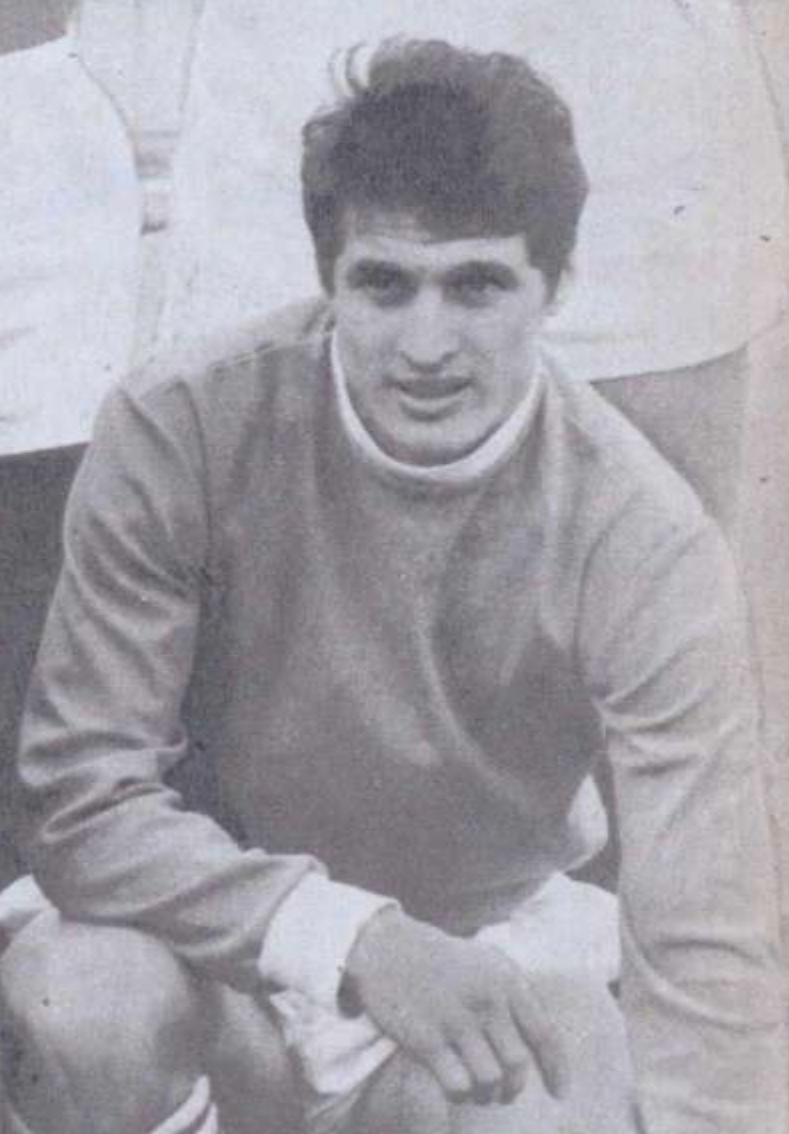
- Jercan with Argeș Pitești in 1969

Personal information
- Date of birth: 24 October 1945
- Place of birth: Popești-Leordeni, Romania
- Date of death: 29 September 2012 (aged 66)
- Place of death: Popești-Leordeni, Romania
- Height: 1.69 m (5 ft 7 in)
- Position: Forward

Senior career*
| Years | Team | Apps | (Gls) |
| 1966–1967 | Dinamo Victoria București | | |
| 1967–1976 | Argeș Pitești | 247 | (27) |
| 1976–1978 | Muscelul Câmpulung | | |

International career
| 1972 | Romania | 2 | (0) |

Managerial career
- 1978–1979: ȘN Oltenița
- 1980–1981: CS Târgoviște (assistant)
- Muscelul Câmpulung
- Chimia Găești
- Textila Roșiori
- IUPS Chitila
- * Club domestic league appearances and goals

Radu Jercan (24 October 1945 – 29 September 2012) was a Romanian football forward and manager.

== Club career ==
Jercan was born on 24 October 1945 in Popești-Leordeni, Romania and began playing football in 1966 at Divizia B side, Dinamo Victoria București.

One year later, Jercan joined Argeș Pitești where on 20 August 1967 he made his Divizia A debut under coach Ion Bălănescu in a 2–0 home loss to Rapid București. He started playing in European competitions during the 1967–68 Inter-Cities Fairs Cup, scoring a goal in a victory over Ferencváros, and in the following edition he scored in a win against Göztepe, but on both occasions Argeș was eliminated on the aggregate result. In the 1971–72 season he formed a successful offensive trio with Nicolae Dobrin and Constantin Radu that helped Argeș win the first title in its history. Jercan netted a personal record of eight goals in the 29 appearances under coaches Titus Ozon and Florin Halagian, including a brace in Halagian's first game as coach, a 2–1 win over Rapid București. Afterwards he played three games in the 1972–73 European Cup, eliminating Aris Bonnevoie in the first round, then in the following one they won a home game with 2–1 against Real Madrid, but lost the second leg with 3–1. Jercan's last Divizia A appearance took place on 13 June 1976 in a 7–1 away loss to Dinamo București, totaling 247 matches with 27 goals in the competition and 11 games with two goals in European competitions (including six games with two goals in the Inter-Cities Fairs Cup).

In 1976, Jercan went to Muscelul Câmpulung, where his former Argeș teammate, Ion Barbu was coach, and he was also colleagues with other former Argeș teammates such as Constantin Radu, Vasile Stan and Marian Popescu. They managed to get the team promoted from the third league to the second where he ended his career in 1978. During his career he was known for his speed, running 100 metres in about 11 seconds.

== International career ==
Jercan played two friendly games for Romania, making his debut on 30 January 1972 under coach Gheorghe Ola in a 4–2 away victory against Morocco. His second game was a 2–2 draw against Peru.

== Coaching career ==
After he ended his playing career, Jercan coached teams in the Romanian lower leagues such as Muscelul Câmpulung, Ș.N. Oltenița, CS Târgoviște, Chimia Găiești, Textila Roșiori and IUPS Chitila.

== Death ==
Jercan spent the final years of his life in his hometown, Popești-Leordeni where on 29 September 2012 he died at age 66.

== Honours ==
Argeș Pitești

- Divizia A: 1971–72

Muscelul Câmpulung

- Divizia C: 1976–77
