= ARO Muscelul Câmpulung =

Romanian football club

- Full name: Asociația Club Sportiv ARO Muscelul Câmpulung
- Nicknames: Muscelenii (The People from Muscel)
- Short name: ARO
- Founded: 1947; 79 years ago as Metalul IMS Câmpulung; 2007; 19 years ago as Sporting Câmpulung; 2012; 14 years ago as CN Dinicu Golescu; 2019; 7 years ago as AF Muscelul Câmpulung
- Ground: Muscelul / Dragoslavele
- Capacity: 6,000 (3,000 seated) / 1,000
- Owner: Câmpulung Municipality
- Chairman: Cristian Vlad
- Head coach: Alin Popescu
- League: Liga III
- 2025–26: Liga III, Series VI; Regular season: 8th of 12; Play-out, Series VI: 2nd of 8
- Website: https://aromuscel.ro/
Home colours	Away colours

Asociația Club Sportiv ARO Muscelul Câmpulung, commonly known as ARO Campulung Muscel, is a Romanian professional football club based in Câmpulung, Argeș County and currently playing in the Liga III, the 3rd tier of the Romanian football league system.

The club experienced glory during the communist era when, under the ownership of ARO, played constantly at the level of second or third league. The collapse of the off-road cars manufacturer has seriously affected the team which went bankrupt in the early 2000s. After the bankruptcy of ARO in 2003, the club was refounded several times, firstly in 2007 as Sporting Câmpulung, then in 2012 as CN Dinicu Golescu (named after the high school from the town), but at its best, the team played in the Liga III, but was dissolved again in 2016. In the summer of 2019, after three years of inactivity, the club was refounded again, this time as Academia de Fotbal Muscelul Câmpulung.

== History ==
The club was originally founded in 1947 as Metalul IMS Câmpulung by Gheorghe Grosaru, a director at the Întreprinderea Metalurgică de Stat (lit. 'State Metallurgical Enterprise'), with factory workers contributing financially to support the team. It competed in the Argeș Regional Championship, finishing 4th in the 1954 season, 6th in the 1955 season, and 6th again in the 1956 season.

Renamed Muscelul IMS Câmpulung, in reference to the historic Muscel County, the traditional geographical area surrounding Câmpulung, the team finished 3rd in the 1958–59 season and 8th in Series I of the 1959–60 season.

In the 1960–61 season, Muscelul IMS won Series I, qualifying for the championship final, where it secured the regional title after a 2–2 away draw and a 4–0 home victory against Unirea Drăgășani. However, it failed to achieve promotion, finishing 5th in the promotion tournament group held in Sibiu.

The club was later renamed Muscelul UMM Câmpulung following the renaming of Uzina Mecanică Muscel (lit. 'Muscel Mechanical Plant'), and after a 4th-place finish in Series I of the 1961–62 season, Muscelul UMM, coached by Ion Lăpușneanu, earned promotion to Divizia C at the end of the 1962–63 season by finishing as runners-up in the Argeș Regional Championship.

In Divizia C, Muscelul finished last in the South Series of the 1963–64 season, but was spared from relegation due to the expansion of the third division. It then spent two consecutive seasons in the West Series of the third tier of Romanian football, finishing 9th in the 1964–65 season and 7th in the 1965–66 season, before competing in the South Series in the 1966–67 season, where it finished 13th and was relegated to the Regional Championship.

Muscelul secured a quick return to Divizia C after finishing as runners-up in the 1967–68 Argeș Regional Championship. The team then spent two seasons in the third tier, competing in Series IV, finishing 11th in the 1968–69 season before being renamed Unirea Câmpulung for the 1969–70 season, during which it struggled and was relegated after finishing 15th.

Following relegation, the club reverted to the Muscelul name and went on to win the 1970–71 Argeș County Championship, earning a swift return to Divizia C. Its stay in the third division was short-lived, as it was immediately relegated back to the County Championship after finishing 13th at the end of the 1971–72 season.

The first time they played in Divizia B was in the 1977–78 season when they barely avoided relegation, in the following one they finished on the 9th place and in 1979–80 they relegated back to Divizia C after finishing on the 15th place.

Muscelul returned to the second division after winning Series VI of Divizia C at the end of the 1984–85 campaign, under the guidance of coach Vasile Stan. The squad included Popa, Istrate, Stoica, N. Iosif, Lungeanu, Miuțu, Nae, Păun, Predică, Necula, Berevoianu, S. Iosif, Oiță, Pescaru, Vlăsceanu, Apostol, Pamfil, Coman, Grigoriu, Moț, and Preda.

In 1985–86, Muscelul competed in Series II of Divizia B under Ion Voica, who took over after eleven rounds, with Stan remaining as assistant, but the team was relegated after finishing in 15th place by the end of the campaign.

In the 1994–95 Divizia C season the team finished on the second place, behind Minerul Motru so in order to promote to Divizia B they had to participate in a play-off against ICIM Brașov but before it, coach Nicolae Tănăsescu was replaced with former Romanian internationals Ion Oblemenco and Nicolae Dobrin, the first as head coach and the latter as technical director. The play-off was played in a single leg and ARO won it with 1–0, the only goal of the game being scored by Sergiu Coman, the team used being: Heroiu – Jitaru, Gorgonaru, Dumitrescu, Durdun – Ioniță, S. Din (I. Bădescu), Eftimie, Cl. Mutu – Butaru (Procorodie), S. Coman. Shortly after the promotion Oblemenco and Dobrin left the club, also the team's goalkeeper, Laurențiu Heroiu was killed after being stabbed in a bar, however the team spent 9 seasons in Divizia B before relegating in 2004, a period in which their biggest performance was with coach Ionel Augustin when they earned the second place in the 1999–2000 season.

In the summer of 2019, after three years of inactivity, the club was refounded again, this time as Academia de Fotbal Muscelul Câmpulung, former Romanian international Gheorghe Mihali was named as manager and Roberto Ayza was one of the first transfers realized by the new entity followed by Iulian Tameș and Iulian Vladu among others. However, the 2019–20 season was suspended in March 2020, due to COVID-19 pandemic in Romania with Muscelul finishing in 3rd place.

Inter Câmpulung logo

In the summer of 2020, it was renamed Inter Câmpulung and finished the 2020–21 short season 3rd in Group B of the Liga IV – Argeș County. In the next season, Muscelenii fought for promotion, finishing in 2d place one point behind CS Rucăr.

In 2022, the club was renamed again, this time as ARO Muscelul Câmpulung.

== Honours ==
- Liga III
  - Winners (2): 1976–77, 1984–85
  - Runners-up (4): 1981–82, 1983–84, 1986–87, 1994–95
- Liga IV – Argeș County
  - Winners (5): 1970–71, 1992–93, 1993–94, 2013–14, 2022–23
  - Runners-up (2): 2021–22, 1972–73
- Argeș Regional Championship
  - Winners (1): 1960–61
  - Runners-up (2): 1962–63, 1967–68

== Players ==
=== First team squad ===
As of 10 September 2024

Note: Flags indicate national team as defined under FIFA eligibility rules; some limited exceptions apply. Players may hold more than one non-FIFA nationality.

No.	Pos.	Nation	Player
1	GK	ROU	Ianis Drăghici
2	DF	ROU	Rareș Grecu
3	DF	ROU	Denis Răduță
4	DF	ROU	Laurențiu Robu
5	DF	ROU	Cosmin Gîtlan (Vice-Captain)
6	MF	ROU	Cristian Balgiu (Captain)
7	DF	ROU	Antonio Burnaz
8	MF	ROU	Denis Pia
9	MF	ROU	Bobi Grancea
10	MF	ROU	Gabriel Jenaru (3rd captain)
11	MF	ROU	Mario Durdun
12	GK	ROU	Vlad Cîrstea
13	MF	ROU	Mario Pănoiu

No.	Pos.	Nation	Player
14	MF	ROU	Dragoș Troană
15	FW	ROU	Darius Șerban
16	MF	ROU	Luis Bunel
17	DF	ROU	Ionuț Mihăescu
18	MF	ROU	Ianis Răuță
19	MF	ROU	Vlad Tudor
20	MF	ROU	Mihai Moșoiu
21	MF	ROU	Claudiu Pleșa
23	FW	ROU	Albert Jarcă (on loan from FCSB)
24	DF	ROU	Ionuț Giuroiu
26	MF	BRA	Mário Maeda
27	MF	ROU	Andrei Chivulescu

=== Out on loan ===
Note: Flags indicate national team as defined under FIFA eligibility rules; some limited exceptions apply. Players may hold more than one non-FIFA nationality.

No. / Pos. / Nation / Player	No. / Pos. / Nation / Player

== Club officials ==
=== Board of directors ===
Role	Name
Owner	(Romania) Câmpulung Municipality
President	(Romania) Zaharia Nițu
Executive President	(Romania) Cristian Vlad
Sporting Director	(Romania) Corneliu Sorescu
Secretary	(Romania) Gabriel Bălan
Press officer	(Romania) Bogdan Burhan

=== Current technical staff ===
Role	Name
Manager	(Romania) Alin Popescu
Assistant coach	(Romania) Marius Tomozei
Goalkeeping coach	(Romania) Constantin Bădan
Club doctor	(Romania) Marius Pitulan
Kinetotherapist	(Romania) Claudiu Crețu
Storeman	(Romania) Gheorghe Geană

== League and cup history ==
Season	Tier	Division	Place	Notes	Cupa României
2026–27	3	Liga III	TBD		First Round
2025–26	3	Liga III (Series VI)	6th		
2024–25	3	Liga III (Series VIII)	8th		
2023–24	3	Liga III (Series IV)	8th		
2022–23	4	Liga IV (AG)	1st (C, P)	Promoted	
2021–22	4	Liga IV (AG)	2nd		
2020–21	4	Liga IV (AG) (Group B)	3rd		
2019–20	4	Liga IV (AG)	3rd		
2016–19	Not active				
2015–16	3	Liga III (Series III)	5th	Disbanded	Third round
2014–15	3	Liga III (Series III)	13th		
2013–14	4	Liga IV (AG)	1st (C, P)	Promoted	
2012–13	4	Liga IV (AG)	7th		
2009–12	Not active				
2008–09	3	Liga III (Series IV)	4th	Disbanded	
2007–08	4	Liga IV (AG)	4th		

Season	Tier	Division	Place	Notes	Cupa României
2004–07	Not active				
2003–04	2	Divizia B (Series II)	16th (R)	Relegated	
2002–03	2	Divizia B (Series II)	10th		
2001–02	2	Divizia B (Series I)	9th		Round of 32
2000–01	2	Divizia B (Series I)	11th		
1999–00	2	Divizia B (Series II)	2nd		
1998–99	2	Divizia B (Series II)	3rd		
1997–98	2	Divizia B (Series II)	8th		
1996–97	2	Divizia B (Series II)	12th		
1995–96	2	Divizia B (Series I)	11th		
1994–95	3	Divizia C (Series III)	2nd (P)	Promoted	
1993–94	4	Divizia D (AG)	1st (C, P)	Promoted	Round of 16
1992–93	4	Divizia D (AG)	1st (C)		
1991–92	3	Divizia C (Series VII)	6th (R)	Relegated	
1990–91	3	Divizia C (Series VII)	7th		
1989–90	3	Divizia C (Series VII)	8th		

== Former managers ==
- (Romania) Ștefan Stănculescu (1956–1957)
- (Romania) Ion Barbu (1974–1976)
- (Romania) Vasile Copil (1977–1978)
- (Romania) Constantin Ștefan (1978–1979)
- (Romania) Vasile Stan (1984–1985)
- (Romania) Ion Voica (1985–1986)
- (Romania) Ion Oblemenco (1995)
- (Romania) Ionel Augustin (1998–2002)
- (Romania) Ionel Augustin (2003–2004)
- (Romania) Constantin Stancu (2008–2009)
- (Romania) Gheorghe Mihali (2019)
- (Romania) Emil Dică (2020)
- (Romania) Gheorghe Ene
- (Romania) Ion Lăpușneanu
- (Romania) Nicolae Tănăsescu
- (Romania) Radu Jercan
- (Romania) Vasile Stan
- (Romania) Ion Barbu
