= Nicolae Dobrin =

Romanian footballer (1947–2007)

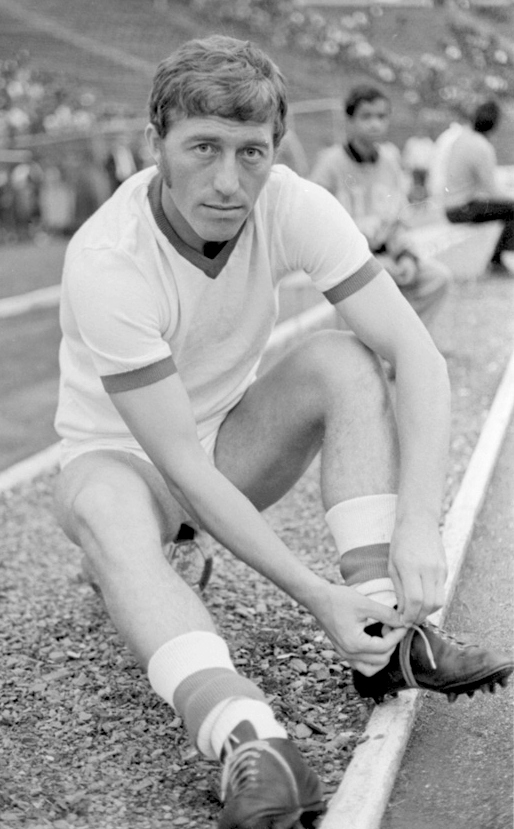
- Dobrin with Argeș Pitești in the 1970s

Personal information
- Date of birth: 26 August 1947
- Place of birth: Pitești, Romania
- Date of death: 26 October 2007 (aged 60)
- Place of death: Pitești, Romania
- Height: 1.80 m (5 ft 11 in)
- Position: Attacking midfielder

Youth career
- 1959–1962: Dinamo Pitești

Senior career*
| Years | Team | Apps | (Gls) |
| 1962–1980 | Argeș Pitești | 391 | (106) |
| 1980–1982 | CS Târgoviște | 42 | (22) |
| 1982–1983 | Argeș Pitești | 5 | (0) |
| 1985–1986 | CS Botoșani | | |
| Total | | 438 | (128) |

International career
| 1966–1980 | Romania | 47 | (6) |

Managerial career
- 1982–1985: Argeș Pitești
- 1985–1986: CS Botoșani
- 1992: Argeș Pitești
- 1995: Argeș Pitești
- 1998–1999: Argeș Pitești
Medal record
Argeș Pitești
| Winner | Romanian League | 1971 |
| Winner | Romanian League | 1979 |
| Runner-up | Romanian Cup | 1965 |
| Runner-up | Romanian League | 1968 |
| Runner-up | Romanian League | 1978 |
- * Club domestic league appearances and goals

Nicolae Dobrin (Romanian pronunciation: [nikoˈla.e doˈbrin]; 26 August 1947 – 26 October 2007) was a Romanian professional footballer who played as an attacking midfielder and a manager.

Nicknamed Gâscanul ("The Gander") or Prințul din Trivale ("The Prince of Trivale"), he is considered one of Romania's greatest footballers. Renowned for his dribbling ability, Dobrin received the Romanian Footballer of the Year award on three occasions, in 1966, 1967, and 1971, and a stadium in his native Pitești is named after him.

== Club career ==
"The player I loved and for whom I will hold a special esteem is Gicu Dobrin. Thanks to him I became a respected coach, thanks to him I and FC Argeș were champions. He was a phenomenal player"

— Florin Halagian, former Argeș Pitești manager

Dobrin, nicknamed Gâscanul ("The Gander") or Prințul din Trivale ("The Prince of Trivale"), was born on 26 August 1947 in Pitești, Argeș County, Romania, and is considered one of Romania's greatest footballers. He began playing football as a child with his friends on a field they nicknamed "Maracana", located close to the Argeș river. One day in 1959 some players from Dinamo Pitești came to play with them, and Dobrin's team won 12–2, with him scoring six goals. After the game, Leonte Ianovschi, a coach at the youth center of Dinamo Pitești, told him to come to the club's training sessions. Dobrin played for the first time in a Divizia A match when he was still 14 years old, on 1 July 1962, coach Ștefan Vasile using him in a match between Știința Cluj and Dinamo Pitești that ended with a 5–1 loss, thus holding the record of the youngest debutant in the competition.

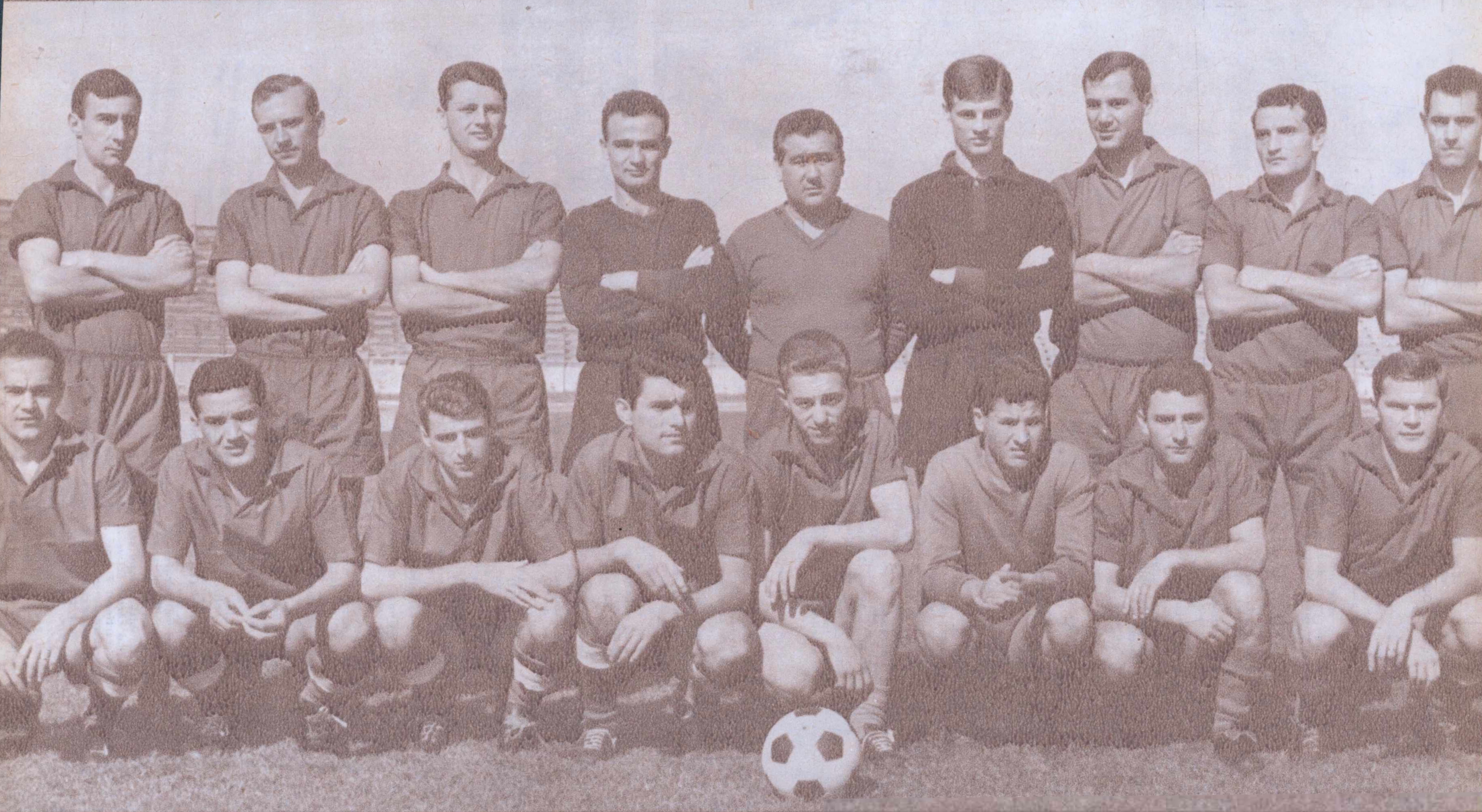
Dobrin, aged 18 (pictured front row, fourth from right) with Dinamo Pitești in 1965.

Dobrin played for his local club Argeș Pitești for most of his professional career. His first performance occurred when the team reached the 1965 Cupa României final, where coach Virgil Mărdărescu used him as a starter in the eventual 2–1 loss to Știința Cluj. In the last round of the 1968–69 season, he scored a double and provided an assist for Petre Nuțu's goal in a 3–0 win over ASA Târgu Mureș which earned the points that saved them from relegation. In the last game of the following season, The Violet Eagles were playing against Universitatea Craiova, with Dobrin and Universitatea star Ion Oblemenco competing for the top-scorer of the season award, Oblemenco leading with one goal more than Dobrin. Dobrin opened the score in the 37th minute, but Oblemenco equalized one minute later and the game ended in a 1–1 draw, thus Dobrin finishing as the second league top-scorer with 18 goals. Afterwards, under the guidance of coach Florin Halagian he won two Divizia A titles. For the 1971–72 title, he formed a successful trio in the offence with Constantin Radu and Radu Jercan, being the team's top-scorer with 15 goals netted in 23 matches. During the winning of the 1978–79 title, he formed another successful attacking trio, this time with Marin Radu and Doru Nicolae, Dobrin contributing with nine goals scored in 22 matches. Dobrin was decisive in the final game of the season against Dinamo București in which he netted the final goal of the 4–3 victory, his performance being appreciated by journalist Ioan Chirilă who gave him a grade 10 in the Sportul newspaper.

Dobrin played 25 games and scored eight goals in European competitions (including 12 games and two goals in the Inter-Cities Fairs Cup). He appeared in six games in the 1966–67 Inter-Cities Fairs Cup, as in the first two rounds Dinamo Pitești eliminated Sevilla and Toulouse, Dobrin scoring once against the latter, being defeated in the third round with 1–0 on aggregate by Dinamo Zagreb who eventually won the competition. In the winter of 1966, because the French people were impressed that they defeated Toulouse, Dinamo Pitești was invited to participate at the friendly tournament organized in Marseille called Tele-magazine International Cup. There, two emissaries of Inter Milan made an offer of $250,000 to Dinamo Pitești to transfer the 19-year old Dobrin at Helenio Herrera's team, but Dinamo's officials did not want to negotiate, being fearful of possible consequences they would face from Romania's communist regime.

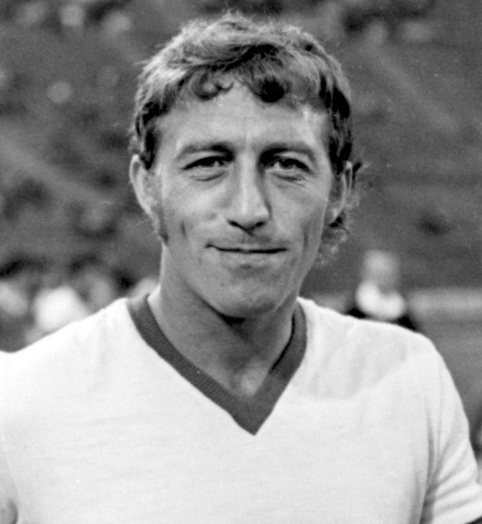
Dobrin with FC Argeș

In the first round of the 1972–73 European Cup, he helped Argeș Pitești get past Aris Bonnevoie by scoring three goals. In the following round, they won a home game 2–1 against Real Madrid—with Dobrin opening the scoring—but they lost the second leg 3–1. However, this was enough for Real Madrid's president Santiago Bernabéu to want him at the club, making a potential record breaking offer of $2 million and a nocturne installation for the 1 Mai stadium in Pitești. Because of the communist regime in Romania in that period, Bernabéu had to hold talks with dictator Nicolae Ceaușescu himself, but could not persuade him, because Dobrin was regarded as a "national treasure" and such values could not be "estranged", especially not playing in a team from the country of Francisco Franco's fascist dictatorship. It is said that this was the biggest regret of Dobrin's life, although he did eventually end up playing in Francisco Gento's testimonial, in the famous "blanco" shirt of Real Madrid. On this occasion Santiago Bernabéu made a last unsuccessful attempt to keep the Romanian player in Madrid.

In the 1978–79 UEFA Cup, Argeș defeated Valencia in the home game with 2–1, Dobrin opening the scoring from an indirect free kick. According to his former teammate Andrei Speriatu, after the game, Mario Kempes, who had just won the World Cup with Argentina as the top-scorer and best player of the tournament, went to Dobrin and told him:"You are a great player!". However, Argeș lost the second leg with 5–2. His last four appearances in European competitions were in the 1979–80 European Cup as they eliminated AEK Athens in the first round, being eliminated in the following one by title holders and eventual winners, Nottingham Forest.

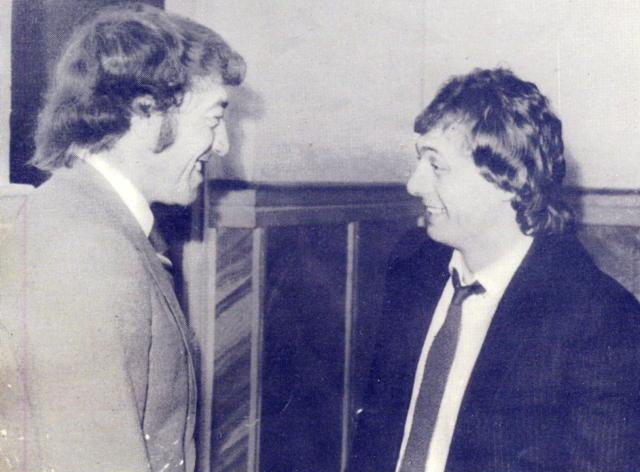
Dobrin (left) pictured with Ilie Balaci

In 1980, Dobrin joined CS Târgoviște in Divizia B, scoring 17 goals in his first season which helped them gain promotion to Divizia A, where in the following season he played 13 games and scored five goals. In 1982, he returned to Argeș Pitești as a player-coach, making his last appearance as a player on 14 June 1983 in a 2–0 victory against Bihor Oradea. In the 1985–86 Divizia B season, Dobrin came out of retirement, being a player-coach at CS Botoșani. Throughout his career, Dobrin played 409 Divizia A matches with 111 goals scored and was the Romanian Footballer of the Year in 1966, 1967 and 1971.

In 1995, Dobrin was awarded the Honorary Citizen of Pitești title for "the total dedication with which he served Romanian football and the team Argeș, into which he poured all his energy and unparalleled talent". In 2003, the Local Council of Pitești decided to rename the club's stadium the Stadionul Nicolae Dobrin in his honor. In 2008, a statue of him was placed within the stadium. Two streets, in Pitești and Târgoviște respectively, were named after him.

== International career ==
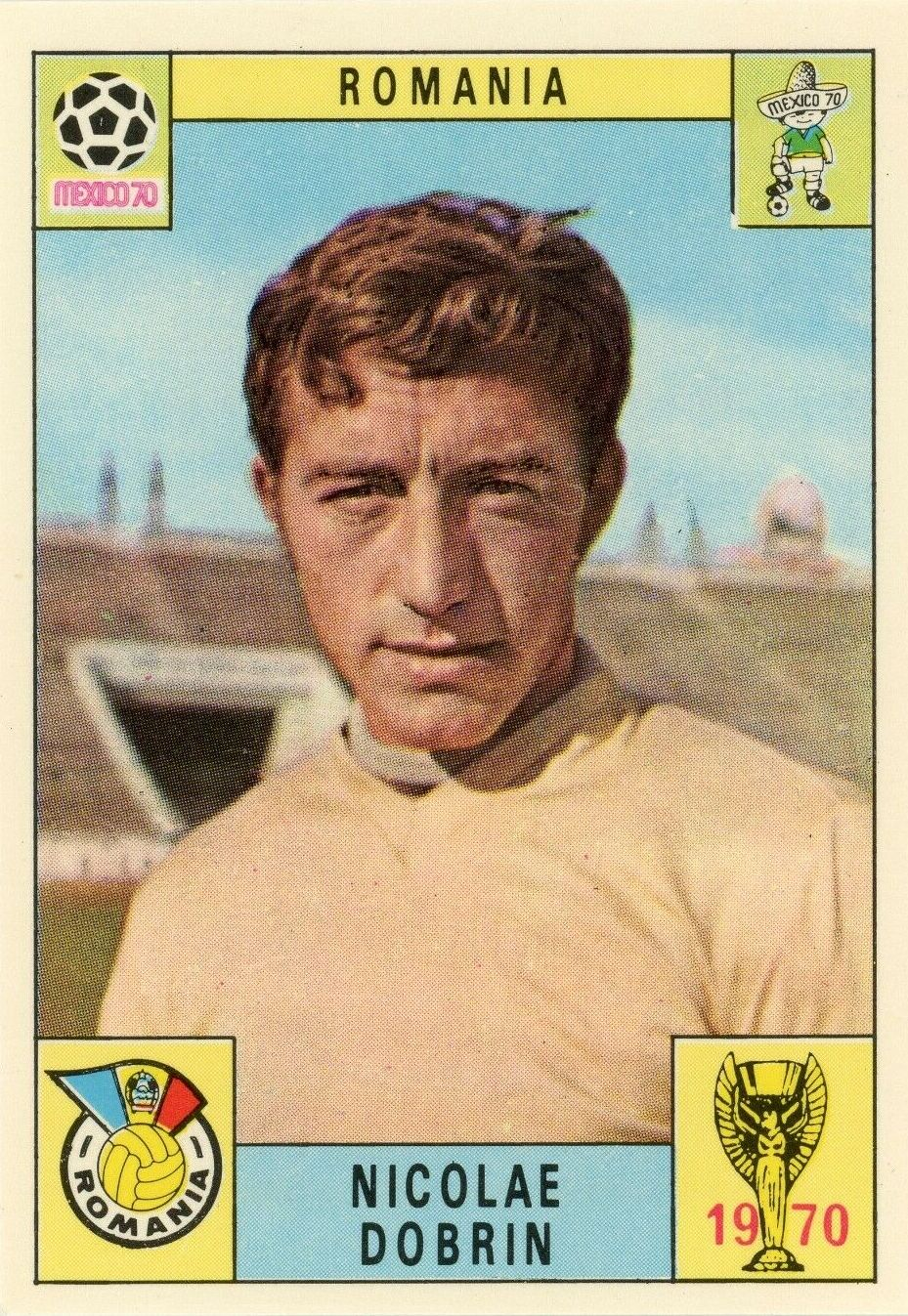
Dobrin with Romania

Dobrin played 47 games and scored six goals for Romania, making his debut on 1 June 1966 under coach Ilie Oană in a 1–0 friendly loss to West Germany played at Südweststadion in Ludwigshafen. He made a good impression in the game, showing his dribbling abilities in front of West Germany's experienced midfielder Horst Szymaniak and after the game, World Cup winner Fritz Walter went into Romania's locker room to tell Dobrin: "Boy, if you're good and drink a lot of milk, you're going to be a great player!". The press from West Germany also praised Dobrin, as the newspaper 5 Uhr Blatt wrote the next day: "Game coordinator Dobrin has impressed with his demonstrated high class" and Die Rheinpfalz wrote: "Of special class is Dobrin, who for his age proves an impressive maturity and a brilliant technique".

Dobrin played four games and scored two goals against Italy and Switzerland in the Euro 1968 qualifiers. Afterwards, he appeared in three games in which he scored one goal in a 1–0 victory against Portugal during the successful 1970 World Cup qualifiers. He was selected by coach Angelo Niculescu to be part of Romania's 1970 World Cup squad, but did not play in any match. The reasons for Niculescu's decision not to play him remain unclear, but his absence is considered one of the most controversial moments in Romanian football history. Dobrin played six matches and scored two goals in the 1972 Euro qualifiers, managing to reach the quarter-finals where Romania was defeated by Hungary who advanced to the final tournament. He went on to play three games in which he scored one goal in the 1974 World Cup qualifiers and made three appearances during the Euro 1976 qualifiers. Subsequently, he made one appearance in the Euro 1980 qualifiers and two during the 1977–80 Balkan Cup. Dobrin made his last appearance for the national team on 2 April 1980 in a friendly which ended in a 2–2 draw against East Germany.

In 2022, the International Federation of Football History & Statistics (IFFHS) included Dobrin in its "Romania's all-time dream team" first XI.

=== International goals ===
Scores and results list Romania's goal tally first, score column indicates score after each Dobrin goal.

List of international goals scored by Nicolae Dobrin
| # | Date | Venue | Cap | Opponent | Score | Result | Competition |
|---|---|---|---|---|---|---|---|
| 1 | 26 November 1966 | Stadio San Paolo, Naples, Italy | 5 | Italy | 1–0 | 1–3 | Euro 1968 qualifiers |
| 2 | 24 May 1967 | Hardturm, Zürich, Switzerland | 11 | Switzerland | 1–7 | 1–7 | Euro 1968 qualifiers |
| 3 | 12 October 1969 | Stadionul 23 August, Bucharest, Romania | 18 | Portugal | 1–0 | 1–0 | 1970 World Cup qualifiers |
| 4 | 14 November 1971 | Stadionul 23 August, Bucharest, Romania | 27 | Czechoslovakia | 2–1 | 2–1 | 1972 Euro qualifiers |
| 5 | 14 May 1972 | Stadionul 23 August, Bucharest, Romania | 29 | Hungary | 1–1 | 2–2 | 1972 Euro quarter-finals |
| 6 | 29 October 1972 | Stadionul 23 August, Bucharest, Romania | 33 | Albania | 1–0 | 2–0 | 1974 World Cup qualifiers |

== Managerial career ==
Dobrin started his managerial career in the 1982–83 Divizia A season as a player-coach at Argeș Pitești. He coached Argeș Pitești on several occasions, managing the club in a total of 138 Divizia A matches. His only coaching experience outside of Argeș Pitești was in the 1985–86 Divizia B season, when he served as a player-coach at CS Botoșani. Dobrin also worked as a technical director for a short while at ARO Muscelul Câmpulung alongside head coach Ion Oblemenco at the end of the 1994–95 Divizia C season. They helped the team get promoted to the second league after winning a promotion play-off against ICIM Brașov.

== Style of play ==
Dobrin's style of play was praised by journalist Ion Cupen, who wrote: “Dobrin amazed with flawless technique, refinement, tactical sense, a cunning shot, selflessness, and fair play. He dribbled bewilderingly, eyes lifted, as if sensing a wider horizon visible only to him. He guided his teammates along paths known only to him, always unguarded by the opposition. Charm, colour, effectiveness. And a constant disregard for prejudice, bending the rigid rules of sporting life with a smile upon his lips.”

Writer Fănuș Neagu described Dobrin’s playing style in metaphorical terms: “The moment we see him near the ball, hungry for the game, roses bloom in our hands, for he is the bullfighter favored by fate and luck, and we are his love, paid for with the bull's blood.”

== Publications ==
Several books about Dobrin were written by various authors:

- Fotbalul, inainte si dupa Dobrin (Football, before and after Dobrin) - written by Sebastian Tudor (1992)
- Dobrin, la clipa amintirilor... (Dobrin, at the moment of memories...) - written by Ilie Dobre (1992)
- "Prințul" din Trivale, la ultimul "dribling" (The "Prince" of Trivale, on his last "dribble") - written by Ilie Dobre (2008)
- Ultimul crai (The last monarch) - written by Ioan Chirilă (2008)

== Death ==
Dobrin started smoking when he was around 8 or 9 years old, a habit that eventually led to lung cancer. He died on 26 October 2007, at the age of 60, following multiple organ failure at the County Hospital in Pitești. His funeral, held on 29 October at St. George's Cathedral and St. George's Military Cemetery, was attended by more than 5,000 people.

== Honours ==
Argeș Pitești

- Divizia A: 1971–72, 1978–79
- Cupa României runner-up: 1964–65

CS Târgoviște

- Divizia B: 1980–81

Individual

- Romanian Footballer of the Year: 1966, 1967, 1971
