= Florin Halagian =

Romanian footballer and manager (1939–2019)

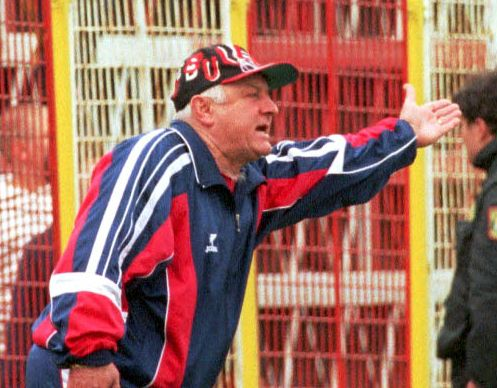
- Halagian as a manager, wearing his lucky Chicago Bulls hat.

Personal information
- Full name: Florin Vașken Halagian
- Date of birth: 7 March 1939
- Place of birth: Bucharest, Romania
- Date of death: 12 August 2019 (aged 80)
- Place of death: Bucharest, Romania
- Height: 1.73 m (5 ft 8 in)
- Position: Midfielder

Youth career
- 1950–1957: Dinamo București

Senior career*
Years	Team	Apps	(Gls)
1957–1958	Progresul CPCS București		
1958–1959	Pompierul București		
1959–1962	Dinamo Pitești (Note: Only the statistics for the 1961–62 Divizia A season are available.)	23	(5)
1963–1964	Dinamo București	0	(0)
1964	Petrolul Ploiești	7	(1)
1964–1965	Minerul Baia Mare	22	(2)
1965	Dinamo Pitești	1	(0)
1966–1968	Politehnica București		
1969	Vagonul Arad	5	(0)
Total		58	(8)

International career
1962	Romania U23	2	(1)

Managerial career
- 1970–1971: Argeș Pitești (juniors)
- 1971–1973: Argeș Pitești
- 1973–1974: Minerul Baia Mare
- 1974–1981: Argeș Pitești
- 1979: Romania Olympic
- 1979: Romania
- 1981–1984: Olt Scornicești
- 1984: Steaua București
- 1985: Universitatea Craiova
- 1985–1988: Argeș Pitești
- 1987: Romania U21
- 1987–1988: Romania Olympic
- 1988–1989: Victoria București
- 1990: Romania U21
- 1991–1992: Dinamo București
- 1993–1994: Dinamo București
- 1994–1995: Inter Sibiu
- 1995: Romania U21
- 1995–1997: Național București
- 1997–1999: FCM Bacău
- 1999–2000: Argeș Pitești
- 2000: FC Brașov
- 2000: Ceahlăul Piatra Neamț
- 2001–2002: Argeș Pitești
- 2009–2010: Gloria Bistrița
- 2010: Dacia Mioveni
- 2011: Gloria Bistrița
- * Club domestic league appearances and goals

Florin Vașken Halagian (7 March 1939 – 12 August 2019) was a Romanian football player and manager of Armenian descent, hence the nickname Armeanul (The Armenian). With 878 games, he is the manager who has the most matches in the Romanian top-division.

== Club career ==
Halagian was born on 7 March 1939 in Bucharest, Romania and began playing junior-level football in 1950 at local club Dinamo where he was taught by coaches such as Colea Vâlcov, Petre Steinbach and Ion Nedelescu. In 1957 he started his senior career at Divizia B club, Progresul CPCS București for which he scored four goals. After one year he left the club to go to Pompierul București.

In 1959, he switched teams again, joining Dinamo Pitești with whom he was promoted to Divizia A in 1961. He made his debut and scored his first goal in the competition on 20 August under coach Ștefan Vasile in a 4–3 loss to eventual champions, Dinamo București. Halagian made 23 appearances in his first top-league season, but the team was relegated at the end of it, and he was also teammate with a young Nicolae Dobrin. The team from Pitești managed to get promoted back to the first league after only one season, but he left them in the middle of that season to go and play for Dinamo București. He made no league appearances for The Red Dogs, playing only half an hour in the Cupa României.

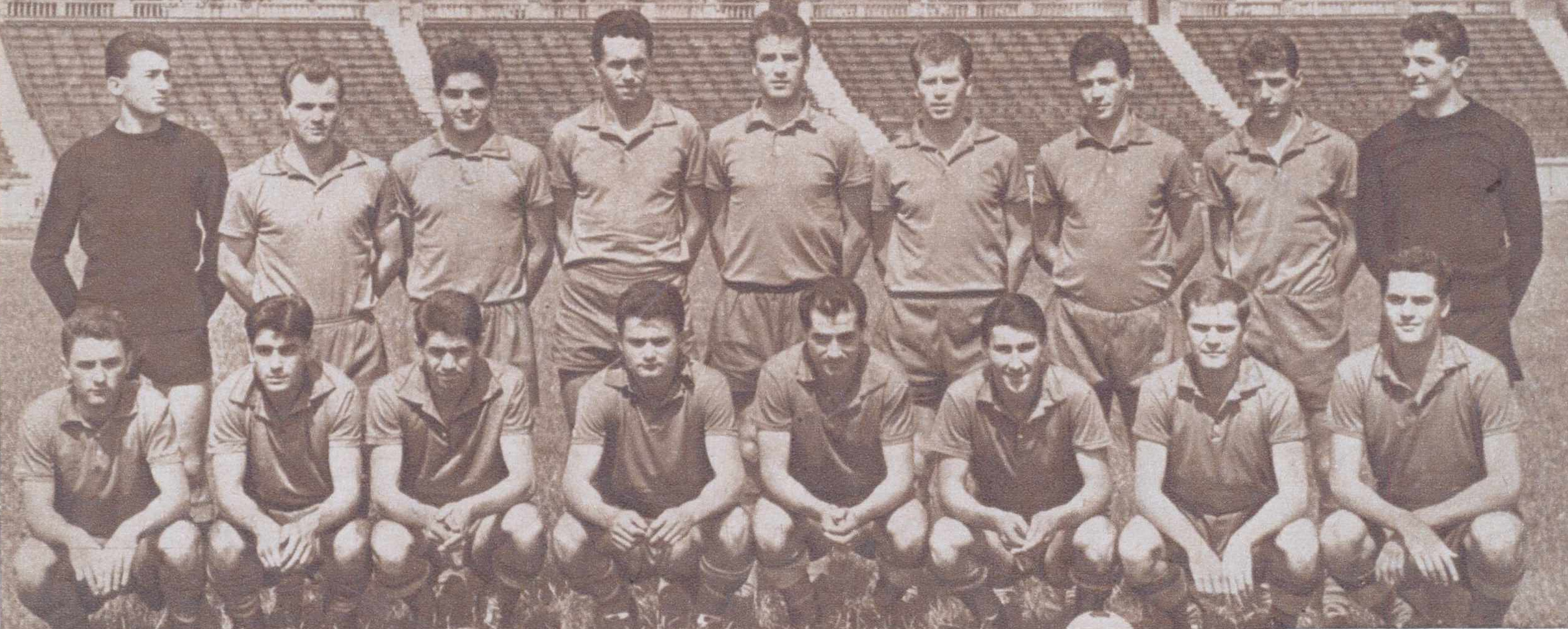
Halagain (bottom row, first from left) with Dinamo București in the 1963–64 season.

In 1964, he signed with Petrolul Ploiești where he scored once in seven matches. For the 1964–65 season he went to play for Minerul Baia Mare, scoring twice in 22 games, and the team was relegated at the end of it. In 1965, Halagian came back to Dinamo Pitești, but left the club shortly, as he played a single game, to join Divizia B club, Politehnica București. In 1969 he arrived at Vagonul Arad where on 30 March he made his last Divizia A appearance in a 2–1 home loss to Universitatea Cluj, totaling 58 matches with eight goals in the competition. Vagonul was also relegated at the end of the season.

== International career ==
Halagian played two games in 1962 for Romania's under-23 team, making his debut in a 5–4 win over Ethiopia against whom he scored once. His second game was a 1–0 loss to Germany.

== Managerial career ==
In 1970, Halagian started coaching juniors at Argeș Pitești. After a 4–1 away loss to FCM Bacău in the first round of the 1971–72 season, coach Titus Ozon left the club, Halagian being named the team's new head coach. His first game managed took place on 21 August 1971, ending with a 2–1 home win over Rapid București, courtesy of a brace scored by Radu Jercan. Over the course of the season, Argeș won both games against defending champions, Dinamo București, finishing in first place, thus Halagian, aged 33 became one of the youngest coaches who ever won the title. Afterwards, the club participated in the 1972–73 European Cup, eliminating Aris Bonnevoie in the first round, then in the following one they won a home game with 2–1 against Real Madrid led by coach Miguel Muñoz, but lost the second leg with 3–1. In the same season, the team finished the championship in third place, Halagian leaving afterwards.

After the first eight rounds of the 1973–74 season, Minerul Baia Mare was in 13th place, Halagian then took over the team, leading them to a fifth-place finish.

He then returned to Argeș where after three mediocre seasons he finished the 1977–78 season in second place at equal points with Steaua București who had a better goal difference. Thus the team qualified to the 1978–79 UEFA Cup where in the first round they got past Panathinaikos with a 5–1 aggregate victory. In the second round they won with 2–1 the first leg against Valencia which was led on the field by recently World Cup winner Mario Kempes who was also the top-scorer and best player of the tournament. However, they lost the second leg with 5–2, thus the campaign ended. In the same season he helped the club win the second title in its history which was mathematically won after a spectacular 4–3 away victory in the last round over Dinamo București. Next season, Argeș participated in the 1979–80 European Cup where after defeating AEK Athens in the first round, they were eliminated by Brian Clough's Nottingham Forest who were the title holders and eventual winners of the competition. Halagian had a special relationship and respect with player Nicolae Dobrin about whom he said:"The player I loved and for whom I hold a special esteem is Gicu Dobrin. Thanks to him I became a respected coach, thanks to him I and FC Argeș were champions. He was a phenomenal player."

During this period he also worked in parallel for the Romanian Football Federation which put him in charge of Romania's Olympic team, being eliminated with 3–2 on aggregate by Hungary in the first round of the 1980 Summer Olympics qualifiers. Afterwards he led Romania's main squad in a single match which ended in a 1–1 draw against Cyprus in the Euro 1980 qualifiers.

After finishing twice in the league in third place, Halagian left Argeș to coach Olt Scornicești. There, with the help of some of his former players from Argeș like Ilie Bărbulescu, Marin Radu and Sevastian Iovănescu, he finished the 1981–82 season in fourth place on equal points with the third-place team, Mircea Lucescu's Corvinul Hunedoara which qualified to the UEFA Cup. In 1984, he arrived at Steaua București, where he reunited with several players he had coached at Olt Scornicești, such as Ilie Bărbulescu, Marin Radu, Victor Pițurcă and Adrian Bumbescu. However, after the first seven rounds of the season in which the team was undefeated, and an elimination from the European Cup Winners' Cup (a 1–0 aggregate loss to AS Roma, led by coach Sven-Göran Eriksson), Halagian was replaced by Emerich Jenei, and the team went on to win the title at the end of the season. Steaua also managed to win the 1985–86 European Cup and Halagian is considered to have a merit in this performance as he brought to the team some of the players that helped it achieve this performance.

In the spring of 1985, Halagian took over Universitatea Craiova with whom he finished the season in fourth place and reached the 1985 Cupa României final which was lost with 2–1 against his former team, Steaua. Shortly afterwards he made a comeback at Argeș Pitești where he reached, but lost the 1984–85 Balkans Cup final against Iraklis. Also from 1987 until 1988 he worked again in parallel for the Romanian Football Federation which first appointed him head coach at Romania's under-21 national team. Then he led the Olympic side in two losses to Poland and Denmark in the unsuccessful 1988 Summer Olympics qualifiers.

Halagian left Pitești after three years to coach Victoria București with whom he finished the 1988–89 season in third place. The team also eliminated Sliema Wanderers, Dinamo Minsk and Turun Palloseura in the 1988–89 UEFA Cup edition, the campaign ending in the quarter-finals where they were defeated by Dynamo Dresden. In the first round in the following season of the same competition, Victoria met Halagian's old acquaintance, Valencia, earning a 1–1 draw in the first leg, but lost the second one with 3–1. After the 1989 Romanian Revolution, Victoria was dissolved by the Romanian Football Federation as it was considered that they were unfairly advantaged by the communist regime in the past years, so he went to work again for Romania's under-21 side for a while.

In 1991, Halagian went to Dinamo București, having Rinus Israel alongside him as technical director, and managed to win the league title undefeated in his first season. They also eliminated in the first round of the UEFA Cup with 2–1 on aggregate Sporting Lisbon which was led on the field by Luis Figo, losing in the following one with 5–3 on aggregate to Genoa. Halagian left Dinamo in October 1992, being replaced with Alexandru Moldovan, but came back to the club in May 1993, finishing the season in second place and the next one in third.

Afterwards he went for one season at Inter Sibiu where he finished in ninth place, followed by a brief three-match spell at Romania's under-21 team. Then he went to Național București where he finished two consecutive seasons in second place and reached the 1997 Cupa României final which was lost with 4–2 to Steaua. Halagian also led The Bankers in the 1996–97 UEFA Cup edition, eliminating Partizan Belgrade and Chornomorets Odesa in the early rounds, the campaign ending after a 3–1 aggregate loss to Club Brugge. He then had a spell of two years at FCM Bacău after which he had several short spells at Argeș Pitești, FC Brașov, Ceahlăul Piatra Neamț and Argeș again, retiring in 2002 at age 64.

He came back to coaching in September 2009 when he signed with Gloria Bistrița, leading the club for 11 rounds until the end of the first half of the 2009–10 season. In 2010 he worked for a while at Dacia Mioveni in the second league. In April 2011, Halagian had the last coaching spell of his career, returning to Gloria Bistrița, but was sacked three weeks later because of issues regarding players shaving before matches.

He is the manager who has the most matches in the Romanian first league with 878 games consisting of 432 victories, 176 draws and 270 losses, having 33 seasons of activity in the competition, and also totaling 44 matches in European competitions.

On 25 March 2008 he was decorated by the president of Romania, Traian Băsescu for all of his achievements as a football coach, and for forming a young generation of future champions with Ordinul "Meritul Sportiv" — (The Order "The Sportive Merit") class III.

=== Managing style ===
It was said about him that he was a strict and severe manager, having expectations for the footballers such as shaving before the matches but his reply in an interview was:"I don't think I was a rough coach because I loved all my players, no matter how good they were. I had discussions throughout my career with my players because I cared a lot about their dress and behavior outside the field of play. I would explain to them why the way they present themselves in front of people is extremely important, not only for them, but even for the club and the city. It really bothered me if their extra-sports life was unbalanced. I cared for many as if they were my children."

One of Halagian's famous quotes as coach was: Focu' la ei! (The fire at them!), explaining:"This is an expression that I invented to convey to the players on the pitch that the ball is good to be on the opponent half of the pitch, even if we have possession or not, I told them it is better to play there."

He also had superstitions, stating he wore a Chicago Bulls hat for many years during games because he believed it would bring him luck:"Even now I have a bunch of caps in my hanger. It was a weakness of mine. My wife put the Chicago Bulls one for safe keeping because she said memories should be kept. I think I would still wear it now if I had it handy and it would probably deteriorate. People cling to all sorts of things that they think might help them. I am Armenian, but I borrowed Romanian customs, because I was born here. At that time I was really convinced that the hat brought me good luck."

== Personal life and death ==
Sports commentator Ilie Dobre wrote a book about him titled Florin Halagian - un senior la curtea Regelui Fotbal (Florin Halagian - a senior at the court of King Football), which was released in 1995.

Halagian died on 12 August 2019 at age 80.

== Quotes ==
- "The fire at them!"
- "I never leave, I'm waiting to be kicked out."
- "It doesn't matter if it's good or bad, the only important thing is that it's written about you."

== Honours ==
=== Player ===
Dinamo Pitești

- Divizia B: 1960–61, 1962–63

=== Manager ===
Argeș Pitești

- Divizia A: 1971–72, 1978–79, runner-up 1977–78
- Balkans Cup runner-up: 1984–85

Steaua București

- Divizia A: 1984–85

Universitatea Craiova

- Cupa României runner-up: 1984–85

Dinamo București

- Divizia A: 1991–92, runner-up 1992–93

Național București

- Divizia A runner-up: 1995–96, 1996–97
- Cupa României runner-up: 1996–97
