= AKM =

Soviet assault rifle

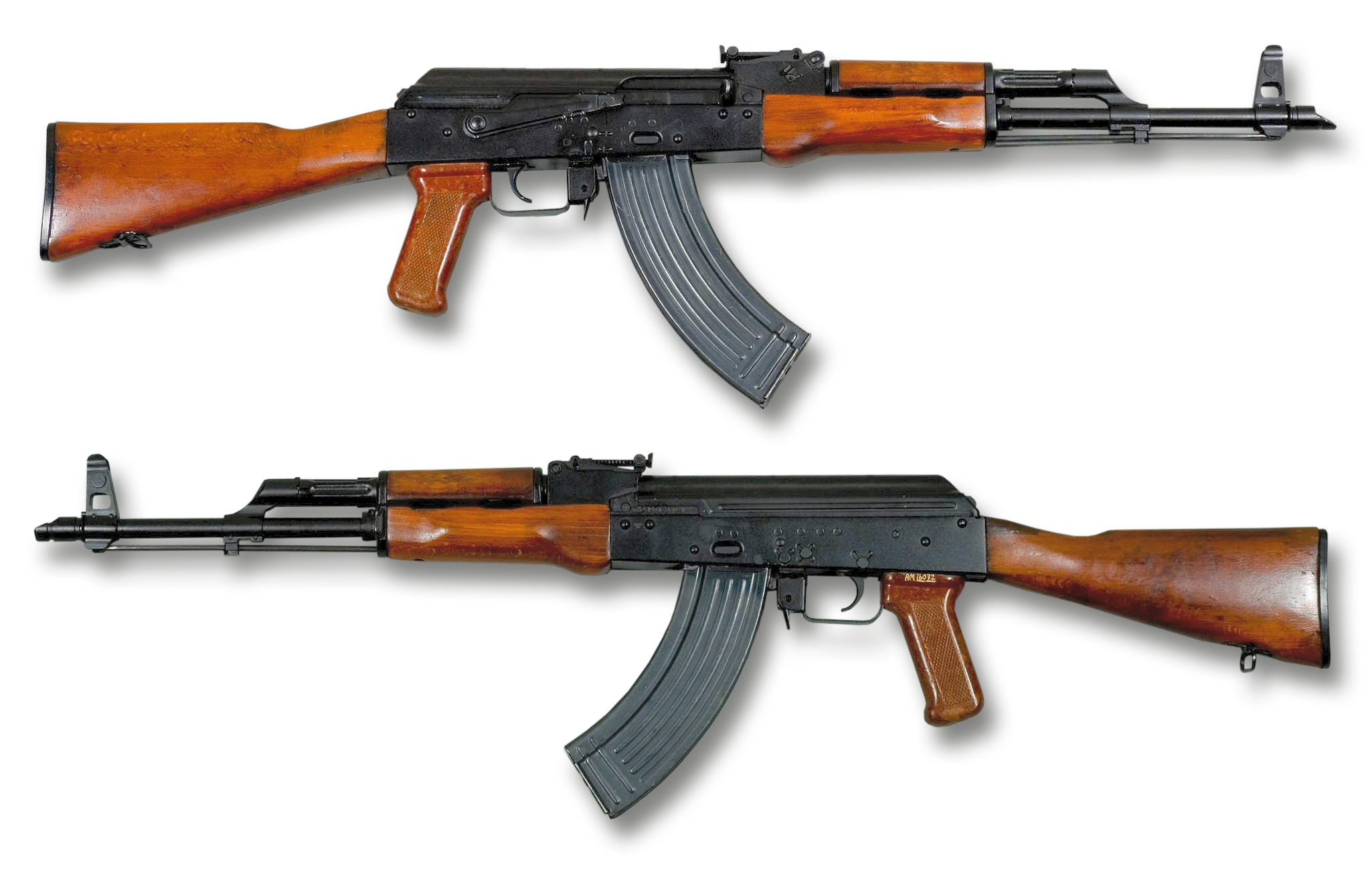
- Both sides of the AKM
- Type: Assault rifle
- Place of origin: Soviet Union

Service history
- In service: 1959–present
- Used by: See Users
- Wars: See Conflicts

Production history
- Designer: Mikhail Kalashnikov
- Designed: 1950s
- Manufacturer: Izhmash; Tula Arms Plant
- Produced: 1959–1977 (Soviet Union); 1959–present (licensed manufacturers)
- No. built: 10,278,300
- Variants: See Variants

Specifications
- Mass: AKM: 3.3 kg (7.28 lb); AKMS: 3.5 kg (7.7 lb); 30-round magazine: 0.33 kg (0.73 lb); 6H4 bayonet: 0.32 kg (0.71 lb)
- Length: AKM, AKML: 880 mm (34.6 in); AKMS, AKMSN: 920 mm (36.2 in) stock extended / 655 mm (25.8 in) stock folded
- Barrel length: 415 mm (16.3 in)
- Cartridge: 7.62×39mm
- Action: Gas-operated, long-stroke piston, closed rotating bolt
- Rate of fire: Cyclic rate of fire: 600 rounds/min; Practical rate of fire: Semi-automatic: 40 rounds/min; Fully automatic: 100 rounds/min
- Muzzle velocity: 715 m/s (2,346 ft/s)
- Effective firing range: 300 m (328 yd)
- Feed system: 10-, 20-, or 30-round detachable box magazines. Also compatible with 40-round box magazines and 75-round drum magazines from the RPK
- Sights: Rear sight notch on sliding tangent, front post; 100–1,000 m sight adjustments; Sight radius: 378 mm (14.9 in)

The AKM (Russian: Автома́т Кала́шникова модернизи́рованный, romanized: Avtomat Kalashnikova modernizirovannyy, lit. 'Modernized Kalashnikov automatic rifle') is a 7.62×39 mm Soviet assault rifle introduced in 1959 as a lighter, more modern successor to the AK-47.

Designed by Mikhail Kalashnikov, it became the most widely produced variant of the Kalashnikov series, serving as the standard service rifle of the Soviet Army and Warsaw Pact states. Featuring a gas‑operated rotating bolt, slanted muzzle compensator, and simplified manufacturing for cost‑effective mass production, the AKM enhanced automatic accuracy and reliability while reducing weight by approximately 1 kg.

Though replaced in Soviet frontline units by the AK‑74 in the 1970s, variants of the AKM continue to be manufactured and remain in use today.

== Design details ==
The AKM is an automatic rifle chambered in 7.62×39mm intermediate cartridge. It is selective-fire, gas-operated with a rotating bolt, firing in either semi-automatic or fully automatic, and has a cyclic rate of fire of around 600 rounds per minute (RPM). The gas operated action has a large bolt carrier with a permanently attached long stroke gas piston. The gas chamber is located above the barrel. The bolt carrier rides on the two rails, formed on the side of the receiver, with a significant space between the moving and stationary parts.

=== Improvements over AK-47 ===
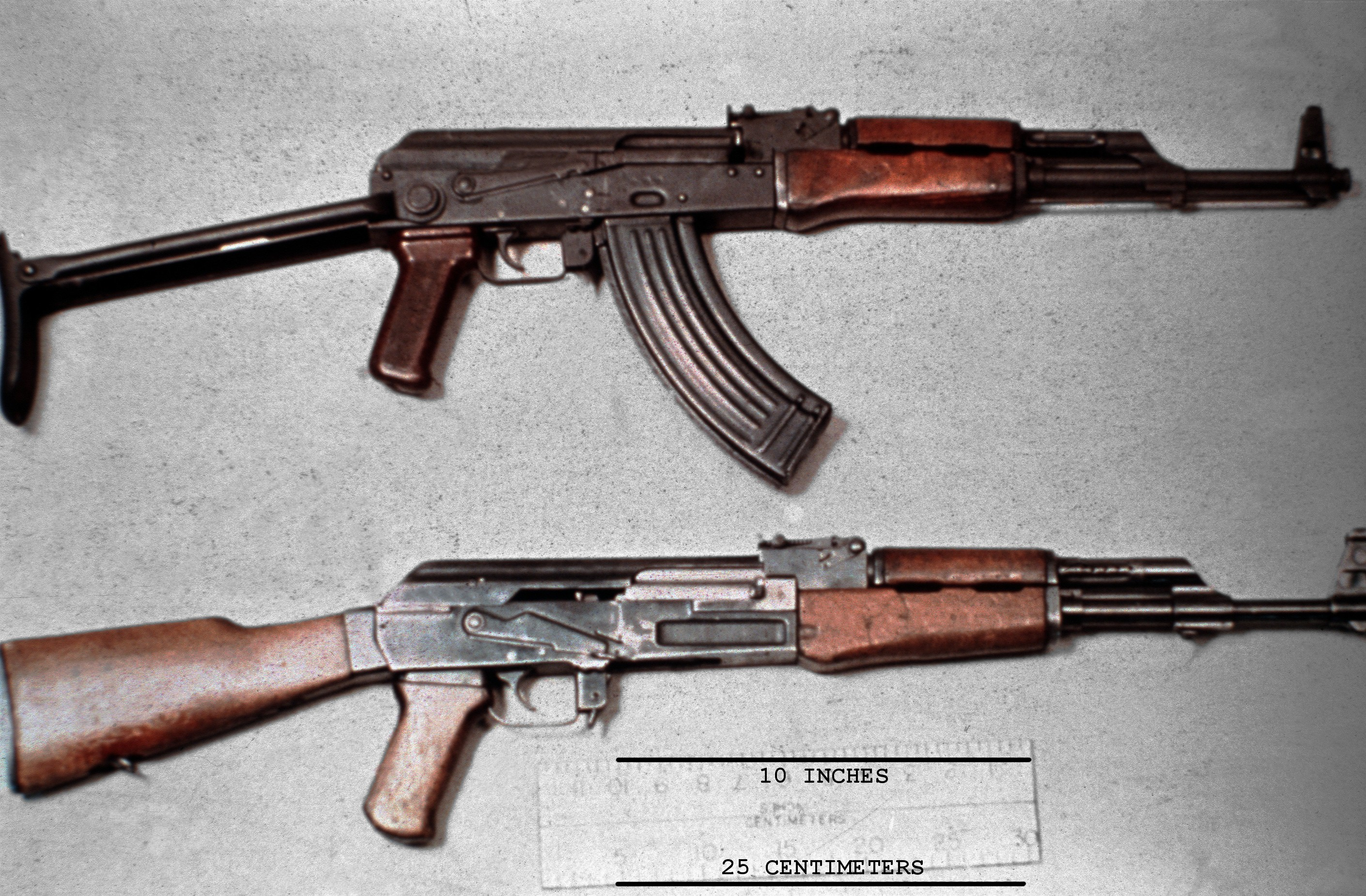
The AKMS (top) compared to an AK-47 (bottom)

Compared with the AK-47, the AKM features detailed improvements and enhancements that optimized the rifle for mass production; some parts and assemblies were conceived using simplified manufacturing methods. Notably, the AK-47's milled steel receiver was replaced by a U-shaped steel stamping. As a result of these modifications, the AKM's weight was reduced by ≈ 1 kg (2.2 lb), the accuracy during automatic fire was increased and several reliability issues were addressed. The AK-47's chrome-lined barrel was retained, a common feature of Soviet weapons which resists wear and corrosion, particularly under harsh field conditions and near-universal Eastern Bloc use of corrosively primed ammunition.

The AKM's receiver is stamped from a smooth 1.0 mm (0.04 in) sheet of steel, compared with the AK-47 where the receiver was machined from a solid block of steel. A rear stock trunnion and forward barrel trunnion are fastened to the U-shaped receiver using rivets. The receiver housing also features a rigid tubular cross-section support that adds structural strength. Guide rails that assist the bolt carrier's movement which also incorporates the ejector are installed inside the receiver through spot welding. As a weight-saving measure, the stamped receiver cover is of thinner gauge metal than that of the AK-47. In order to maintain strength and durability it employs both longitudinal and latitudinal reinforcing ribs.

=== Barrel ===
The AKM has a barrel with a chrome-lined bore and four right-hand grooves at a 240mm (1 in 9.45in) or 31.5 calibers rifling twist rate. The forward barrel trunnion has a non-threaded socket for the barrel and a transverse hole for a pin that secures the barrel in place. The AKM's barrel is installed in the forward trunnion and pinned (as opposed to the AK-47, which has a one piece receiver with integral trunnions and a barrel that is screwed-in). Additionally the barrel has horizontal guide slots that help align and secure the handguards in place. To increase the weapon's accuracy during automatic fire, the AKM was fitted with a slant cut compensator that helps redirect expanding propellant gases upward and to the right during firing, which mitigates the rise of the muzzle during an automatic burst when held by a right-handed firer. The compensator is threaded on to the end of the barrel with a left-hand thread. Not all AKMs have slant compensators; some were also fitted with the older muzzle nut which came from the AK-47. Most AKMs with muzzle nuts were older production models. The AKM's slant compensator can also be used on the AK-47, which had a simple nut to cover the threads.

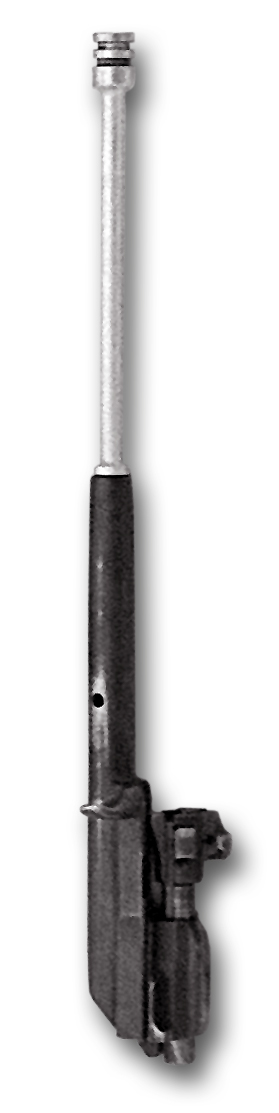
AKM Bolt carrier assembly and gas piston

=== Gas block ===
The gas block in the AKM does not have a cleaning rod capture or sling loop but is instead fitted with an integrated bayonet support collar that has a cleaning rod guide hole. The forward sling loop was relocated to the front handguard retainer cap. The handguard retainer also has notches that determine the position of the handguards on the barrel. The AKM's laminated wood handguards have lateral grooves that help securely grip the rifle.

Gas relief ports that alleviate gas pressure in the piston cylinder (placed horizontally in a row on the gas cylinder in the AK-47) were moved forward to the gas block and placed in a radial arrangement.

=== Bolt carrier assembly ===
The AKM's bolt carrier has a lightening cut milled into the right side halfway before the handle. The handle has its profile slimmed down as well. The stem of the AKM bolt is fluted in another measure to help reduce weight. The round, fluted firing pin of the AK-47 was also replaced with a flat one on the AKM. All pieces are typically painted black instead of left unfinished ("in the white").

=== Stock ===
The buttstock, lower handguard and upper headguard are manufactured from birch plywood laminates like the later model AK-47 furniture. Such engineered woods are stronger and resist warping better than the conventional one-piece patterns, do not require lengthy maturing, and are cheaper. The wooden buttstock used in the AKM is further hollowed in order to reduce weight and is longer and straighter than that of the AK-47, which assists accuracy for subsequent shots during rapid and automatic fire. The wooden stock also houses the issued cleaning kit, which is a small diameter metal tube with a twist lock cap. The kit normally contains the cleaning jag to which a piece of cloth material is wrapped around and dipped into cleaning solution. It also contains a pin punch, an assembly pin to hold the trigger, disconnector and rate reducer together while putting these back into the receiver after cleaning the weapon, and a barrel brush. The kit is secured inside the butt stock via a spring-loaded trapdoor in the stock's pressed sheet metal butt cap. The stock is socketed into a stepped shaped rear trunnion with single upper tang and two screws. The rear trunnion itself is held to the stamped receiver with two long rivets. Under folding models instead have a U-shaped rear trunnion that reinforces the locking arms and is held to the receiver with six rivets (see Variants for more info).

=== Recoil/return spring assembly ===
The AKM uses a modified recoil/return spring mechanism, which replaces the telescoping recoil spring guide rod with a dual U-shaped wire guide.

=== Trigger assembly ===
The AKM has a modified trigger assembly, equipped with a hammer-release delaying device (installed on the same axis pin together with the trigger and disconnector) commonly called a "rate reducer" or "hammer retarder" (Russian: замедлитель срабатывания курка). In fact its primary purpose is not to reduce the rate of automatic fire; it is a safety device to ensure the weapon will only fire on automatic when the bolt is fully locked, as the hammer is tripped by the bolt carrier's last few millimeters of forward movement. The device also reduces "trigger slap" or "trigger bounce" and the weapon's rate of fire, which also reduces the dispersion of bullets when firing in fully automatic mode. The hammer was also changed and equipped with a protrusion that engages the rate reducer and the trigger has only one notched hammer release arm (compared with two parallel arms in the AK-47).

=== Sights ===
The AKM's notched rear tangent iron sight is calibrated in 100 m (109 yd) increments from 100 to 1,000 m (109 to 1,094 yd) and compared with the AK-47 the leaf's position teeth that secure the sliding adjustable notch were transferred over from the right to the left edge of the ramp. The front sight is a post adjustable for elevation in the field and has a slightly different shape with the "ears" being angled with the back of the base instead of straight and its bottom portion is more narrow compared with the AK-47. Horizontal adjustment requires a special drift tool and is done by the armoury before issue or if the need arises by an armourer after issue. The sight line elements are approximately 48.5 mm (1.9 in) over the bore axis. The "point-blank range" battle zero setting "П" on the 7.62×39mm AKM rear tangent sight element corresponds to a 300 m (328 yd) zero. For the AKM combined with service cartridges the 300 m battle zero setting limits the apparent "bullet rise" within approximately −5 to +31 cm (−2.0 to 12.2 in) relative to the line of sight. Soldiers are instructed to fire at any target within this range by simply placing the sights on the center of mass (the belt buckle, according to Russian and former Soviet doctrine) of the enemy target. Any errors in range estimation are tactically irrelevant, as a well-aimed shot will hit the torso of the enemy soldier.

=== Ammunition ===
The weapon uses the same ammunition as the AK-47: the 7.62×39mm M43 intermediate rifle cartridge.

The AKM mechanism's design principles and procedures for loading and firing are practically identical to those of the AK-47, the only difference being the trigger assembly (during the return stage of the bolt carrier on fully automatic mode) as a result of incorporating the rate reducer device.

=== Magazines ===
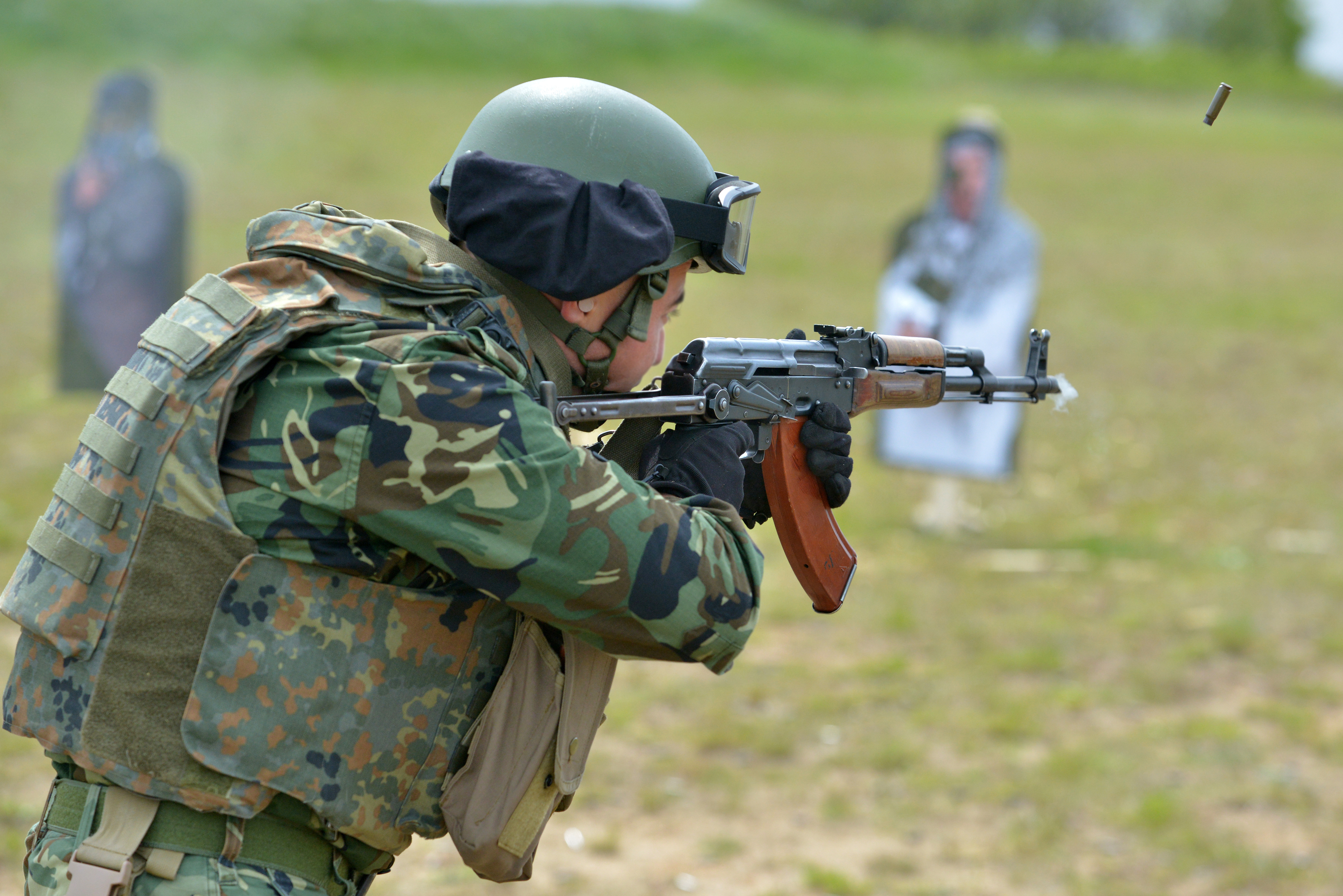
AKMS with a 30-round "bakelite" magazine. Despite their name, the magazines are actually made of fiberglass and resin along with steel reinforcements. The magazine has an "arrow in triangle" Izhmash arsenal mark on the bottom right.

The early slab-sided steel AK-47 30-round detachable box magazines had 1 mm (0.039 in) sheet-metal bodies and weigh 0.43 kg (0.95 lb) empty. The later steel AKM 30-round magazines had lighter sheet-metal bodies with prominent reinforcing ribs weighing 0.33 kg (0.73 lb) empty. To further reduce weight a lightweight magazine with an aluminium body with a prominent reinforcing waffle rib pattern weighing 0.19 kg (0.42 lb) empty was developed for the AKM that proved to be too fragile and the small issued amount of these magazines were quickly withdrawn from service. As a replacement steel-reinforced 30-round plastic 7.62×39mm box magazines were introduced. These magazines discolour over time from yellowish to rust-coloured shades, weigh 0.24 kg (0.53 lb) empty and are often mistakenly identified as being made of Bakelite (a phenolic resin), but were actually fabricated from two-parts of AG-4S moulding compound (a glass-reinforced phenol-formaldehyde binder impregnated composite), assembled using an epoxy resin adhesive. Noted for their durability, these magazines did, however, compromise the rifle's camouflage and lacked the small horizontal reinforcing ribs running down both sides of the magazine body near the front that were added on all later plastic magazine generations. A second generation steel-reinforced dark-brown (colour shades vary from maroon to plum to near black) 30-round 7.62×39mm magazine was introduced in the early 1980s, fabricated from ABS plastic. The third generation steel-reinforced 30-round 7.62×39mm magazine is similar to the second generation, but is darker coloured and has a matte non-reflective surface finish. The current issue steel-reinforced matte true black non-reflective surface finished 7.62×39mm 30-round magazines, fabricated from ABS plastic weigh 0.25 kg (0.55 lb) empty. Early steel AK-47 magazines are 9.75 in (248 mm) long, and the later ribbed steel AKM and newer plastic 7.62×39mm magazines are about 1 in (25 mm) shorter.

The transition from steel to mainly plastic magazines yielded a significant weight reduction and allow a soldier to carry more rounds for the same weight.

Rifle	Cartridge	Cartridge weight	Weight of empty magazine	Weight of loaded magazine	Max. 10.12 kg (22.3 lb) ammunition load*
AK-47 (1949)	7.62×39mm	16.3 g (252 gr)	slab-sided steel 430 g (0.95 lb)	30-rounds 916 g (2.019 lb)	11 magazines for 330 rounds 10.08 kg (22.2 lb)
AKM (1959)	7.62×39mm	16.3 g (252 gr)	ribbed stamped-steel 330 g (0.73 lb)	30-rounds 819 g (1.806 lb)	12 magazines for 360 rounds 9.83 kg (21.7 lb)
AK-103 (1994)	7.62×39mm	16.3 g (252 gr)	steel-reinforced plastic 250 g (0.55 lb)	30-rounds 739 g (1.629 lb)	13 magazines for 390 rounds 9.61 kg (21.2 lb)

Note: All 7.62×39mm AK magazines are backwards compatible with older AK variants.
*10.12 kg (22.3 lb) is the maximum amount of ammo that the average soldier can comfortably carry. It also allows for best comparison of the three most common 7.62×39mm AK-style magazines.

=== Accessories ===
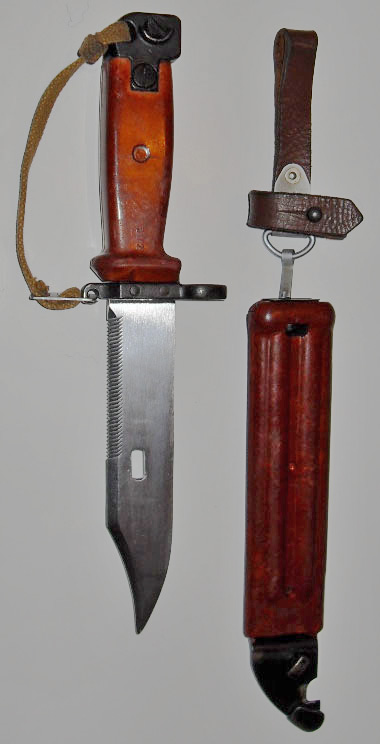
A 6H4-type bayonet and scabbard.

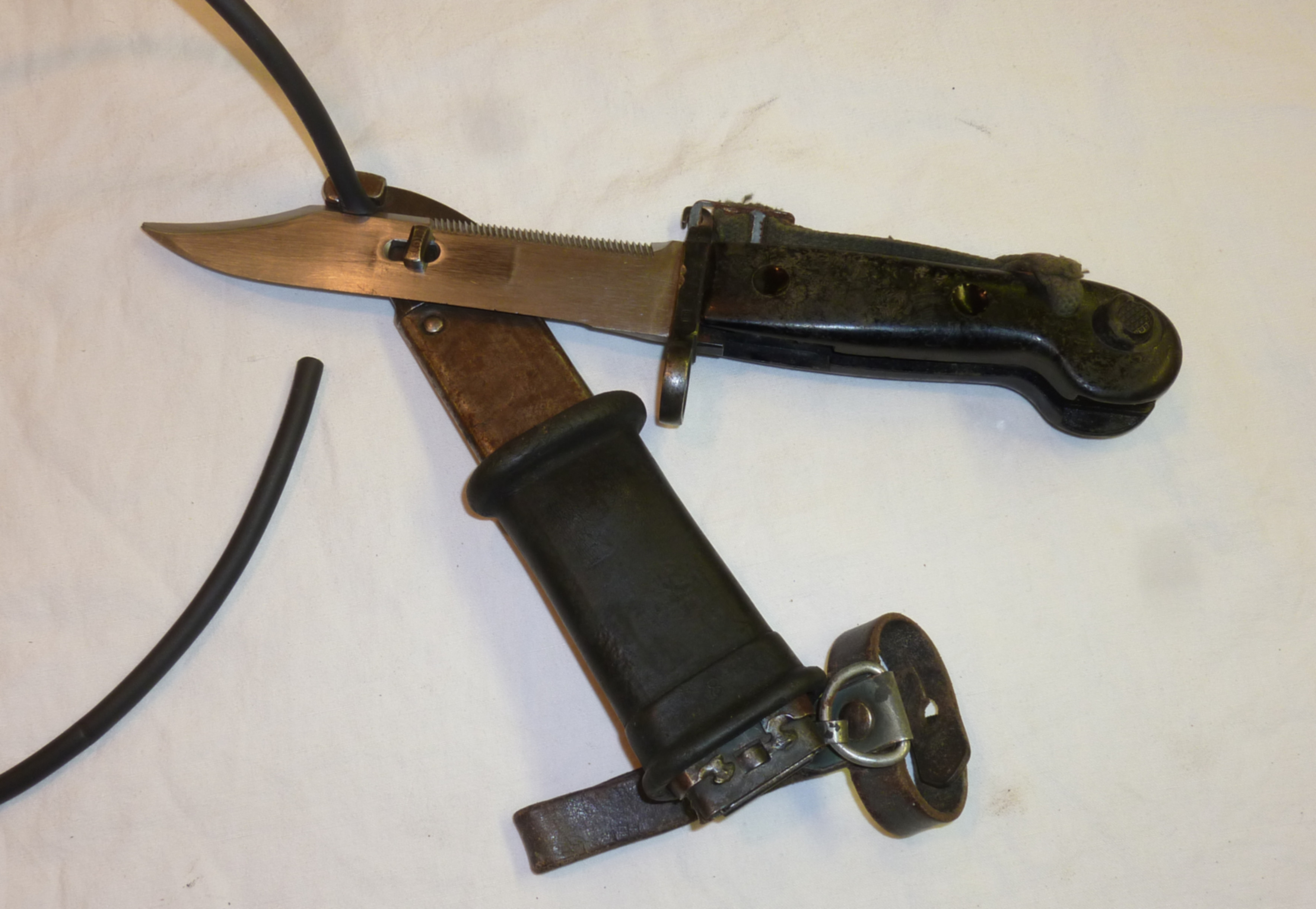
AKM Type I bayonet of the Nationale Volksarmee that has cut an electrical wire.

The AKM comes supplied with a different accessory kit that contains a M1959 6H4 or 6H3-type bayonet and comes with synthetic or steel magazines. Both the 6H3 and 6H4 bayonet blade forms a wire-cutting device when coupled with its scabbard. The polymer grip and upper part of the scabbard provide insulation from the metal blade and bottom part of the metal scabbard, using a rubber insulator sleeve, to safely cut electrified wire. The kit also comes with a punch used to drive out various pins and a device that aids in assembling the rate reducing mechanism. The GP-25 Grenade launcher can also be fitted onto the AKM. There is also the PBS-1 silencer from the 1960s, designed to reduce the noise when firing, mostly used by Spetsnaz forces and the KGB.

== Variants ==
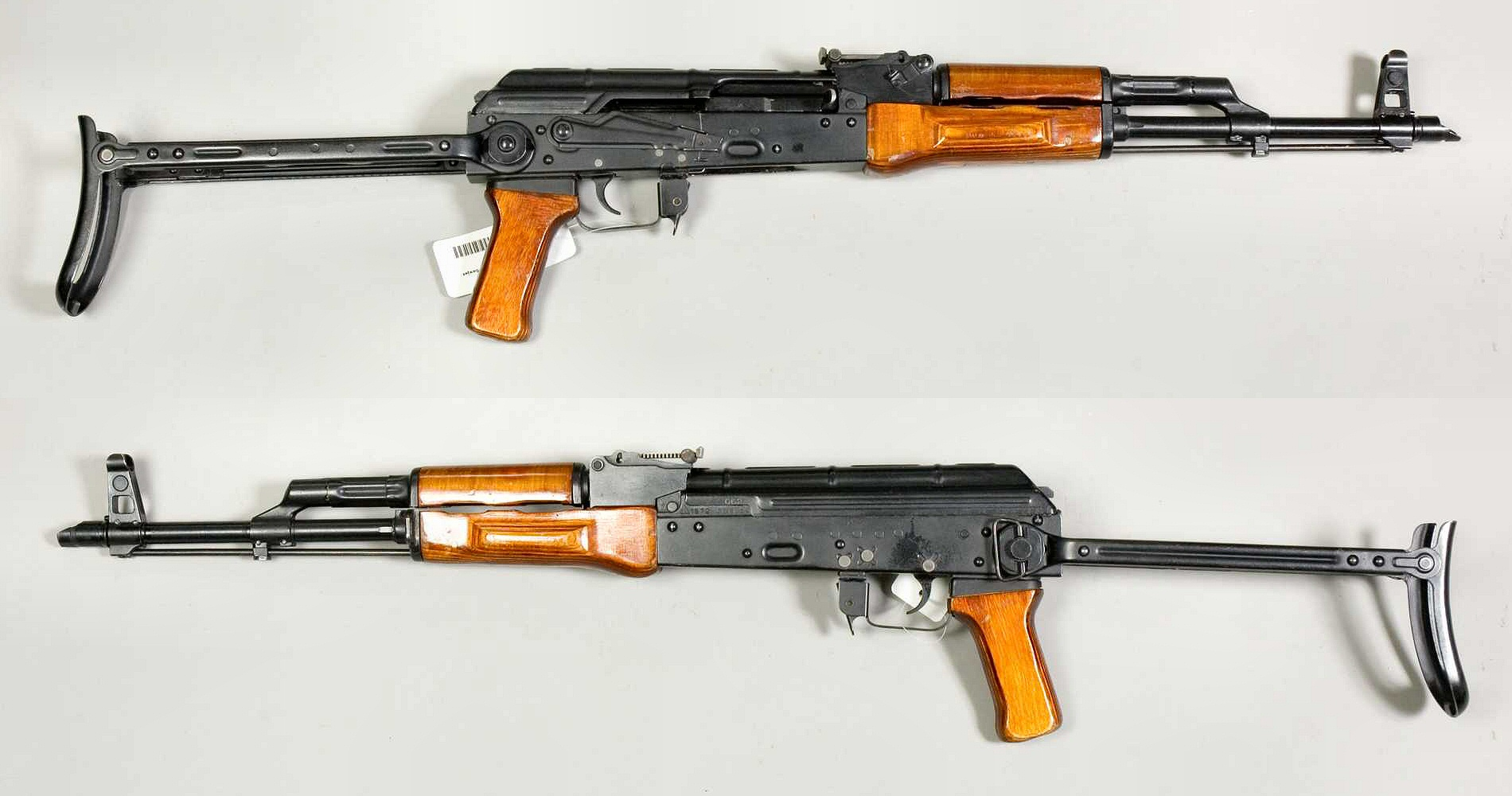
An AKMS without its magazine.

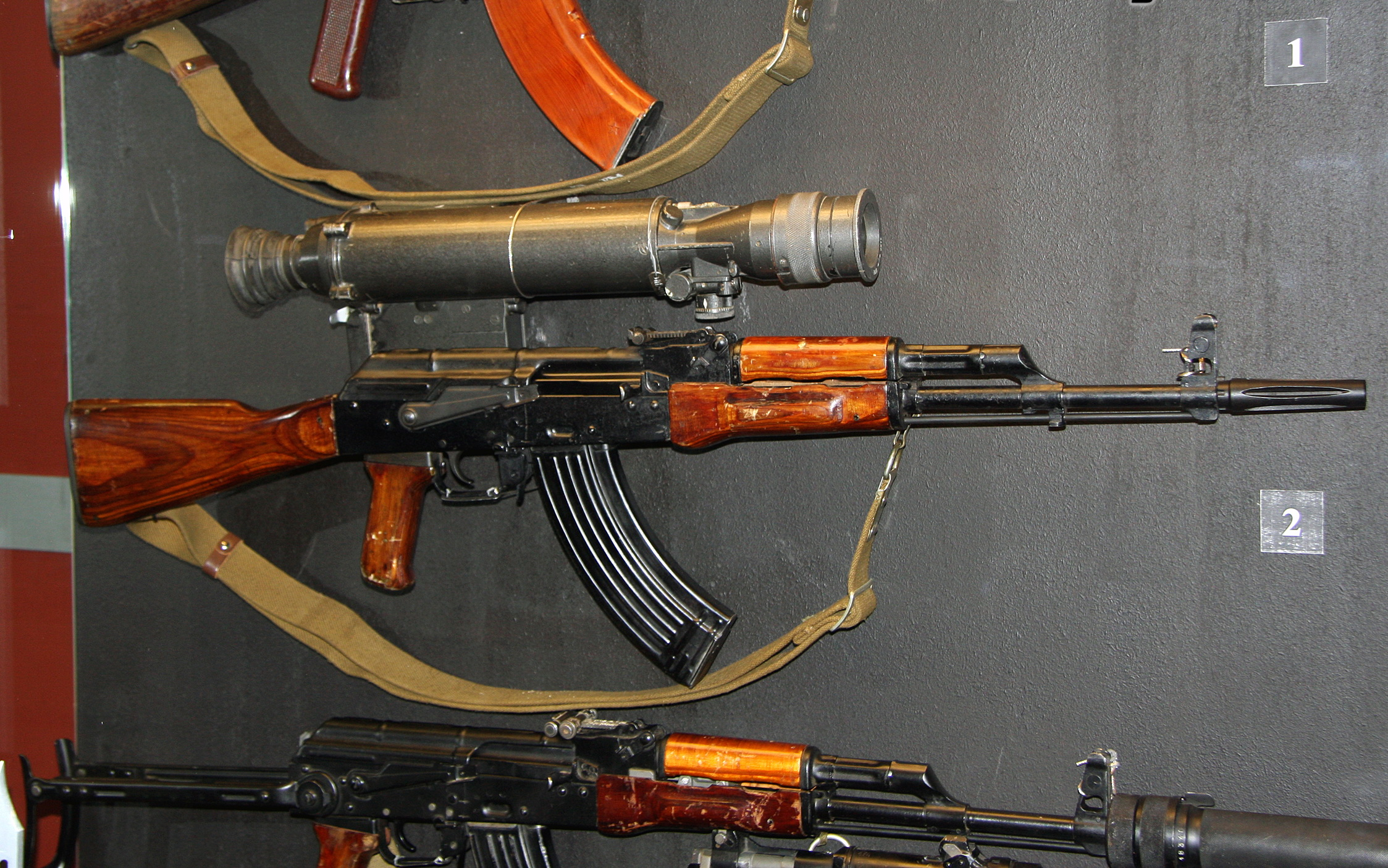
An AKML with a NSP-3.

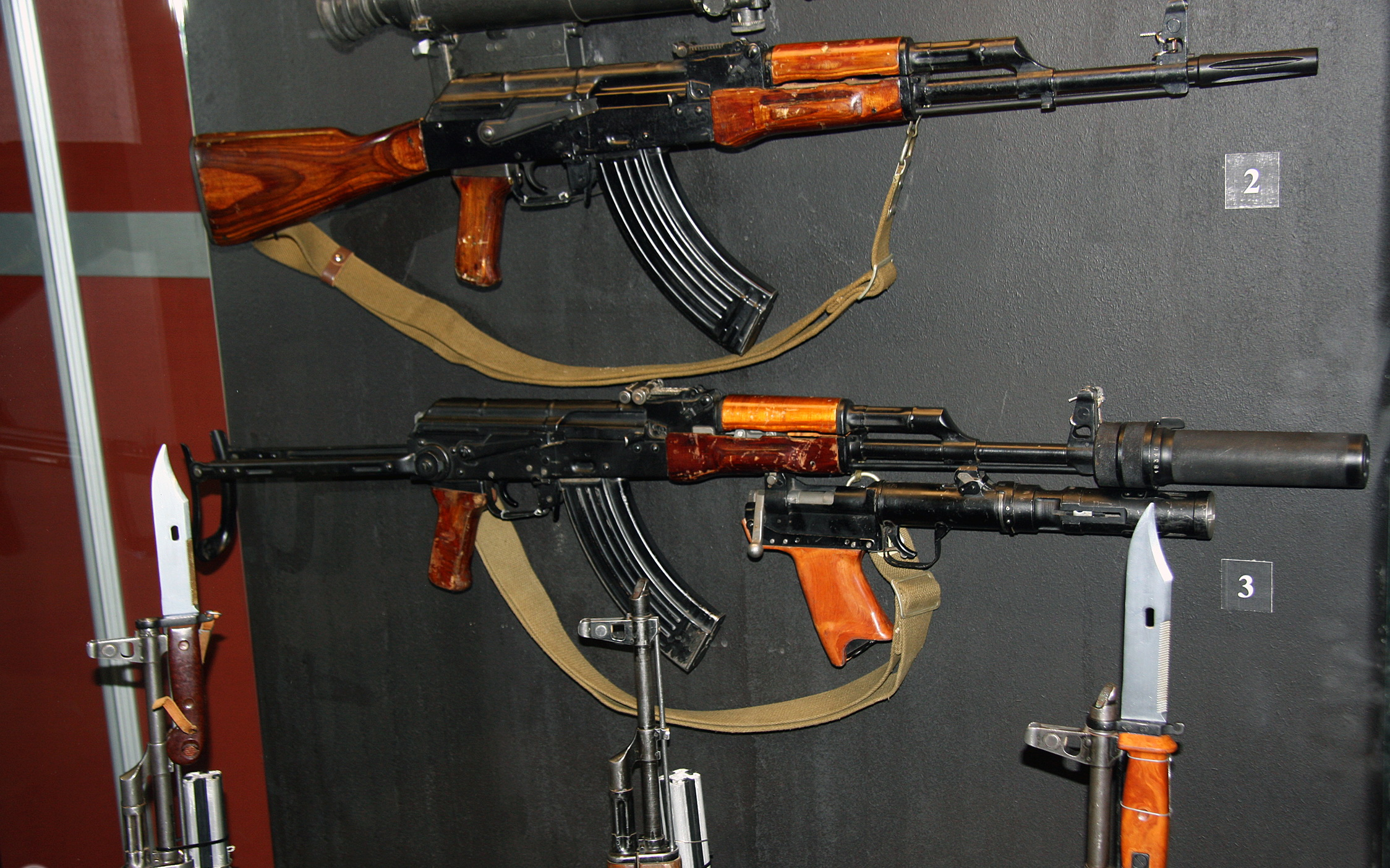
AKMS with sound suppressor and silent BS-1 Tishina grenade launcher attached.

The main variant of the AKM is the AKMS (S – Skladnoy – Folding), which was equipped with an under-folding metal shoulder stock in place of the fixed wooden stock. The metal stock of the AKMS is somewhat different from the folding stock of the previous AKS-47 model as it has a modified locking mechanism, which locks both support arms of the AKMS stock instead of just one (left arm) as in the AKS-47 folding model. It is also made of riveted steel pressings, instead of the milled versions of most AKS-47s, and is more inline like the fixed stock AKM. Due to the stamped receiver, it also has a reinforcement plate beneath the pistol grip spot welded in place to prevent damage to the receiver if the gun is dropped on its pistol grip as well as better absorb the recoil with the stock folded.

The AKM was produced in the following versions: AKMP, AKML and AKMLP, whereas the AKMS led to the following models – AKMSP, AKMSN and AKMSNP. It is designed especially for use by paratroopers–as the folding stock permits more space for other equipment when jumping from a plane and then landing.

The AKMP rifle uses subdued radium-illuminated aiming points integrated into the front and rear sight. These sights enable targets to be engaged in low-light conditions, e.g. when the battlefield is illuminated with flares, fires or muzzle flashes or when the target is visible as a shadow against an illuminated background. The sliding notch on the sight arm is then moved to the "S" setting (which corresponds to the "3” setting in the AKM). The sight itself is guided on the sliding scale and has a socket, which contains a tritium gas-filled capsule directly beneath the day-time notch. The tritium front post installs into the front sight base using a detent and spring.

The AKML comes equipped with a side-rail used to attach a night vision device. The mount comprises a flat plate riveted to the left wall of the receiver housing and a support bracket fixed to the mounting base with screws. To shield the light-sensitive photo detector plate of the night vision sight, the weapon uses a slotted flash suppressor, which replaces the standard recoil compensator. The AKML can also be deployed in the prone position with a detachable barrel-mounted bipod that helps stabilise the weapon and reduces operator fatigue during prolonged periods of observation. The bipod is supplied as an accessory and is carried in a holster attached to the duty belt.

The AKMN comes equipped with a side-rail used to attach a night vision device. The model designated AKMN-1 can thus mount the multi-model night vision scope 1PN51 and the AKMN2 the multi-model night vision scope 1PN58.

The AKMLP is a version of the AKML with tritium sights (as in the AKMP).

The AKMSP rifle is based on the folding stock AKMS variant but fitted with tritium night sights, as in the AKMP.

The AKMSN model is derived from the AKMS and features an accessory rail used to mount a night vision sensor as seen on the AKML and additionally a flash hider and bipod. The left arm of the AKMSN's folding stock is bent outwards in order to avoid the sight mount bracket during folding and the sling loop was moved further to the rear. Similarly to the AKMN-1, the AKMSN-1 can mount the multi-model night vision scope 1PN51 and the AKMSN2 the multi-model night vision scope 1PN58.

A version of the AKMSN additionally supplied with factory tritium night sights is called the AKMSNP.

A version of the AKM with a modified lower handguard designed to accept the 40 mm wz. 1974 Pallad grenade launcher was developed in Poland and designated the karabinek-granatnik wz. 1974.

=== Foreign variants ===
==== East Germany ====
Produced locally. Examples include the MPi-KM (fixed stock) and MPi-KMS/MPi-KMS-72 (side-folding stock). East German guns used brown Bakelite furniture in place of wood.

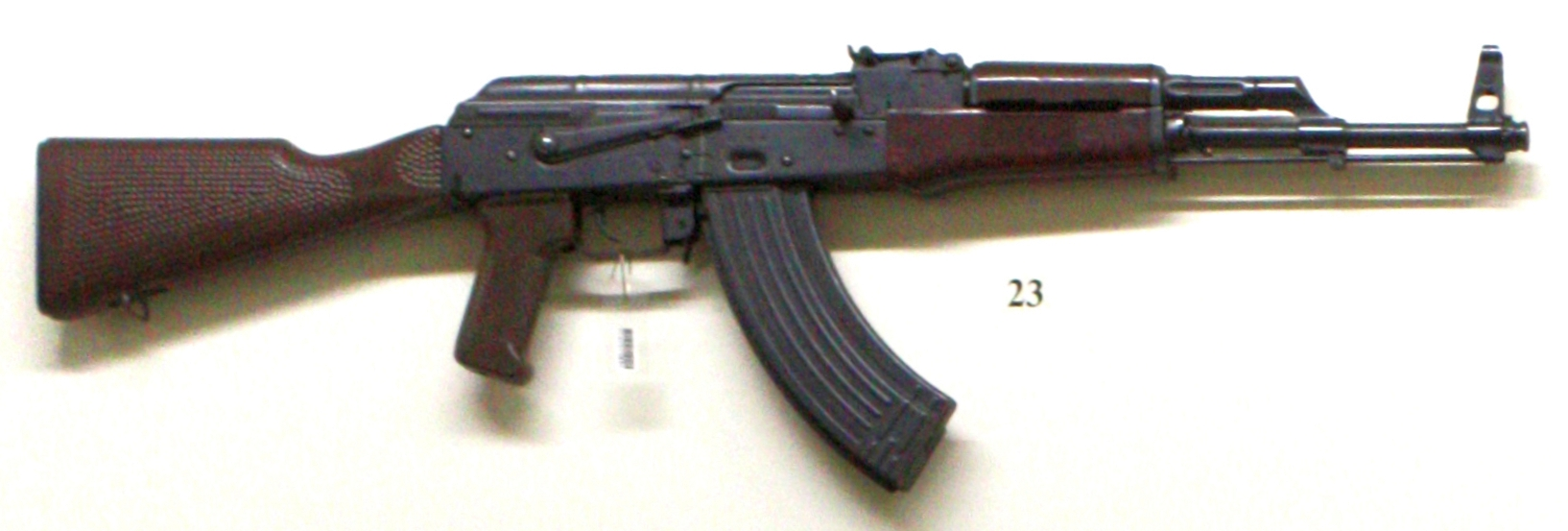
MPi-KM with fixed stock.

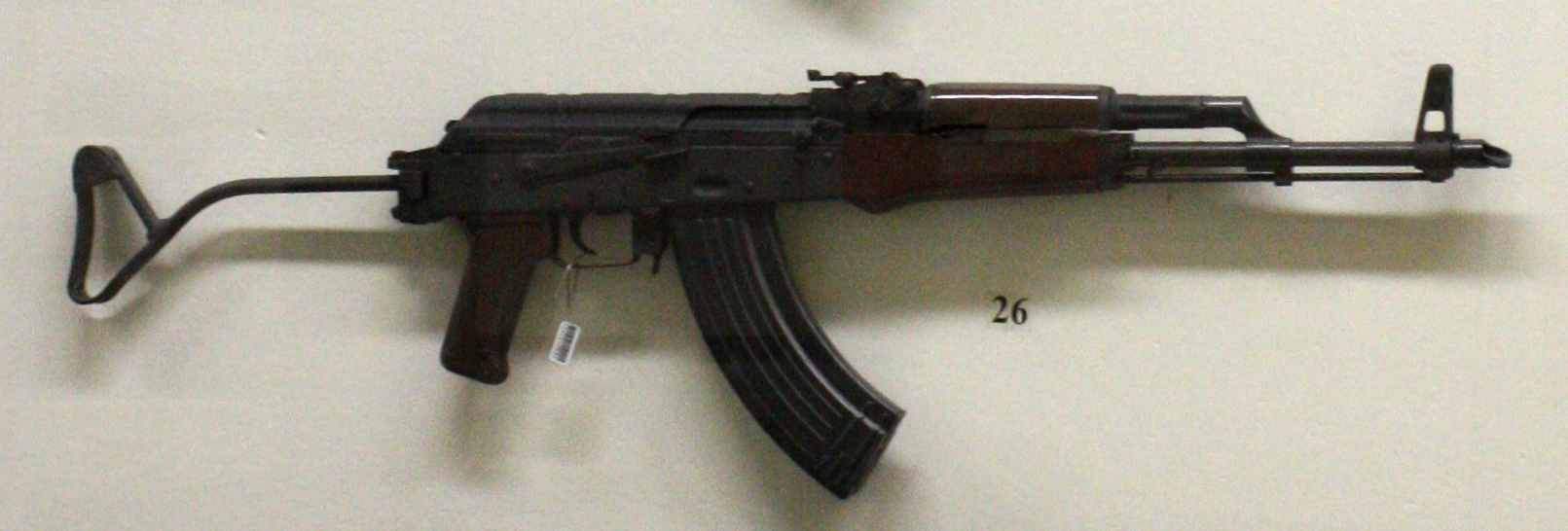
MPi-KMS-72 with side folding stock.

==== Peru ====
Diseños Casanave International LLC has made an upgraded version of the AKM known as the Diseños Casanave International LLC SC-2026, which has a retractable polycarbonate stock and a railed handguard. It has a range of 400 meters and weighs less than 4 kilograms.

DICI also makes the Diseños Casanave International LLC SC-2026C, a carbine version of the SC-2026 made for vehicle crews/personnel and for special forces operators.

==== Vietnam ====
The STL-1A was made by Z111 Factory as early as 2015 by changing parts of used AKMs with new plastic handguards, folding buttstocks, pistol grips and muzzle brakes resembling the AK-74, with an attachment lug for use with an M203 grenade launcher. In 2018, an upgrade, known as the STL-1B was developed, which included Picatinny rails, since the 1A uses a side-type attachment.

==== Romania ====
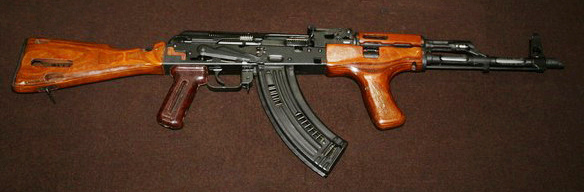
Cutaway of the PM md. 1963.

The Pistol Mitralieră model 1963 (abbreviated PM md. 63 or simply md. 63) is a Romanian assault rifle chambered in the 7.62×39mm cartridge, patterned after the AKM. It is exported as AIM.

==== Hungary ====
The AK-63 (also known in Hungarian military service as the AMM) is a Hungarian variant of the AKM assault rifle manufactured by the Fegyver- és Gépgyár (FÉG) state arms plant in Hungary. It is currently used by the Hungarian Ground Forces as its standard infantry weapon, and by most other branches of the Hungarian Defence Forces.

==== China ====
The Type 56 (Chinese: 56式自动步枪; literally; "Type 56 Automatic Rifle") also known as the AK-56, is a Chinese 7.62×39mm rifle. It is a variant of the Soviet-designed AK-47 (specifically Type 3) and AKM rifles. Production started in 1956 at State Factory 66 but was eventually handed over to Norinco and PolyTech, who continue to manufacture the rifle primarily for export.

==== North Korea ====
The Type 68 also known as Type 68 NK, is a North Korean version of the AKM, adopted in 1968 to replace the Type 58. It has no rate reducer. It has its own bayonet, which is based on the AK-47 bayonet, but it has a different pommel mount for it. These bayonets were also issued in Cuba, which have green scabbards instead of tan scabbards, which is used in the Korean People's Army.

==== South Korea ====
The DAK-47 is an exact copy of the AKM made by Dasan Machineries for export customers.

=== Semi-automatic only variant ===
The WASR-10 is a semi-automatic only variant developed from the AKM series rifle but is not another version rather a derivative or variant due to significant changes. The lack of the dimple over the magazine well is a peculiar WASR feature helpful in identification of WASR series rifles.

The WASR series are manufactured in Romania by the arms-maker Cugir and widely imported into the United States for the sporting gun market by importer Century International Arms who modifies them with TAPCO stocks. Century began installing the TAPCO Intrafuse AK G2 trigger group in 2007 to eliminate bolt slap trigger finger injuries.

== Accuracy potential ==
The following table represents the Russian method for determining accuracy, which is far more complex than Western methods. In the West, one fires a group of shots into the target and then simply measures the overall diameter of the group. The Russians, on the other hand, fire a group of shots into the target. They then draw two circles on the target, one for the maximum vertical dispersion of hits and one for the maximum horizontal dispersion of hits. They then disregard the hits on the outer part of the target and only count half of the hits (50% or R_{50}) on the inner part of the circles. This dramatically reduces the overall diameter of the groups. They then use both the vertical and horizontal measurements of the reduced groups to measure accuracy. This circular error probable method used by the Russian and other European militaries cannot be converted and is not comparable to US military methods for determining rifle accuracy. When the R_{50} results are doubled the hit probability increases to 93.7%.

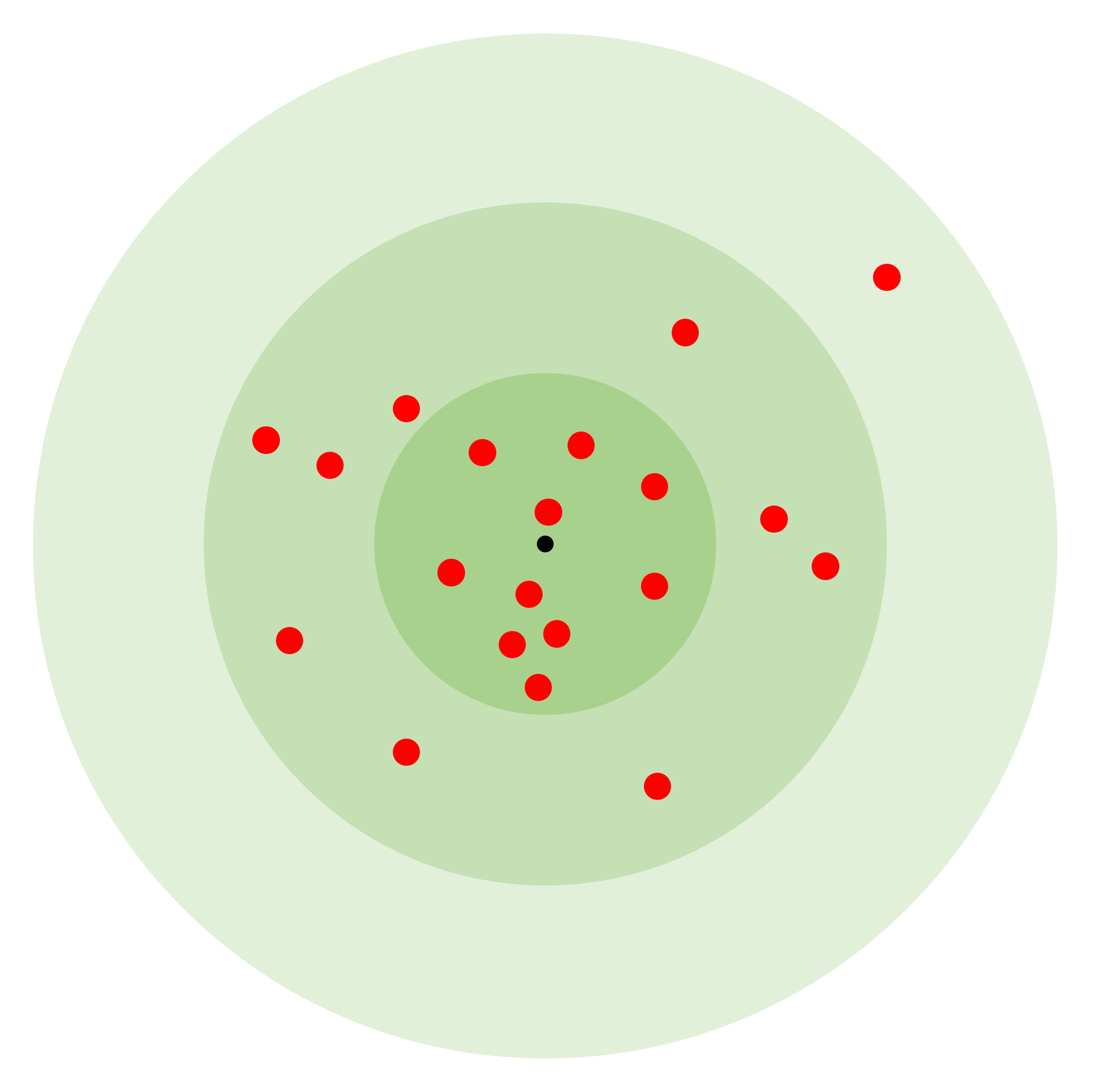
Circular error probable 20 hits distribution example

AKM short burst dispersion with 57-N-231 steel core service ammunition
Range	Vertical accuracy of fire (R_{50})	Horizontal accuracy of fire (R_{50})	Remaining bullet energy	Remaining bullet velocity
0 m (0 yd)	0 cm (0.0 in)	0 cm (0.0 in)	2,036 J (1,502 ft⋅lbf)	718 m/s (2,356 ft/s)
100 m (109 yd)	8 cm (3.1 in)	11 cm (4.3 in)	1,540 J (1,140 ft⋅lbf)	624 m/s (2,047 ft/s)
200 m (219 yd)	15 cm (5.9 in)	22 cm (8.7 in)	1,147 J (846 ft⋅lbf)	539 m/s (1,768 ft/s)
300 m (328 yd)	23 cm (9.1 in)	33 cm (13.0 in)	843 J (622 ft⋅lbf)	462 m/s (1,516 ft/s)
400 m (437 yd)	31 cm (12.2 in)	44 cm (17.3 in)	618 J (456 ft⋅lbf)	395 m/s (1,296 ft/s)
500 m (547 yd)	39 cm (15.4 in)	56 cm (22.0 in)	461 J (340 ft⋅lbf)	342 m/s (1,122 ft/s)
600 m (656 yd)	47 cm (18.5 in)	67 cm (26.4 in)	363 J (268 ft⋅lbf)	303 m/s (994 ft/s)
700 m (766 yd)	55 cm (21.7 in)	78 cm (30.7 in)	314 J (232 ft⋅lbf)	282 m/s (925 ft/s)
800 m (875 yd)	64 cm (25.2 in)	90 cm (35.4 in)	284 J (209 ft⋅lbf)	268 m/s (879 ft/s)

- R_{50} means the closest 50 percent of the shot group will all be within a circle of the mentioned diameter.

In general, this is an improvement with respect to firing accuracy to the AK-47. The vertical and horizontal mean (R_{50}) deviations with service ammunition at 800 m (875 yd) for AK platforms are.

SKS, AK-47, AKM, and AK-74 dispersion at 800 m (875 yd)
Rifle	Firing mode	Vertical accuracy of fire (R_{50})	Horizontal accuracy of fire (R_{50})
SKS (1945)	semi-automatic	38 cm (15.0 in)	29 cm (11.4 in)
AK-47 (1949)	semi-automatic	49 cm (19.3 in)	34 cm (13.4 in)
AK-47 (1949)	short burst	76 cm (29.9 in)	89 cm (35.0 in)
AKM (1959)	short burst	64 cm (25.2 in)	90 cm (35.4 in)
AK-74 (1974)	short burst	48 cm (18.9 in)	64 cm (25.2 in)

== Users ==
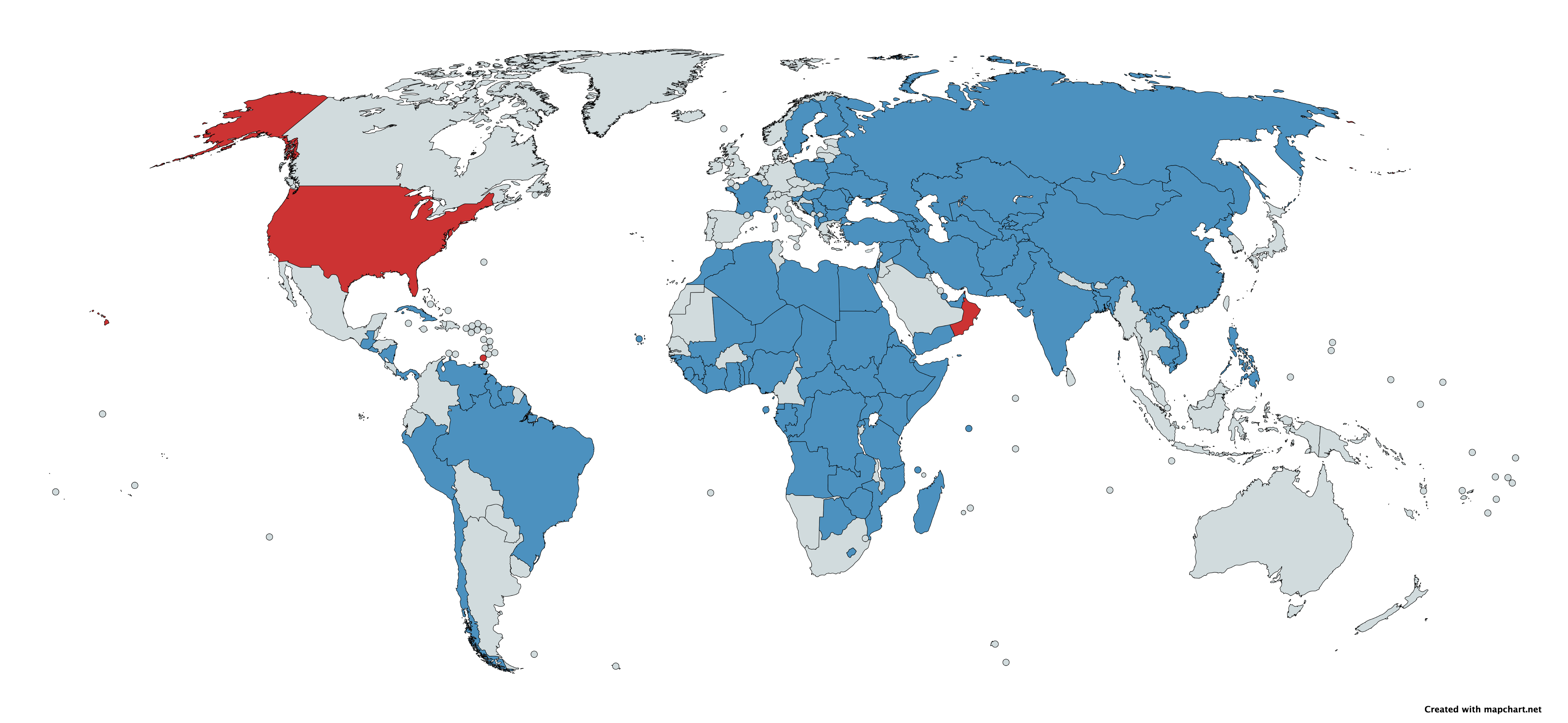
A map with AKM users in blue and former users in red

=== Current ===
- (Islamic Republic of Afghanistan) / Afghanistan
- Albania
- Algeria
- Angola
- Armenia: Used since the Soviet era.
- Azerbaijan: Used since the Soviet era.
- Bangladesh
- Belarus: Used since the Soviet era.
- Benin
- Bosnia-Herzegovina:
- Bulgaria
- Cambodia
- Cape Verde
- Central African Republic
- Chad
- Chile: Used by Salvador Allende and his personal guard during the 1973 Chilean coup d'état and committed suicide with it.
- China: Type 56 variant.
- Comoros
- Congo-Brazzaville
- Congo-Kinshasa
- Cuba: Produced locally under license. Also used Type 68s in the 1980s.
- Djibouti
- Egypt: The Maadi is an Egyptian copy of the AKM, manufactured by Factory 54 of the Maadi Company for Engineering Industries in Cairo for the Egyptian Army and for export sales.
- El Salvador: Ex-guerilla rifles used by the National Civil Police.
- Equatorial Guinea
- Eritrea
- Ethiopia
- Finland: Holds stocks of imported AKM clones for wartime reserve service (the Chinese Type 56 known as the RK 56 TP and the East German MPi-KM as the RK 72) along with locally designed AK derivatives (the Rk 62 and the Rk 95 TP).
- France: 100 Polish made AKM rifles obtained for CENTIAL-51e RI training center
- Gabon
- Georgia: Used since the Soviet era.
- Ghana: Used by Ministry of Interior units.
- Guinea
- Guinea-Bissau
- Guyana
- Hungary: There is a Hungarian derivative of the AKM called 'AK-63' manufactured by FÉG. The AK-63 comes with a fixed wooden or plastic stock, but there is a version with an under-folding metal stock called AK-63D.
- India: Various models of AKM and AKM style rifle in use. A local variant developed and manufactured by the Rifle Factory Ishapore.
- Indonesia: Indonesian Marine Corps used a modified AKM called 'AKM 103', customized AKM rechambered in 5.56×45mm NATO by the Czech arms company Excalibur Army.
- Iran: From East German manufacturers in the Iran Army, Soviet and Chinese manufacturers in IRGC and Iran Police.
- Iraq: From Soviet, German and Romanian manufactures.
  - Kurdistan
- Israel: Captured from Arab armies over the course of the Arab–Israeli conflict.
- Ivory Coast
- Kazakhstan: Used since the Soviet era.
- Kenya: Kenyan police responding to the 2013 Westgate shopping mall shooting, seen armed with AKM and variant rifles.
- Kuwait
- Kyrgyzstan: Used since the Soviet era.
- Laos
- Lesotho
- Liberia
- Libya
- Madagascar
- Mali: Armed and Security Forces of Mali.
- Malta: Armed Forces of Malta.
- Moldova: Used since the Soviet era.
- Mongolia
- Morocco
- Mozambique
- Nicaragua
- Niger
- Nigeria
- North Korea: Type 68 variant. The variant does not have a rate reducer.
- North Macedonia
- Pakistan: Type 56 variant.
- Palestine: MPi-KMS-72 rifles supplied by East Germany to the PLO. Currently in service with the Palestinian National Security forces.
- Panamá: Used by National Border Service (SENAFRONT) and National Aeronaval Service (SENAN). Both Soviet and East-German made rifles formerly used by the defunct Panama Defense Forces.
- Peru Paratroopers and military police only.
- Philippines: Philippine Army. - 5,000 units donated by Russian Federation in 2016. Used by the First Scout Ranger Regiment and Citizen Armed Force Geographical Unit.
- Poland: Used for training and mobilization.
- Qatar
- Romania: Produced locally as the PM md. 63.
- Russia: Used since the Soviet era. Still in limited military and police use. Officially replaced in most Russian military units by the AK-74. Some usage mainly in urban environments due to the ability to penetrate heavy cover.
- São Tomé and Príncipe
- Seychelles
- Sierra Leone
- Slovenia
- Somalia
- South Sudan: 40,500 Soviet-made bought from Ukraine in 2010, used by security forces.
- Sudan
- Suriname
- Sweden: A small number of AKM's are used by the Swedish Armed Forces for familiarization training, but they are not issued to combat units.
- (Syrian opposition) Syria
- Tajikistan: Used since the Soviet era.
- Tanzania
- Togo
- Turkey
- Turkmenistan: Used since the Soviet era.
- Uganda
- Ukraine: Used since the Soviet era. Still in limited use, officially replaced in most Ukrainian military units by the AK-74. AKMS used by Ukrainian Security Service.
- United Arab Emirates
- Uzbekistan: Used since the Soviet era.
- Venezuela MPi-KM and MPi-KMS-72.
- Vietnam AKM, Type 56 assault rifle and North Korean Type 68 variants. Standard infantry rifle of the Vietnamese Army.
- Yemen
- Zambia
- Zimbabwe

=== Non-state current ===
- Islamic State
- Lord Resistance Army
- Somaliland
- Transnistria

=== Former ===
- Ba'athist Syria
- Chechen Republic of Ichkeria - Used by Chechen forces during the First Chechen War
- East Germany Produced locally. Examples include the MPi-KM (fixed stock) and MPi-KMS-72 (side-folding stock).
- Grenada
- Rwanda: Including at least 450 Egyptian-supplied Misrs.
- Rhodesia: Captured AKM rifles were issued primarily to helicopter crews.
- Soviet Union
- United States: Captured rifles were used in Vietnam and other conflicts.
- South Vietnam: The ARVN were supplied with captured AKM rifles.

=== Non-state former ===
- Dhofari rebels
- Donetsk People's Republic
- Farabundo Martí National Liberation Front: Received Type 68s in the 1980s.
- Provisional Irish Republican Army
- Revolutionary Armed Forces of Colombia
- Luhansk People's Republic

== Conflicts ==
=== 1960s ===
- Vietnam War (1955–1975)
- Laotian Civil War (1959–1975)
- Guatemalan Civil War (1960–1996)
- Portuguese Colonial War (1961–1974)
- Eritrean War of Independence (1961–1991)
- The Troubles (Late 1960s–1998)
- Rhodesian Bush War (1964–1979)
- South African Border War (1966–1990)
- Six-Day War (1967)
- Cambodian Civil War (1967–1975)
- Warsaw Pact invasion of Czechoslovakia (1968)
- Sino-Soviet Border Conflict (1969)

=== 1970s ===
- Yom Kippur War (1973)
- Ethiopian Civil War (1974–1991)
- Lebanese Civil War (1975–1990)
- Angolan Civil War (1975–2002)
- Insurgency in Aceh (1976–2005)
- Mozambican Civil War (1977–1992)
- Nicaraguan Revolution (1978–1990)
- Chadian–Libyan War (1978–1987)
- Kurdish–Turkish conflict (1978–2025)
- Cambodian–Vietnamese War (1978–1989)
- Sino-Vietnamese War (1979)
- Salvadoran Civil War (1979–1992)
- Soviet–Afghan War (1979–1989)

=== 1980s ===
- Iran–Iraq War (1980–1988)
- Second Sudanese Civil War (1983–2005)
- Sri Lankan Civil War (1983–2009)
- United States invasion of Grenada (1983)
- Lord's Resistance Army insurgency (1987–present)
- First Liberian Civil War (1989–1997)

=== 1990s ===
- Gulf War (1990–1991)
- Rwandan Civil War (1990–1994)
- Somali Civil War (1991–present)
- Yugoslav Wars (1991–2001)
- Georgian Civil War (1991–1993)
- Algerian Civil War (1991–2002)
- First Chechen War (1994–1996)
- Eritrean–Ethiopian War (1998–2000)
- Second Liberian Civil War (1999–2003)
- Second Chechen War (1999–2009)

=== 2000s ===
- War in Afghanistan (2001–2021)
- First Ivorian Civil War (2002–2007)
- Iraq War (2003–2011)
- War in Darfur (2003–2020)
- Mexican drug war (2006–present)
- Russo-Georgian War (2008)
- Boko Haram insurgency (2009–present)

=== 2010s ===
- Second Ivorian Civil War (2010–2011)
- First Libyan Civil War (2011)
- Syrian Civil War (2011–2024)
- Central African Republic Civil War (2012–present)
- War in Iraq (2013–2017)
- Second Libyan Civil War (2014–2020)
- Russo-Ukrainian War (2014–present)
- Yemeni Civil War (2014–present)
- Insurgency in Cabo Delgado (2017–present)
- Ethiopian civil conflict (2018–present)

=== 2020s ===
- Second Nagorno-Karabakh War (2020)
- 2021 Taliban offensive
- Tigray War (2020–2022)
- Kyrgyzstan–Tajikistan clashes (2021)
- Russo-Ukrainian war (2022–present)
- Banjska attack (2023)
- War in Amhara (2023–present)
- Gaza war (2023–present)
- 2024 Israeli invasion of Lebanon
- 2026 Afghanistan–Pakistan war (2026–present)

== Gallery ==
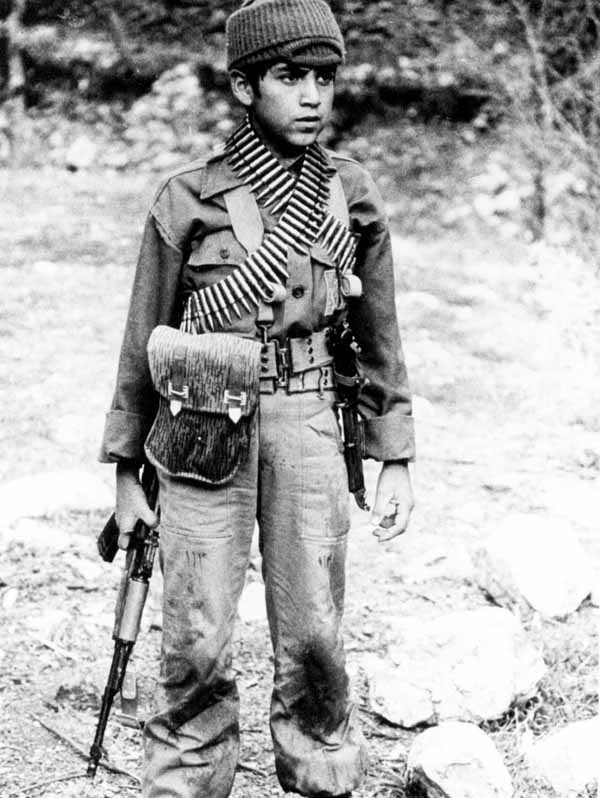
An Iranian child soldier holding an AKM in the Iran–Iraq War.

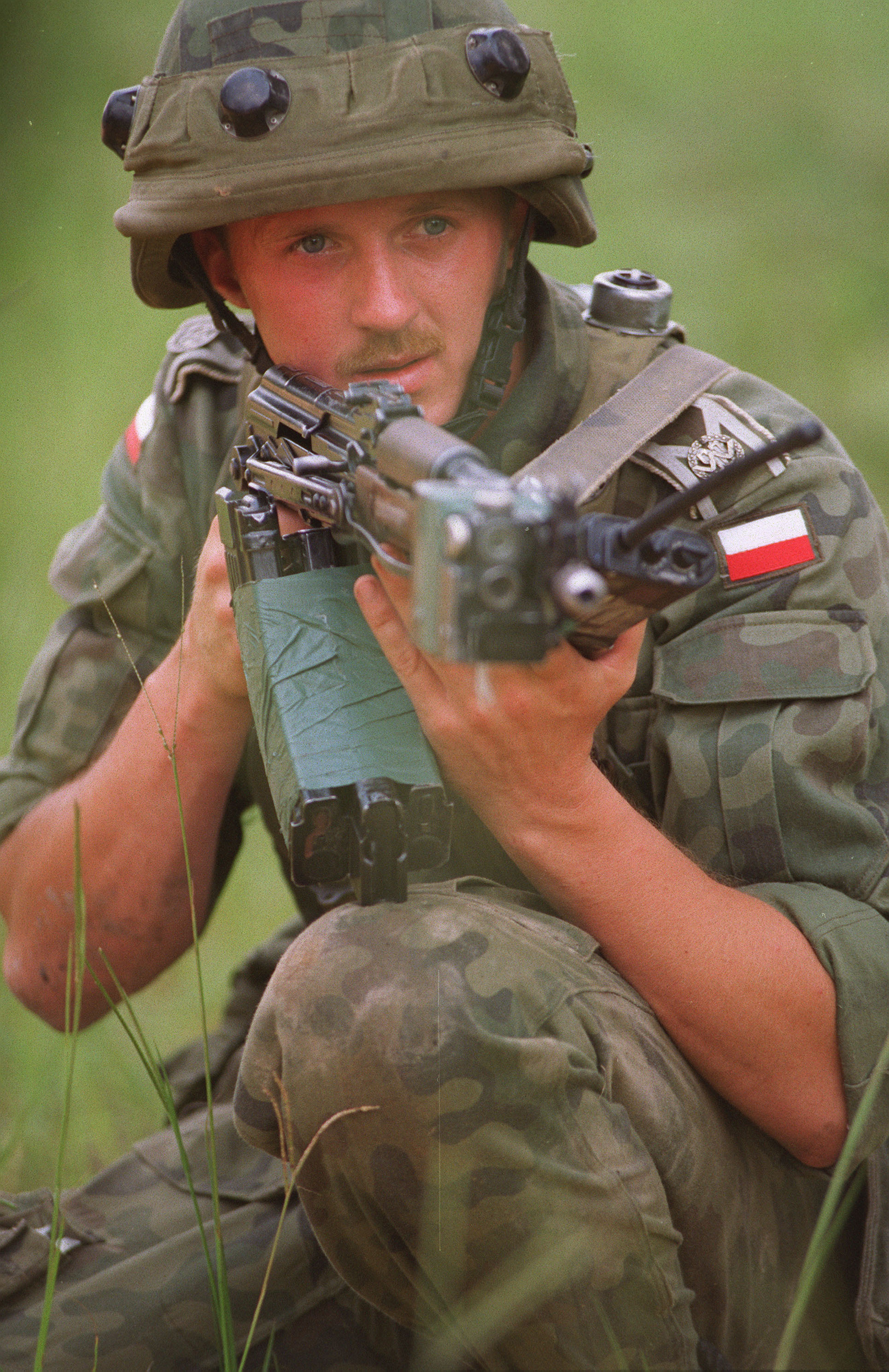
A Kbk AKMS fitted with a MILES laser training device in the hands of a Polish soldier in 1997.

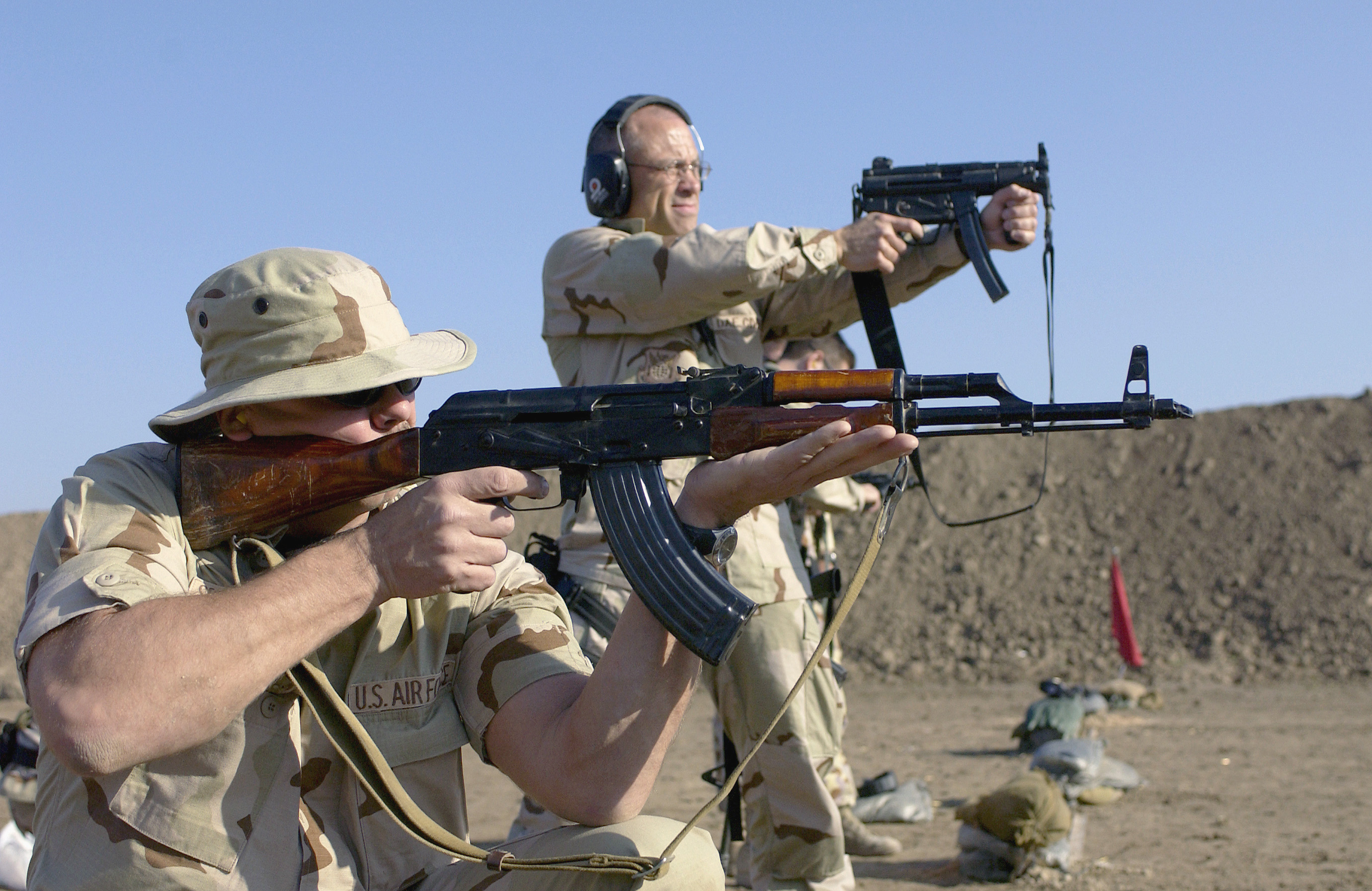
Foreground: A member of the United States Air Force field-qualifying with a USSR AKM in Iraq.

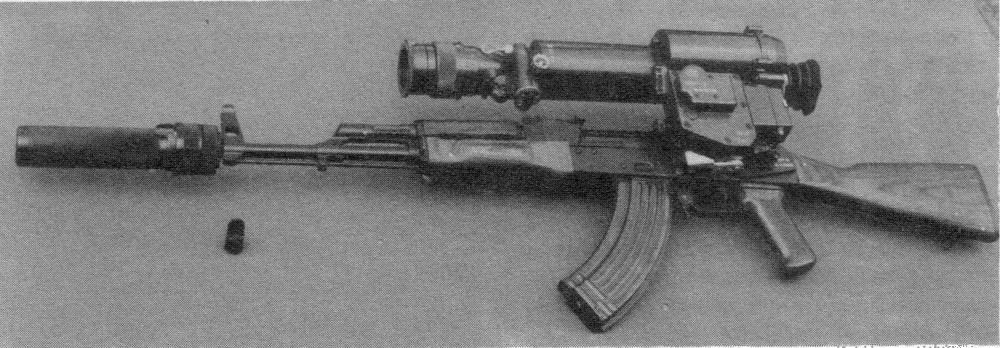
AKM with NSP-3 night sight, and PBS-1 silencer.

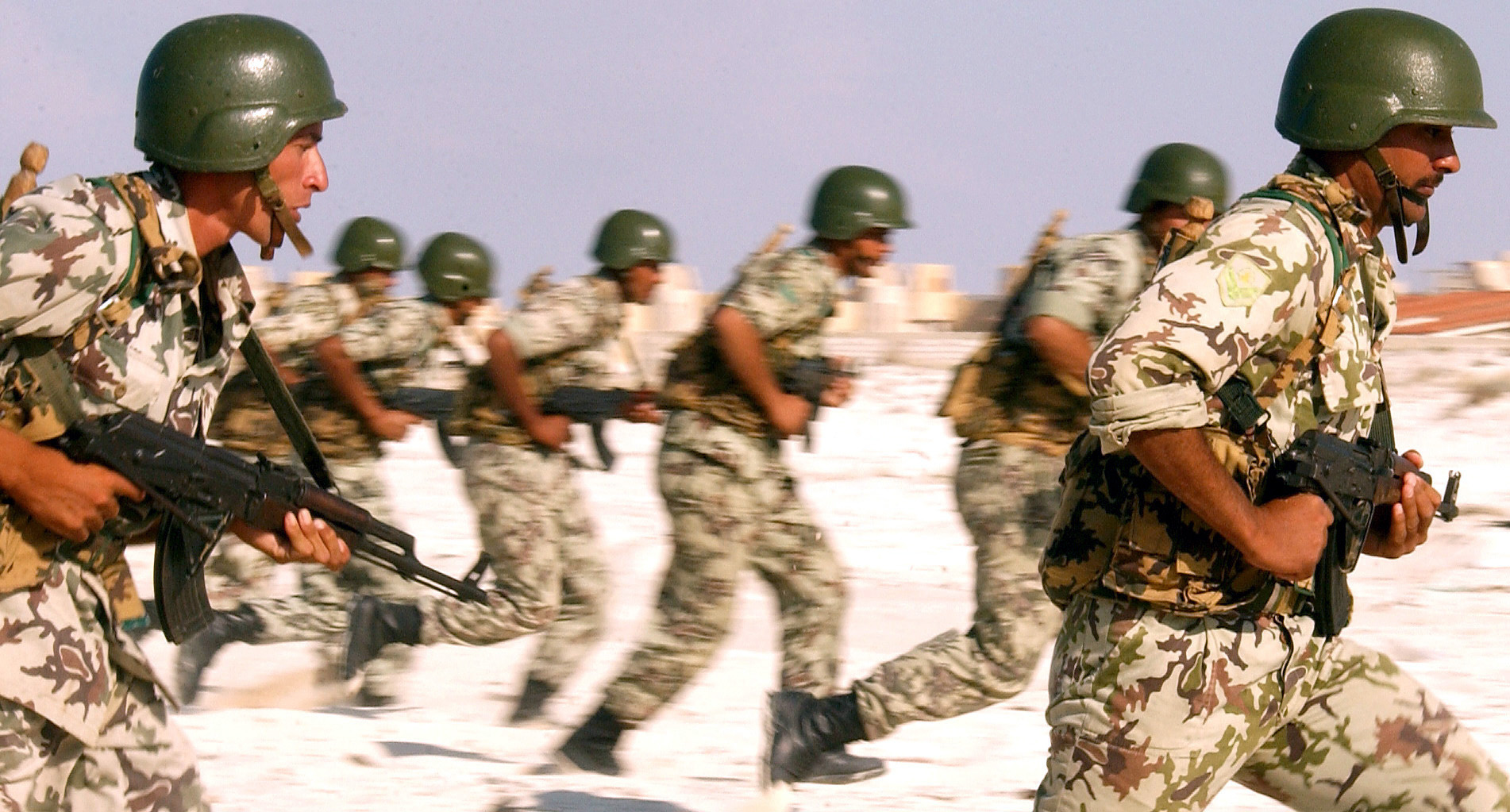
Egyptian soldiers in training with Egyptian-made Maadi.

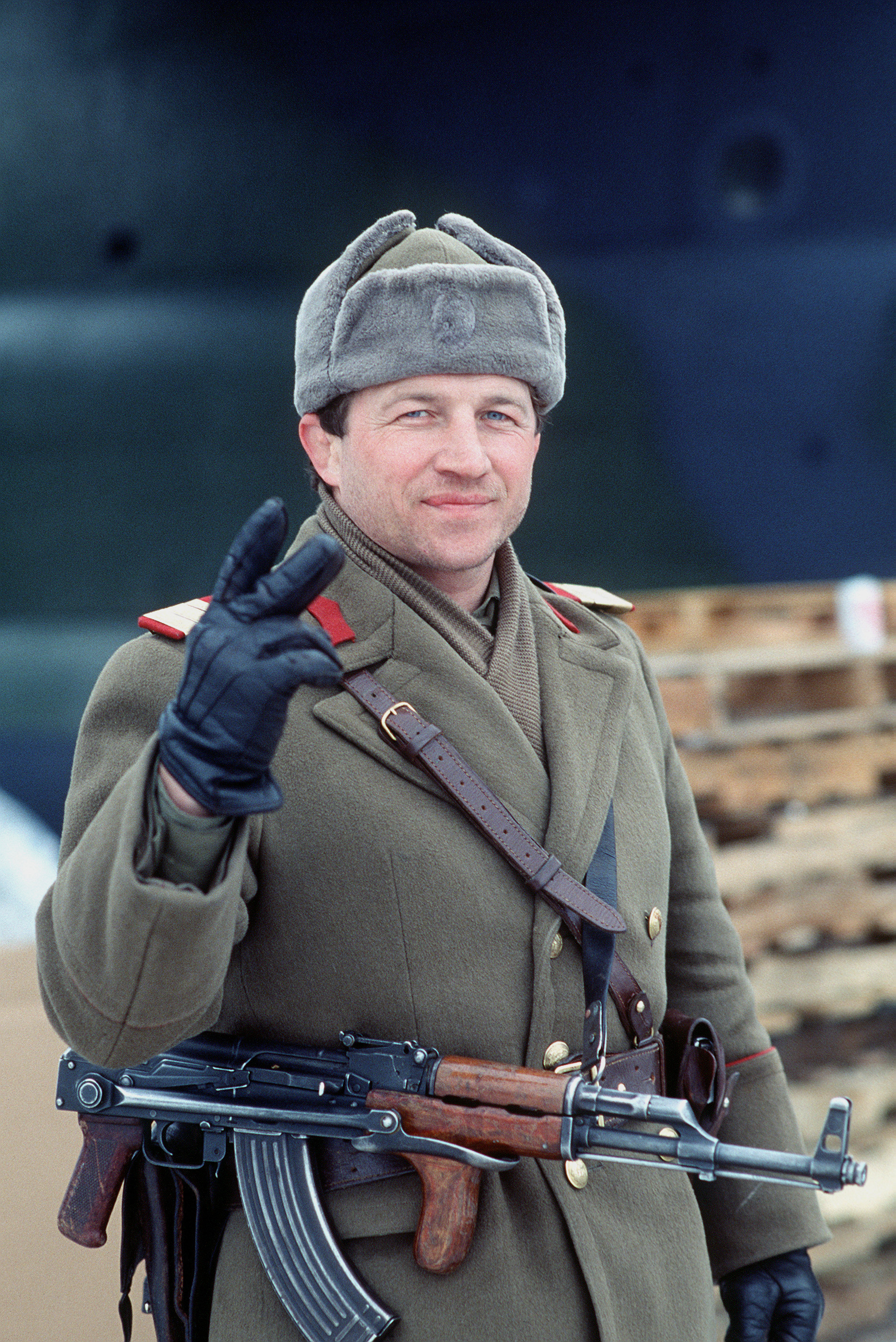
A Romanian sub-officer with a PM md. 65.

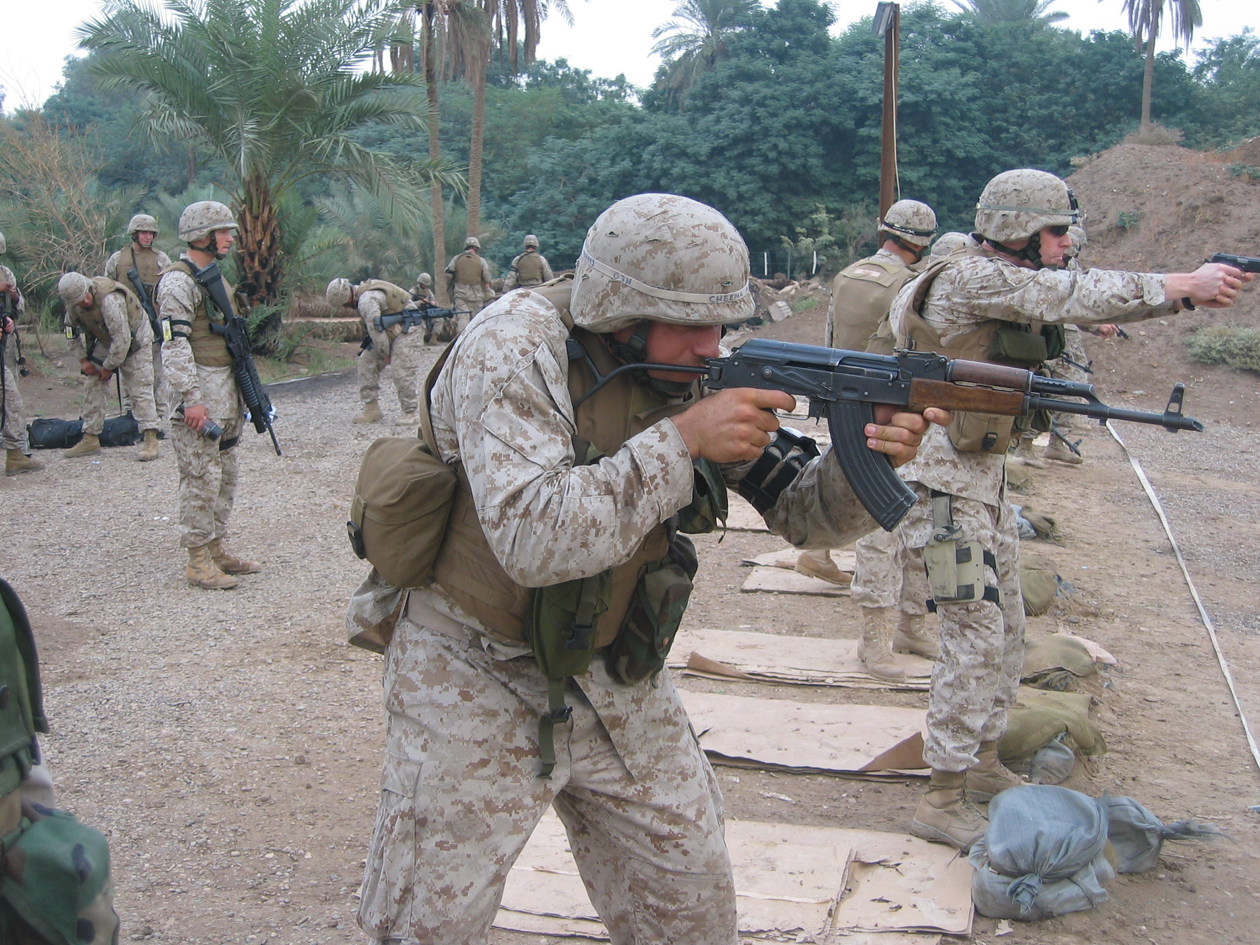
U.S. Marine firing an East German MPi-KMS-72.

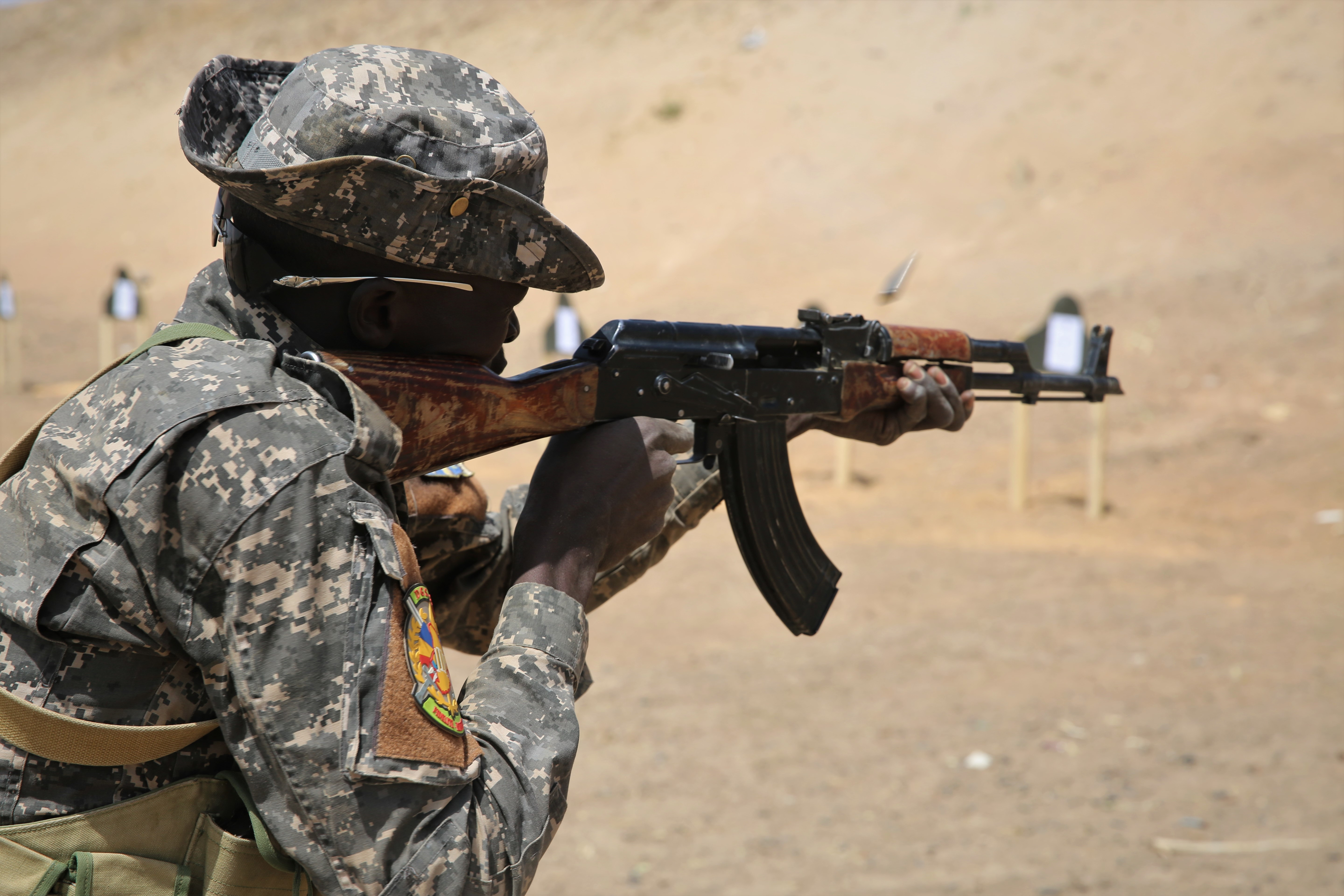
A Chadian special forces soldier firing an AKM at a live fire range.

== See also ==
- Comparison of the AK-47 and M16
- List of most-produced firearms
- Saiga semi-automatic rifle
- vz. 58
- Zastava M72
