= Dita =

Dita is a female given name, and may be an Indonesian nickname of Anandita (an Indonesian female name, from a Hinduism word, means "happy"), Dita may refer to:

== People ==
- Dita Charanzová (born 1975), Czech politician and diplomat
- Dita Jeřábková (born 1974), Czech volleyball player
- Dita Karang (born 1996), Indonesian member of the South Korean girl group Secret Number
- Dita Hopkins Kinney (1855–1921), first superintendent of the United States Army Nurse Corps
- Dita Kraus (1929–2025), Czech-Israeli teacher, writer and Auschwitz survivor
- Dita Krūmberga (born 1984), Latvian former basketball player
- Dita Parlo (1908–1971), German actress
- Dita Rozenberga (born 1992), Latvian basketball player
- Dita Indah Sari (born 1972), Indonesian trade union and socialist activist
- Dita Želvienė (born 1968), Lithuanian former swimmer and coach
- Bruno Dita (born 1993), Albanian footballer
- Constantina Diță (born 1970), Romanian Olympic marathon champion
- Nicolae Diță (born 1976), Romanian former footballer
- Dita Von Teese, stage name of American burlesque performer Heather Renée Sweet (born 1972)
- Mey Chan (born 1986), Indonesian singer known as Dita

== Arts and entertainment ==
- Dita (TV series), an Australian talk show from 1967 to 1970
- Dita Galindo, a fictional character in the FX television series Mayans M.C.
- Dita, a character in the manga and anime series Chobits

== Other uses ==
- Dita (moth), a genus of moths in the family Oecophoridae
- Dita (woreda), a district of Ethiopia
- Dita, an Ethiopian lyre-like musical instrument
- Darwin Information Typing Architecture (DITA), an XML data model for content authoring and publishing
- DITA Open Toolkit
- DITA, a variant of the Czech 152 mm SpGH DANA self-propelled gun howitzer
