= PBS-1 silencer =

Silencer for the AKM

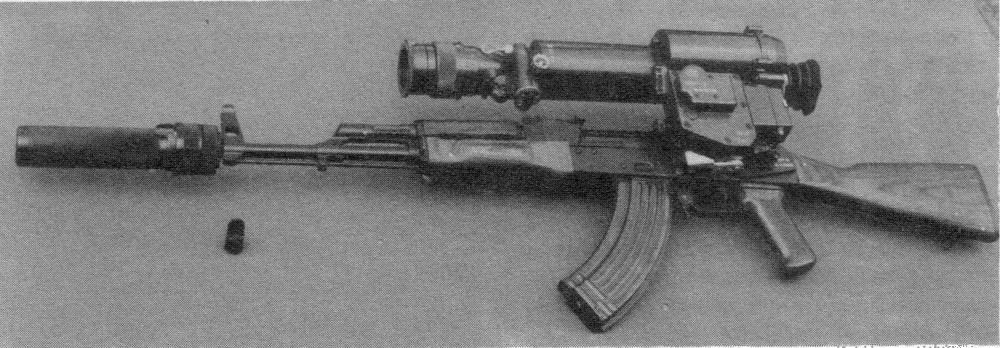
AKML assault rifle with NSP-3 night sight and PBS-1 silencer

The PBS-1 is a silencer designed for the 7.62x39mm AKM variant of the Soviet AK-47 assault rifle in the Kalashnikov rifle family. It is 40 mm (1.6 in) in diameter and 200 mm (7.9 in) long.

== History ==
The PBS-1 silencer, designed for use with the AKM to reduce the noise when firing, was introduced in the 1960s, and was used mostly by Spetsnaz forces and the KGB. They were used by the Spetsnaz in the Soviet–Afghan War in the 1980s, requiring the use of the AKM (modernized variant of the AK-47), because the newer AK-74 did not have a silencer available. Until a variant of the AK-74, the AKS-74UB adapted for use with the PBS-4 suppressor (used in combination with subsonic 5.45×39mm Russian ammunition).

The PBS-1 is a two-chambered silencer using baffles and a rubber wipe. It was designed for use in conjunction with subsonic rifle ammunition. The rubber wipe requires replacement after 20–25 rounds. With a rubber wipe in place the PBS-1 reliably reduces the sound of an AKM discharge by 15 dB, which make the noise between 130—135 dB.

== Gallery ==
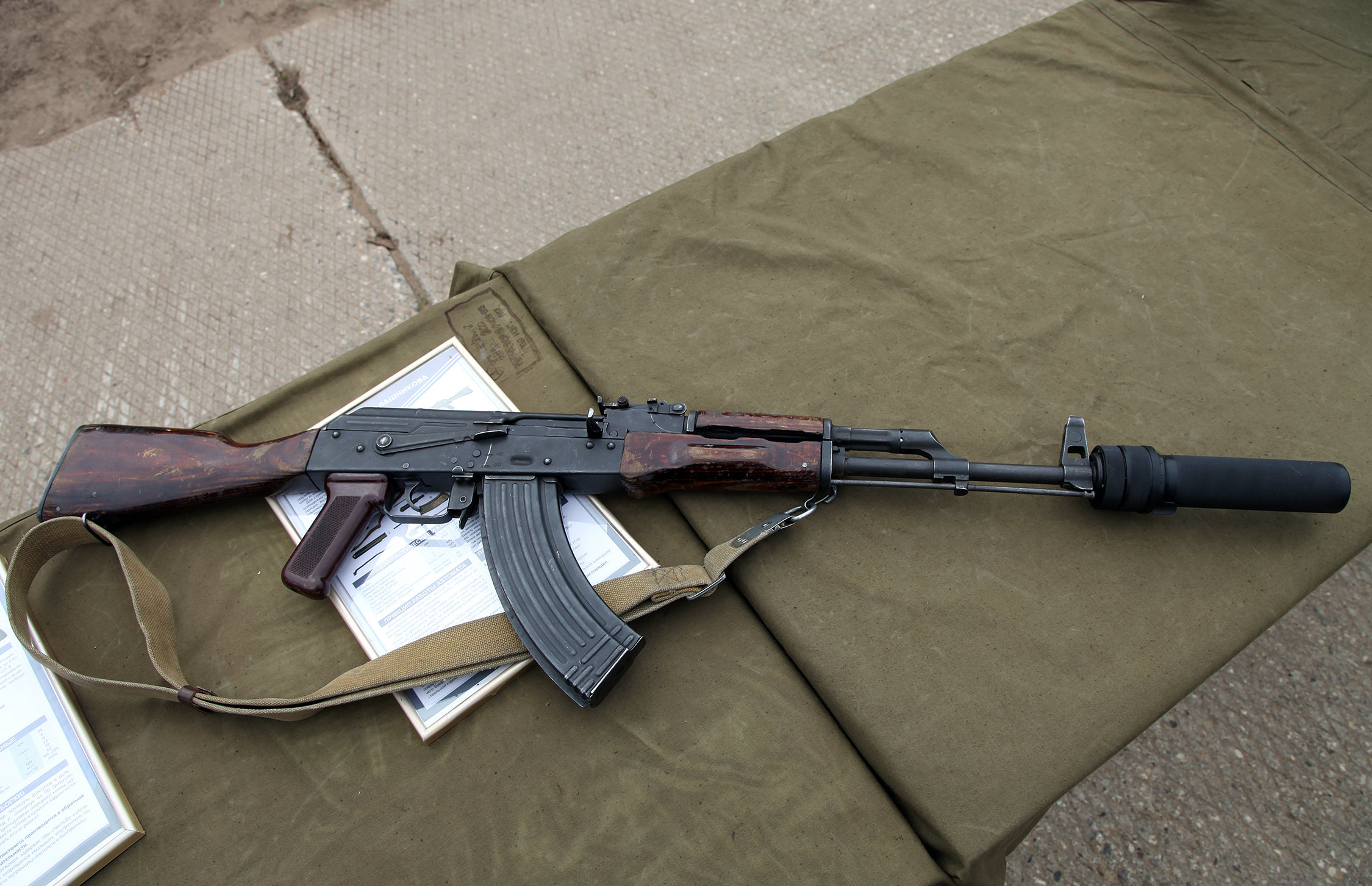
PBS-1 fitted on an AKM.

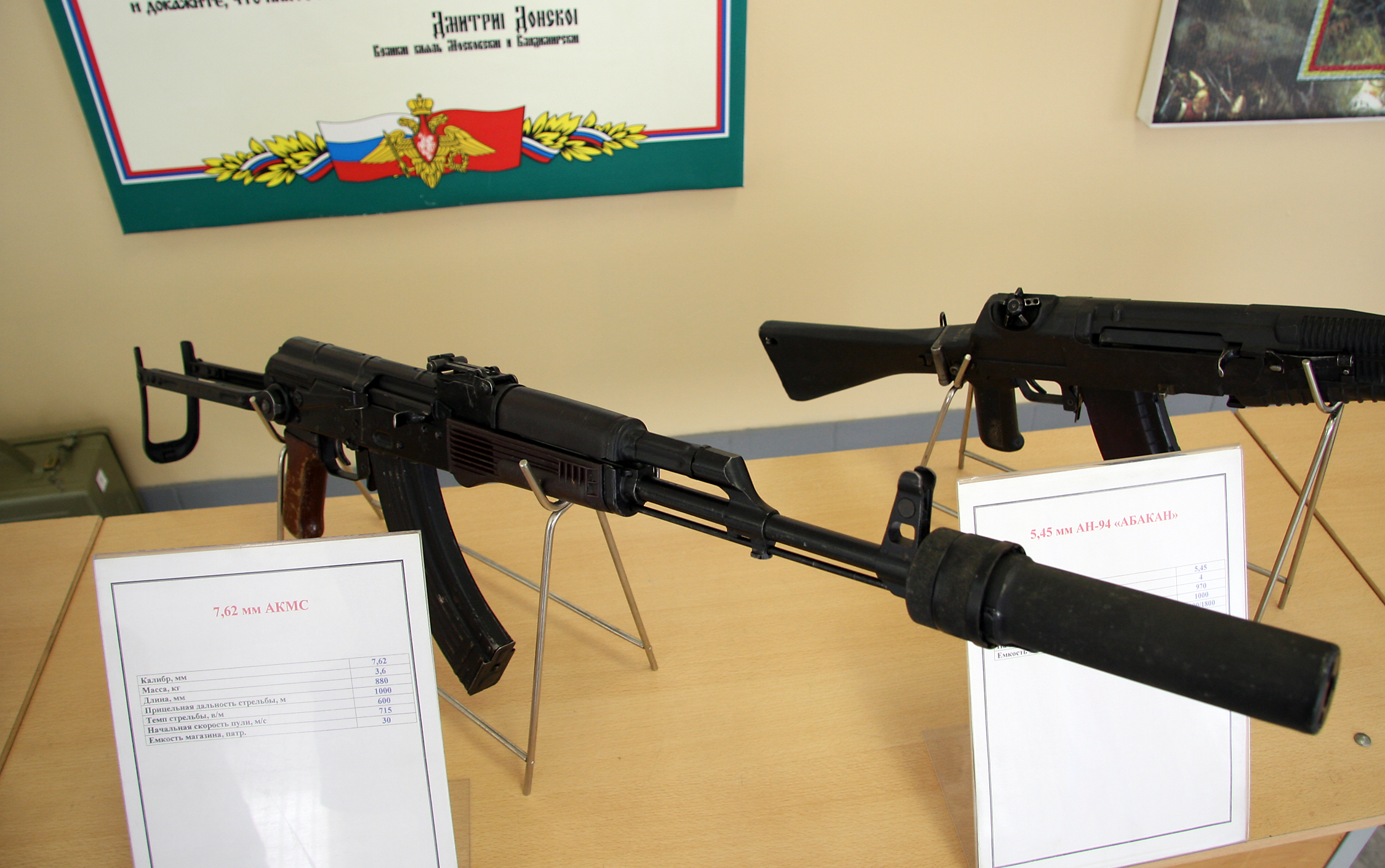
An AKMS fitted with a PBS-1.

== See also ==
- PBS-4 silencer
- AK-104
