= Fiocchi Munizioni =

Italian business

- Type: Private
- Industry: Firearms
- Founded: 3 July 1876
- Founder: Giulio Fiocchi
- Headquarters: Lecco, Italy,
- Products: Ammunition, cartridges
- Owner: Czechoslovak Group (70%)
- Website: fiocchi.com

Fiocchi Munizioni is one of Italy's largest and oldest manufacturers of ammunition. The company's headquarters and main production plant are in Via Santa Barbara in Lecco, Italy.

== History ==
Fiocchi Munizioni was founded on 3 July 1876 in Lecco, Italy, by accountant Giulio Fiocchi.

In 1876, Giulio Fiocchi took over the ammunition production part of a weapon and ammunition company already based in Lecco, which produced small-caliber ammunition.

A Fiocchi cal. 12 gauge

At that time a radical change was introduced in firearms: the newly developed breech-loader replaced the traditional muzzle loader. Fiocchi started manufacturing cases with primers suitable for reloading; in the early 1890s production was extended to complete cartridges loaded with bullets or shot. At the same time, Fiocchi gave up the production of black powder, as it was no longer profitable.

At the beginning of the 20th century, Fiocchi diversified and began making snap fasteners using scraps from cartridge production. Fiocchi Snaps was formed in 1903. It assumed an important role to counterbalance the trend of the ammunition market, but at the end of the 1980s Fiocchi made a decision to focus on ammunition as its core business, and the snaps factory was sold.

During its long life, Fiocchi has manufactured all kinds of ammunition from pinfire, shotshells, and cartridges to all kinds of cartridges and cases, both rimfire and centerfire. They manufacture rarer cartridges, for example the .455 Webley.

== Recent history ==
Fiocchi Munizioni makes small-bore ammunition and offers a wide range of products. Its presence and production sites are also in the United States and in Hungary. In 2008 Fiocchi UK was opened in the United Kingdom.

According to a recent interview with Carlo Fiocchi, the head of Fiocchi America, more than 75% of the ammunition sold by Fiocchi in the United States is also manufactured in the United States at Fiocchi America's production facility in Ozark, Missouri. Fiocchi America's composition of U.S. ammo manufacturing and sales according to the interview is as follows:

- 95% of the centre-fire rifle ammunition, which accounts for ~15% of Fiocchi's U.S. sales
- 75% of centre-fire pistol ammunition, which accounts for ~35% of Fiocchi's U.S. sales
- 100% of shotshells, which accounts for ~35% of Fiocchi's U.S. sales
- 0% of rimfire ammunition, which account for ~15% of Fiocchi's U.S. sales (along with components)

Furthermore, Fiocchi shooting cartridges have contributed to several World Cups and Olympic triumphs, as the Games in Athens in 2004 and Beijing in 2008.

In 2011 newly developed 12GA shotshells filled with chemical tracer Cyalume in which allows the shooter to see where the shots are going and help with training of sporting clays. The tracer shots are non-toxic and biodegradable and packaged in a sealed metal can in Fiocchi's line of Canned Heat ammunition. The Canned Heat line of ammunition allows a greater shelf life.

Fiocchi Munizioni was entirely owned by the Fiocchi Family, until Czechoslovak Group acquired 70% of the company in 2022.

== Fiocchi of America ==
In partnership with Smith & Wesson, the Fiocchi family had a factory in Alton, Illinois, in the 1950s. Diverging company interests caused Fiocchi to sell its share to Smith & Wesson and withdraw from the American market. Great-grandson Carlo Fiocchi joined the family business in 1980 at the age of 24 and worked as a product manager in charge of the English-speaking market. His responsibilities included overseeing its meagre exports to the United States. Carlo travelled to the United States on his honeymoon, with instructions to bring back marketing research for a US facility.

Carlo concluded that opportunities could not be exploited unless Fiocchi had a physical presence. In 1983, an FOA facility was built in Springfield, Missouri, to import ammunition, the location selected because of his father's existing contacts there and that it offered the most favourable rail and trucking costs. After a year and a half, they realized that importing loaded ammunition was not an effective business model. The company couldn't react fast enough to the needs of the US shooters. Carlo returned to Italy and convinced the president, Paolo, to build a manufacturing plant on a farm he identified in the Ozarks near Springfield. Fiocchi negotiated a purchase with the farmer and loans with the bank. Providing a platform for quality manufacturing jobs, the Fiocchi enterprise was enthusiastically welcomed by the local government.
