= Excalibur Army =

Czech defense company

- Type: Limited liability company
- Industry: Defence industry
- Founded: 1995
- Founder: Jaroslav Strnad
- Headquarters: Prague, Czech Republic
- Products: Military vehicles, artillery systems, rocket launchers
- Revenue: CZK 83.2 billion (2025)
- Operating income: 16,304,903,000 Czech koruna (2025)
- Net income: 12,477,350,000 Czech koruna (2025)
- Total assets: 48,654,921,000 Czech koruna (2025)
- Number of employees: Over 1,000 (2025)
- Parent: Czechoslovak Group
- Website: www.excaliburarmy.cz

Excalibur Army is a Czech defence company that manufactures, repairs and modernises military vehicles and artillery systems. It has production facilities in Šternberk and Přelouč and is part of the Czechoslovak Group (CSG). The company also trades in military equipment and ammunition.

Jaroslav Strnad founded Excalibur Army in 1995 to trade in surplus military equipment. The company later bought former military repair plants and began manufacturing its own equipment. It makes the DANA M2, DITA and Morana self-propelled howitzers, as well as the RM-70 Vampire multiple rocket launcher and Patriot armoured vehicles.

== History ==
=== Early years ===
Before establishing Excalibur Army in 1995, Jaroslav Strnad traded in scrap metal. His new company bought vehicles, weapons and spare parts that the Czech military no longer needed. Some equipment was repaired for resale; the rest was broken up for scrap. The company later began repairing and modernising military vehicles.

Excalibur Army bought a former military repair plant in Přelouč in 2005. In March 2013, it paid the state-owned VOP CZ CZK 152 million for the military repair works in Šternberk, where it had already been leasing part of the site.

Strnad's other defence businesses were brought together under Excalibur Group in 2014. The holding company was renamed Czechoslovak Group in 2016, with Excalibur Army remaining one of its subsidiaries.

=== Expansion after 2022 ===
Following Russia's invasion of Ukraine in February 2022, Excalibur Army increased its repair and modernisation work on military vehicles for the Ukrainian armed forces. By January 2023, Excalibur Army was modernising T-72 tanks for Ukraine at its Šternberk plant. The work was financed by the United States and the Netherlands.

Reuters visited the Šternberk factory in March 2024 and reported on the refurbishment of Soviet-designed military vehicles for Ukraine. The Netherlands had purchased 45 refurbished T-72 tanks and 100 mounted anti-aircraft guns from Excalibur Army for the Ukrainian military.

In September 2025, the company opened a new assembly hall in Šternberk. The 6,600-square-metre building cost approximately CZK 500 million, including its equipment. At the opening, Excalibur Army signed a memorandum with Germany's KNDS Deutschland concerning the maintenance and repair of Leopard 2 tanks for the Czech Army.

== Operations and products ==
Excalibur Army's main production sites are in Šternberk and Přelouč. The company repairs and modernises older military vehicles, particularly Soviet-designed tanks and infantry fighting vehicles, and manufactures artillery and other military equipment. It also supplies spare parts and maintenance services.

The company makes several self-propelled artillery systems. The DANA M2 is a modernised version of the Czechoslovak 152 mm DANA howitzer. The DITA uses a 155 mm gun and an automated loading system. Excalibur Army introduced another 155 mm howitzer, the Morana, in 2022, mounted on a Tatra 8×8 chassis.

It also makes the RM-70 Vampire, a modernised version of the Czechoslovak RM-70 multiple rocket launcher. Its vehicle range includes the Patriot family of wheeled armoured vehicles and military recovery vehicles.

== International business ==
Excalibur Army has exported military equipment to customers in Europe, Asia and Africa. Its early international business largely involved surplus and refurbished vehicles.

In 2018, Excalibur Army supplied Ukraine with refurbished BVP-1 infantry fighting vehicles and 2S1 Gvozdika self-propelled howitzers through the Polish company Wtorplast. Ukrainian reports questioned what had been paid for some of the vehicles and whether they had been properly repaired. Excalibur Army denied overpricing the equipment or carrying out inadequate repairs.

Deliveries to Ukraine grew considerably after February 2022. In 2024, the Netherlands purchased nine DITA self-propelled howitzers for Ukraine, which were delivered during the summer. A further six were ordered in October that year.

In May 2025, Radio Free Europe/Radio Liberty and its partners reported on ammunition prices under the Czech-led initiative to supply Ukraine. The journalists compared earlier offers with prices quoted by Excalibur Army and reported differences between them. CSG denied profiteering. Czech and Ukrainian government sources said the agreed commissions were lower than those suggested by critics.

Latvia chose the Morana self-propelled howitzer in September 2026. Sweden's Archer had also been considered. Later that month, Latvia and Slovakia signed an agreement with Tatra Defence Systems, another company in the Czechoslovak Group. Excalibur Army had developed the Morana together with Slovak defence-industry partners.
