= Czechoslovak Group =

Czech industrial-technological holding company

- Formerly: Excalibur Group (2014–2016)
- Type: Public
- Traded as: Euronext Amsterdam: CSG (Note: Shares in CSG N.V., the group's Netherlands-incorporated listed parent, trade on Euronext Amsterdam. Its statutory seat is Amsterdam and its management office is in Prague.)
- Industry: Defence; Automotive; Aerospace
- Founded: 1995; 31 years ago (Note: The group traces its origins to Excalibur Army, founded in 1995. The Czech holding company was established as Excalibur Group in 2014 and renamed Czechoslovak Group in 2016.)
- Founder: Jaroslav Strnad
- Headquarters: Prague, Czech Republic
- Key people: Michal Strnad (chairman and CEO)
- Revenue: ▲€6.741 billion (2025)
- Operating income: ▲€1.593 billion (2025)
- Net income: ▲€874.3 million (Note: Total consolidated profit, including profit attributable to non-controlling interests.) (2025)
- Total assets: €10.247 billion (2025)
- Total equity: €2.079 billion (2025)
- Owner: CSG FIN a.s. (84.78%; controlled by Michal Strnad)
- Number of employees: 10,689 (2025)
- Website: csg.com

Czechoslovak Group (CSG) is a Czech industrial and defence group headquartered in Prague. Its companies manufacture ammunition, military vehicles, trucks, radars and air traffic management systems. They also repair and modernise military equipment and trade in arms and ammunition. The group has manufacturing facilities in Europe, the United States and India.

The group developed from Excalibur Army, founded by Jaroslav Strnad in 1995. It adopted the Czechoslovak Group name in 2016. It then expanded through acquisitions of companies such as Fiocchi and The Kinetic Group.

Since Russia’s invasion of Ukraine in 2022, CSG has become a significant supplier of military equipment and ammunition to Ukraine, also through the Czech-led ammunition initiative.

Michal Strnad took ownership from his father in 2018 and retained control following the group’s initial public offering in January 2026. Its listed parent, CSG N.V., is incorporated in the Netherlands and trades on Euronext Amsterdam.

== History ==
=== Origins and expansion, 1995–2018 ===
Jaroslav Strnad founded Excalibur Army in 1995, having previously run a scrapyard. It began by buying and selling surplus military equipmentmade available by the downsizing of armed forces after the Cold War. The company took on repairs and refurbishment. During Jaroslav's time, the company focused on expansion of its business primarily in the Czech Republic and from 2008 also in Slovakia.

In 2013, Excalibur Army bought the military repair works at Šternberk from the state-owned company VOP CZ. In the same year, Strnad and businessman René Matera acquired majority stake in Tatra Trucks. Strnad brought his businesses together under the Excalibur Group holding company in 2014.

Jaroslav’s son Michal became chairman of the holding’s board in October 2015. Excalibur Group was renamed Czechoslovak Group in January 2016. In January 2018, Jaroslav transferred full ownership to Michal.

=== International expansion, 2019–2025 ===
CSG acquired the Spanish ammunition manufacturer Fábrica de Municiones de Granada in 2020. In 2022, it bought a 70% interest in Fiocchi, an Italian ammunition producer with manufacturing operations in Italy, the United States and the United Kingdom.

Following Russia’s invasion of Ukraine in 2022, CSG expanded its supplies of military equipment and ammunition to the country. Excalibur Army participated in a programme to refurbish and modernise 90 T-72 tanks, financed jointly by the United States and the Netherlands and coordinated by the Czech Ministry of Defence.

CSG also participated in the Czech-led ammunition initiative launched in 2024, supplying ammunition manufactured by its businesses and ammunition obtained from other producers. Its reported revenue from supplies to Ukraine increased from approximately €400 million in 2023 to €1.7 billion in 2024.

In December 2023, CSG acquired an 80% interest in the Italian sporting and hunting shotgun manufacturer Armi Perazzi. Mauro and Roberta Perazzi, the founder’s children, retained the remaining 20%.

CSG announced its agreement to buy Vista Outdoor’s ammunition business, The Kinetic Group, in October 2023. US politicians, including JD Vance, opposed the sale. It received clearance from the Committee on Foreign Investment in the United States in June 2024. Vista Outdoor’s shareholders voted in favour that November, and the sale closed on 27 November 2024. The business included the Federal, Remington Ammunition, CCI, Speer and HEVI-Shot brands.

CSG acquired the remaining shares in Fiocchi in April 2025. The following month, it bought the Walsrode industrial park and nitrocellulose plant in Germany, with plans to adapt the plant to produce energetic-grade nitrocellulose for ammunition.

=== Stock-market listing ===
On 23 January 2026, shares in CSG N.V. began trading on Euronext Amsterdam. The Netherlands-incorporated company became the group’s listed parent. The offering valued CSG at €25 billion and was the largest defence initial public offering recorded, according to Euronext.

The IPO raised €3.8 billion from the sale of approximately 15.2% of CSG’s shares, including the over-allotment option. CSG received €750 million from issuing new shares. The rest went to CSG FIN, which sold part of its existing holding. Michal Strnad retained control through CSG FIN.

In May 2026, Hunterbrook Media published a report questioning CSG’s business model, ammunition-production capacity and disclosures. Its affiliated investment fund, Hunterbrook Capital, disclosed a short position in CSG shares. CSG disputed the report’s findings and said its prospectus and later disclosures were accurate.

== Operations ==
=== Ammunition and firearms ===
CSG makes ammunition for armed forces, police, hunters and sport shooters. Fiocchi and The Kinetic Group produce small-calibre ammunition, sold under brands including Federal, Remington Ammunition, CCI, Speer and HEVI-Shot. Armi Perazzi makes sporting and hunting shotguns.

MSM Group and its businesses ZVS Holding, VOP Nováky and FM Granada, produce artillery and tank ammunition and components. They also refurbish older ammunition and dispose of unusable stocks. ZVI specialises in medium-calibre ammunition.

CSG is also expanding its production of materials used in ammunition. Its Walsrode plant in Germany makes industrial-grade nitrocellulose and is being adapted to produce energetic-grade nitrocellulose by the end of 2027. In Greece, Hellenic Ammunition produces 155 mm ammunition at Lavrio, where TNT production is scheduled to resume by the end of 2027.

=== Land systems ===
Excalibur Army builds, repairs and modernises military vehicles and artillery. Its range includes tanks, infantry fighting vehicles, self-propelled howitzers, rocket launchers and engineering vehicles. In 2015, the company secured a contract to supply approximately 100 refurbished tanks and infantry fighting vehicles to Iraq for use against the Islamic State.

Tatra Trucks makes heavy trucks for military and civilian customers. It also supplies chassis for armoured vehicles, artillery and other specialised equipment.

Tatra Defence produces armoured vehicles, including the Pandur II through its partnership with General Dynamics European Land Systems and the Titus with KNDS France and Tatra Trucks. In December 2025, KNDS Deutschland contracted the company to make 150 Leopard 2A8 tank hulls, with an option for another 300. Tatra Defence is responsible for welding the hulls, production processes and quality control.

- CFL-120 Karpat medium tank

=== Aerospace and defence electronics ===
ELDIS Pardubice makes radars, while RETIA develops radars, surveillance equipment and command-and-control systems. RETIA worked with Israel Aerospace Industries and the Czech Military Technical Institute on mobile air-defence radars for the Czech armed forces. CS SOFT and ATRAK develop air-traffic-management software and systems.

Several group companies contribute to Trident, an air-defence system presented at Eurosatory in June 2026. Excalibur International acts as the main systems integrator, RETIA supplies radars and command-and-control equipment, and Tatra companies provide chassis, armoured cabins and launcher structures. Roketsan supplies the surface-to-air missiles.

European Air Services and the Slovak Training Academy in Košice have trained helicopter pilots and ground crews for CSG. Afghan pilots started courses at the academy in 2018 as their air force began using UH-60 Black Hawks.

AviaNera Technologies and its Serbian subsidiary MUST Solutions develop turbojet and turbofan engines for unmanned aircraft. AviaNera began work on a technology centre in the Czech Republic in 2026, where it plans to develop the processes needed to manufacture the engines.

== Supplies to Ukraine ==
Excalibur Army supplied military equipment to Ukraine before Russia’s invasion. In 2018, it arranged deliveries of refurbished BVP-1 infantry fighting vehicles and 2S1 Gvozdika self-propelled howitzers through the Polish company Wtorplast.

After the invasion, deliveries included modernised T-72 tanks, infantry fighting vehicles, artillery and rocket launchers. Among the tanks was the T-72 Avenger, a version modernised by Excalibur Army. A Czech crowdfunding campaign paid for one of these tanks, named Tomáš, which was sent to Ukraine in October 2022.

Ukrainian forces were using Excalibur Army’s RM-70 Vampire rocket launchers by 2022. Footage of BM-21 MT Striga launchers in combat appeared in 2023. Excalibur Army also delivered DANA M2 self-propelled howitzers to Ukraine.

In 2024, the Netherlands ordered nine DITA self-propelled howitzers from Excalibur Army for Ukraine. These were delivered that summer, and the Netherlands announced an order for another six in October.

Tatra chassis have been used for versions of Ukraine’s Bohdana self-propelled howitzer, the Bureviy rocket launcher and vehicles carrying the Neptune coastal-defence missile system.

CSG supplies ammunition to Ukraine through the Czech-led ammunition initiative and other arrangements. The group has also licensed ammunition production to Ukrainian Armor, providing technical documentation, know-how and components.

== Notable holdings ==
The Czechoslovak Group holds shares in around 100 companies based mainly in the Czech Republic and Slovakia. Selected holdings are listed below.

Company or group	Country	Main activities	Ownership and notes
Land systems and vehicles
Excalibur Army	Czech Republic	Manufacture, repair and modernisation of military vehicles and artillery systems	
KARBOX	Czech Republic	Specialised containers and vehicle bodies	
Tatra Defence	Czech Republic	Development and manufacture of wheeled armoured vehicles	Separate company from Tatra Trucks.
Tatra Trucks	Czech Republic	Heavy trucks and chassis for military and civilian use	CSG holds 65%; accounted for as a joint venture because certain essential decisions require 75% shareholder approval.
Rába	Hungary	Vehicle and automotive-component manufacturing	CSG Defence acquired a 36.55% indirect interest through its 49% holding in 4iG SDT EGY in September 2026.
Firearms, ammunition and energetics
14. oktobar	Serbia	Ammunition components, heavy machinery and railway components	Products include projectile bodies and mortar-ammunition stabilisers.
Armi Perazzi	Italy	Sporting and hunting shotguns	CSG acquired 80% in December 2023; Mauro and Roberta Perazzi hold the remaining 20%.
Fiocchi	Italy	Small-calibre ammunition for hunting, sport shooting and security forces	Wholly owned since April 2025. Includes Fiocchi of America, Baschieri & Pellagri and Lyalvale Express.
Hellenic Ammunition	Greece	Large-calibre ammunition	Joint venture with Hellenic Defence Systems at Lavrio. The site produces 155 mm ammunition; TNT production is planned for the end of 2027.
The Kinetic Group	United States	Small-calibre ammunition	Acquired from Vista Outdoor in November 2024. Brands include Federal, Remington Ammunition, CCI, Speer and HEVI-Shot.
MSM Group	Slovakia	Production, refurbishment and disposal of ammunition; defence engineering	Its portfolio includes ZVS Holding, VOP Nováky, Vývoj Martin and Spain's FM Granada.
MSM North America	United States	Ammunition-production technology and facilities	Awarded a US Army contract in 2025 to design, build and commission the Future Artillery Complex at the Iowa Army Ammunition Plant.
MSM Walsrode	Germany	Nitrocellulose production	Acquired in 2025. Conversion to energetic-grade production is scheduled for completion by the end of 2027.
ZVI	Czech Republic	Medium-calibre ammunition	CSG acquired a majority interest in 2025.
Aerospace and technology
ATRAK	Czech Republic	Air-traffic-control systems	
AviaNera Technologies	Czech Republic	Propulsion systems and other technologies for unmanned aircraft	Holds a 51% interest in Serbia's MUST Solutions, acquired in 2025.
CS SOFT	Czech Republic	Air-traffic-management software and training systems	
ELDIS Pardubice	Czech Republic	Radar development and manufacturing	
MDA Space	Canada	Space technology and services	CSG announced the acquisition of a 9.5% minority interest in October 2026.
RETIA	Czech Republic	Radars, command-and-control systems and defence electronics	

=== Former holdings ===
Company	Main activities	Disposal date	Buyer or successor owner
Job Air Technic	Aircraft maintenance, repair and overhaul	February 2026	Acquired by FL Technics, part of Avia Solutions Group. The sale was announced in 2025 and completed on 12 February 2026.
DAKO-CZ	Braking systems for railway vehicles	September 2025	Transferred to YTARA, a separate group owned by Michal Strnad, on 30 September 2025.
Elton hodinářská	Manufacture of Prim watches	June 2025	CSG's interest was acquired by MPM-Quality, owned by Petr Hanko.
