= Dita phococara =

Scientific classification
- Kingdom: Animalia
- Phylum: Arthropoda
- Class: Insecta
- Order: Lepidoptera
- Family: Oecophoridae
- Genus: Dita
- Species: D. phococara

Binomial name
- Dita phococara J. F. G. Clarke, 1978

Species of moth

Dita phococara is a moth in the family Oecophoridae. It was described by John Frederick Gates Clarke in 1978. It is found in Chile.

The wingspan is about 20 mm. The forewings are buckthorn brown with the costa, from the base to the apical fifth, cinnamon brown. From the apical fifth of the costa a transverse cinnamon-brown shade extends to the dorsum, where it is broadest. In the center of the cell, there is a small cinnamon-brown spot and at the end of the cell a sordid white dot. The hindwings are greyish fuscous.
