= Nicolae Diță =

Romanian footballer

Personal information
- Date of birth: 11 October 1976 (age 50)
- Place of birth: Pitești, Romania
- Height: 1.80 m (5 ft 11 in)
- Position: Center back

Senior career*
Years	Team	Apps	(Gls)
1993–1994	Argeș Pitești	2	(0)
1995–1996	Dacia Pitești	9	(0)
1996–2003	Argeș Pitești	157	(6)
2003–2004	Dacia Mioveni	11	(1)
2004–2005	CS Otopeni	21	(2)
2005–2006	Juventus București	11	(1)
2006–2008	Prefabricate Modelu	40	(2)
2008–2010	Argeș Pitești	11	(0)
2010–2011	CSM Râmnicu Vâlcea	7	(0)
2011–2012	Atletic Bradu		
2012–2013	SCM Argeșul Pitești		
2014	Atletic Bradu		
Total		269	(12)
- * Club domestic league appearances and goals

Nicolae Diță (born 11 October 1976) is a Romanian former football defender.

== Honours ==
Argeș Pitești

- Divizia B: 1993–94
