= Dita (moth) =

Scientific classification
- Kingdom: Animalia
- Phylum: Arthropoda
- Class: Insecta
- Order: Lepidoptera
- Family: Oecophoridae
- Subfamily: Oecophorinae
- Genus: Dita; Clarke, 1978

Genus of moths

Dita is a genus of moths in the family Oecophoridae.

== Species ==
- Dita fasciatipedella (Zeller, 1874)
- Dita morani Urra, 2012
- Dita palmai Urra, 2012
- Dita phococara Clarke, 1978
