= Cătălin Munteanu =

Romanian footballer (born 1979)

Personal information
- Full name: Cătălin Constantin Munteanu
- Date of birth: 26 January 1979 (age 47)
- Place of birth: Bucharest, Romania
- Height: 1.72 m (5 ft 8 in)
- Position: Central midfielder

Youth career
- 1989–1993: Romprim București
- 1993–1996: Steaua București

Senior career*
Years	Team	Apps	(Gls)
1996–1998	Steaua București	45	(22)
1998–2001	Salamanca	94	(20)
2001–2004	Atlético Madrid	0	(0)
2001–2002	→ Espanyol (loan)	12	(1)
2002–2004	→ Albacete (loan)	35	(1)
2004–2005	Murcia	22	(1)
2006–2008	Dinamo București	72	(5)
2008–2010	FC Brașov	62	(3)
2010–2014	Dinamo București	84	(7)
2014	FC Brașov	14	(0)
2015	Viitorul Constanța	3	(0)
Total		443	(60)

International career
1996–2000	Romania U21	11	(0)
1997–2001	Romania	17	(1)

Managerial career
- 2017–2018: Romania U19 (assistant)
- 2018–2019: Astra Giurgiu (assistant)
- 2019: Hermannstadt (assistant)
- 2019–2020: Petrolul Ploiești (assistant)
- 2020: Petrolul Ploiești (caretaker)
- 2020–2021: Universitatea Cluj (assistant)
- 2021–2022: Politehnica Iași (assistant)
- 2022–2023: Voluntari (assistant)
- 2023: Sepsi OSK (video analyst)
- 2024–2025: Botoșani (assistant)
- 2025: Petrolul Ploiești (assistant)
- * Club domestic league appearances and goals

Cătălin Constantin Munteanu (born 26 January 1979) is a Romanian former professional footballer who played as a central midfielder.

== Club career ==
=== Steaua București ===
Munteanu, nicknamed "Cap de Zmeu" (Head of Zmeu), was born on 26 January 1979 in Bucharest, Romania. He began playing senior-football at Steaua București, making his Divizia A debut under coach Dumitru Dumitriu on 16 March 1997 in a 3–1 victory against Rapid București. In his first season at the club, Munteanu helped the team win The Double with 12 league appearances and five goals, and Dumitriu also sent him in the 84th minute to replace Sabin Ilie in the 4–2 victory against Național București in the Cupa României final. In the following season he helped Steaua win another title, this time under the guidance of coach Mihai Stoichiță, being the team's top-scorer with 17 goals in 33 matches, including one goal in a 3–1 win over rivals Dinamo București. Munteanu also started to play in European competitions, in his debut, scoring one goal in the first leg of the 5–3 aggregate victory against CSKA Sofia in the 1997–98 Champions League first qualifying round. Then he scored two goals that helped the team get past Bastia on the away goals rule after the 3–3 on aggregate in the second round of the 1997–98 UEFA Cup.

=== Career in Spain ===
Salamanca paid €3.6 million for Munteanu's transfer from Steaua in 1998. He made his La Liga debut on 30 August under coach Miguel Ángel Russo in a 0–0 draw against Mallorca. He scored his first goal in the competition in a 2–1 home loss to Real Zaragoza. The team was relegated at the end of his first season, but Munteanu stayed with the club in the second league until 2001. Throughout this period he was teammates with fellow Romanians Bogdan Stelea and Lucian Marinescu, and the team was then nicknamed "Salamanca Rumana", because Ovidiu Stîngă and Gabriel Popescu also played for the club around that period. Munteanu was bought by Atlético Madrid, but did not play a single game there. Instead he was loaned for one season at Espanyol Barcelona in La Liga. Subsequently, he was loaned to Albacete for two seasons, and in the first of those, he helped the club get promoted from the second division to the first. Afterwards he joined Real Murcia in the Segunda División where he suffered a knee injury that kept him off the field for six months.

=== Dinamo, Brașov and Viitorul ===
Munteanu went back to Romania in the middle of the 2005–06 season, and signed with Dinamo București. In the following season under coach Mircea Rednic he scored four goals in 32 appearances, including opening the score with a spectacular 27-meter shot in a 4–2 victory in a derby against Steaua, helping the team win the title. He also appeared in 12 matches in which he netted three goals, including one in the 3–1 loss on aggregate against Benfica as the club reached the round of 32 in the 2006–07 UEFA Cup. Afterwards, Dinamo aimed to reach the Champions League group stage, with Munteanu playing in the second leg of the third qualifying round against Lazio Roma, which was eventually lost with 4–2 on aggregate. In 2008, he left Dinamo to join FC Brașov for two seasons, before returning to The Red Dogs for a second four-season spell. Munteanu helped Dinamo win the 2011–12 Cupa României, brought on by coach Dario Bonetti in the 71st minute to replace Ionel Dănciulescu in the 1–0 victory in the final against Rapid București. Afterwards, Bonetti used him the entire match in the victory at the penalty shoot-out against CFR Cluj in the 2012 Supercupa României where Munteanu netted his spot kick. In 2014 he left Dinamo, ending his career by playing another half a year at FC Brașov and six months for Viitorul Constanța where on 15 March 2015 he made his last Liga I appearance in a 2–1 away victory against CFR Cluj. Munteanu accumulated 56 matches with four goals in La Liga, 107 matches and 19 goals in Segunda División and 280 appearances with 37 goals in Liga I.

== International career ==
Munteanu was part of Romania's under-21 side that managed a first-ever qualification to a European Championship in 1998, which Romania subsequently hosted. In the final tournament that was composed of eight teams, coach Victor Pițurcă used him in all three games which were losses to Netherlands, Germany and Russia, as they finished in last place.

Munteanu played 17 matches and scored one goal for Romania, making his debut on 19 November 1997, when coach Anghel Iordănescu sent him at half-time to replace Viorel Moldovan in a 1–1 friendly draw against Spain played at Lluís Sitjar Stadium in Palma de Mallorca. He made four appearances and scored one goal in the successful Euro 2000 qualifiers, though he was not part of the squad that went to the final tournament. Munteanu played five games during the 2002 World Cup qualifiers, including his last appearance for the national team which took place on 2 June 2001 in a 2–0 victory against rivals Hungary.

== Career statistics ==
=== Club ===
Appearances and goals by club, season and competition
Club	Season	League			National cup (Note: Includes Cupa României, Copa del Rey)		Europe		Other		Total	
Club	Season	Division	Apps	Goals	Apps	Goals	Apps	Goals	Apps	Goals	Apps	Goals
Steaua București	1996–97	Divizia A	12	5	4	0	0	0	—		16	5
Steaua București	1997–98	Divizia A	33	17	3	2	10 (Note: Four appearances and one goal in UEFA Champions League, six appearances and two goals in UEFA Cup)	3	—		46	21
Steaua București	Total		45	22	7	2	10	3	—		62	26
Salamanca	1998–99	La Liga	27	3	2	0	—		—		29	3
Salamanca	1999–00	Segunda División	35	7	0	0	—		—		35	7
Salamanca	2000–01	Segunda División	32	10	0	0	—		—		32	10
Salamanca	Total		94	20	2	0	—		—		96	20
Espanyol (loan)	2001–02	La Liga	12	1	1	0	—		—		13	1
Albacete (loan)	2002–03	Segunda División	18	1	1	0	—		—		19	1
Albacete (loan)	2003–04	La Liga	17	0	1	0	—		—		18	0
Albacete (loan)	Total		35	1	2	0	—		—		37	1
Murcia	2004–05	Segunda División	22	1	1	1	—		—		23	2
Dinamo București	2005–06	Divizia A	10	0	—		—		—		10	0
Dinamo București	2006–07	Liga I	32	4	1	0	12 (Note: Appearances in UEFA Cup)	3	—		45	7
Dinamo București	2007–08	Liga I	30	1	2	0	3 (Note: One appearance in UEFA Champions League, two appearances in UEFA Cup)	0	0	0	35	1
Dinamo București	Total		72	5	3	0	15	3	0	0	90	8
FC Brașov	2008–09	Liga I	31	1	1	0	—		—		32	1
FC Brașov	2009–10	Liga I	31	2	5	1	—		—		36	3
FC Brașov	Total		62	3	6	1	—		—		68	4
Dinamo București	2010–11	Liga I	30	5	4	1	4 (Note: Appearances in UEFA Europa League)	1	—		38	7
Dinamo București	2011–12	Liga I	25	2	5	0	4	1	—		34	3
Dinamo București	2012–13	Liga I	23	0	2	0	2	0	1 (Note: Appearance in Supercupa României)	0	28	0
Dinamo București	2013–14	Liga I	6	0	1	0	—		—		7	0
Dinamo București	Total		84	7	12	1	10	2	1	0	107	10
FC Brașov	2014–15	Liga I	14	0	1	0	—		1 (Note: Appearance in Cupa Ligii)	0	16	0
Viitorul Constanța	2014–15	Liga I	3	0	0	0	—		—		3	0
Career total			443	60	35	5	35	8	2	0	515	72

=== International ===
Appearances and goals by national team and year
National team	Year	Apps	Goals
Romania
Romania	1997	1	0
Romania	1998	5	1
Romania	1999	2	0
Romania	2000	4	0
Romania	2001	5	0
Total		17	1

Scores and results list Romania's goal tally first, score column indicates score after each Munteanu goal.

List of international goals scored by Cătălin Munteanu
No.	Date	Venue	Cap	Opponent	Score	Result	Competition
1	2 September 1998	Stadionul Steaua, Bucharest, Romania	3	Liechtenstein	2–0	7–0	Euro 2000 qualifiers

== Honours ==
Steaua București

- Divizia A: 1996–97, 1997–98
- Cupa României: 1996–97

Dinamo București

- Liga I: 2006–07
- Cupa României: 2011–12
- Supercupa României: 2012
