= 2005–06 FC Dinamo București season =

FC Dinamo București
2005–06 season
- Manager: Ioan Andone (rounds 1-15), Esteban Vigo (winter break), Marin Ion (rounds 16-19), Florin Marin (rounds 20-30)
- Liga I: 3rd
- Romanian Cup: Last 16
- UEFA Cup: Group phase
- Top goalscorer: Claudiu Niculescu (12 goals)

The 2005-06 season was FC Dinamo București's 57th season in Liga I. The season started well, with the highlight in recent times for the club. In UEFA Cup, Dinamo thrashed Premier League team Everton 5–1. Dinamo went on to win the tie 5–2. The crisis started in the second part of the season. Manager Ioan Andone was fired by the new Executive President of the club Ioan Becali. Esteban Vigo was brought in, but because of the scandals inside the club Ioan Becali was kicked out and Vigo left the club as well. Dinamo counted on Ion Marin for the first games of the spring that started with a 3–0 loss to Oţelul Galaţi. Florin Marin came and was kept manager for the rest of the season before Mircea Rednic took the job. Dinamo finished the season with a 0–0 draw against Poli Timișoara and finished 3rd to earn a very important UEFA Cup spot at the end of a horrible season.

Also in the 2005–06 season, in the UEFA Cup group phase, Dinamo managed to beat CSKA Moscow (Cup Holders) 1-0 but they missed the European Spring due to a couple of close games lost in the last few seconds. Playing against Olympique de Marseille on Stade Vélodrome and trailing by 2–1 in the last moments of the game Octavian Chihaia launched a ball over Barthez and scored for 2–2 but the referee whistled the end of the game while the ball was in the air and before it entered the goal. Some claim that might have been a unique moment in the history of the European Cup Football.

== Results ==
Divizia A
Round	Date	Opponent	Stadium	Result
1	7 August 2005	Oțelul Galați	A	4–1
2	14 August 2005	Pandurii Târgu Jiu	H	3–0
3	21 August 2005	Farul Constanța	H	0–1
4	28 August 2005	Politehnica Iași	A	2–0
5	11 September 2005	FCM Bacău	H	6–0
6	18 September 2005	Steaua București	A	2–2
7	25 September 2005	Rapid București	H	5–2
8	2 October 2005	Gloria Bistriţa	A	2–1
9	15 October 2005	CFR Cluj	H	5–0
10	23 October 2005	Sportul Studenţesc	A	2–0
11	29 October 2005	Jiul Petroşani	H	1–1
12	6 November 2005	FC Vaslui	A	2–1
13	19 November 2005	FC Argeş	H	1–2
14	27 November 2005	FC Naţional	A	0–2
15	4 December 2005	Politehnica Timișoara	H	1–0
16	11 March 2006	Oţelul Galaţi	H	0–3
17	18 March 2006	Pandurii Târgu Jiu	A	2–0
18	25 March 2006	Farul Constanţa	A	1–0
19	1 April 2006	Politehnica Iaşi	H	1–1
20	5 April 2006	FCM Bacău	A	1–0
21	9 April 2006	Steaua București	H	1–1
22	12 April 2006	Rapid București	A	0–3
23	15 April 2006	Gloria Bistriţa	H	3–1
24	22 April 2006	CFR Cluj	A	0–1
25	29 April 2006	Sportul Studenţesc	H	4–5
26	6 May 2006	Jiul Petroşani	A	3–1
27	13 May 2006	FC Vaslui	H	1–2
28	20 May 2006	FC Argeş	A	1–0
29	3 June 2006	FC Naţional	H	2–1
30	7 June 2006	Politehnica Timișoara	A	0–0

Cupa României
Round	Date	Opponent	Stadium	Result
Last 32	21 September 2005	Dunărea Galaţi	Galaţi	1–0
Last 16	26 October 2005	Petrolul Ploieşti	Otopeni	1–2

== UEFA Cup ==
Qualifying round

11 August 2005
21:45

Dinamo București	3–1	(Cyprus) AC Omonia
Munteanu 10' (pen.); Zicu 25', 43'		Konnafis 4'

Stadionul Dinamo, Bucharest
Attendance: 10,000
Referee: Alfonso Pérez Burrull (Spain)

25 August 2005
20:30

AC Omonia (Cyprus)	2–1	Dinamo București
Kaiafas 21'; Christou 31'		Niculescu 55'

GSP Stadium, Nicosia
Attendance: 18,000
Referee: Igor Zakharov (Russia)

Dinamo won 4-3 on aggregate.

First round

15 September 2005
21:45

Dinamo București	5–1	(England) Everton
Niculescu 27'; Zicu 52'; Petre 70'; Bratu 75', 90+2'		Yobo 30'

Stadionul Dinamo, Bucharest
Attendance: 14,000
Referee: Gianluca Paparesta (Italy)

29 September 2005
22:00

Everton (England)	1–0	Dinamo București
Cahill 28'

Goodison Park, Liverpool
Attendance: 40,000
Referee: Laurent Duhamel (France)

Dinamo won 5-2 on aggregate.

Group phase

Team	Pts	Pld	W	D	L	GF	GA	GD
(France) Marseille	9	4	3	0	1	5	3	+2
(Bulgaria) Levski Sofia	6	4	2	0	2	4	4	0
(Netherlands) Heerenveen	5	4	1	2	1	2	2	0
(Russia) CSKA Moscow	4	4	1	1	2	3	4	-1
(Romania) Dinamo București	4	4	1	1	2	2	3	-1

20 October 2005
21:45

Dinamo București	0–0	(Netherlands) Heerenveen

Stadionul Dinamo, Bucharest
Attendance: 11,000
Referee: Jacek Granat (Poland)

3 November 2005
19:00

Levski Sofia (Bulgaria)	1–0	Dinamo București
Angelov 90+3'

Georgi Asparuhov Stadium, Sofia
Attendance: 22,000
Referee: Nikolai Ivanov (Russia)

1 December 2005
19:30

Dinamo București	1–0	(Russia) CSKA Moscow
Munteanu 71'

Stadionul Dinamo, Bucharest
Attendance: 8,000
Referee: Fritz Stuchlik (Austria)

14 December 2005
21:45

Olympique de Marseille (France)	2–1	Dinamo București
Cesar 38'; Delfim 45'		Niculescu 51'

Stade Vélodrome, Marseille
Attendance: 15,000
Referee: Julián Rodríguez Santiago (Spain)

== Squad ==
Goalkeepers: Vladimir Gaev (13/0), Adnan Guso (4/0), Cristian Munteanu (14/0), Florin Matache (1/0).

Defenders: Ionuţ Bălan (9/0), Cosmin Bărcăuan (8/0), Tiberiu Curt (7/2), Mariko Daouda (5/0), Daniel Florea (9/0), George Galamaz (18/0), Lucian Goian (4/0), Dorin Mihuţ (11/0), Cosmin Moţi (27/1), Cristian Pulhac (20/0), Ştefan Radu (8/0), Dorin Semeghin (1/0), Gabriel Tamaș (14/1).

Midfielders: Dan Alexa (13/1), Adrian Cristea (15/0), Ştefan Grigorie (28/10), Andrei Mărgăritescu (20/0), Cătălin Munteanu (10/0), Vlad Munteanu (17/2), Florentin Petre (26/2), Mihăiţă Pleşan (12/2), Adrian Ropotan (5/0), Ianis Zicu (27/9).

Forwards: Alexandru Bălţoi (12/4), Florin Bratu (23/6), Octavian Chihaia (3/0), Ionel Dănciulescu (14/2), Liviu Ganea (1/0), Claudiu Niculescu (20/12).

== Transfers ==
New players: Summer break – Adnan Guso (Universitatea Craiova), Cristian Munteanu (FC Naţional), Cosmin Moţi, Mariko Daouda, Mihăiţă Pleşan, Ilie Iordache, Claudiu Drăgan (all from Universitatea Craiova), Florin Bratu (FC Nantes), Octavian Chihaia (FC Naţional)

Winter break – Cristian Munteanu (AEK Larnaca), Tiberiu Curt (Steaua București), Cosmin Bărcăuan, Daniel Florea (both Shakhtar Donetsk), Dorin Mihuţ (FC Bihor), Dan Alexa (Beijing Hyundai), Cătălin Munteanu (free player), Ionel Dănciulescu (Shandong Luneng)

Adrian Ropotan was promoted from the youth team.

Left team: Summer break – Bogdan Stelea (Akratitos), Cristian Munteanu (AEK Larnaca), Angelo Alistar (Hapoel Petach-Tikva), Ovidiu Burcã (FC Naţional), Alin Ilin (Jiul Petroşani), Claudiu Drãgan (Jiul Petroşani), Tibor Moldovan (Farul Constanţa), Ionut Badea (FC Vaslui), Adrian Mihalcea (Chunnam Dragons), Alexandru Pãcurar (Gloria Bistriţa).

Winter break – Adnan Guso (FC Argeş), Lucian Goian (Ceahlăul), Mariko Daouda (FC Argeş), Gabriel Tamaş (Spartak Moskva), Adrian Iordache (Shinnik Yaroslavl), Mihăiţă Pleşan (Poli Timișoara), Alexandru Bãlţoi (Oţelul Galaţi), Octavian Chihaia (FC Naţional).
