= 2006–07 FC Dinamo București season =

FC Dinamo București
2006–07 season
- Manager: Mircea Rednic
- Liga I: 1st
- Romanian Cup: Last 16
- UEFA Cup: Last 32
- Top goalscorer: Claudiu Niculescu (18 goals)

The 2006-07 season was FC Dinamo București's 58th season in Liga I. Dinamo qualified for the European Spring by beating Beşiktaş and Bayer Leverkusen 2–1 in Bucharest, drawing 1–1 at Club Brugge and losing 3–1 in London to Tottenham Hotspur. In the next round they faced Benfica, but were eliminated after a 0–1 loss at Da Luz and a 1–2 loss at home. Domestically, the team crushed most of its opponents in the first 19 rounds, ending up autumn champions, 13 points ahead of second place. After two spectacular away wins against the rivals, 4–2 with Steaua and 4–1 with Rapid, Dinamo relaxed and let some points slip in other matches. Nevertheless, they secured their 18th title with four rounds to spare.

== Results ==
Liga I
Round	Date	Opponent	Stadium	Result
1	30 July 2006	FC Naţional	A	2–1
2	6 August 2006	Pandurii Târgu Jiu	H	1–0
3	13 August 2006	Jiul Petroşani	A	1–0
4	20 August 2006	Politehnica Timișoara	H	3–1
5	27 August 2006	Universitatea Craiova	A	4–0
6	10 September 2006	UT Arad	H	2–0
7	17 September 2006	FC Vaslui	A	2–1
8	20 September 2006	Steaua București	H	1–0
9	24 September 2006	FC Argeş	A	3–2
10	1 October 2006	Rapid București	H	3–1
11	14 October 2006	Farul Constanţa	H	2–1
12	21 October 2006	Gloria Bistriţa	A	1–0
13	28 October 2006	Politehnica Iaşi	H	5–0
14	5 November 2006	CFR Cluj	A	1–2
15	11 November 2006	Oţelul Galaţi	H	3–0
16	18 November 2006	Unirea Urziceni	A	1–1
17	26 November 2006	Ceahlăul Piatra Neamţ	H	2–0
18	4 December 2006	FC Naţional	H	1–0
19	10 December 2006	Pandurii Târgu Jiu	A	3–0
20	26 February 2007	Jiul Petroşani	H	1–0
21	4 March 2007	Politehnica Timișoara	A	1–1
22	11 March 2007	Universitatea Craiova	H	0–0
23	18 March 2007	UT Arad	A	1–1
24	31 March 2007	FC Vaslui	H	0–0
25	7 April 2007	Steaua București	A	4–2
26	15 April 2007	FC Argeş	H	2–1
27	22 April 2007	Rapid București	A	4–1
28	25 April 2007	Farul Constanţa	A	1–1
29	29 April 2007	Gloria Bistriţa	H	2–0
30	5 May 2007	Politehnica Iaşi	A	1–1
31	8 May 2007	CFR Cluj	H	1–0
32	12 May 2007	Oţelul Galaţi	A	1–2
33	19 May 2007	Unirea Urziceni	H	1–2
34	23 May 2007	Ceahlăul Piatra Neamţ	A	2–2

Liga I 2006–07 Winners
Dinamo București
18th Title

Cupa României
Round	Date	Opponent	Stadium	Result
Last 32	24 October 2006	Farul II Constanţa	București	3–1
Last 16	8 November 2006	Pandurii Târgu Jiu	București	0–1

== UEFA Cup ==
First qualifying round

13 July 2006
22:00

Hibernians F.C. (Malta)	0–4	Dinamo București
		Dănciulescu 4'; Niculescu 57', 59'; Şt.Radu 85'

Ta' Qali National Stadium, Ta' Qali
Attendance: 300
Referee: Igor Zakharov (Russia)

28 July 2006
21:00

Dinamo București	5–1	(Malta) Hibernians F.C.
Cristea 55'; Dănciulescu 61', 85'; Munteanu 90+1'; Buzurović 90+3' (o.g.)		Buzurović 86'

Stadionul Dinamo, Bucharest
Attendance: 5,000
Referee: Vlado Svilokos (Croatia)

Dinamo won 9-1 on aggregate.

Second qualifying round

10 August 2006
21:00

Dinamo București	1–0	(Israel) Beitar Jerusalem
Munteanu 76'

Stadionul Dinamo, Bucharest
Attendance: 8,500
Referee: Vitalyi Godulyan (Ukraine)

24 August 2006
21:00

Beitar Jerusalem (Israel)	1–1	Dinamo București
Yitzhaki 4'		Gershon 23' (o.g.)

Georgi Asparuhov Stadium, Sofia^{1}
Attendance: 500
Referee: Johny Ver Eecke (Belgium)

^{1}Due to the armed conflict going on in Israel, UEFA decided that no European matches could be staged in the country until further notice. Beitar Jerusalem's home match was moved to Sofia, Bulgaria.

Dinamo won 2-1 on aggregate.

First round

14 September 2006
19:00

Skoda Xanthi (Greece)	3–4	Dinamo București
Quintana 8', 45'; Kazakis 66'		Niculescu 18', 34'; Dănciulescu 25'; Pulhac 84'

Skoda Xanthi Arena, Xanthi
Attendance: 6,000
Referee: Novo Panić (Bosnia and Herzegovina)

28 September 2006
20:00

Dinamo București	4–1	(Greece) Skoda Xanthi
Niculescu 12', 82'; Cristea 47'; Dănciulescu 79'		Paviot 52'

Stadionul Dinamo, Bucharest
Attendance: 9,000
Referee: Igor Egorov (Russia)

Dinamo won 8-4 on aggregate.

Group phase

Team	Pld	W	D	L	GF	GA	GD	Pts
(England) Tottenham Hotspur	4	4	0	0	9	2	+7	12
(Romania) Dinamo București	4	2	1	1	6	6	0	7
(Germany) Bayer Leverkusen	4	1	1	2	4	5	−1	4
(Turkey) Beşiktaş	4	1	0	3	4	7	−3	3
(Belgium) Club Brugge	4	0	2	2	4	7	−3	2

2 November 2006
20:30

Dinamo București	2–1	(Turkey) Beşiktaş
Cristea 21'; Niculescu 87' (pen.)		Bobô 58'

Stadionul Dinamo, Bucharest
Attendance: 11,000
Referee: Darko Ceferin (Slovenia)

23 November 2006
21:30

Club Brugge (Belgium)	1–1	Dinamo București
Vermant 62' (pen.)		Niculescu 33'

Jan Breydel Stadium, Bruges
Attendance: 24,000
Referee: Martin Ingvarsson (Sweden)

29 November 2006
21:45

Dinamo București	2–1	(Germany) Bayer Leverkusen
Niculescu 37', 74'		Barbarez 22'

Stadionul Dinamo, Bucharest
Attendance: 12,000
Referee: João Ferreira (Portugal)

14 December 2006
21:45

Tottenham Hotspur (England)	3–1	Dinamo București
Berbatov 16'; Defoe 39', 50'		Mendy 90+1'

White Hart Lane, London
Attendance: 34,000
Referee: Bernhard Brugger (Austria)

Round of 32

14 February 2007
20:00

Benfica (Portugal)	1–0	Dinamo București
Miccoli 90'	Report

Estádio da Luz, Lisbon
Attendance: 35,000
Referee: Ivan Bebek (Croatia)

22 February 2007
20:15

Dinamo București	1–2	(Portugal) Benfica
Munteanu 24'	Report	Anderson 50'; Katsouranis 64'

Stadionul Dinamo, Bucharest
Attendance: 15,000
Referee: Nicolai Vollquartz (Denmark)

Benfica won 3-1 on aggregate.

== Squad ==
Goalkeepers: Uladzimir Hayew (Belarus) (11 / 0); Bogdan Lobonț (14 / 0); Florin Matache (7 / 0); Glen Moss (New Zealand) (1 / 0); Deniss Romanovs (Latvia) (1 / 0).
Defenders: George Blay (Ghana) (31 / 0); Silviu Bălace (9 / 0); Eugen Crăciun (1 / 0); George Galamaz (1 / 0); Lucian Goian (7 / 0); Sergiu Homei (1 / 0); Dorin Mihuț (5 / 0); Cosmin Moți (29 / 1); Nicolae Mușat (2 / 0); Cosmin Pașcovici (4 / 0); Cristian Pulhac (32 / 0); Ștefan Radu (32 / 1); Adrian Scarlatache (6 / 0); Māris Smirnovs (Latvia) (1 / 0).
Midfielders: Adrian Cristea (28 / 3); Fabrice Fernandes (France) (5 / 0); Leo Lerinc (Serbia) (1 / 0); Andrei Mărgăritescu (31 / 1); Cătălin Munteanu (32 / 4); Andrei Nițu (2 / 0); Cornel Predescu (8 / 0); Adrian Ropotan (21 / 0); Sreten Stanić (Serbia) (1 / 0); Dennis Șerban (7 / 2); Iulian Tameș (15 / 0); Vojislav Vranjković (Bosnia and Herzegovina) (9 / 0); Zé Kalanga (Angola) (21 / 2).
Forwards: Ionel Dănciulescu (31 / 15); Ionel Ganea (18 / 14); Liviu Ganea (9 / 2); Valentin Lemnaru (1 / 0); Jean-Philippe Mendy (France) (9 / 0); Claudiu Niculescu (31 / 18).
(league appearances and goals listed in brackets)

Manager: Mircea Rednic.

== Transfers ==
New players: Summer break – Glen Moss -New Zealand (New Zealand Knights FC), George Blay -Ghana- (RAAL La Louviere), Cosmin Paşcovici (Farul Constanţa), Lucian Goian (Ceahlăul Piatra-Neamţ), Iulian Tameş (FC Naţional), Zé Kalanga Nsimba Paulo Baptista -Angola- (Atlético Petróleos Luanda), Leo Lerinc -Serbia- (Ethnikos Achnas), Sreten Stanić -Serbia- (FCU Politehnica Timișoara), Ionel Ganea (Wolverhampton Wanderers)

Winter break – Bogdan Lobonţ (AC Fiorentina), Deniss Romanovs -Latvia- (SK Ditton Daugavpils), Maris Smirnovs -Latvia- (SK Ditton Daugavpils), Sergiu Homei (FC Sopron), Silviu Bălace (FCU Politehnica Timișoara), Vojislav Vranjković -Serbia- (Pandurii Târgu-Jiu), Fabrice Fernandes -Franţa- (Beitar Jerusalem).

Left team: Summer break – Cosmin Bărcăuan (PAOK Thessaloniki), Szabolcs Perenyi (Farul Constanţa), Daniel Florea (APOEL Nicosia), Tiberiu Curt (retired), Florentin Petre (CSKA Sofia), Dan Alexa (FCU Politehnica Timișoara), Alin Ilin (FC Naţional București), Ştefan Grigorie (FCU Politehnica Timișoara), Vlad Munteanu (FC Energie Cottbus), Ianis Zicu (Rapid București), Florin Bratu (FC Nantes-Atlantique), Claudiu Drăgan (FC Naţional București)

Winter break – Vladimir Gaev -Belarus (Chornomorets Odesa), Florin Matache (FC Vaslui), Mircea Oltean (Unirea Urziceni), George Galamaz (Unirea Urziceni), Cosmin Paşcovici (FCM UTA Arad), Lucian Goian (Ceahlăul Piatra-Neamţ), Dorin Mihuţ (FCM UTA Arad), Cornel Predescu (Gloria Bistriţa), Iulian Tameş (FC Argeş Piteşti), Dennis Şerban (free player), Dan Codreanu (Gloria Bistriţa), Mihai Damaschin (Gloria Bistriţa), Ionel Ganea (Rapid București)
