= 1999–2000 UD Salamanca season =

UD Salamanca
1999–2000 season
- President: Juan José Hidalgo
- Head coach: Mariano García Remón
- Stadium: Helmántico Stadium
- Segunda División: 4th
- Copa del Rey: First round

The 1999–2000 season was the 77th season in the existence of UD Salamanca and the club's first season back in the second division of Spanish football.

== Competitions ==
=== Overall record ===
Competition	First match	Last match	Starting round	Final position	Record							
Competition	First match	Last match	Starting round	Final position	Pld	W	D	L	GF	GA	GD	Win %
Segunda División	22 August 1999	4 June 2000	Matchday 1	4th	42	18	12	12	54	43	+11	42.86
Copa del Rey	10 November 1999	1 December 1999	First round	First round	2	0	1	1	4	6	−2	0.00
Total					44	18	13	13	58	49	+9	40.91

Source: BDFutbol

=== Segunda División ===
==== League table ====
Pos	Team	Pld	W	D	L	GF	GA	GD	Pts	Promotion or relegation
2	Osasuna (P)	42	20	7	15	50	36	+14	67	Promotion to La Liga
3	Villarreal (P)	42	18	12	12	61	46	+15	66	Promotion to La Liga
4	Salamanca	42	18	12	12	54	43	+11	66	
5	Lleida	42	18	9	15	66	52	+14	63	
6	Mérida (R)	42	16	15	11	41	34	+7	63	Relegation to Segunda División B (Note: CP Mérida was relegated to Segunda División B for not paying its players. Then, Recreativo de Huelva was readmitted in Segunda División.)

Rules for classification: 1st points; 2nd head-to-head points; 3rd head-to-head goal difference; 4th head-to-head goals scored; 5th goal difference; 6th number of goals scored; 7th Fair-play points
(P) Promoted; (R) Relegated

==== Results summary ====
Overall								Home						Away					
Pld	W	D	L	GF	GA	GD	Pts	W	D	L	GF	GA	GD	W	D	L	GF	GA	GD
0	0	0	0	0	0	0	0	0	0	0	0	0	0	0	0	0	0	0	0

==== Results by round ====
Round	1
Ground	
Result	
Position	

A = Away; H = Home; W = Win; D = Draw; L = Loss

==== Matches ====
22 August 1999 1	Salamanca	2–1	Elche	Villares de la Reina
				Stadium: Estadio Helmántico

29 August 1999 2	Villarreal	0–0	Salamanca	Villarreal
				Stadium: Estadio El Madrigal

5 September 1999 3	Salamanca	3–0	Levante	Villares de la Reina
				Stadium: Estadio Helmántico

12 September 1999 4	Tenerife	1–1	Salamanca	Santa Cruz de Tenerife
				Stadium: Estadio Heliodoro Rodríguez

18 September 1999 5	Salamanca	3–2	Sporting Gijón	Villares de la Reina
				Stadium: Estadio Helmántico

26 September 1999 6	Recreativo	0–1	Salamanca	Huelva
				Stadium: Estadio Colombino

3 October 1999 7	Salamanca	0–0	Toledo	Villares de la Reina
				Stadium: Estadio Helmántico

10 October 1999 8	Mérida	1–2	Salamanca	Mérida
				Stadium: Estadio Romano

12 October 1999 9	Salamanca	1–2	Atlético Madrid B	Villares de la Reina
				Stadium: Estadio Helmántico

16 October 1999 10	Leganés	1–2	Salamanca	Leganés
				Stadium: Butarque Stadium

24 October 1999 11	Salamanca	1–0	Osasuna	Villares de la Reina
				Stadium: Estadio Helmántico

31 October 1999 12	Compostela	2–2	Salamanca	Santiago de Compostela
				Stadium: San Lázaro

6 November 1999 13	Salamanca	4–1	Córdoba	Villares de la Reina
				Stadium: Estadio Helmántico

14 November 1999 14	Las Palmas	0–2	Salamanca	Las Palmas
				Stadium: Estadio Insular

21 November 1999 15	Salamanca	3–0	Logroñés	Villares de la Reina
				Stadium: Estadio Helmántico

27 November 1999 16	Lleida	1–2	Salamanca	Lleida
				Stadium: Camp d'Esports

5 December 1999 17	Extremadura	1–0	Salamanca	Almendralejo
				Stadium: Estadio Francisco de la Hera

11 December 1999 18	Salamanca	2–1	Albacete	Villares de la Reina
				Stadium: Estadio Helmántico

18 December 1999 19	Badajoz	2–2	Salamanca	Badajoz
				Stadium: Estadio Nuevo Vivero

4 January 2000 20	Salamanca	1–1	Getafe	Villares de la Reina
				Stadium: Estadio Helmántico

8 January 2000 21	Eibar	1–0	Salamanca	Eibar
				Stadium: Ipurua

16 January 2000 22	Elche	2–2	Salamanca	Elche
				Stadium: Estadio Martínez Valero

23 January 2000 23	Salamanca	0–2	Villarreal	Villares de la Reina
				Stadium: Estadio Helmántico

30 January 2000 24	Levante	2–3	Salamanca	Valencia
				Stadium: Ciutat de València

6 February 2000 25	Salamanca	3–0	Tenerife	Villares de la Reina
				Stadium: Estadio Helmántico

13 February 2000 26	Sporting Gijón	2–0	Salamanca	Gijón
				Stadium: El Molinón

20 February 2000 27	Salamanca	0–1	Recreativo	Villares de la Reina
				Stadium: Estadio Helmántico

27 February 2000 28	Toledo	3–0	Salamanca	Toledo
				Stadium: Estadio Salto del Caballo

5 March 2000 29	Salamanca	0–0	Mérida	Villares de la Reina
				Stadium: Estadio Helmántico

11 March 2000 30	Atlético Madrid B	2–1	Salamanca	Majadahonda
				Stadium: Estadio Cerro del Espino

19 March 2000 31	Salamanca	0–1	Leganés	Villares de la Reina
				Stadium: Estadio Helmántico

26 March 2000 32	Osasuna	1–0	Salamanca	Pamplona
				Stadium: El Sadar

2 April 2000 33	Salamanca	0–0	Compostela	Villares de la Reina
				Stadium: Estadio Helmántico

9 April 2000 34	Córdoba	0–0	Salamanca	Córdoba
				Stadium: Estadio Nuevo Arcángel

16 April 2000 35	Salamanca	0–2	Las Palmas	Villares de la Reina
				Stadium: Estadio Helmántico

23 April 2000 36	Logroñés	0–0	Salamanca	Logroño
				Stadium: Las Gaunas

30 April 2000 37	Salamanca	2–1	Lleida	Villares de la Reina
				Stadium: Estadio Helmántico

7 May 2000 38	Salamanca	2–1	Extremadura	Villares de la Reina
				Stadium: Estadio Helmántico

13 May 2000 39	Albacete	1–0	Salamanca	Albacete
				Stadium: Estadio Carlos Belmonte

21 May 2000 40	Salamanca	2–2	Badajoz	Villares de la Reina
				Stadium: Estadio Helmántico

28 May 2000 41	Getafe	1–3	Salamanca	Getafe
				Stadium: Coliseum Alfonso Pérez

4 June 2000 42	Salamanca	2–1	Eibar	Villares de la Reina
				Stadium: Estadio Helmántico

=== Copa del Rey ===
==== First round ====
10 November 1999 First leg	Salamanca	2–2	Rayo Vallecano	Villares de la Reina
				Stadium: Estadio Helmántico

1 December 1999 Second leg	Rayo Vallecano	4–2 (6–4 agg.)	Salamanca	Madrid
