= 2002–03 Albacete Balompié season =

Albacete
2002–03 season
- President: Ángel Contreras Plasencia
- Head coach: César Ferrando
- Stadium: Estadio Carlos Belmonte
- Segunda División: 3rd (promoted)
- Copa del Rey: Round of 16
- Top goalscorer: League: Jesús Perera (22); All: Jesús Perera (22)

The 2002–03 season was the 62nd season in the existence of Albacete Balompié and the club's seventh consecutive season in the second division of Spanish football. In addition to the domestic league, Albacete participated in this season's edition of the Copa del Rey. The season covered the period from 1 July 2002 to 30 June 2003. The club achieved promotion to the top flight after finishing in third place.

== Competitions ==
=== Overall record ===
Competition	First match	Last match	Starting round	Final position	Record							
Competition	First match	Last match	Starting round	Final position	Pld	W	D	L	GF	GA	GD	Win %
Segunda División	31 August 2002	29 June 2003	Matchday 1	3rd	42	17	20	5	51	30	+21	40.48
Copa del Rey	11 September 2002		Round of 64	Round of 64	1	0	0	1	1	2	−1	0.00
Total					43	17	20	6	52	32	+20	39.53

Source: Competitions

=== Segunda División ===
==== League table ====
Pos	Team	Pld	W	D	L	GF	GA	GD	Pts	Promotion or relegation
1	Murcia (C, P)	42	23	10	9	59	22	+37	79	Promotion to La Liga
2	Zaragoza (P)	42	20	12	10	54	40	+14	72	Promotion to La Liga
3	Albacete (P)	42	17	20	5	51	30	+21	71	Promotion to La Liga
4	Levante	42	16	17	9	59	44	+15	65	
5	Las Palmas	42	16	16	10	53	43	+10	64 (Note: XER 2–2 LPA; LPA 4–0 XER)	

Source: LFP - Liga Adelante
Rules for classification: 1st points; 2nd head-to-head points; 3rd head-to-head goal difference; 4th head-to-head goals scored; 5th goal difference; 6th number of goals scored; 7th Fair-play points
(C) Champions; (P) Promoted

==== Results summary ====
Overall								Home						Away					
Pld	W	D	L	GF	GA	GD	Pts	W	D	L	GF	GA	GD	W	D	L	GF	GA	GD
42	17	20	5	51	30	+21	71	9	10	2	25	11	+14	8	10	3	26	19	+7

Source: Segunda División

==== Results by round ====
Round	1	2	3	4	5	6	7	8	9	10	11	12	13	14	15	16	17	18	19	20	21	22	23	24	25	26	27	28	29	30	31	32	33	34	35	36	37	38	39	40	41	42
Ground	A	H	A	H	A	H	A	H	H	A	H	A	H	A	H	A	H	A	H	A	H	H	A	H	A	H	A	H	A	A	H	A	H	A	H	A	H	A	H	A	H	A
Result	D	W	W	D	L	W	D	W	D	W	D	D	D	D	W	D	L	W	D	D	D	W	W	W	W	D	W	W	D	W	D	W	D	D	W	L	D	D	W	D	L	L
Position	9	8	1	5	6	4	5	3	5	3	3	3	3	4	3	3	4	4	4	4	4	4	3	2	1	2	2	2	2	2	2	1	2	2	2	3	3	3	2	2	3	3

Source: Segunda División
A = Away; H = Home; W = Win; D = Draw; L = Loss

==== Matches ====
31 August 2002 1	Terrassa	1–1	Albacete	Terrassa
CEST (UTC+2)				Stadium: Estadi Olímpic de Terrassa

15 September 2002 2	Albacete	1–0	Badajoz	Albacete
CEST (UTC+2)				Stadium: Carlos Belmonte

21 September 2002 3	Numancia	1–2	Albacete	Soria
CEST (UTC+2)				Stadium: Los Pajaritos

29 September 2002 4	Albacete	1–1	Elche	Albacete
CEST (UTC+2)				Stadium: Carlos Belmonte

5 October 2002 5	Xerez	1–0	Albacete	Jerez de la Frontera
CEST (UTC+2)				Stadium: Chapín

13 October 2002 6	Albacete	4–0	Sporting Gijón	Albacete
CEST (UTC+2)				Stadium: Carlos Belmonte

20 October 2002 7	Leganés	1–1	Albacete	Leganés
CEST (UTC+2)				Stadium: Butarque

27 October 2002 8	Albacete	2–1	Las Palmas	Albacete
CEST (UTC+2)				Stadium: Carlos Belmonte

2 November 2002 9	Albacete	1–1	Poli Ejido	Albacete
CET (UTC+1)				Stadium: Carlos Belmonte

10 November 2002 10	Salamanca	0–1	Albacete	Villares de la Reina
CET (UTC+1)				Stadium: Helmántico

16 November 2002 11	Albacete	0–0	Córdoba	Albacete
CET (UTC+1)				Stadium: Carlos Belmonte

24 November 2002 12	Levante	2–2	Albacete	Valencia
CET (UTC+1)				Stadium: Ciutat de València

1 December 2002 13	Albacete	0–0	Murcia	Albacete
CET (UTC+1)				Stadium: Carlos Belmonte

7 December 2002 14	Tenerife	1–1	Albacete	Santa Cruz de Tenerife
CET (UTC+1)				Stadium: Heliodoro Rodríguez López

14 December 2002 15	Albacete	2–0	Racing Ferrol	Albacete
CET (UTC+1)				Stadium: Carlos Belmonte

21 December 2002 16	Compostela	3–3	Albacete	Santiago de Compostela
CET (UTC+1)				Stadium: Vero Boquete de San Lázaro

5 January 2003 17	Albacete	0–1	Oviedo	Albacete
CET (UTC+1)				Stadium: Carlos Belmonte

12 January 2003 18	Getafe	1–2	Albacete	Getafe
CET (UTC+1)				Stadium: Coliseum Alfonso Pérez

18 January 2003 19	Albacete	0–0	Zaragoza	Albacete
CET (UTC+1)				Stadium: Carlos Belmonte

26 January 2003 20	Almería	1–1	Albacete	Almería
CET (UTC+1)				Stadium: Estadio de los Juegos Mediterráneos

2 February 2003 21	Albacete	1–1	Eibar	Albacete
CET (UTC+1)				Stadium: Carlos Belmonte

9 February 2003 22	Albacete	1–0	Terrassa	Albacete
CET (UTC+1)				Stadium: Carlos Belmonte

16 February 2003 23	Badajoz	0–3	Albacete	Badajoz
CET (UTC+1)				Stadium: Estadio Nuevo Vivero

23 February 2003 24	Albacete	3–1	Numancia	Albacete
CET (UTC+1)				Stadium: Carlos Belmonte

2 March 2003 25	Elche	1–2	Albacete	Elche
CET (UTC+1)				Stadium: Martínez Valero

9 March 2003 26	Albacete	0–0	Xerez	Albacete
CET (UTC+1)				Stadium: Carlos Belmonte

16 March 2003 27	Sporting Gijón	0–1	Albacete	Gijón
CET (UTC+1)				Stadium: El Molinón

23 March 2003 28	Albacete	2–0	Leganés	Albacete
CET (UTC+1)				Stadium: Carlos Belmonte

29 March 2003 29	Las Palmas	1–1	Albacete	Las Palmas
CET (UTC+1)				Stadium: Estadio Gran Canaria

6 April 2003 30	Poli Ejido	0–1	Albacete	El Ejido
CET (UTC+2)				Stadium: Santo Domingo

13 April 2003 31	Albacete	0–0	Salamanca	Albacete
CET (UTC+2)				Stadium: Carlos Belmonte

20 April 2003 32	Córdoba	0–2	Albacete	Córdoba
CET (UTC+2)				Stadium: Estadio Nuevo Arcángel

27 April 2003 33	Albacete	2–2	Levante	Albacete
CET (UTC+2)				Stadium: Carlos Belmonte

4 May 2003 34	Murcia	0–0	Albacete	Murcia
CET (UTC+2)				Stadium: Nueva Condomina

10 May 2003 35	Albacete	1–0	Tenerife	Albacete
CET (UTC+2)				Stadium: Carlos Belmonte

17 May 2003 36	Racing Ferrol	2–1	Albacete	Ferrol
CET (UTC+2)				Stadium: Estadio Municipal da Malata

24 May 2003 37	Albacete	1–1	Compostela	Albacete
CET (UTC+2)				Stadium: Carlos Belmonte

31 May 2003 38	Oviedo	0–0	Albacete	Oviedo
CET (UTC+2)				Stadium: Carlos Tartiere

8 June 2003 39	Albacete	3–1	Getafe	Albacete
CET (UTC+2)				Stadium: Carlos Belmonte

15 June 2003 40	Zaragoza	1–1	Albacete	Zaragoza
CET (UTC+2)				Stadium: La Romareda

21 June 2003 41	Albacete	0–1	Almería	Albacete
CET (UTC+2)				Stadium: Carlos Belmonte; Referee: Francisco Arcas Piqueres

29 June 2003 42	Eibar	2–0	Albacete	Eibar
CET (UTC+2)				Stadium: Ipurua; Referee: Carlos Clos Gómez

=== Copa del Rey ===
11 September 2002 Round of 64	Albacete	1–2	Eibar	Albacete
CEST (UTC+2)				Stadium: Carlos Belmonte
