= Doru Frîncu =

Romanian bobsledder

Personal information
- Other names: Doru Frâncu; Doru Frâncu-Cioclei
- Nationality: Romanian
- Born: 5 May 1954 (age 72) Fântâna Domnească, Romania

Sport
- Sport: Bobsleigh

Doru Frîncu or Doru Frâncu-Cioclei (born 5 May 1954) is a Romanian bobsledder. He competed in the four man event at the 1980 Winter Olympics.

Frîncu was coach to the Australian Olympic bobsleigh team from as early as 1989 through 2006. His mentees included Grant Edwards. Since 2009, Frîncu has taught physical education at Glenunga International High School, South Australia.
