= Toporu =

- Commune
- Location in Romania
- Coordinates: 44°1′N 25°39′E
- Country: Romania
- County: Giurgiu

Government
  - Mayor (2020–2024): Constantin I. Ionescu (PSD)
- Area: 91.47 km^{2} (35.32 sq mi)
- Elevation: 85 m (279 ft)
- Population (2021-12-01): 1,695
  - Density: 19/km^{2} (48/sq mi)
- Time zone: EET/EEST (UTC+2/+3)
- Postal code: 087225
- Area code: +(40) x46
- Vehicle reg.: GR
- Website: primariatoporu.ro

Toporu is a commune located in Giurgiu County, Muntenia, Romania. It is composed of two villages, Tomulești and Toporu.

Historical population
Year	Pop.	±%
2002	2,576	—
2011	2,340	−9.2%
2021	1,695	−27.6%
Source: Census data

== Natives ==
- Dinu Adameșteanu (1913 – 2004), archaeologist
- Andrei Speriatu (born 1957), footballer
