= Andrei Speriatu =

Romanian footballer

Personal information
- Date of birth: 29 September 1957 (age 69)
- Place of birth: Toporu, Romania
- Height: 1.75 m (5 ft 9 in)
- Position: Goalkeeper

Team information
- Current team: Argeș Pitești (head of scouting)

Youth career
- 1972–1973: Spicu Toporu
- 1973–1976: Argeș Pitești

Senior career*
| Years | Team | Apps | (Gls) |
| 1976–1980 | Argeș Pitești | 62 | (0) |
| 1980–1981 | Dinamo București | 28 | (0) |
| 1981–1986 | Sportul Studențesc | 157 | (0) |
| 1986–1990 | Argeș Pitești | 116 | (0) |
| 1990–1991 | Sportul Studențesc | 23 | (0) |
| 1991–1992 | Shimshon Tel Aviv | | (0) |
| 1992–1993 | Sportul Studențesc | 20 | (0) |
| 1993–1994 | Dacia Pitești | | (0) |
| Total | | 406 | (0) |

International career
| 1976–1977 | Romania U21 | 6 | (0) |
| 1976–1979 | Romania Olympic | 14 | (0) |
| 1979–1986 | Romania | 4 | (0) |

Managerial career
- Dacia Pitești
- 1997–1998: Sportul Studențesc București
- 2007–2010: Steaua București (GK Coach)
- 2011–2012: Universitatea Cluj (GK Coach)
- 2013: Universitatea Cluj (GK Coach)
- 2019–: Argeș Pitești (head of scouting)
- 2023: Argeș Pitești (assistant)
- * Club domestic league appearances and goals

Andrei Speriatu (born 29 September 1957) is a Romanian former professional footballer who played as a goalkeeper. He is considered to have been an important player of Argeș Pitești and Sportul Studențesc, also playing for teams such as Dinamo București, Shimshon Tel Aviv or Dacia Pitești.

== Club career ==
Speriatu was born on 29 September 1957 in Toporu, Romania and began playing junior-level football in 1972 at local club Spicu. In 1973 he joined Argeș Pitești where he made his Divizia A debut on 21 November 1976 when coach Florin Halagian sent him in the 63rd minute to replace Cristian Gheorghe in a 3–1 away loss to UTA Arad. In the 1978–79 UEFA Cup edition he helped the team eliminate Panathinaikos in the first round with a 5–1 aggregate victory. In the following round they met Valencia led by Mario Kempes, earning a 2–1 win in the first leg, but they lost the second one with 5–2, thus the campaign ended. In the same season he helped Argeș win the title, being used by coach Halagian in 17 games, having to compete to be first-choice goalkeeper with Cristian Gheorghe.

In 1980, Speriatu went to play for one season at Dinamo București, working with coach Valentin Stănescu who used him regularly as they earned a runner-up position in the league. Afterwards he and Constantin Pană were transferred from Dinamo to Sportul Studențesc București in exchange for Dumitru Moraru. There, he spent five seasons, the highlight of this period being a second place in the 1985–86 season. He also kept clean sheet in a 1–0 victory against Inter Milan in the 1984–85 UEFA Cup, but the second leg was lost with 2–0.

In 1986, Speriatu returned to Argeș Pitești for four seasons. The team reached the 1987–88 Balkans Cup final, where he played in the first leg of the 6–1 aggregate loss to Slavia Sofia. He made a comeback in 1990 for one year at Sportul Studențesc. In 1991 he played abroad for Israeli second league side Shimshon Tel Aviv. Afterwards he came back for a third spell at Sportul Studențesc where he made his last Divizia A appearance on 20 June 1993 in a 4–2 away loss to Dinamo, totaling 406 appearances in the competition and 10 games in the UEFA Cup. Speriatu ended his career in 1994, after he spent one season at Dacia Pitești in Divizia C, helping it gain promotion to the second league.

== International career ==
Speriatu made four appearances for Romania, making his debut on 13 May 1979 under coach Florin Halagian in a 1–1 draw against Cyprus in the Euro 1980 qualifiers. His following three matches were friendlies, the last one taking place on 17 March 1986 when he kept a clean sheet in a 0–0 draw against Iraq.

== Coaching career ==
Speriatu had his first coaching experience at Dacia Pitești, then from 1997 until 1998 he was head coach of Sportul Studențesc. Afterwards he worked as a goalkeeper coach for several clubs and as an assistant on several occasions for Argeș Pitești under head coaches Nicolae Dobrin, Constantin Stancu, Marian Bondrea and Bogdan Vintilă. He also worked at Argeș's Center for Children and Juniors and was a scouter for the same team.

== Career statistics ==
Romania national team
| Year | Apps | Goals |
|---|---|---|
| 1979 | 1 | 0 |
| 1980 | 1 | 0 |
| 1986 | 2 | 0 |
| Total | 4 | 0 |

== Honours ==
Argeș Pitești

- Divizia A: 1978–79
- Balkans Cup runner-up: 1987–88

Dacia Pitești

- Divizia C: 1993–94
