= Prunișor =

- Commune
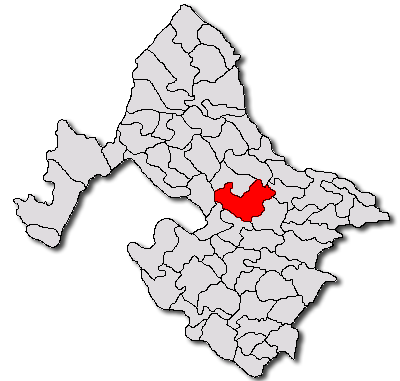
- Location in Mehedinți County

- Location in Romania
- Coordinates: 44.609°N 22.915°E
- Country: Romania
- County: Mehedinți
- Area: 122.93 km^{2} (47.46 sq mi)
- Population (2021-12-01): 2,129
  - Density: 17.32/km^{2} (44.86/sq mi)
- Time zone: UTC+02:00 (EET)
  - Summer (DST): UTC+03:00 (EEST)
- Vehicle reg.: MH

Prunișor is a commune located in Mehedinți County, Oltenia, Romania. It is composed of fifteen villages: Arvătești, Balota, Bâltanele, Cervenița, Dragotești, Fântâna Domnească, Ghelmegioaia, Gârnița, Gutu, Igiroasa, Lumnic, Mijarca, Prunaru, Prunișor, and Zegaia.

Near Balota, at 44.6003684°N 22.8193706°E, there is a 206 m (676 ft) tall guyed mast for FM and TV broadcasting.

== Natives ==
- Doru Frîncu (born 1954), bobsledder
- Sevastian Iovănescu (1953–2010), footballer
