= Doru Toma =

Romanian footballer (1957–2025)

Personal information
- Date of birth: 21 July 1957
- Place of birth: Pitești, Romania
- Date of death: 21 November 2025 (aged 68)
- Height: 1.70 m (5 ft 7 in)
- Position: Central midfielder

Youth career
- –1975: Argeș Pitești

Senior career*
Years	Team	Apps	(Gls)
1975–1986	Argeș Pitești	171	(7)
1987–1988	Chimia Râmnicu Vâlcea (Note: The statistics for the 1987–88 Divizia B are unavailable.)	15	(0)
1988–1989	Dacia Pitești		
Total		186	(7)
- * Club domestic league appearances and goals

Doru Toma (21 July 1957 – 21 November 2025) was a Romanian footballer who played as a central midfielder. Spending almost his entire career with Argeș Pitești, he won the Divizia A once.

== Career ==
Toma was born in Pitești, Romania on 21 July 1957, and began playing junior-level football at local club Argeș. He made his Divizia A debut on 7 December 1975 under coach Florin Halagian in a 2–1 home win over Dinamo București. In the 1978–79 UEFA Cup edition, he helped the team eliminate Panathinaikos in the first round, scoring a goal in the 5–1 aggregate victory. In the following round they met Valencia led by Mario Kempes, earning a 2–1 win in the first leg, but they lost the second one with 5–2 in which he scored once after an assist from Sevastian Iovănescu, thus the campaign ended. In the same season he helped Argeș win the title, being used by coach Halagian in 32 games in which he scored once. In the following season they got past AEK Athens in the first round of the 1979–80 European Cup, the team being eliminated in the following one by title holders and eventual winners, Nottingham Forest.

In 1987, Toma joined Chimia Râmnicu Vâlcea where on 25 June he made his last Divizia A appearance in a 4–0 away loss to Oțelul Galați, the team being relegated at the end of the season. He stayed one season with Chimia in Divizia B, then moved to Dacia Pitești in the same league, retiring in 1989. Toma has a total of 186 matches with seven goals in Divizia A and six games with two goals in European competitions.

== Death ==
Toma died on 21 November 2025, at the age of 68.

== Honours ==
Argeș Pitești

- Divizia A: 1978–79
