= Sergiu Moisescu =

Romanian footballer

Personal information
- Date of birth: 20 November 1952 (age 73)
- Place of birth: Pitești, Romania
- Position: Central defender

Youth career
- 1960–1973: Argeș Pitești

Senior career*
Years	Team	Apps	(Gls)
1973–1980	Argeș Pitești	33	(0)
1980–1981	Gloria Bistrița		
- * Club domestic league appearances and goals

Sergiu Moisescu (born 20 November 1952) is a Romanian former footballer who played as a defender.

== Career ==
Moisescu was born on 20 November 1952 in Pitești, Romania. He began playing junior-level football in 1960 at local club Argeș under coach Leonte Ianovschi. On 26 May 1974, he made his Divizia A debut under coach Ștefan Coidum in the last match of the season, a 2–1 loss to CFR Cluj. However, they eventually won that game 3–0 by punitive forfeiture. Subsequently, in the first round of the following season, he played under coach Florin Halagian in 3–1 away loss to Farul Constanța.

In the second round of the 1978–79 UEFA Cup, Moisescu played in a 5–2 loss to Valencia led by Mario Kempes. In the same season he helped Argeș win the title, but was used by coach Halagian in only two matches. In the following season, he played two games in the 1979–80 European Cup, as they got past AEK Athens in the first round, the team being eliminated in the following one by title holders and eventual winners, Nottingham Forest. He made his last Divizia A appearance on 25 May 1980 in a 1–1 draw against Chimia Râmnicu Vâlcea, totaling 33 matches in the competition. During his seven-season spell with Argeș, Moisescu struggled to secure a regular spot in the starting XI due to intense competition with Mihai Zamfir.

He ended his career after playing during the 1980–81 Divizia B season for Gloria Bistrița. Afterwards, Moisescu worked for 30 years as a physical education teacher.

== Honours ==
Argeș Pitești

- Divizia A: 1978–79
