= Sevastian Iovănescu =

Romanian footballer (1953–2010)

Personal information
- Date of birth: 2 October 1953
- Place of birth: Ghelmegioaia, Romania
- Date of death: 29 March 2010 (aged 56)
- Place of death: Constanța, Romania
- Position: Midfielder

Youth career
- 1968–1970: CFR Caransebeș
- 1970–1972: Steaua București

Senior career*
Years	Team	Apps	(Gls)
1972–1974	Steaua București	23	(0)
1974–1975	FC Constanța	23	(3)
1975–1980	Argeș Pitești	150	(33)
1980–1982	Olt Scornicești	46	(6)
1982–1985	Argeș Pitești	86	(12)
1985–1989	FC Constanța (Note: The statistics for the 1985–86 and 1986–87 Divizia B seasons are unavailable.)	57	(5)
Total		385	(59)

International career
1979	Romania	1	(0)
- * Club domestic league appearances and goals

Sevastian "Bebe" Iovănescu (2 October 1953 – 29 March 2010) was a Romanian football player.

== Club career ==
Iovănescu, also known as "Bebe", was born on 2 October 1953 in Ghelmegioaia, Romania and began playing junior-level football in 1968 at CFR Caransebeș, moving two years later to Steaua București. He made his Divizia A debut on 16 May 1973 under coach Gheorghe Constantin in Steaua's 0–0 draw against Universitatea Cluj.

In 1974 he went for one season to FC Constanța, then joined Argeș Pitești. In the 1977–78 season he scored a personal record of 12 goals in the league as Argeș finished in second place. Iovănescu made his debut in European competitions during the 1978–79 UEFA Cup edition when he helped the team eliminate Panathinaikos in the first round with a 5–1 aggregate victory. In the following round they met Valencia led by Mario Kempes, earning a 2–1 win in the first leg, but they lost the second one with 5–2 in which he scored once and provided an assist for Doru Toma's goal, thus the campaign ended. In the same season he helped Argeș win the title, being used by coach Florin Halagian in 32 games in which he scored seven goals. In the following season they got past AEK Athens in the first round of the 1979–80 European Cup but the team got eliminated in the following round by title holders and eventual winners, Nottingham Forest.

In 1980 he went to play for Olt Scornicești, reuniting with Halagian. After two seasons, Iovănescu made a comeback to Argeș Pitești where he would spend three and a half years. In the middle of the 1985–86 season he went for a second spell at FC Constanța, this time in Divizia B, helping them get promoted to the first league in 1988. On 17 June 1989, Iovănescu made his last Divizia A appearance in Constanța's 1–0 home win over FC Brașov, totaling 357 matches with 56 goals in the competition and eight games with one goal in European competitions.

== International career ==
Iovănescu made one appearance for Romania, playing on 13 May 1979 under coach Florin Halagian in a 1–1 draw against Cyprus in the Euro 1980 qualifiers.

== After retirement ==
After he ended his playing career, Iovănescu worked for Farul Constanța in various positions, such as assistant coach for the first team, head coach for the satellite team, coach at the team's academy and president of the club.

In 2009, he received the Rubin Order of Merit from the Romanian Football Federation, which had previously awarded him the title of Master of Sports.

== Death ==
On 29 March 2010, Iovănescu died from a viral infection in the Constanța County Hospital at the age of 56.

== Honours ==
Argeș Pitești

- Divizia A: 1978–79

Farul Constanța

- Divizia B: 1987–88
