= 1978–79 Divizia A =

61st season of top-tier football league in Romania

Divizia A
- Season: 1978–79
- Champions: FC Argeș Pitești
- Top goalscorer: Marin Radu (22)

The 1978–79 Divizia A was the sixty-first season of Divizia A, the top-level football league of Romania.

== Teams ==
Location of teams in 1978-79 Divizia A

== League table ==
Pos	Team	Pld	W	D	L	GF	GA	GD	Pts	Qualification or relegation
1	Argeș Pitești (C)	34	20	5	9	54	29	+25	45	Qualification to European Cup first round
2	Dinamo București	34	16	9	9	51	28	+23	41	Qualification to UEFA Cup first round
3	Steaua București	34	18	4	12	57	32	+25	40	Qualification to Cup Winners' Cup first round
4	Universitatea Craiova	34	15	8	11	40	25	+15	38	Qualification to UEFA Cup first round
5	FC Baia Mare	34	17	4	13	42	38	+4	38	
6	Sportul Studenţesc București	34	14	7	13	42	41	+1	35	
7	CS Târgoviște	34	15	5	14	38	38	0	35	
8	SC Bacău	34	14	6	14	37	38	−1	34	
9	ASA Târgu Mureș	34	13	6	15	49	59	−10	32	
10	Olimpia Satu Mare	34	14	4	16	38	52	−14	32	
11	Politehnica Timișoara	34	13	5	16	35	37	−2	31	
12	Politehnica Iași	34	11	9	14	37	44	−7	31	
13	Gloria Buzău	34	13	5	16	34	46	−12	31	
14	Jiul Petroșani	34	13	5	16	38	51	−13	31	
15	Chimia Râmnicu Vâlcea	34	13	5	16	38	54	−16	31	
16	Corvinul Hunedoara (R)	34	13	4	17	45	50	−5	30	Relegation to Divizia B
17	UTA Arad (R)	34	11	7	16	45	46	−1	29	Relegation to Divizia B
18	Bihor Oradea (R)	34	10	8	16	37	49	−12	28	Relegation to Divizia B

Source: LT
Rules for classification: 1) points; 2) goal difference; 3) number of goals scored
(C) Champions; (R) Relegated

=== Results ===
Home \ Away	ASA	ARG	BAC	BAI	BHO	COR	UCR	DIN	GBU	JIU	OLI	PIA	RAM	SPO	STE	POL	TAR	UTA
ASA Târgu Mureș	—	1–0	3–1	4–2	3–1	5–1	4–2	2–1	4–1	1–1	1–1	2–1	2–1	1–2	1–0	3–1	0–0	3–2
Argeș Pitești	3–1	—	1–0	3–1	1–0	2–0	2–2	1–0	2–0	2–0	4–0	4–0	2–0	3–0	1–0	3–1	1–0	4–1
Bacău	4–2	2–2	—	3–1	3–1	1–0	0–0	1–0	2–1	1–0	3–0	0–1	1–0	4–1	2–1	0–0	2–0	1–0
Baia Mare	2–0	0–0	3–1	—	1–0	1–0	1–0	2–0	1–0	4–1	3–1	0–1	3–0	2–1	1–0	0–2	5–0	1–1
Bihor Oradea	0–0	2–1	2–0	3–1	—	1–1	1–0	1–1	2–1	5–0	1–0	1–1	3–1	0–1	2–4	2–1	2–0	0–0
Corvinul Hunedoara	5–0	1–1	2–0	0–1	3–1	—	1–1	1–0	4–1	3–2	4–1	2–0	3–0	1–0	1–1	3–1	2–0	3–2
Universitatea Craiova	2–0	1–0	2–0	1–0	5–0	1–0	—	2–0	4–1	2–0	1–1	1–0	4–1	3–0	0–0	2–0	0–0	1–0
Dinamo București	1–0	3–4	4–0	1–0	1–0	4–0	1–0	—	4–0	5–1	3–1	3–1	2–0	3–1	1–1	1–1	2–0	0–0
Gloria Buzău	3–1	0–0	1–0	0–0	1–0	2–0	1–0	0–0	—	2–0	2–0	1–0	1–1	1–1	4–1	0–1	0–1	2–1
Jiul Petroșani	5–0	2–0	2–1	0–1	3–0	0–0	1–0	1–1	2–0	—	3–0	1–1	1–0	1–0	1–0	2–0	2–1	1–0
Olimpia Satu Mare	1–0	1–0	2–0	3–0	1–1	3–1	2–0	1–0	1–0	3–1	—	2–3	1–2	1–0	0–1	3–1	1–0	2–0
Politehnica Iași	2–0	1–2	1–1	0–1	1–1	1–0	0–0	1–1	1–3	2–0	2–1	—	4–1	2–2	1–0	0–0	2–0	4–1
Chimia Râmnicu Vâlcea	1–1	1–2	1–0	1–0	3–1	3–1	1–0	0–0	1–0	3–0	3–0	2–1	—	1–3	1–0	1–0	3–3	3–2
Sportul Studențesc București	1–1	1–0	1–0	0–1	3–1	2–0	4–1	1–1	4–1	1–1	5–0	0–0	1–0	—	0–3	1–0	2–1	1–1
Steaua București	4–1	1–2	2–1	4–1	4–1	2–0	1–0	2–1	4–0	4–1	3–1	2–0	1–1	0–1	—	2–0	3–1	2–0
Politehnica Timișoara	3–1	2–0	0–1	1–1	2–1	3–1	1–1	0–1	0–2	3–0	1–2	2–0	2–0	2–1	1–0	—	2–0	1–0
Târgoviște	2–1	1–0	0–0	2–0	1–0	2–0	0–1	1–2	3–1	2–0	3–1	1–0	4–1	3–0	2–1	1–0	—	2–0
UTA Arad	2–0	3–1	1–1	4–1	3–0	3–1	1–0	1–3	0–1	3–0	0–0	6–2	3–0	1–0	1–3	1–0	1–1	—

Source: LT (in Romanian)
Legend: Blue = home team win; Yellow = draw; Red = away team win.

== Top goalscorers ==
Position	Player	Club	Goals
1	Marin Radu	Argeș Pitești	22
2	Constantin Stan	Gloria Buzău	16
3	Rodion Cămătaru	Universitatea Craiova	13
3	Emerich Dembrovschi	Politehnica Timișoara	13
3	Andrei Fănici	ASA Târgu Mureș	13
3	Dudu Georgescu	Dinamo București	13
3	Marcel Răducanu	Steaua București	13

== Champion squad ==
Argeș Pitești

Goalkeepers: Andrei Speriatu (17 / 0); Cristian Gheorghe (17 / 0).
Defenders: Mihai Zamfir (33 / 2); Constantin Stancu (34 / 1); Constantin Cârstea (31 / 0); Petre Ivan (34 / 1); Sergiu Moisescu (2 / 0); Iulian Ionașcu (1 / 0).
Midfielders: Ilie Bărbulescu (30 / 1); Gheorghe Chivescu (26 / 0); Doru Toma (32 / 1); Sevastian Iovănescu (32 / 7); Viorel Moiceanu (20 / 5); Mihail Iatan (17 / 1).
Forwards: Doru Nicolae (33 / 4); Marin Radu (29 / 22); Nicolae Dobrin (22 / 9); Viorel Turcu (7 / 0); Nicolae Radu (11 / 0).
(league appearances and goals listed in brackets)

Manager: Florin Halagian.

== See also ==
- 1978–79 Divizia B
- 1978–79 Divizia C
- 1978–79 County Championship
