= Cristian Gheorghe =

Romanian footballer

Personal information
- Date of birth: 10 September 1956 (age 70)
- Place of birth: Bucharest, Romania
- Height: 1.89 m (6 ft 2 in)
- Position: Goalkeeper

Youth career
- 1970–1972: Autobuzul București
- 1972–1974: Argeș Pitești

Senior career*
Years	Team	Apps	(Gls)
1974–1986	Argeș Pitești	272	(0)
1986–1988	Sportul Studențesc București	51	(0)
1988	Argeș Pitești	0	(0)
1989–1991	Gloria Bistrița (Note: The statistics for the 1988–89 and 1989–90 Divizia B seasons are unavailable.)	1	(0)
Total		324	(0)

International career
1977–1981	Romania	14	(0)

Managerial career
- 1999–2001: Dacia Pitești
- * Club domestic league appearances and goals

Cristian Gheorghe (born 10 September 1956) is a Romanian former football goalkeeper and manager.

== Club career ==
Gheorghe was born on 10 September 1956 in Bucharest, Romania and began playing junior-level football in 1970 at local club Autobuzul, moving two years later to Argeș Pitești. On 20 October 1974 he made his Divizia A debut under coach Florin Halagian, as The White-Purples defeated with 5–0 Sportul Studențesc București. In the 1978–79 season, Gheorghe helped Argeș win the title, being used by Halagian in 17 games, having to compete to be first-choice goalkeeper with Andrei Speriatu. In the following season they got past AEK Athens in the first round of the 1979–80 European Cup, where he kept a clean sheet in their 3–0 victory in the first leg, but the team got eliminated in the following round by title holders and eventual winners, Nottingham Forest.

In 1986, Gheorghe joined Sportul Studențesc. There, he played four games in the 1987–88 UEFA Cup campaign where in the second round they eliminated Peter Schmeichel and Brian Laudrup's Brøndby, winning the second leg 3–0 after an away loss by the same score, securing a historic penalty shootout qualification to the third round where they were defeated by Hellas Verona.

In 1988, Gheorghe returned to Argeș for a short while, but did not play in any league games. Subsequently, he moved to Divizia B club Gloria Bistrița, which he helped earn promotion to the first league at the end of the 1989–90 season. On 23 September 1990, he made his last Divizia A appearance in Gloria's 5–2 away loss to Universitatea Craiova, totaling 324 matches in the competition and 17 games in European competitions.

== International career ==
Gheorghe played 14 games for Romania, making his debut on 16 April 1977 under coach Ștefan Kovács, keeping a clean sheet in a 1–0 home win over Spain in the 1978 World Cup qualifiers. He played two more games in the same competition, keeping another clean sheet in a 2–0 away victory over Yugoslavia, but conceded two goals in a loss during the second leg against Spain. Afterwards he played three games in the Euro 1980 qualifiers, managing to not concede goals in home wins against Cyprus and Norway. Gheorghe's last two games for the national team were in the 1982 World Cup qualifiers, keeping a clean sheet in a 0–0 draw against rivals Hungary and conceding two goals in a loss to Switzerland.

== Coaching career ==
From 1999 until 2001, Gheorghe coached Dacia Pitești in Divizia B. He mostly worked at Argeș Pitești's Center for Children and Juniors, forming players such as Nicolae Dică, Andrei Mărgăritescu and Leonard Manole.

== Honours ==
Argeș Pitești

- Divizia A: 1978–79

Gloria Bistrița

- Divizia B: 1989–90
