= Helmántico Stadium =

Football stadium in Salamanca, Spain

Estadio Helmántico Helmántico Stadium
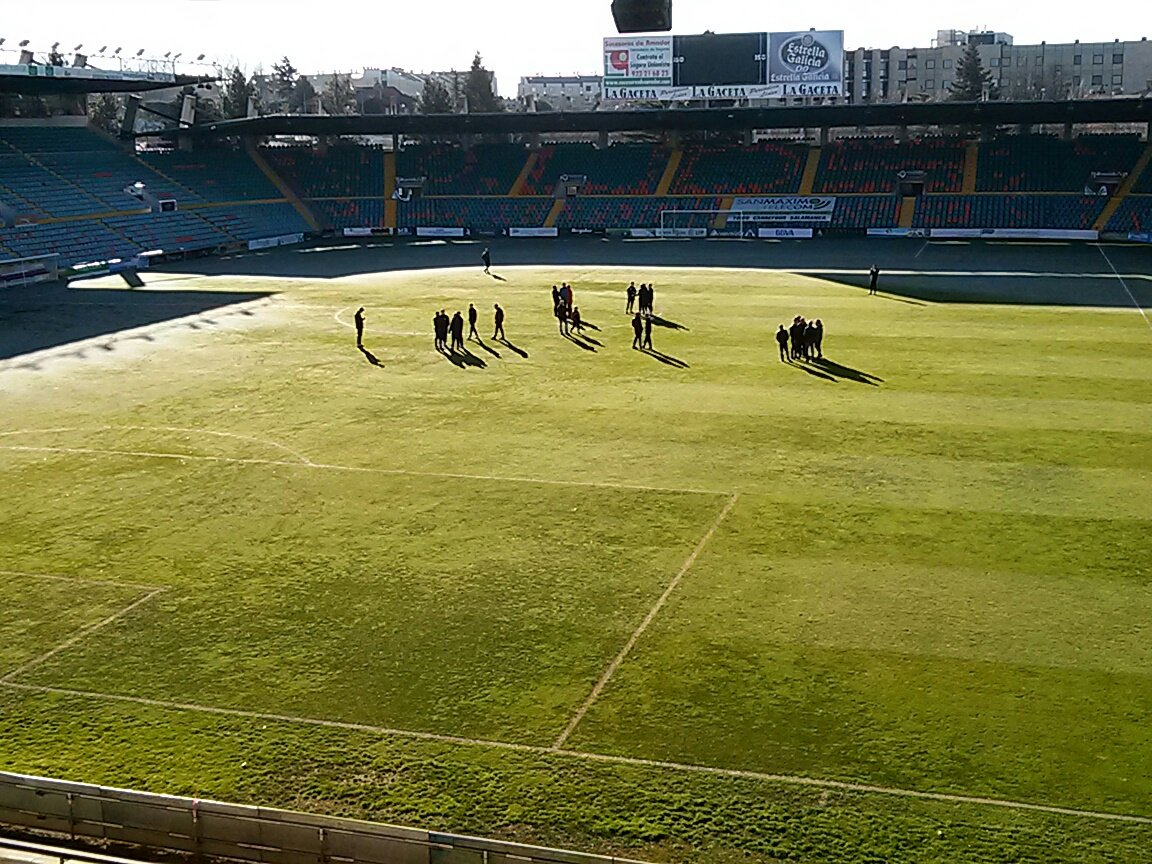
- Interactive map of Estadio Helmántico; Helmántico Stadium
- Location: Villares de la Reina, Salamanca, Spain
- Coordinates: 40°59′43″N 5°39′54″W
- Owner: Desarrollos Empresariales Deportivos, S.L.
- Capacity: 17,341
- Field size: 105 metres (115 yd) x 70 metres (77 yd)

Construction
- Opened: 1970
- Architects: Antonio García; Fernando Población

Tenants
- UD Salamanca (1970–2013); Salamanca CF UDS (2016–present); Spain national football team (selected matches)

Estadio Helmántico (English: Helmántico Stadium) is a football stadium in Villares de la Reina, Salamanca, Spain where UD Salamanca played home matches, and is the home stadium of Salamanca CF UDS. The stadium holds 17,341 and was built in 1970. It is located in the municipality of Villares de la Reina, on the outskirts of the city of Salamanca.

The Stadium also has a mini-stadium where the team usually trains and once a year hosts an international athletic championship. They are officially called "Javier Sotomayor", for Javier Sotomayor who set the world record in high jump there, but they are popularly called "Pistas del Helmántico". This second stadium hosts the matches of Salamanca CF UDS B.

In addition, there are also some swimming pools and tennis courts.

After the dissolution of UD Salamanca in 2013, the stadium went up for auction, finally being acquired by Desarrollos Empresariales Deportivos S.L., that allowed its use to CF Salmantino.

== Gallery ==
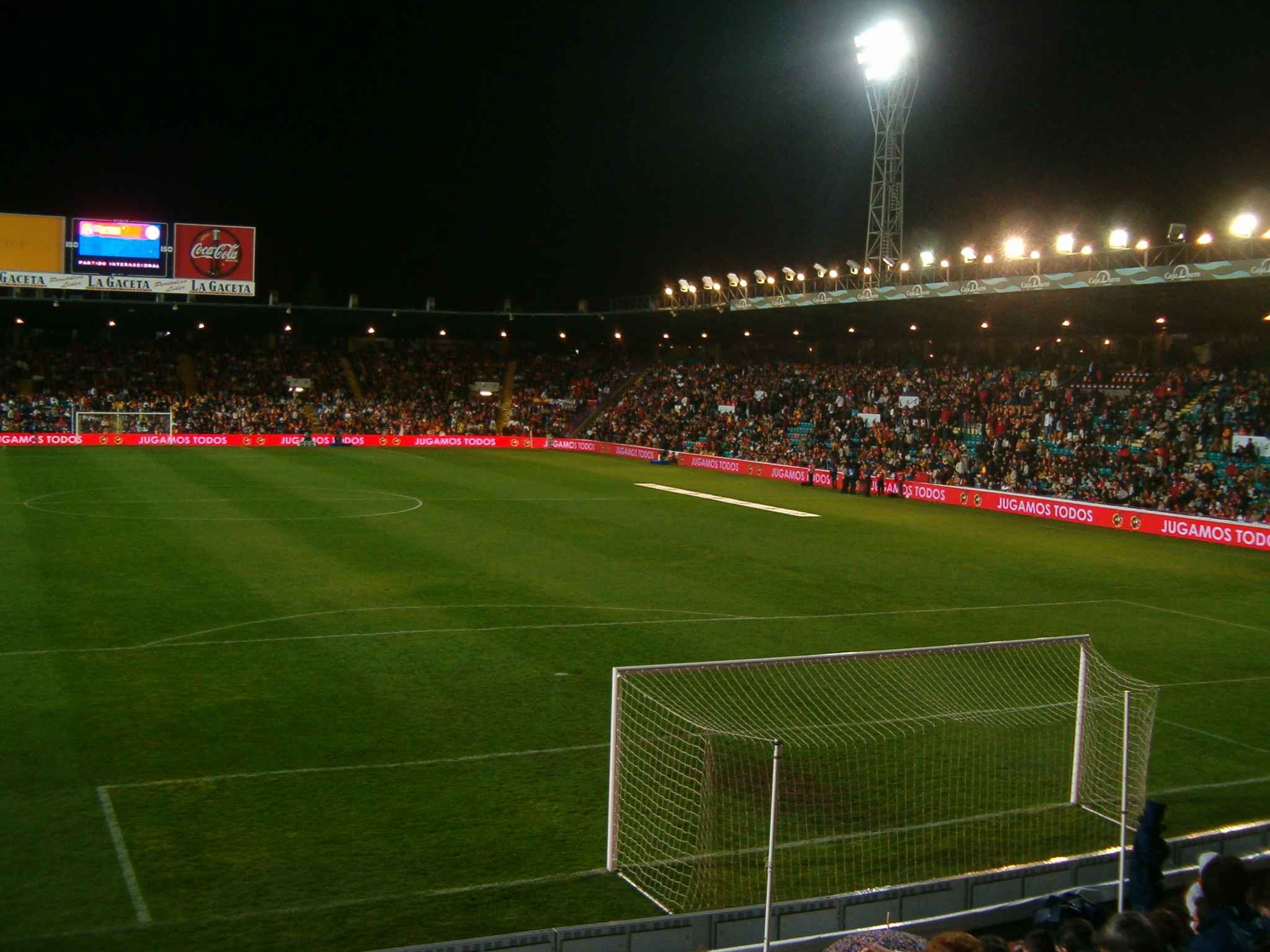
Spain–China in 2005.

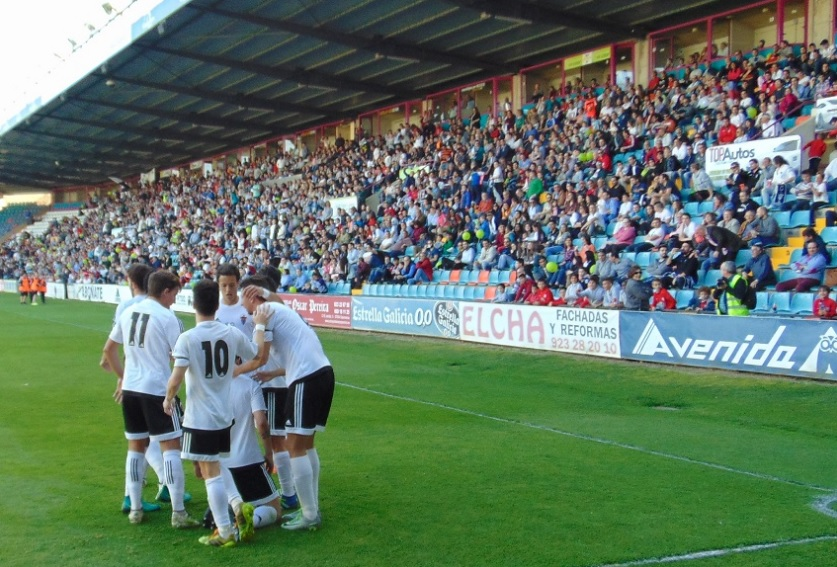
Players of Salmantino, celebrating a goal in 2017.

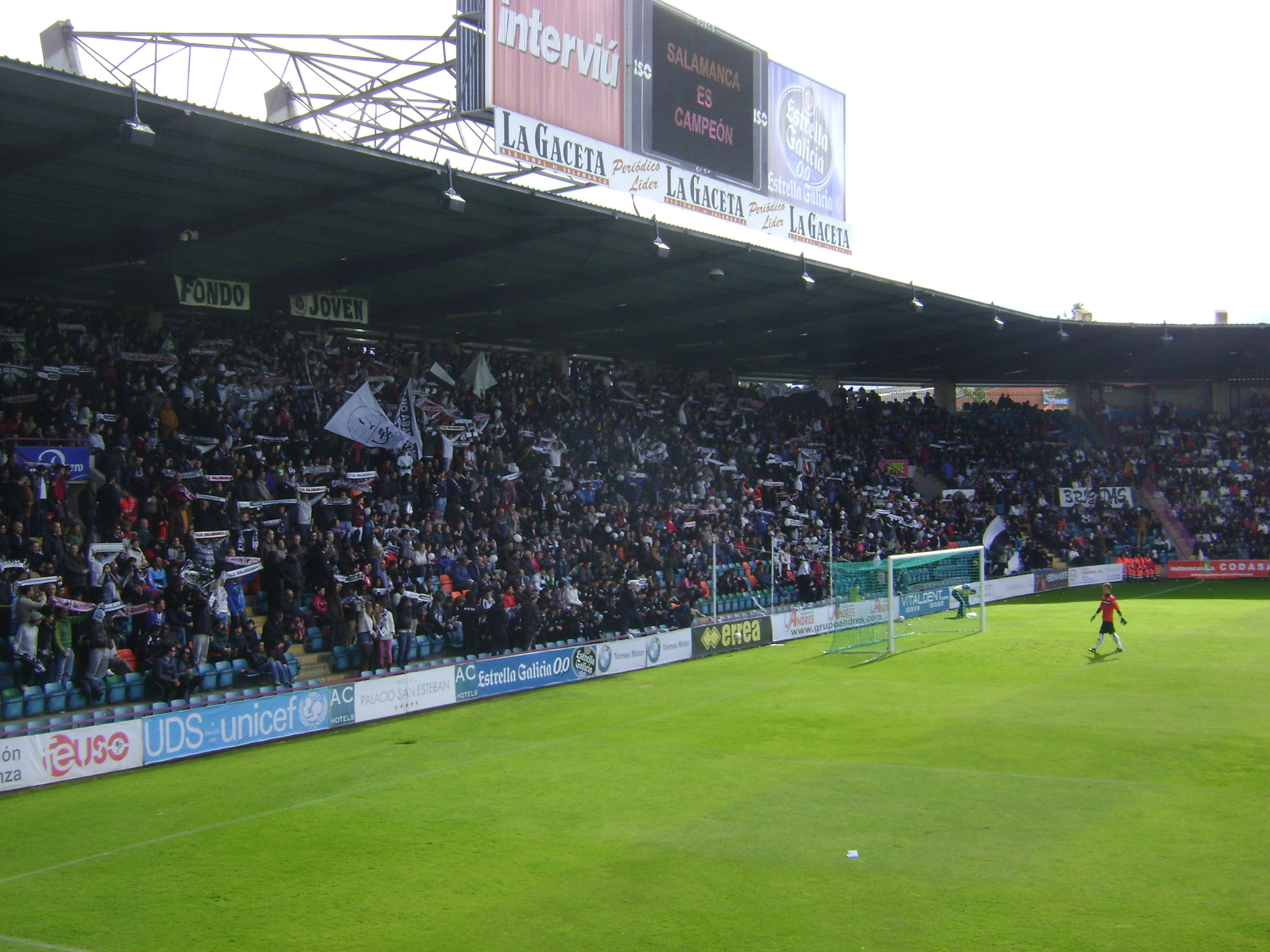
UD Salamanca supporters.

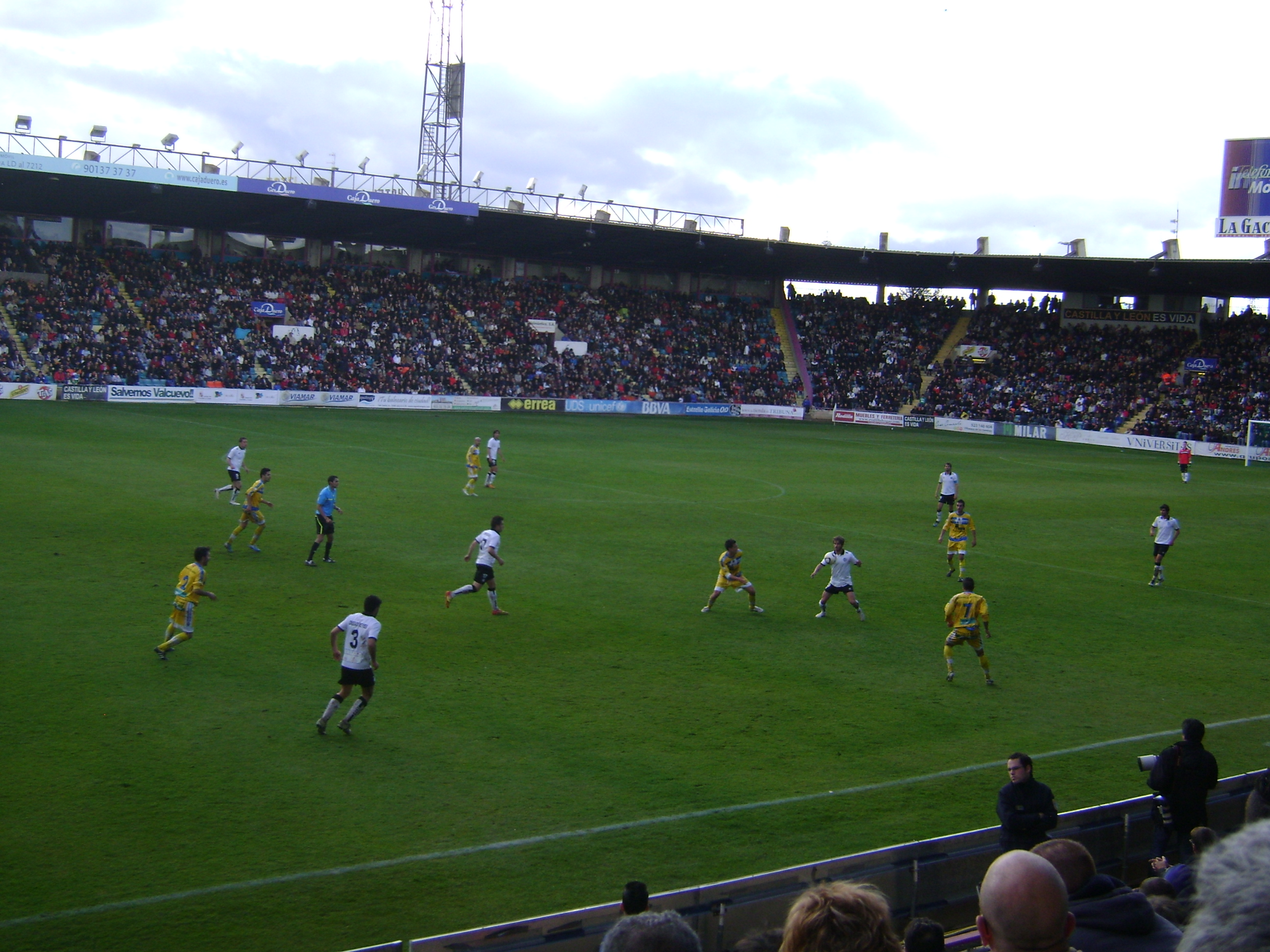
UD Salamanca game.

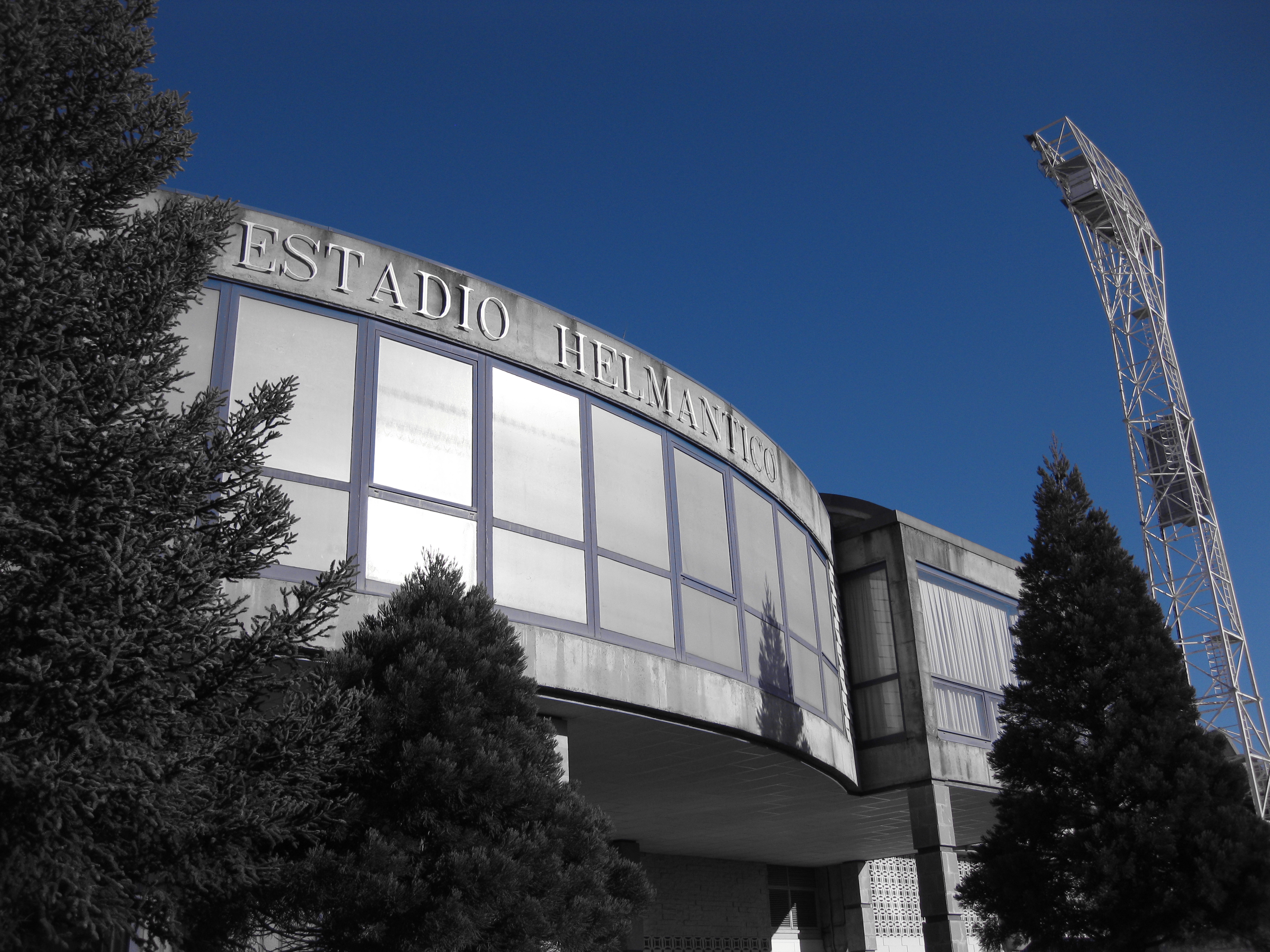
External view.
