= Petros Konnafis =

Cypriot footballer (born 1979)

Personal information
- Full name: Petros Konnafis
- Date of birth: August 28, 1979 (age 47)
- Place of birth: Nicosia, Cyprus
- Height: 1.90 m (6 ft 3 in)
- Position: Defender

Senior career*
Years	Team	Apps	(Gls)
1996–2002	AC Omonia	74	(5)
2002–2004	Anorthosis	45	(3)
2004	KAA Gent	6	(0)
2004–2007	AC Omonia	73	(6)
2007–2008	Apollon	0	(0)
2009	Olympiakos Nicosia	0	(0)

International career
2000–2003	Cyprus	25	(0)
- * Club domestic league appearances and goals

Petros Konnafis (born August 28, 1979) is a Cypriot former football defender who played for Apollon Limassol. His former teams are AC Omonia, Anorthosis Famagusta and KAA Gent. Konnafis was played many friendly games with Aris Thessaloniki on 1999, but AC Omonia blocked his transfer to Aris. He also briefly signed with Olympiakos Nicosia in 2009, but after training realised that he cannot continue playing competitively and decided to retire due to an old injury. Now he is a football agent.

His all-time highest market value was 200,000 euros.
