= Andrei Mărgăritescu =

Romanian footballer

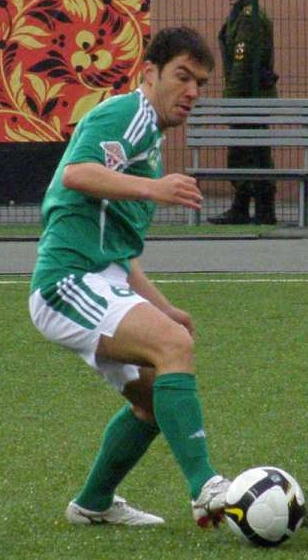
- Mărgăritescu playing for FC Terek in 2009

Personal information
- Full name: Andrei Silviu Mărgăritescu
- Date of birth: 1 January 1980 (age 46)
- Place of birth: Pitești, Romania
- Height: 1.75 m (5 ft 9 in)
- Position: Defensive midfielder

Youth career
- Argeș Pitești
- –1999: Rapid București

Senior career*
| Years | Team | Apps | (Gls) |
| 1999–2002 | Rapid București | 11 | (0) |
| 2000–2002 | → Tractorul Brașov (loan) | 51 | (7) |
| 2002–2003 | Olimpia Satu Mare | 25 | (0) |
| 2003–2004 | Unirea Focșani | 25 | (3) |
| 2004–2008 | Dinamo București | 106 | (5) |
| 2008–2009 | Terek Grozny | 33 | (0) |
| 2010–2011 | Dinamo București | 23 | (0) |
| 2011–2013 | Mioveni | 21 | (0) |
| 2014 | Atletic Bradu | 16 | (0) |
| 2014–2015 | Urban Titu | 1 | (0) |
| 2015 | SCM Pitești | | |
| Total | | 312 | (15) |

International career
| 2006–2007 | Romania | 3 | (0) |

Managerial career
- 2023–2024: Mioveni (assistant)
- * Club domestic league appearances and goals

Andrei Silviu Margaritescu (born 1 January 1980) is a former Romanian professional footballer who played as a defensive midfielder.

== Club career ==
Mărgăritescu, nicknamed China, was born in Pitești on 1 January 1980 and began playing junior-level football at local club Argeș, where he worked with coach Cristian Gheorghe. He made his Divizia A debut at age 19 on 2 November 1999, playing for Rapid București under coach Mircea Lucescu in a 2–1 victory over FC Brașov. After receiving a red card in a game against Steaua București, Lucescu gave him the captain's armband in the following game in order to make him more responsible and less aggressive in his play.

After only one season at Rapid, Mărgăritescu went to play four seasons in Divizia B for Tractorul Brașov, Olimpia Satu Mare and Unirea Focșani. Subsequently, he returned to Divizia A football as he was signed by Dinamo București where he was recommended by Lucescu and a coach from his youth career Ionuț Chirilă. With The Red Dogs he managed to win the only trophies of his career. The first two were under coach Ioan Andone, starting with the 2004–05 Cupa României when he played the full 90 minutes in the 1–0 victory against Farul Constanța in the final. The second was the 2005 Supercupa României as he played the entire match in the 3–2 victory against rivals Steaua București. Andone also used him in seven games during the 2005–06 UEFA Cup campaign when the team eliminated Everton with a historical 5–2 on aggregate, reaching the group stage. Afterwards, he helped Dinamo win the 2006–07 Liga I title, being used by coach Mircea Rednic in 31 games in which he scored one goal. In the same season, the team reached the round of 32 in the UEFA Cup where they were eliminated with 3–1 on aggregate by Benfica, Mărgăritescu playing 11 games in the campaign. Subsequently, Dinamo aimed to reach the 2007–08 Champions League group stage, with Mărgăritescu playing in the second leg of the third qualifying round against Lazio Roma, which was eventually lost with 4–2 on aggregate.

In 2008, Mărgăritescu went to play alongside fellow Romanians Florentin Petre and Daniel Pancu in Russia for Terek Grozny. He made his Russian Premier League debut on 13 July 2008 when coach Vyacheslav Hroznyi used him as a starter in a 0–0 draw against FC Moscow. He returned to Dinamo in December 2009, where he stayed for one and a half years. During the 2011–12 season spent at Mioveni, he made his last Divizia A appearances, totaling 156 matches with four goals in the competition and 29 games in European competitions. Mărgăritescu spent the last years of his career playing in the Romanian lower leagues for Mioveni, Atletic Bradu, Urban Titu and SCM Pitești.

== International career ==
Mărgăritescu played three matches for Romania in the Euro 2008 qualifiers, under coach Victor Pițurcă. He made his debut on 6 September 2006 when he substituted for Laurențiu Roșu in the 90th minute of a 2–0 away victory against Albania. His second game was a 2–0 away victory against Luxembourg and his final match was the second leg against Albania, a 6–1 home victory.

On 25 March 2008, Mărgăritescu was decorated by the president of Romania, Traian Băsescu, for his performance in the Euro 2008 qualifiers, where Romania managed to qualify to the final tournament. He received Medalia "Meritul Sportiv" – ("The Sportive Merit" Medal) class III.

=== International stats ===
Appearances and goals by national team and year
| National team | Year | Apps | Goals |
|---|---|---|---|
| Romania | 2006 | 1 | 0 |
| Romania | 2007 | 2 | 0 |
| Total | | 3 | 0 |

== Controversy ==
On 27 June 2014, Mărgăritescu received a three-year suspended sentence for buying a car, knowing it was stolen.

== Honours ==
Rapid București

- Supercupa României: 1999

Dinamo București

- Liga I: 2006–07
- Cupa României: 2004–05
- Supercupa României: 2005
