= Villares de la Reina =

- Municipality
- Flag Coat of arms

- Location in Salamanca
- Coordinates: 41°00′N 5°38′W
- Country: Spain
- Autonomous community: Castile and León
- Province: Salamanca
- Comarca: La Armuña

Government
  - Mayor: José Martín Méndez (People's Party)

Area
  - Total: 22 km^{2} (8.5 sq mi)
- Elevation: 818 m (2,684 ft)

Population (2025-01-01)
  - Total: 6,784
  - Density: 310/km^{2} (800/sq mi)
- Time zone: UTC+1 (CET)
  - Summer (DST): UTC+2 (CEST)
- Postal code: 37184
- Website: villaresdelareina.es

Villares de la Reina is a municipality in the province of Salamanca, western Spain, part of the autonomous community of Castile-Leon, on the outskirts of Salamanca city. As of 2016 it has a population of 6,266 people.

== Geography ==
The municipality covers an area of 22 km².

It lies 818 meters above sea level.

The postal code is 37184.

== See also ==
List of municipalities in Salamanca
