= Steaua București in European football =

Professional football club performances

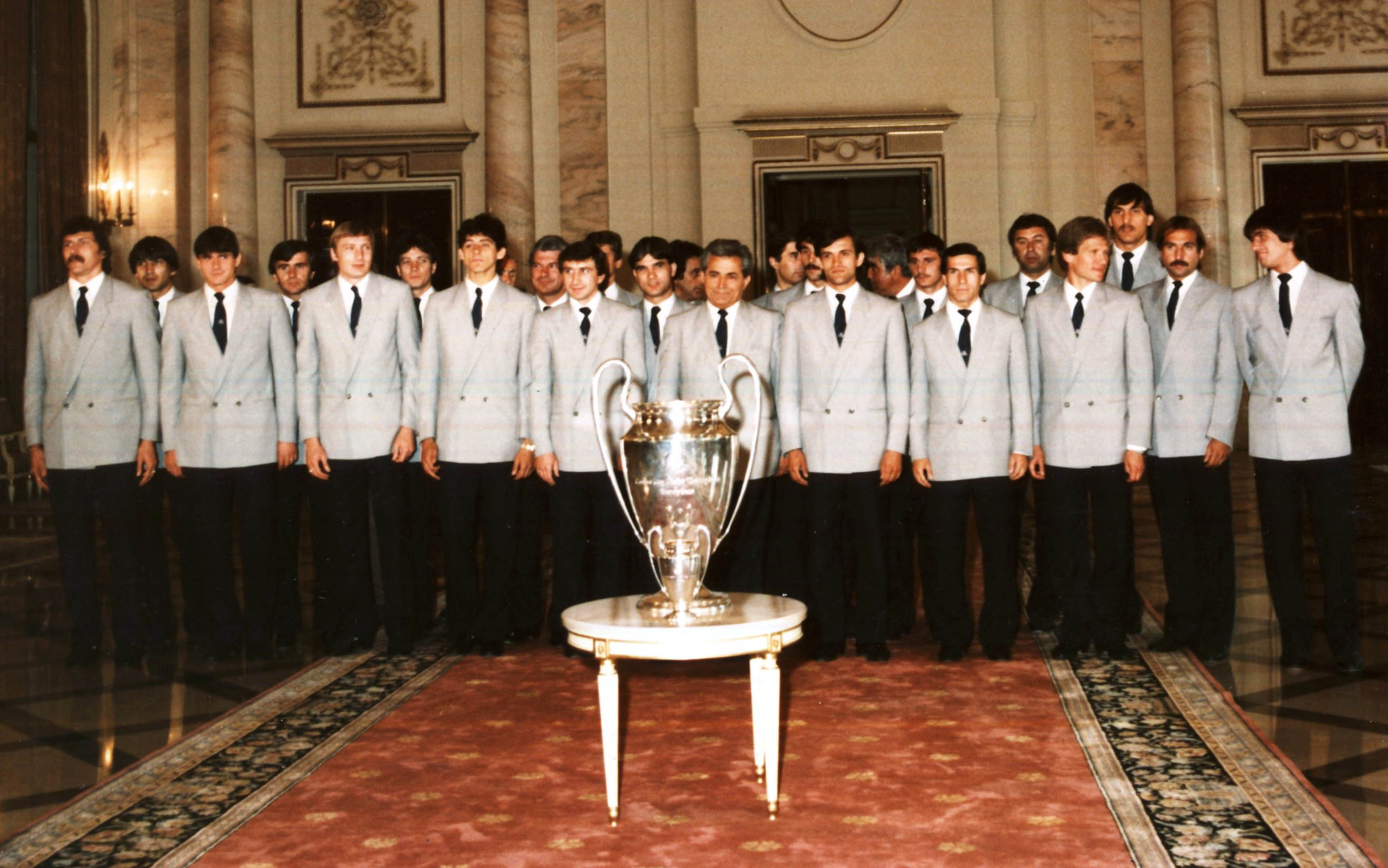
- Steaua team with the European Cup in 1986.
- First entry: 1957–58 European Cup
- Latest entry: 2026–27 UEFA Conference League

Titles
- Champions League: 1 (1986)
- Super Cup: 1 (1986)

Romanian professional football club Steaua, based in Bucharest, has regularly taken part in Union of European Football Associations (UEFA) competitions. Qualification for Romanian clubs is determined by a team's performance in its domestic league and cup competitions. Steaua has regularly qualified for the primary European competition, the European Cup, by winning the Liga I. Steaua has also achieved European qualification via the Cupa României and played in both the former UEFA Cup Winners' Cup and the UEFA Cup.

Steaua's first match in European competition was in the 1957–58 European Cup against Borussia Dortmund of West Germany. So far, they have competed 28 times in the European Champions' Cup / Champions League, 21 times in the UEFA Cup / Europa League, 11 times in the Cup Winners' Cup, 2 times in the UEFA Europa Conference League, 1 time in the UEFA Super Cup, and 1 in the Intercontinental Cup. There were five consecutive participations in the European Cup during the 1980s and six in the 1990s. Since 2003, Steaua is a regular appearance in the UEFA competitions. As of September 2018, it has 14 consecutive seasons of European Cup participations.

Steaua won the European Cup in 1986, becoming the only Romanian and the first Eastern European club to do so, by defeating Barcelona in a penalty shoot-out. They reached the European Cup final again in 1989, but lost 4–0 to Milan. Steaua Bucharest's record wins in Europe are a 6–0 victory over Young Boys in the 1979–80 European Cup Winners' Cup and a 6–0 victory over AaB Aalborg in a home match in the group stage of the 2014–15 UEFA Europa League.

This article also includes Steaua Bucharest's European participation as FCSB, named as such since 2017 due to the FC Steaua București records dispute.

== European competitions ==
The first continental competition organised by UEFA was the European Cup in 1955. It is the most prestigious European competition and was conceived by the editor of L'Équipe Gabriel Hanot, as a competition for winners of the European national football leagues. The format of the competition was changed for the 1992–93 season to include a group stage instead of the straight knockout format previously in use. The competition was also renamed as the UEFA Champions League. Further changes were made for the 1997–98 season, with the runners-up from countries placed highly in the UEFA coefficients allowed to enter. This was later expanded to four team for the top countries in the coefficients.

A number of other European competitions have also taken place. The secondary cup competition is the UEFA Cup, which was established in 1972. The competition was initially open to teams who finished as runners-up in their respective national leagues. This was later expanded based on the countries rank in the coefficients and performance in domestic cup competitions. The competition was renamed as the UEFA Europa League for the 2009–10 season. The UEFA Cup Winners' Cup was a competition for the winners of all European domestic cup competitions. Established in 1960 it was considered the secondary cup competitions until the re-branding of the European Cup, which weakened the competition and it was considered the weakest of the three competitions. The competition was discontinued in 1999 and amalgamated into the UEFA Cup.

The UEFA Super Cup is a competition between the winners of the Champions League and Europa League. It was contested between the winners of the Champions League and Cup Winners' Cup up until the discontinuation of the latter in 1999. The competition was originally held over two-legs but was changed to a single match in 1998. The Inter-Cities Fairs Cup was established in 1955 and run independently of UEFA. It was initially for team from cities that hosted trade fairs, it was later expanded to include runners-up from the domestic leagues. In 1971, it came under the control of UEFA and was re-branded as the UEFA Cup. Established in 1960 the Intercontinental Cup was a competition for the winners of the European Cup and the South American equivalent the Copa Libertadores. Jointly organised by UEFA and the Confederación Sudamericana de Fútbol (CONMEBOL) it was contested until 2004, when it was replaced by the FIFA Club World Cup which included the winners of all six confederations regional championships.

== History ==
=== Under communism (1947–1989) ===
On 7 June 1947, at the initiative of several officers of the Romanian Royal House, the first Romanian sports club of the Army was born through a decree signed by General Mihail Lascăr, High Commander of the Romanian Royal Army. The club was to be called ASA București (Asociația Sportivă a Armatei București – English: Army Sports Association), with seven different sections (football, fencing, volleyball, boxing, shooting, athletics, tennis), and its leadership was entrusted to General-Major Oreste Alexandrescu. With a squad gathered in record time, ASA was preparing itself for the Romanian second league promotion play-offs. However, the new Communist government that had come to power in 1945 and assumed total control of the country at the end of 1947 stated that every sports association in the country was now to be linked to a certain trade union, be it a State Department, a Ministry or a company. However, this was not the case for first league club, Carmen București, owned by wealthy industrialist Dumitru Mociorniță, who saw his team excluded from the championship and later on dissolved, its place in the 1st league being now taken by newly formed ASA.

The team's first official competition was the 1947–48 Romanian Football Championship season, in which they finished 14th. Their first official match was played in Bucharest against Dermata Cluj and ended 0-0. The team managed to avoid relegation after a play-out with seven other teams. On 5 June 1948, by Order 289 of the Ministry of National Defence, ASA became CSCA (Clubul Sportiv Central al Armatei – English: Central Sports Club of the Army), after which performances began to roll. In March 1950, CSCA changed its name to CCA (Casa Centrală a Armatei, English: "Central House of the Army").

The 1950s were years of great domestic performances, ones in which the famous "CCA Golden Team" was formed. 1956 was one of CCA's most prestigious years, when, apart from winning the title, the team entered a tournament in England where they defeated Luton Town 4–3, drew against Arsenal 1–1 and Sheffield Wednesday 3–3, then lost 5–0 to Wolverhampton Wanderers. Further, on 22 April 1956, the Romania national team defeated Yugoslavia 1–0 in Belgrade with a team comprised only by CCA players. In 1957, the team also made their first European Cup appearance, falling to Borussia Dortmund after a play-off in Bologna.

In 1961, CCA changed its name once again (for the final time) to CSA Steaua București (Clubul Sportiv al Armatei Steaua – English: Army Sports Club Steaua). The word "steaua" is Romanian for "the star" and was adopted because of the presence, just like in any other Eastern-European Army team, of a red star on their badge.

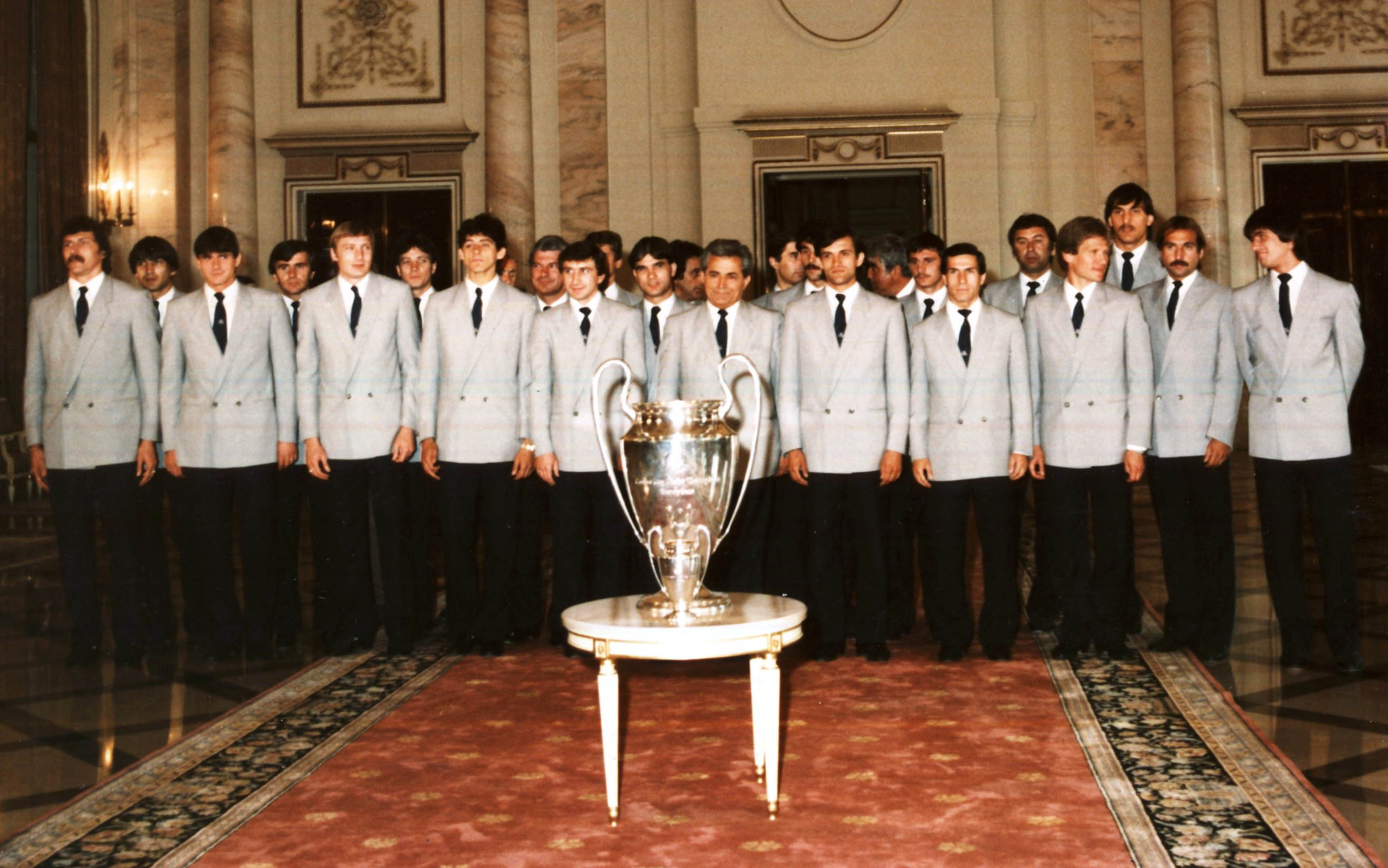
The Steaua squad with the European Cup after victory in the 1986 European Cup Final.

Under the leadership of coaches Emerich Jenei and Anghel Iordănescu, Steaua had an impressive Championship run in the 1984–85 season, which they eventually won after a six-year drought. What followed was an astonishing European Cup season. After knocking-out Vejle Boldklub, Budapest Honvéd, Lahti and Anderlecht, they were the first ever Romanian team to make it into a Champions League final. On 7 May 1986, at the Ramón Sánchez Pizjuán Stadium in Seville, Spanish champions Barcelona were clear favourites, but after a goalless draw, goalkeeper Helmut Duckadam saved all four penalties taken by Barça, being the first ever Romanian to reach the Guinness Book for that achievement, while Gavril Balint and Marius Lăcătuș converted their penalties to make Steaua the first Eastern European team to win the supreme continental trophy.

Gheorghe Hagi, arguably the all-time best Romanian footballer, joined the club a few months later, scoring the only goal of the match against Dynamo Kyiv which brought Steaua an additional European Super Cup on 24 February 1987 in Monaco, just two months after having lost the Intercontinental Cup 1–0 to Argentinians River Plate in Tokyo.

Steaua remained at the top of European football for the rest of the decade, managing one more Champions League semi-final against Benfica (1987–88) and one more Champions League final in 1989, which was lost 4–0 in to the Milan side of Marco van Basten, Ruud Gullit and Frank Rijkaard.

During these last years of the Communist regime in Romania, dictator Nicolae Ceaușescu's son Valentin was involved in the life of the team. Even though a controversial character, Valentin Ceaușescu admitted in a recent interview he had done nothing else than to protect his favourite team from Dinamo București's sphere of influence, ensured by the Ministry of Internal Affairs. Though contested by some, their five-year winning streak in the championship between 1984–85 and 1988–89 corroborates the notion that the team was really the best during this period.

=== Post-Revolution (1990–present) ===
The Romanian Revolution led the country towards a free open market and, subsequently, several players of the great 1980s team left for other clubs in the West. Gheorghe Hagi joined Real Madrid for a then club record $4.3 million fee, Marius Lăcătuș to Fiorentina, Dan Petrescu to Foggia, Silviu Lung to Logroñés, Ștefan Iovan to Brighton & Hove Albion, Tudorel Stoica to Lens and so on.

Therefore, three years followed in which the club won only a national cup in the 1991–92 season. However, a swift recovery followed and Steaua managed a six consecutive championship streak between 1992–93 and 1997–98. The club managed to reach the UEFA Cup Winners' Cup quarter-finals in 1993, when they lost on away goals to Royal Antwerp, and also qualified for the Champions League group stage for three-straight years between 1994–95 and 1996–97.

In 1998, following lobbying from football department president Marcel Pușcaș and new LPF regulations, the football club separated from CSA Steaua București and changed their name for the final time to AFC Steaua București (Asociația Fotbal Club Steaua București).

In the summer of 2004, following a third consecutive year with no trophy won, former Italy goalkeeper Walter Zenga was appointed as head coach, becoming the first ever foreign FC FCSB manager. Following the appointment, results came immediately, as the team qualified for the UEFA Cup group stage and further on became the first Romanian team to make it to the European football spring since 1993, where they defeated holders Valencia after a penalty shoot-out at Ghencea. Zenga was sacked with three matchdays to go in the Divizia A, but FC FCSB eventually won the title, performance repeated the following year with manager Cosmin Olăroiu. Under Olăroiu they reached the UEFA Cup semi-finals in 2005–06, where they were eliminated by Middlesbrough by a last minute goal. This was their best performance at a European competition since reaching the final of the 1988–89 European Cup.

The next season, after having successfully passed two qualifying rounds against Gorica and Standard Liège, FC FCSB reached the group stage of the 2006–07 UEFA Champions League, where they finished in third position in Group E, behind Lyon (0–3 home, 1–1 away) and Real Madrid (1–4 home, 0–1 away) and in front of Dynamo Kyiv (1–1 home, 4–1 away). However, their continuation in the UEFA Cup was short, having been eliminated by title holders Sevilla in the round of 32.

In the 2007–08 UEFA Champions League, they eliminated Zagłębie Lubin (1–0 away and 2–1 home) and BATE Borisov (2–2 away and 2–0 home) to reach the group stage, where they were drawn alongside Arsenal, Sevilla and Sparta Prague. However, their performance was sub-par, finishing last with one point.

The 2008–09 UEFA Champions League season saw FC FCSB advance to the group stage after defeating Galatasaray (2–2 away and 1–0 home), only to again finish in last place with one point, after Bayern Munich, Lyon and Fiorentina.

The 2012–13 season saw FC FCSB achieve their best European performance in six seasons, reaching the 2012–13 UEFA Europa League Round of 16 where they lost to eventual winners Chelsea. Steaua most recently qualified for the Champions League group stages in 2013–14, finishing last in their group with Chelsea, Schalke and Basel.

== Total statistics ==
Updated 30 July 2026.

| Competition | S | Pld | W | D | L | GF | GA | GD |
|---|---|---|---|---|---|---|---|---|
| UEFA Champions League / European Cup | 30 | 154 | 56 | 42 | 56 | 224 | 216 | +8 |
| UEFA Super Cup / European Super Cup | 1 | 1 | 1 | 0 | 0 | 1 | 0 | +1 |
| UEFA Europa League / UEFA Cup | 23 | 170 | 71 | 44 | 56 | 237 | 210 | +27 |
| UEFA Europa Conference League | 4 | 20 | 7 | 3 | 10 | 22 | 37 | −15 |
| UEFA Cup Winners' Cup / European Cup Winners' Cup | 11 | 40 | 14 | 12 | 14 | 51 | 54 | −3 |
| Intercontinental Cup | 1 | 1 | 0 | 0 | 1 | 0 | 1 | −1 |
| Total | 70 | 386 | 149 | 101 | 136 | 534 | 516 | +18 |

== Statistics by country ==
As of 30 July 2026

| Country | Club | Pld | W | D | L | GF | GA | GD |
|---|---|---|---|---|---|---|---|---|
| Andorra | Inter Club d'Escaldes | 2 | 1 | 0 | 1 | 4 | 3 | +1 |
| Subtotal | | 2 | 1 | 0 | 1 | 4 | 3 | +1 |
| Argentina | River Plate | 1 | 0 | 0 | 1 | 0 | 1 | –1 |
| Subtotal | | 1 | 0 | 0 | 1 | 0 | 1 | –1 |
| Armenia | Alashkert | 2 | 1 | 0 | 1 | 5 | 3 | +2 |
| Armenia | Shirak | 1 | 1 | 0 | 0 | 3 | 0 | +3 |
| Subtotal | | 3 | 2 | 0 | 1 | 8 | 3 | +5 |
| Austria | Austria Wien | 4 | 2 | 1 | 1 | 4 | 3 | +1 |
| Austria | LASK | 5 | 4 | 1 | 0 | 8 | 3 | +5 |
| Austria | Rapid Wien | 2 | 1 | 0 | 1 | 3 | 4 | –1 |
| Austria | Red Bull Salzburg | 2 | 1 | 1 | 0 | 1 | 0 | +1 |
| Subtotal | | 11 | 7 | 2 | 2 | 14 | 9 | +5 |
| Azerbaijan | Qarabağ FK | 1 | 1 | 0 | 0 | 3 | 2 | +1 |
| Subtotal | | 1 | 1 | 0 | 0 | 3 | 2 | +1 |
| Belarus | BATE Borisov | 2 | 1 | 1 | 0 | 4 | 2 | +2 |
| Belarus | Neman Grodno | 2 | 0 | 2 | 0 | 1 | 1 | 0 |
| Subtotal | | 4 | 1 | 3 | 0 | 5 | 3 | +2 |
| Belgium | Anderlecht | 8 | 2 | 4 | 2 | 7 | 7 | 0 |
| Belgium | Antwerp | 2 | 0 | 2 | 0 | 1 | 1 | 0 |
| Belgium | Club Brugge | 4 | 1 | 2 | 1 | 7 | 5 | +2 |
| Belgium | Standard Liège | 5 | 2 | 2 | 1 | 8 | 6 | +2 |
| Subtotal | | 19 | 5 | 10 | 4 | 23 | 19 | +4 |
| Bulgaria | Botev Plovdiv | 2 | 1 | 0 | 1 | 4 | 7 | –3 |
| Bulgaria | CSKA 1948 | 2 | 2 | 0 | 0 | 4 | 2 | +2 |
| Bulgaria | CSKA Sofia | 6 | 3 | 3 | 0 | 12 | 7 | +5 |
| Bulgaria | Ludogorets Razgrad | 2 | 1 | 0 | 1 | 1 | 1 | 0 |
| Subtotal | | 12 | 7 | 3 | 2 | 21 | 17 | +4 |
| Croatia / (Socialist Federal Republic of Yugoslavia) Yugoslavia | Dinamo Zagreb | 5 | 1 | 0 | 4 | 6 | 13 | –7 |
| Croatia / (Socialist Federal Republic of Yugoslavia) Yugoslavia | Hajduk Split | 4 | 2 | 1 | 1 | 6 | 3 | +3 |
| Subtotal | | 7 | 3 | 1 | 5 | 12 | 16 | –4 |
| Cyprus | AEK Larnaca | 2 | 1 | 1 | 0 | 4 | 2 | +2 |
| Cyprus | Anorthosis Famagusta | 2 | 1 | 1 | 0 | 4 | 3 | +1 |
| Cyprus | Omonia | 2 | 2 | 0 | 0 | 5 | 1 | +4 |
| Subtotal | | 6 | 4 | 2 | 0 | 13 | 6 | +7 |
| Czech Republic / Czechoslovakia | Mladá Boleslav | 2 | 1 | 1 | 0 | 1 | 0 | +1 |
| Czech Republic / Czechoslovakia | Slavia Prague | 4 | 0 | 2 | 2 | 4 | 8 | –4 |
| Czech Republic / Czechoslovakia | Slovan Liberec | 1 | 0 | 0 | 1 | 0 | 2 | –2 |
| Czech Republic / Czechoslovakia | Sparta Prague | 6 | 2 | 3 | 1 | 13 | 8 | +5 |
| Czech Republic / Czechoslovakia | Viktoria Plzeň | 4 | 2 | 1 | 1 | 9 | 5 | +4 |
| Subtotal | | 17 | 5 | 7 | 5 | 27 | 23 | +4 |
| Denmark | AaB | 2 | 1 | 0 | 1 | 6 | 1 | +5 |
| Denmark | AGF Aarhus | 2 | 1 | 0 | 1 | 4 | 4 | 0 |
| Denmark | Copenhagen | 2 | 1 | 1 | 0 | 2 | 1 | +1 |
| Denmark | Midtjylland | 1 | 1 | 0 | 0 | 2 | 0 | +2 |
| Denmark | Nordsjælland | 2 | 0 | 1 | 1 | 0 | 2 | −2 |
| Denmark | Silkeborg | 2 | 0 | 0 | 2 | 0 | 10 | −10 |
| Denmark | Vejle Boldklub | 2 | 1 | 1 | 0 | 5 | 2 | +3 |
| Subtotal | | 13 | 5 | 3 | 7 | 19 | 20 | −2 |
| England | Arsenal | 2 | 0 | 0 | 2 | 1 | 3 | –2 |
| England | Aston Villa | 2 | 1 | 0 | 1 | 2 | 3 | –1 |
| England | Chelsea | 4 | 1 | 0 | 3 | 2 | 8 | –6 |
| England | Liverpool | 4 | 0 | 2 | 2 | 3 | 7 | −4 |
| England | Manchester City | 2 | 0 | 0 | 2 | 0 | 6 | –6 |
| England | Manchester United | 1 | 0 | 0 | 1 | 0 | 2 | –2 |
| England | Middlesbrough | 2 | 1 | 0 | 1 | 3 | 4 | –1 |
| England | Southampton | 2 | 1 | 1 | 0 | 2 | 1 | +1 |
| England | West Ham United | 4 | 1 | 1 | 2 | 3 | 6 | −3 |
| Subtotal | | 23 | 5 | 4 | 14 | 16 | 40 | −24 |
| Estonia | Flora Tallinn | 2 | 1 | 0 | 1 | 5 | 4 | +1 |
| Estonia | Levadia Tallinn | 2 | 2 | 0 | 0 | 7 | 1 | +6 |
| Subtotal | | 4 | 3 | 0 | 1 | 12 | 5 | +7 |
| Finland | Kuusysi | 2 | 1 | 1 | 0 | 1 | 0 | +1 |
| Subtotal | | 2 | 1 | 1 | 0 | 1 | 0 | +1 |
| France | Bastia | 2 | 1 | 0 | 1 | 3 | 3 | 0 |
| France | Lens | 1 | 1 | 0 | 0 | 4 | 0 | +4 |
| France | Monaco | 4 | 2 | 0 | 2 | 4 | 7 | –3 |
| France | Montpellier | 2 | 0 | 0 | 2 | 0 | 8 | –8 |
| France | Nantes | 2 | 0 | 0 | 2 | 3 | 5 | –2 |
| France | Lyon | 6 | 0 | 1 | 5 | 5 | 18 | –13 |
| France | Paris Saint-Germain | 2 | 1 | 0 | 1 | 3 | 5 | –2 |
| France | Strasbourg | 2 | 0 | 1 | 1 | 1 | 2 | –1 |
| Subtotal | | 21 | 5 | 2 | 14 | 23 | 48 | –25 |
| (Georgia (country)) Georgia | Dinamo Tbilisi | 2 | 1 | 1 | 0 | 3 | 1 | +2 |
| (Georgia (country)) Georgia | Saburtalo Tbilisi | 2 | 1 | 0 | 1 | 4 | 3 | +1 |
| Subtotal | | 4 | 2 | 1 | 1 | 7 | 4 | +3 |
| Germany / West Germany | Bayern Munich | 4 | 0 | 2 | 2 | 1 | 5 | –4 |
| Germany / West Germany | Borussia Dortmund | 7 | 1 | 1 | 5 | 9 | 17 | –8 |
| Germany / West Germany | Hertha BSC | 1 | 0 | 1 | 0 | 0 | 0 | 0 |
| Germany / West Germany | TSG Hoffenheim | 1 | 0 | 1 | 0 | 0 | 0 | 0 |
| Germany / West Germany | Schalke 04 | 4 | 0 | 2 | 2 | 1 | 5 | –4 |
| Germany / West Germany | VfB Stuttgart | 2 | 0 | 1 | 1 | 3 | 7 | –4 |
| Subtotal | | 19 | 1 | 8 | 10 | 14 | 34 | –20 |
| Greece | Olympiacos | 1 | 0 | 1 | 0 | 0 | 0 | 0 |
| Greece | Panathinaikos | 2 | 0 | 1 | 1 | 5 | 8 | –3 |
| Greece | PAOK | 3 | 3 | 0 | 0 | 5 | 1 | +4 |
| Subtotal | | 6 | 3 | 2 | 1 | 10 | 9 | +1 |
| Hungary | Budapest Honvéd | 2 | 1 | 0 | 1 | 4 | 2 | +2 |
| Hungary | MTK Budapest | 2 | 1 | 0 | 1 | 4 | 2 | +2 |
| Hungary | Újpest | 2 | 2 | 0 | 0 | 4 | 1 | +3 |
| Subtotal | | 6 | 4 | 0 | 2 | 12 | 5 | +7 |
| Iceland | Fram Reykjavík | 2 | 2 | 0 | 0 | 5 | 0 | +5 |
| Subtotal | | 2 | 2 | 0 | 0 | 5 | 0 | +5 |
| Israel | Hapoel Be'er Sheva | 2 | 1 | 1 | 0 | 3 | 2 | +1 |
| Israel | Maccabi Haifa | 2 | 1 | 0 | 1 | 4 | 7 | –3 |
| Israel | Maccabi Tel Aviv | 2 | 1 | 1 | 0 | 2 | 1 | +1 |
| Subtotal | | 6 | 3 | 2 | 1 | 9 | 10 | –1 |
| Italy | Bologna | 1 | 0 | 0 | 1 | 1 | 2 | –1 |
| Italy | Fiorentina | 2 | 0 | 1 | 1 | 0 | 1 | –1 |
| Italy | Genoa | 2 | 0 | 0 | 2 | 0 | 2 | –2 |
| Italy | Juventus | 2 | 0 | 1 | 1 | 0 | 3 | –3 |
| Italy | Lazio | 2 | 1 | 0 | 1 | 2 | 5 | –3 |
| Italy | Milan | 1 | 0 | 0 | 1 | 0 | 4 | –4 |
| Italy | Napoli | 2 | 0 | 1 | 1 | 3 | 4 | –1 |
| Italy | Parma | 1 | 0 | 0 | 1 | 0 | 1 | –1 |
| Italy | Roma | 2 | 0 | 1 | 1 | 0 | 1 | –1 |
| Italy | Sampdoria | 1 | 0 | 1 | 0 | 0 | 0 | 0 |
| Subtotal | | 16 | 1 | 5 | 10 | 6 | 23 | –17 |
| Kazakhstan | Aktobe | 2 | 1 | 1 | 0 | 4 | 3 | +1 |
| Kazakhstan | Shakhter Karagandy | 2 | 1 | 0 | 1 | 2 | 2 | 0 |
| Subtotal | | 4 | 2 | 1 | 1 | 6 | 5 | +1 |
| Kosovo | Drita | 2 | 2 | 0 | 0 | 6 | 3 | +3 |
| Subtotal | | 2 | 2 | 0 | 0 | 6 | 3 | +3 |
| Latvia | Auda | 2 | 0 | 0 | 2 | 3 | 7 | -4 |
| Latvia | RFS | 1 | 1 | 0 | 0 | 4 | 1 | +3 |
| Subtotal | | 3 | 1 | 0 | 3 | 7 | 8 | -1 |
| Lithuania | Ekranas | 2 | 2 | 0 | 0 | 5 | 0 | +5 |
| Subtotal | | 2 | 2 | 0 | 0 | 5 | 0 | +5 |
| Malta | Hibernians | 2 | 1 | 1 | 0 | 1 | 0 | +1 |
| Subtotal | | 2 | 1 | 1 | 0 | 1 | 0 | +1 |
| Moldova | Milsami Orhei | 2 | 2 | 0 | 0 | 4 | 1 | +3 |
| Moldova | Sheriff Tiraspol | 2 | 0 | 2 | 0 | 1 | 1 | 0 |
| Subtotal | | 4 | 2 | 2 | 0 | 5 | 2 | +3 |
| Netherlands | Ajax | 2 | 1 | 0 | 1 | 2 | 2 | 0 |
| Netherlands | Feyenoord | 1 | 1 | 0 | 0 | 4 | 3 | +1 |
| Netherlands | Go Ahead Eagles | 1 | 1 | 0 | 0 | 1 | 0 | +1 |
| Netherlands | Heerenveen | 2 | 1 | 0 | 1 | 3 | 2 | +1 |
| Netherlands | PSV Eindhoven | 4 | 1 | 0 | 3 | 2 | 12 | –10 |
| Netherlands | Twente | 4 | 0 | 2 | 2 | 1 | 3 | –2 |
| Netherlands | Utrecht | 2 | 1 | 1 | 0 | 4 | 2 | +2 |
| Subtotal | | 16 | 6 | 3 | 7 | 17 | 24 | –7 |
| Northern Ireland | Derry City | 2 | 2 | 0 | 0 | 5 | 0 | +5 |
| Northern Ireland | Glentoran | 2 | 1 | 1 | 0 | 6 | 1 | +5 |
| Subtotal | | 4 | 3 | 1 | 0 | 11 | 1 | +10 |
| Norway | Molde | 2 | 2 | 0 | 0 | 4 | 1 | +3 |
| Norway | Rosenborg | 4 | 1 | 1 | 2 | 4 | 7 | –3 |
| Norway | Strømsgodset | 2 | 2 | 0 | 0 | 3 | 0 | +3 |
| Norway | Vålerenga | 2 | 2 | 0 | 0 | 6 | 1 | +5 |
| Norway | Viking | 2 | 1 | 0 | 1 | 4 | 3 | +1 |
| Subtotal | | 12 | 8 | 1 | 3 | 21 | 12 | +9 |
| Poland | Legia Warsaw | 2 | 0 | 2 | 0 | 3 | 3 | 0 |
| Poland | Widzew Łódź | 2 | 1 | 0 | 1 | 1 | 2 | –1 |
| Poland | Zagłębie Lubin | 2 | 2 | 0 | 0 | 3 | 1 | +2 |
| Subtotal | | 6 | 3 | 2 | 1 | 7 | 6 | +1 |
| Portugal | Benfica | 4 | 0 | 2 | 2 | 2 | 5 | –3 |
| Portugal | Rio Ave | 2 | 1 | 1 | 0 | 4 | 3 | +1 |
| Portugal | Sporting CP | 2 | 0 | 1 | 1 | 1 | 5 | –4 |
| Portugal | Vitória de Guimarães | 2 | 0 | 1 | 1 | 0 | 1 | –1 |
| Subtotal | | 10 | 1 | 5 | 4 | 7 | 14 | –7 |
| Republic of Ireland | Bohemian | 2 | 1 | 1 | 0 | 4 | 0 | +4 |
| Republic of Ireland | Shelbourne | 2 | 1 | 1 | 0 | 4 | 1 | +3 |
| Republic of Ireland | St Patrick's Athletic | 2 | 2 | 0 | 0 | 5 | 1 | +4 |
| Subtotal | | 6 | 4 | 2 | 0 | 13 | 2 | +11 |
| (North Macedonia) Republic of Macedonia | KF Shkëndija | 2 | 0 | 0 | 2 | 1 | 3 | −2 |
| (North Macedonia) Republic of Macedonia | Sloga Jugomagnat | 2 | 2 | 0 | 0 | 5 | 1 | +4 |
| (North Macedonia) Republic of Macedonia | Vardar Skopje | 2 | 2 | 0 | 0 | 5 | 1 | +4 |
| Subtotal | | 6 | 4 | 0 | 2 | 11 | 5 | +6 |
| Romania | Rapid București | 2 | 0 | 2 | 0 | 1 | 1 | 0 |
| Subtotal | | 2 | 0 | 2 | 0 | 1 | 1 | 0 |
| Russia / Soviet Union | Spartak Moscow | 2 | 2 | 0 | 0 | 5 | 1 | +4 |
| Subtotal | | 2 | 2 | 0 | 0 | 5 | 1 | +4 |
| San Marino | Virtus | 2 | 2 | 0 | 0 | 11 | 1 | +10 |
| Subtotal | | 2 | 2 | 0 | 0 | 11 | 1 | +10 |
| Scotland | Aberdeen | 2 | 1 | 1 | 0 | 5 | 2 | +3 |
| Scotland | Motherwell | 2 | 2 | 0 | 0 | 6 | 1 | +5 |
| Scotland | Rangers | 7 | 2 | 2 | 3 | 5 | 9 | −4 |
| Subtotal | | 11 | 5 | 3 | 3 | 16 | 12 | +4 |
| Serbia / Serbia and Montenegro | Partizan | 2 | 0 | 1 | 1 | 3 | 5 | –2 |
| Serbia / Serbia and Montenegro | Red Star Belgrade | 1 | 0 | 0 | 1 | 0 | 1 | –1 |
| Serbia / Serbia and Montenegro | TSC Bačka Topola | 1 | 0 | 1 | 0 | 6 | 6 | 0 |
| Serbia / Serbia and Montenegro | Železnik | 2 | 1 | 0 | 1 | 5 | 4 | +1 |
| Subtotal | | 6 | 1 | 2 | 3 | 14 | 16 | –2 |
| Slovakia / Czechoslovakia | DAC Dunajská Streda | 2 | 2 | 0 | 0 | 2 | 0 | +2 |
| Slovakia / Czechoslovakia | Spartak Trnava | 4 | 2 | 0 | 2 | 6 | 6 | 0 |
| Slovakia / Czechoslovakia | Trenčín | 2 | 1 | 0 | 1 | 4 | 3 | +1 |
| Subtotal | | 8 | 5 | 0 | 3 | 12 | 9 | +3 |
| Slovenia | Gorica | 2 | 2 | 0 | 0 | 5 | 0 | +5 |
| Slovenia | Rudar Velenje | 2 | 2 | 0 | 0 | 6 | 0 | +6 |
| Subtotal | | 4 | 4 | 0 | 0 | 11 | 0 | +11 |
| Spain | Athletic Bilbao | 1 | 0 | 0 | 1 | 0 | 1 | –1 |
| Spain | Atlético Madrid | 2 | 0 | 1 | 1 | 1 | 5 | –4 |
| Spain | Barcelona | 5 | 2 | 1 | 2 | 5 | 9 | –4 |
| Spain | Real Betis | 2 | 1 | 1 | 0 | 3 | 0 | +3 |
| Spain | Real Madrid | 2 | 0 | 0 | 2 | 1 | 5 | –4 |
| Spain | Sevilla | 4 | 0 | 0 | 4 | 1 | 7 | –6 |
| Spain | Sporting Gijón | 2 | 1 | 1 | 0 | 3 | 2 | +1 |
| Spain | Valencia | 6 | 2 | 0 | 4 | 6 | 12 | –6 |
| Spain | Villarreal | 4 | 0 | 2 | 2 | 2 | 5 | –3 |
| Subtotal | | 28 | 6 | 6 | 16 | 22 | 46 | –24 |
| Sweden | IFK Göteborg | 2 | 1 | 0 | 1 | 5 | 2 | +3 |
| Sweden | Halmstads BK | 1 | 1 | 0 | 0 | 3 | 0 | +3 |
| Subtotal | | 3 | 2 | 0 | 1 | 8 | 2 | +6 |
| Switzerland | Basel | 3 | 0 | 2 | 1 | 3 | 5 | -2 |
| Switzerland | Grasshopper | 2 | 1 | 0 | 1 | 1 | 1 | 0 |
| Switzerland | Lugano | 2 | 1 | 0 | 1 | 3 | 3 | 0 |
| Switzerland | Servette | 2 | 1 | 1 | 0 | 5 | 2 | +3 |
| Switzerland | St. Gallen | 2 | 0 | 1 | 1 | 2 | 3 | –1 |
| Switzerland | Young Boys | 3 | 1 | 1 | 1 | 8 | 4 | +4 |
| Switzerland | Zürich | 2 | 0 | 2 | 0 | 1 | 1 | 0 |
| Subtotal | | 16 | 4 | 7 | 5 | 23 | 19 | +4 |
| Turkey | Beşiktaş | 1 | 1 | 0 | 0 | 2 | 1 | +1 |
| Turkey | Fenerbahçe | 5 | 1 | 2 | 2 | 4 | 6 | –2 |
| Turkey | Galatasaray | 4 | 2 | 2 | 0 | 8 | 3 | +5 |
| Turkey | Osmanlıspor | 2 | 1 | 0 | 1 | 2 | 3 | –1 |
| Subtotal | | 12 | 5 | 4 | 3 | 16 | 13 | +3 |
| Ukraine / Soviet Union | Dynamo Kyiv | 7 | 2 | 2 | 3 | 10 | 12 | –2 |
| Ukraine / Soviet Union | Karpaty Lviv | 2 | 1 | 1 | 0 | 4 | 3 | +1 |
| Subtotal | | 9 | 3 | 3 | 3 | 14 | 15 | –1 |
| Total | | 354 | 135 | 95 | 124 | 495 | 473 | +22 |

== Key ==
Notes for the abbreviations in the tables below:

- 1QR: First qualifying round
- 2QR: Second qualifying round
- 3QR: Third qualifying round
- PO: Play-off round
- KPO: Knockout phase play-off
- R32: Round of 32
- R16: Round of 16
- QR: Qualifying round
- PR: Preliminary round
- 1R: First round
- 2R: Second round
- 3R: Third round
- QF: Quarter-finals
- SF: Semi-finals
- F: Final

== UEFA Champions League / European Cup ==
| Season | Round | Opponent | Home | Away | Neutral | Aggregate |
|---|---|---|---|---|---|---|
| 1957–58 | 1R | (West Germany) Borussia Dortmund | 3–1 | 2–4 | 1–3^{1} | 6–8 |
| 1960–61 | PR | (Czechoslovakia) Spartak Hradec Králové | WO ^{2} | | N/A | WO ^{2} |
| 1961–62 | PR | Austria Wien | 0–0 | 0–2 | N/A | 0–2 |
| 1968–69 | 1R | (Czechoslovakia) Spartak Trnava | 3–1 | 0–4 | N/A | 3–5 |
| 1976–77 | 1R | (Belgium) Club Brugge | 1–1 | 1–2 | N/A | 2–3 |
| 1978–79 | PR | (France) Monaco | 2–0 | 0–3 | N/A | 2–3 |
| 1985–86 | 1R | (Denmark) Vejle | 4–1 | 1–1 | N/A | 5–2 |
| 1985–86 | 2R | (Hungary) Budapest Honvéd | 4–1 | 0–1 | N/A | 4–2 |
| 1985–86 | QF | (Finland) Kuusysi | 0–0 | 1–0 | N/A | 1–0 |
| 1985–86 | SF | (Belgium) Anderlecht | 3–0 | 0–1 | N/A | 3–1 |
| 1985–86 | F | (Spain) Barcelona | N/A | | 0–0 (2–0 p) | N/A |
| 1986–87 | 1R | Bye | N/A | | | |
| 1986–87 | 2R | (Belgium) Anderlecht | 1–0 | 0–3 | N/A | 1–3 |
| 1987–88 | 1R | (Hungary) MTK Budapest | 4–0 | 0–2 | N/A | 4–2 |
| 1987–88 | 2R | (Cyprus) Omonia | 3–1 | 2–0 | N/A | 5–1 |
| 1987–88 | QF | (Scotland) Rangers | 2–0 | 1–2 | N/A | 3–2 |
| 1987–88 | SF | (Portugal) Benfica | 0–0 | 0–2 | N/A | 0–2 |
| 1988–89 | 1R | (Czechoslovakia) Sparta Prague | 2–2 | 5–1 | N/A | 7–3 |
| 1988–89 | 2R | (Soviet Union) Spartak Moscow | 3–0 | 2–1 | N/A | 5–1 |
| 1988–89 | QF | (Sweden) IFK Göteborg | 5–1 | 0–1 | N/A | 5–2 |
| 1988–89 | SF | (Turkey) Galatasaray | 4–0 | 1–1 | N/A | 5–1 |
| 1988–89 | F | (Italy) Milan | N/A | | 0–4 | N/A |
| 1989–90 | 1R | (Iceland) Fram Reykjavík | 4–0 | 1–0 | N/A | 5–0 |
| 1989–90 | 2R | (Netherlands) PSV | 1–0 | 1–5 | N/A | 2–5 |
| 1993–94 | 1R | (Croatia) Dinamo Zagreb | 1–2 | 3–2 | N/A | 4–4 (a) |
| 1993–94 | 2R | (France) Monaco | 1–0 | 1–4 | N/A | 2–4 |
| 1994–95 | QR | (Switzerland) Servette | 4–1 | 1–1 | N/A | 5–2 |
| 1994–95 | Group C | (Belgium) Anderlecht | 1–1 | 0–0 | N/A | 3rd place |
| 1994–95 | Group C | (Croatia) Hajduk Split | 0–1 | 4–1 | N/A | 3rd place |
| 1994–95 | Group C | (Portugal) Benfica | 1–1 | 1–2 | N/A | 3rd place |
| 1995–96 | QR | (Austria) Red Bull Salzburg | 1–0 | 0–0 | N/A | 1–0 |
| 1995–96 | Group C | (Scotland) Rangers | 1–1 | 1–0 | N/A | 3rd place |
| 1995–96 | Group C | (Italy) Juventus | 0–0 | 0–3 | N/A | 3rd place |
| 1995–96 | Group C | (Germany) Borussia Dortmund | 0–0 | 0–1 | N/A | 3rd place |
| 1996–97 | QR | (Belgium) Club Brugge | 3–0 | 2–2 | N/A | 5–2 |
| 1996–97 | Group B | (Spain) Atlético Madrid | 1–1 | 0–4 | N/A | 4th place |
| 1996–97 | Group B | (Germany) Borussia Dortmund | 0–3 | 3–5 | N/A | 4th place |
| 1996–97 | Group B | (Poland) Widzew Łódź | 1–0 | 0–2 | N/A | 4th place |
| 1997–98 | 1QR | (Bulgaria) CSKA Sofia | 3–3 | 2–0 | N/A | 5–3 |
| 1997–98 | 2QR | (France) Paris Saint-Germain | 3–0^{3} | 0–5 | N/A | 3–5 |
| 1998–99 | 1QR | (Estonia) Flora Tallinn | 4–1 | 1–3 | N/A | 5–4 |
| 1998–99 | 2QR | (Greece) Panathinaikos | 2–2 | 3–6 | N/A | 5–8 |
| 2001–02 | 2QR | (North Macedonia) Sloga Jugomagnat | 3–0 | 2–1 | N/A | 5–1 |
| 2001–02 | 3QR | (Ukraine) Dynamo Kyiv | 2–4 | 1–1 | N/A | 3–5 |
| 2005–06 | 2QR | (Republic of Ireland) Shelbourne | 4–1 | 0–0 | N/A | 4–1 |
| 2005–06 | 3QR | (Norway) Rosenborg | 1–1 | 2–3 | N/A | 3–4 |
| 2006–07 | 2QR | (Slovenia) Gorica | 3–0 | 2–0 | N/A | 5–0 |
| 2006–07 | 3QR | (Belgium) Standard Liège | 2–1 | 2–2 | N/A | 4–3 |
| 2006–07 | Group E | (Ukraine) Dynamo Kyiv | 1–1 | 4–1 | N/A | 3rd place |
| 2006–07 | Group E | (France) Lyon | 0–3 | 1–1 | N/A | 3rd place |
| 2006–07 | Group E | (Spain) Real Madrid | 1–4 | 0–1 | N/A | 3rd place |
| 2007–08 | 2QR | (Poland) Zagłębie Lubin | 2–1 | 1–0 | N/A | 3–1 |
| 2007–08 | 3QR | (Belarus) BATE Borisov | 2–0 | 2–2 | N/A | 4–2 |
| 2007–08 | Group H | (Czech Republic) Slavia Prague | 1–1 | 1–2 | N/A | 4th place |
| 2007–08 | Group H | (England) Arsenal | 0–1 | 1–2 | N/A | 4th place |
| 2007–08 | Group H | (Spain) Sevilla | 0–2 | 1–2 | N/A | 4th place |
| 2008–09 | 3QR | (Turkey) Galatasaray | 1–0 | 2–2 | N/A | 3–2 |
| 2008–09 | Group F | (Germany) Bayern Munich | 0–1 | 0–3 | N/A | 4th place |
| 2008–09 | Group F | (Italy) Fiorentina | 0–1 | 0–0 | N/A | 4th place |
| 2008–09 | Group F | (France) Lyon | 3–5 | 0–2 | N/A | 4th place |
| 2013–14 | 2QR | (North Macedonia) Vardar | 3–0 | 2–1 | N/A | 5–1 |
| 2013–14 | 3QR | (Georgia (country)) Dinamo Tbilisi | 1–1 | 2–0 | N/A | 3–1 |
| 2013–14 | PO | (Poland) Legia Warsaw | 1–1 | 2–2 | N/A | 3–3 (a) |
| 2013–14 | Group E | (Germany) Schalke 04 | 0–0 | 0–3 | N/A | 4th place |
| 2013–14 | Group E | (England) Chelsea | 0–4 | 0–1 | N/A | 4th place |
| 2013–14 | Group E | (Switzerland) Basel | 1–1 | 1–1 | N/A | 4th place |
| 2014–15 | 2QR | (Norway) Strømsgodset | 2–0 | 1–0 | N/A | 3–0 |
| 2014–15 | 3QR | (Kazakhstan) Aktobe | 2–1 | 2–2 | N/A | 4–3 |
| 2014–15 | PO | (Bulgaria) Ludogorets Razgrad | 1–0 | 0–1 | N/A | 1–1 (5–6 p) |
| 2015–16 | 2QR | (Slovakia) Trenčín | 2–3 | 2–0 | N/A | 4–3 |
| 2015–16 | 3QR | (Serbia) Partizan | 1–1 | 2–4 | N/A | 3–5 |
| 2016–17 | 3QR | (Czech Republic) Sparta Prague | 2–0 | 1–1 | N/A | 3–1 |
| 2016–17 | PO | (England) Manchester City | 0–5 | 0–1 | N/A | 0–6 |
| 2017–18 | 3QR | (Czech Republic) Viktoria Plzeň | 2–2 | 4–1 | N/A | 6–3 |
| 2017–18 | PO | (Portugal) Sporting CP | 1–5 | 0–0 | N/A | 1–5 |
| 2024–25 | 1QR | (San Marino) Virtus | 4–0 | 7–1 | N/A | 11–1 |
| 2024–25 | 2QR | (Israel) Maccabi Tel Aviv | 1–1 | 1–0 | N/A | 2–1 |
| 2024–25 | 3QR | (Czech Republic) Sparta Prague | 2–3 | 1–1 | N/A | 3–4 |
| 2025–26 | 1QR | (Andorra) Inter Club d'Escaldes | 3–1 | 1–2 | N/A | 4–3 |
| 2025–26 | 2QR | (North Macedonia) Shkëndija | 0–1 | 1–2 | N/A | 1–3 |

^{1} At the time, the away goal rule was not applied, so a play–off match was played on a neutral ground (Bologna), won 3–1, by Borussia.

^{2} After the defeat of the Romania team against Czechoslovakia in the quarter–finals of the 1960 UEFA European Championship (0–2 in Bucharest and 0–3 in Bratislava), the Communist Authorities decided the withdrawal of all Romanian teams from international competitions to avoid the risk of further "humiliation". Consequently, Romania did not compete also for the qualifiers for 1962 FIFA World Cup where Romania had to play Italy.

^{3} This match ended 3–2, but PSG had fielded a suspended player (Laurent Fournier), so UEFA awarded a 3–0 win for Steaua.

== UEFA Super Cup / European Super Cup ==
| Season | Round | Opponent | Result |
|---|---|---|---|
| 1986 | F | (Soviet Union) Dynamo Kyiv | 1–0 |

== UEFA Europa League / UEFA Cup ==
| Season | Round | Opponent | Home | Away | Aggregate |
|---|---|---|---|---|---|
| 1977–78 | 1R | (Spain) Barcelona | 1–3 | 1–5 | 2–8 |
| 1980–81 | 1R | (Belgium) Standard Liège | 1–2 | 1–1 | 2–3 |
| 1991–92 | 1R | (Cyprus) Anorthosis Famagusta | 2–2 (a.e.t.) | 2–1 | 4–3 |
| 1991–92 | 2R | (Spain) Sporting Gijón | 1–0 | 2–2 | 3–2 |
| 1991–92 | 3R | (Italy) Genoa | 0–1 | 0–1 | 0–2 |
| 1997–98 | 1R | (Turkey) Fenerbahçe | 0–0 | 2–1 | 2–1 |
| 1997–98 | 2R | (France) Bastia | 1–0 | 2–3 | 3–3 (a) |
| 1997–98 | 3R | (England) Aston Villa | 2–1 | 0–2 | 2–3 |
| 1998–99 | 1R | (Spain) Valencia | 3–4 | 0–3 | 3–7 |
| 1999–2000 | QR | (Estonia) Levadia Tallinn | 3–0 | 4–1 | 7–1 |
| 1999–2000 | 1R | (Austria) LASK | 2–0 | 3–2 | 5–2 |
| 1999–2000 | 2R | (England) West Ham United | 2–0 | 0–0 | 2–0 |
| 1999–2000 | 3R | (Czech Republic) Slavia Prague | 1–1 | 1–4 | 2–5 |
| 2001–02 | 1R | (Switzerland) St. Gallen | 1–1 | 1–2 | 2–3 |
| 2003–04 | QR | (Belarus) Neman Grodno | 0–0 | 1–1 | 1–1 (a) |
| 2003–04 | 1R | (England) Southampton | 1–0 | 1–1 | 2–1 |
| 2003–04 | 2R | (England) Liverpool | 1–1 | 0–1 | 1–2 |
| 2004–05 | 2QR | (Serbia and Montenegro) Železnik | 1–2 | 4–2 | 5–4 |
| 2004–05 | 1R | (Bulgaria) CSKA Sofia | 2–1 | 2–2 | 4–3 |
| 2004–05 | Group B | (Belgium) Standard Liège | 2–0 | N/A | 2nd place |
| 2004–05 | Group B | (Italy) Parma | N/A | 0–1 | 2nd place |
| 2004–05 | Group B | (Turkey) Beşiktaş | 2–1 | N/A | 2nd place |
| 2004–05 | Group B | (Spain) Athletic Bilbao | N/A | 0–1 | 2nd place |
| 2004–05 | R32 | (Spain) Valencia | 2–0 | 0–2 | 2–2 (4–3 p) |
| 2004–05 | R16 | (Spain) Villarreal | 0–0 | 0–2 | 0–2 |
| 2005–06 | 1R | (Norway) Vålerenga | 3–1 | 3–0 | 6–1 |
| 2005–06 | Group C | (France) Lens | 4–0 | N/A | 1st place |
| 2005–06 | Group C | (Italy) Sampdoria | N/A | 0–0 | 1st place |
| 2005–06 | Group C | (Sweden) Halmstads BK | 3–0 | N/A | 1st place |
| 2005–06 | Group C | (Germany) Hertha BSC | N/A | 0–0 | 1st place |
| 2005–06 | R32 | (Netherlands) Heerenveen | 0–1 | 3–1 | 3–2 |
| 2005–06 | R16 | (Spain) Real Betis | 0–0 | 3–0 | 3–0 |
| 2005–06 | QF | (Romania) Rapid București | 0–0 | 1–1 | 1–1 (a) |
| 2005–06 | SF | (England) Middlesbrough | 1–0 | 2–4 | 3–4 |
| 2006–07 | R32 | (Spain) Sevilla | 0–2 | 0–1 | 0–3 |
| 2009–10 | 2QR | (Hungary) Újpest | 2–0 | 2–1 | 4–1 |
| 2009–10 | 3QR | (Scotland) Motherwell | 3–0 | 3–1 | 6–1 |
| 2009–10 | PO | (Republic of Ireland) St Patrick's Athletic | 3–0 | 2–1 | 5–1 |
| 2009–10 | Group H | (Moldova) Sheriff Tiraspol | 0–0 | 1–1 | 4th place |
| 2009–10 | Group H | (Netherlands) Twente | 1–1 | 0–0 | 4th place |
| 2009–10 | Group H | (Turkey) Fenerbahçe | 0–1 | 1–3 | 4th place |
| 2010–11 | PO | (Switzerland) Grasshopper | 1–0 | 0–1 | 1–1 (4–3 p) |
| 2010–11 | Group K | (England) Liverpool | 1–1 | 1–4 | 3rd place |
| 2010–11 | Group K | (Italy) Napoli | 3–3 | 0–1 | 3rd place |
| 2010–11 | Group K | (Netherlands) Utrecht | 3–1 | 1–1 | 3rd place |
| 2011–12 | PO | (Bulgaria) CSKA Sofia | 2–0 | 1–1 | 3–1 |
| 2011–12 | Group J | (Germany) Schalke 04 | 0–0 | 1–2 | 2nd place |
| 2011–12 | Group J | (Cyprus) AEK Larnaca | 3–1 | 1–1 | 2nd place |
| 2011–12 | Group J | (Israel) Maccabi Haifa | 4–2 | 0–5 | 2nd place |
| 2011–12 | R32 | (Netherlands) Twente | 0–1 | 0–1 | 0–2 |
| 2012–13 | 3QR | (Slovakia) Spartak Trnava | 0–1 | 3–0 | 3–1 |
| 2012–13 | PO | (Lithuania) Ekranas | 3–0 | 2–0 | 5–0 |
| 2012–13 | Group E | (Germany) VfB Stuttgart | 1–5 | 2–2 | 1st place |
| 2012–13 | Group E | (Denmark) Copenhagen | 1–0 | 1–1 | 1st place |
| 2012–13 | Group E | (Norway) Molde | 2–0 | 2–1 | 1st place |
| 2012–13 | R32 | (Netherlands) Ajax | 2–0 | 0–2 | 2–2 (4–2 p) |
| 2012–13 | R16 | (England) Chelsea | 1–0 | 1–3 | 2–3 |
| 2014–15 | Group J | (Denmark) AaB | 6–0 | 0–1 | 3rd place |
| 2014–15 | Group J | (Ukraine) Dynamo Kyiv | 0–2 | 1–3 | 3rd place |
| 2014–15 | Group J | (Portugal) Rio Ave | 2–1 | 2–2 | 3rd place |
| 2015–16 | PO | (Norway) Rosenborg | 0–3 | 1–0 | 1–3 |
| 2016–17 | Group L | (Spain) Villarreal | 1–1 | 1–2 | 4th place |
| 2016–17 | Group L | (Switzerland) Zürich | 1–1 | 0–0 | 4th place |
| 2016–17 | Group L | (Turkey) Osmanlıspor | 2–1 | 0–2 | 4th place |
| 2017–18 | Group G | (Czech Republic) Viktoria Plzeň | 3–0 | 0–2 | 2nd place |
| 2017–18 | Group G | (Switzerland) Lugano | 1–2 | 2–1 | 2nd place |
| 2017–18 | Group G | (Israel) Hapoel Be'er Sheva | 1–1 | 2–1 | 2nd place |
| 2017–18 | R32 | (Italy) Lazio | 1–0 | 1–5 | 2–5 |
| 2018–19 | 2QR | (Slovenia) Rudar Velenje | 4–0 | 2–0 | 6–0 |
| 2018–19 | 3QR | (Croatia) Hajduk Split | 2–1 | 0–0 | 2–1 |
| 2018–19 | PO | (Austria) Rapid Wien | 2–1 | 1–3 | 3–4 |
| 2019–20 | 1QR | (Moldova) Milsami Orhei | 2–0 | 2–1 | 4–1 |
| 2019–20 | 2QR | (Armenia) Alashkert | 2–3 | 3–0 | 5–3 |
| 2019–20 | 3QR | (Czech Republic) Mladá Boleslav | 0–0 | 1–0 | 1–0 |
| 2019–20 | PO | (Portugal) Vitória de Guimarães | 0–0 | 0–1 | 0–1 |
| 2020–21 | 1QR | (Armenia) Shirak | 3–0 | —N/a | —N/a |
| 2020–21 | 2QR | (Serbia) TSC | —N/a | 6–6 (5–4 p) | —N/a |
| 2020–21 | 3QR | (Czech Republic) Slovan Liberec | 0–2 | —N/a | —N/a |
| 2024–25 | PO | (Austria) LASK | 1–0 | 1–1 | 2–1 |
| 2024–25 | League Phase | (Latvia) RFS | 4–1 | —N/a | 11th place |
| 2024–25 | League Phase | (Greece) PAOK | —N/a | 1–0 | 11th place |
| 2024–25 | League Phase | (Scotland) Rangers | —N/a | 0–4 | 11th place |
| 2024–25 | League Phase | (Denmark) Midtjylland | 2–0 | —N/a | 11th place |
| 2024–25 | League Phase | (Greece) Olympiacos | 0–0 | —N/a | 11th place |
| 2024–25 | League Phase | (Germany) TSG Hoffenheim | —N/a | 0–0 | 11th place |
| 2024–25 | League Phase | (Azerbaijan) Qarabağ | —N/a | 3–2 | 11th place |
| 2024–25 | League Phase | (England) Manchester United | 0–2 | —N/a | 11th place |
| 2024–25 | KPO | (Greece) PAOK | 2–0 | 2–1 | 4–1 |
| 2024–25 | R16 | (France) Lyon | 1–3 | 0–4 | 1–7 |
| 2025–26 | 3QR | (Kosovo) Drita | 3–2 | 3–1 | 6–3 |
| 2025–26 | PO | (Scotland) Aberdeen | 3–0 | 2–2 | 5–2 |
| 2025–26 | League Phase | (Netherlands) Go Ahead Eagles | —N/a | 1–0 | 27th place |
| 2025–26 | League Phase | (Switzerland) Young Boys | 0–2 | —N/a | 27th place |
| 2025–26 | League Phase | (Italy) Bologna | 1–2 | —N/a | 27th place |
| 2025–26 | League Phase | (Switzerland) Basel | —N/a | 1–3 | 27th place |
| 2025–26 | League Phase | (Serbia) Red Star Belgrade | —N/a | 0–1 | 27th place |
| 2025–26 | League Phase | (Netherlands) Feyenoord | 4–3 | —N/a | 27th place |
| 2025–26 | League Phase | (Croatia) Dinamo Zagreb | —N/a | 1–4 | 27th place |
| 2025–26 | League Phase | (Turkey) Fenerbahçe | 1–1 | —N/a | 27th place |

== UEFA Europa Conference League ==
| Season | Round | Opponent | Home | Away | Aggregate |
|---|---|---|---|---|---|
| 2021–22 | 2QR | (Kazakhstan) Shakhter Karagandy | 1–0 | 1–2 (a.e.t.) | 2–2 (3–5 p) |
| 2022–23 | 2QR | (Georgia (country)) Saburtalo Tbilisi | 4–2 | 0–1 | 4–3 |
| 2022–23 | 3QR | (Slovakia) DAC Dunajská Streda | 1–0 | 1–0 | 2–0 |
| 2022–23 | PO | (Norway) Viking | 1–2 | 3–1 | 4–3 |
| 2022–23 | Group B | (England) West Ham United | 0–3 | 1–3 | 4th place |
| 2022–23 | Group B | (Belgium) Anderlecht | 0–0 | 2–2 | 4th place |
| 2022–23 | Group B | (Denmark) Silkeborg | 0–5 | 0–5 | 4th place |
| 2023–24 | 2QR | (Bulgaria) CSKA 1948 | 3–2 | 1–0 | 4–2 |
| 2023–24 | 3QR | (Denmark) Nordsjælland | 0–0 | 0–2 | 0–2 |
| 2026–27 | 2QR | (Latvia) Auda | 2–3 | 1–4 | 3–7 |

== UEFA Cup Winners' Cup / European Cup Winners' Cup ==
| Season | Round | Opponent | Home | Away | Aggregate |
|---|---|---|---|---|---|
| 1962–63 | PR | (Bulgaria) Botev Plovdiv | 3–2 | 1–5 | 4–7 |
| 1964–65 | 1R | (Northern Ireland) Derry City | 3–0 | 2–0 | 5–0 |
| 1964–65 | 2R | (Socialist Federal Republic of Yugoslavia) Dinamo Zagreb | 1–3 | 0–2 | 1–5 |
| 1966–67 | 1R | (France) Strasbourg | 1–1 | 0–1 | 1–2 |
| 1967–68 | 1R | Austria Wien | 2–1 | 2–0 | 4–1 |
| 1967–68 | 2R | (Spain) Valencia | 1–0 | 0–3 | 1–3 |
| 1969–70 | 1R | (Scotland) Rangers | 0–0 | 0–2 | 0–2 |
| 1970–71 | 1R | (Soviet Union) Karpaty Lviv | 3–3 | 1–0 | 4–3 |
| 1970–71 | 2R | (Netherlands) PSV Eindhoven | 0–3 | 0–4 | 0–7 |
| 1971–72 | 1R | (Malta) Hibernians | 1–0 | 0–0 | 1–0 |
| 1971–72 | 2R | (Spain) Barcelona | 2–1 | 1–0 | 3–1 |
| 1971–72 | QF | (West Germany) Bayern Munich | 1–1 | 0–0 | 1–1 (a) |
| 1979–80 | 1R | (Switzerland) Young Boys | 6–0 | 2–2 | 8–2 |
| 1979–80 | 2R | (France) Nantes | 1–2 | 2–3 | 3–5 |
| 1984–85 | 1R | (Italy) Roma | 0–0 | 0–1 | 0–1 |
| 1990–91 | 1R | (Northern Ireland) Glentoran | 5–0 | 1–1 | 6–1 |
| 1990–91 | 2R | (France) Montpellier | 0–3 | 0–5 | 0–8 |
| 1992–93 | 1R | (Republic of Ireland) Bohemian | 4–0 | 0–0 | 4–0 |
| 1992–93 | 2R | (Denmark) AGF Aarhus | 2–1 | 2–3 | 4–4 (a) |
| 1992–93 | QF | (Belgium) Antwerp | 1–1 | 0–0 | 1–1 (a) |

== Intercontinental Cup ==
| Season | Round | Club | Neutral |
|---|---|---|---|
| 1986 | F | (Argentina) River Plate | 0–1 |

== UEFA club coefficient rankings ==
As of 28 June 2026

| Rank | Team | Points |
|---|---|---|
| 77 | (Austria) Sturm Graz | 25.000 |
| 78 | (Cyprus) Pafos | 24.125 |
| 79 | (Romania) FCSB | 24.000 |
| 80 | (Israel) Maccabi Tel Aviv | 23.500 |
| 81 | (England) Nottingham Forest | 23.000 |

=== Football Club Elo ranking ===
As of 14 June 2023

| Rank | Team | Points |
|---|---|---|
| 293 | (France) Ajaccio | 1423 |
| 294 | (Croatia) Osijek | 1422 |
| 295 | (Romania) FCSB | 1422 |
| 296 | (Germany) Magdeburg | 1422 |
| 297 | (Austria) Wolfsberger AC | 1421 |

== European competitions goals ==
=== Goals by player ===
Including away match with Auda. Bold include active player

| Rank | Player | Goals |
|---|---|---|
| 1 | Marius Lăcătuș | 16 |
| 2 | Nicolae Dică | 14 |
| 3 | Ilie Dumitrescu | 13 |
| 3 | Darius Olaru | 13 |
| 5 | Gheorghe Hagi | 12 |
| 5 | Raul Rusescu | 12 |
| 7 | Victoraș Iacob | 10 |
| 7 | Bănel Nicoliță | 10 |
| 9 | Cristian Ciocoiu | 9 |
| 9 | Dorin Goian | 9 |
| 9 | Adrian Ilie | 9 |
| 9 | Bogdan Stancu | 9 |
| 9 | (France) Harlem Gnohéré | 9 |
| 9 | Florinel Coman | 9 |
| 9 | David Miculescu | 9 |
| 9 | Florin Tănase | 9 |
| 17 | Adrian Neaga | 8 |
| 17 | Daniel Birligea | 8 |
| 19 | Sabin Ilie | 7 |
| 19 | Claudiu Răducanu | 7 |
| 19 | Nicolae Stanciu | 7 |
| 22 | Gavril Balint | 6 |
| 22 | Victor Pițurcă | 6 |
| 22 | Ilie Stan | 6 |
| 22 | Cristian Tănase | 6 |
| 26 | Valentin Badea | 5 |
| 26 | Gheorghe Constantin | 5 |
| 26 | Claudiu Keșerü | 5 |
| 26 | Marcel Răducanu | 5 |
| 26 | Ion Vlădoiu | 5 |
| 26 | (France) Malcom Edjouma | 5 |
| 26 | (Cameroon) Joyskim Dawa | 5 |
| 33 | Alexandru Chipciu | 4 |
| 33 | Viorel Năstase | 4 |
| 33 | Daniel Oprița | 4 |
| 33 | Sorin Paraschiv | 4 |
| 33 | Dan Petrescu | 4 |
| 33 | (Italy) Federico Piovaccari | 4 |
| 33 | Laurențiu Roșu | 4 |
| 33 | Constantin Budescu | 4 |
| 33 | Dennis Man | 4 |
| 33 | Andrei Cordea | 4 |
| 33 | (Italy) Juri Cisotti | 4 |
| 44 | Ladislau Bölöni | 3 |
| 44 | Vlad Chiricheș | 3 |
| 44 | Carol Creiniceanu | 3 |
| 44 | Ionel Dănciulescu | 3 |
| 44 | Gabriel Iancu | 3 |
| 44 | (Greece) Pantelis Kapetanos | 3 |

| Rank | Player | Goals |
|---|---|---|
| 44 | Iasmin Latovlevici | 3 |
| 44 | Cătălin Munteanu | 3 |
| 44 | (Montenegro) Stefan Nikolić | 3 |
| 44 | Basarab Panduru | 3 |
| 44 | Mirel Rădoi | 3 |
| 44 | (Brazil) Adi Rocha | 3 |
| 44 | Tudorel Stoica | 3 |
| 44 | Dennis Șerban | 3 |
| 44 | (Brazil) Leandro Tatu | 3 |
| 44 | Gheorghe Tătaru | 3 |
| 44 | Eugen Trică | 3 |
| 44 | Radu Troi | 3 |
| 44 | Dorel Zaharia | 3 |
| 44 | (Ghana) Sulley Muniru | 3 |
| 44 | (Portugal) Filipe Teixeira | 3 |
| 44 | (Montenegro) Risto Radunovic | 3 |
| 44 | Adrian Șut | 3 |
| 67 | Alexandru Andrași | 2 |
| 67 | Sorin Avram | 2 |
| 67 | Gabriel Boștină | 2 |
| 67 | Mihai Costea | 2 |
| 67 | Andrei Cristea | 2 |
| 67 | (Algeria) Jugurtha Hamroun | 2 |
| 67 | Ștefan Iovan | 2 |
| 67 | Petre Marin | 2 |
| 67 | Damian Militaru | 2 |
| 67 | Răzvan Ochiroșii | 2 |
| 67 | Cornel Pavlovici | 2 |
| 67 | Ionel Pârvu | 2 |
| 67 | Ovidiu Petre | 2 |
| 67 | Adrian Popa | 2 |
| 67 | Marian Popa | 2 |
| 67 | Octavian Popescu | 2 |
| 67 | Valeriu Răchită | 2 |
| 67 | Laurențiu Reghecampf | 2 |
| 67 | Ștefan Sameș | 2 |
| 67 | Nicolae Tătaru | 2 |
| 67 | Florea Voinea | 2 |
| 67 | (Brazil) Júnior Morais | 2 |
| 67 | Denis Alibec | 2 |
| 67 | (Croatia) Damjan Đoković | 2 |
| 67 | Daniel Popa | 2 |
| 67 | Ion Alecsandrescu | 2 |
| 67 | Marius Ștefănescu | 2 |
| 67 | Alexandru Baluta | 2 |

| Rank | Player | Goals |
|---|---|---|
| 96 | (Brazil) Arthuro | 1 |
| 96 | Marius Baciu | 1 |
| 96 | Ilie Bărbulescu | 1 |
| 96 | Miodrag Belodedici | 1 |
| 96 | Tiberiu Bone | 1 |
| 96 | (Brazil) Éder Bonfim | 1 |
| 96 | Valeriu Bordeanu | 1 |
| 96 | Alexandru Bourceanu | 1 |
| 96 | Gheorghe Cacoveanu | 1 |
| 96 | Augustin Călin | 1 |
| 96 | Florin Costea | 1 |
| 96 | Cornel Cristescu | 1 |
| 96 | Ion Crișan | 1 |
| 96 | Laurențiu Diniță | 1 |
| 96 | Anton Doboș | 1 |
| 96 | Andrei Dumitraș | 1 |
| 96 | Dumitru Dumitriu | 1 |
| 96 | Ion Dumitru | 1 |
| 96 | (Albania) Albert Duro | 1 |
| 96 | (Cameroon) Nana Falemi | 1 |
| 96 | Lucian Filip | 1 |
| 96 | George Galamaz | 1 |
| 96 | Florin Gardoș | 1 |
| 96 | Constantin Gâlcă | 1 |
| 96 | Sorin Ghionea | 1 |
| 96 | (Poland) Rafał Grzelak | 1 |
| 96 | Ion Hrib | 1 |
| 96 | Viorel Ion | 1 |
| 96 | Adrian Ionescu | 1 |
| 96 | Anghel Iordănescu | 1 |
| 96 | Erik Lincar | 1 |
| 96 | Ion Luțu | 1 |
| 96 | Mihail Majearu | 1 |
| 96 | Dumitru Manea | 1 |
| 96 | (Serbia) Novak Martinović | 1 |
| 96 | (Colombia) Dayro Moreno | 1 |
| 96 | Zsolt Muzsnay | 1 |
| 96 | Roland Nagy | 1 |
| 96 | Adrian Negrău | 1 |

| Rank | Player | Goals |
|---|---|---|
| 96 | Vasile Negrea | 1 |
| 96 | Ion Nițu | 1 |
| 96 | Mihai Pintilii | 1 |
| 96 | Andrei Prepeliță | 1 |
| 96 | Daniel Prodan | 1 |
| 96 | Marin Radu | 1 |
| 96 | Gabriel Raksi | 1 |
| 96 | Cornel Râpă | 1 |
| 96 | Iosif Rotariu | 1 |
| 96 | Lucian Sânmărtean | 1 |
| 96 | Vasile Soo | 1 |
| 96 | Romeo Surdu | 1 |
| 96 | János Székely | 1 |
| 96 | Mihăiță Székely | 1 |
| 96 | Costică Ștefănescu | 1 |
| 96 | (France) Grégory Tadé | 1 |
| 96 | (Colombia) Juan Carlos Toja | 1 |
| 96 | (Cape Verde) Fernando Varela | 1 |
| 96 | Iosif Vigu | 1 |
| 96 | Gabriel Zahiu | 1 |
| 96 | Francisc Zavoda | 1 |
| 96 | Mihai Bălașa | 1 |
| 96 | (Bosnia and Herzegovina) Bojan Golubović | 1 |
| 96 | (Serbia) Marko Momčilović | 1 |
| 96 | Gabriel Tamaș | 1 |
| 96 | Vlad Achim | 1 |
| 96 | Olimpiu Morutan | 1 |
| 96 | Mihai Roman | 1 |
| 96 | Cristian Dumitru | 1 |
| 96 | Iulian Cristea | 1 |
| 96 | Ionuț Panțîru | 1 |
| 96 | Răzvan Oaidă | 1 |
| 96 | Alexandru Buziuc | 1 |
| 96 | Adrian Petre | 1 |
| 96 | Daniel Benzar | 1 |
| 96 | (Estonia) Joonas Tamm | 1 |
| 96 | (Belgium) William Baeten | 1 |
| 96 | (Bosnia and Herzegovina) Daniel Graovac | 1 |
| 96 | Dennis Politic | 1 |
| 96 | (South Africa) Siyabonga Ngezana | 1 |
| 96 | Mihai Toma | 1 |
| 96 | (Senegal) Mamadou Thiam | 1 |
| 96 | (Cape Verde) João Paulo Fernandes | 1 |
| 96 | (France) Aymen Boutoutaou | 1 |
Own goals
| 1 | (Poland) Daniel Bogusz | 1 |
| 1 | (Malta) Edgar Caruana | 1 |
| 1 | (Cyprus) Evagoras Christofi | 1 |
| 1 | (Northern Ireland) Stephen Craigan | 1 |
| 1 | (Brazil) Emílson Cribari | 1 |
| 1 | (Serbia) Ivica Dragutinović | 1 |
| 1 | (Montenegro) Igor Pavlović | 1 |
| 1 | (Netherlands) Alje Schut | 1 |
| 1 | (Iceland) Ragnar Sigurðsson | 1 |
| 1 | (Serbia) Bojan Balaz | 1 |

=== Hat-tricks ===
| No. | Date | Player | Match | Score |
|---|---|---|---|---|
| 1 | 15 March 1988 | Marius Lăcătuș | Steaua – Göteborg | 5–1 |
| 2 | 18 September 2014 | Claudiu Keșerü | Steaua – AaB | 6–0 |
| 3 | 17 September 2020 | Dennis Man | FC FCSB – Bačka Topola | 6–6 |
| 4 | 9 July 2024 | Darius Olaru | FC FCSB – Virtus | 7–1 |

=== Two goals in one match ===
| No. | Date | Player | Match | Score |
|---|---|---|---|---|
| 1 | 9 September 1964 | Cornel Pavlovici | Steaua – Derry City | 3–0 |
| 2 | 16 September 1964 | Carol Creiniceanu | Derry City – Steaua | 0–2 |
| 3 | 3 November 1971 | Viorel Năstase | Steaua – Barcelona | 2–1 |
| 4 | 30 August 1979 | Radu Troi | Steaua – Monaco | 2–0 |
| 5 | 3 October 1979 | Ștefan Sameș | Steaua – Young Boys | 6–0 |
| 6 | 24 October 1979 | Marcel Răducanu | Nantes – Steaua | 3–2 |
| 7 | 16 April 1986 | Victor Pițurcă | Steaua – Anderlecht | 3–0 |
| 8 | 16 September 1987 | Gheorghe Hagi | Steaua – MTK Budapest | 4–0 |
| 9 | 7 September 1988 | Marius Lăcătuș | Sparta Prague – Steaua | 1–5 |
| 10 | 7 September 1988 | Gheorghe Hagi | Sparta Prague – Steaua | 1–5 |
| 11 | 26 October 1988 | Gheorghe Hagi | Steaua – Spartak Moscow | 3–0 |
| 12 | 3 October 1990 | Ilie Dumitrescu | Steaua – Glentoran | 5–0 |
| 13 | 3 October 1990 | Dan Petrescu | Steaua – Glentoran | 5–0 |
| 14 | 1 October 1991 | Ilie Stan | Steaua – Anorthosis Famagusta | 2–2 |
| 15 | 29 September 1992 | Alexandru Andrași | Steaua – Bohemian | 4–0 |
| 16 | 28 September 1994 | Ion Vlădoiu | Dinamo Zagreb – Steaua | 2–3 |
| 17 | 7 December 1994 | Adrian Ilie | Hajduk Split – Steaua | 1–4 |
| 18 | 7 August 1996 | Adrian Ilie | Club Brugge – Steaua | 2–2 |
| 19 | 21 August 1996 | Adrian Ilie | Steaua – Club Brugge | 3–0 |
| 20 | 4 November 1997 | Cătălin Munteanu | Bastia – Steaua | 3–2 |
| 21 | 25 November 1997 | Cristian Ciocoiu | Steaua – Aston Villa | 2–1 |
| 22 | 22 July 1998 | Cristian Ciocoiu | Steaua – Flora Tallinn | 4–1 |
| 23 | 26 August 1998 | Valeriu Răchită | Panathinaikos – Steaua | 6–3 |
| 24 | 12 August 1999 | Sabin Ilie | Steaua – Levadia Tallinn | 3–0 |
| 25 | 26 August 1999 | Laurențiu Roșu | Levadia Tallinn – Steaua | 1–4 |
| 26 | 25 July 2001 | Claudiu Răducanu | Steaua – Sloga Jugomagnat | 3–0 |
| 27 | 8 August 2001 | Eugen Trică | Steaua – Dynamo Kyiv | 2–4 |
| 28 | 12 August 2004 | Adrian Neaga | Železnik – Steaua | 2–4 |
| 29 | 24 February 2005 | Andrei Cristea | Steaua – Valencia | 2–0 |
| 30 | 20 October 2005 | Nicolae Dică | Steaua – Lens | 4–0 |
| 31 | 16 March 2006 | Bănel Nicoliță | Real Betis – Steaua | 0–3 |
| 32 | 23 August 2006 | Valentin Badea | Steaua – Standard Liège | 2–1 |
| 33 | 13 September 2006 | Nicolae Dică | Dynamo Kyiv – Steaua | 1–4 |
| 34 | 6 August 2009 | Bogdan Stancu | Motherwell – Steaua | 1–3 |
| 35 | 20 August 2009 | Bogdan Stancu | Steaua – St Patrick's Athletic | 3–0 |
| 36 | 4 November 2010 | Bogdan Stancu | Steaua – Utrecht | 3–1 |
| 37 | 4 November 2011 | Cristian Tănase | Steaua – Maccabi Haifa | 4–2 |
| 38 | 14 December 2011 | (Montenegro) Stefan Nikolić | Steaua – AEK Larnaca | 3–1 |
| 39 | 30 August 2012 | (Brazil) Adi Rocha | Steaua – Ekranas | 3–0 |
| 40 | 30 July 2013 | Gabriel Iancu | Dinamo Tbilisi – Steaua | 0–2 |
| 41 | 18 September 2014 | Raul Rusescu | Steaua – AaB | 6–0 |
| 42 | 23 October 2014 | Raul Rusescu | Steaua – Rio Ave | 2–1 |
| 43 | 3 August 2016 | Nicolae Stanciu | FC FCSB – Sparta Prague | 2–0 |
| 44 | 14 September 2017 | Constantin Budescu | FC FCSB – Viktoria Plzeň | 3–0 |
| 45 | 19 October 2017 | (France) Harlem Gnohéré | Hapoel Be'er Sheva – FC FCSB | 1–2 |
| 46 | 16 August 2018 | (France) Harlem Gnohéré | FC FCSB – Hajduk Split | 2–1 |
| 47 | 11 July 2019 | Florin Tănase | FC FCSB – Milsami Orhei | 2–0 |
| 48 | 3 August 2023 | (Croatia) Damjan Đoković | FC FCSB – CSKA 1948 | 3–2 |
| 49 | 9 July 2024 | Daniel Popa | FC FCSB – Virtus | 7–1 |
| 50 | 9 July 2024 | David Miculescu | FC FCSB – Virtus | 7–1 |
| 51 | 16 July 2024 | (France) Malcom Edjouma | FC FCSB – Virtus | 4–0 |
| 52 | 26 September 2024 | Darius Olaru | FC FCSB – RFS | 4–1 |
| 53 | 28 August 2025 | Darius Olaru | FC FCSB - Aberdeen | 3-0 |
