= 1990 Cupa României final =

- Event: 1989–90 Cupa României
Dinamo București	Steaua București
6	4
- Date: 2 May 1990
- Venue: 23 August, Bucharest
- Referee: Mircea Salomir (Cluj-Napoca)
- Attendance: 30,000

The 1990 Cupa României final was the 52nd final of Romania's most prestigious football cup competition. It was disputed between Dinamo București and Steaua București, and was won by Dinamo București after a game with ten goals. It was the seventh cup for Dinamo București.

== Route to the final ==
Dinamo București

Round of 16	Dinamo București	2–0	Universitatea Cluj
Quarter-finals	Dinamo București	3–1	Politehnica Timișoara
Semi-finals	Dinamo București	0–0 (a.e.t.)(4–3 p)	Universitatea Craiova

Steaua București

Round of 16	Dermata Cluj	1–8	Steaua București
Quarter-finals	Steaua București	2–1	Farul Constanța
Semi-finals	Steaua București	3–0	Petrolul Ploiești

== Match details ==
2 May 1990
17:00 EET

Dinamo București	6–4	Steaua București
Răducioiu 3', 42', 82'; Mateuț 39'; Sabău 47'; Lupu 56'	Report	Dumitrescu 22'; Lăcătuș 68'; Rotariu 70'; Ungureanu 85'

23 August, Bucharest
Attendance: 30,000
Referee: Mircea Salomir (Cluj-Napoca)

GK	(Romania) Bogdan Stelea
DF	(Romania) Anton Doboș	(substituted off) 57'
DF	(Romania) Mircea Rednic
DF	(Romania) Ioan Andone
DF	(Romania) Michael Klein
MF	(Romania) Ioan Lupescu
MF	(Romania) Ioan Sabău
MF	(Romania) Dorin Mateuț	(substituted off) 65'
MF	(Romania) Dănuț Lupu
FW	(Romania) Claudiu Vaișcovici
FW	(Romania) Florin Răducioiu
Substitutes:
MF	(Romania) Daniel Timofte	(substituted in) 57'
MF	(Romania) Ionel Fulga	(substituted in) 65'
Manager:
(Romania) Mircea Lucescu

GK	(Romania) Daniel Gherasim
DF	(Romania) Lucian Ciocan
DF	(Romania) Adrian Negrău
DF	(Romania) Alin Artimon	(substituted off) 57'
DF	(Romania) Nicolae Ungureanu
MF	(Romania) Daniel Minea
MF	(Romania) Zsolt Muzsnay
MF	(Romania) Iosif Rotariu
MF	(Romania) Ilie Dumitrescu
FW	(Romania) Marius Lăcătuș
FW	(Romania) Gavril Balint	(substituted off) 57'
Substitutes:
MF	(Romania) Ilie Stan	(substituted in) 57'
FW	(Romania) Gheorghe Pena	(substituted in) 57'
Manager:
(Romania) Anghel Iordănescu

== See also ==
- List of Cupa României finals
