= Iordănescu =

Iordănescu is a Romanian surname. Notable people with the surname include:

- Anghel Iordănescu (born 1950), Romanian footballer and manager
- Edward Iordănescu (born 1978), Romanian football manager and player
