= Romania Coach of the Year =

Annual association football award

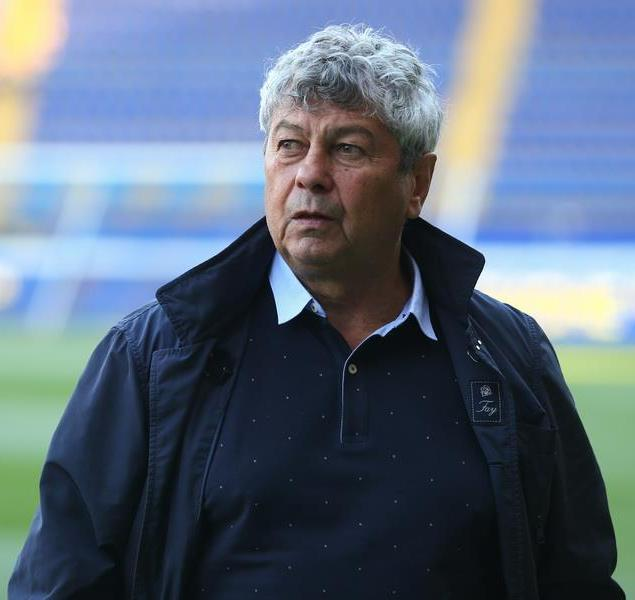
- Mircea Lucescu (pictured) holds the record for the most wins along with Dan Petrescu
- Sport: Association football
- Competition: All levels of Romanian and international football
- Local name: Antrenorul anului în România (Romanian)
- Country: Romania
- Presented by: Gazeta Sporturilor

History
- First award: 2004
- Editions: 22
- First winner: Mircea Lucescu
- Most wins: Mircea Lucescu, Dan Petrescu 5 times
- Most recent: Cristian Chivu
- Website: Official website

The Romania Coach of the Year (Romanian: Antrenorul anului în România) is an annual association football award given by the Gazeta Sporturilor newspaper to the head coach in Romania adjudged to have been the best during a calendar year. Mircea Lucescu and Dan Petrescu hold the record for the most wins with five each.

== Award history ==
The award was created in 2004, with both Romanian coaches operating inside the country and abroad being eligible for the award, as well as foreign coaches in Romania. The only winner in the latter category is Ukrainian manager Oleh Protasov, who received the trophy for his performances with FC Steaua București in 2005.

Other annual honours handed out by Gazeta Sporturilor include the Romanian Footballer of the Year and the Foreign Player of the Year in Romania awards.

== Winners ==
Year	Winner	Club	Ref.
2004	Mircea Lucescu	(Ukraine) Shakhtar Donetsk	
2005	(Ukraine) Oleh Protasov	Steaua București	
2006	Cosmin Olăroiu	Steaua București	
2007	Victor Pițurcă	Romania national team	
2008	Dan Petrescu	Unirea Urziceni	
2009	Dan Petrescu	Unirea Urziceni	
2010	Mircea Lucescu	(Ukraine) Shakhtar Donetsk	
2011	Dan Petrescu	(Russia) Kuban Krasnodar	
2012	Mircea Lucescu	(Ukraine) Shakhtar Donetsk	
2013	Laurențiu Reghecampf	Steaua București	
2014	Mircea Lucescu	(Ukraine) Shakhtar Donetsk	
2015	Gheorghe Hagi	Viitorul Constanța	
2016	Marius Șumudică	Astra Giurgiu	
2017	Gheorghe Hagi	Viitorul Constanța	
2018	Răzvan Lucescu	(Greece) PAOK	
2019	Dan Petrescu	CFR Cluj	
2020	Cosmin Olăroiu; Răzvan Lucescu	(China) Jiangsu Suning (Saudi Arabia) Al-Hilal	
2021	Mircea Lucescu	(Ukraine) Dynamo Kyiv	
2022	Dan Petrescu	CFR Cluj	
2023	Edward Iordănescu	Romania national team	
2024	Edward Iordănescu	Romania national team	
2025	Cristian Chivu	(Italy) Inter Milan	

== Breakdown of winners ==
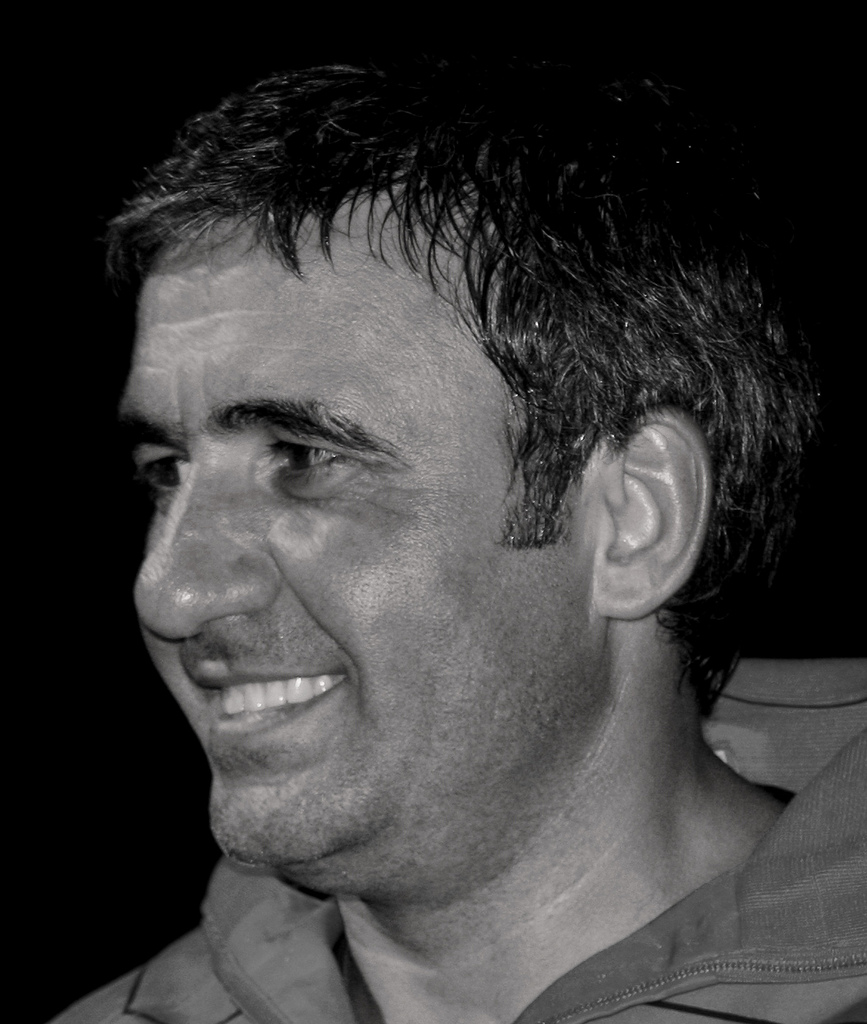
Gheorghe Hagi won the award two times and also holds the record for the most Romanian Footballer of the Year trophies.

=== By number of wins ===
Manager/Coach	Win(s) (outright wins/shared titles)	Year(s) (* title was shared)
Mircea Lucescu	5	2004, 2010, 2012, 2014, 2021
Dan Petrescu	5	2008, 2009, 2011, 2019, 2022
Gheorghe Hagi	2	2015, 2017
Edward Iordanescu	2	2023, 2024
Răzvan Lucescu	2 (1/1)	2018, 2020*
Cosmin Olăroiu	2 (1/1)	2006, 2020*
5 others	1	—

== See also ==
- Gazeta Sporturilor Romanian Footballer of the Year
- Gazeta Sporturilor Foreign Player of the Year in Romania
- Gazeta Sporturilor Monthly Football Awards
