= 1989 European Cup final =

- Match programme cover
- Event: 1988–89 European Cup
Steaua București	Milan
(Romania)	(Italy)
0	4
- Date: 24 May 1989
- Venue: Camp Nou, Barcelona
- Referee: Karl-Heinz Tritschler (West Germany)
- Attendance: 97,000

The 1989 European Cup final was a football match played at the Camp Nou in Barcelona, Spain, on 24 May 1989 that saw Milan of Italy defeat Steaua București of Romania 4–0. Two goals each from Ruud Gullit and Marco Van Basten gave the Rossoneri their third European Cup title and the first in 20 years.

== Route to the final ==
(Romania) Steaua București				Round	(Italy) Milan			
Opponent	Agg.	1st leg	2nd leg		Opponent	Agg.	1st leg	2nd leg
(Czechoslovakia) Sparta Prague	7–3	5–1 (A)	2–2 (H)	First round	(Bulgaria) Vitosha	7–2	2–0 (A)	5–2 (H)
(Soviet Union) Spartak Moscow	5–1	3–0 (H)	2–1 (A)	Second round	(Socialist Federal Republic of Yugoslavia) Red Star Belgrade	2–2 (4–2 p)	1–1 (H)	1–1 (a.e.t.) (A)
(Sweden) IFK Göteborg	5–2	0–1 (A)	5–1 (H)	Quarter-finals	(West Germany) Werder Bremen	1–0	0–0 (A)	1–0 (H)
(Turkey) Galatasaray	5–1	4–0 (H)	1–1 (A)	Semi-finals	(Spain) Real Madrid	6–1	1–1 (A)	5–0 (H)

== Match ==
=== Details ===
24 May 1989
20:15 CEST

Steaua București (Romania)	0–4	(Italy) Milan
	Report	Gullit 18', 38'; Van Basten 28', 46'

Camp Nou, Barcelona
Attendance: 97,000
Referee: Karl-Heinz Tritschler (West Germany)

Steaua București	Milan

GK	1	(Romania) Silviu Lung
RB	2	(Romania) Dan Petrescu
CB	3	(Romania) Nicolae Ungureanu
CB	4	(Romania) Adrian Bumbescu
RM	5	(Romania) Tudorel Stoica (c)
LB	6	(Romania) Ștefan Iovan
CF	7	(Romania) Marius Lăcătuș
CM	8	(Romania) Daniel Minea
CF	9	(Romania) Victor Pițurcă
CM	10	(Romania) Gheorghe Hagi
LM	11	(Romania) Iosif Rotariu	(substituted off) 46'
Substitutes:
GK	12	(Romania) Gheorghe Liliac
DF	13	(Romania) Petre Bunaciu
MF	14	(Romania) Gabi Balint	(substituted on) 46'
MF	15	(Romania) Lucian Bălan
FW	16	(Romania) Adrian Negrău
Manager:
(Romania) Anghel Iordănescu

GK	1	(Italy) Giovanni Galli
RB	2	(Italy) Mauro Tassotti
LB	3	(Italy) Paolo Maldini
RM	4	(Italy) Angelo Colombo
CB	5	(Italy) Alessandro Costacurta		(substituted off) 75'
CB	6	(Italy) Franco Baresi (c)	(yellow card) 48'
LM	7	(Italy) Roberto Donadoni
CM	8	(Netherlands) Frank Rijkaard
CF	9	(Netherlands) Marco van Basten
AM	10	(Netherlands) Ruud Gullit		(substituted off) 59'
CM	11	(Italy) Carlo Ancelotti
Substitutes:
GK	12	(Italy) Davide Pinato
DF	13	(Italy) Filippo Galli		(substituted on) 75'
DF	14	(Italy) Roberto Mussi
MF	15	(Italy) Alberico Evani
FW	16	(Italy) Pietro Paolo Virdis		(substituted on) 59'
Manager:
(Italy) Arrigo Sacchi

Assistant referees:
Werner Föckler (West Germany)
Eugen Strigel (West Germany)

Match rules

- 90 minutes.
- 30 minutes of extra time if necessary.
- Penalty shoot-out if scores still level.
- Five named substitutes.
- Maximum of two substitutions.

== See also ==
- 1988–89 AC Milan season
- 1989 European Cup Winners' Cup final
- 1989 European Super Cup
- 1989 UEFA Cup final
- Steaua București in European football
- AC Milan in international football
