= Iulian Minea =

Romanian footballer

Personal information
- Date of birth: 6 December 1969 (age 56)
- Place of birth: Bucharest, Romania
- Position: Central midfielder

Youth career
- 1987–1988: Steaua Bucureşti

Senior career*
Years	Team	Apps	(Gls)
1988	ASA Târgu Mureș	9	(0)
1989–1990	Mecanică Fină București		
1990–1992	Steaua Bucureşti	39	(4)
1992–1993	Argeș Pitești	9	(1)
1993–1994	Faur București	26	(1)
1994–1995	Pupuk Kaltim		
1995–1996	Poiana Câmpina	11	(4)
1997	Poiana Câmpina	15	(1)
Total		109	(11)

International career
1989	Romania Olympic	2	(0)
1990	Romania U21	3	(0)
- * Club domestic league appearances and goals

Iulian Minea (born 6 December 1969) is a Romanian former professional footballer who played as a midfielder. His brother, Daniel was also a professional footballer, they played together at Steaua Bucureşti.

== Honours ==
Mecanică Fină Bucureşti

- Divizia C: 1988–89

Steaua Bucureşti

- Cupa României: 1991–92
