= Daniel Minea =

Romanian footballer

Personal information
- Full name: Daniel Adrian Minea
- Date of birth: 26 December 1961 (age 64)
- Place of birth: Călăraşi, Romania
- Position: Midfielder

Senior career*
Years	Team	Apps	(Gls)
1980–1983	Steaua București	42	(2)
1983–1988	Olt Scornicești	141	(7)
1989–1991	Steaua București	60	(8)
1991–1996	K. Sint-Niklase S.K.E.	118	(10)
Total		361	(27)

International career
1981–1987	Romania U21	11	(2)
- * Club domestic league appearances and goals

Daniel Adrian Minea (born 26 December 1961) is a Romanian former professional footballer who played as a midfielder in the 1980s and 1990s.

== Career ==
Minea started his career with Steaua București, before moving to Olt Scornicești. He returned to Steaua in 1989 and he went on to play for them in their 1989 European Cup Final defeat by A.C. Milan. He was still at the club in 1990–91 when he played two games in that season's Cup Winners Cup, one of which was the 1st round, second leg match against Glentoran.

Minea played a total of 243 Divizia A matches for Steaua Bucharest and FC Olt, scoring 17 goals.

In 1991, he joined Belgian side K. Sint-Niklase S.K.E. and he remained with them for five seasons before retiring in 1996. He made 118 league appearances for them scoring 10 goals.

His brother, Iulian, was also a professional footballer, they played together at Steaua București.

== Honours ==
Steaua București

- Divizia A: 1988–89
- Cupa României: 1988–89
- European Cup runner-up: 1988–89
