= Edward Iordănescu =

Romanian football manager and player (born 1978)

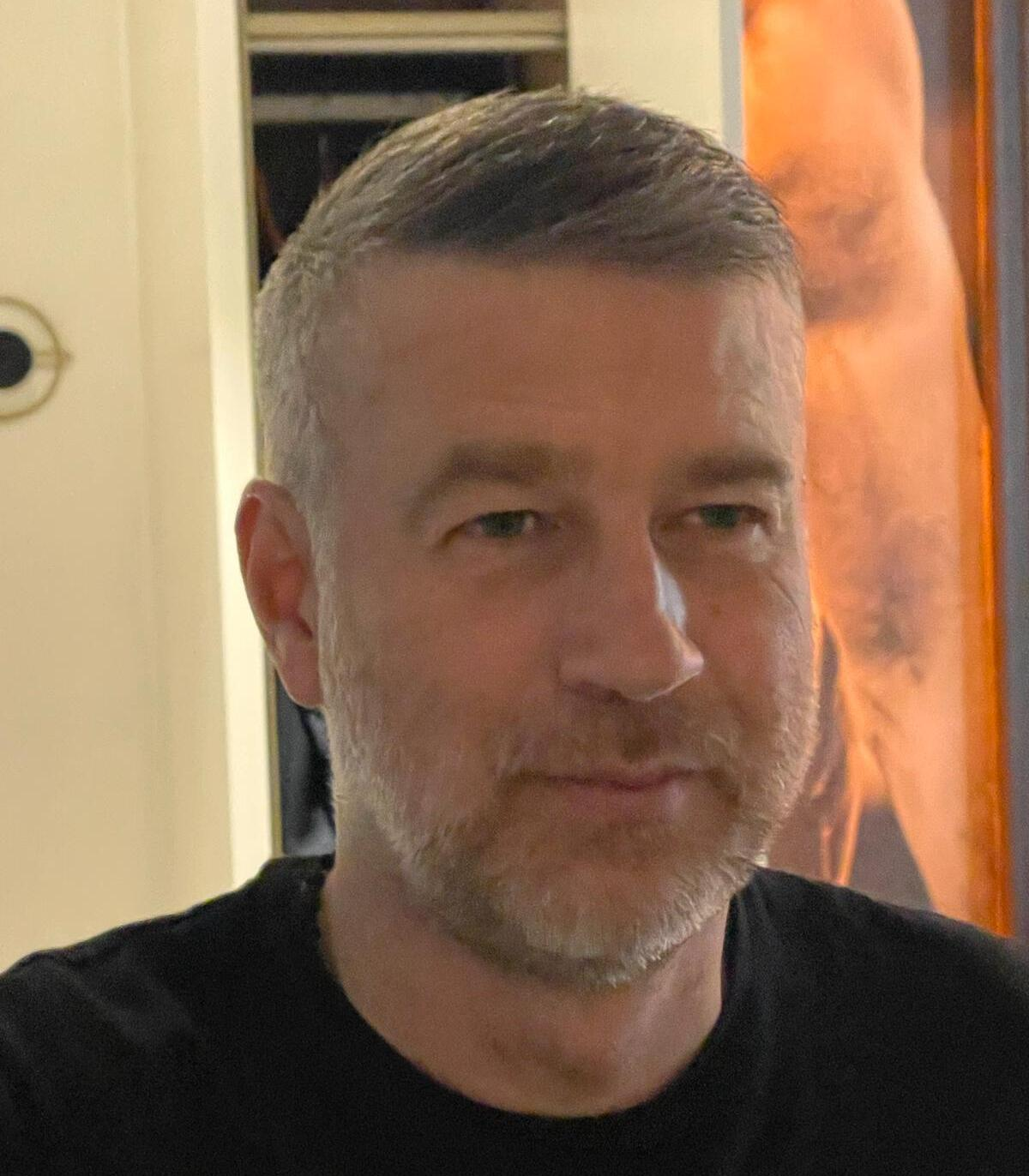
- Iordănescu in 2024

Personal information
- Full name: Edward Marius Iordănescu
- Date of birth: 16 June 1978 (age 48)
- Place of birth: Bucharest, Romania
- Height: 1.85 m (6 ft 1 in)
- Position: Midfielder

Youth career
- 1984–1996: Steaua București

Senior career*
Years	Team	Apps	(Gls)
1996	Steaua București	1	(0)
1997–1998	Sportul Studențesc	0	(0)
1998–1999	Panionios	2	(0)
1999–2000	Diplomatic Focșani	18	(1)
2000–2001	Rapid București	0	(0)
2001	→ Rocar București (loan)	1	(0)
2001–2002	Alki Larnaca	5	(0)
2002–2003	Petrolul Ploiești	8	(0)
2003–2004	Vaslui	8	(0)
2004–2005	Rapid II București	6	(0)
Total		49	(1)

Managerial career
- 2010: Steaua București (assistant)
- 2010: Steaua București (caretaker)
- 2011–2012: Steaua București (assistant)
- 2012: Vaslui (assistant)
- 2012: Vaslui (caretaker)
- 2013: Fortuna Brazi
- 2013: ASA Târgu Mureș
- 2014–2016: Pandurii Târgu Jiu
- 2016: CSKA Sofia
- 2017–2018: Astra Giurgiu
- 2018: CFR Cluj
- 2019–2020: Gaz Metan Mediaș
- 2020–2021: CFR Cluj
- 2021: FCSB
- 2022–2024: Romania
- 2025: Legia Warsaw
- * Club domestic league appearances and goals

Edward "Edi" Marius Iordănescu (Romanian pronunciation: [ˈedu.ard jordəˈnesku]; born 16 June 1978), sometimes known as Iordănescu Jr., is a Romanian professional football manager and former player, most recently in charge of Ekstraklasa club Legia Warsaw.

A midfielder, Iordănescu represented nine teams during a rather uneventful playing career, including stints abroad with Panionios and Alki Larnaca. He started both his playing and coaching career at Steaua București, emulating his father Anghel.

Following his retirement as a player, Iordănescu emerged as a notable figure in the Romanian managerial sphere, earning praise for his meticulous approach to match preparation. He guided CFR Cluj to three domestic trophies during his two stints, and in 2022 was appointed at the helm of the Romania national team, subsequently leading them to qualification for the UEFA Euro 2024. In 2025, Iordănescu joined Polish club Legia Warsaw.

== Playing career ==
Iordănescu's link with Steaua București began in early 1984, aged six, when his father Anghel, who was an assistant coach at the time, would take him along to attend games at the Ghencea Stadium. He frequently sat alongside Alin Stoica, also the son of a club legend, and began playing together during warm-ups and halftime breaks. After progressing through Steaua's youth ranks, Iordănescu made his debut for the first team in 1996, alongside Stoica.

In 1997, after failing to impose himself at the Roș-albaștrii, Iordănescu left for Sportul Studențesc. Throughout his career, he played for various clubs in Romania—Unirea Focșani, Rapid București, Rocar București, Petrolul Ploiești, and Vaslui. He also had spells abroad in Greece and Cyprus with Panionios and Alki Larnaca, respectively.

== Managerial career ==
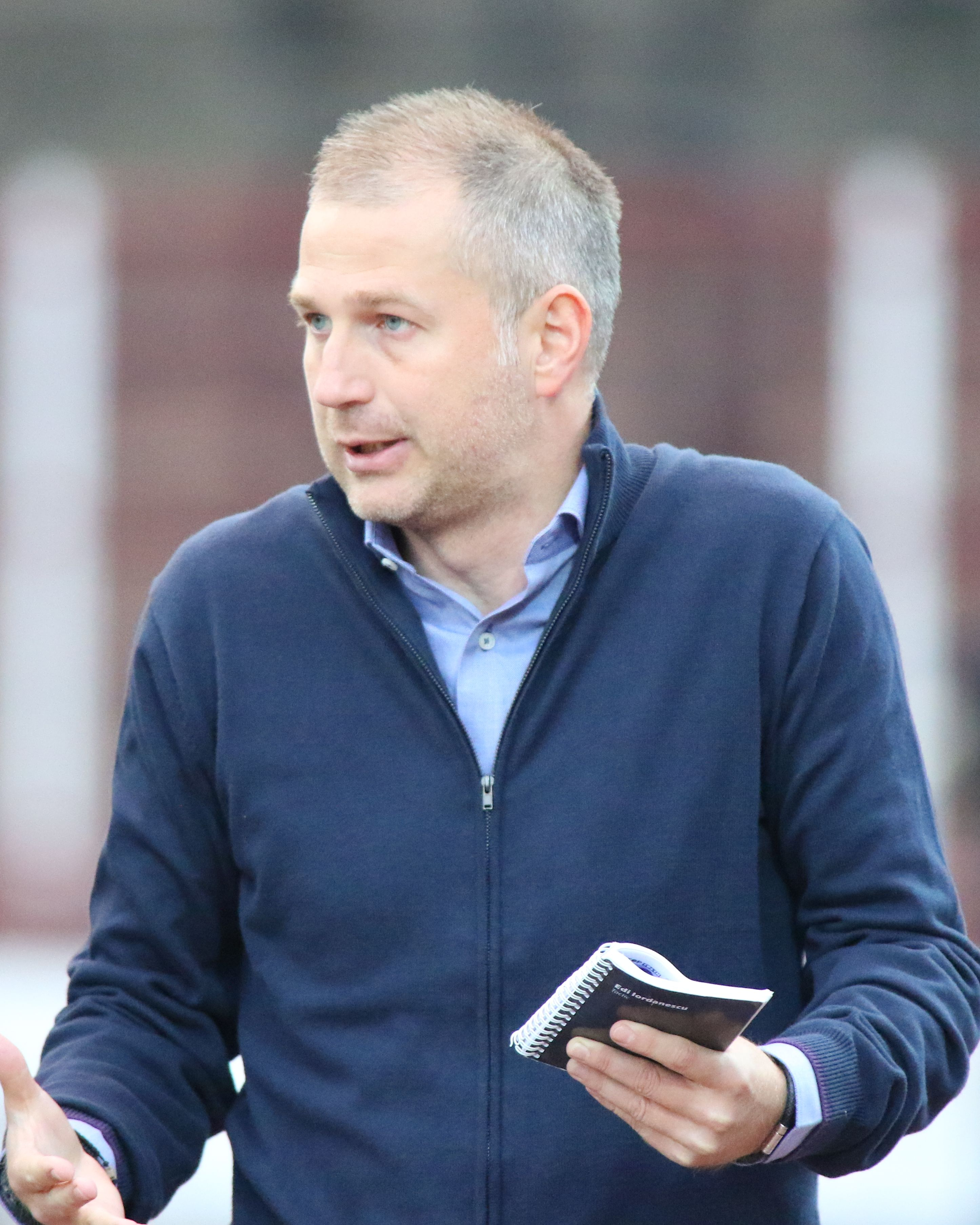
Iordănescu as the head coach of CSKA Sofia in 2016

Iordănescu ended his playing career in 2004 to pursue managerial studies, undertaking courses in Italy, Spain, and England. In 2010, following Ilie Dumitrescu's resignation as manager of Steaua București, he assumed the role of interim coach. Iordănescu served in minor assistant or caretaker roles at Steaua and Vaslui, before securing his first contract as a head coach at Fortuna Brazi in 2013.

=== Romanian clubs ===
On 20 June 2013, Iordănescu signed a contract with second division team ASA Târgu Mureș, with the explicit objective of promoting to the Liga I; he resigned from the position in October 2013. In December 2014, he was named the head coach of top flight club Pandurii Târgu Jiu. Under his guidance, the team reached the final of the 2014–15 Cupa Ligii.

=== CSKA Sofia ===
On 24 August 2016, Iordănescu was announced as the new head coach of Bulgarian side CSKA Sofia, after also attracting the interest of Lech Poznań. On 27 November 2016, after a 1–1 home draw against Vereya, he resigned from his position.

=== Back to Romania ===
On 8 June 2017, Iordănescu signed a deal with Liga I club Astra Giurgiu. On 2 April 2018, his contract with the club was terminated through a mutual agreement. On 13 June 2018, Iordănescu signed a three-year contract with CFR Cluj, taking over from Dan Petrescu, who left for Guizhou Hengfeng. He won his first managerial trophy on 15 July that year, as his new side defeated Universitatea Craiova 1–0 in the 2018 Supercupa României. He departed CFR Cluj in less than two months, following disagreements with owner Ioan Varga, who attempted to interfere in managerial decisions during matches.

Between January 2019 and June 2020, Iordănescu had a stint at Gaz Metan Mediaș, before making a return to CFR Cluj in December 2020. He guided the latter to another Supercupa României and the 2020–21 Liga I title, but refused to stay beyond the expiration of his contract at the end of the campaign.

In August 2021, he made a comeback to Steaua București—now known as FCSB—but this time as a head coach for the first time. On 12 September, his team thrashed Dinamo București 6–0 in the league, representing the largest goal difference in the eternal derby. Iordănescu departed in November 2021 after falling out with owner Gigi Becali.

=== Romania national team ===
On 25 January 2022, Iordănescu was appointed as the manager of the Romania national team, which his father Anghel had also coached during three stints. On 18 November 2023, after a 2–1 win against Israel, his country secured qualification for the UEFA Euro 2024. For this achievement, the Gazeta Sporturilor sports website named him the 2023 Romania Coach of the Year.

=== Legia Warsaw ===
On 12 June 2025, Iordănescu took over the Polish Ekstraklasa club Legia Warsaw.

During the subsequent summer window the club added several first-team players: Danish centre-forward Mileta Rajović signed from Watford, Poland international left-back Arkadiusz Reca arrived on a free transfer after leaving Spezia, and Slovenia right-back Petar Stojanović following the expiry of his Empoli contract. Iordănescu recorded his first trophy with the side on 13 July 2025, when Legia defeated reigning champions Lech Poznań 2–1 in Poznań to secure the Polish Super Cup.

Under Iordănescu, Legia began their 2025–26 European campaign in the UEFA Europa League qualifiers, defeating FC Aktobe 2–0 on aggregate in the first qualifying round. However, they were eliminated in the third round by AEK Larnaca after a 1–4 defeat away and a 2–1 home win, losing 3–5 on aggregate. The result dropped the club into the UEFA Europa Conference League play-offs, where Legia narrowly advanced past Hibernian F.C. 5–4 on aggregate following a 3–3 draw after extra time in Warsaw. The team went on to start the group stage with one win and one defeat before Iordănescu's departure.

However, the domestic campaign under Edward Iordănescu offered little improvement. In the league the team under-performed, reaching 10th place in the Ekstraklasa. His average points per match during his tenure amounted to 1.63. Critics pointed to inconsistent team selection, frequent tactical changes, and visible strain within the dressing-room. Observers also highlighted declines in key performance metrics such as running distances and physical intensity during matches. The combination of weak league results, tactical ambiguity and internal instability led media commentators to describe the project as failing “on almost every front – results, style, tactics, dressing-room management”.

Iordănescu parted company with Legia Warsaw on 31 October 2025 after a meeting between the club's leadership and the coach during the night of 30–31 October. The immediate trigger for his exit was the 2–1 defeat in the Polish Cup to Pogoń Szczecin.

== Personal life ==
Iordănescu dated Romanian singer-songwriter Delia Matache from 2005 to 2006. He is now married to a woman with whom he has three children.

Iordănescu and his father Anghel, as well as Mircea Lucescu and his son Răzvan, are the only known father–son pairings in football history in which both members have managed the same national team.

== Managerial statistics ==
As of match played 30 October 2025

Managerial record by team and tenure
Team	From	To	Record							
Team	From	To	P	W	D	L	GF	GA	GD	Win %
(Romania) Steaua București (caretaker)	20 September 2010	27 September 2010	2	1	0	1	1	1	+0	50.00
(Romania) Vaslui (caretaker)	24 September 2012	27 September 2012	1	0	0	1	0	1	−1	0.00
(Romania) Fortuna Brazi	11 January 2013	13 May 2013	10	8	2	0	25	6	+19	80.00
(Romania) ASA Târgu Mureș	20 June 2013	9 October 2013	6	2	2	2	8	8	+0	33.33
(Romania) Pandurii Târgu Jiu	16 December 2014	20 June 2016	59	27	17	15	83	62	+21	45.76
(Bulgaria) CSKA Sofia	25 August 2016	29 November 2016	12	5	3	4	14	9	+5	41.67
(Romania) Astra Giurgiu	8 June 2017	2 April 2018	35	15	10	10	46	33	+13	42.86
(Romania) CFR Cluj	13 June 2018	26 July 2018	3	1	1	1	2	2	+0	33.33
(Romania) Gaz Metan Mediaș	7 January 2019	1 June 2020	42	18	12	12	54	43	+11	42.86
(Romania) CFR Cluj	4 December 2020	2 June 2021	30	21	5	4	49	15	+34	70.00
(Romania) FCSB	18 August 2021	15 November 2021	11	8	2	1	24	11	+13	72.73
Romania	25 January 2022	22 July 2024	28	10	10	8	37	28	+9	35.71
(Poland) Legia Warsaw	12 June 2025	31 October 2025	24	11	6	7	33	29	+4	45.83
Total			263	127	70	66	376	248	+128	48.29

== Honours ==
=== Player ===
Steaua București

- Divizia A: 1995–96
- Cupa României: 1995–96

Petrolul Ploiești

- Divizia B: 2002–03

=== Coach ===
Pandurii Târgu Jiu

- Cupa Ligii runner-up: 2014–15

CFR Cluj

- Liga I: 2020–21
- Supercupa României: 2018, 2020

Legia Warsaw

- Polish Super Cup: 2025

Individual

- Gazeta Sporturilor Romania Coach of the Year: 2023, 2024
- Gala Fotbalului Românesc Romanian Coach of the Year: 2021
- Gazeta Sporturilor Romania Coach of the Month: November 2023

== See also ==
- List of European association football families
