= Dan Petrescu =

Romanian footballer and manager (born 1967)

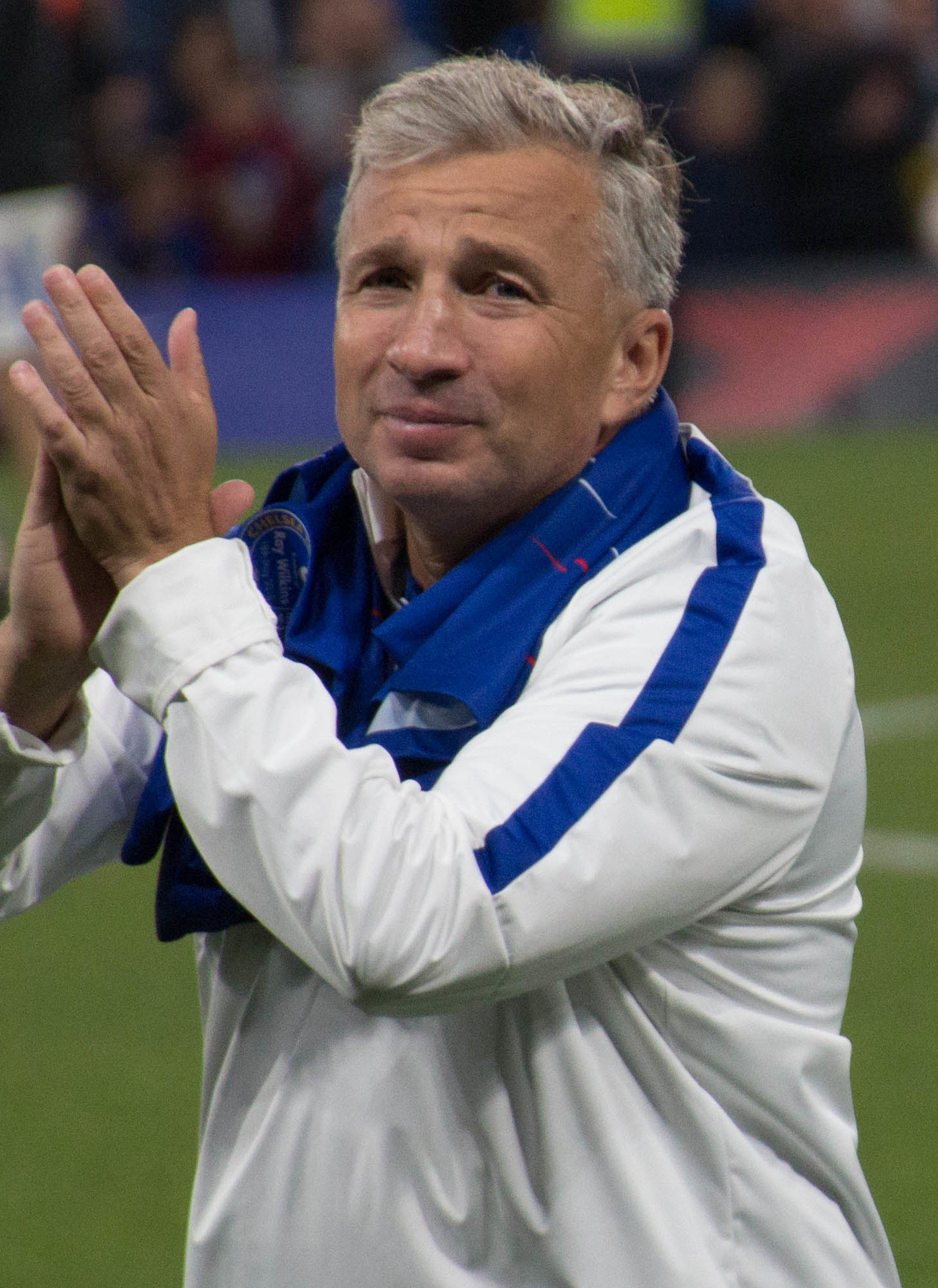
- Petrescu in 2018

Personal information
- Full name: Dan Vasile Petrescu
- Date of birth: 22 December 1967 (age 58)
- Place of birth: Bucharest, Romania
- Height: 1.77 m (5 ft 10 in)
- Positions: Full-back; winger

Youth career
- 1977–1986: Steaua București

Senior career*
Years	Team	Apps	(Gls)
1986–1991	Steaua București	95	(28)
1986–1987	→ Olt Scornicești (loan)	24	(0)
1991–1993	Foggia	55	(7)
1993–1994	Genoa	24	(1)
1994–1995	Sheffield Wednesday	37	(3)
1995–2000	Chelsea	150	(17)
2000	Bradford City	17	(1)
2001–2002	Southampton	11	(2)
2002–2003	Național București	20	(0)
Total		433	(59)

International career
1989–2000	Romania	95	(12)

Managerial career
- 2002–2003: Național București (player/assistant)
- 2003: Sportul Studențesc
- 2003–2004: Rapid București
- 2004–2005: Sportul Studențesc
- 2005–2006: Wisła Kraków
- 2006–2009: Unirea Urziceni
- 2009–2012: Kuban Krasnodar
- 2012–2014: Dynamo Moscow
- 2014: Al-Arabi
- 2015: ASA Târgu Mureș
- 2015–2016: Jiangsu Suning
- 2016: Kuban Krasnodar
- 2016–2017: Al-Nasr
- 2017–2018: CFR Cluj
- 2018–2019: Guizhou Hengfeng
- 2019–2020: CFR Cluj
- 2021: Kayserispor
- 2021–2023: CFR Cluj
- 2023–2024: Jeonbuk Hyundai Motors
- 2024–2025: CFR Cluj
- * Club domestic league appearances and goals

Dan Vasile Petrescu (Romanian pronunciation: [dan vaˈsile peˈtresku]; born 22 December 1967) is a Romanian professional football manager and former player.

As a player, Petrescu was deployed as a full-back or a winger and began his career at Steaua București, with which he played in the 1989 European Cup final. Abroad, he represented Serie A clubs Foggia and Genoa, before moving to the Premier League where he played for Sheffield Wednesday, Chelsea, Bradford City, and Southampton, respectively. With Chelsea, Petrescu won the 1998 UEFA Cup Winners' Cup. He earned 95 caps for the Romania national team, being selected in two World Cup squads, in 1994 and 1998, and in two European Championships, in 1996 and 2000.

Petrescu became player-assistant manager to Walter Zenga at Național București towards the end of his playing career, and has since had an extensive career as a head coach in Poland, Russia, the United Arab Emirates, Qatar, China, Turkey, and South Korea, in addition to his native country. His first job was at Sportul Studențesc, which he led to Liga I promotion. Petrescu has won domestic honours with Unirea Urziceni, Kuban Krasnodar, ASA Târgu Mureș, Jiangsu Suning, and CFR Cluj. He is the second-most successful manager in Romania, tied with Emerich Jenei, winning the league on six occasions (five times with CFR Cluj and once with Urziceni), and was also named Romania Coach of the Year a record five times, tied with Mircea Lucescu.

== Playing career ==
=== Club ===
After playing for Steaua București's youth teams, Petrescu was promoted into the first team in 1986 in a match played by Steaua just one month after winning the European Cup. He was loaned to Olt Scornicești for the 1986–87 season, but asked to return to Steaua in 1987.

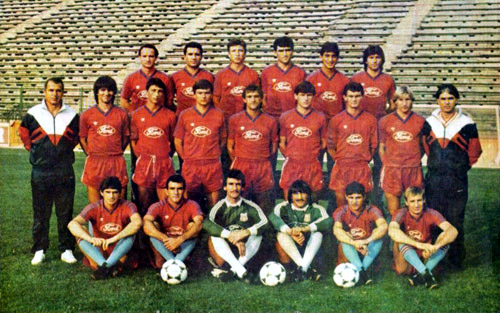
Petrescu (top row, third from left) with Steaua Bucharest in the 1988–89 season, when they reached the European Cup final

Petrescu was part of the Steaua squad that reached the European Cup semi-finals (1988) and the final (1989).

In 1991, Petrescu was bought by Italian club Foggia in a period when the club saw promotion to Serie A. In 1993, he moved to Genoa.

Petrescu signed for Sheffield Wednesday in 1994 from Genoa, after a successful 1994 World Cup for Romania. After one season at Hillsborough, he signed for Chelsea and featured prominently there for the next five years. During his term at Chelsea, he was a member of the teams which won the FA Cup in 1997 and the League Cup and Cup Winners' Cup (both in 1998). After falling out with Chelsea manager Gianluca Vialli after a defeat to Manchester United (a game in which he scored), Petrescu never played for the club again and was not even selected as a substitute for the 2000 FA Cup final against Aston Villa.

Turning down a move to Southampton in August 2000, he instead moved to Bradford City for £1 million, scoring one goal, against West Ham United.

In January 2001, Petrescu's former Chelsea manager, Glenn Hoddle, eventually persuaded him to join Southampton for a "nominal" fee. He initially settled in well at The Dell, scoring against Leicester City and Manchester City in his first few matches. In March, Hoddle left the Saints to take up the managerial reins at Tottenham Hotspur and his replacement, Stuart Gray, dropped Petrescu, replacing him with Hassan Kachloul for the remainder of the season. After making only two substitute appearances in the 2001–02 season, Petrescu was released and returned to Romania.

Petrescu returned to his native Bucharest for a last season as a footballer, with Național București. His last match was the Cupa României final, on 31 May 2003; Național lost 1–0 to Dinamo București, during which Petrescu received much abuse from some of the Dinamo fans as he left the pitch at the end of 90 minutes, even though it was the last game of one of Romania's greatest footballers. Presumably, this was because he used to play for Dinamo's greatest rivals, Steaua.

=== International ===
Petrescu registered 95 caps for the senior Romania national team. He made his debut in 1989 and played at four major tournaments: the 1994 World Cup, UEFA Euro 1996, the 1998 World Cup (where the entire Romania squad famously dyed their hair blonde after losing a bet with head coach Anghel Iordănescu), and Euro 2000.

Petrescu missed the 1990 World Cup due to injury. In 1994, Petrescu played in his first World Cup, held in the United States. He scored the only goal in a win against the United States which saw Romania qualify for the second round as group winners. They were then handed a difficult game against Argentina which they managed to win, only to lose to Sweden on penalties in the quarter-finals, with Petrescu one of two Romanians to miss his spot-kick. The miss still haunts him today. "It will probably stay with me for the rest of my life", he said. After the World Cup, he flew to Saint Thomas and spent two weeks in the Caribbean region.

Euro 1996 was a disappointment for Romania, as they lost all three group matches and only managed to score one goal.

At the 1998 World Cup in France, Petrescu raced past his Chelsea teammate Graeme Le Saux and scored the winning goal against England, which effectively won them the group and ensured they would not have to face Argentina in the second round. He became the second Romanian player to score in two different World Cups after Ștefan Dobay. The Romanians, however, lost their second round match to Croatia, 1–0, with the only goal coming from a penalty kick.

Petrescu was an important piece of the Romanian team at Euro 2000, where they survived a group with Portugal, Germany and England. A new victory over the English team was decisive to qualify for quarter-finals. Romania won all the matches where Petrescu scored.

== Managerial career ==
After retiring in 2003, Petrescu pursued a career as a coach. He began his managerial career in July 2003 with second division side Sportul Studențesc, whom he led to promotion before taking over at Rapid Bucharest in December, but stepped down in April 2004, after only six games and four months at the helm. He then returned for a second spell at Sportul Studențesc, where he helped the club to a seventh-place finish in Diviza A.

=== Wisła Kraków ===
In December 2005, Petrescu agreed to manage 2004–05 Ekstraklasa champions Wisła Kraków in Poland, replacing caretaker manager Tomasz Kulawik. Wisła finished second in the 2005–06 championship. He was dismissed as manager of Wisła on 18 September 2006 after unconvincing results to begin the 2006–07 season. Petrescu accused the Wisła players for not wanting to train hard to improve their performances.

=== Unirea Urziceni ===
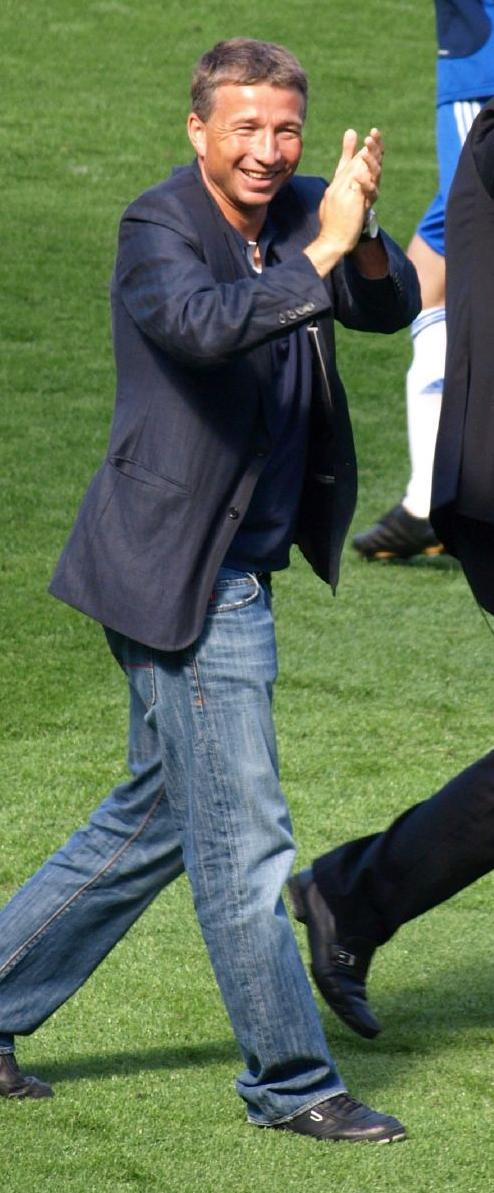
Petrescu in 2008

About one week after his termination, Petrescu was appointed as manager of Romanian Liga I newly promoted club Unirea Urziceni, with which he had considerable leading. Under his management, Unirea Urziceni was runner-up in the 2007–08 Cupa României and qualified for the 2008–09 UEFA Cup. He was considered for the vacant manager's position at his former club Steaua București after Marius Lăcătuș' resignation in October 2008. Dorinel Munteanu was appointed instead, but Petrescu has not ruled out a future role at the club. In May 2009, Petrescu won the Liga I title with outsiders Unirea Urziceni, the first title for both Petrescu and his club, and consequently achieving qualification to the 2009–10 UEFA Champions League, during which he led Unirea to a shock 4–1 victory at Ibrox against Rangers and a win against Sevilla at home, 1–0.

Petrescu resigned as manager of Unirea Urziceni in December 2009.

=== Kuban Krasnodar ===
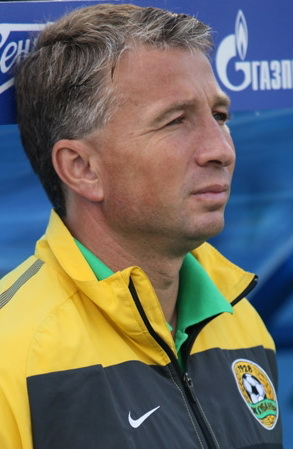
Petrescu with Kuban Krasnodar in 2011

On 28 December 2009, Russian First Division club Kuban Krasnodar hired Petrescu on a five-year contract. Petrescu managed to gain promotion to the Russian Premier League in his debut season, winning the 2010 Russian First Division with a total of 80 points, nine clear of second place. His team conceded only 20 goals in 38 matches.

On 14 August 2012, it was announced that Petrescu had resigned as Kuban Krasnodar manager, citing the need for a new challenge. Kuban later participated in the UEFA Europa League for the first time.

=== Dynamo Moscow ===
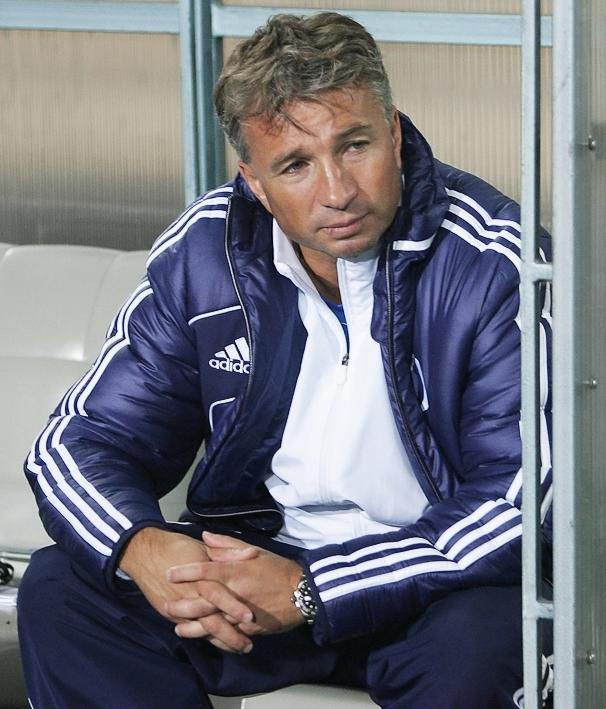
Petrescu as Dynamo Moscow manager in 2012

Shortly after his resignation, in August 2012 Petrescu signed a three-year contract reportedly worth €2.5 million per year to join Dynamo Moscow.

On 8 April 2014, his contract was terminated by mutual agreement after a heavy loss to outsiders Anzhi Makhachkala, 0–4. Dynamo Moscow director of sports Guram Adzhoyev stated, "Last year Dan drew the team from the complicated situation, lifted it to the certain level, but recently we have seen no progress."

=== Al-Arabi ===
In June 2014, Petrescu agreed to coach Qatari side Al-Arabi. On 1 December 2014, his contract with the club was terminated after a mutual agreement.

=== Târgu Mureș ===
On 10 June 2015, Petrescu was announced as the new manager of Liga I runner-up ASA Târgu Mureș. His first, and only, match in charge was in the Supercupa României against champions Steaua București ended with Târgu Mureș winning 1–0. He resigned the next day, to take up a lucrative contract with Chinese side Jiangsu Suning.

=== Jiangsu Suning ===
On 9 July 2015, Petrescu left Târgu Mureș, claiming his decision was due to the club's growing financial problems, though he was immediately hired as manager of Chinese Super League club Jiangsu Suning on a lucrative deal. Petrescu said in a statement, "It's very hard to leave the team in this moment. I don't how it'll be in China, I hope it will be like in Russia." In his first season in charge, Petrescu guided the club to victory in the 2015 Chinese FA Cup. On 3 June 2016, Suning announced that Petrescu will no longer be the manager of the club.

=== Kuban Krasnodar ===
On 14 June 2016, Petrescu signed a two-year contract with Kuban Krasnodar, after the club was relegated to the second-tier Russian National Football League. On 4 October 2016, with Kuban winning only 3 out of first 15 games and sitting in the 14th spot in the league instead of the expected fight for promotion, he left Kuban by mutual consent, stating that the club had not paid him.

On 29 October 2016, Petrescu was announced as the manager of Emirates Arabian Gulf League side Al-Nasr until the end of the season. He led the club to the final match of the UAE President's Cup but was defeated by Al-Wahda in his last game in charge. Al-Nasr appointed Cesare Prandelli as his replacement.

=== CFR Cluj ===
On 10 June 2017, he was appointed head coach of Liga I club CFR Cluj. On 20 May 2018, Cluj were crowned as Liga I champions for the 2017–18 season after a 1–0 victory over Viitorul Constanța.

=== Guizhou Hengfeng ===
On 7 June 2018, he was announced as the manager of Chinese club Guizhou Hengfeng to replace Gregorio Manzano.

=== Return to CFR Cluj ===
On 22 March 2019, Petrescu returned as manager of CFR Cluj after the club had experienced a string of poor performances in the league. He managed to win the 2018-19 Liga I title, successfully defending the trophy he won one year prior. The next season, CFR Cluj sought to have an ambitious European campaign, with the goal to qualify for the group stages of a European Competition. Petrescu guided his side to the 2019-20 Europa League group stage, after a loss in the 2019-20 Champions League playoffs against Slavia Praha, eliminating Scottish giants Celtic on the way. In the group stages, he faced Italian side SS Lazio, Stade Rennais and Celtic once again, proving to be an almost impossible challenge for CFR. However, with two wins over Stade Rennais and one win over Lazio and Celtic each, CFR finished second in the group stages and qualified for the knock-out phase of the Europa League. There, Petrescu met the competition's favourites Sevilla and were eliminated after a 1-1 and 0-0 draws. The team's performance in Europe was praised by Romanian media, and Petrescu himself claims it was one of the highlights of his career.

CFR were able to maintain their domestic domination, winning the regular season of the 2019-20 Liga I by a comfortable margin. However, the playoffs proved to be a much bigger challenge, as the COVID pandemic allowed Craiova to stabilize and pose a challenge to his side. While Craiova lead the standings for most of the playoff phase, following a win on CFR's ground and CFR's draws against Astra Giurgiu and Gaz Metan Medias, eventually CFR did manage to win the reverse fixture against Craiova on the last matchday, securing their third consecutive title.

On 19 August 2020, CFR started the European campaign against Maltese champions Floriana FC with a 2–0 victory but were eliminated in the second round by Dinamo Zagreb on penalties. Eventually, CFR did manage to qualify for the 2020-21 Europa League, eliminating Djurgårdens in the 3rd round and KuPS in the playoffs. Sadly, CFR could not repeat the previous season's European performance, as they finished third and were eliminated from the Europa League. Domestically, they lost form, playing unconvincing football and losing against Gaz Metan and UTA Arad at home. Petrescu announced on 30 November that he and the club had agreed to terminate his contract. He would be replaced by Edward Iordanescu, whom Petrescu would eventually replace himself a year or so later.

=== Third spell at CFR Cluj ===
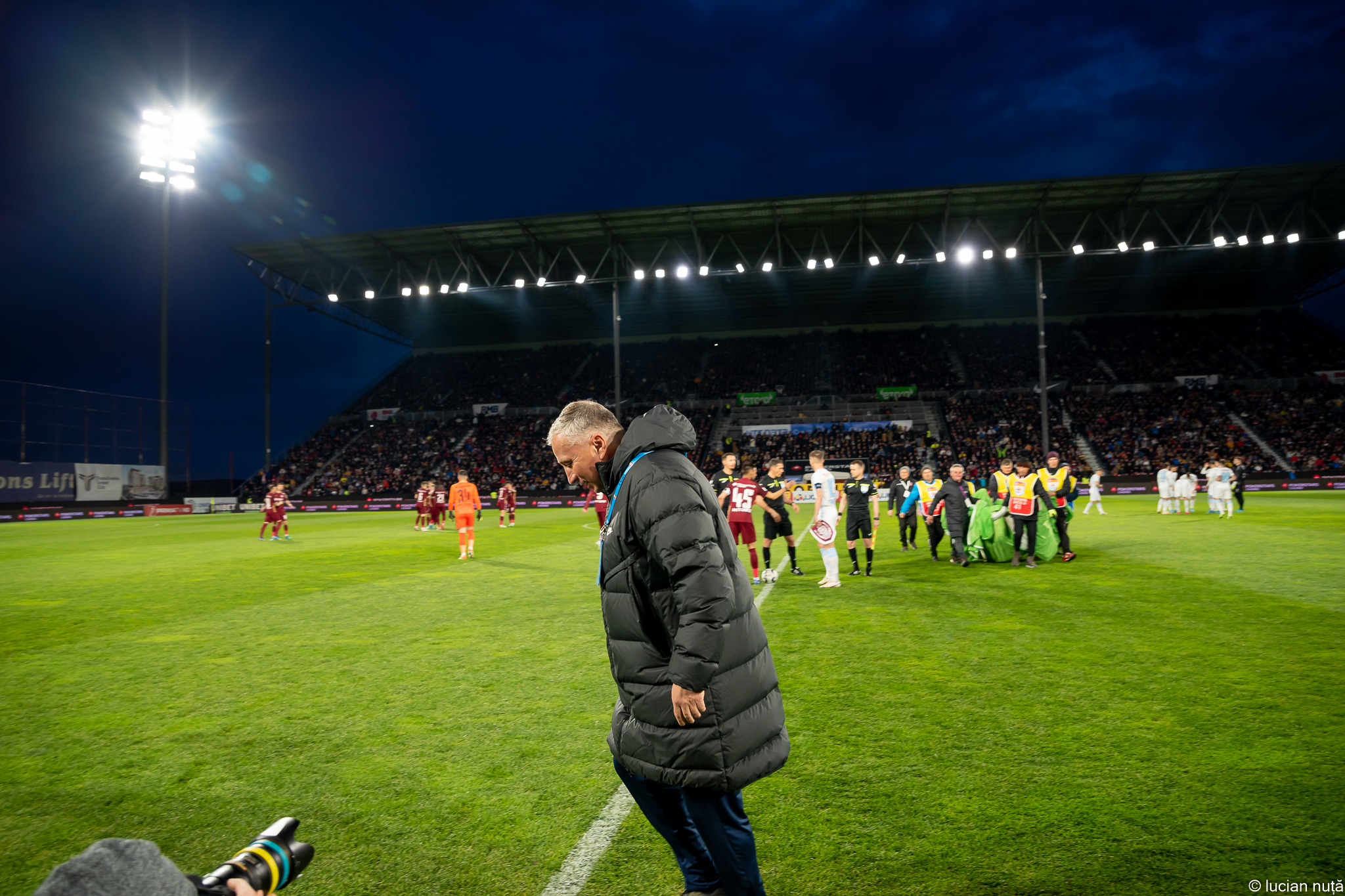
Petrescu during his third spell as head coach of CFR Cluj in 2022

On 28 August 2021, after a weak European campaign which saw the club fail to qualify for the Europa League, CFR Cluj's owner Nelutu Varga dismissed Marius Sumudica, and after few days of negotiations, Petrescu signed a contract on 31 August for a third stint at CFR Cluj. On 15 May 2022 Petrescu won his 4th league, and CFR's 5th consecutive championship after a 2–1 win over Universitatea Craiova, establishing the Hegemony of CFR Cluj in Romanian football.

=== Jeonbuk Hyundai Motors ===
On 9 June 2023, Petrescu was appointed as the head coach of K League 1 club Jeonbuk Hyundai Motors. On 6 April 2024, he stepped down after a five-game winless start.

=== A fourth chapter at CFR Cluj ===
On 15 April 2024, Petrescu agreed to return to CFR Cluj on a three-year contract, with an effective start in the summer of 2024, citing desire to rest after his spell in South Korea. However, on 30 April, Petrescu announced his decision to cancel his break, and took charge of the club for the fourth time, replacing interim manager Ovidiu Hoban. He made his return to Romanian football on 5 May, leading Cluj to a 3–2 win over Rapid București.

In the 2024–25 season, Petrescu led CFR to his first cup win and 6th overall trophy, winning the 2024–25 Cupa României, 3–2 against FC Hermannstadt, making him the most decorated manager in CFR's history.

On 21 August 2025, following a humiliating 2–7 away loss against Häcken in the 2025–26 UEFA Conference League play-off, his worst ever defeat in his 20-year managerial career, Petrescu resigned as CFR Cluj head coach, citing health reasons and a desire to take a longer break from football.

== Personal life ==
Petrescu was married to Daniela Carmen from 1992 to 2003, with whom he has two daughters: Rebecca (born 1994) and Beatrice Chelsea (born 1998). He named one of his daughters "Chelsea" in honour of one of his former clubs. In May 2007, he married Adriana Stan, a former athlete. The couple have a daughter together, Jennifer, born in 2008.

In January 2026 it was reported that Petrescu had been diagnosed with cancer; he was undergoing chemotherapy but was said to be in a "very serious condition". Later that month it was reported that Petrescu did not have cancer.

== Career statistics ==
=== Club ===
Appearances and goals by club, season and competition
Club	Season	League			National cup (Note: Includes Cupa României, Coppa Italia, FA Cup)		League cup (Note: Includes Football League Cup)		Continental		Other		Total	
Club	Season	Division	Apps	Goals	Apps	Goals	Apps	Goals	Apps	Goals	Apps	Goals	Apps	Goals
Steaua București	1985–86	Divizia A	2	0	0	0	–		0	0	–		2	0
Steaua București	1987–88	Divizia A	11	1	1	0	–		1	0	–		13	1
Steaua București	1988–89	Divizia A	28	5	2	0	–		8 (Note: Appearances in European Cup)	1	–		38	6
Steaua București	1989–90	Divizia A	23	9	3	1	–		4	1	–		30	11
Steaua București	1990–91	Divizia A	31	13	3	2	–		3 (Note: Appearances in UEFA Cup Winners' Cup)	2	–		37	17
Steaua București	Total		95	28	9	3	–		16	4	–		120	35
Olt Scornicești (loan)	1986–87	Divizia A	24	0	1	0	–		–		–		25	0
Foggia	1991–92	Serie A	25	4	2	0	–		–		–		27	4
Foggia	1992–93	Serie A	30	3	4	0	–		–		–		34	3
Foggia	Total		55	7	6	0	–		–		–		61	7
Genoa	1993–94	Serie A	24	1	1	0	–		–		–		25	1
Sheffield Wednesday	1994–95	Premier League	29	3	2	0	2	0	–		–		33	3
Sheffield Wednesday	1995–96	Premier League	8	0	0	0	0	0	–		–		8	0
Sheffield Wednesday	Total		37	3	2	0	2	0	–		–		41	3
Chelsea	1995–96	Premier League	24	2	7	1	0	0	–		–		31	3
Chelsea	1996–97	Premier League	34	3	5	0	2	1	–		–		41	4
Chelsea	1997–98	Premier League	31	5	1	0	3	1	7	2	1 (Note: Appearance in FA Community Shield)	0	43	8
Chelsea	1998–99	Premier League	32	4	4	0	3	0	6	0	–		45	4
Chelsea	1999–2000	Premier League	29	4	3	0	0	0	15 (Note: Appearances in UEFA Champions League)	1	–		47	5
Chelsea	Total		150	18	20	1	8	2	28	3	1	0	207	24
Bradford City	2000–01	Premier League	17	1	1	0	2	0	–		–		20	1
Southampton	2000–01	Premier League	9	2	0	0	0	0	–		–		9	2
Southampton	2001–02	Premier League	2	0	0	0	0	0	–		–		2	0
Southampton	Total		11	2	0	0	0	0	–		–		11	2
National București	2002–03	Divizia A	20	0	5	0	–		6	0	–		31	0
Career total			433	60	45	4	12	2	50	7	1	0	541	73

=== International ===
Appearances and goals by national team and year
National team	Year	Apps	Goals
Romania	1989	5	0
Romania	1990	8	1
Romania	1991	5	0
Romania	1992	6	1
Romania	1993	4	0
Romania	1994	15	3
Romania	1995	6	0
Romania	1996	8	3
Romania	1997	8	2
Romania	1998	13	2
Romania	1999	8	0
Romania	2000	9	0
Total		95	12

Scores and results list Romania's goal tally first, score column indicates score after each Petrescu goal.

List of international goals scored by Dan Petrescu
No.	Date	Venue	Opponent	Score	Result	Competition
1	5 December 1990	Stadionul Naţional, Bucharest, Romania	San Marino	6–0	6–0	UEFA Euro 1992 qualifying
2	4 August 1992	Stadionul Steaua, Bucharest, Romania	Latvia	2–0	2–0	Friendly
3	25 May 1994	Stadionul Steaua, Bucharest, Romania	Nigeria	2–0	2–0	Friendly
4	26 June 1994	Rose Bowl, Pasadena, United States	United States	1–0	1–0	1994 FIFA World Cup
5	7 September 1994	Stadionul Steaua, Bucharest, Romania	Azerbaijan	2–0	3–0	UEFA Euro 1996 qualifying
6	1 June 1996	Stadionul Steaua, Bucharest, Romania	Moldova	1–0	3–1	Friendly
7	31 August 1996	Stadionul Steaua, Bucharest, Romania	Lithuania	2–0	3–0	1998 FIFA World Cup qualification
8	9 October 1996	Laugardalsvöllur, Reykjavík, Iceland	Iceland	4–0	4–0	1998 FIFA World Cup qualification
9	29 March 1997	Stadionul Steaua, Bucharest, Romania	Liechtenstein	5–0	8–0	1998 FIFA World Cup qualification
10	10 September 1997	Stadionul Steaua, Bucharest, Romania	Iceland	2–0	4–0	1998 FIFA World Cup qualification
11	6 June 1998	Ilie Oană Stadium, Ploiești, Romania	Moldova	2–0	5–1	Friendly
12	22 June 1998	Stadium Municipal, Toulouse, France	England	2–1	2–1	1998 FIFA World Cup

=== Managerial record ===
As of match updated 21 August 2025

Team	Nat	From	To	Record					Ref.
Team	Nat	From	To	M	W	D	L	Win %	Ref.
Sportul Studențesc	(Romania)	20 July 2003	3 December 2003	22	16	3	3	72.73	
Rapid București	(Romania)	8 December 2003	14 April 2004	7	3	2	2	42.86	
Sportul Studențesc	(Romania)	17 June 2004	5 December 2005	50	21	13	16	42.00	
Wisła Kraków	(Poland)	7 December 2005	18 September 2006	23	14	6	3	60.87	
Unirea Urziceni	(Romania)	25 September 2006	26 December 2009	130	64	36	30	49.23	
Kuban Krasnodar	(Russia)	28 December 2009	14 August 2012	88	41	24	23	46.59	
Dynamo Moscow	(Russia)	17 August 2012	8 April 2014	55	28	14	13	50.91	
Al-Arabi	(Qatar)	5 June 2014	1 December 2014	11	3	5	3	27.27	
ASA Târgu Mureș	(Romania)	10 June 2015	9 July 2015	1	1	0	0	100.00	
Jiangsu Suning	(China)	12 July 2015	3 June 2016	36	15	12	9	41.67	
Kuban Krasnodar	(Russia)	14 June 2016	4 October 2016	16	3	7	6	18.75	
Al Nasr	(United Arab Emirates)	29 October 2016	26 May 2017	26	13	5	8	50.00	
CFR Cluj	(Romania)	10 June 2017	4 June 2018	37	23	10	4	62.16	
Guizhou Hengfeng	(China)	7 June 2018	21 March 2019	23	7	4	12	30.43	
CFR Cluj	(Romania)	22 March 2019	30 November 2020	90	47	23	20	52.22	
Kayserispor	(Turkey)	11 January 2021	23 February 2021	8	2	3	3	25.00	
CFR Cluj	(Romania)	31 August 2021	8 June 2023	103	55	22	26	53.40	
Jeonbuk Hyundai Motors	(South Korea)	9 June 2023	5 April 2024	38	15	11	12	39.47	
CFR Cluj	(Romania)	30 April 2024	22 August 2025	69	33	23	13	47.83	
Total				833	407	221	205	48.86	—

== Honours ==
=== Player ===
Steaua București

- Divizia A: 1985–86, 1987–88, 1988–89
- Cupa României: 1988–89
- European Cup runner-up: 1988–89

Chelsea

- FA Cup: 1996–97
- Football League Cup: 1997–98
- UEFA Cup Winners' Cup: 1997–98
- UEFA Super Cup: 1998

Național București

- Cupa României runner-up: 2002–03

Individual

- Overseas Team of the Decade – Premier League 10 Seasons Awards (1993 to 2003)

=== Manager ===
Unirea Urziceni

- Liga I: 2008–09
- Cupa României runner-up : 2007–08

Kuban Krasnodar

- Russian First Division: 2010

ASA Târgu Mureș

- Supercupa României: 2015

Jiangsu Suning

- Chinese FA Cup: 2015

CFR Cluj

- Liga I: 2017–18, 2018–19, 2019–20, 2020–21, 2021–22
- Cupa României: 2024–25

Jeonbuk Hyundai Motors

- Korean FA Cup runner-up: 2023

Individual

- Romania Coach of the Year: 2008, 2009, 2011, 2019, 2022
