= Adrian Negrău =

Romanian footballer (born 1980)

Personal information
- Date of birth: 17 March 1968 (age 58)
- Place of birth: Arad, Romania
- Height: 1.84 m (6 ft 0 in)
- Position: Striker

Senior career*
Years	Team	Apps	(Gls)
1985–1988	UTA Arad		
1989–1990	Steaua București	37	(8)
1990–1991	Bihor Oradea	17	(2)
1991–1993	Kispesti Honvéd	49	(13)
1993–1994	Budapesti VSC	21	(3)
1994	Bihor Oradea	12	(3)
1995	UTA Arad	7	(0)
1995–1998	Haladás	68	(20)
1998–2001	Békéscsaba	77	(17)
2003–2004	Victoria Mailat		
2004–2005	AS Voința Zăgrani		
Total		288	(66)
- * Club domestic league appearances and goals

Adrian Negrău (born 17 March 1968) is a Romanian former football striker. He was part of Steaua's team that reached the 1989 European Cup final, in which he was an unused substitute.

== Honours ==
Steaua București

- Divizia A: 1988–89
- Cupa României: 1988–89
- European Cup runner-up: 1988–89

Kispesti Honvéd

- Nemzeti Bajnokság I: 1992–93
