= Bogdan Lobonț =

Romanian footballer and coach (born 1978)

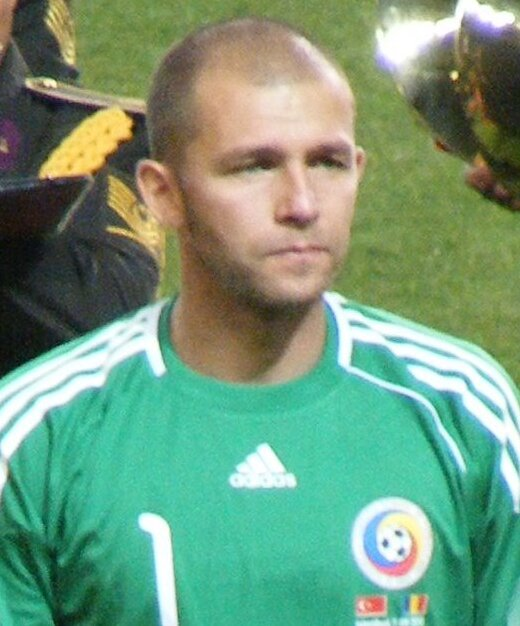
- Lobonț with Romania in 2010

Personal information
- Full name: Bogdan Ionuț Lobonț
- Date of birth: 18 January 1978 (age 48)
- Place of birth: Hunedoara, Romania
- Height: 1.84 m (6 ft 0 in)
- Position: Goalkeeper

Youth career
- 1988–1995: Corvinul Hunedoara

Senior career*
| Years | Team | Apps | (Gls) |
| 1995–1997 | Corvinul Hunedoara | 40 | (0) |
| 1997–2000 | Rapid București | 80 | (0) |
| 2000–2006 | Ajax | 49 | (0) |
| 2002 | → Dinamo București (loan) | 22 | (0) |
| 2006–2007 | Fiorentina | 17 | (0) |
| 2007–2010 | Dinamo București | 71 | (0) |
| 2009–2010 | → Roma (loan) | 2 | (0) |
| 2010–2018 | Roma | 20 | (0) |
| Total | | 301 | (0) |

International career
| 1997–1998 | Romania U21 | 10 | (0) |
| 1998–2018 | Romania | 86 | (0) |

Managerial career
- 2019: Universitatea Cluj
- 2019: Romania (assistant)
- 2020–2021: Roma (scout)
- 2021–2022: Romania U20
- 2023–2024: Rapid București (GK coach)
- 2024: Rapid București (caretaker)
- 2024: Rapid București (assistant)
- 2025: CSM Olimpia Satu Mare (technical director)
- * Club domestic league appearances and goals

Bogdan Ionuț Lobonț (Romanian pronunciation: [boɡˈdan joˈnuts loˈbonts]; born 18 January 1978) is a Romanian professional football coach and former player who played as a goalkeeper.

He amassed 86 appearances for the Romania national team between 1998 and 2018, representing the country in two European Championships. He was popularly nicknamed Pisica ("The Cat") in Romania, due to his quick reflexes and relative small body frame for a goalkeeper.

== Club career ==
=== Corvinul Hunedoara ===
Lobonț was born on 18 January 1978 in Hunedoara, Romania and began playing junior-level football at age 12 at local club Corvinul under the guidance of coach Marian Ioniță. He started to play at senior level during the 1995–96 Divizia B season when coach Gabriel Stan used him in a 1–1 draw against Suceava, delivering an appreciated performance. In the following season, he appeared more often, helping the club finish in seventh place.

=== Rapid București ===
In 1997, Rică Răducanu noticed his talent after watching a training session of Corvinul, then recommended him to Rapid București's manager, Mircea Lucescu. Lobonț made his Divizia A debut on 2 August 1997, keeping a clean sheet in a 0–0 draw against Ceahlăul Piatra Neamț. At the end of his first season at Rapid, he won the first trophy of his career, the 1997–98 Cupa României, being used the entire match by Lucescu in the final where he kept a clean sheet in the 1–0 win over Universitatea Craiova. In the following season he made 31 appearances in the league as the club won the title. During the middle of the 1999–2000 season, he was sold by Rapid to Ajax for $3 million.

=== Ajax Amsterdam and Dinamo București ===
Lobonț made his Ajax debut on 26 November 2000 when coach Co Adriaanse sent him in the 18th minute of an away Eredivisie match against Utrecht to replace Shota Arveladze because the starting goalkeeper, Fred Grim, received a red card. Eventually, he conceded two goals and the match ended with a 2–1 loss.

He was loaned by Ajax to Dinamo București for the 2001–02 season. There, Lobonț was used by coaches Cornel Dinu and Marin Ion in 22 league games—and he kept a clean sheet in a 2–0 win in the derby against Steaua București—helping the squad win the title, while being the team's first choice goalkeeper in front of Florin Prunea. Lobonț also played in the 2–1 loss to his former team, Rapid in the 2002 Cupa României final.

Upon his return to Ajax, he became the team's primary goalkeeper. Lobonț played four games in the 2002–03 Champions League second group stage against Arsenal, Valencia and Roma which were draws, and he conceded only three goals, helping the team qualify for the quarter-finals. In the quarter-finals, they met AC Milan. After managing to keep a clean sheet in the first leg's draw, Ajax was close to semi-final qualification in the second leg. However, in stoppage time, Filippo Inzaghi burst clear to reach a flick-on and lifted the ball over Lobonț and Jon Dahl Tomasson then touched the ball over the line, securing a 3–2 victory against Ajax for the eventual competition winners. In the next season, he was used by coach Ronald Koeman in 24 league games as Ajax won the title. In the same season, he played six games in the Champions League group stage, keeping two clean sheets in victories against Club Brugge and Celta Vigo but they lost the other games, finishing the group in last place. In the following year and a half, he played rarely but still made two appearances in the 2004–05 Champions League group stage, a 3–0 home win over Maccabi Tel Aviv and a 4–0 away loss to Bayern Munich.

Lobonț's performances at Ajax were also limited by injuries and competition with Maarten Stekelenburg. During his spell with the Sons of the Gods, he was teammates with fellow Romanians Cristian Chivu and Nicolae Mitea, and also developed a good friendship with Zlatan Ibrahimović.

=== Fiorentina ===
In January 2006, Lobonț was transferred from Ajax to Italian Serie A club Fiorentina for €1.5 million as The Violets needed a goalkeeper after the injury of Sébastien Frey. He made his Serie A debut on 29 January when coach Cesare Prandelli sent him in the 59th minute to replace Gianluca Berti, and managed not to concede a goal in the 0–0 draw against Udinese. Lobonț played regularly until the end of the season, but in the first half of the following season he ceased to play as Frey recovered from his injury. During his final six months spent at the club, he was teammates with compatriot Adrian Mutu.

=== Return to Dinamo București ===
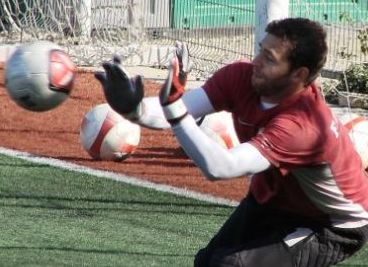
Lobonț during a Dinamo București training session in 2007

Because he had lost his place in the national team, Lobonț made a surprise move back to Dinamo București in January 2007, which paid €750,000 for his transfer, and he also accepted a much lower salary, earning €545,000 less than the contract with the Italians. He was used in 14 league games by coach Mircea Rednic in the second half of the 2006–07 season as the club won the title. He also appeared in both legs of the 3–1 loss on aggregate to Benfica in the round of 32 of the 2006–07 UEFA Cup. In the following season, Dinamo aimed to reach the Champions League group stage, and in the 1–1 draw in the first leg of the third qualifying round against Lazio Roma, Lobonț saved a penalty kick executed by Tommaso Rocchi. However, the qualification was lost after the 3–1 defeat in the second leg. For his 2007 performances, Lobonț was placed second in the ranking for the Romanian Footballer of the Year award, behind Adrian Mutu.

=== Roma ===
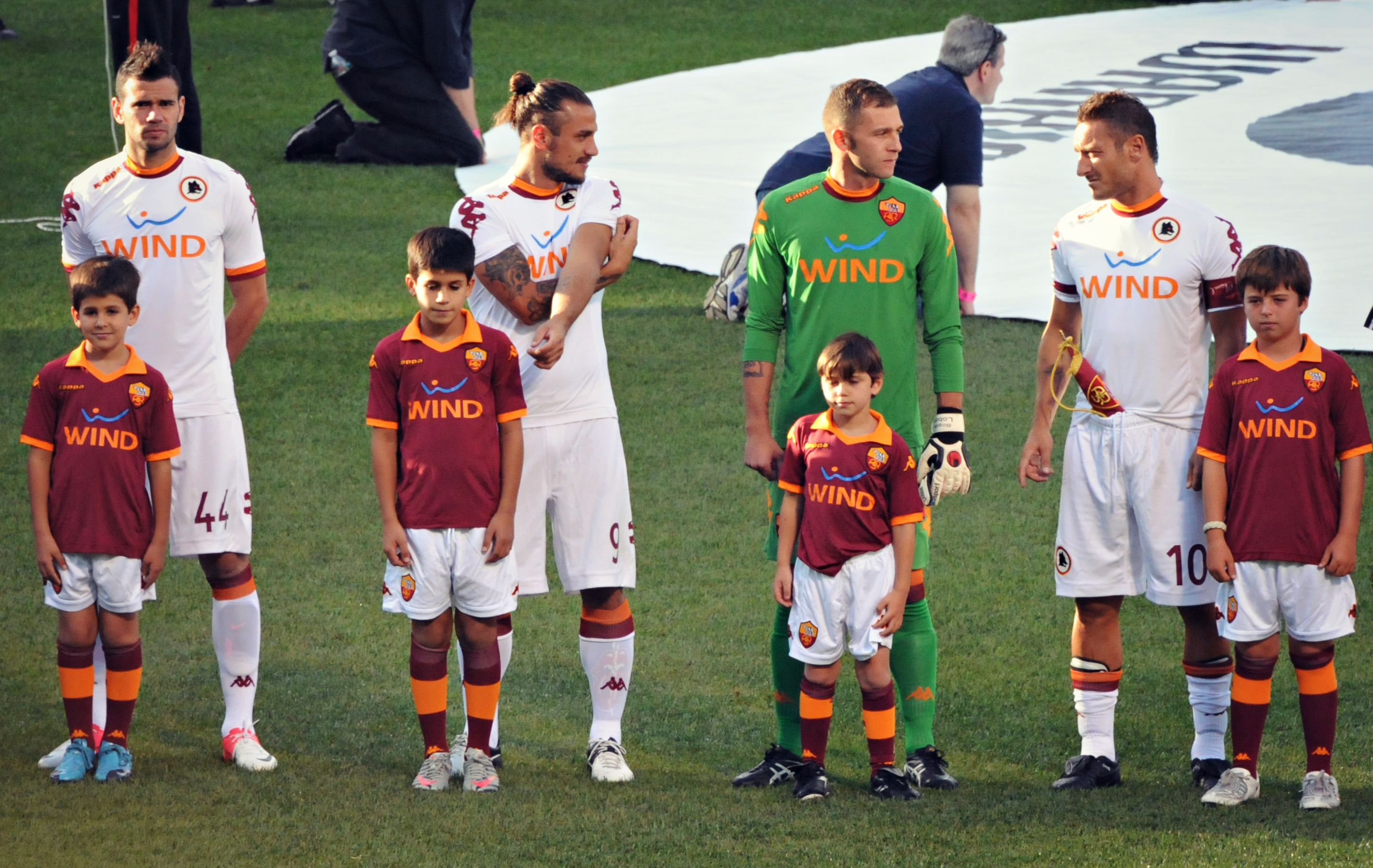
Lobonț (in green) alongside Leandro Castán, Dani Osvaldo and Francesco Totti of AS Roma ahead of their friendly match against Liverpool at Fenway Park in Boston, Massachusetts, on 25 July 2012

On 31 August 2009, Italian Serie A club Roma signed Lobonț in a co-ownership deal from Dinamo, with an option for the club to buy him outright at the end of the season, for a fee of €1.5 million. He made his first appearance for the Giallorossi on 4 October, coming off the bench after 23 minutes to replace injured Júlio Sérgio in a 2–1 win over Napoli, conceding a goal from Ezequiel Lavezzi shortly after entering the field. His second appearance was in a 3–0 victory against CSKA Sofia in the 2009–10 Europa League group stage for which he was praised by the Italian press. Lobonț started the following season by playing under coach Claudio Ranieri in the 3–1 loss to Inter Milan in Supercoppa Italiana. Afterwards, he made three appearances in the 2010–11 Champions League group stage, consisting of a victory and a draw against CFR Cluj but also a loss to Basel.

On 4 March 2012, he came on in a derby against Lazio because of Maarten Stekelenburg's red card, conceding two goals in a match they eventually lost 2–1. Due to Stekelenburg's injury, he served as the temporary starting goalkeeper for seven games in the 2011–12 season. In the 2012–13 Coppa Italia, the team reached the final where coach Aurelio Andreazzoli used him in the 1–0 loss to Lazio.

On 1 July 2013, Lobonț signed a new three-year contract with Roma which would keep him at the club until 2016. Even though he had not featured in a Roma match for about four years, in 2016 he extended his contract with the team yet again, making Roma the last team of his playing career.

== International career ==
Between 1997 and 1998, Lobonț made 10 appearances for Romania's under-21 team. During this time, he was part of the squad that managed a first-ever qualification to a European Championship in 1998, which Romania subsequently hosted. In the final tournament that was composed of eight teams, coach Victor Pițurcă used him in all three games which were losses to Netherlands, Germany and Russia, as they finished in last place.

Lobonț played 86 matches for Romania, making his debut on 2 September 1998 when coach Pițurcă sent him in the 82nd minute to replace Bogdan Stelea in a 7–0 victory over Liechtenstein in the successful Euro 2000 qualifiers. In those qualifiers he would make three further appearances as a starter in three victories, two over Azerbaijan and one against Hungary, keeping a clean sheet in all of them. He was selected by coach Emerich Jenei to be part of the squad that participated in the Euro 2000 final tournament, but did not play in any games there.

In the following years, he appeared in three games during the 2002 World Cup qualifiers, including another win with a clean sheet kept over rivals Hungary, and then played in four games in the Euro 2004 qualifiers, conceding three goals, two of which were from penalty kicks. Afterwards, Lobonț established himself as a key member for Romania, appearing in 11 games during the 2006 World Cup qualifiers. Subsequently, he played in 10 matches in the successful Euro 2008 qualifiers where he conceded only six goals, keeping four clean sheets, including one in a historical 1–0 home win over Netherlands. In the final tournament, he was used by Pițurcă for the entirety of all three group stage matches. These were a 0–0 draw against World Cup finalists France, followed by a praised performance in the 1–1 draw against World Champions Italy, and the 2–0 loss to Netherlands as the campaign ended.

After playing five games, in which he conceded 10 goals in the 2010 World Cup qualifiers, he appeared in only one during the Euro 2012 qualifiers. Then he played four matches in the 2014 World Cup qualifiers, including a 3–1 loss to Greece in the qualification play-off, after which he retired from the national team. When former teammate Cosmin Contra became coach, Lobonț returned for one final game on 5 June 2018, entering the field to replace Ciprian Tătărușanu for the final minutes of a 2–0 friendly win against Finland at the Ilie Oană Stadium in Ploiești.

On 25 March 2008, he was decorated by the president of Romania, Traian Băsescu, for his performances in the Euro 2008 qualifiers, receiving the Medalia "Meritul Sportiv" – ("The Sportive Merit" Medal) class III.

== Managerial career ==
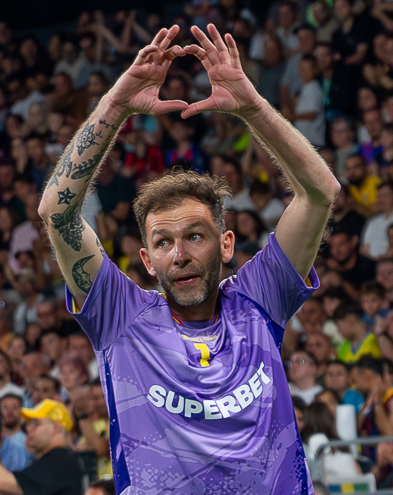
Lobonț greeting fans at the BTarena in 2025.

Lobonț started coaching in January 2019 at Liga II side Universitatea Cluj, finishing the season in third place, and then played a promotion play-off against FC Hermannstadt which was lost with 3–0 on aggregate.

Afterwards, he worked as Cosmin Contra's assistant at Romania's national team for a few months, then he was a scout for Roma. Lobonț left Roma to coach Romania's under-20 side for about a year in friendly matches, gaining three 2–1 victories over Poland, Czech Republic and Portugal, but also suffering some severe defeats, such as 1–6 to England, 0–7 against Italy and 0–5 to Switzerland.

In August 2023, he got appointed as the goalkeeper coach of Rapid București. By the end of the 2023–24 season, after head coach Cristiano Bergodi was dismissed, Lobonț was selected to lead the team for the final rounds of the season. However, his spell was unsuccessful, as the team lost four matches, drew one and earned only one victory in the last round in a derby against FCSB. After Neil Lennon was appointed head coach of Rapid, he remained in his staff as an assistant, but after a poor start in the 2024–25 season, Lennon was replaced with Marius Șumudică and Lobonț left the club.

== Career statistics ==
=== Club ===
Appearances and goals by club, season and competition
| Club | Season | League | | | National Cup (Note: Includes Cupa României, KNVB Beker, Coppa Italia) | | Europe | | Other | | Total | |
| Club | Season | Division | Apps | Goals | Apps | Goals | Apps | Goals | Apps | Goals | Apps | Goals |
|---|---|---|---|---|---|---|---|---|---|---|---|---|
| Corvinul Hunedoara | 1995–96 | Divizia B | 6 | 0 | 0 | 0 | — | | — | | 6 | 0 |
| Corvinul Hunedoara | 1996–97 | Divizia B | 34 | 0 | 0 | 0 | — | | — | | 34 | 0 |
| Corvinul Hunedoara | Total | | 40 | 0 | 0 | 0 | — | | — | | 40 | 0 |
| Rapid București | 1997–98 | Divizia A | 33 | 0 | 4 | 0 | 4 (Note: Appearance in the UEFA Intertoto Cup) | 0 | — | | 41 | 0 |
| Rapid București | 1998–99 | Divizia A | 31 | 0 | 5 | 0 | 3 (Note: Appearances in the UEFA Cup Winners' Cup) | 0 | 1 (Note: Appearance in the Supercupa României) | 0 | 40 | 0 |
| Rapid București | 1999–00 | Divizia A | 16 | 0 | 2 | 0 | 2 (Note: Appearances in the UEFA Champions League) | 0 | 0 | 0 | 20 | 0 |
| Rapid București | Total | | 80 | 0 | 11 | 0 | 9 | 0 | 1 | 0 | 101 | 0 |
| Ajax | 1999–00 | Eredivisie | 0 | 0 | 0 | 0 | — | | — | | 0 | 0 |
| Ajax | 2000–01 | Eredivisie | 1 | 0 | 0 | 0 | 0 | 0 | — | | 1 | 0 |
| Ajax | 2001–02 | Eredivisie | 0 | 0 | 0 | 0 | 0 | 0 | — | | 0 | 0 |
| Ajax | 2002–03 | Eredivisie | 17 | 0 | 3 | 0 | 6 | 0 | 0 | 0 | 26 | 0 |
| Ajax | 2003–04 | Eredivisie | 24 | 0 | 1 | 0 | 7 | 0 | — | | 32 | 0 |
| Ajax | 2004–05 | Eredivisie | 7 | 0 | 0 | 0 | 2 | 0 | 0 | 0 | 9 | 0 |
| Ajax | 2005–06 | Eredivisie | 0 | 0 | 0 | 0 | 0 | 0 | 0 | 0 | 0 | 0 |
| Ajax | Total | | 49 | 0 | 4 | 0 | 15 | 0 | 0 | 0 | 68 | 0 |
| Dinamo București (loan) | 2001–02 | Divizia A | 22 | 0 | 6 | 0 | — | | — | | 28 | 0 |
| Fiorentina | 2005–06 | Serie A | 17 | 0 | — | | — | | — | | 17 | 0 |
| Fiorentina | 2006–07 | Serie A | 0 | 0 | 0 | 0 | — | | — | | 0 | 0 |
| Fiorentina | Total | | 17 | 0 | 0 | 0 | — | | — | | 17 | 0 |
| Dinamo București | 2006–07 | Liga I | 14 | 0 | — | | 2 (Note: Appearances in the UEFA Cup) | 0 | — | | 16 | 0 |
| Dinamo București | 2007–08 | Liga I | 32 | 0 | 1 | 0 | 4 (Note: Two appearances in the UEFA Champions League and two appearances in the UEFA Cup) | 0 | 1 | 0 | 38 | 0 |
| Dinamo București | 2008–09 | Liga I | 25 | 0 | 1 | 0 | 2 | 0 | — | | 28 | 0 |
| Dinamo București | Total | | 71 | 0 | 2 | 0 | 8 | 0 | 1 | 0 | 82 | 0 |
| Roma (loan) | 2009–10 | Serie A | 2 | 0 | 0 | 0 | 1 (Note: Appearance in the UEFA Europa League) | 0 | — | | 3 | 0 |
| Roma | 2010–11 | Serie A | 6 | 0 | 0 | 0 | 3 | 0 | 1 (Note: Appearance in the Supercoppa Italiana) | 0 | 10 | 0 |
| Roma | 2011–12 | Serie A | 9 | 0 | 0 | 0 | 0 | 0 | — | | 9 | 0 |
| Roma | 2012–13 | Serie A | 5 | 0 | 1 | 0 | — | | — | | 6 | 0 |
| Roma | 2013–14 | Serie A | 0 | 0 | 0 | 0 | — | | — | | 0 | 0 |
| Roma | 2014–15 | Serie A | 0 | 0 | 0 | 0 | 0 | 0 | — | | 0 | 0 |
| Roma | 2015–16 | Serie A | 0 | 0 | 0 | 0 | 0 | 0 | — | | 0 | 0 |
| Roma | 2016–17 | Serie A | 0 | 0 | 0 | 0 | 0 | 0 | — | | 0 | 0 |
| Roma | 2017–18 | Serie A | 0 | 0 | 0 | 0 | 0 | 0 | — | | 0 | 0 |
| Roma | Total | | 22 | 0 | 1 | 0 | 4 | 0 | 1 | 0 | 28 | 0 |
| Career total | | | 301 | 0 | 24 | 0 | 36 | 0 | 3 | 0 | 364 | 0 |

=== International ===
Appearances and goals by national team and year
| National team | Year | Apps | Goals |
|---|---|---|---|
| Romania | 1998 | 1 | 0 |
| Romania | 1999 | 5 | 0 |
| Romania | 2000 | 8 | 0 |
| Romania | 2001 | 3 | 0 |
| Romania | 2002 | 3 | 0 |
| Romania | 2003 | 9 | 0 |
| Romania | 2004 | 7 | 0 |
| Romania | 2005 | 8 | 0 |
| Romania | 2006 | 6 | 0 |
| Romania | 2007 | 11 | 0 |
| Romania | 2008 | 10 | 0 |
| Romania | 2009 | 3 | 0 |
| Romania | 2010 | 4 | 0 |
| Romania | 2011 | 0 | 0 |
| Romania | 2012 | 4 | 0 |
| Romania | 2013 | 3 | 0 |
| Romania | 2014 | 0 | 0 |
| Romania | 2015 | 0 | 0 |
| Romania | 2016 | 0 | 0 |
| Romania | 2017 | 0 | 0 |
| Romania | 2018 | 1 | 0 |
| Total | | 86 | 0 |

== Managerial statistics ==
As of 10 May 2024

| Team | From | To | Record | | | | | | | |
| Team | From | To | G | W | D | L | GF | GA | GD | Win % |
|---|---|---|---|---|---|---|---|---|---|---|
| (Romania) Universitatea Cluj | 8 November 2018 | 14 June 2019 | 19 | 13 | 2 | 4 | 39 | 13 | +26 | 68.42 |
| Romania U20 | 10 August 2021 | 30 June 2022 | 8 | 3 | 0 | 5 | 8 | 27 | −19 | 37.50 |
| (Romania) Rapid București (caretaker) | 16 April 2024 | 19 May 2024 | 6 | 1 | 1 | 4 | 10 | 13 | −3 | 16.67 |
| Total | | | 33 | 17 | 3 | 13 | 57 | 53 | +4 | 51.52 |

== Honours ==
=== Player ===
Rapid București

- Divizia A: 1998–99
- Cupa României: 1997–98
- Supercupa României: 1999

Ajax

- Eredivisie: 2003–04
- Johan Cruyff Shield: 2002, 2005, 2006

Dinamo București

- Liga I: 2001–02, 2006–07
- Cupa României runner-up: 2001–02
- Supercupa României runner-up: 2007

Roma

- Coppa Italia runner-up: 2009–10, 2012–13
- Supercoppa Italiana runner-up: 2010

Individual

- Romanian Footballer of the Year runner-up: 2007
