= 1998 Cupa României final =

- Event: 1997–98 Cupa României
Rapid București	Universitatea Craiova
Divizia A	Divizia A
1	0
- Date: 6 May 1998
- Venue: Stadionul Naţional, Bucharest
- Referee: Marcel Lică (Romania)
- Attendance: 65,000

The 1998 Cupa României final was the 60th final of Romania's most prestigious cup competition. The final was played at the Stadionul Naţional in Bucharest on 6 May 1998 and was contested between Divizia A sides Rapid București and Universitatea Craiova. The cup was won by Rapid.

== Route to the final ==
FC Rapid București

Round of 32	Midia Năvodari	0–1	Rapid București
Round of 16	Rapid București	2–1	Gaz Metan Mediaş
Quarter-finals	Rapid București	1–0	Sportul Studențesc București
Semi-finals	Rapid București	2–1	Dinamo București

FC Universitatea Craiova

Round of 32	Foresta Fălticeni	2–2 a.e.t. (3–4) pen.	Universitatea Craiova
Round of 16	Universitatea Craiova	5–2	Farul Constanţa
Quarter-finals	Universitatea Craiova	2–1 a.e.t.	FCM Bacău
Semi-finals	Argeş Piteşti	0–1	Universitatea Craiova

== Match details ==
6 May 1998
21:00 EEST

Rapid București	1–0	Universitatea Craiova
Marinescu 68' (pen.)	Report

Stadionul Naţional, Bucharest
Attendance: 65,000
Referee: Marcel Lică (Romania)

Rapid București	Universitatea Craiova

RAPID BUCUREŞTI:
GK	1	(Romania) Bogdan Lobonţ
DF	2	(Romania) Nicolae Stanciu	(yellow card) 78'
DF	3	(Romania) Cristian Dulca (c)
DF	4	(Romania) Ştefan Nanu	(yellow card) 49'	(yellow card) 73' (red card)
DF	5	(Romania) Mugur Bolohan
DF	6	(Romania) Mircea Rednic
MF	7	(Romania) Lucian Marinescu	(yellow card) 2'
MF	8	(Romania) Mario Bugeanu	(yellow card) 27'	(substituted off) 76'
FW	9	(Romania) Marius Şumudică		(substituted off) 64'
MF	10	(Romania) Daniel Iftodi
FW	11	(Romania) Daniel Pancu		(substituted off) 64'
Substitutes:
MF	17	(Romania) Zeno Bundea		(substituted on) 76'
MF	15	(Romania) Ovidiu Maier		(substituted on) 64'
––	14	(Romania) Cătălin Popa	(yellow card) 90'	(substituted on) 64'
Manager:
(Romania) Mircea Lucescu

UNIVERSITATEA CRAIOVA:
GK	1	(Romania) Tiberiu Lung
DF	2	(Romania) Nicu Năstăsie	(yellow card) 4'	(yellow card) 69' (red card)
DF	3	(Romania) Marius Iordache
MF	4	(Romania) Robert Vancea	(yellow card) 73'
MF	5	(Romania) Eugen Trică
DF	6	(Romania) Emil Săndoi (c)
DF	7	(Romania) Tiberiu Curt
MF	8	(Romania) Cornel Frăsineanu		(substituted off) 71'
FW	9	(Romania) Ionel Ganea
FW	10	(Romania) Ionuţ Luţu		(substituted off) 71'
MF	11	(Romania) Silvian Cristescu		(substituted off) 62'
Substitutes:
MF	17	(Romania) Valentin Suciu	(red card) 73'	(substituted on) 62'
MF	15	(Romania) Romulus Buia		(substituted on) 71'
FW	14	(Romania) Claudiu Niculescu		(substituted on) 71'
Manager:
(Spain) José Ramón Alexanko

MATCH OFFICIALS

- Assistant referees:
  - (Romania) Patriţiu Abrudan
  - (Romania) Nicolae Grigorescu
- Fourth official:

MAN OF THE MATCH

MATCH RULES

- 90 minutes.
- 30 minutes extra-time (15-minute intervals)
- Penalty shoot-out if scores level after extra time.
- Seven named substitutes
- Maximum of 3 substitutions.

== Broadcasting ==
The match was televised live in the United Kingdom on Channel 4, in anticipation of Romania's match against England in the World Cup that summer.
