= Dumitru Târțău =

Romanian footballer

Personal information
- Date of birth: 24 November 1970 (age 55)
- Place of birth: Bucharest, Romania
- Height: 1.81 m (5 ft 11 in)
- Position: Striker

Youth career
- Metalul București
- Dinamo București

Senior career*
Years	Team	Apps	(Gls)
1990–1995	UTA Arad (Note: The statistics for the 1990–91, 1991–92 and 1992–93 Divizia B seasons are unavailable.)	58	(13)
1995–1998	Rapid București	82	(32)
1998–1999	Gloria Bistrița	15	(5)
1999	Rapid București	5	(0)
2000	Juventus București	11	(5)
Total		171	(55)

International career
1996	Romania	1	(0)
- * Club domestic league appearances and goals

Dumitru Târțău (born 24 November 1970) is a Romanian former footballer who played as a striker.

== Club career ==
Târțău, nicknamed "More" in his youth for having a hairstyle like Dumitru Moraru, was born on 24 November 1970 in Bucharest, Romania. He began playing junior-level football at local club Metalul before moving to Dinamo. Târțău started playing at senior level for UTA Arad during the 1990–91 Divizia B season. In the 1992–93 season, he helped the team gain promotion to the first league. Subsequently, Târțău made his Divizia A debut on 15 August 1993 under coach Nicolae Dumitrescu in a 2–1 loss to Petrolul Ploiești. He netted nine goals in the 1994–95 season, but could not help UTA avoid relegation. In 1995, Târțău moved to Rapid București. He played four matches, as the team got past the Lokomotiv Sofia in the second qualifying round of the 1996–97 UEFA Cup, before suffering defeat to Karlsruhe in the first round. Domestically, during the same season, he scored a career-best 14 goals. Subsequently, he played four matches in the 1997 Intertoto Cup. In the 1997–98 season, Târțău scored six league goals to help Rapid earn a runner-up position. The team also reached the 1998 Cupa României final, where coach Mircea Lucescu did not use him in the 1–0 victory against Universitatea Craiova. In 1998, he went to play for Gloria Bistrița. One year later, Târțău returned to Rapid and helped the team win the 1999 Supercupa României, as coach Lucescu sent him in the 72nd minute to replace Sergiu Radu in the 5–0 win over rivals Steaua București. He accumulated a total of 160 matches and 50 goals in Divizia A. Târțău ended his career after playing for Juventus București during the 1999–2000 Divizia B season. He was forced to retire at age 30 due to his back problems.

== International career ==
Târțău played one friendly game for Romania on 14 August 1996, when coach Anghel Iordănescu sent him to replace Adrian Ilie in the 76th minute of a 2–0 victory against Israel.

== Honours ==
UTA Arad

- Divizia B: 1992–93

Rapid București

- Divizia A runner-up: 1997–98
- Cupa României: 1997–98
- Supercupa României: 1999
