= Nicolae Stanciu (footballer, born 1973) =

Romanian footballer

Personal information
- Date of birth: 13 November 1973 (age 52)
- Place of birth: Bucharest, Romania
- Height: 1.79 m (5 ft 10 in)
- Position: Defender

Senior career*
Years	Team	Apps	(Gls)
1990–2002	Rapid București	323	(13)
2002–2003	Anzhi Makhachkala	9	(0)
2003–2004	FC Oradea	22	(0)
Total		354	(13)

International career
1990–1991	Romania U18	4	(0)
1992–1995	Romania U21	22	(0)
1996–2000	Romania B	2	(0)
- * Club domestic league appearances and goals

Nicolae "Nae" Stanciu (born 13 November 1973) is a Romanian former professional footballer who played as a defender.

He spent most of his career with Rapid București, which he captained, and had two brief spells with Anzhi Makhachkala and FC Oradea before retiring in 2004.

== Club career ==
Stanciu was born on 13 November 1973 in Bucharest, Romania, growing up in the Giulești neighborhood. He began playing junior-level football at local club Rapid at age 10. He made his Divizia A debut on 16 September 1990 under coach Ion Pop in Rapid's 1–0 home loss to Inter Sibiu. His first performance with The White-Burgundies was winning the 1997–98 Cupa României, being used by coach Mircea Lucescu the entire match in the 1–0 win over Universitatea Craiova in the final. In the following season he helped the club win the league title, appearing in 28 games in which he scored one goal. Stanciu then won the 1999 Supercupa României, Lucescu using him the full 90 minutes in the 5–0 victory against rivals Steaua București. Stanciu's last trophy won with The Railwaymen was the 2001–02 Cupa României, playing the entire match under coach Mircea Rednic in the 2–1 win over Dinamo București in the final. During his years spent with Rapid, he also made 29 appearances with one goal in European competitions (including four matches in the Intertoto Cup).

In 2002, Stanciu joined Anzhi Makhachkala, making his debut in the Russian Premier League on 25 August under coach Gadzhi Gadzhiyev in a 3–1 away loss to CSKA Moscow, totaling nine appearances in the competition until the end of the season. Afterwards he returned to Romania, signing with FC Oradea, making his last Divizia A appearance on 12 May 2004 in a 1–1 draw against Oțelul Galați, totaling 345 matches with 13 goals in the competition.

== International career ==
From 1990 to 2000, Stanciu was consistently featured for Romania's under-18, under-21 and B sides. However, he never played for Romania's senior team and on 13 May 2020, Gazeta Sporturilor included him in a first XI of best Romanian players who never played for the senior national team.

== Executive career ==
In September 2014, Stanciu was appointed president at Rapid București, a position he held until December.

== Honours ==
Rapid București

- Divizia A: 1998–99
- Cupa României: 1997–98, 2001–02
- Supercupa României: 1999
