= 1996–97 Divizia B =

Divizia B
- Season: 1996–97
- Country: Romania
- Teams: 36 (2x18)
- Promoted: Foresta Fălticeni; CSM Reșița
- Relegated: Cetatea Târgu Neamț; Minaur Zlatna; Steaua Mizil; CFR Timișoara
- Top goalscorer: Claudiu Niculescu (24 goals)

The 1996–97 Divizia B was the 57th season of the second tier of the Romanian football league system.

The format has been maintained to two series, each of them having 18 teams. At the end of the season, the winners of the series promoted to Divizia A and the last two places from both series relegated to Divizia C.

== Team changes ==
=== To Divizia B ===
Promoted from Divizia C

- Petrolul Moinești
- Danubiana București
- Precizia Săcele
- CFR Cluj

Relegated from Divizia A

- Inter Sibiu
- Politehnica Iași

=== From Divizia B ===
Relegated to Divizia C

- FC Caracal
- Bihor Oradea
- Portul Constanța
- FC Râmnicu Vâlcea

Promoted to Divizia A

- Oțelul Târgoviște
- Jiul Petroșani

=== Renamed teams ===
Danubiana București merged with Astra Ploiești and was renamed as Danubiana Ploiești.

Unirea Alba Iulia was renamed as Apulum Alba Iulia

== League tables ==
=== Seria I ===
Pos	Team	Pld	W	D	L	GF	GA	GD	Pts	Qualification
1	Foresta Fălticeni (C, P)	34	24	4	6	79	22	+57	76	Promotion to Divizia A
2	Precizia Săcele	34	19	4	11	62	43	+19	61	
3	Dacia Unirea Brăila	34	18	6	10	60	35	+25	60	
4	FC Onești	34	18	5	11	68	36	+32	59	
5	Petrolul Moinești	34	17	6	11	56	42	+14	57	
6	Gloria Buzău	34	17	4	13	69	37	+32	55	
7	Politehnica Iași	34	17	4	13	53	39	+14	55	
8	Danubiana Ploiești	34	14	9	11	42	31	+11	51	
9	Dunărea Călărași	34	14	8	12	50	46	+4	50	
10	Poiana Câmpina	34	15	5	14	42	37	+5	50	
11	Tractorul Brașov	34	14	7	13	42	32	+10	49	
12	Bucovina Suceava	34	14	6	14	43	39	+4	48	
13	Rocar București	34	14	5	15	53	42	+11	47	
14	Dunărea Galați	34	12	7	15	44	47	−3	43	
15	Metrom Brașov	34	11	9	14	36	34	+2	42	
16	Metalul Plopeni	34	10	7	17	34	50	−16	37	
17	Cetatea Târgu Neamț (R)	34	4	5	25	22	122	−100	17	Relegation to Divizia C
18	Steaua Mizil (R)	34	1	5	28	11	132	−121	8	Relegation to Divizia C

Updated to match(es) played on 30 June 1997. Source: romaniansoccer.ro (in Romanian)
Rules for classification: 1) Points; 2) Head-to-head points; 3) Head-to-head goal difference; 4) Head-to-head goals scored; 5) Head-to-head away goals scored; 6) Goal difference; 7) Goals scored.
(C) Champions; (P) Promoted; (R) Relegated

=== Seria II ===
Pos	Team	Pld	W	D	L	GF	GA	GD	Pts	Qualification
1	CSM Reșița (C, P)	34	22	4	8	57	32	+25	70	Promotion to Divizia A
2	Electroputere Craiova	34	21	7	6	57	21	+36	70	
3	Gaz Metan Mediaș	34	16	8	10	40	22	+18	56	
4	Minerul Motru	34	16	5	13	41	41	0	53	
5	Dacia Pitești	34	15	6	13	50	45	+5	51	
6	Unirea Dej	34	14	7	13	49	44	+5	49	
7	Corvinul Hunedoara	34	14	6	14	51	42	+9	48	
8	ASA Târgu Mureș	34	14	6	14	41	40	+1	48	
9	CFR Cluj	34	14	5	15	43	45	−2	47	
10	Gloria Reșița	34	13	8	13	35	44	−9	47	
11	Olimpia Satu Mare	34	15	1	18	50	44	+6	46	
12	ARO Câmpulung	34	14	3	17	32	37	−5	45	
13	UTA Arad	34	14	2	18	38	55	−17	44	
14	Maramureș Baia Mare	34	12	7	15	44	49	−5	43	
15	Inter Sibiu	34	11	8	15	33	39	−6	41	
16	Apulum Alba Iulia	34	13	1	20	42	62	−20	40	
17	Minaur Zlatna (R)	34	10	7	17	35	51	−16	37	Relegation to Divizia C
18	CFR Timișoara (R)	34	9	7	18	31	56	−25	34	Relegation to Divizia C

Updated to match(es) played on 30 June 1997. Source: romaniansoccer.ro (in Romanian)
Rules for classification: 1) Points; 2) Head-to-head points; 3) Head-to-head goal difference; 4) Head-to-head goals scored; 5) Head-to-head away goals scored; 6) Goal difference; 7) Goals scored.
(C) Champions; (P) Promoted; (R) Relegated

== Top scorers ==
24 goals

- (Romania) Claudiu Niculescu (Electroputere Craiova)

15 goals

- (Romania) Daniel Bona (Precizia Săcele)

13 goals

- (Romania) Lucian Marinescu (CSM Reșița)

10 goals

- (Romania) Pompiliu Stoica (Gloria Buzău)

9 goals

- (Romania) Mihai Dăscălescu (Corvinul Hunedoara)

8 goals

- (Romania) Giani Gorga (FC Onești)
- (Romania) Ovidiu Maier (Inter Sibiu)

7 goals

- (Romania) Sorin Oncică (CFR Cluj)
- (Romania) Robert Ilyes (Foresta Fălticeni)

6 goals

- (Romania) Iulian Dăniță (Dunărea Galați)
- (Romania) Virgil Marșavela (Metrom Brașov)
- (Romania) Costel Lazăr (Astra Ploiești)
- (Romania) Nicolae Constantin (Astra Ploiești)
- (Romania) Ionuț Savu (Rocar București)

== See also ==
- 1996–97 Divizia A
