= Ion Voicu (footballer) =

Romanian footballer

Personal information
- Date of birth: 1 November 1975 (age 50)
- Place of birth: Drăgășani, Romania
- Height: 1.69 m (5 ft 7 in)
- Position: Right back

Senior career*
Years	Team	Apps	(Gls)
1993–1994	Dinamo București	3	(1)
1994–1995	Gloria Buzău	23	(0)
1995–1996	Gloria Iris Cornești		
1996–1997	Farul Constanța	4	(0)
1998	Rocar București	4	(0)
1998–2000	Rapid București	20	(0)
2000	Dinamo București	1	(0)
2001	Rocar București	18	(0)
2001–2003	Rapid București	34	(1)
2003–2004	Fehérvár	15	(1)
2004	Apulum Alba Iulia	7	(0)
2005	Fehérvár	5	(1)
2005–2006	Jiul Petroșani	15	(0)
2006–2007	FC Vaslui	7	(0)
2007–2008	Dunărea Galați	13	(0)
Total		166	(3)

International career
1984	Romania U21	2	(0)
1987	Romania Olympic	1	(0)
- * Club domestic league appearances and goals

Ion Voicu (born 1 November 1975) is a Romanian former footballer who played as a right defender.

== Honours ==
Rapid București

- Divizia A: 1998–99, 2002–03
- Cupa României: 2001–02
- Supercupa României: 1999, 2002

Rocar București

- Cupa României runner-up: 2000–01
