= Bolohan (surname) =

Bolohan is a Romanian/Moldovan surname. Notable people with the surname include:

- Mugur Bolohan (born 1976), Romanian football player
- Vadim Bolohan (born 1986), Moldovan football player
