= Marius Iordache =

Romanian footballer

Personal information
- Full name: Marius Sandu Iordache
- Date of birth: 8 October 1978 (age 48)
- Place of birth: Craiova, Romania
- Height: 1.74 m (5 ft 9 in)
- Position: Left back

Senior career*
Years	Team	Apps	(Gls)
1996–1999	FCU Craiova	54	(2)
1999	Villarreal	1	(0)
1999–2000	Steaua București	9	(1)
2000–2003	Național București	39	(1)
2003–2005	FC Universitatea Craiova	23	(0)
2005–2006	Pandurii Târgu Jiu	5	(0)
2006–2007	Ethnikos Achnas	28	(1)
2007–2008	Ceahlăul Piatra Neamț	8	(0)
Total		167	(5)

International career
1996	Romania U18	7	(0)
1998–1999	Romania U21	10	(0)
1998	Romania B	1	(0)
- * Club domestic league appearances and goals as of 23 January 2008

Marius Sandu Iordache (born 8 October 1978 in Craiova, Dolj County, Romania) is a retired Romanian football player. He played as a left back.

== Club career ==
Iordache, nicknamed Jordy, was born on 8 October 1978 in Craiova, Romania. He began playing football at FC Universitatea Craiova, making his Divizia A debut on 2 October 1996 under coach Emerich Jenei in a 4–0 away victory against Politehnica Timișoara. The club reached the 1998 Cupa României final where coach José Ramón Alexanko used him the entire match in the 1–0 loss to Rapid București. In 1999, Iordache was transferred to Villarreal where he was teammates with fellow Romanian Gheorghe Craioveanu. There, he played in both legs of the 4–0 aggregate loss to Real Madrid in the round of 16 of the 1998–99 Copa del Rey. Subsequently, he made his only La Liga appearance on 28 February 1999 under coach José Antonio Irulegui in a 2–2 draw against Espanyol Barcelona. Afterwards, Iordache joined Steaua București, where he played in the 1999 Supercupa României as a starter under coach Jenei before being replaced by Laurențiu Reghecampf in the 62nd minute as they lost 5–0 to Rapid. He also played in both legs of the 7–1 aggregate victory against Levadia Tallinn in the 1999–2000 UEFA Cup qualifying round. In the middle of the season, he left Steaua to join Național București. He helped The Bankers earn a runner-up position in the 2001–02 season. Iordache also played for them in a 1–0 loss to Tirana in the 2002–03 UEFA Cup qualifying round. In 2003, he made a comeback to FCU Craiova where at the end of the 2004–05 season, the team was relegated to Divizia B. However, Iordache continued to play in Divizia A, as he signed with Pandurii Târgu Jiu. Subsequently, he joined Ethnikos Achnas where he won the 2006 Intertoto Cup, playing five games in the campaign as they eliminated Partizani, Osijek and Maccabi Petah Tikva. Afterwards, they qualified to the 2006–07 UEFA Cup where Ethnikos defeated Roeselare in the second qualifying round, being eliminated by Lens in the first round, with Iordache playing in all four games. Iordache went back to Romania in 2007, signing with Ceahlăul Piatra Neamț. He made his last Divizia A appearance on 25 November 2007 in Ceahlăul's 3–2 away loss to Politehnica Timișoara, totaling 139 matches with four goals in the competition.

== International career ==
Between 1994 and 1999, Iordache made several appearances for Romania's under-18, under-21 and B teams. During his time with the under-21 side, he was part of the team that managed a first-ever qualification to a European Championship in 1998, which Romania subsequently hosted. In the final tournament that was composed of eight teams, coach Victor Pițurcă used him in two games which were losses to Germany and Russia, as they finished in last place.

== Honours ==
Universitatea Craiova

- Cupa României runner-up: 1997–98

Steaua București

- Supercupa României runner-up: 1999

Național București

- Divizia A runner-up: 2001–02

Ethnikos Achnas

- Intertoto Cup: 2006
