= Alin Minteuan =

Romanian footballer (born 1976)

Personal information
- Full name: Alin Ilie Minteuan
- Date of birth: 12 November 1976 (age 49)
- Place of birth: Cluj-Napoca, Romania
- Height: 1.80 m (5 ft 11 in)
- Position: Midfielder

Team information
- Current team: CSU Alba Iulia (manager)

Youth career
- 1988–1993: CFR Cluj

Senior career*
Years	Team	Apps	(Gls)
1993–1997	CFR Cluj (Note: The statistics for the 1993–94 Divizia B and 1995–96 Divizia C seasons are unavailable.)	55	(8)
1997–1998	Universitatea Cluj	31	(4)
1998	Rapid București	4	(0)
1998–2000	Gloria Bistrița	44	(7)
2000–2002	Hapoel Haifa	53	(4)
2002–2004	Gloria Bistrița	57	(9)
2004–2005	Hapoel Be'er Sheva	24	(2)
2005–2008	CFR Cluj	69	(3)
Total		337	(37)

Managerial career
- 2009–2010: CFR Cluj (assistant)
- 2010–2011: CFR Cluj
- 2011–2012: CFR Cluj U19
- 2012–2013: Unirea Dej
- 2013–2018: CFR Cluj (assistant)
- 2018–2019: CFR II Cluj
- 2019: CFR Cluj (caretaker)
- 2019–2020: CFR Cluj (assistant)
- 2020–2021: CSM Reșița
- 2021–2022: CFR II Cluj
- 2022–2023: CFR Cluj (assistant)
- 2024–: CSU Alba Iulia
- * Club domestic league appearances and goals

Alin Ilie Minteuan (born 12 November 1976) is a Romanian football coach and former player.

== Playing career ==
Minteuan's first team was CFR Cluj, where he went on to play for Universitatea Cluj, Rapid Bucharest, and Gloria Bistrita, also having two spells in the Israel Premier League at Hapoel Haifa and Hapoel Be'er Sheva. In 2005 he played five games, scoring one goal for CFR Cluj in the 2005 Intertoto Cup campaign in which the club reached the final. He played as a central defensive midfielder.

== Coaching career ==
Minteuan worked for a while as an assistant coach at CFR Cluj, working with coaches Dušan Uhrin Jr., Vasile Miriuță, Sorin Cârțu, Toni Conceição, Jorge Costa, Andrea Mandorlini and Dan Petrescu, also having some spells as head coach of the team.

== Honours ==
CFR Cluj

- Liga I: 2007–08
- Cupa României: 2007–08
- Divizia C: 1995–96
- UEFA Intertoto Cup runner-up: 2005

Rapid București

- Liga I: 1998–99

Hapoel Haifa

- Toto Cup: 2000–01
