= Mircea Rednic =

Romanian footballer and manager

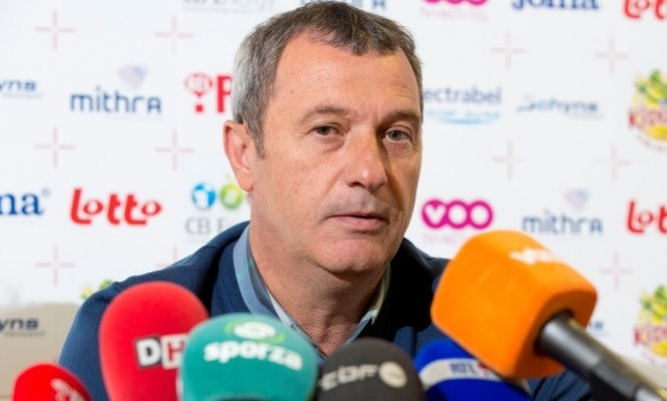
- Rednic at a press conference in 2013

Personal information
- Date of birth: 9 April 1962 (age 64)
- Place of birth: Hunedoara, Romania
- Height: 1.75 m (5 ft 9 in)
- Position: Defender

Youth career
- 1976–1979: Corvinul Hunedoara
- 1979–1980: Luceafărul București (ro)

Senior career*
Years	Team	Apps	(Gls)
1980–1983	Corvinul Hunedoara	96	(6)
1983–1990	Dinamo București	212	(21)
1990–1991	Bursaspor	14	(0)
1991–1996	Standard Liège	140	(3)
1996–1997	Sint-Truidense	10	(0)
1997–2000	Rapid București	89	(2)
Total		561	(32)

International career
1981	Romania U20	6	(0)
1981–1991	Romania	83	(2)

Managerial career
- 1998: Rapid București (caretaker)
- 2000–2001: Rapid București
- 2001: FCM Bacău
- 2002–2003: Rapid București
- 2004: Al-Nassr
- 2004–2005: Universitatea Craiova
- 2005: Vaslui
- 2005–2006: Vaslui
- 2006–2007: Dinamo București
- 2007–2008: Rapid București
- 2008–2009: Dinamo București
- 2009: Alania Vladikavkaz
- 2010–2011: Khazar Lankaran
- 2012: Astra Ploiești
- 2012: Petrolul Ploiești
- 2012–2013: Standard Liège
- 2013: CFR Cluj
- 2013–2014: Gent
- 2015: Petrolul Ploiești
- 2015–2016: Dinamo București
- 2016–2018: Excel Mouscron
- 2018: Al-Faisaly
- 2018–2019: Dinamo București
- 2020: Politehnica Iași
- 2020–2021: Viitorul Constanța
- 2021: Dinamo București
- 2023–2025: UTA Arad
- 2025: Standard Liège
Medal record
Representing Romania
FIFA U-20 World Cup
Bronze medal – third place	1981 Australia
- * Club domestic league appearances and goals

Mircea Rednic (born 9 April 1962) is a Romanian professional football manager and former player who played as a defender.

== Club career ==
=== Corvinul Hunedoara ===
Rednic, nicknamed "Puriul", was born on 9 April 1962 in Hunedoara and until he was 14 years old he played table tennis, handball, volleyball and chess before starting to play football at Corvinul Hunedoara's youth center under coach Remus Vlad. Coach Mircea Lucescu gave him his debut for Corvinul's senior squad in the 1979–80 Divizia B season. Subsequently, as the team got promoted, Lucescu gave him his Divizia A debut on 2 August 1980 in a 4–1 victory against ASA Târgu Mureș. In the following seasons Rednic helped the club finish third in the 1981–82 Divizia A and appeared in four games in the 1982–83 UEFA Cup as they got past Grazer AK in the first round, being eliminated in the following one by FK Sarajevo.

=== Dinamo București ===
In the summer of 1983, Rednic and teammate Ioan Andone were transferred from Corvinul to Dinamo București in exchange for five players, including Nicușor Vlad, Teofil Stredie and Florea Văetuș. In his first season spent with The Red Dogs, he helped the club win The Double, coach Nicolae Dumitru using him in 31 league games and he played the entire match in the 2–1 victory over rivals Steaua București in the Cupa României final. Rednic also appeared in eight matches in the 1983–84 European Cup, helping the club get past title holders Hamburg and then Dinamo Minsk against whom he scored a goal, reaching the semi-finals where they were defeated by Liverpool. For the way he played in 1983, Rednic was placed fifth in the ranking for the Romanian Footballer of the Year award, and in the following year, he was fourth. He would reunite at Dinamo with his former coach from Corvinul, Mircea Lucescu. Their first achievement was the winning of the 1985–86 Cupa României where in the final he played the entire match, which ended with a 1–0 win against Steaua who had recently won the European Cup.

Rednic took part in a big scandal in the derby against Steaua in March 1989, which was lost with 2–1 after Gheorghe Hagi opened the score, Andone equalized for Dinamo and Gabi Balint scored the winning goal for Steaua in the last minute of the game. Furthermore, referee Ion Crăciunescu eliminated Rodion Cămătaru and Claudiu Vaișcovici from Dinamo. Feeling disadvantaged by the referee, right after the game, Rednic and Andone showed some obscene gestures in front of the official tribune where Valentin Ceaușescu, the son of dictator Nicolae Ceaușescu and unofficial president of Steaua was staying. Rednic got away with it after a friend of his from Steaua, László Bölöni, talked to Valentin Ceaușescu. Andone was initially suspended for a year by the Romanian Football Federation, but after his friend from Steaua, Marius Lăcătuș, talked to Valentin Ceaușescu and convinced him to forgive Andone, his suspension was reduced to three months.

His following performance was playing six games in the 1988–89 European Cup Winners' Cup, reaching the quarter-finals where they were eliminated on the away goals rule after 1–1 on aggregate by Sampdoria. In the following season he won another Double with the club, Lucescu giving him 19 appearances in which he scored one goal in the league, and also played the full 90 minutes in the 6–4 win over Steaua in the Cupa României final. In the same season, he made another European appearance by playing eight games in the 1989–90 European Cup Winners' Cup and scoring once against Panathinaikos, before the team was eliminated in the semi-finals following a 2–0 aggregate loss to Anderlecht.

=== Bursaspor, Standard Liège and Sint-Truidense ===
In December 1990, Rednic went to play in Turkey for Bursaspor, where he became a teammate of compatriot Gheorghe Nițu and a young Hakan Şükür. He made his debut in the Turkish league on 26 January 1991 under coach Đorđe Milić in a 2–1 away victory against Sarıyer.

In 1991, coach Mircea Lucescu told him to go to Standard Liège because it was the team he would be coaching in the near future. However, Lucescu never had the opportunity to train there, but Rednic spent five seasons with the club. His Belgian First Division debut took place on 16 August 1991 under coach Arie Haan in a 2–1 home loss to Club Brugge. He won the 1992–93 Belgian Cup with The Reds, as coach Haan used him the entire match in the 2–0 win over Charleroi in the final. During these years, Rednic played regularly for Standard and was teammates for short periods with compatriots Bogdan Stelea and Gheorghe Butoiu.

In 1996, after his period at Standard Liège ended, he moved to Sint-Truidense. There, on 2 February 1997 he made his last Belgian First Division appearance in a 3–1 away loss to Germinal Beerschot, totaling 150 matches with three goals in the competition.

=== Rapid București ===
In 1997, Rednic returned to Romania at Rapid București, at the advice of the team's coach, Mircea Lucescu. He spent the last three years of his career there, playing the entire match in the 1–0 win over Universitatea Craiova in the 1998 Cupa României final. Subsequently, he played in 32 matches in which he scored one goal in the 1998–99 season as the team won its first title after 32 years. On 10 May 2000, Rednic made his last Divizia A appearance in Rapid's 3–1 home win over "U" Craiova, totaling 391 appearances with 29 goals in the competition and 47 matches with two goals in European competitions.

== International career ==
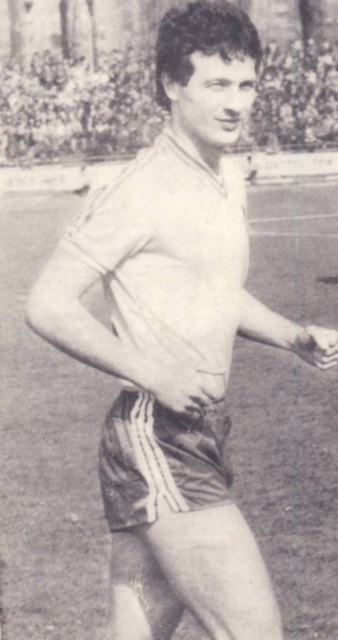
Rednic with the under-21 national team c. 1980

Rednic was selected by coach Constantin Cernăianu to be part of Romania's under-20 squad for the 1981 World Youth Championship held in Australia. He appeared in six games, helping the team finish the tournament in third position, winning the bronze medal.

Rednic played 83 matches and scored two goals for Romania, making his debut under coach Mircea Lucescu in a 0–0 draw against Switzerland in the 1982 World Cup qualifiers. He made eight appearances during the successful Euro 1984 qualifiers, including a 1–0 victory against World Cup holders Italy. Subsequently, coach Lucescu used him for the entirety of all three games in the final tournament which were a draw against Spain and losses to West Germany and Portugal, as his side failed to progress from their group.

Rednic played eight games in the 1986 World Cup qualifiers and four during the Euro 1988 qualifiers. Afterwards he made three appearances in the successful 1990 World Cup qualifiers. He was used by coach Emerich Jenei for the entirety of all four matches in the final tournament, as Romania got eliminated by Ireland in the round of 16. He played one game during the Euro 1992 qualifiers and made his last appearance for the national team on 23 May 1991 in a 1–0 friendly loss to Norway.

For representing his country at the 1990 World Cup, Rednic was decorated by President of Romania Traian Băsescu on 25 March 2008 with the Ordinul "Meritul Sportiv" – (The Medal "The Sportive Merit") class III.

== Managerial career ==
Rednic's first coaching experience came in December 1998 at Rapid București, while he was still an active player. He was appointed caretaker manager for one Divizia A game after Mircea Lucescu left to train Inter Milan, securing a 3–0 victory against Universitatea Cluj. Rednic started working as a full-time coach in 2000 when he was appointed at Rapid to replace Anghel Iordănescu. He then moved to fellow Divizia A team FCM Bacău where he stayed only a few months, returning in 2002 to Rapid.

Rednic's second spell at Rapid was one in which he won the first trophies of his coaching career. The first one was the 2001–02 Cupa României, following a 2–1 victory against Dinamo București in the final. Then he won the 2002 Supercupa României, after another 2–1 win over Dinamo. For the 2002–03 season, Rednic had Florin Bratu and Daniel Niculae form an offensive partnership, a move that proved to be successful as Rapid won the title. Subsequently, he led the team to win the 2003 Supercupa României by defeating once again Dinamo with a score of 1–0. He was close to helping Rapid get past Anderlecht in the 2003–04 Champions League second qualifying round after earning a 0–0 away draw in the first leg, but lost the second leg 2–3 despite leading 2–0 at halftime. Rapid dismissed him in the middle of the 2003–04 season while the club was still in the top positions, fighting to win the championship.

Afterwards, Rednic had his first coaching experience outside Romania when he signed with Saudi Arabian side Al-Nassr where he spent a few months, bringing Adrian Neaga with him. He then returned in Romania as Universitatea Craiova's manager in the 2004–05 Divizia A season. After a 3–1 victory against Rapid, at the press conference following the game, he sang the chorus of a song made by the Romanian band Ca$$a Locco:"I'm so glad that you took the sting, I'm so glad that you lost!". That was a message to the leaders of Rapid who fired him. However, he resigned after a 1–1 draw against FCM Bacău in the 8th round of the championship. In 2005, Rednic went to coach FC Vaslui in Divizia B, which he helped gain promotion to the first league, but refused to extend his contract at the end of the season. After the first six rounds of the 2005–06 Divizia A season, he came back to the team, helping it avoid relegation.

In 2006, Rednic had his first spell at Dinamo București, managing to win the 2006–07 Liga I title. For this achievement, he deployed a central defensive partnership of Cosmin Moți and Ștefan Radu, while rotating the prolific strikers Ionel Dănciulescu, Claudiu Niculescu, and Ionel Ganea, as only two could start in any given match. In the first 13 rounds of that season, the team had 13 consecutive victories and won all four derbies against Steaua and Rapid, including the 4–2 victory against Steaua at the Ghencea stadium which was the first away victory for The Red Dogs in the derby after 18 years. Rednic also managed to get past the group stage of the 2006–07 UEFA Cup, reaching the round of 32 where the team was eliminated with 3–1 on aggregate by Benfica. He resigned from Dinamo after a bad start in the 2007–08 season, as the club did not manage to reach the Champions League group stage after a 4–2 aggregate loss to Lazio Roma in the third qualifying round. In October 2007, Rednic returned for a third spell at Rapid which lasted until March 2008 when he resigned. In April 2008, Rednic started his second spell at Dinamo, leading the team to the top of the table for most of the 2008–09 season, only to finish in third place following three consecutive losses that ultimately prompted his departure from the club.

In August 2009, Rednic went to coach abroad, first at Russian second league side Alania Vladikavkaz with whom he finished the championship in third place, thus failing to gain promotion to the Russian Premier League. From July 2010 until December 2011, he managed Khazar Lankaran in Azerbaijan where he recruited numerous Romanians, bringing nine of them to the club. He managed to win the Azerbaijan Cup following a penalty shoot-out win over Inter Baku in the final, and finished the 2010–11 Azerbaijan Premier League season in second position. He was dismissed after a 1–0 loss to Inter Baku in the 15th round of the 2011–12 regular season. In March 2012, Rednic returned to Romania and signed a contract with Astra Ploiești until the end of the season. Afterwards, he decided not to continue with Astra, moving instead to their biggest rivals Petrolul Ploiești. In October 2012, Rednic left Petrolul to coach Standard Liège, bringing Romanian players Adrian Cristea and George Țucudean with him. He made his debut as The Reds coach in an away league game which ended with a 2–0 victory against Genk that was the only team unbeaten in the previous 12 rounds of the season. During that game, he wore a tie gifted to him by the club in 1996, when he was a player who had spent five years at Standard. Despite an emphatic 7–1 aggregate win over Gent in the Europa League qualification play-off, Rednic's contract was not extended at the end of the season. He explicitly attributed his sacking to a conflict between him and club's chairman Roland Duchâtelet who wanted a "marionette" instead of a coach.

On 10 June 2013, Rednic returned to Romania as the new head coach of CFR Cluj. However, he ended his contract by mutual agreement just two months later, having won only one of the first four championship games and had a conflict with team captain Ricardo Cadú. On 1 October 2013, it was announced that Rednic had moved to Gent to replace Víctor Fernández. He was dismissed in April 2014, a few rounds before the season's end, with club officials citing a poor relationship between the coach and players. Afterwards he had a short second spell at Petrolul Ploiești and a third spell at Dinamo with whom he reached the Cupa României final which was lost to CFR Cluj. He then went to coach a third team in Belgium, Excel Mouscron where he worked with Romanian players Cristian Manea and Dorin Rotariu. He took the club from the last place of the 2016–17 Belgian First Division A and helped it avoid relegation. However, he was dismissed the following season after managing to obtain 29 points in 26 rounds, which was considered insufficient by the club's officials. From 2018 until 2021, Rednic had coaching experiences at Saudi Arabian club Al-Faisaly, Politehnica Iași, Viitorul and two spells at Dinamo, all of them being short and unsuccessful with a low victory percentage.

In April 2023, with four rounds before the end of the 2022–23 season, UTA Arad appointed Rednic as their head coach with the objective of saving the team from relegation. He succeeded in avoiding relegation and kept the club in the first league for the following two seasons. In June 2025, he returned to Standard Liège for a second spell as head coach. However, after earning two victories, one draw and two losses in the first five rounds of the 2025–26 season, he was dismissed.

=== Managing style ===
Rednic earned a reputation as a resilient coach capable of navigating difficult circumstances, frequently making an immediate impact on his clubs through sweeping changes despite occasionally running into interpersonal conflicts. Tactically, he preferred a four-man defense alongside a two-forward attack, though he readily adapted his formation to fit the players at his disposal. He described his football philosophy by stating: "When we lose the ball, everyone defends; when we have the ball, everyone attacks—including the goalkeeper, who should play in a more advanced position. Naturally, during the game, I want as many players as possible in front of the goal. If you want to score, you need options up front." Furthermore, he historically prioritized the development of young talent at the clubs he managed. Rednic was also known for bringing foreign players to the teams he coached in Romania, mostly through his relations in Belgium. Notable players of this kind include Emmanuel Godfroid, Roberto Bisconti and Philippe Léonard at Rapid București; George Blay, Harlem Gnohéré, Ante Puljić, Miha Mevlja and Antun Palić at Dinamo București; Jeremy Bokila and Manassé Enza-Yamissi at Petrolul Ploiești; Rubenilson at Universitatea Craiova.

== Career statistics ==
=== International ===
Appearances and goals by national team and year
National team	Year	Apps	Goals
Romania	1981	1	0
Romania	1982	12	0
Romania	1983	13	0
Romania	1984	7	1
Romania	1985	10	0
Romania	1986	9	0
Romania	1987	5	0
Romania	1988	6	0
Romania	1989	7	0
Romania	1990	11	1
Romania	1991	2	0
Total		83	2

Scores and results list Romania's goal tally first, score column indicates score after each Rednic goal.

Goal	Date	Venue	Opponent	Score	Result	Competition
1	29 July 1984	Stadionul 23 August, Iași, Romania	China	1–0	4–2	Friendly
2	26 May 1990	Heysel Stadium, Brussels, Belgium	Belgium	1–2	2–2	Friendly

== Honours ==
=== Player ===
Corvinul Hunedoara

- Divizia B: 1979–80

Dinamo București

- Divizia A: 1983–84, 1989–90
- Cupa României: 1983–84, 1985–86, 1989–90

Standard Liége

- Belgian Cup: 1992–93

Rapid București

- Divizia A: 1998–99
- Cupa României: 1997–98
- Supercupa României: 1999

Romania U20

- FIFA U-20 World Cup third-place: 1981

Individual

- Romanian Footballer of the Year fourth place: 1984

=== Manager ===
Rapid București

- Divizia A: 2002–03
- Cupa României: 2001–02
- Supercupa României: 2002, 2003

Vaslui

- Divizia B: 2004–05

Dinamo București

- Liga I: 2006–07
- Cupa României runner-up: 2015–16
- Supercupa României runner-up: 2007

Khazar Lankaran

- Azerbaijan Cup: 2010–11
