= Marius Bratu =

Romanian footballer (born 1973)

Personal information
- Date of birth: 27 February 1973 (age 53)
- Place of birth: Focșani, Romania
- Height: 1.85 m (6 ft 1 in)
- Position: Goalkeeper

Youth career
- –1992: Unirea Focșani

Senior career*
| Years | Team | Apps | (Gls) |
| 1992–1993 | Unirea Focșani | | |
| 1994 | Progresul București | 0 | (0) |
| 1994 | Rapid București | 3 | (0) |
| 1995–1997 | AS Bacău | 47 | (0) |
| 1997–1999 | Rapid București | 17 | (0) |
| 2000 | Astra Ploiești | 11 | (0) |
| 2001–2002 | Uralan Elista | 3 | (0) |
| 2002–2003 | Astra Ploiești | 15 | (0) |
| 2003–2004 | Petrolul Ploiești | 0 | (0) |
| 2005 | Vaslui | 6 | (0) |
| Total | | 102 | (0) |

Managerial career
- 2005: Vaslui (GK coach)
- 2006: Dinamo București (GK coach)
- 2006–2007: Unirea Focșani (GK coach)
- 2007–2008: Rapid București (GK coach)
- 2007–2009: Dinamo București (GK coach)
- 2009–2010: Politehnica Timișoara (GK coach)
- 2011–2012: Rapid București (GK coach)
- 2012–2017: El Jaish (GK coach)
- 2019: CSM Focșani (technical director)
- 2019: CSM Focșani
- 2021–2022: CSM Focșani
- 2023–2024: CS Dinamo București
- 2024: Agricola Borcea
- 2024: AFC Câmpulung Muscel
- * Club domestic league appearances and goals

Marius Bratu (born 27 February 1973) is a Romanian professional football manager and former player.

== Honours ==
Selena Bacău

- Divizia B: 1994–95

Rapid București

- Divizia A: 1998–99
- Cupa României: 1997–98
- Supercupa României: 1999

Vaslui

- Divizia B: 2004–05
