= Sorin Oncică =

Romanian footballer

Personal information
- Full name: Sorin Ștefan Oncică
- Date of birth: 29 July 1973 (age 53)
- Place of birth: Cetate, Romania
- Height: 1.79 m (5 ft 10 in)
- Position: Attacking midfielder

Senior career*
Years	Team	Apps	(Gls)
1996–1997	CFR Cluj	32	(7)
1997	Gloria Bistrița	0	(0)
1997–1999	Universitatea Cluj	58	(2)
1999	Rapid București	0	(0)
2000–2001	Tractorul Brașov	25	(10)
2001–2002	Industria Sârmei Câmpia Turzii	22	(5)
2002–2005	CFR Cluj	83	(17)
2006	Gloria Bistrița	8	(0)
2006–2007	UTA Arad	16	(0)
Total		244	(41)

Managerial career
- 2007–2008: CFR II Cluj
- * Club domestic league appearances and goals

Sorin Ștefan Oncică (born 29 July 1973) is a Romanian former footballer who played as a midfielder.

== Playing career ==
Oncică was born on 29 July 1973 in Cetate, Romania. He began playing senior-level football in 1996 at Divizia B club CFR Cluj. Subsequently, he joined Gloria Bistrița where he played three matches in the 1997 Intertoto Cup. Shortly afterwards, he went to play for Universitatea Cluj, making his Divizia A debut on 2 August 1997 under coach Adrian Coca in a 2–1 away loss to Steaua București. The team suffered relegation at the end of the 1998–99 season. Oncică went to Rapid București, where coach Mircea Lucescu sent him in the 54th minute to replace Ovidiu Maier in the 5–0 victory against rivals Steaua in the 1999 Supercupa României. He then moved to Divizia B club Tractorul Brașov. For the 2001–02 season, he played for Industria Sârmei Câmpia Turzii, moving afterwards to CFR Cluj. Oncică helped CFR gain promotion to the first league at the end of the 2003–04 season. In the following season, he scored a brace in a 4–2 win over Dinamo București. Under coach Dorinel Munteanu, he played 10 games in the 2005 Intertoto Cup campaign as CFR got past Vėtra, Athletic Bilbao, Saint-Étienne and Žalgiris, with the team reaching the final where they were defeated 4–2 on aggregate by Lens. In the middle of the 2005–06 season, he left CFR and joined Gloria Bistrița. Half a year later, Oncică went to UTA Arad, where he made his last Divizia A appearance on 8 December 2006 in a 1–0 loss to FC Vaslui, totaling 113 matches with six goals in the competition.

== Managerial career ==
Oncică was appointed head coach in September 2007 at Liga IV team CFR II Cluj. He helped the team gain promotion to the third league at the end of the 2007–08 season.

== Honours ==
=== Player ===
Rapid București

- Supercupa României: 1999

CFR Cluj

- Divizia B: 2003–04
- UEFA Intertoto Cup runner-up: 2005

=== Manager ===
CFR II Cluj

- Liga IV: 2007–08
