= Ionel Ganea =

Romanian footballer and manager

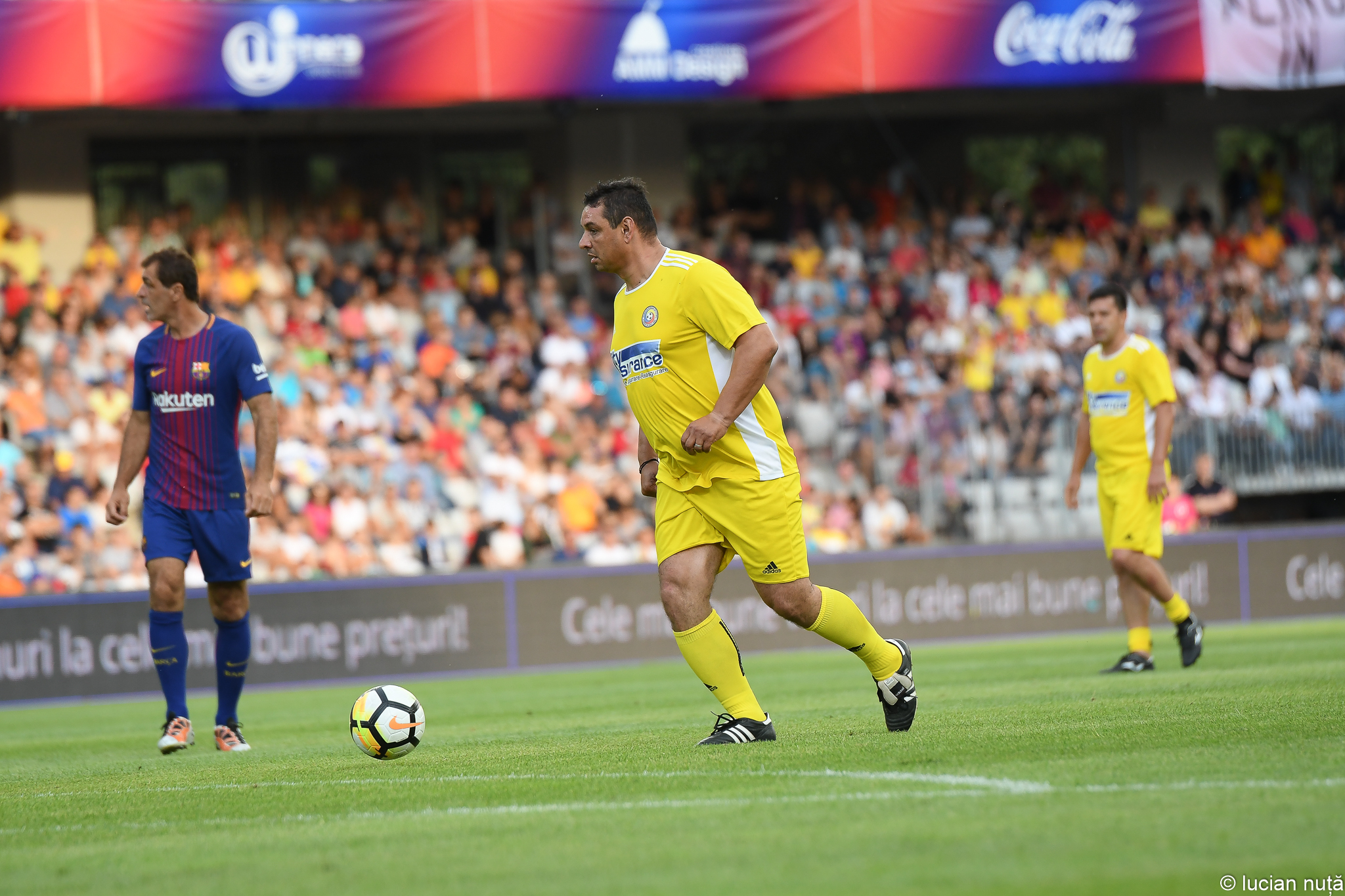
- Ganea in 2018

Personal information
- Full name: Ioan Viorel Ganea
- Date of birth: 10 August 1973 (age 53)
- Place of birth: Făgăraș, Romania
- Height: 1.79 m (5 ft 10 in)
- Position: Striker

Team information
- Current team: Chimia Orașul Victoria (head coach)

Youth career
- –1992: Nitramonia Făgăraș

Senior career*
Years	Team	Apps	(Gls)
1992–1994	ICIM Brașov		
1994–1995	FC Brașov	50	(4)
1996–1998	Universitatea Craiova	56	(22)
1998	Gloria Bistrița	16	(17)
1999	Rapid București	16	(11)
1999–2003	VfB Stuttgart	107	(34)
2003	Bursaspor	15	(5)
2004–2006	Wolverhampton Wanderers	32	(7)
2006	Dinamo București	18	(14)
2007	Rapid București	9	(2)
2007–2008	Politehnica Timișoara	18	(3)
2011	Sănătatea Cluj		
Total		337	(119)

International career
1999–2006	Romania	45	(19)

Managerial career
- 2009–2010: Dinamo București (assistant)
- 2010–2011: Dinamo II București
- 2011: Sănătatea Cluj (player/coach)
- 2012: Rapid Ghidighici
- 2013: Universitatea Cluj
- 2014: Rapid București
- 2015–2016: Dunărea Călărași
- 2016: Voluntari
- 2017: ASA Târgu Mureș
- 2018: ACS Poli Timișoara
- 2020–2021: Dunărea Călărași (technical director)
- 2026–: Chimia Orașul Victoria
- * Club domestic league appearances and goals

Ioan Viorel "Ionel" Ganea (born 10 August 1973) is a Romanian professional football coach and former player who played as a striker, currently in charge of Liga IV club Chimia Orașul Victoria.

== Club career ==
=== Early career ===
Ganea was born on 10 August 1973 in Făgăraș, Romania and began playing senior-level football in 1992 at Divizia B side ICIM Brașov. Two years later, coach Ioan Nagy brought him to FC Brașov, giving him his Divizia A debut on 20 August 1994 in a 3–1 away loss to Ceahlăul Piatra Neamț. In the middle of the 1995–96 season he was transferred to Universitatea Craiova with whom he reached the 1998 Cupa României final, being used by coach José Ramón Alexanko the entire match in the 1–0 loss to Rapid București. He started the 1998–99 season by netting 17 goals in just 16 appearances for Gloria Bistrița, transferring in the middle of it to Rapid where he scored 11 more, helping them win the title and also being the top-scorer of the season.

=== VfB Stuttgart ===
Ganea was transferred in the summer of 1999 to VfB Stuttgart who paid €1.75 million to Rapid. He made his Bundesliga debut on 14 August when coach Ralf Rangnick used him as a starter in a 0–0 draw against Werder Bremen. He scored his first two goals for the club on 18 September in a 4–2 home win over MSV Duisburg, managing another brace on 14 December in a 3–1 success against Hansa Rostock. The team started the following season by winning the 2000 Intertoto Cup, a campaign in which he made two appearances. Afterwards, they played in the UEFA Cup, with Ganea scoring a brace in a 3–1 victory against Tirol Innsbruck, and then closing the score in a 2–2 draw against Feyenoord, helping his side reach the round of 16 where they were defeated by Celta Vigo. In the same season, Ganea scored a hat-trick and provided three assists for Adhemar's hat-trick in a 6–1 win over Kaiserslautern in the league. Early in the 2001–02 season, Ganea netted both of his side's goals in a 2–2 draw against Nürnberg, ultimately finishing the season with 10 goals, a personal Bundesliga record for him. He started his last season at Stuttgart by helping the side win another Intertoto Cup, scoring a goal in each of the legs in the third round against Perugia, also playing in both legs of the 2–1 aggregate victory in the final against Lille. He scored a brace in a win over 1860 Munich and a hat-trick in another victory against VfL Bochum, contributing with nine goals as the team finished in second place in Bundesliga.

With 136 games played in which he scored 47 goals and provided 15 assists in all competitions for Stuttgart, Ganea was known during this period for his scoring ability after coming in the game as a substitute. Ganea claimed that his toughest opponents during his years spent in Germany were Lothar Matthäus and Jürgen Kohler, and he also cherished a shirt he received from Oliver Kahn.

=== Bursaspor ===
In the summer of 2003, after becoming free of contract, he signed with Turkish top-flight club Bursaspor that was coached by fellow Romanian Gheorghe Hagi, where he was teammates with compatriots Bogdan Vintilă, Iulian Miu and Cornel Frăsineanu. Ganea scored his first goal on 27 September in a 2–1 victory against Konyaspor, a game in which he also received a red card. He also scored a hat-trick on 2 November in a 6–0 win over Adanaspor and three weeks later he netted his last goal for Bursa in a 1–1 draw against Akçaabat Sebatspor.

=== Wolverhampton Wanderers ===
The striker joined Premier League club Wolverhampton Wanderers in December 2003 after his contract in Turkey was cancelled by mutual consent. He made his league debut on 10 January 2004, when coach Dave Jones sent him in the 82nd minute to replace Shaun Newton in a 2–0 away loss to Charlton Athletic. In 14 Premier League appearances he scored three goals during the 2003–04 season – against eventual champions Arsenal, Leeds and Newcastle – but could not prevent relegation.

Ganea remained with the club for two seasons in the second tier, mostly under the managership of Glenn Hoddle. The first of these years was written off after suffering cruciate knee ligament injury on a pre-season tour of Norway. He recovered for the 2005–06 season but never held down a regular starting place, and was released as his contract expired at the end of the campaign.

=== Return to Romania ===
In June 2006 he moved back to Romania, signing with Dinamo București on an initial one-year deal, claiming that one of the reasons he chose Dinamo was that he was good friends with its coach, Mircea Rednic. Ganea, along with Ionel Dănciulescu and Claudiu Niculescu, was part of a rotation system imposed by Rednic, as they were all prolific strikers but only two could start in any given match. Ganea scored his first goal on 20 August in a 3–1 home victory against Politehnica Timișoara, one week later managing to score all the goals in a 4–0 win over Universitatea Craiova. He scored a total of 14 goals in the first half of the season, also providing an assist for Niculescu's decisive goal in the 2–1 victory against Bayer Leverkusen in the 2006–07 UEFA Cup group stage which helped The Red Dogs reach the round of 32. However, in December, after just six months, Ganea broke his contract with Dinamo which managed to win the championship without him.

He rejoined Rapid București on a record €350,000 salary per year. He scored his first goal for Rapid on 1 April 2007 in a loss to rivals Steaua București, then another one in a victory against Ceahlăul Piatra Neamț, having a total of 16 goals scored in the season, being the league's second top-scorer with two goals behind former teammate Claudiu Niculescu. The team also won the Cupa României but coach Răzvan Lucescu did not use him in the 2–1 win over Politehnica Timișoara in the final.

In June 2007, Ganea was transferred from Rapid to Politehnica Timișoara in exchange for Ștefan Grigorie. On 7 May 2008 he made his last Liga I appearance in Politehnica's 4–1 home win over Farul Constanța in which he scored once, totaling 183 matches with 73 goals in the competition and 33 games with seven goals in European competitions (including 13 games with three goals in the Intertoto Cup).

He briefly returned on the pitch as a professional player only for one game on 22 September 2011 in a Cupa României match against Steaua București that ended with a 4–0 loss.

== International career ==
Ganea played 45 games and scored 19 goals for Romania, making his debut under coach Victor Pițurcă on 3 March 1999 in a friendly against Estonia, scoring both goals in a 2–0 win. He played five games in the successful Euro 2000 qualifiers in which he scored once in a 4–0 win over Azerbaijan and a brace in a 3–0 victory against Liechtenstein. He was used by coach Emerich Jenei in three games in the Euro 2000 final tournament, in all of them being sent on the field as a substitute. In the match against England, he scored in the last minutes of the game from a penalty the decisive goal of the 3–2 victory which helped Romania get past the group stage and reach the quarter-finals. There, he entered the field in the 54th minute to replace Viorel Moldovan in the eventual 2–0 loss to Italy. In July 2024, British tabloid newspaper, The Sun listed Ganea's penalty goal in England's top 18 disappointments suffered after winning the 1966 World Cup.

He played seven games and netted once in a 1–0 win over Lithuania in the 2002 World Cup qualifiers. Afterwards, he made eight appearances in the Euro 2004 qualifiers where he scored a goal in both victories against Bosnia and Herzegovina, once in a 1–1 draw against Norway and his last goal for The Tricolours in a 4–0 success over Luxembourg. Ganea's last appearance for the national team occurred on 6 September 2006 when coach Pițurcă sent him in the 78th minute to replace Ciprian Marica in a 2–0 away win over Albania in the Euro 2008 qualifiers.

For representing his country at the Euro 2000 final tournament, Ganea was decorated by President of Romania Traian Băsescu on 25 March 2008 with the Ordinul "Meritul Sportiv" – (The Medal "The Sportive Merit") class III.

== Managerial career ==
Ganea had his first coaching experience in 2009 when he was the assistant of Cornel Țălnar at Dinamo București. In 2010 he became the head coach of the club's satellite in the third league. After a short spell at Sănătatea Cluj, he had his only experience coaching abroad when in March 2012 he signed with Moldovan side Rapid Ghidighici where he coached compatriots Mădălin Militaru and Alexandru Bălțoi.

In January 2013, Ganea had his first experience coaching in the Romanian top-league, Liga I when he came in charge of Universitatea Cluj which he managed to help avoid relegation. However, next season in September he was dismissed by the club's officials.

At the beginning of the 2014–15 season he was appointed head coach at Rapid București with the objective of saving the club from relegation. In September 2014 after a 3–0 loss to Dinamo București and the team occupying a relegation position, the club owner Valerii Moraru replaced him with Marian Rada.

With five rounds before the end of the 2014–15 Liga III season, Dunărea Călărași appointed him as head coach, Ganea managing to win all the games and gain promotion to Liga II. In the first half of the following season he led Dunărea to the first position, leaving afterwards to coach Liga I club, FC Voluntari which he led 11 rounds, being dismissed after a 2–0 loss to CS Universitatea Craiova. After a year and a half without an appointment, in April 2017, Ganea took charge of ASA Târgu Mureș but the spell was unsuccessful as the team was relegated to the second division. He then coached ACS Poli Timișoara in the second division but left after three games, being unsatisfied with the training conditions provided by the club.

In September 2020 he made a comeback to Dunărea Călărași, this time working as a technical director, head coach being Cristian Pustai. However, he left the team in the summer of the following year as the club had financial problems and did not pay him for several months.

== Controversies ==
At the beginning of his career, while playing for FC Brașov, Ganea beat up the team captain Dorel Purdea.

During his stay at Universitatea Craiova, Ganea was involved in several controversies. He kicked his teammate Cornel Frăsineanu in the mouth, which caused him to lose several teeth and for a while he had to eat using a straw. Eugen Trică tried to calm him down but Ganea threatened to beat him too so Trică backed off. He also had a fight with Silvian Cristescu who threw a massage table at his head. On 2 May 1998, Rapid București needed to win the match against Universitatea Craiova to secure the Divizia A title, so they agreed with "U" Craiova's owner, George Ilinca, to allow them to win the game. Some players, including Ganea, did not agree to take part in the arrangement, and the game ended in a 2–2 draw with both of Craiova's goals being scored by Ganea, thus the title was won by Steaua București.

At VfB Stuttgart he had a fight with teammate Jochen Seitz, for which he was punished by the club with a fine of 10,000 marks. One day Ganea was eating an ice cream and coach Felix Magath saw him and told him that he should not be eating food that contains too many calories because he has weight issues. Ganea got mad and threw the ice cream at him.

In a Euro 2000 match against England, after being tackled hard by Sol Campbell without referee intervention, Ganea waited for Campbell to approach and when no officials were observing, he hit him and cussed him: "Motherfucker! Bitch!". In 2001, he had a fight with the goalkeeper Bogdan Stelea in a training session prior to a Romania – Italy game. During the match against the Italians, the striker nearly struck his coach, László Bölöni, enraged at being left on the bench. Later, during Romania's training camp for the 2002 World Cup qualification play-off against Slovenia, Ganea was playing rummy for money with Daniel Chiriță. Convinced that Chiriță was cheating, Ganea punched him in the eye and lunged at him, only to be pulled away by alert teammates. While playing for Romania against Scotland in April 2004, he tackled Celtic defender John Kennedy resulting in a knee injury that left Kennedy unable to play for three years. Kennedy has since been forced to retire from professional football as a result of this and subsequent injuries.

Steven Gerrard's autobiography contains an episode about an incident between him and Ganea in a Wolverhampton – Liverpool game played in January 2004: "He tore my leg from the knee to the ankle. Under the puttee, my leg was cut deep, a nasty wound". After finding out what Gerrard wrote about him in his autobiography, Ganea told the press: "I inform Gerrard that when I write my autobiography, I will not mention him. I will not have room for little girls". In April 2006, he was involved in more controversy when he criticised the Wolverhampton Wanderers manager at that time, Glenn Hoddle, claiming "he is the most difficult manager I have worked with in my career". Hoddle also fined him with a one-week salary for fighting at a training session with a teammate.

While playing for Rapid București in a match against Universitatea Craiova, he headbutted his opponent Michael Baird in the mouth during half-time.

In August 2007, after a Unirea Urziceni – Politehnica Timișoara game, the striker had a conflict with the president of Unirea, Mihai Stoica, with Ganea grabbing him by the neck until the gendarmerie officers separated them. One week later, Ganea attacked one of the assistant referees after being sent off during a match against Rapid București and received a 22-match ban, which was later reduced to 16. In his first match played against CFR Cluj after executing the 16-match suspension, he had a verbal conflict with former Universitatea Craiova teammate Eugen Trică before the beginning of the match, nearly starting a fight with him after the match.

In 2012, while attending Ioan Drăgan's funeral, who was his wedding's Godfather and a former FC Brașov teammate, he almost got into a fight with the priest, being unsatisfied with the preaching. While coaching Universitatea Cluj, he was accused by player Cristian Mureșan of beating him up, but Ganea denied the incident. During his coaching period at FC Voluntari, after a 1–0 victory against CSMS Iași, he had a conflict with a female journalist named Alina Iosub in which he offended and cursed at her, and she, in turn, threatened him, stating that he would not leave Botoșani alive if he came there.

His wife, Dana, to whom he was married for over 24 years, accused him of physical and verbal domestic violence and filed for divorce several times, also asking for a restraining order against him.

== Personal life ==
His son, George, is also a footballer.

On 9 May 2025, Ganea was involved in a car accident. His two-year-old son, who was riding in the car with him, suffered a traumatic brain injury, and died on 6 June 2025.

== Career statistics ==
Appearances and goals by national team and year
National team	Year	Apps	Goals
Romania	1999	9	6
Romania	2000	10	3
Romania	2001	6	2
Romania	2002	8	4
Romania	2003	7	4
Romania	2004	4	0
Romania	2005	0	0
Romania	2006	1	0
Total		45	19

Scores and results list Romania's goal tally first, score column indicates score after each Ganea goal.

List of international goals scored by Ionel Ganea
No.	Date	Venue	Opponent	Score	Result	Competition
1	3 March 1999	Stadionul Național, Bucharest, Romania	Estonia	1–0	2–0	Friendly
2	3 March 1999	Stadionul Național, Bucharest, Romania	Estonia	2–0	2–0	Friendly
3	28 April 1999	Stadionul Steaua, Bucharest, Romania	Belgium	1–0	1–0	Friendly
4	9 June 1999	Stadionul Steaua, Bucharest, Romania	Azerbaijan	1–0	4–0	UEFA Euro 2000 qualification
5	19 September 1999	Rheinpark Stadion, Vaduz, Liechtenstein	Liechtenstein	2–0	3–0	UEFA Euro 2000 qualification
6	19 September 1999	Rheinpark Stadion, Vaduz, Liechtenstein	Liechtenstein	3–0	3–0	UEFA Euro 2000 qualification
7	26 April 2000	Stadionul Gheorghe Hagi, Constanța, Romania	Cyprus	2–0	2–0	Friendly
8	20 June 2000	Stade du Pays de Charleroi, Charleroi, Belgium	England	3–2	3–2	UEFA Euro 2000
9	3 September 2000	Stadionul Steaua, Bucharest, Romania	Lithuania	1–0	1–0	2002 FIFA World Cup qualification
10	28 February 2001	GSP Stadium, Nicosia, Cyprus	Lithuania	1–0	3–0	Friendly
11	28 February 2001	GSP Stadium, Nicosia, Cyprus	Lithuania	2–0	3–0	Friendly
12	13 February 2002	Stade de France, Saint-Denis, France	France	1–2	1–2	Friendly
13	27 March 2002	Stadionul Gheorghe Hagi, Constanța, Romania	Ukraine	4–0	4–1	Friendly
14	17 April 2002	Zdzisław Krzyszkowiak Stadium, Bydgoszcz, Poland	Poland	1–0	2–1	Friendly
15	7 September 2002	Koševo City Stadium, Sarajevo, Bosnia and Herzegovina	Bosnia and Herzegovina	3–0	3–0	UEFA Euro 2004 qualification
16	12 February 2003	GSZ Stadium, Larnaca, Cyprus	Slovakia	2–1	2–1	Friendly
17	7 June 2003	Stadionul Ion Oblemenco, Craiova, Romania	Bosnia and Herzegovina	2–0	2–0	UEFA Euro 2004 qualification
18	11 June 2003	Ullevaal Stadion, Oslo, Norway	Norway	1–0	1–1	UEFA Euro 2004 qualification
19	6 September 2003	Stadionul Astra, Ploiești, Romania	Luxembourg	3–0	4–0	UEFA Euro 2004 qualification

== Honours ==
=== Player ===
Universitatea Craiova

- Cupa României runner-up: 1997–98

Rapid București

- Divizia A: 1998–99
- Cupa României: 2006–07

VfB Stuttgart

- Bundesliga runner-up: 2002–03
- Intertoto Cup: 2000, 2002

Dinamo București

- Liga I: 2006–07

Individual

- Divizia A top scorer: 1998–99 (28 goals)

=== Manager ===
Dunărea Călărași

- Liga III: 2014–15
