= Emmanuel Godfroid =

Belgian footballer

Personal information
- Date of birth: 16 August 1972 (age 54)
- Place of birth: Huy, Belgium
- Height: 1.80 m (5 ft 11 in)
- Position: Left midfielder

Youth career
- RFC Liège

Senior career*
Years	Team	Apps	(Gls)
1991–1994	RFC Liège	50	(9)
1994–1998	Royal Antwerp	106	(15)
1998–2002	Standard Liège	29	(5)
2002–2004	Rapid București	52	(8)
2004–2006	RFC Liège	29	(3)
2006–2010	RJS Bas-Oha (Note: The statistics for the 2008–09 season are unavailable.)	63	(12)
2010–2011	Solière Sport		
2011–2013	RFC Hannut		
2013	RAEC Sclayn		
Total		329	(52)

International career
1992	Belgium U21	1	(0)

Managerial career
- 2011: RFC Hannut
- * Club domestic league appearances and goals

Emmanuel "Manu" Godfroid (born 16 August 1972 in Huy, Belgium) is a Belgian former football player who played as a left midfielder.

== Club career ==
Godfroid was born on 16 August 1972 in Huy, Belgium. He began playing football at RFC Liège, making his Belgian First Division debut on 11 January 1992, when coach Robert Waseige sent him in the 83rd minute to replace Zvonko Varga in a 2–2 draw against Cercle Brugge. He scored his first goal in the competition on 20 March 1993 in a 3–0 home win over K. Boom F.C. In the 1993–94 season, Godfroid scored a career-best eight goals, including a brace in a 2–2 draw against KV Mechelen.

In 1994, Godfroid joined Royal Antwerp, where he started playing in European competitions, appearing in both legs of the 10–2 aggregate loss to Newcastle United in the 1994–95 UEFA Cup first round. He also played four matches in the 1997 Intertoto Cup. During his four-season spell, Godfroid played regularly for Royal Antwerp and managed to score a goal against each of the Big Three, which helped his side earn wins over Club Brugge and Standard Liège, and a draw against Anderlecht.

In 1998, he went to play for Standard Liège and netted five goals in his first season, including one goal in a loss to Beveren, a brace in a 6–0 victory against the same team, and two goals in two 1–0 wins over Germinal Ekeren and Lommel. However, in the following three seasons, Godfroid did not play a single match as he underwent several operations on his Achilles tendon.

In 2002, Godfroid was signed by Rapid București at the request of coach Mircea Rednic. His first achievement was winning the 2002 Supercupa României, as he played the entire match in the 2–1 victory against Dinamo București. Subsequently, he made his Divizia A debut on 18 August 2002 in a 2–1 win over Sportul Studențesc București, in which he scored the winning goal. In the following round, he scored another goal in a 5–2 victory against Oțelul Galați. He went on to score three more goals in another three victories over Politehnica Timișoara, Argeș Pitești and Gloria Bistrița. Those five goals scored in the 24 matches played under Rednic helped Rapid win the title, a performance earned while having compatriot Roberto Bisconti as a teammate. In the same season, Godfroid played three matches in the 2002–03 UEFA Cup and scored a goal that helped the team get past Gorica in the qualifying round, but they were defeated by Vitesse Arnhem in the following round. Afterwards, he played in both legs of the 3–2 aggregate loss to Anderlecht in the 2003–04 Champions League second qualifying round. Godfroid made his last Divizia A appearance on 26 November 2004 in a 3–0 home win over Sportul Studențesc București, totaling 52 matches with eight goals in the competition.

From 2006 to 2013, Godfroid played for teams in the Belgian lower leagues for teams such as RFC Liège, RJS Bas-Oha, Solière Sport, RFC Hannut and RAEC Sclayn. At the last-mentioned team, he played alongside his son, Arnaud.

== International career ==
On 22 April 1992, Godfroid played one match for Belgium U21 in the 1994 European Under-21 Championship qualifiers, which ended in a 3–0 home win over Cyprus.

== Honours ==
Rapid București

- Divizia A: 2002–03
- Supercupa României: 2002
