= Dorel Mutică =

Romanian footballer and manager

Personal information
- Date of birth: 14 March 1973 (age 53)
- Place of birth: Motru, Romania
- Height: 1.82 m (6 ft 0 in)
- Positions: Defender; midfielder

Team information
- Current team: Victoria Zăbrani (manager)

Youth career
- Minerul Motru

Senior career*
Years	Team	Apps	(Gls)
1990–1991	Aris Arad		
1991–1994	UTA Arad	40	(1)
1995–1996	Rapid București	37	(1)
1997	Brașov	14	(0)
1997–1998	CSM Reșița	33	(6)
1998–2001	Rapid București	77	(11)
2001	→ Electromagnetica București	1	(0)
2002–2004	Steaua București	42	(1)
2004	FC U Craiova	5	(0)
2005	Lombard Pápa	23	(0)
2006	FCM Reșița	10	(2)
2007–2009	Național Sebiș		
Total		281	(22)

International career^{‡}
1993–1994	Romania U21		
2000	Romania	3	(0)

Managerial career
- 2013–2014: Progresul Pecica
- 2014–2015: Frontiera Curtici
- 2016–2017: Progresul Pecica
- 2019–: Victoria Zăbrani
- * Club domestic league appearances and goals as of 29 July 2020 ‡ National team caps and goals as of 6 February 2000

Dorel Mutică (born 14 March 1973) is a Romanian former professional footballer and currently a manager. He played mainly as a defender for teams such as: UTA Arad, Rapid București, CSM Reșița, Steaua București or Lombard Pápa, among others. After retirement Mutică started his career as a football manager, occupying this position at fourth tier sides Frontiera Curtici and Progresul Pecica, both from Arad County, where Mutică settled.

His nickname, Mutamba, was given to him by Iulian Chiriță, after Congolese footballer Mutamba Kabongo.

== International career ==
Mutică played for Romania U21 since he was a second division player at UTA Arad, then he made his debut for the first representative of Romania on 2 February 2000 in a friendly match against Latvia.

== Personal life ==
Dorel Mutică is married to his wife, Mirela, for over 15 years and they have a son together, named Denis Alexandru.

== Honours ==
=== Player ===
Rapid București

- Divizia A: Winner 1998–99
- Cupa României: Runner-up 1994–95
- Supercupa României: Winner 1999; Runner-up 1998
