= Cristian Dulca =

Romanian football manager (born 1972)

Personal information
- Full name: Cristian Alexandru Dulca
- Date of birth: 25 October 1972 (age 54)
- Place of birth: Cluj-Napoca, Romania
- Height: 1.85 m (6 ft 1 in)
- Position: Defender

Youth career
- –1992: CFR Cluj

Senior career*
Years	Team	Apps	(Gls)
1992–1995	CFR Cluj	74	(6)
1995	Gloria Bistrița	12	(0)
1996–1998	Rapid București	79	(10)
1999	Pohang Steelers	17	(1)
2000	Ceahlăul Piatra Neamț	12	(1)
2000–2001	Gaz Metan Mediaș	3	(0)
2001	Universitatea Cluj	4	(0)
2002–2003	Kispest Honvéd	30	(0)
Total		231	(18)

International career
1997–1998	Romania	6	(0)

Managerial career
- 2003–2004: Minerul Iara
- 2004: Avântul Reghin
- 2009: Vaslui
- 2009–2010: Universitatea Cluj
- 2010: Universitatea Cluj
- 2010–2012: Delta Tulcea
- 2012: Universitatea Cluj
- 2012–2013: FC Vaslui (assistant)
- 2013–2014: Gaz Metan Mediaș
- 2015–2016: Romania U21
- 2017–2018: Luceafărul Oradea
- 2018: Energeticianul
- 2019: Universitatea Cluj
- 2021–2024: Romania women
- * Club domestic league appearances and goals

Cristian Alexandru Dulca (born 25 October 1972) is a Romanian professional football coach and former player, who played as a defender.

== Club career ==
As a player, Dulca represented CFR Cluj, Gloria Bistrița, Rapid București, Ceahlăul Piatra Neamț, Gaz Metan Mediaș and Universitatea Cluj in his native Romania. He also had two spells abroad in South Korea and Hungary, with Pohang Steelers and Budapest Honvéd, respectively.

In 2003, Dulca was forced to retire from football because of a congenital heart defect.

== International career ==
At international level, Dulca was included by head coach Anghel Iordănescu in the Romania national team squad for the 1998 FIFA World Cup. He totalled six appearances for the country between 1997 and 1998.

== Coaching career ==
Following his retirement from playing, Dulca became the head coach of Minerul Iara, the Divizia C feeder team for Universitatea Cluj. The next year, he coached another Divizia C team, Avântul Reghin, for 13 matches. In February 2005, Dulca became assistant executive director at Universitatea Cluj.

== Personal life ==
Dulca's son, Marco, is also a professional footballer and plays as a midfielder.

== Career statistics ==
Appearances and goals by national team and year
National team	Year	Apps	Goals
Romania	1997	1	0
Romania	1998	5	0
Total		6	0

== Honours ==
=== Player ===
Rapid București

- Divizia A: 1998–99
- Cupa României: 1997–98
- Supercupa României runner-up: 1998

=== Coach ===
Șirineasa

- Liga III: 2017–18
