= Marius Șumudică =

Romanian football manager and former player (born 1971)

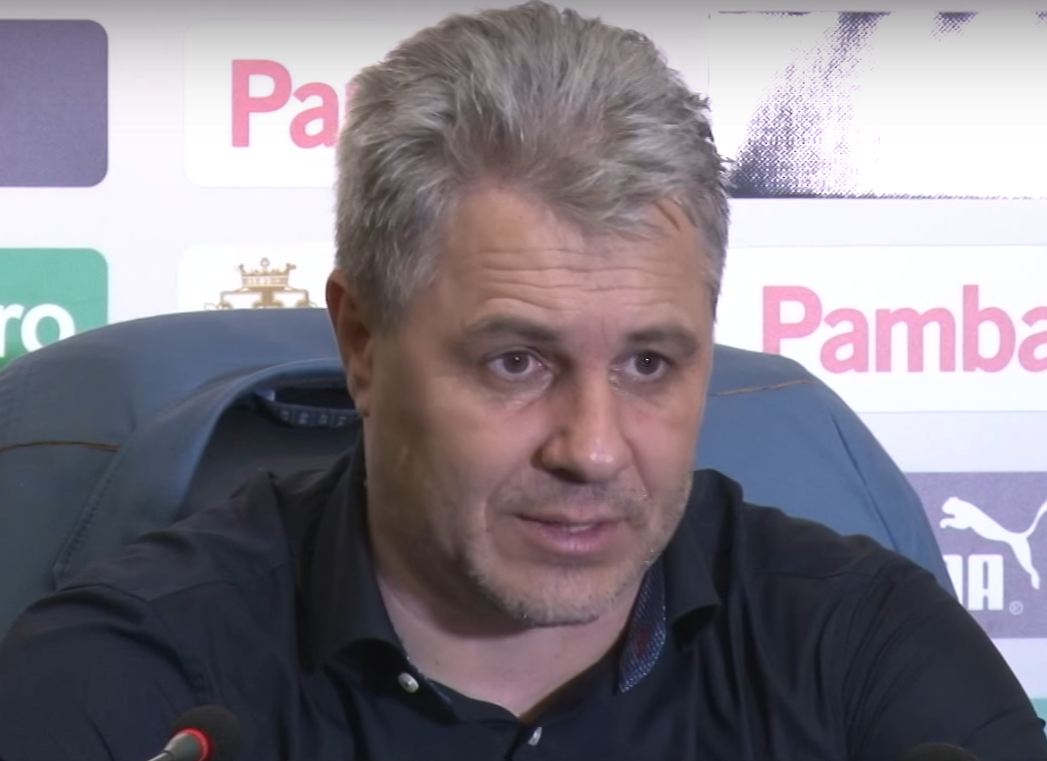
- Șumudică în 2016

Personal information
- Full name: Marius Ninel Șumudică
- Date of birth: 4 March 1971 (age 55)
- Place of birth: Bucharest, Romania
- Height: 1.79 m (5 ft 10 in)
- Position: Striker

Team information
- Current team: CFR Cluj (head coach)

Youth career
- 1978–1988: Sportul Studențesc

Senior career*
Years	Team	Apps	(Gls)
1989–1996	Sportul Studențesc	127	(26)
1992–1993	→ Dacia Unirea Brăila (loan)	11	(1)
1994	→ Corvinul Hunedoara (loan)	6	(1)
1996–1999	Rapid București	70	(26)
1999–2001	Marítimo	50	(7)
2001–2002	Rapid București	26	(9)
2002–2003	Debrecen	39	(21)
2004	Omonia	9	(6)
2004	UTA Arad	10	(3)
2005	Gloria Bistrița	2	(0)
Total		350	(100)

Managerial career
- 2005: Rapid București (assistant)
- 2005–2006: Rapid II București
- 2006–2007: Rocar București
- 2007: AS Dodu Berceni
- 2008: Inter Gaz București
- 2008: Progresul București
- 2009: Astra Ploiești
- 2009: Farul Constanța
- 2010: Gloria Bistrița
- 2010–2011: Rapid București
- 2011: Kavala
- 2011: Astra Ploiești
- 2011–2012: FC Brașov
- 2012: Vaslui
- 2012: Universitatea Cluj
- 2012–2013: Al-Shaab
- 2014–2015: Concordia Chiajna
- 2015–2017: Astra Giurgiu
- 2017–2018: Kayserispor
- 2018–2019: Al-Shabab
- 2019–2021: Gaziantep
- 2021: Çaykur Rizespor
- 2021: CFR Cluj
- 2021–2022: Yeni Malatyaspor
- 2022: Al-Shabab
- 2022–2023: Al-Raed
- 2023–2024: Gaziantep
- 2024–2025: Rapid București
- 2026: Al-Okhdood
- 2026–: CFR Cluj
- * Club domestic league appearances and goals

Marius Ninel Șumudică (born 4 March 1971) is a Romanian professional football manager and former player, currently in charge of Liga I club CFR Cluj.

Șumudică played as a striker and started out at Sportul Studențesc in 1989, going on to represent five other teams in his native country, as well as Marítimo, Debrecen, and Omonia abroad. In the 1998–99 season, he was part of Mircea Lucescu's Rapid București squad that won the national title, scoring 17 goals in the process. He also claimed two Cupa României trophies with "the White-Burgundies".

After retiring as a player, Șumudică returned to Rapid București as an assistant coach in 2005. He went on to manage numerous sides both home and abroad, notably bringing Astra Giurgiu its first Liga I title in the 2015–16 season at his third stint with the club. As a result, Șumudică was named the 2016 Romania Coach of the Year by the Gazeta Sporturilor newspaper. Apart from his time in Romania, he has coached teams in Greece, the United Arab Emirates, Saudi Arabia, and Turkey.

== Managerial career ==
=== Astra Giurgiu ===
On 28 April 2015, Șumudică was appointed as manager of Astra Giurgiu, following Dorinel Munteanu's resignation. It was his third term at the club, after two short spells in 2009 and 2011. He led the team to a 4th-place finish, qualifying them for the UEFA Europa League. The European campaign was almost a success, as Astra stopped short of reaching the Europa League group stages after knocking out West Ham United in the third round, but lost to AZ Alkmaar in the play-offs.

Domestically, despite the poor start which saw Astra losing 1–5 to previous runner-ups ASA Targu Mures, Astra managed to finish the regular season on first place, 3 points above Dinamo București. However, Șumudică was suspended 6 months by the Romanian FA on charges of betting on football matches. He later managed to have his sentence reduced to 2 months by appeal. Despite his suspension, Astra kept their momentum during the play-offs, ending up in them being crowned Liga I champions for the first time in their history, also marking Șumudică's first domestic title as manager.

After a quick exit to Danish champions Copenhagen in the UEFA Champions League, Șumudică managed to guide Astra to 2016–17 UEFA Europa League group stage eliminating West Ham – for the second time in a row – along the way, after a 1–0 win in London. In the group stages, he faced Roma, Viktoria Plzeň and Austria Wien. Despite losing the first two games of the group with Austria Wien (2–3 at Giurgiu) and Roma (0–4 in Italy), Astra managed two 2–1 away wins at Plzeň and Wien (along with a home draw with Viktoria) to stay in the race for a place in the knock-out stages. In the end, Astra's 0–0 draw with Roma and Austria Wien's failure against Plzeň in the last matchday secured Astra's place in the tournament's round of 32. There, they were eliminated by Belgian side Genk after a 2–2 draw at Giurgiu followed by 0–1 defeat in Belgium.

Astra's campaign in the league, meanwhile, was disappointing, with the team finishing 5th and losing the Romanian Cup final to FC Voluntari. However, due to Astra's position in the league and Voluntari not applying for a European license, the vacant spot was given to Astra, thus qualifying yet again in Europe.

=== Gaziantep ===
On 14 June 2019, Șumudică was appointed as manager of Turkish club Gaziantep. In January 2021, following an away defeat in the Süper Lig against Sivasspor, the club announced that they had parted ways with the Romanian manager, following a few weeks of tension and public discussion about his contract.

=== CFR Cluj ===
On 28 August 2021, CFR Cluj terminated the contract of Șumudică, ending his 3-month stint in charge after a disappointing campaign for Europe.

=== Al-Shabab ===
On 23 March 2022, Șumudică returned to manage Al-Shabab until the end of the 2021–22 season.

=== Al-Raed ===
On 30 June 2022, Șumudică was appointed as manager of Al-Raed.

== Managerial statistics ==
As of 21 November 2026

Managerial record by club and tenure
Team	From	To	Record				
Team	From	To	M	W	D	L	Win %
Rocar București	2006	2007	34	22	5	7	64.71
AS Dodu Berceni	2007	2007	17	7	3	7	41.18
Inter Gaz București	2008	2008	0	0	0	0	—
Progresul București	27 February 2008	15 December 2008	32	18	6	8	56.25
Farul Constanța	5 July 2009	15 November 2009	15	7	3	5	46.67
Gloria Bistrița	4 January 2010	31 May 2010	17	8	3	6	47.06
Rapid București	10 June 2010	28 April 2011	32	14	10	8	43.75
Kavala	15 July 2011	10 August 2011	0	0	0	0	—
Astra Ploiești	11 August 2011	31 October 2011	12	6	4	2	50.00
FC Brașov	2 November 2011	16 April 2012	14	5	2	7	35.71
Vaslui	11 July 2012	24 September 2012	13	4	5	4	30.77
Universitatea Cluj	9 November 2012	15 November 2012	1	0	0	1	0.00
Al Shaab	27 December 2012	31 December 2013	25	7	3	15	28.00
Concordia Chiajna	13 March 2014	6 April 2015	38	8	15	15	21.05
Astra Giurgiu	28 April 2015	8 June 2017	110	55	25	30	50.00
Kayserispor	3 July 2017	15 May 2018	39	18	9	12	46.15
Al Shabab	14 June 2018	13 June 2019	33	17	9	7	51.52
Gaziantep	14 June 2019	11 January 2021	51	20	19	12	39.22
Çaykur Rizespor	25 January 2021	4 March 2021	7	0	3	4	0.00
CFR Cluj	2 June 2021	28 August 2021	15	9	2	4	60.00
Yeni Malatyaspor	8 October 2021	7 February 2022	17	3	4	10	17.65
Al Shabab	23 March 2022	28 June 2022	12	7	3	2	58.33
Al Raed	1 July 2022	1 June 2023	31	9	7	15	29.03
Gaziantep	7 September 2023	6 March 2024	28	10	7	11	35.71
Rapid București	21 August 2024	20 May 2025	38	16	11	11	42.11
Al-Okhdood	5 January 2026	18 March 2026	14	2	2	10	14.29
CFR Cluj	14 August 2026	present	15	6	4	5	40.00
Total			659	277	164	218	42.03

== Honours ==
=== Player ===
Rapid București

- Divizia A: 1998–99
- Cupa României: 1997–98, 2001–02
- Supercupa României runner-up: 1998

Marítimo

- Taça de Portugal runner-up: 2000–01

=== Coach ===
Astra Giurgiu

- Liga I: 2015–16
- Supercupa României: 2016

CFR Cluj

- Supercupa României runner-up: 2021

Individual

- Gazeta Sporturilor Romania Coach of the Year: 2016
- Saudi Professional League Manager of the Month: December 2018
