= Lucian Marinescu =

Romanian footballer

Personal information
- Full name: Lucian Cristian Marinescu
- Date of birth: 24 June 1972 (age 54)
- Place of birth: Bucharest, Romania
- Height: 1.85 m (6 ft 1 in)
- Position: Midfielder

Senior career*
Years	Team	Apps	(Gls)
1993–1997	CSM Reșița	97	(26)
1997–1998	Rapid București	33	(13)
1998–2002	Salamanca	48	(4)
1999–2000	→ Farense (loan)	27	(11)
2002–2004	Académica	51	(8)
2004–2005	Chaves	30	(4)
2005–2006	Akratitos	27	(1)
Total		313	(67)

International career
1997–1998	Romania	8	(0)
- * Club domestic league appearances and goals

Lucian Cristian Marinescu (born 24 June 1972) is a Romanian former professional footballer who played as a midfielder, who works as football agent.

== Club career ==
Marinescu was born on 24 June 1972 in Bucharest, Romania. He began playing senior-level football in 1993 at CSM Reșița in Divizia B. In the 1996–97 season he scored 13 goals that helped Reșița earn promotion to the first league. In the following season he went to play for Rapid București, making his Divizia A debut on 6 August 1997 under coach Mircea Lucescu in a 2–0 away victory against Dinamo București. By the end of the season, Marinescu netted 13 league goals and won the Cupa României, with Lucescu using him the entire match in the 1–0 victory against Universitatea Craiova in the final in which he scored the goal from a penalty. He also represented The Railwaymen in the 1997 Intertoto Cup, playing in two games in the group stage, a 2–0 win over Žilina and a 1–1 draw against Austria Vienna.

Salamanca paid €1.3 million for Marinescu's transfer from Rapid in 1998, making his La Liga debut on 30 August under coach Miguel Ángel Russo in a 3–1 win against Deportivo La Coruña. He was a colleague of fellow Romanians Bogdan Stelea and Cătălin Munteanu, and during that time the team was nicknamed "Salamanca Rumana", because Ovidiu Stîngă and Gabriel Popescu also played for the club around that period. In his first season he made a total of 10 league appearances as the team was relegated. In the following season, Marinescu went to play for Farense, making his Primeira Liga debut on 17 October 1999 under coach Nicolau Vaqueiro in a 2–2 draw against Santa Clara in which he closed the scoring from a penalty. He scored a total of 11 goals until the end of the season, including a double in a 3–3 draw against Porto, helping his side finish in 14th place and avoid relegation. Afterwards he returned to Salamanca where he played two seasons in the second division.

In 2002, Marinescu came back to Portugal, spending the following two seasons at Académica in the first division. Then he went for one year in the second division at Chaves. In 2005, he was brought to Akratitos together with Bogdan Stelea by their compatriot Ilie Dumitrescu, who was the coach. His Super League Greece debut took place on 28 August 2005 in a 3–1 win over Iraklis. On 5 March 2006, he scored a goal in a 4–2 away victory against Panionios. That was his only goal in his 27 league appearances during the 2005–06 season, as the team suffered relegation and Marinescu ended his career afterwards.

== International career ==
Marinescu earned eight caps for Romania, making his debut on 19 November 1997 when coach Anghel Iordănescu sent him in the 67th minute to replace Iulian Filipescu in a friendly 1–1 draw against Spain.

He was selected by Iordănescu to be part of the squad that went to the 1998 World Cup final tournament where he played in all four games. In the group stage they earned victories in the first two rounds over Colombia and England, thus mathematically being qualified before the last group match against Tunisia. In order to celebrate, the players dyed their hair blonde and presented themselves like that at the game. In the round of 16 he made his last appearance for the national team as Iordănescu sent him in the 76th minute to replace Dan Petrescu in the 1–0 loss to Croatia.

== Sports agent career ==
After ending his playing career, he worked as a sports agent.

== Career statistics ==
Appearances and goals by national team and year
National team	Year	Apps	Goals
Romania
Romania	1997	1	0
Romania	1998	7	0
Total		8	0

== Honours ==
CSM Reșița

- Divizia B: 1996–97

Rapid București

- Cupa României: 1997–98
