= 1999 Supercupa României =

- Event: 1999 Supercupa României
Rapid București	Steaua București
Divizia A	Cupa României
5	0
- Date: 7 October 1999
- Venue: Stadionul Naţional, Bucharest
- Referee: Viorel Anghelinei (Galaţi)

The 1999 Supercupa României was the 4th edition of Romania's season opener cup competition. The match was played in Bucharest at Stadionul Naţional on 7 October 1999, and was contested between Divizia A title holders, Rapid and Cupa României champions, Steaua. Rapid won the trophy.

== Match ==
=== Details ===
7 October 1999
20:45 EEST

Rapid București	5–0	Steaua București
S. Radu 3', 69', 72'; Măldărășanu 25', 89'	(Report)

Stadionul Naţional, Bucharest
Attendance: 6,000
Referee: Viorel Anghelinei (Galaţi)

Rapid București	Steaua București

RAPID:
GK	22	(Romania) Marius Bratu
DF	25	(Romania) Daniel Chiriţă
DF	13	(Romania) Ion Voicu	(yellow card) 34'
MF	6	(Romania) Ovidiu Maier		(substituted off) 54'
DF	29	(Romania) Dorel Mutică
DF	2	(Romania) Nicolae Stanciu
MF	17	(Romania) Marius Măldărăşanu	(yellow card) 66'
MF	8	(Romania) Narcis Răducan		(substituted off) 60'
FW	19	(Romania) Sergiu Radu		(substituted off) 72'
MF	7	(Romania) Mugur Bolohan	(yellow card) 40'
MF	10	(Romania) Dănuţ Lupu
Substitutes:
MF	24	(Romania) Sorin Oncică		(substituted in) 54'
MF	20	(Romania) Constantin Schumacher		(substituted in) 60'
FW	9	(Romania) Dumitru Târțău		(substituted in) 72'
Manager:
(Romania) Mircea Lucescu

STEAUA:
GK	23	(Romania) Dumitru Hotoboc
DF	20	(Romania) George Ogăraru
DF	23	(Romania) Marius Iordache	(yellow card) 40'	(substituted off) 62'
DF	3	(Romania) Valeriu Bordeanu
DF	5	(Romania) Marius Baciu
DF	14	(Romania) Alexandru Zotincă
FW	21	(Romania) Marius Luca
MF	20	(Romania) Erik Lincar
FW	19	(Romania) Ionel Dănciulescu
MF	10	(Romania) Ionuţ Luţu
FW	9	(Romania) Cristian Ciocoiu
Substitutes:
MF	2	(Romania) Laurenţiu Reghecampf		(substituted in) 62'
Manager:
(Romania) Emerich Jenei

MATCH OFFICIALS

- Assistant referees:
  - Aurel Iordăchescu
  - Ion Mureşan
- Fourth official:

MAN OF THE MATCH

MATCH RULES

- 90 minutes.
- 30 minutes extra-time (15 minute intervals)
- Penalty shoot-out if scores level after extra time.
- Seven named substitutes
- Maximum of 3 substitutions.

== See also ==
- Derbiul Bucureștiului
- 1999–2000 Divizia A
- 1999–2000 Cupa României
