= Mugur Bolohan =

Romanian footballer

Mugur Cristian Bolohan
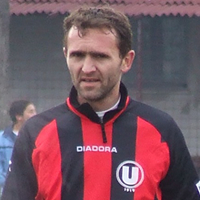

Personal information
- Date of birth: 28 May 1976 (age 50)
- Place of birth: Suceava, Romania
- Height: 1.76 m (5 ft 9 in)
- Position: Defender

Youth career
- CSŞ Suceava

Senior career*
| Years | Team | Apps | (Gls) |
| 1993–1995 | Naţional București | 33 | (2) |
| 1995–2000 | Rapid București | 103 | (6) |
| 2000–2002 | Dinamo București | 58 | (7) |
| 2003 | FCM Bacău | 12 | (0) |
| 2003 | Dinamo București | 1 | (0) |
| 2003 | Poiana Câmpina | 2 | (0) |
| 2004 | Universitatea Craiova | 13 | (1) |
| 2004–2007 | Nea Salamis Famagusta | 70 | (5) |
| 2007 | Universitatea Cluj | 9 | (0) |
| 2008 | Ilioupoli | ? | (?) |
| 2008–2009 | Cetatea Suceava | 9 | (0) |
| Total | | 310 | (21) |

International career
| 1996–2000 | Romania | 3 | (0) |

Managerial career
- 2013–2015: Unirea Slobozia (assistant)
- 2015: Berceni (assistant)
- 2016: Academica Clinceni
- 2016: Berceni
- * Club domestic league appearances and goals

Mugur Cristian Bolohan (born 28 May 1976) is a Romanian former professional footballer who played as a defender.

== Honours ==
Rapid București

- Liga I: 1998–99
- Cupa României: 1997–98
- Supercupa României: 1999

Dinamo București

- Liga I: 2001–02, 2003–04
- Cupa României: 2000–01
