= CFR II Cluj =

Romanian football club

- Full name: SC Fotbal Club CFR 1907 Cluj SA
- Nickname(s): CFR-iștii; Feroviarii (The Railwaymen); Alb-vișinii (The White and Burgundies)
- Short name: CFR II
- Founded: 2007; 2011 (Refounded); 2017 (Refounded)
- Dissolved: 2023
- Ground: Victoria Someșeni
- Capacity: 1,300
- 2022–23: Liga III, Seria X, 9th (relegated)
- Website: http://cfr1907.ro/

Fotbal Club CFR 1907 II Cluj, commonly known as CFR II Cluj (Romanian pronunciation: [t͡ʃefeˌre doi ˈkluʒ], was the reserve squad of Romanian first league side CFR Cluj.

== History ==
The team was founded in 2007, but dissolved after only two years in 2009. The team played for one season in Liga III in the 2008–2009 season. It was refounded in the summer of 2011 and played in Liga III and Liga IV, but for a short period, the team being dissolved again in 2013.

In the summer of 2017, the team was refounded and enrolled in Liga III.

== Honours ==
Liga IV – Cluj County

- Winners (1): 2007–08
- Runners-up (1): 2012–13

== League history ==
Season	League										National Cup	Continental	Other	Top scorer(s)		Notes
Season	Division (Tier)		Pos	P	W	D	L	GF	GA	Pts	National Cup	Continental	Other	Name	Goals	Notes
2007–08	L4 (4)	Cluj	1st	26	26	0	0	179	5	78	-		PO			
2008–09	L3 (3)	S6	3rd	34	17	7	10	62	43	58	R32					
2009–11 Not involved in any competitions
2011–12	L3 (3)	S6	10th	30	11	6	13	48	43	39	-					
2012–13	L4 (4)	Cluj	2nd	24	20	1	3	113	24	61	-					
2013–14	L4 (4)	Cluj	11th	24	6	2	16	34	58	20	-					
2014–17 Not involved in any competitions
2017–18	L3 (3)	S5	8th	28	13	5	10	53	36	44	-					
2018–19	L3 (3)	S5	8th	30	13	7	10	62	46	46	-					
2019–20	L3 (3)	S5	13th	16	4	3	9	21	35	15	-					
2020–21 Not involved in any competitions
2021–22	L3 (3)	S10	7th	18	6	3	9	22	26	21	-					
2022–23	L3 (3)	S10	9th	18						-	-					

== Former managers ==
- (Romania) Sorin Oncică (2007–2008)
