= Sergiu Radu =

Romanian footballer (born 1977)

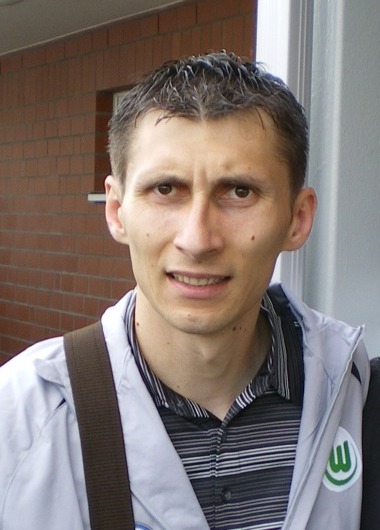
- Radu at VfL Wolfsburg in 2007

Personal information
- Full name: Sergiu Marian Radu
- Date of birth: 10 August 1977 (age 49)
- Place of birth: Râmnicu Vâlcea, Romania
- Height: 1.82 m (6 ft 0 in)
- Positions: Forward; attacking midfielder

Youth career
- Petrolul Drăgășani
- –1995: FC Vâlcea
- 1995–1996: Viitorul Oradea

Senior career*
Years	Team	Apps	(Gls)
1996–1998	Jiul Petroșani	14	(0)
1997–1998	→ Olimpia Satu Mare (loan)	23	(12)
1998–2001	Rapid București	54	(14)
2001–2003	Național București	68	(24)
2003–2004	Le Mans	13	(0)
2005	Național București	15	(7)
2005–2007	Energie Cottbus	67	(26)
2007–2009	VfL Wolfsburg	11	(2)
2008	→ VfB Stuttgart (loan)	2	(0)
2008–2009	→ 1. FC Köln (loan)	16	(2)
2009–2010	Energie Cottbus	30	(3)
2011–2012	Alemannia Aachen	41	(5)
Total		354	(95)

International career
2007	Romania	1	(0)
- * Club domestic league appearances and goals

Sergiu Marian Radu (born 10 August 1977) is a Romanian former professional footballer who played as a forward in Romania, France, and Germany at the top-tier level (Liga I, Ligue 1, and Bundesliga respectively). He had also earned one cap for Romania's national team in 2007 in a match against Belarus. In the latter part of his career, he also played in 2. Bundesliga.

He won the Liga I (then known as Divizia A) title and a Supercupa României with Rapid București at the end of the 1990s.

== Club career ==
=== Early career ===
Radu was born on 10 August 1977 in Râmnicu Vâlcea, Romania and began playing junior-level football at Petrolul Drăgășani. Subsequently, he moved to FC Vâlcea, ending his junior period at Viitorul Oradea.

He started his senior career at Jiul Petroșani where he made his Divizia A debut on 25 August 1996 in a 1–0 victory against Dinamo București. In the following season, Radu played for Olimpia Satu Mare in Divizia B, scoring 12 goals that helped them finish the championship in first place and gain promotion to Divizia A.

=== Rapid București ===
Radu was transferred by coach Mircea Lucescu to Rapid București where in his first season he scored two goals in 15 matches which helped the club win the title. They also reached the Cupa României final, but he did not play in the loss to Steaua București. In the following season he scored a hat-trick against Steaua in the 5–0 victory in the Supercupa României and 11 league goals as the team finished in second place. During this period, assistant coach Nicolae Manea gave him the nickname "Schijă" (The Shrapnel) after he described Radu's style of play as "quick and penetrating like a shrapnel bouncing off a bomb".

=== Național București and Le Mans ===
In the middle of the 2000–01 season, Radu joined Național București. There, under coach Cosmin Olăroiu, he helped them achieve a runner-up position in the 2001–02 season. In the following season the team was coached by Walter Zenga and he scored 12 goals in the league. He was also sent at halftime to replace Stelian Carabaș in the 1–0 loss to Dinamo in the Cupa României final. Radu appeared in all six matches in the 2002–03 UEFA Cup campaign as they eliminated Tirana against whom he scored two goals, and Heerenveen, being defeated with 3–0 on aggregate by Ronaldinho's Paris Saint-Germain.

In 2003 Radu made his first move to a foreign club, Le Mans in France. He made his Ligue 1 debut on 2 August, when coach Thierry Goudet sent him in the 77th minute to replace James Fanchone in a 0–0 away draw against Lens. However, his French spell was unsuccessful, as he was unable to score in 13 league matches and the club was relegated at the end of the season.

Subsequently, Radu returned to Național. There, he made his last Divizia A appearance on 11 June 2005 in a 2–1 victory against FCM Bacău in which he scored a goal, totaling 151 matches with 45 goals in the competition and 14 games with two goals in European competitions.

=== Energie Cottbus ===
He moved to Germany in 2005 to join Energie Cottbus in 2. Bundesliga, helping the club gain first-league promotion one year later, with Radu's contribution being 12 goals in 33 games. He made his league debut on 12 August 2006 when coach Petrik Sander used him as a starter in a 2–0 away loss to Borussia Mönchengladbach. In the next round, he scored his first goal in a 2–2 draw against Hamburg. Radu netted a personal record of 14 goals by the end of the 2006–07 season, including two doubles in a loss to Schalke 04 and a win over Borussia Mönchengladbach. He formed a partnership in the team's offence with fellow Romanian Vlad Munteanu and they were nicknamed "The Twins of the Goal" by the German press. With Radu's 14 goals and as Munteanu found the net 11 times, together they scored over half of the total 38 goals netted by the team that helped it avoid relegation.

=== VfL Wolfsburg and loans ===
In the summer of 2007, VfL Wolfsburg transferred him and Munteanu, paying €4.5 million for them, of which €3 million was for Radu. In the first half of the 2007–08 Bundesliga season he was used by coach Felix Magath in 11 matches in which he scored two goals in a loss to Arminia Bielefeld and a win over MSV Duisburg. Subsequently, Radu was sent for the second half on loan at fellow Bundesliga side VfB Stuttgart. There, he hoped that if he would be seen playing alongside Romanian international Ciprian Marica he would have more chances of being called-up at the national team by coach Victor Pițurcă. However, the spell ended being unsuccessful as he made only two league appearances, coach Armin Veh preferring to use Cacau or Mario Gómez instead of him. After not being part of Magath's plans for The Wolves in the 2008–09 season, he was loaned again, this time to 1. FC Köln, as coach Christoph Daum wanted him there. He played 16 league appearances, scoring two goals in a win over Karlsruher SC and a draw against VfL Wolfsburg. Radu made his last Bundesliga appearance on 18 April 2009 in Köln's 3–0 home loss to VfB Stuttgart, totaling 63 games with 18 goals in the competition.

=== Energie Cottbus and Alemannia Aachen ===
He returned to Energie Cottbus in 2. Bundesliga when on 17 July 2009 he signed a three-year contract, having fellow Romanians Emil Jula and Ovidiu Burcă as teammates. In the middle of the 2010–11 2. Bundesliga season, Radu signed with Alemannia Aachen and scored on his debut in the 4–2 win against Karlsruher SC. He decided to end his career at the end of the following season as the team was relegated to 3. Liga, having a total of 104 2. Bundesliga appearances with 19 goals.

== International career ==
In 2007, during his prolific season spent at Energie Cottbus together with Vlad Munteanu, the Romanian press insisted that they should be called-up for the national team but coach Victor Pițurcă did not agree, stating about the Bundesliga championship:"It's not what it once was! The clubs are at a low level and the players are of average value." However, later that year, in September after he was transferred to VfL Wolfsburg, Radu was called-up by Pițurcă to play for Romania. He played as a starter until he was replaced in the 57th minute with Florentin Petre in a 3–1 away victory against Belarus in the Euro 2008 qualifiers.

== Honours ==
Olimpia Satu Mare

- Divizia B: 1997–98

Rapid București

- Divizia A: 1998–99
- Supercupa României: 1999

VfL Wolfsburg

- Bundesliga: 2008–09
