= Iulian Dăniță =

Romanian footballer

Personal information
- Date of birth: 18 October 1975 (age 51)
- Place of birth: Buzău, Romania
- Height: 1.90 m (6 ft 3 in)
- Position: Defender

Senior career*
Years	Team	Apps	(Gls)
1993–1994	Gloria Buzău		
1994–1999	Dunărea Galați		
1999–2002	SV Sandhausen	66	(11)
2002–2003	Tavriya Simferopol	17	(0)
2003–2004	Chernomorets Novorossiysk	22	(2)
2004–2005	Metalist Kharkiv	14	(0)
2010–2011	FC Drobeta-Turnu Severin		
2011–2012	CF Brăila	16	(0)
2012–2013	Olimpia Râmnicu Sărat		
2013	Otopeni	5	(0)
2013–2016	Gloria Buzău	60	(4)
- * Club domestic league appearances and goals

Iulian Dăniță (born 18 October 1975) is a Romanian former football player.

5030-deniceyulian
