= Ovidiu Maier =

Romanian footballer

Personal information
- Date of birth: 2 February 1971 (age 55)
- Place of birth: Ocna Mureș, Romania
- Height: 1.80 m (5 ft 11 in)
- Position: Midfielder

Youth career
- –1988: Soda Ocna Mureș

Senior career*
Years	Team	Apps	(Gls)
1986–1988	Soda Ocna Mureș	?	(?)
1988–1992	ASA 1962 Târgu Mureș	102	(60)
1992–1995	Inter Sibiu	85	(10)
1995–1997	Universitatea Cluj	54	(9)
1997	Gloria Bistrița	22	(8)
1998–2000	Rapid București	41	(1)
2000–2001	Soda Ocna Mureș	?	(?)
2001–2002	Minaur Zlatna	13	(3)
2002–2005	Apulum Alba Iulia	71	(20)
2007–2008	PNG Aiud	?	(?)
2009–2012	Progresul Fărău	?	(?)
2014–2015	Viitorul Vama Seacă	?	(?)
2015–2019	Ocna Mureș	?	(?)
Total		388	(111)

International career^{‡}
1990–1992	Romania U-21	1	(0)

Managerial career
- 2015–2019: Ocna Mureș (assistant)
- 2019–2022: Inter Unirea (assistant)
- * Club domestic league appearances and goals as of 2 May 2016 ‡ National team caps and goals as of 2 May 2016

Ovidiu Maier (born 2 February 1971) is a Romanian former professional footballer. A precocious talent, Maier was given the nickname Motanul (The Tomcat), a name that stuck with him throughout his career. In summer 2022 he has been replaced by Radu Andone as manager of CS Inter Unirea.

== Honours ==
ASA 1962 Târgu Mureș

- Divizia B: 1990–91

Rapid București

- Divizia A: 1998–99
- Cupa României: 1997–98
- Supercupa României: 1999

Apulum Alba Iulia

- Divizia B: 2002–03
