= 1998–99 Divizia A =

81st season of top-tier football league in Romania

Divizia A
- Season: 1998–99
- Champions: Rapid București
- Relegated: Foresta Fălticeni; Universitatea Cluj; Olimpia Satu Mare
- Champions League: Rapid București
- UEFA Cup: Dinamo București; Steaua București
- Intertoto Cup: Bacău; Ceahlăul Piatra Neamţ
- Matches: 306
- Goals: 888 (2.9 per match)
- Top goalscorer: Ionel Ganea (28)
- Biggest home win: Dinamo 8–0 Cluj
- Biggest away win: Cluj 0–6 Dinamo
- Highest scoring: Dinamo 8–0 Cluj
- Longest winning run: Dinamo, Rapid (10)
- Longest unbeaten run: Rapid (23)
- Longest losing run: Olimpia (13)

The 1998–99 Divizia A was the eighty-first season of Divizia A, the top-level football league of Romania.

== Teams ==
Location of teams in 1998-99 Divizia A

== League table ==
Pos	Team	Pld	W	D	L	GF	GA	GD	Pts	Qualification or relegation
1	Rapid București (C)	34	28	5	1	79	18	+61	89	Qualification to Champions League second qualifying round
2	Dinamo București	34	26	4	4	95	27	+68	82	Qualification to UEFA Cup qualifying round
3	Steaua București	34	19	9	6	62	33	+29	66	Qualification to UEFA Cup qualifying round
4	Argeș Pitești	34	20	4	10	57	37	+20	64	
5	Bacău	34	18	8	8	46	35	+11	62	Qualification to Intertoto Cup first round
6	Oțelul Galați	34	17	4	13	47	33	+14	55 (Note: OTE 3-2 PRO; PRO 0-1 OTE)	
7	Național București	34	18	1	15	61	51	+10	55	
8	Petrolul Ploiești	34	16	5	13	50	46	+4	53	
9	Ceahlăul Piatra Neamț	34	15	4	15	54	53	+1	49	Qualification to Intertoto Cup first round
10	Astra Ploiești	34	13	7	14	40	38	+2	46	
11	Gloria Bistrița	34	12	7	15	55	60	−5	43	
12	Farul Constanța	34	12	4	18	37	54	−17	40	
13	Universitatea Craiova	34	11	6	17	43	50	−7	39 (Note: CRA 4-2 ONE; ONE 3-2 CRA)	
14	FC Onești	34	12	3	19	56	67	−11	39	
15	Reșița	34	8	11	15	34	59	−25	35	
16	Foresta Suceava (R)	34	6	6	22	31	61	−30	24	Relegation to Divizia B
17	Universitatea Cluj (R)	34	4	4	26	19	92	−73	16	Relegation to Divizia B
18	Olimpia Satu Mare (R)	34	3	4	27	22	74	−52	13	Relegation to Divizia B

Source: LT (in Romanian)
Rules for classification: 1) points; 2) head-to-head points; 3) head-to-head goal difference; 4) head-to-head goals scored; 5) goal difference; 6) number of goals scored.
(C) Champions; (R) Relegated

=== Positions by round ===
Team ╲ Round	1	2	3	4	5	6	7	8	9	10	11	12	13	14	15	16	17	18	19	20	21	22	23	24	25	26	27	28	29	30	31	32	33	34
Argeș Pitești	2	7	9	6	9	6	6	4	6	6	6	4	6	7	6	5	5	6	5	4	5	6	6	6	5	6	7	7	6	4	4	4	4	4
Astra Ploiești	5	5	10	9	12	7	10	8	10	9	9	9	9	9	9	9	9	9	10	10	10	10	10	10	10	10	10	10	9	9	10	10	10	10
Bacău	8	6	3	3	3	3	5	5	5	4	5	6	3	5	4	6	6	4	4	5	4	4	4	4	4	4	4	5	4	5	5	5	5	5
Reșița	18	16	14	16	16	14	15	16	16	15	16	14	15	15	15	15	15	14	14	14	15	15	15	15	15	15	15	15	15	15	15	15	15	15
Ceahlăul Piatra Neamț	15	18	12	11	10	11	11	12	14	14	14	15	14	13	11	12	11	10	9	9	9	9	9	9	9	9	9	8	10	10	9	9	9	9
Universitatea Craiova	10	12	15	12	13	15	13	14	12	12	12	13	12	11	13	13	14	15	15	15	14	14	14	14	14	14	14	13	12	12	12	12	13	13
Dinamo București	1	1	1	1	1	1	1	1	1	2	2	1	2	1	1	1	2	2	2	2	2	1	1	1	1	1	1	1	2	2	2	2	2	2
Farul Constanța	6	4	11	14	11	12	12	13	11	11	11	11	13	12	14	14	13	11	12	12	12	13	13	13	13	12	12	11	11	11	11	11	12	12
Foresta Fălticeni	13	17	18	18	18	18	17	18	18	18	18	18	18	18	18	18	18	18	18	18	17	16	16	16	16	16	16	16	16	16	16	16	16	16
Gloria Bistrița	7	11	5	7	6	8	9	10	9	10	10	10	10	10	10	10	10	12	11	13	13	11	12	11	12	11	11	12	13	13	13	13	11	11
Olimpia Satu Mare	16	8	13	15	15	17	18	15	15	16	15	17	17	17	16	16	16	16	16	16	16	17	17	17	17	17	17	17	17	17	17	18	18	18
FC Onești	17	15	17	13	14	13	14	11	13	13	13	12	11	14	12	11	12	13	13	11	11	12	11	12	11	13	13	14	14	14	14	14	14	14
Oțelul Galați	14	9	6	5	4	4	3	3	3	5	4	5	8	8	7	8	7	7	6	6	6	5	5	5	6	7	6	4	7	7	7	6	6	6
Petrolul Ploiești	4	10	7	8	7	9	7	9	7	7	8	8	5	6	8	7	8	8	8	8	8	7	8	8	8	8	8	9	8	8	8	8	7	8
Național București	3	2	4	4	5	5	4	6	4	3	3	3	4	3	5	4	4	5	7	7	7	8	7	7	7	5	5	6	5	6	6	7	8	7
Rapid București	9	3	2	2	2	2	2	2	2	1	1	2	1	2	2	2	1	1	1	1	1	2	2	2	2	2	2	2	1	1	1	1	1	1
Steaua București	11	13	8	10	8	10	8	7	8	8	7	7	7	4	3	3	3	3	3	3	3	3	3	3	3	3	3	3	3	3	3	3	3	3
Universitatea Cluj	12	14	16	17	17	16	16	17	17	17	17	16	16	16	17	17	17	17	17	17	18	18	18	18	18	18	18	18	18	18	18	17	17	17

Source: LT (in Romanian)

=== Results ===
Home \ Away	ARG	AST	BAC	RES	CEA	UCR	DIN	FAR	FOR	GBI	OLI	ONE	OȚE	PET	NAT	RAP	STE	UCL
Argeș Pitești	—	1–2	0–3	1–0	1–0	2–0	2–1	6–0	1–1	2–1	3–1	2–0	2–1	3–1	1–0	0–1	3–2	3–0
Astra Ploiești	0–1	—	1–1	3–0	0–0	2–2	0–1	4–0	1–0	3–1	3–1	3–1	3–1	1–1	1–2	1–5	1–1	2–1
Bacău	3–2	2–0	—	2–0	0–0	2–0	0–2	1–0	4–1	3–1	2–1	2–1	1–0	3–1	4–1	1–1	0–0	0–0
Reșița	0–0	0–1	0–0	—	2–2	3–2	1–1	3–2	1–1	2–0	1–1	0–2	2–3	2–1	4–1	1–2	2–2	3–0
Ceahlăul Piatra Neamț	1–2	3–1	4–1	4–0	—	2–1	1–0	2–0	2–1	3–2	4–0	3–1	1–1	1–3	1–0	0–2	0–3	5–1
Universitatea Craiova	2–0	0–0	0–1	0–1	2–1	—	2–2	1–0	1–0	2–1	5–1	4–2	0–1	2–0	0–2	0–1	2–2	4–1
Dinamo București	1–0	2–0	1–0	7–0	6–1	2–1	—	2–1	4–1	3–0	5–0	3–1	2–1	3–1	5–0	0–1	0–0	8–0
Farul Constanța	0–2	1–0	2–0	0–0	2–1	2–1	1–3	—	3–2	3–1	3–1	2–0	0–1	1–0	0–1	0–0	0–3	3–1
Foresta Fălticeni	2–2	0–1	0–1	0–0	0–2	1–2	2–3	2–0	—	0–0	2–0	3–1	1–2	1–2	1–0	0–1	1–2	1–0
Gloria Bistrița	3–1	1–0	2–0	2–2	4–2	1–1	2–3	4–2	5–0	—	3–1	3–1	2–1	2–0	2–4	2–4	2–1	4–0
Olimpia Satu Mare	0–3	1–2	0–2	1–3	0–1	1–1	0–4	0–3	0–1	1–0	—	1–6	0–1	3–0	3–1	1–1	0–3	0–1
FC Onești	0–3	2–0	2–2	5–0	3–1	3–2	1–4	2–2	3–1	1–1	1–0	—	1–0	2–0	2–3	1–2	2–3	6–0
Oțelul Galați	1–1	1–1	0–1	4–0	1–2	4–0	2–1	2–1	1–0	0–0	2–0	3–0	—	0–1	3–2	0–1	2–0	5–0
Petrolul Ploiești	3–1	2–1	1–1	2–0	1–0	4–1	2–3	3–0	2–1	3–1	0–0	1–0	2–0	—	1–3	2–2	2–1	3–0
Național București	2–3	1–0	5–0	3–0	4–2	1–0	1–2	0–0	4–1	5–1	2–1	3–0	0–1	2–0	—	1–3	0–1	3–1
Rapid București	2–0	1–0	3–0	2–1	4–0	1–0	1–4	3–0	2–0	5–0	1–0	6–0	3–0	2–1	5–0	—	3–0	3–0
Steaua București	1–2	1–0	2–1	2–0	3–2	2–0	1–1	1–0	6–1	0–0	3–2	4–1	2–0	2–2	1–0	1–1	—	4–0
Universitatea Cluj	2–1	0–2	1–2	0–0	1–0	1–2	0–6	1–3	2–2	1–1	1–0	0–2	0–2	1–2	1–4	1–4	0–2	—

Source: LT (in Romanian)
Legend: Blue = home team win; Yellow = draw; Red = away team win.

== Top goalscorers ==
Position	Player	Club	Goals
1	Ionel Ganea	Gloria Bistriţa / Rapid București	28
2	Constantin Barbu	Argeş Piteşti / Rapid București	21
3	Marian Savu	Naţional București	19
4	Adrian Mihalcea	Dinamo București	18
5	Marius Șumudică	Rapid București	17

== Champion squad ==
Rapid București

Goalkeepers: Bogdan Lobonț (31 / 0); Marius Bratu (4 / 0).
Defenders: Nicolae Stanciu (28 / 1); Cristian Dulca (14 / 3); Mircea Rednic (32 / 1); Dorel Mutică (22 / 4); Adrian Iencsi (26 / 3); Vasile Popa (1 / 0); Bogdan Andone (14 / 0); Daniel Chiriță (3 / 1); Ion Voicu (5 / 0).
Midfielders: Mugur Bolohan (22 / 1); Ioan Ovidiu Sabău (22 / 1); Dănuț Lupu (28 / 5); Marius Măldărășanu (33 / 4); Daniel Pancu (27 / 6); Ștefan Nanu (23 / 1); Zeno Bundea (25 / 6); Mario Bugeanu (2 / 0); Alin Minteuan (4 / 0); Răzvan Raț (3 / 0).
Forwards: Marius Șumudică (31 / 17); Sergiu Radu (15 / 2); Ovidiu Maier (22 / 1); Radu Niculescu (8 / 2); Ionel Ganea (16 / 11); Constantin Barbu (11 / 8).
(league appearances and goals listed in brackets)

Manager: *Mircea Lucescu / Mircea Rednic / Dumitru Dumitriu / Nicolae Manea.

- Mircea Lucescu also coached in the final matches of the season
