= 2001–02 Cupa României =

Tournament details
- Country: Romania

Final positions
- Champions: Rapid București
- Runners-up: Dinamo București

The 2001–02 Cupa României was the 64th edition of Romania's most prestigious football cup competition.

The title was won by Rapid București against Dinamo București.

== Format ==
The competition is an annual knockout tournament.

First round proper matches are played on the ground of the lowest ranked team, then from the second round proper the matches are played on a neutral location.

If a match is drawn after 90 minutes, the game goes into extra time, where it works golden goal rule. If the match is still tied, the result is decided by penalty kicks.

In the semi-finals, each tie is played as a two legs.

From the first edition, the teams from Divizia A entered in competition in sixteen finals, rule which remained till today.

== First round proper ==
Team 1	Score	Team 2
10 October 2001
Extensiv Craiova (Div. B)	1–0	(Div. A) Naţional București
Minaur Zlatna (Div. B)	2–0	(Div. A) Petrolul Ploiești
Foresta Suceava (Div. B)	0–2	(Div. A) Astra Ploieşti
Politehnica Timișoara (Div. B)	1–3	(Div. A) Rapid București
CFR Cluj (Div. C)	0–1	(Div. A) Gloria Bistrița
Petrolul Moinești (Div. B)	0–3	(Div. A) FCM Bacău
Gloria Buzău (Div. C)	0–2	(Div. A) Argeș Pitești
Bihor Oradea (Div. B)	2–1	(Div. A) Oțelul Galați
Cimentul Fieni (Div. B)	1–1 (a.e.t.) (4–3 p)	(Div. A) FC U Craiova
ARO Câmpulung (Div. B)	1–3	(Div. A) Ceahlăul Piatra Neamț
Dinamo Poiana Câmpina (Div. B)	0–2	(Div. A) FC Brașov
FC Sfântu Gheorghe (Div. C)	1–1 (a.e.t.) (5–6 p)	(Div. A) UM Timișoara
CSM Reșița (Div. B)	1–0	(Div. A) Farul Constanța
Electrica Constanța (Div. C)	0–3	(Div. A) Sportul Studențesc București
ASA 1962 Târgu Mureș (Div. B)	0–2	(Div. A) Steaua București
Electromagnetica București (Div. B)	2–3	(Div. A) Dinamo București

== Second round proper ==
Team 1	Score	Team 2
31 October 2001
Rapid București	2–0	Argeș Pitești
Dinamo București	6–0	Sportul Studențesc București
UM Timișoara	0–4	Astra Ploieşti
Minaur Zlatna	0–5	FC Brașov
CSM Reșița	1–2	Steaua București
Gloria Bistrița	0–1	Extensiv Craiova
FCM Bacău	1–2	Bihor Oradea
Ceahlăul Piatra Neamț	1–0	Cimentul Fieni

== Quarter-finals ==
Team 1	Score	Team 2
3 April 2002
Extensiv Craiova	0–0 (a.e.t.) (3–4 p)	Steaua București
FC Brașov	0–0 (a.e.t.) (2–3 p)	Dinamo București
Bihor Oradea	0–5	Rapid București
Astra Ploieşti	2–1 (a.e.t.)	Ceahlăul Piatra Neamț

== Semi-finals ==
The matches were played on 24 April and 8 May 2002.

Team 1	Agg.	Team 2	1st leg	2nd leg
Astra Ploieşti	2–2	Rapid București	2–2	0–0
Steaua București	1–4	Dinamo București	0–1	1–3

== Final ==
5 June 2002
21:00 EEST

Rapid București	2–1	Dinamo București
Măldărășanu 74'; Pancu 85'	Report	Dănciulescu 93'

Stadionul Național, Bucharest
Attendance: 40,000
Referee: Cristian Balaj (Romania)

Cupa României 2001–02 winners

11th title
