= 1997–98 Cupa României =

Tournament details
- Country: Romania

Final positions
- Champions: Rapid București
- Runners-up: FC U Craiova

The 1997–98 Cupa României was the 60th edition of Romania's most prestigious football cup competition.

The title was won by Rapid București against FC U Craiova.

== Format ==
The competition is an annual knockout tournament.

First round proper matches are played on the ground of the lowest ranked team, then from the second round proper the matches are played on a neutral location.

If a match is drawn after 90 minutes, the game goes into extra time. If the match is still tied, the result is decided by penalty kicks.

From the first edition, the teams from Divizia A entered in competition in sixteen finals, rule which remained till today.

== First round proper ==
Team 1	Score	Team 2
12 November 1997
Apulum Alba Iulia (Div. B)	2–1	(Div. A) CSM Reșița
Maramureș Baia Mare (Div. B)	0–2	(Div. A) Argeș Pitești
Gloria Bistrița (Div. A)	3–2 (a.e.t.)	(Div. A) Chindia Târgoviște
Metrom Brașov (Div. B)	0–1	(Div. A) FCM Bacău
Gloria Buzău (Div. B)	3–2	(Div. A) Universitatea Cluj
Dunărea Călărași (Div. B)	1–3	(Div. A) Steaua București
Electroputere Craiova (Div. B)	1–0	(Div. A) Petrolul Ploiești
Diplomatic Focșani (Div. C)	0–1 (a.e.t.)	(Div. A) Farul Constanța
Corvinul Hunedoara (Div. B)	0–1	(Div. A) Dinamo București
Gaz Metan Mediaș (Div. B)	1–0	(Div. A) Ceahlăul Piatra Neamț
Midia Năvodari (Div. B)	0–1	(Div. A) Rapid București
Bihor Oradea (Div. C)	4–0	(Div. A) Jiul Petroșani
Laminorul Roman (Div. C)	2–5	(Div. A) Oțelul Galați
Foresta Suceava (Div. A)	2–2 (a.e.t.) (3-4 p)	(Div. A) FC U Craiova
Politehnica Timișoara (Div. B)	1–2	(Div. A) Sportul Studenţesc București
19 November 1997
Poiana Câmpina (Div. B)	1–1 (a.e.t.) (4-2 p)	(Div. A) Naţional București

== Second round proper ==
Team 1	Score	Team 2
2 December 1997
Steaua București	3–1	Poiana Câmpina
Rapid București	2–1	Gaz Metan Mediaș
Gloria Bistrița	0–1	Sportul Studenţesc București
FC U Craiova	5–2	Farul Constanța
Oțelul Galați	6–0	Gloria Buzău
FCM Bacău	3–1	Electroputere Craiova
Dinamo București	2–0	Apulum Alba Iulia
Argeș Pitești	1–0	Bihor Oradea

== Quarter-finals ==
Team 1	Score	Team 2
25 February 1998
Rapid București	1–0	Sportul Studenţesc București
Dinamo București	1–0	Oțelul Galați
FC U Craiova	2–1 (a.e.t.)	FCM Bacău
Argeș Pitești	1–1 (a.e.t.) (3-1 p)	Steaua București

== Semi-finals ==
Team 1	Score	Team 2
25 March 1998
Rapid București	2–1	Dinamo București
Argeș Pitești	0–1	FC U Craiova

== Final ==
6 May 1998
21:00 EEST

Rapid București	1–0	Universitatea Craiova
Marinescu 68' (pen.)	Report

Stadionul Naţional, Bucharest
Attendance: 65,000
Referee: Marcel Lică (Romania)

Cupa României 1997–98 winners

10th title

== See also ==
- 1997–98 Divizia A
- 1997–98 Divizia B
- 1997–98 Divizia C
- 1997–98 Divizia D
