= CS Rapid București =

Romanian multi-sport club

- Full name: Clubul Sportiv Rapid Bucuresti
- Nickname: giuleştenii (The People of Giulești); Alb-vișinii (The White-Burgundies); Feroviarii (The Railwaymen)
- Founded: 1923; 103 years ago
- Based in: Bucharest, Romania
- Colours: White, Burgundy
- President: Valy Caciuriac
- Website: Club home page

Clubul Sportiv Rapid București is a Romanian multi-sport club based in Bucharest, Romania.

== History ==
The club was founded as Asociația Culturală și Sportivă CFR in 1923.

== Men's Football section ==
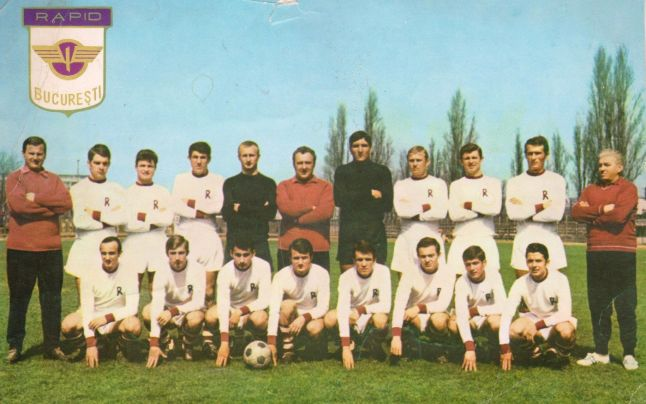
Rapid, champions of Romania in 1967

=== Domestic ===
- Liga I
  - Winners (3): 1966–67, 1998–99, 2002–03
  - Runners-up (14): 1936–37, 1937–38, 1939–40, 1940–41, 1948–49, 1950, 1963–64, 1964–65, 1965–66, 1969–70, 1970–71, 1997–98, 1999–00, 2005–06
- Cupa României
  - Winners (13): 1934–35, 1936–37, 1937–38, 1938–39, 1939–40, 1940–41, 1941–42, 1971–72, 1974–75, 1997–98, 2001–02, 2005–06, 2006–07
  - Runners-up (6): 1960–61, 1961–62, 1967–68, 1994–95, 1998–99, 2011–12
- Supercupa României
  - Winners (4): 1999, 2002, 2003, 2007
  - Runners-up (2): 1998, 2006

=== International ===
- Balkans Cup
  - Winners (2): 1964, 1966

== Women's Handball section ==
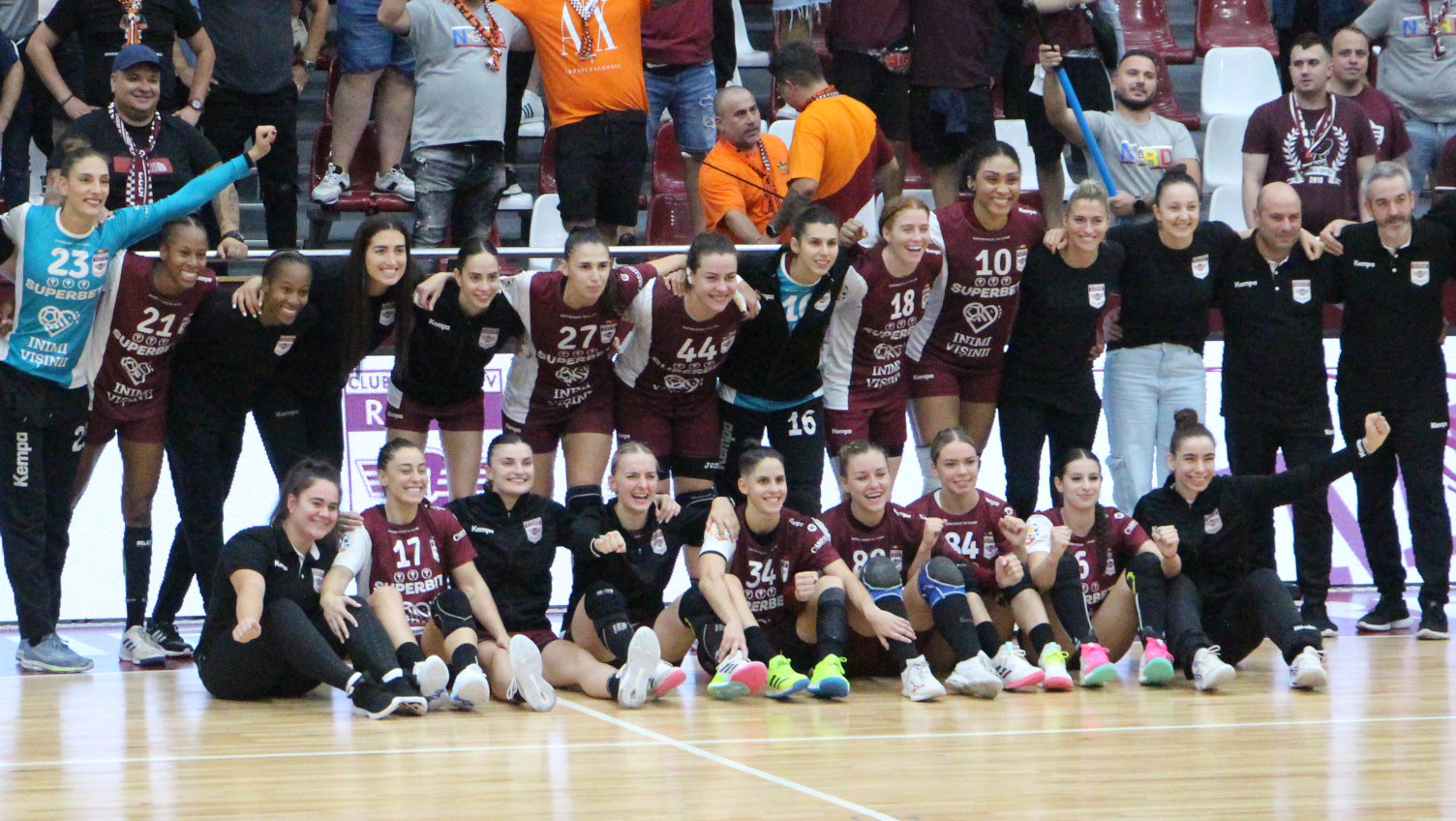
Rapid players celebrating after a victory in 2023

=== Domestic ===
- Liga Națională
  - Winners (5): 1960–61, 1961–62, 1962–63, 1966–67, 2002–03, 2021–22
  - Runners-up (5): 1963–64, 1965–66, 1992–93, 1994–95, 2004–05
- National Cup
  - Winners (1): 2003–04
  - Runners-up (2): 1991–92, 1993–94

=== International ===
- EHF European Champions Cup:
  - Winners (1): 1963–64
- EHF Cup:
  - Winners (1): 1992–93
- EHF Challenge Cup:
  - Winners (1): 1999–00

== Men's Volleyball section ==
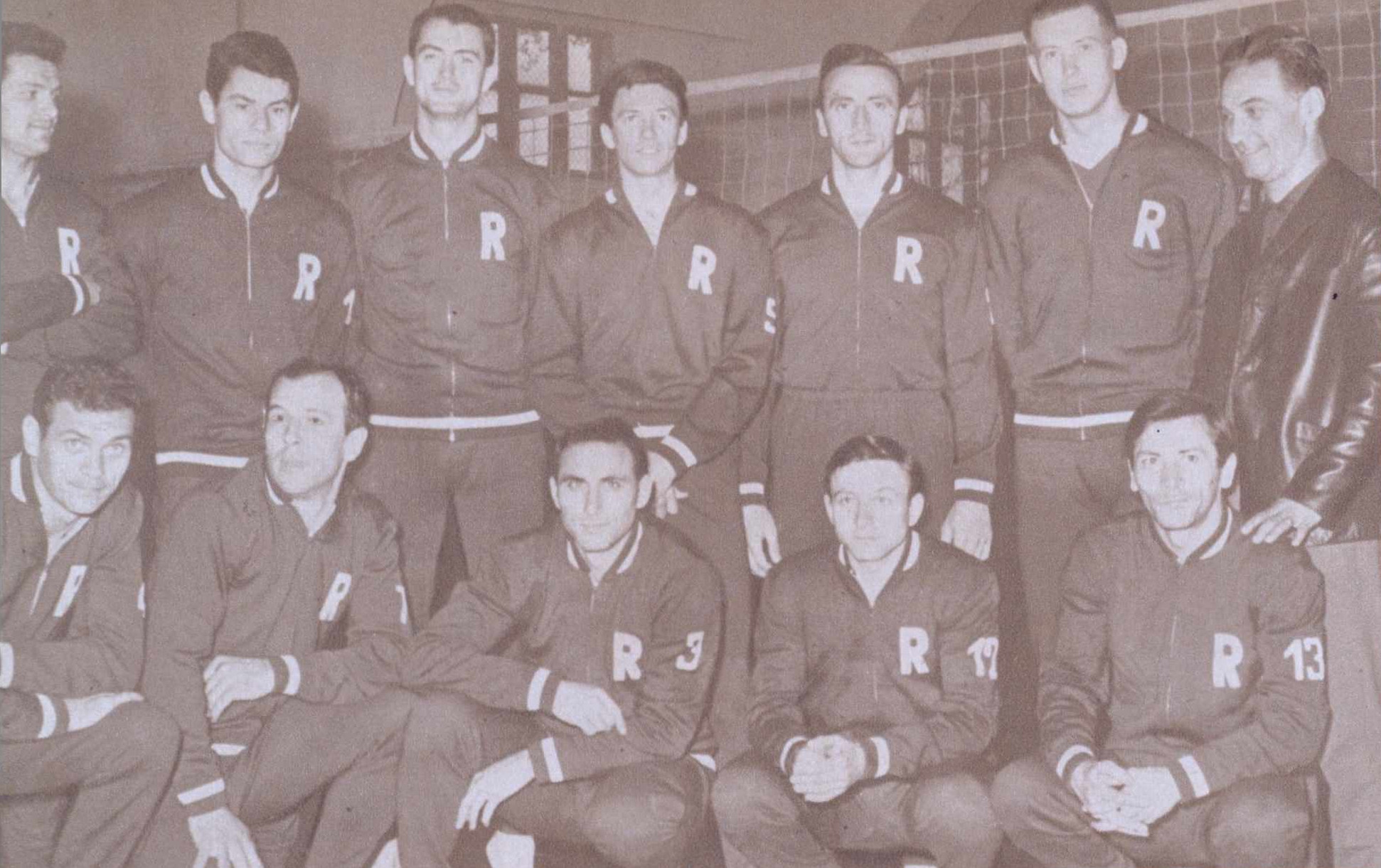
Rapid, champions of Romania in 1966

=== Domestic ===
- Divizia A1
  - Winners (11): 1948–49, 1949–50, 1954–55, 1955–56, 1958–59, 1959–60, 1960–61, 1961–62, 1962–63, 1964–65, 1965–66
- National Cup
  - Winners (1): 2023–24

=== International ===
- CEV Champions League:
  - Winners (3): 1960–61, 1962–63, 1964–65
  - Runners-up (4): 1959–60, 1961–62, 1965–66, 1966–67

Rapid, champions of Europe in 1963	Rapid, champions of Europe in 1965

== Women's Volleyball section ==
=== Domestic ===
- Divizia A1:
  - Winners (19): 1949–50, 1958–59, 1964–65, 1967–68, 1971–72, 1972–73, 1973–74, 1991–92, 1992–93, 1993–94, 1994–95, 1995–96, 1996–97, 1998–99, 1999–00, 2000–01, 2001–02, 2003–04, 2005–06

=== International ===
- CEF Challenge Cup
  - Third-place (1): 1989–90

== Men's Water polo section ==
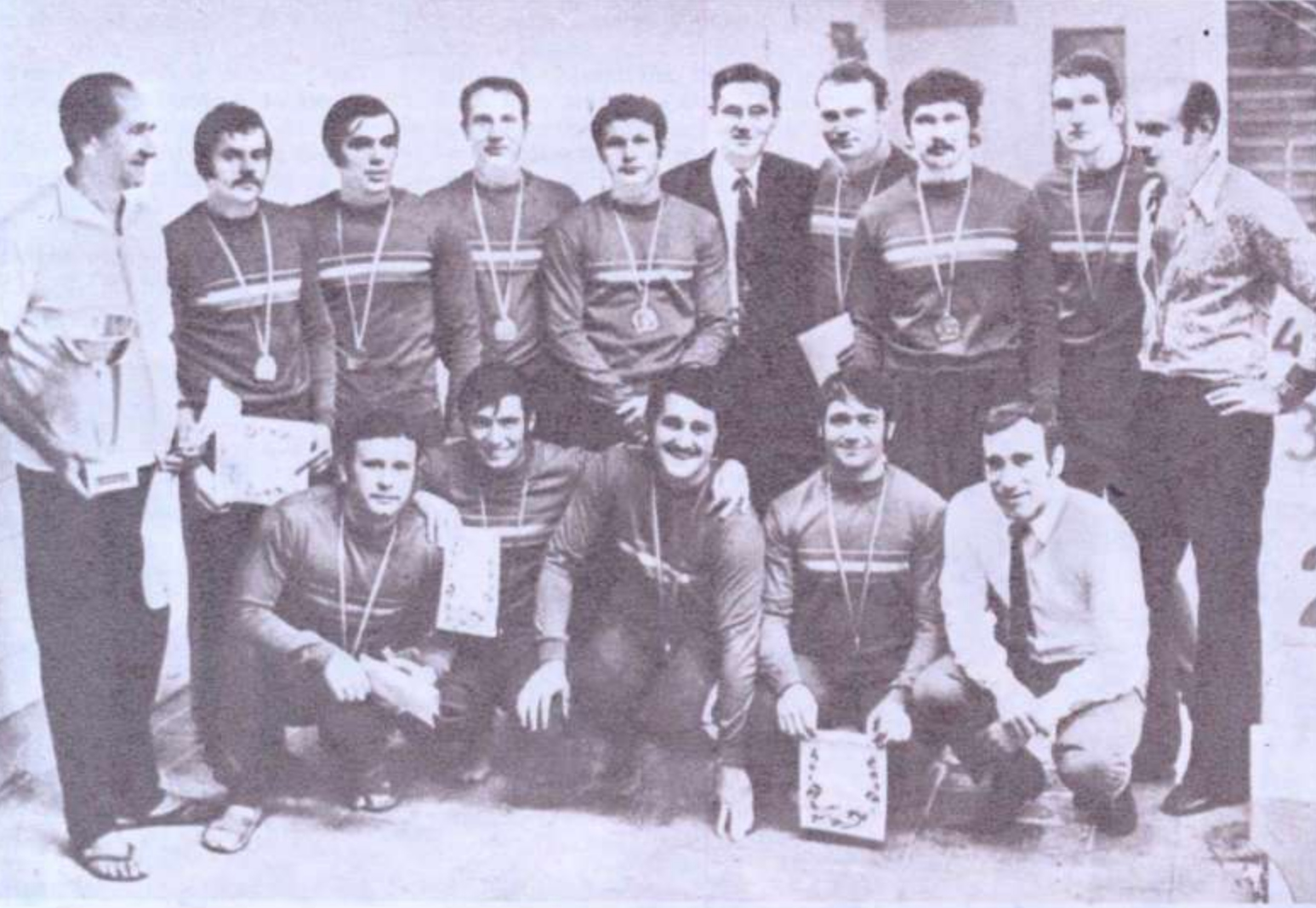
Rapid, champions of Romania in 1972

=== Domestic ===
- Romanian Superliga
  - Winners (13): 1933–34, 1934–35, 1939–40, 1942–43, 1971–72, 1974–75, 1975–76, 1976–77, 1980–81, 2000–01, 2001–02, 2002–03, 2003–04

== Women's Basketball section ==
=== Domestic ===
- Divizia A
  - Winners (9): 1950–51, 1951–52, 1959–60, 1960–61, 1961–62, 1964–65, 1968–69, 1971–72, 1977–78
- Cupa României
  - Winners (3): 1968–69, 1994–95, 2025–26

== Men's Basketball section ==
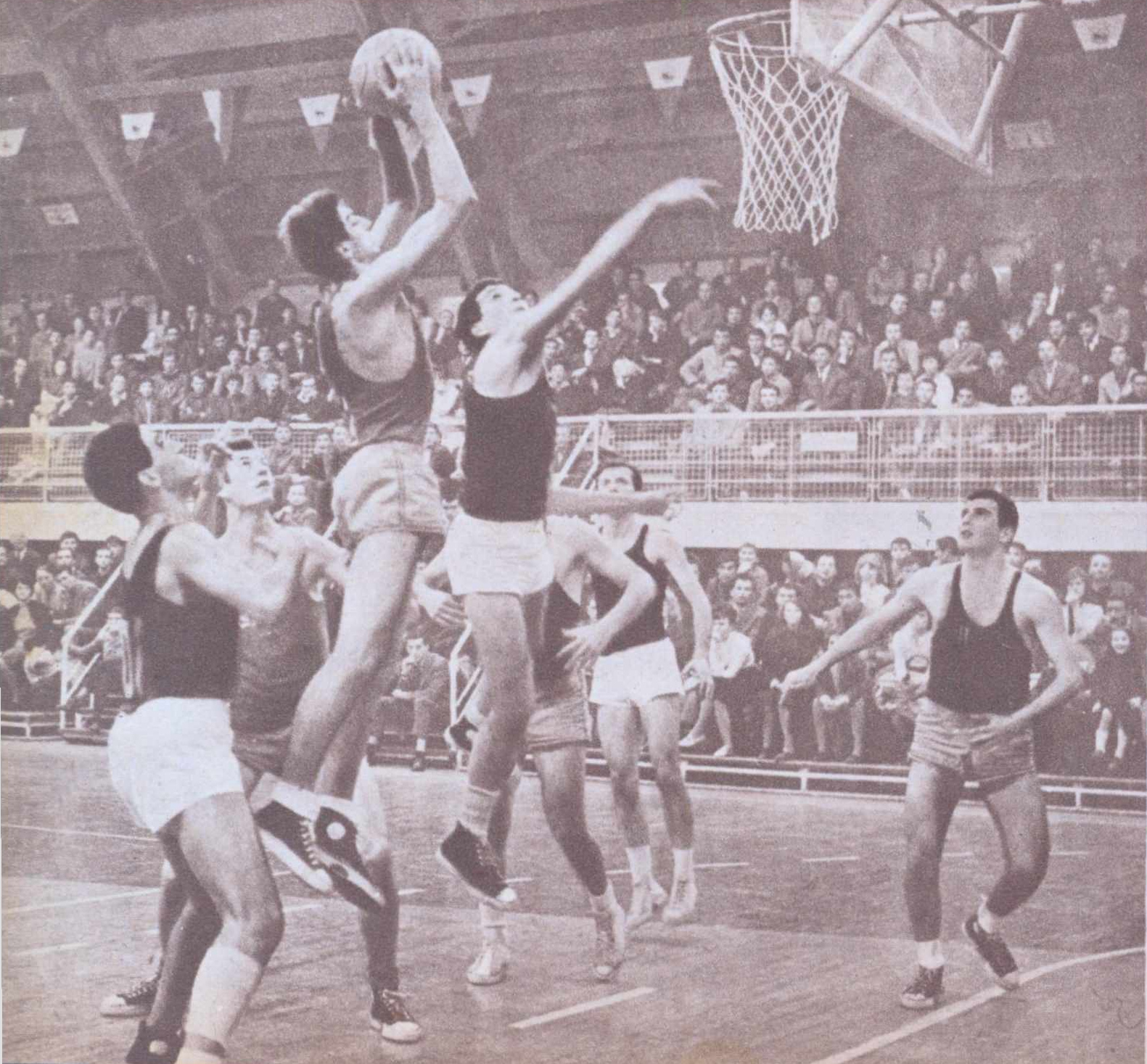
Rapid against rivals Steaua in 1965

=== Domestic ===
- Liga Națională
  - Winners (1): 1951
