= Nicolae Grigore =

Romanian footballer

Personal information
- Full name: Nicolae Adrian Grigore
- Date of birth: 19 July 1983 (age 43)
- Place of birth: Buftea, Romania
- Height: 1.83 m (6 ft 0 in)
- Position: Defensive midfielder

Youth career
- 1993–2001: Rapid București

Senior career*
Years	Team	Apps	(Gls)
2001–2009	Rapid București	116	(12)
2001	Electromagnetica București	15	(0)
2004	→ FC Brașov (loan)	11	(0)
2009–2010	FC Brașov	30	(1)
2010–2013	Rapid București	72	(11)
2013–2014	Al-Ettifaq	21	(5)
2014	Apollon Limassol	1	(0)
2015	Dinamo București	12	(0)
2015–2017	Voluntari	13	(0)
Total		291	(29)

International career
2003–2005	Romania U21	6	(0)
2009–2013	Romania	4	(0)

Managerial career
- 2018–2020: Rapid București U17
- 2018–2020: Rapid București (assistant)
- 2020: Romania U21 (assistant)
- 2020–2021: Rapid București
- 2021: FC U Craiova (assistant)
- 2021–2022: Metaloglobus București
- 2022–2023: Neftchi Baku (assistant)
- 2023–2024: Romania U16
- 2024–2025: Romania U17
- 2025–2026: Gloria Bistrița
- * Club domestic league appearances and goals

Nicolae Adrian Grigore (born 19 July 1983) is a Romanian professional football manager and former player.

== International career ==
Nicolae Grigore played four games at international level for Romania, making his debut on 14 October 2009 under coach Răzvan Lucescu in a 3–1 victory against Faroe Islands at the 2010 World Cup qualifiers. His following three games were friendlies which also ended up with victories, a 3–1 against Greece, a 1–0 against Switzerland and a 4–0 against Trinidad and Tobago.

== Career statistics ==
Appearances and goals by national team and year
National team	Year	Apps	Goals
Romania
Romania	2009	1	0
Romania	2010	0	0
Romania	2011	1	0
Romania	2012	1	0
Romania	2013	1	0
Total		4	0

== Honours ==
Rapid București

- Divizia A: 2002–03
- Cupa României: 2001–02, 2005–06, 2006–07
- Supercupa României: 2002, 2003, 2007
