= Nicolae Constantin =

Romanian footballer (born 1973)

Personal information
- Date of birth: 9 December 1973 (age 52)
- Place of birth: Filipeștii de Târg, Romania
- Height: 1.83 m (6 ft 0 in)
- Positions: Centre-back; striker

Team information
- Current team: Al Sadd (assistant)

Senior career*
Years	Team	Apps	(Gls)
1995–1996	Victoria Florești		
1996–1999	Petrolul Ploiești	69	(7)
1996–1997	→ Danubiana Ploiești (loan)	21	(6)
1999–2006	Rapid București	76	(7)
2001	Electromagnetica București	2	(0)
2002	→ Astra Ploiești (loan)	11	(1)
2004	→ Petrolul Ploiești (loan)	7	(0)
2007	Digenis Morphou	6	(0)
2007–2010	FC Brașov	54	(2)
2010–2011	Chimia Brazi		
2011	Metalul Filipești		
Total		246	(23)

Managerial career
- 2011–2012: Sportul Studențesc (assistant)
- 2012–2013: Târgu Mureș (assistant)
- 2014: Petrolul Ploiești (assistant)
- 2016: Petrolul Ploiești (assistant)
- 2017–2018: Romania U21 (assistant)
- 2018–2019: Al-Hazem (assistant)
- 2020: Filiași
- 2020: Comuna Recea
- 2021–2023: Petrolul Ploiești
- 2023–2026: PAOK (assistant)
- 2026–: Al Sadd (assistant)
- * Club domestic league appearances and goals

Nicolae "Nae" Constantin (born 9 December 1973) is a Romanian football manager and former player, who serves as an assistant for Qatar Stars League club Al Sadd.

== Playing career ==
Constantin started his playing career with Victoria Florești, a local club in from his native Prahova County. After one season, he moved to Petrolul Ploiești. In spite of being a central defender, he would often go up front and score goals for his teams, as he proved so while on loan at Danubiana Ploiești, where he totalled six goals from 21 games. Upon his return to Petrolul, he managed seven goals in 69 matches, before moving to rival Rapid București in 1999.

Constantin was loaned out during his first years in Bucharest to former clubs Danubiana—renamed Astra—and Petrolul, but became a notable figure in his later years at Rapid. Following Răzvan Lucescu's resignation at Rapid, he joined Cypriot side Digenis Akritas Morphou. Constantin only made seven appearances for Digenis, as he quickly returned to his home country to rejoin Lucescu and other Rapid players at FC Brașov.

Reunited with his former coach and teammates, Constantin spent three seasons with "the Yellow-Blacks", before joining third division club Chimia Brazi in 2010. At the end of the season, Chimia missed out a promotion to the Liga II by only two points.

== Managerial career ==
After retiring as a player, Constantin took up several positions as an assistant coach; notably, he collaborated with Răzvan Lucescu at Petrolul Ploiești in 2014 until the dismissal of the former, and between 2017 and 2019 assisted Daniel Isăilă during spells with the Romania under-21 national team and Saudi Arabian team Al-Hazem.

Constantin's first contracts as a head coach came in 2020 at Filiași and Comuna Recea, in the third and second divisions, respectively. In the summer of 2021, he returned to Petrolul as a head coach, which he stated it was one of his biggest wishes, and earned it promotion to the top flight after finishing the 2021–22 Liga II season in the first place.

== Honours ==
=== Player ===
Rapid București

- Divizia A: 2002–03
- Cupa României: 2005–06
- Supercupa României: 1999, 2002, 2003

FC Brașov

- Liga II: 2007–08

=== Coach ===
Petrolul Ploiești

- Liga II: 2021–22
