= Marius Măldărășanu =

Romanian footballer and manager

Personal information
- Full name: Constantin Marius Măldărășanu
- Date of birth: 19 April 1975 (age 51)
- Place of birth: Ploieşti, Romania
- Height: 1.81 m (5 ft 11 in)
- Position: Centre midfielder

Youth career
- 1991–1993: Feroemail Ploiești
- 1993–1996: Petrolul Teleajen

Senior career*
Years	Team	Apps	(Gls)
1996–1998	Petrolul Ploiești	47	(6)
1998–2007	Rapid București	238	(28)
2003	→ Beşiktaş (loan)	3	(0)
2008–2010	FC Brașov	52	(4)
Total		340	(38)

International career
2000–2006	Romania	9	(0)

Managerial career
- 2016–2018: Astra II Giurgiu
- 2018: Astra Giurgiu
- 2019–2020: Metaloglobus București
- 2021–2025: Hermannstadt
- * Club domestic league appearances and goals

Constantin Marius Măldărășanu (born 19 April 1975) is a Romanian football manager and former player.

== Club career ==
Măldărășanu started his career playing for Petrolul Ploieşti in 1996, moving to Rapid București in 1998. Măldărăşanu joined Turkish side Beşiktaş during the 2002 season, only to return in 2003. In January 2008, after a conflict with coach Mircea Rednic, Măldărăşanu was released from his contract. Soon after he signed a contract with FC Brașov.

== International career ==
Marius Măldărăşanu has been capped 8 times for Romania, making his debut under coach Emerich Jenei on 2 February 2000, in a friendly which ended with a 2–0 victory against Latvia. He also played in a 2006 World Cup qualification match against Armenia which ended 1–1. Măldărăşanu's last appearance for the national team was on 15 November 2006 in Cádiz in a friendly against Spain which ended with a 1–0 victory.

== Playing statistics ==
Appearances and goals by national team and year
National team	Year	Apps	Goals
Romania	2000	6	0
Romania	2001	1	0
Romania	2002	0	0
Romania	2003	0	0
Romania	2004	1	0
Romania	2005	0	0
Romania	2006	1	0
Total		9	0

== Managerial statistics ==
As of 9 November 2025

Team	From	To	Record							
Team	From	To	G	W	D	L	GF	GA	GD	Win %
(Romania) Astra II Giurgiu	4 January 2016	6 June 2018	52	40	5	7	106	49	+57	76.92
(Romania) Astra Giurgiu	7 June 2018	2 September 2018	7	2	5	0	8	4	+4	28.57
(Romania) Metaloglobus București	20 June 2019	31 May 2020	25	11	7	7	30	22	+8	44.00
(Romania) Hermannstadt	1 July 2021	2 December 2025	183	74	57	52	248	189	+59	40.44
Total			267	127	74	66	392	264	+128	47.57

== Honours ==
=== Player ===
Rapid București

- Divizia A: 1998–99, 2002–03
- Cupa României: 2001–02, 2005–06, 2006–07
- Supercupa României: 1999, 2002, 2003, 2007

Beşiktaş

- Süper Lig: 2002–03

FC Braşov

- Liga II: 2007–08

=== Coach ===
Hermannstadt

- Cupa României runner-up: 2024–25

Individual

- Gazeta Sporturilor Romania Coach of the Month: September 2022
