= Vasile Maftei =

Romanian retired footballer (born 1981)

Personal information
- Date of birth: 1 January 1981 (age 45)
- Place of birth: Fălticeni, Romania
- Height: 1.80 m (5 ft 11 in)
- Position: Defender

Team information
- Current team: Rapid București (youth center director)

Youth career
- 1988–1996: CSȘ Fălticeni
- 1996–1999: Sporting Pitești
- 1999–2000: Rapid București

Senior career*
Years	Team	Apps	(Gls)
2000–2009	Rapid București	211	(9)
2000	→ Tractorul Brașov (loan)	6	(1)
2009–2010	Unirea Urziceni	45	(3)
2011–2014	CFR Cluj	62	(7)
2014–2015	Concordia Chiajna	25	(3)
2015–2017	Voluntari	66	(1)
2017–2018	Rapid București	22	(2)
Total		437	(26)

International career
2000–2003	Romania U21	10	(0)
2006–2011	Romania	12	(1)

Managerial career
- 2019–2020: Astra Giurgiu (assistant)
- 2020–2021: Voluntari (assistant)
- 2021–: Rapid București (youth center director)
- * Club domestic league appearances and goals

Vasile Maftei (born 1 January 1981) is a former Romanian professional footballer who played as a defender, currently youth center director at Liga I club Rapid București.

He was best known for his leadership qualities, becoming captain for Rapid București, Unirea Urziceni, Concordia Chiajna and Voluntari. Although primarily a central defender, when needed he operated as a right back.

== Club career ==
Maftei was formed at Rapid București, where he became a key part of the team, winning one league title in 2003, one Romanian Cup and one Super Cup in 2002. In 2004, following the departure of Adrian Iencsi, he was appointed captain and won two Romanian Cups in a row in 2006 and 2007 and one Super Cup in 2007. He also reached the UEFA Cup quarter-finals with Rapid in 2006, where they were eliminated by Steaua București.

== International career ==
On 26 February 2006, Maftei was called up to the Romania team for the first time, as a replacement for the injured Dorin Goian. Two days later, he scored on his Romania debut against Armenia from a header, in a 2–0 win for his country. Overall, he managed 12 caps for Romania.

== Career statistics ==
=== Club ===
Club	Season	League		Cup		League Cup		Europe		Other		Total	
Club	Season	Apps	Goals	Apps	Goals	Apps	Goals	Apps	Goals	Apps	Goals	Apps	Goals
Tractorul Brașov (loan)	2000–01	6	1	?	?	-		-		-		6	1
Rapid București	2000–01	8	0	?	?	-		-		-		8	0
Rapid București	2001–02	5	0	?	?	-		-		-		9	0
Rapid București	2002–03	29	3	2	0	-		4	0	1	0	36	3
Rapid București	2003–04	25	0	2	0	-		2	0	0	0	29	0
Rapid București	2004–05	25	1	1	0	-		-		-		26	1
Rapid București	2005–06	29	1	5	0	-		13	0	-		47	1
Rapid București	2006–07	28	1	4	0	-		10	0	-		42	1
Rapid București	2007–08	33	2	2	0	-		2	0	1	0	38	2
Rapid București	2008–09	29	1	1	0	-		2	1	-		32	2
Rapid București	Total	211	9	17	0	-	-	33	1	2	0	263	10
Unirea Urziceni	2009–10	30	1	1	0	-		7	0	1	0	39	1
Unirea Urziceni	2010–11	15	2	1	0	-		4	0	1	0	21	2
Unirea Urziceni	Total	45	3	2	0	-	-	11	0	2	0	60	3
CFR Cluj	2010–11	3	0	-		-		-		-		3	0
CFR Cluj	2011–12	15	2	0	0	-		-		-		15	2
CFR Cluj	2012–13	20	2	4	0	-		2	0	1	0	27	2
CFR Cluj	2013–14	24	3	1	0	-		-		-		25	3
CFR Cluj	Total	62	7	5	0	-	-	2	0	1	0	70	7
Concordia Chiajna	2014–15	25	3	0	0	1	0	-		-		26	3
Voluntari	2015–16	29	1	0	0	1	0	-		2	0	32	1
Voluntari	2016–17	28	0	6	0	0	0	-		-		34	0
Voluntari	2017–18	9	0	0	0	0	0	-		1	0	10	0
Voluntari	Total	66	1	6	0	1	0	-	-	3	0	76	1
Rapid București	2017–18	22	2	?	?	-		-		-		22	2
Career Total		437	26	30	0	2	0	46	1	8	0	523	27

=== International ===
Appearances and goals by national team and year
National team	Year	Apps	Goals
Romania	2006	4	1
Romania	2007	1	0
Romania	2008	0	0
Romania	2009	3	0
Romania	2010	3	0
Romania	2011	1	0
Romania	Total	12	1

#	Date	Venue	Opponent	Score	Result	Competition
1	28 February 2006	GSP Stadium, Nicosia, Cyprus	Armenia	1-0	2–0	Friendly

== Honours ==
=== Club ===
Rapid București

- Divizia A: 2002–03
- Cupa României: 2001–02, 2005–06, 2006–07
- Supercupa României: 2002, 2003, 2007
- Liga IV – Bucharest: 2017–18

Unirea Urziceni

- Supercupa României runner-up: 2009, 2010

CFR Cluj

- Liga I: 2011–12
- Cupa României runner-up: 2012–13
- Supercupa României runner-up: 2012

Voluntari

- Cupa României: 2016–17
- Supercupa României: 2017
