= Daniel Niculae =

Romanian footballer

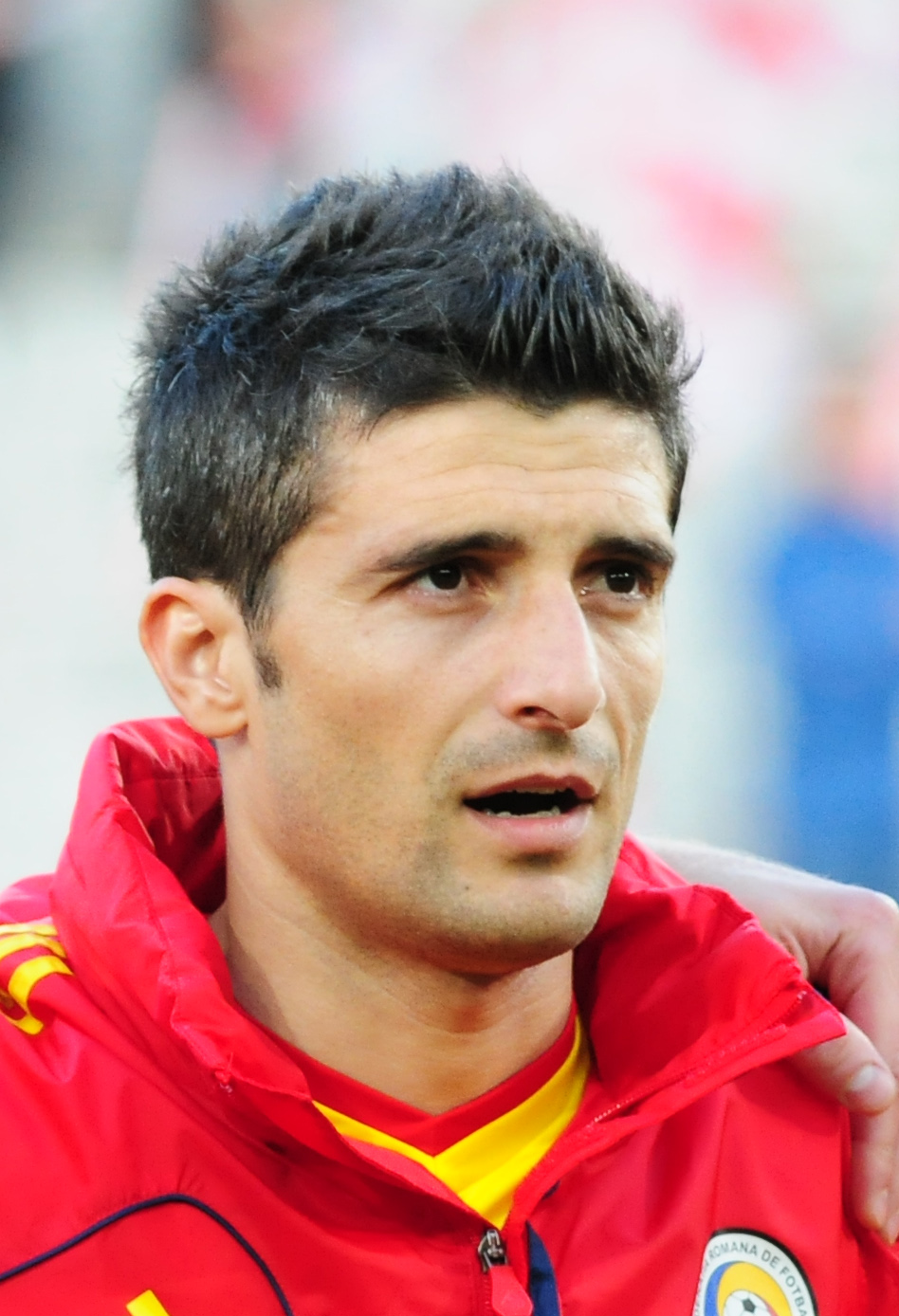
- Niculae with Romania in 2012

Personal information
- Full name: Daniel George Niculae
- Date of birth: 6 October 1982 (age 44)
- Place of birth: Bucharest, Romania
- Height: 1.85 m (6 ft 1 in)
- Position: Forward

Youth career
- 1992–1995: Dinamo București
- 1996–2001: Rapid București

Senior career*
Years	Team	Apps	(Gls)
2001–2006	Rapid București	107	(33)
2001	Electromagnetica București	7	(0)
2006–2010	Auxerre	130	(19)
2010–2012	Monaco	17	(4)
2011–2012	→ Nancy (loan)	31	(6)
2012–2013	Kuban Krasnodar	11	(2)
2014	Rapid București	15	(7)
2015	Rapid București	14	(3)
2015–2017	Astra Giurgiu	41	(8)
2017–2018	Rapid București	31	(40)
Total		404	(122)

International career
2002–2003	Romania U21	4	(0)
2003–2012	Romania	39	(9)

Managerial career
- 2021–2024: Rapid București (president)
- 2024–2026: Hermannstadt (president)
- * Club domestic league appearances and goals

Daniel George Niculae (Romanian pronunciation: [daniˈel ˈdʒe̯ordʒe nikuˈla.e]; born 6 October 1982) is a former Romanian professional footballer who played mainly as a striker.

He has made 39 appearances for Romania since his debut in 2003.

== Club career ==
=== Rapid București ===
Daniel Niculae started his professional career at Rapid București in 2000. Despite a period playing for the B team in 2001, Nico proved he is one of the most gifted players of the club, and helped his club to win the championship in the 2002–03 season – his first as a first-team regular.

Niculae was Rapid's leading scorer in the 2004–05 season, with 14 goals – the third highest total in Romania's Liga 1.

In the 2005–06 UEFA Cup campaign, he and Mugurel Buga formed one of the most powerful striker pairs of the competition, with Niculae scoring 8 goals, as Rapid reached the Quarter-Finals of the competition. The season also saw Rapid claim the 2006 Romanian Cup, with Niculae scoring the winning goal in the first minute of extra-time, against Național București.

=== Auxerre ===
Niculae was transferred to French club AJ Auxerre in the summer of 2006, for €3.3 million. His first season with the club saw him score 4 goals in the UEFA Cup, but he struggled for goals in Ligue 1. However, the following season his form improved, as he scored 11 goals to help keep the club in Ligue 1.

The 2008–09 season was one to forget for Niculae. He was deeply affected by the loss of his father, and despite threatening to score on several occasions, he failed to find the net in 32 games.

Things got back on track in 2009–10 however. Jean Fernandez initially wanted to loan out Niculae for the season, but the latest signing Alexandre Licata was ruled out for most of the season with a serious ankle injury. Daniel Niculae found a new role in the Auxerre side, as a creator of goals rather than a scorer of them. As of April 2010, he lies third in the table for assists in Ligue 1 with a total of 8. He has a brilliant entente with Polish goalscorer Ireneusz Jeleń and has helped the Burgundian side to reach second in the table and to thus push for the Champions League places.

=== Monaco ===
After the expiration of his contract with AJ Auxerre on 15 June 2010, Niculae signed a three-year deal with Ligue 1 rivals AS Monaco.

On 31 August 2011, Niculae signed for French side AS Nancy on a season-long loan. In a game against his former club, AJ Auxerre, on 30 January 2012, Nicuale scored a double giving his team the win. Although, before the game started, Auxerre's supporters booed him, at the end he got a standing ovation for his impressive performance.

=== Kuban Krasnodar ===
On 6 June 2012, he joined the Russian club Kuban Krasnodar, on a two-year contract. Here he will be coached by Yuri Krasnozhan.

== International career ==
Niculae won his first international cap for Romania in 2003, but did not become a regular squad member until the 2005–06 season.

He was selected for Romania's Euro 2008 squad, and started his country's first two matches. He came on as a substitute for their final group game against the Netherlands, but could not help Romania to a win, which would have taken the country into the Quarter-Finals.

Other than the fact that they share birthplace, he has no connection with namesake and fellow international Marius Niculae.

== Career statistics ==
=== Club ===
Appearances and goals by club, season and competition
Club	Season	League			National cup (Note: Includes Cupa României, Coupe de France, Russian Cup)		League cup (Note: Includes Cupa României, Coupe de la Ligue)		Europe		Other		Total	
Club	Season	Division	Apps	Goals	Apps	Goals	Apps	Goals	Apps	Goals	Apps	Goals	Apps	Goals
Rapid București	2000–01	Divizia A	1	0	–		–		–		–		1	0
Rapid București	2001–02	Divizia A	4	1	0	0	–		0	0	–		4	1
Rapid București	2002–03	Divizia A	29	6	1	0	–		4 (Note: Appearances in UEFA Cup)	0	1 (Note: Appearance in Supercupa României)	0	35	6
Rapid București	2003–04	Divizia A	24	4	2	0	–		2 (Note: Appearances in UEFA Champions League)	0	1	0	29	4
Rapid București	2004–05	Divizia A	20	14	0	0	–		–		–		20	14
Rapid București	2005–06	Divizia A	29	8	6	3	–		14	8	–		49	19
Rapid București	Total		107	33	9	3	0	0	20	8	2	0	138	44
Electromagnetica București	2001–02	Divizia B	7	0	–		–		–		–		7	0
Auxerre	2006–07	Ligue 1	30	4	0	0	2	0	10 (Note: Two appearances in UEFA Intertoto Cup, eight appearances and four goals in UEFA Cup)	4	–		42	8
Auxerre	2007–08	Ligue 1	35	11	2	1	4	0	–		–		41	12
Auxerre	2008–09	Ligue 1	32	0	1	0	2	0	–		–		35	0
Auxerre	2009–10	Ligue 1	33	4	4	0	1	0	–		–		38	4
Auxerre	Total		130	19	7	1	9	0	10	4	0	0	156	24
Monaco	2010–11	Ligue 1	17	4	1	0	1	0	–		–		19	4
Monaco	2011–12	Ligue 2	0	0	–		1	0	–		–		1	0
Monaco	Total		17	4	1	0	2	0	0	0	0	0	20	4
Nancy (loan)	2011–12	Ligue 1	31	6	0	0	0	0	–		–		31	6
Kuban Krasnodar	2012–13	Russian Premier League	11	2	2	0	–		–		–		13	2
Rapid București	2013–14	Liga II	15	7	–		–		–		–		15	7
Rapid București	2014–15	Liga I	14	3	–		–		–		–		14	3
Astra Giurgiu	2015–16	Liga I	19	2	1	0	1	0	–		–		21	1
Astra Giurgiu	2016–17	Liga I	22	6	2	1	0	0	10 (Note: Two appearances in UEFA Champions League, eight appearances in UEFA Europa League)	0	0	0	0	0
Astra Giurgiu	Total		41	8	3	1	1	0	10	0	0	0	55	9
Rapid București	2017–18	Liga IV	31	40	–		–		–		–		31	40
Career total			404	122	22	5	12	0	40	12	2	0	480	139

=== International ===
Appearances and goals by national team and year
National team	Year	Apps	Goals
Romania	2003	1	0
Romania	2004	1	0
Romania	2005	4	1
Romania	2006	7	1
Romania	2007	7	2
Romania	2008	6	1
Romania	2009	1	1
Romania	2010	8	2
Romania	2011	1	1
Romania	2012	3	0
Total		39	9

Scores and results list Romania's goal tally first, score column indicates score after each Niculae goal.

List of international goals scored by Daniel Niculae
No.	Date	Venue	Opponent	Score	Result	Competition
1	16 November 2005	Stadionul Steaua, Bucharest, Romania	Nigeria	1–0	3–0	Friendly
2	26 May 2006	Soldier Field, Chicago, United States	Northern Ireland	2–0	2–0	Friendly
3	21 November 2007	Stadionul Lia Manoliu, Bucharest, Romania	Albania	3–0	6–1	UEFA Euro 2008 qualifying
4	21 November 2007	Stadionul Lia Manoliu, Bucharest, Romania	Albania	4–0	6–1	UEFA Euro 2008 qualifying
5	26 March 2008	Stadionul Steaua, Bucharest, Romania	Russia	2–0	3–0	Friendly
6	14 November 2009	Stadion Wojska Polskiego, Warsaw, Poland	Poland	1–0	1–0	Friendly
7	29 May 2010	Ukraina Stadium, Lviv, Ukraine	Ukraine	2–1	2–3	Friendly
8	5 June 2010	Jacques Lemans Arena, Sankt Veit an der Glan, Carinthia, Austria	Honduras	1–0	3–0	Friendly
9	11 November 2011	Stade Maurice Dufrasne, Liège, Belgium	Belgium	1–2	1–2	Friendly

== Honours ==
Rapid București

- Divizia A: 2002–03
- Cupa României: 2001–02, 2005–06
- Supercupa României: 2002, 2003
- Liga IV – Bucharest: 2017–18

Auxerre

- UEFA Intertoto Cup: 2006

Astra Giurgiu

- Liga I: 2015–16
- Cupa României runner-up: 2016–17
- Supercupa României: 2016
