= Dănuț Perjă =

Romanian footballer

Dănuţ Perjă
Personal information
- Date of birth: 14 November 1974 (age 51)
- Place of birth: Verești, Romania
- Height: 1.82 m (5 ft 11 1/2 in)
- Position: Defender

Youth career
- –1993: Bucovina Suceava

Senior career*
Years	Team	Apps	(Gls)
1993–1996	Bucovina Suceava	58	(3)
1996–2001	Ceahlăul Piatra Neamț	110	(11)
2000	→ Beitar Jerusalem (loan)	26	(0)
2001–2009	Rapid București	135	(5)
Total		329	(19)

Managerial career
- 2011–2016: Rapid București (team manager)
- 2016–2017: Foresta Suceava (sporting director)
- 2018–2019: Energeticianul (president)
- 2019–2026: Hermannstadt (team manager)
- * Club domestic league appearances and goals

Dănuţ Perjă (born 14 November 1974) is a former Romanian professional football player who played as a defender.

== Career ==
Perjă won three Romanian Cup and two Romanian Super Cup finals as a FC Rapid București player. After he retired from playing, he became a manager leading Rapid and FC Hermannstadt in Liga I.

== Honours ==
Rapid București

- Divizia A: 2002–03
- Cupa României: 2001–02, 2005–06, 2006–07
- Supercupa României: 2002, 2003, 2007
