= Ionuț Rada (footballer, born 1982) =

Romanian footballer (born 1982)

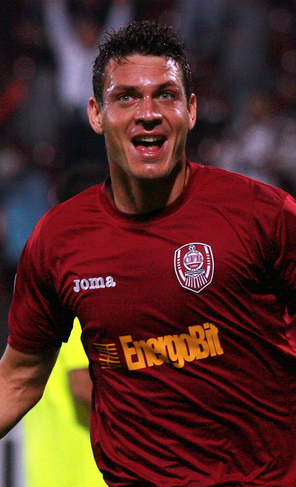
- Rada with CFR Cluj in 2010

Personal information
- Full name: Ionuț Alin Rada
- Date of birth: 6 July 1982 (age 44)
- Place of birth: Craiova, Romania
- Height: 1.90 m (6 ft 3 in)
- Position: Defender

Youth career
- CSS Craiova
- Școala de Fotbal Gheorghe Popescu
- FC Universitatea Craiova

Senior career*
Years	Team	Apps	(Gls)
2000–2004	FC Universitatea Craiova	46	(1)
2001	→ Rocar București (loan)	13	(0)
2004–2007	Rapid București	65	(3)
2005	→ Național București (loan)	14	(2)
2007–2010	Steaua București	32	(1)
2009–2010	→ Otopeni (loan)	13	(0)
2010	Al-Nasr	4	(0)
2010–2015	CFR Cluj	78	(4)
2012	→ Karlsruher SC (loan)	15	(1)
2015–2016	Bari	26	(2)
2016–2018	Fidelis Andria	54	(2)
2018–2020	Sănătatea Cluj		
Total		360	(16)

International career
2000	Romania U18	7	(0)
2000	Romania U19	8	(0)
2001–2003	Romania U21	9	(0)
2004	Romania B	2	(0)
2003–2004	Romania	2	(0)
- * Club domestic league appearances and goals

Ionuț Alin Rada (born 6 July 1982) is a Romanian former professional footballer who played as a centre-back or a left-back.

After starting out with hometown club FC Universitatea Craiova, Rada played for București - Ilfov sides Rocar, Rapid, Național, Steaua and Otopeni until 2010, when he moved abroad for the first time with a brief stint at Al-Nasr. He returned to Romania the same year to sign for CFR Cluj, and also represented Karlsruher SC, Bari, Fidelis Andria and Sănătatea Cluj before retiring in 2020.

Internationally, Rada earned two caps for Romania's national team between 2003 and 2004.

== Club career ==
=== Early career ===
Rada was born on 6 July 1982 in Craiova, Romania. He began playing junior-level football at CSS Craiova, then moving to Gheorghe Popescu's football school. Subsequently, Rada joined FC Universitatea Craiova where he made his Divizia A debut on 17 March 2001 under coach Ilie Balaci in a 4–2 away loss to Gloria Bistrița. In the first half of the 2001–02 season, he was loaned to Divizia B side Rocar București, returning afterwards to "U" Craiova. He made his European competitions debut by playing four matches in the 2001 Intertoto Cup. Rada scored his first league goal in a 3–1 home win over Astra Ploiești. In early 2004, Rapid București transferred him and Ionuț Stancu, paying €500,000 to Universitatea, of which €400,000 was for Rada.

=== Rapid București and Național București ===
His limited playing time in his first year at Rapid resulted in a half-year loan to Național București in 2005. There, he scored two goals in a 1–0 victory against Steaua București and in a 2–1 win over FCM Bacău.

Afterwards, Rada returned to The Railwaymen, playing 15 matches in their 2005–06 UEFA Cup campaign, where they defeated Feyenoord with 2–1 on aggregate and reached the group stage. There, they finished first in a group composed of Shakhtar Donetsk, VfB Stuttgart, PAOK and Rennes. Subsequently, they advanced past Hertha Berlin and Hamburg, reaching the quarter-finals where they were eliminated by rivals Steaua on the away goal rule after 1–1 on aggregate. The team finished the season by winning the 2005–06 Cupa României, with Rada playing the entire match under coach Răzvan Lucescu in the 1–0 extra-time win against his former side, Național, in the final.

Rada netted a goal that helped Rapid eliminate Nacional and reach the 2006–07 UEFA Cup group stage, where he made four appearances. He ended the season by winning another Cupa României, with coach Lucescu using him the full 90 minutes in the 2–0 victory against Politehnica Timișoara in the final.

=== Steaua București, Otopeni and Al-Nasr ===
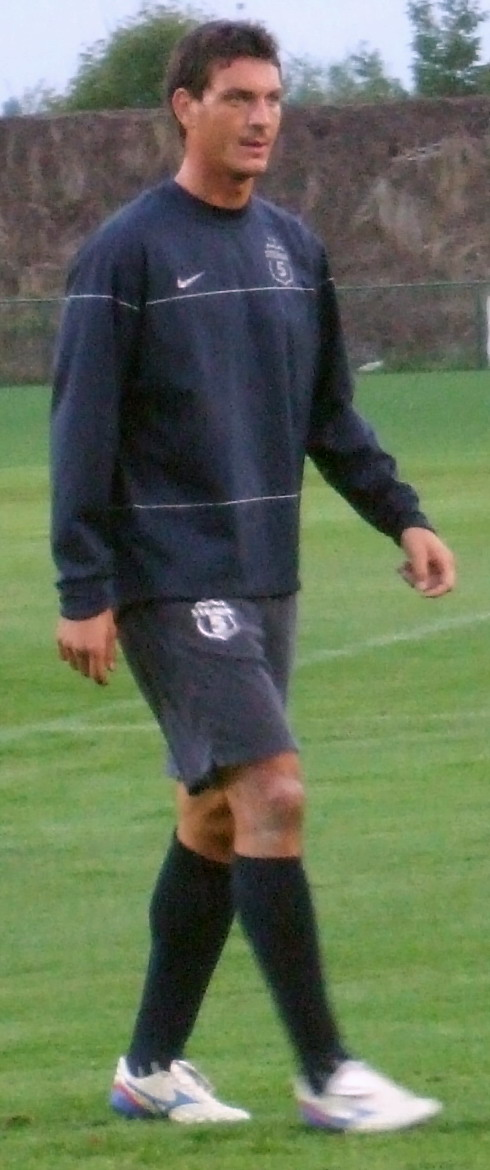
Rada training for Steaua București in 2008

On 25 July 2007, Rada signed with Steaua București, which paid €1.6 million to Rapid. He was wanted there by Gheorghe Hagi as a replacement for injured Sorin Ghionea. Rada helped them eliminate Zagłębie Lubin and BATE Borisov in the Champions League qualifying rounds, reaching the group stage. There, he played in all six matches facing Arsenal, Sevilla and Slavia Prague, but earned only one draw against the latter, losing the other matches. He scored his only goal for Steaua in September 2007 in a 1–0 league victory over FC Vaslui with a header, following a corner kick executed by Bănel Nicoliță.

In February 2009, Rada was loaned, at his request, to CS Otopeni for half a year. Subsequently, he returned to The Military Men, playing six games in the 2009–10 Europa League group stage.

On 28 December 2009, Steaua announced that Rada was sold to Al-Nasr for €300,000. However, he made only four league appearances there.

=== CFR Cluj and Karlsruher SC ===
On 11 June 2010, Rada signed with CFR Cluj. He played six matches in the 2010–11 Champions League group stage, scoring two goals, one in a win over Basel and another in a loss to AS Roma. In the first half of the 2011–12 season, he made four league appearances under coach Jorge Costa. However, he was loaned for the second half of the season to 2. Bundesliga side Karlsruher SC, but CFR still managed to win the title without him.

After his loan in Germany ended, Rada returned to CFR at the request of coach Ioan Andone. He played nine games in the team's 2012–13 Champions League campaign as they got past Slovan Liberec and Basel in the qualifying rounds, then earned 10 points in a group composed of Manchester United, Galatasaray and Braga, which helped them finish third. Subsequently, they qualified for the round of 32 in the Europa League, where he featured in both legs of their defeat to Inter Milan. On 7 December 2014, Rada made his last Liga I appearance in CFR's 0–0 draw against CS Universitatea Craiova, totaling 246 matches with 11 goals in the competition and 64 matches with three goals in European competitions (including four appearances in the Intertoto Cup).

=== Late career ===
On 19 January 2015, Rada signed a contract with Serie B outfit Bari. In August 2016, he joined Serie C side Fidelis Andria for a two-year spell. From 2018 to 2020, he played for Liga III team Sănătatea Cluj, retiring afterwards.

== International career ==
Between 2000 and 2004, Rada was consistently featured for Romania's under-18, under-19, under-21 and B sides.

Rada played two matches for Romania, making his debut on 20 August 2003 when coach Anghel Iordănescu sent him in the 88th minute to replace Răzvan Raț in a 2–0 friendly victory against Ukraine. His second appearance occurred on 18 February 2004 in a 3–0 win over Georgia during the Cyprus International Football Tournament.

== Writing ==
Rada wrote an autobiographical book titled Vreau să joc (I want to play), which was released on 29 June 2022. He was inspired to start writing by his former Al-Nasr teammate, Carlos Tenorio.

== Personal life ==
On 29 March 2006, Rada was decorated by the President of Romania, Traian Băsescu, with the Ordinul "Meritul Sportiv" (Order of "Sporting Merit"), Class II, for his contribution to reaching the 2005–06 UEFA Cup quarter-finals with Rapid București.

== Honours ==
Rapid București

- Cupa României: 2005–06, 2006–07

CFR Cluj

- Liga I: 2011–12
