= Jiul =

Jiul may refer to these places in Romania:

- the River Jiu (Jiu + -l)
  - Jiul de Vest
  - Jiul de Est
- A village in Țuglui Commune, Dolj County
