= Constantin Schumacher =

Romanian footballer (born 1976)

Personal information
- Date of birth: 8 May 1976 (age 50)
- Place of birth: Fălticeni, Romania
- Height: 1.70 m (5 ft 7 in)
- Position: Attacking midfielder

Team information
- Current team: SCM Râmnicu Vâlcea (head coach)

Youth career
- –1992: CSȘ Fălticeni

Senior career*
Years	Team	Apps	(Gls)
1992–1993	Foresta Fălticeni		
1993–1999	Argeș Pitești	147	(28)
1999–2003	Rapid București	77	(12)
2001	→ Gloria Bistrița (loan)	13	(4)
2003–2004	Chongqing Qiche	29	(0)
2004–2005	FC Universitatea Craiova	12	(2)
2005–2006	Volyn Lutsk	17	(1)
2006	Guangzhou Pharmaceutical	16	(4)
2007	Argeș Pitești	11	(1)
2007	Ceahlăul Piatra Neamț	14	(0)
2008–2009	Internațional Curtea de Argeș	8	(2)
2009	Anagennisi Giannitsa	12	(1)
Total		321	(52)

International career
2002	Romania	1	(0)

Managerial career
- 2010: Girom Albota
- 2011–2012: Juventus București
- 2012: CSM Râmnicu Vâlcea
- 2013: Oțelul II Galați
- 2013: Oțelul Galați (caretaker)
- 2013–2014: Oțelul Galați (assistant)
- 2014: Viitorul Constanța (assistant)
- 2015: Astra II Giurgiu
- 2015: SCM Pitești
- 2016: Petrolul Ploiești
- 2017–2018: Rapid București
- 2019: Atletic Bradu
- 2019: CS Universitatea Craiova (assistant)
- 2021–2022: Argeș II Pitești
- 2022–2023: Argeș Pitești (assistant)
- 2023–2024: Mioveni
- 2024: 1599 Șelimbăr
- 2025: Minaur Baia Mare
- 2025–: SCM Râmnicu Vâlcea
- * Club domestic league appearances and goals

Constantin Schumacher (born 8 May 1976) is a Romanian football manager and former midfielder, currently in charge of Liga II club SCM Râmnicu Vâlcea.

== Club career ==
Constantin Schumacher started his football career at CSȘ Fălticeni, a youth club in his neighbourhood. He signed in 1992 with Foresta Fălticeni but moved, after only a season, to another Divizia B team, more specifically FC Argeş Piteşti. At the end of the season, his team promoted and he played 5 seasons for Argeș in Liga 1.

In 2000, he joined Rapid București where he played four seasons, making 77 appearances for his team and scoring 12 goals. After his time as a player at Rapid Bucharest, he moved to China, signing with Chongqing Qiche. He played two years in China, before moving back to Romania, where he played at Universitatea Craiova.

At the end of the season, his team relegated and he moved to Ukraine at Volyn Lutsk. He played 17 games in Vyscha Liha, scoring a goal. He returned to Romania after only a season at FC Argeş Piteşti. At the end of 2006–2007 season, Argeș relegated and he moved at Ceahlăul Piatra Neamţ.

== International career ==
Schumacher has also one cap for Romania. He played against Croatia at Dan Păltinişanu, but after that game he was not called anymore.

== Honours ==
=== Player ===
Argeș Pitești

- Divizia B: 1993-94

Rapid București

- Divizia A: 2002-03
- Cupa României: 2001-02
- Supercupa României: 1999, 2002

=== Coach ===
Rapid București

- Liga IV – Bucharest: 2017-18
