= Lucescu =

Lucescu is a Romanian surname. Notable people with the surname include:

- Mircea Lucescu (1945–2026), Romanian footballer and coach
- Răzvan Lucescu (born 1969), Romanian footballer and coach, son of Mircea
