= 1999–2000 FC Extensiv Craiova season =

FC Extensiv Craiova
1999–2000 season
- Manager: Sorin Cârțu
- Divizia A: 18th (relegated)
- Cupa României: First round proper

The 1999–2000 FC Extensiv Craiova season was the club's 51st season in existence and the club's first season in the top flight of Romanian football. In addition to the domestic league, Extensiv Craiova participated in this season's edition of the Cupa României.

Extensiv Craiova finished 18th in the league table and were relegated after the season.

== Players ==
=== First-team squad ===
Note: Flags indicate national team as defined under FIFA eligibility rules; some limited exceptions apply. Players may hold more than one non-FIFA nationality.

No.	Pos.	Nation	Player
—	GK	ROU	Gheorghe Stoianov
—	GK	ROU	Valentin David
—	DF	ROU	Mirel Rădoi
—	DF	ROU	Valeriu Mieilă
—	DF	ROU	George Biţă
—	DF	ROU	Florinel Mirea
—	DF	ROU	Daniel Ghindeanu
—	DF	ROU	Florin Șoavă
—	DF	ROU	Mihai Panc

No.	Pos.	Nation	Player
—	MF	ROU	Dorin Rădoi
—	MF	ROU	Iosif Rotariu
—	FW	ROU	Mugur Gușatu
—	FW	ROU	Claudiu Raducanu
—	FW	ROU	Ștefan Stoica
—	FW	ROU	Florin Mihai Știrbulescu
—	FW	ROU	Florin Fabian

== Competitions ==
=== Overall record ===
Competition	First match	Last match	Starting round	Final position	Record							
Competition	First match	Last match	Starting round	Final position	Pld	W	D	L	GF	GA	GD	Win %
Divizia A	24 July 1999	10 May 2000	Matchday 1		34	4	5	25	26	66	−40	11.76
Cupa României	22 September 1999		First round proper	First round proper	1	0	0	1	1	4	−3	0.00
Total					35	4	5	26	27	70	−43	11.43

Source: Competitions

=== Divizia A ===
==== League table ====
Pos	Team	Pld	W	D	L	GF	GA	GD	Pts	Qualification or relegation
14	Brașov	34	14	4	16	53	43	+10	46 (Note: CRA 1–0 BRA; BRA 0–1 CRA)	
15	Farul Constanța (R)	34	12	8	14	38	45	−7	44	Relegation to Divizia B
16	FC Onești (R)	34	9	3	22	37	92	−55	30	Relegation to Divizia B
17	CSM Reșița (R)	34	5	8	21	35	73	−38	23	Relegation to Divizia B
18	Extensiv Craiova (R)	34	4	5	25	26	66	−40	17	Relegation to Divizia B

Source: LT (in Romanian)
Rules for classification: 1) points; 2) head-to-head points; 3) head-to-head goal difference; 4) head-to-head goals scored; 5) goal difference; 6) number of goals scored.
(R) Relegated

==== Results summary ====
Overall								Home						Away					
Pld	W	D	L	GF	GA	GD	Pts	W	D	L	GF	GA	GD	W	D	L	GF	GA	GD
34	4	5	25	26	66	−40	17	4	3	10	14	22	−8	0	2	15	12	44	−32

==== Results by round ====
Round	1	2	3	4	5	6	7	8	9	10	11	12	13	14	15	16	17	18	19	20	21	22	23	24	25	26	27	28	29	30	31	32	33	34
Ground	H	A	H	A	A	H	A	H	A	H	A	H	A	H	A	H	A	A	H	A	H	H	A	H	A	H	A	H	A	H	A	H	A	H
Result	W	L	L	L	L	W	L	L	L	D	L	W	L	L	L	D	L	L	W	L	L	D	L	L	L	L	L	L	D	L	D	L	L	L
Position	5	11	14	16	17	15	16	16	16	16	17	16	17	17	18	17	18	18	18	18	18	18	18	18	18	18	18	18	18	18	18	18	18	18

A = Away; H = Home; W = Win; D = Draw; L = Loss

==== Matches ====
24 July 1999 1	Extensiv Craiova	2–1	Argeș Pitești
--:-- EEST (UTC+3)

30 July 1999 2	Oţelul Galaţi	8–2	Extensiv Craiova
--:-- EEST (UTC+3)

4 August 1999 3	Extensiv Craiova	1–2	Gloria Bistrița
--:-- EEST (UTC+3)

8 August 1999 4	Dinamo Bucureşti	3–0	Extensiv Craiova
--:-- EEST (UTC+3)

14 August 1999 5	Petrolul Ploieşti	2–0	Extensiv Craiova
--:-- EEST (UTC+3)

21 August 1999 6	Extensiv Craiova	2–1	AS Rocar Bucuresti
--:-- EEST (UTC+3)

28 August 1999 7	FC Brașov	2–1	Extensiv Craiova
--:-- EEST (UTC+3)

11 September 1999 8	Extensiv Craiova	1–2	Rapid Bucureşti
--:-- EEST (UTC+3)

17 September 1999 9	National Bucureşti	2–0	Extensiv Craiova
--:-- EEST (UTC+3)

25 September 1999 10	Extensiv Craiova	0–0	FC Onești
--:-- EEST (UTC+3)

2 October 1999 11	Farul Constanța	1–0	Extensiv Craiova
--:-- EEST (UTC+3)

16 October 1999 12	Extensiv Craiova	1–0	CSM Reșița
--:-- EEST (UTC+3)

23 October 1999 13	FC Universitatea Craiova	3–0	Extensiv Craiova
--:-- EEST (UTC+3)

27 October 1999 14	Extensiv Craiova	0–1	Astra Ploieşti
--:-- EEST (UTC+3)

30 October 1999 15	FCM Bacău	1–0	Extensiv Craiova
--:-- EEST (UTC+3)

6 November 1999 16	Extensiv Craiova	0–0	Ceahlăul Piatra Neamt
--:-- EET (UTC+2)

13 November 1999 17	AFC Steaua București	5–2	Extensiv Craiova
--:-- EET (UTC+2)

20 November 1999 18	Argeș Pitești	2–0	Extensiv Craiova
--:-- EET (UTC+2)

27 November 1999 19	Extensiv Craiova	3–0	Oţelul Galaţi
--:-- EET (UTC+2)

4 December 1999 20	Gloria Bistrița	1–0	Extensiv Craiova
--:-- EET (UTC+2)

4 March 2000 21	Extensiv Craiova	0–1	Dinamo Bucureşti
--:-- EET (UTC+2)

11 March 2000 22	Extensiv Craiova	0–0	Petrolul Ploieşti
--:-- EET (UTC+2)

18 March 2000 23	AS Rocar Bucuresti	3–1	Extensiv Craiova
--:-- EET (UTC+2)

22 March 2000 24	Extensiv Craiova	0–1	FC Brașov
--:-- EET (UTC+2)

25 March 2000 25	Rapid Bucureşti	4–2	Extensiv Craiova
--:-- EET (UTC+2)

1 April 2000 26	Extensiv Craiova	1–2	National Bucureşti
--:-- EEST (UTC+3)

5 April 2000 27	FC Onești	3–2	Extensiv Craiova
--:-- EEST (UTC+3)

8 April 2000 28	Extensiv Craiova	1–3	Farul Constanța
--:-- EEST (UTC+3)

15 April 2000 29	CSM Reșița	0–0	Extensiv Craiova
--:-- EEST (UTC+3)

22 April 2000 30	Extensiv Craiova	2–3	FC Universitatea Craiova
--:-- EEST (UTC+3)

29 April 2000 31	Astra Ploieşti	1–1	Extensiv Craiova
--:-- EEST (UTC+3)

3 May 2000 32	Extensiv Craiova	0–2	FCM Bacău
--:-- EEST (UTC+3)

6 May 2000 33	Ceahlăul Piatra Neamt	3–1	Extensiv Craiova
--:-- EEST (UTC+3)

10 May 2000 34	Extensiv Craiova	0–3	AFC Steaua București
--:-- EEST (UTC+3)

=== Cupa României ===
22 September 1999 First round	Ceahlăul Piatra Neamț	4–1	Extensiv Craiova
--:-- EEST (UTC+3)
