= Constantin Romeo Stancu =

Romanian footballer

Personal information
- Date of birth: 11 May 1978 (age 48)
- Place of birth: Slatina, Romania
- Height: 1.81 m (5 ft 11 in)
- Position: Midfielder

Senior career*
Years	Team	Apps	(Gls)
1996–1997	Universitatea Craiova	1	(0)
1998–2000	Rocar București	23	(2)
2000–2005	Politehnica Timişoara	110	(17)
2005–2008	Rapid București	30	(1)
2008–2009	Oțelul Galați	9	(0)
2009–2010	Unirea Alba Iulia	3	(0)
2010–2011	CS Mioveni	5	(0)
2011–2013	Inter Clinceni		
Medal record
Rapid București
Winner	Cupa României	2006
- * Club domestic league appearances and goals as of 7 May 2016

Constantin Romeo Stancu (born 11 May 1978) is a former Romanian footballer.

== Honours ==
Rapid București

- Cupa României: 2005–06, 2006–07
- Supercupa României: 2007
