= Ionuț Cristian Stancu =

Romanian footballer

Ionuț Stancu
Personal information
- Full name: Ionuț Cristian Stancu
- Date of birth: 17 January 1983 (age 43)
- Place of birth: Craiova, Romania
- Height: 1.75 m (5 ft 9 in)
- Position: Defender

Team information
- Current team: Romania U21 (assistant)

Youth career
- Universitatea Craiova
- –2000: Școala de Fotbal Gheorghe Popescu

Senior career*
Years	Team	Apps	(Gls)
2001–2003	Universitatea Craiova	23	(1)
2001–2002	→ Rocar București (loan)	10	(0)
2004–2011	Rapid București	70	(2)
2008	→ Politehnica Iaşi (loan)	7	(0)
2009–2010	→ Pandurii Târgu Jiu (loan)	15	(0)
2011–2012	ALRO Slatina	26	(6)
2012–2013	Mioveni	20	(2)
2013–2014	Universitatea Craiova	9	(1)
2014	CSM Râmnicu Vâlcea	4	(0)
2015	FC Caransebeș	7	(0)
Total		191	(12)

International career
1998	Romania U16	5	(0)
2001	Romania U19	6	(0)
2002–2003	Romania U21	3	(0)

Managerial career
- 2019–2020: Universitatea II Craiova (assistant)
- 2020: Universitatea II Craiova
- 2021–2023: Universitatea Craiova (video analyst)
- 2023–2024: Universitatea Craiova (assistant)
- 2023–2025: Romania U20 (assistant)
- 2025: Universitatea Craiova (assistant)
- 2025: Universitatea Craiova U15
- 2026: FCSB (assistant)
- 2026: Gaziantep (assistant)
- 2026–: Romania U21 (assistant)
- * Club domestic league appearances and goals

Ionuț Cristian Stancu (born 17 January 1983) is a Romanian former professional football player, who played as a defender, currently assistant coach at Romania national under-21 team.

== Club career ==
Stancu started his career at Universitatea Craiova in 2001, featuring in the first team on occasion, before moving to Rapid București in 2004. His first match in Divizia A was on 14 March 2001 while playing for Universitatea Craiova against Petrolul Ploieşti.

== Honours ==
Rapid București

- Cupa României: 2005–06, 2006–07
- Supercupa României: 2007

Universitatea Craiova

- Liga II: 2013–14
