= Adrian Iencsi =

Romanian footballer and manager

Personal information
- Full name: Adrian Mihai Iencsi
- Date of birth: 15 March 1975 (age 51)
- Place of birth: Piatra Neamţ, Romania
- Height: 1.86 m (6 ft 1 in)
- Position: Defender

Team information
- Current team: Romania U20 (head coach)

Youth career
- 1985–1993: Ceahlăul Piatra Neamț

Senior career*
Years	Team	Apps	(Gls)
1993–1996	Ceahlăul Piatra Neamț	43	(2)
1995	→ Cetatea Târgu Neamț (loan)	17	(1)
1997–2004	Rapid București	190	(22)
2004–2006	Spartak Moscow	37	(2)
2007	Ceahlăul Piatra Neamț	10	(1)
2007–2008	Apollon Limassol	21	(1)
2008	Kapfenberg	4	(0)
2009–2010	Rapid București	22	(2)
2010	Concordia Chiajna	10	(0)
2011–2012	FCM Târgu Mureș	31	(2)
Total		385	(33)

International career
1996–1998	Romania U21	16	(0)
2000–2006	Romania	30	(1)

Managerial career
- 2009: Rapid București (player/assistant)
- 2012: Rapid București (sporting director)
- 2012–2013: CS Corbeanca
- 2013: Popești-Leordeni
- 2013–2014: Voluntari
- 2014–2015: Apollon Limassol (assistant)
- 2015: FC Hunedoara
- 2016: Sporting Turnu Măgurele
- 2016: Foresta Suceava
- 2017: Unirea Jucu
- 2017: Universitatea Craiova (assistant)
- 2017: Dunărea Călărași
- 2017: Pandurii Târgu Jiu
- 2018: Rapid București U19
- 2018–2019: Universitatea Cluj (assistant)
- 2019–2020: Universitatea II Craiova
- 2020: Rapid București
- 2022–2023: Sighetu Marmației
- 2023–2024: Rapid București (assistant)
- 2025–: Romania U20
- * Club domestic league appearances and goals

Adrian Mihai Iencsi (born 15 March 1975) is a Romanian football manager and a former player who played as a defender, currently the head coach of Romania national under-20 team.

== Career statistics ==
Appearances and goals by national team and year
National team	Year	Apps	Goals
Romania	2000	2	0
Romania	2001	3	0
Romania	2002	3	0
Romania	2003	8	0
Romania	2004	7	0
Romania	2005	3	1
Romania	2006	4	0
Total		30	1

Scores and results list Romania's goal tally first, score column indicates score after each Iencsi goal.

List of international goal scored by Adrian Iencsi
#	Date	Venue	Opponent	Score	Result	Competition
1	11 November 2005	Stade Léon-Bollée, Le Mans, France	Ivory Coast	1–1	1–2	Friendly

== Honours ==
=== Player ===
Rapid București

- Divizia A: 1998–99, 2002–03
- Cupa României: 1997–98, 2001–02
- Supercupa României: 2002, 2003

Spartak Moscow

- Russian Cup runner-up: 2005–06
- Russian Super Cup: 2006

Kapfenberger

- Erste Liga: 2007–08

=== Coach ===
Voluntari

- Liga III: 2013–14
