= Daniel Ghindeanu =

Romanian footballer

Personal information
- Full name: Robert Daniel Ghindeanu
- Date of birth: 23 September 1980 (age 46)
- Place of birth: Țuglui, Dolj, Romania
- Height: 1.74 m (5 ft 9 in)
- Position: Right-back

Senior career*
Years	Team	Apps	(Gls)
1999–2003	Extensiv Craiova	59	(2)
2003–2008	Naţional București	102	(2)
2008	Dacia Mioveni	14	(0)
2008–2010	Pandurii Târgu Jiu	31	(2)
2011	ALRO Slatina	10	(0)
2011–2012	CS Otopeni	20	(0)
Total		236	(6)
Medal record
Naţional București
Runner-up	Cupa României	2006
- * Club domestic league appearances and goals

Robert Daniel Ghindeanu (born 23 September 1980 in Țuglui, Dolj) is a Romanian former professional footballer who played as a right-back.
