= Camille Muzinga =

Congolese former football player (born 1980)

Personal information
- Full name: Camille Muzinga
- Date of birth: 12 June 1980 (age 46)
- Place of birth: Zaire
- Height: 1.80 m (5 ft 11 in)
- Position: Midfielder

Senior career*
Years	Team	Apps	(Gls)
1996	Sodigraf		
1997	DC Motemba Pembe		
1998–1999	Sint Niklaas	10	(0)
1999–2000	Lokeren	6	(0)
2000	Bursaspor	0	(0)
2001–2003	Lokeren	15	(0)
2003	Rapid Bucuresti	2	(0)
2003–2004	Lokeren	6	(0)
2004–2005	Al-Khor		
2005–2006	Ashdod		

International career^{‡}
2001–2004	DR Congo	6	(0)
- * Club domestic league appearances and goals as of 24 November 2015 ‡ National team caps and goals as of 15 October 2013

Camille Muzinga (born 6 December 1980) is a Congolese former football player.

== Club career ==
Muzinga played several seasons in the Belgian First Division with Lokeren.

== International career ==
He was part of the Congolese 2004 African Nations Cup team, who finished bottom of their group in the first round of competition, thus failing to secure qualification for the quarter-finals.

== Honours ==
Rapid Bucuresti

- Liga I: 2002–03
