= Abiodun Agunbiade =

Nigerian footballer (born 1983)

Personal information
- Date of birth: 2 January 1983 (age 43)
- Place of birth: Zaria, Nigeria
- Height: 1.75 m (5 ft 9 in)
- Position: Midfielder

Senior career*
Years	Team	Apps	(Gls)
1998–2000	Plateau United		
2000–2003	Sporting Braga	52	(3)
2000–2001	→ Sporting Braga B (loan)	50	(18)
2003–2004	Naval	25	(4)
2004–2006	Național București	40	(3)
2007–2009	Politehnica Timișoara	53	(3)
2009–2010	Internațional Curtea de Argeș	10	(0)
2010–2011	Çetinkaya Türk		
2012–2014	Merelinense	41	(7)
2014–2015	CD Celeirós	11	(1)
Total		282	(39)

International career
2005	Nigeria	1	(0)
Medal record
Național București
Runner-up	Romanian Cup	2006
Politehnica Timișoara
Runner-up	Romanian Cup	2007
Runner-up	Liga I	2009
Runner-up	Romanian Cup	2009
- * Club domestic league appearances and goals

Abiodun Agunbiade(born 2 January 1983) is a Nigerian former football player. He was a pacey and highly skillful dribbling midfielder that usually played on the right wing.

== Club career ==
=== Early career ===
Abiodun was born on 2 January 1983 in Zaria, Nigeria. He began playing football in 1998 at Plateau United, with whom he won the 1999 Nigeria Federation Cup.

=== Portugal ===
He joined Sporting Braga, making his Primeira Liga debut on 19 May 2001 when coach Manuel Cajuda sent him at half-time to replace Boher Samson in a 1–0 away loss to Farense. In his following game, Abiodun scored his first goal in a 5–3 home loss to Leiria. In the next two seasons, he played regularly for Braga, scoring two more goals, the first in a 1–1 draw against Benfica in March 2002 and the second in a 2–2 draw against Moreirense played in February 2003. Over the course of three seasons, he made a total of 52 Primeira Liga appearances with three goals scored for Braga. During the same period, Abiodun also played 50 games and scored 18 goals for Braga's B squad in the third league. Subsequently, he spent the 2003–04 season at Naval in the Portuguese second league.

=== Romania ===
Abiodun went to play for Romanian side, Național București, making his Liga I debut under coach Cosmin Olăroiu on 31 July 2004 in a 2–1 home win over FC Brașov. In the following round, he scored his first goal in the league when he opened the score in a 4–1 away victory against Politehnica Timișoara. In the following season, he scored two goals in two away wins over Gloria Bistrița and Argeș Pitești. The team also reached the 2006 Cupa României final where coach Cristiano Bergodi used him the entire match in the 1–0 loss to Rapid București.

Between the summer of 2006 and February 2007, Abiodun and teammate Wayne Srhoj didn't play a single official game, as they claimed their contract with Național had run out at the end of the 2005–06 season. After seven months of controversial court hearings and delays, the final decision favored the players who then signed with Politehnica Timișoara. In his first season with Politehnica, he reached the 2007 Cupa României final, being used for the full 90 minutes by coach Valentin Velcea in the 2–0 loss to Rapid București. In the following season, Abiodun played regularly for the team, scoring three goals in three league victories against Gloria Bistrița, Pandurii Târgu Jiu and in the West derby against UTA Arad. In his last season spent with Politehnica, the team finished runner-up in the league and in the Cupa României, but this time coach Velcea did not use him in the final. He also made his only appearance in European competitions, playing in a 2–1 home loss to Partizan Belgrade in the 2008–09 UEFA Cup first round. In 2009, Abiodun signed with Internațional Curtea de Argeș where on 16 March 2010, he played his last Liga I match in a 2–1 away win over FC Brașov, having a total of 103 appearances with six goals scored in the competition.

=== Late career ===
In 2010, Abiodun joined Northern Cyprus side, Çetinkaya Türk with whom he won the domestic cup in 2011. Afterwards, Abiodun returned to Portugal, concluding his career with three seasons spent in the third league at Merelinense and CD Celeirós.

== International career ==
Abiodun played one friendly match for Nigeria on 16 November 2005, when coach Daniel Amokachi used him as a starter in a 3–0 loss to Romania.

== Honours ==
Plateau United

- Nigeria Federation Cup: 1999

Național București

- Cupa României runner-up: 2005–06

Politehnica Timișoara

- Liga I runner-up: 2008–09
- Cupa României runner-up: 2006–07, 2008–09

Çetinkaya Türk

- Northern Cyprus Cup: 2011
