= Dănuț Coman =

Romanian professional footballer

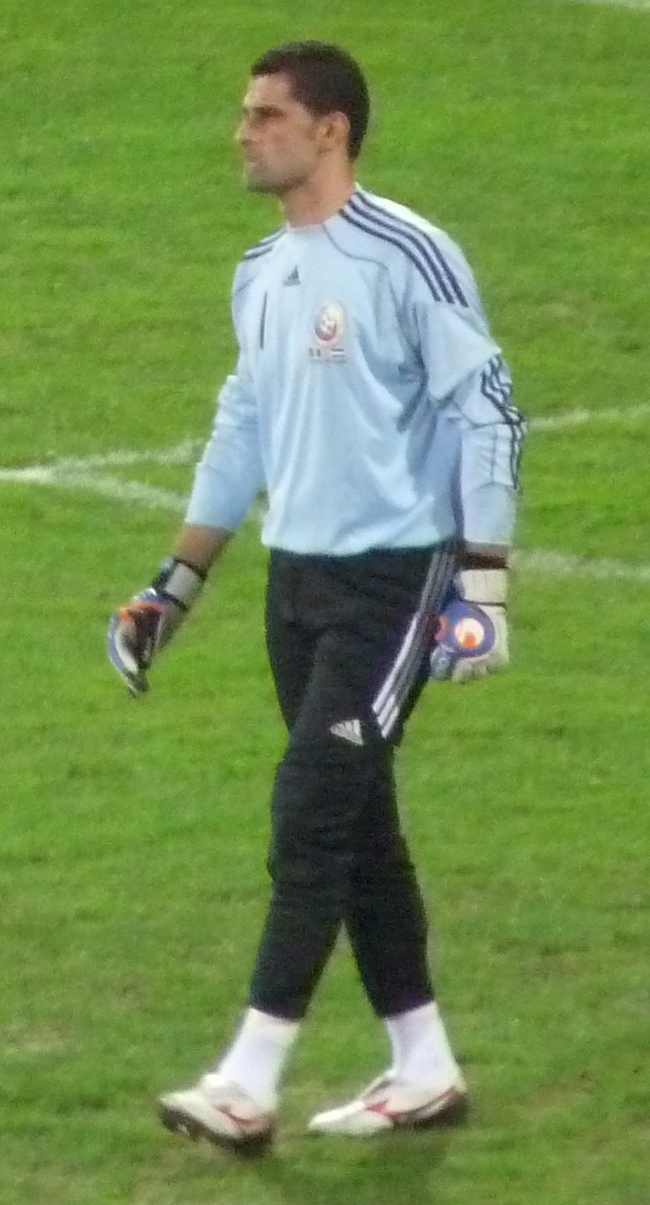
- Coman with Romania in 2009

Personal information
- Full name: Dănuț Dumitru Coman
- Date of birth: 28 March 1979 (age 47)
- Place of birth: Ștefănești, Romania
- Height: 1.80 m (5 ft 11 in)
- Position: Goalkeeper

Team information
- Current team: Argeș Pitești (chairman)

Youth career
- 1988–1990: CSȘ Aripi Pitești
- 1990–1997: Argeș Pitești

Senior career*
Years	Team	Apps	(Gls)
1997–2004	Argeș Pitești	61	(0)
1999	→ Rocar București (loan)	10	(0)
2005–2008	Rapid București	82	(0)
2008–2010	FC Brașov	33	(0)
2010–2012	Rapid București	42	(0)
2012–2013	Vaslui	18	(0)
2013–2015	Astra Giurgiu	16	(0)
Total		262	(0)

International career
1998–2000	Romania U21	25	(0)
2005–2009	Romania	14	(0)

Managerial career
- 2015–2021: Astra Giurgiu (chairman)
- 2021–2022: Hermannstadt (chairman)
- 2023–2024: Hermannstadt (chairman)
- 2024–: Argeș Pitești (chairman)
- * Club domestic league appearances and goals

Dănuț Dumitru Coman (born 28 March 1979) is a Romanian former footballer who played as a goalkeeper, currently the president of Liga I club Argeș Pitești.

Coman started out as a senior at FC Argeș in the 1997–98 season and also played for Rocar București, Rapid București, Brașov and Vaslui before retiring at Astra Giurgiu aged 36, where he was afterwards offered an administrative position in the club.

His career honours include three Cupa României and one Supercupa României, having won three of these trophies during his first spell at Rapid between 2005 and 2008. Coman represented the Romania national team in 14 matches.

== Club career ==
He started playing football at 18 years old, at Argeș Pitești and played his first game in A Division (first Romanian league) on 28 February 1998 against Dinamo București but unfortunately for him he was defeated twice and his team lost with 2–0. In the first season for FC Argeș 1997–1998 he played another three games.

In the next season he did not get any opportunity to play and at the half of the season was transferred to Rocar București where he played 10 games. He returned to FC Argeș in 1999 but did not play too much in the next four seasons, only 17 games during this time. Starting with the 2003–04 season, Coman became the titular goalkeeper in FC Argeș's goal and played in most of the games: 22. The next season was the last for him at Argeș Pitești and at the half of season was transferred to Rapid Bucharest. In total he played 69 games for FC Argeș.

At the end of his first season for Rapid București, they finished on the third place in the championship and Coman played in almost all the games, only missing one. In the next season 2005–06, Coman played in 22 games and in the end the club finished the season in second place and won the vice-champion title and the Romanian Cup after they defeated Național București in the final.

In the European Cups Coman debuted with Rapid Bucharest in the 2005–06 season in UEFA Cup. This was the best season for Rapid in Europe. They succeeded to qualify in UEFA Cup's groups after they eliminated Feyenoord Rotterdam in a group with PAOK Thessaloniki, Shakhtar Donetsk, Stade Rennais F.C. and VfB Stuttgart. Rapid defeated PAOK, Shakhtar and Rennes and were defeated by VfB Stuttgart but they still qualified in the next round where they eliminated Hertha BSC after two great games by Coman. They also eliminated another German team, Hamburger SV and played the quarter final against Steaua București, their great Romanian rival. After two draws they lost the qualification against Steaua.

On 13 December 2008, Coman, who was tracked by Bordeaux and Standard Liége, left Rapid Bucharest to sign for FC Brașov only to return to Rapid in the 2010 season.

Coman left Rapid on 16 July 2012 to sign a two-year contract with FC Vaslui. After only one season, he left Vaslui to play for Astra Giurgiu, where he ended his career in 2015, but agreed to stay at the club as chairman.

== International career ==
Coman amassed 14 caps for the Romania national team. He made his debut on 16 November 2005, in a friendly game against Nigeria.

He was initially Romania's second-choice goalkeeper for the UEFA Euro 2008 behind Bogdan Lobonț, but a last-minute injury before the tournament made coach Victor Pițurcă to call up Eduard Stăncioiu of CFR Cluj instead.

== After retirement ==
In 2015, Coman took up the chairman role at Astra Giurgiu, his last playing club. The greatest achievement during his tenure was the winning of the national title in the 2015–16 season.

Following Astra's relegation at the conclusion of the 2020–21 season, Coman moved to also recently-relegated Hermannstadt, which he aided in returning to the top flight after only one season.

== Career statistics ==
=== International ===
Appearances and goals by national team and year
National team	Year	Apps	Goals
Romania	2005	1	0
Romania	2006	6	0
Romania	2007	2	0
Romania	2008	0	0
Romania	2009	5	0
Total		14	0

== Honours ==
=== Player ===
Rapid București

- Cupa României: 2005–06, 2006–07
- Supercupa României: 2007

Astra Giurgiu

- Cupa României: 2013–14
- Supercupa României: 2014
