= Noureddine Ziyati =

Moroccan footballer

Personal information
- Date of birth: 27 October 1974 (age 52)
- Place of birth: Mohammedia, Morocco
- Height: 1.87 m (6 ft 2 in)
- Position: Midfielder

Youth career
- Chabab Mohammedia

Senior career*
Years	Team	Apps	(Gls)
1998–1999	Raja Casablanca		
1999–2000	Bursaspor	8	(1)
2000–2003	Royal Antwerp FC	68	(1)
2003–2004	Rapid București	28	(3)
2004–2006	Amkar Perm	59	(3)
2007	Al-Sailiya		
2007–2008	FUS Rabat		
2008–2011	Chabab Mohammédia		(3)

International career
	Morocco U17	18	(0)
	Morocco U21	5	(0)
- * Club domestic league appearances and goals

Noureddine Ziyati (born 27 October 1974) is a Moroccan former football player.

== Honours ==
Rapid București

- Supercupa României: 2003
