= Mugurel Buga =

Romanian footballer

Personal information
- Full name: Mugurel Mihai Buga
- Date of birth: 16 December 1977 (age 48)
- Place of birth: Brașov, Romania
- Height: 1.77 m (5 ft 10 in)
- Positions: Forward; attacking midfielder

Team information
- Current team: FC Brașov (sporting manager)

Youth career
- 1987–1996: Brașov

Senior career*
Years	Team	Apps	(Gls)
1996–2005	Brașov	199	(47)
2000	→ Rapid București (loan)	3	(0)
2005–2009	Rapid București	105	(36)
2008–2009	→ Brașov (loan)	12	(1)
2010–2011	Skoda Xanthi	23	(3)
2011–2016	Brașov	121	(21)
2016–2019	AFC Hărman	44	(19)
2019–2020	Corona Brașov	15	(8)
Total		522	(135)

International career
2006–2007	Romania	6	(1)

Managerial career
- 2016: Brașov (assistant)
- 2017–2019: AFC Hărman (assistant)
- 2024–: SR Brașov (sporting director)
- * Club domestic league appearances and goals

Mugurel Mihai Buga (born 16 December 1977), nicknamed "Pele" by fans, is a Romanian former professional footballer who played as a forward or attacking midfielder.

On 31 December 2009, he was declared a free agent by LPF. On 8 January 2010 he agreed terms with Skoda Xanthi, where he played until the summer of 2011, before returning to his youth club FC Brașov on 15 July.

== Honours ==
FC Brașov

- Liga II: 1998–99

Rapid București

- Cupa României: 2005–06, 2006–07
- Supercupa României: 2007
