= Țuglui =

- Commune
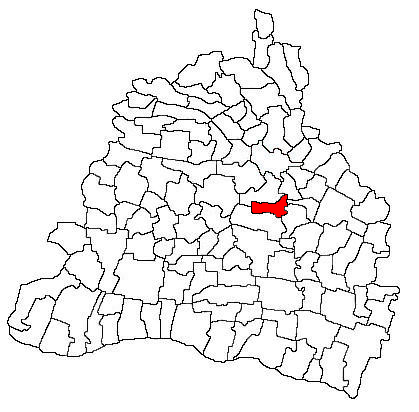
- Location in Dolj County

- Location in Romania
- Coordinates: 44°11′N 23°49′E
- Country: Romania
- County: Dolj
- Area: 39.04 km^{2} (15.07 sq mi)
- Population (2021-12-01): 2,734
  - Density: 70.03/km^{2} (181.4/sq mi)
- Time zone: UTC+02:00 (EET)
  - Summer (DST): UTC+03:00 (EEST)
- Vehicle reg.: DJ

Țuglui is a commune in Dolj County, Oltenia, Romania with a population of 2,889 people. It is composed of two villages: Jiul and Țuglui.
