= 2002 Supercupa României =

- Event: 2002 Supercupa României
Dinamo București	Rapid București
Divizia A	Cupa României
1	2
- Date: 10 August 2002
- Venue: Stadionul Național, Bucharest
- Referee: Alexandru Tudor (Romania)
- Attendance: 10,000

The 2002 Supercupa României was the 6th edition of Romania's season opener cup competition. The match was played in Bucharest at Stadionul Național on 10 August 2002, and was contested between Divizia A title holders Dinamo București and Cupa României champions Rapid București. Rapid won the trophy after defeating Dinamo 2-1.

== Match ==
=== Details ===
10 August 2002
21:00 EEST

Dinamo București	1–2	Rapid București
Munteanu 40'	Report	Bratu 18'; Perjă 71'

Stadionul Național, Bucharest
Attendance: 10,000
Referee: Alexandru Tudor (Romania)

Dinamo București	Rapid București

DINAMO BUCUREȘTI:
GK	23	(Romania) Cristian Munteanu
DF	3	(Romania) Giani Kiriță	(yellow card) 34'
DF	17	(Romania) Ciprian Danciu	(yellow card) 37'	(substituted off) 88'
DF	6	(Romania) Bogdan Onuț	(red card) 91'
DF	7	(Romania) Mugur Bolohan	(yellow card) 43'	(substituted off) 85'
MF	8	(Romania) Florentin Petre (c)
MF	5	(Romania) Dan Alexa
MF	24	(Romania) Vlad Munteanu		(substituted off) 63'
MF	16	(Romania) Cornel Frăsineanu
FW	24	(Romania) Cosmin Bărcăuan
FW	10	(Romania) Ionel Dănciulescu
Substitutes:
MF	18	(Romania) Florin Pârvu		(substituted in) 88'
DF	2	(Romania) Flavius Stoican		(substituted in) 85'
MF	20	(Romania) Iulian Tameș		(substituted in) 63'
Manager:
(Romania) Cornel Țălnar

RAPID BUCUREȘTI:
GK	1	(Romania) Emilian Dolha
DF	17	(Romania) Dănuț Perjă
DF	4	(Romania) Vasile Maftei
DF	6	(Romania) Florin Șoavă
DF	13	(Romania) Ion Voicu	(yellow card) 29'	(substituted off) 52'
MF	8	(Romania) Ioan Sabău
MF	10	(Romania) Constantin Schumacher (c)
MF	20	(Belgium) Emmanuel Godfroid
MF	5	(Romania) Răzvan Raț
FW	15	(Romania) Florin Bratu		(substituted off) 70'
FW	21	(Romania) Daniel Niculae		(substituted off) 92'
Substitutes:
DF	2	(Romania) Cornel Buta	(yellow card) 59'	(substituted in) 52'
MF	16	(Romania) Nicolae Grigore		(substituted in) 92'
FW	7	(Romania) Robert Niță		(substituted in) 70'
Manager:
(Romania) Mircea Rednic

MATCH OFFICIALS

- Assistant referees:
  - Tudor Constantinescu
  - Cristian Nica
- Fourth official:

MAN OF THE MATCH

MATCH RULES

- 90 minutes.
- 30 minutes extra-time (15 minute intervals)
- Penalty shoot-out if scores level after extra time.
- Seven named substitutes
- Maximum of 3 substitutions.

== See also ==
- 2002–03 Divizia A
- 2002–03 Cupa României
