= 2007 Cupa României final =

- Event: Cupa României 2006–07
Politehnica Timișoara	Rapid București
Liga I	Liga I
0	2
- Date: 26 May 2007
- Venue: Stadionul Dan Păltinișanu, Timișoara
- Man of the Match: Ianis Zicu (Rapid București)
- Referee: Augustus Constantin (Romania)
- Attendance: 40,000

The 2007 Cupa României final was the 69th final of Romania's most prestigious cup competition. The final was played at the Stadionul Dan Păltinişanu in Timișoara on 26 May 2007 and was contested between Liga I sides FCU Politehnica Timișoara and Rapid București. The cup was won by Rapid after goals from Buga and Zicu with the latter winning the Man Of The Match Award.

== Route to the final ==
Politehnica Timișoara

Round of 32	Politehnica II Timișoara	1–3	Politehnica Timișoara
Round of 16	Politehnica Timișoara	2–0	CFR Cluj
Quarter-finals	Politehnica Timișoara	2–1	Politehnica Iaşi
Semi-finals	Politehnica Timișoara	1–0	Steaua București

Rapid București

Round of 32	CSM Râmnicu Vâlcea	0–4	Rapid București
Round of 16	Rapid București	1–0	Universitatea Craiova
Quarter-finals	Rapid București	2–0	Argeş Piteşti
Semi-finals	Pandurii Târgu Jiu	0–2	Rapid București

== Match details ==
26 May 2007
20:45 EEST

Politehnica Timișoara	0–2	Rapid București
	Report	Buga 15'; Zicu 48'

Stadionul Dan Păltinișanu, Timișoara
Attendance: 40,000
Referee: Augustus Constantin (Romania)

Politehnica Timișoara	Rapid București

Politehnica Timișoara:
GK	29	(Romania) Costel Pantilimon
DF	14	(Romania) Sorin Rădoi
DF	4	(Australia) Jonathan McKain
DF	23	(Romania) Gabriel Cânu	(yellow card) 66'
DF	13	(Nigeria) Ifeanyi Emeghara
MF	31	(Nigeria) Abiodun Agunbiade
MF	5	(Romania) Dan Alexa	(c) (yellow card) 83'
MF	10	(Romania) Mihăiţă Pleşan	(yellow card) 26'	(substituted off) 58'
MF	25	(Romania) Gabriel Torje
FW	24	(Senegal) Gueye Mansour	(yellow card) 51'	(substituted off) 55'
FW	18	(Romania) Gheorghe Bucur
Substitutes:
GK	12	(Romania) Marius Popa
DF	6	(Romania) Silviu Izvoranu
MF	7	(Romania) Ştefan Grigorie
MF	17	(Nigeria) Peter Omoduemuke	(red card) 61'	(substituted in) 58'
MF	30	(Australia) Wayne Srhoj
FW	15	(Romania) Andrei Cristea		(substituted in) 55'
FW	77	(Armenia) Artavazd Karamyan
Manager:
(Romania) Valentin Velcea

Rapid București:
GK	1	(Romania) Dănuţ Coman
DF	23	(Romania) Marius Constantin	(yellow card) 9'
DF	24	(Romania) Vasile Maftei	(c) (yellow card) 60'
DF	6	(Romania) Ionuţ Rada	(yellow card) 51'
MF	9	(Romania) Valentin Bădoi		(substituted off) 70'
MF	17	(Romania) Marius Măldărăşanu	(yellow card) 28'
MF	18	(Romania) Nicolae Grigore	(yellow card) 74'
DF	14	(Romania) Dănuț Perjă
FW	7	(Romania) Ianis Zicu
FW	29	(Romania) Mugurel Buga		(substituted off) 76'
FW	27	(Romania) Ionuţ Mazilu		(substituted off) 82'
Substitutes:
GK	32	(Romania) Mihai Mincă
DF	5	(Romania) Ionuţ Stancu
DF	21	(Romania) Cristian Săpunaru
MF	10	(Romania) Emil Dică		(substituted in) 76'
MF	15	(Romania) Costin Lazăr		(substituted in) 70'
FW	19	(Romania) Ionel Ganea
FW	99	(Romania) Viorel Moldovan		(substituted in) 82'
Manager:
(Romania) Răzvan Lucescu

Match Officials

- Assistant referees:
  - (Romania) Adrian Vidan
  - (Romania) Corneliu Fecioru
- Fourth official:
  - (Romania) Cristian Balaj

Man of the match

- (Romania) Ianis Zicu (Rapid București)

Match rules

- 90 minutes.
- 30 minutes extra-time (15 minute intervals)
- Penalty shoot-out if scores level after extra time.
- Seven named substitutes
- Maximum of 3 substitutions.
