= 2006 Cupa României final =

- Event: Cupa României 2005–06
Rapid București	Naţional București
Liga I	Liga I
1	0
- Date: 17 May 2006
- Venue: Stadionul Naţional, Bucharest
- Referee: Sorin Corpodean (Romania)
- Attendance: 12,000

The 2006 Cupa României final was the 68th final of Romania's most prestigious cup competition. The final was played at the Stadionul Naţional in Bucharest on 17 May 2006 and was contested between Liga I sides Rapid București and Naţional București. The cup was won by Rapid.

== Route to the final ==
Rapid București

Round of 32	FCM Reşiţa	0–1	Rapid București
Round of 16	Cetatea Suceava	2–3	Rapid București
Quarter-finals	Politehnica Iaşi	0–1	Rapid București
Semi-finals 1st Leg	Rapid București	4–1	Petrolul Ploieşti
Semi-finals 2nd Leg	Petrolul Ploieşti	3–3	Rapid București

Naţional București

Round of 32	CFR Timişoara	1–3	Naţional București
Round of 16	Naţional București	0–0 (aet, p. 4 – 3)	Universitatea Craiova
Quarter-finals	Oţelul Galaţi	0–0 (aet, p. 3 – 4)	Naţional București
Semi-finals 1st Leg	Farul Constanţa	1–0	Naţional București
Semi-finals 2nd Leg	Naţional București	4–1	Farul Constanţa

== Match details ==
17 May 2006
20:15 EEST

Rapid București	1–0 (a.e.t.)	Naţional București
Niculae 91'	Report

Stadionul Naţional, Bucharest
Attendance: 12,000
Referee: Sorin Corpodean (Romania)

Rapid București	Naţional București

Rapid București:
GK	1	(Romania) Dănuţ Coman
DF	23	(Romania) Marius Constantin
DF	24	(Romania) Vasile Maftei (c)
DF	6	(Romania) Ionuţ Rada
MF	9	(Romania) Valentin Bădoi
MF	18	(Romania) Nicolae Grigore		(substituted off) 67'
MF	25	(Romania) Romeo Stancu
MF	10	(Armenia) Artavazd Karamyan		(substituted off) 99'
FW	29	(Romania) Mugurel Buga
FW	21	(Romania) Daniel Niculae
FW	19	(Romania) Daniel Pancu		(substituted off) 55'
Substitutes:
GK	32	(Romania) Mihai Mincă
DF	5	(Romania) Ionuţ Stancu		(substituted in) 99'
DF	14	(Romania) Dănuț Perjă
MF	7	(Romania) Ciprian Vasilache
MF	8	(Romania) Valentin Negru	(yellow card) 115'	(substituted in) 67'
FW	20	(Romania) Lucian Burdujan
FW	99	(Romania) Viorel Moldovan		(substituted in) 55'
Manager:
(Romania) Răzvan Lucescu

Naţional București:
GK	13	(Romania) Eugen Nae
DF	19	(Romania) Cristian Săpunaru	(yellow card) 100'
DF	27	(Romania) Ovidiu Burcă (c)
DF	4	(Serbia and Montenegro) Ersin Mehmedović
DF	5	(Romania) Mihai Panc
MF	23	(Nigeria) Abiodun Agunbiade
MF	10	(Australia) Wayne Srhoj		(substituted off) 63'
MF	28	(Romania) Zeno Bundea		(substituted off) 92'
MF	15	(Romania) Ovidiu Herea
MF	7	(Romania) Iulian Tameş		(substituted off) 32'
FW	11	(Australia) Ryan Griffiths
Substitutes:
GK	12	(Bulgaria) Radostin Stanev
DF	2	(Romania) Emil Ninu
DF	8	(Romania) Costel Mozacu	(yellow card) 107'	(substituted in) 32'
DF	14	(Romania) Daniel Ghindeanu		(substituted in) 63'
DF	17	(Romania) Alin Marcu
FW	6	(Romania) Daniel Marin		(substituted in) 92'
FW	9	(Romania) Octavian Chihaia
Manager:
(Italy) Cristiano Bergodi

Match officials:

- Assistant referees:
  - (Romania) Aurel Oniţa
  - (Romania) Ionel Popa
- Fourth official:
  - (Romania) Alexandru Tudor

Match rules:

- 90 minutes.
- 30 minutes extra-time (15-minute intervals)
- Penalty shoot-out if scores level after extra time.
- Seven named substitutes
- Maximum of 3 substitutions.
