= 2002–03 Divizia A =

85th season of top-tier football league in Romania

Divizia A
- Season: 2002–03
- Champions: Rapid București
- Relegated: Sportul Studențesc; UTA Arad
- Champions League: Rapid București
- UEFA Cup: Steaua București; Dinamo București
- Intertoto Cup: Gloria Bistrița; Ceahlăul Piatra Neamț
- Matches played: 240
- Goals scored: 627 (2.61 per match)
- Top goalscorer: Claudiu Răducanu (21)
- Biggest home win: Ceahlăul 6–0 UTA; UTA 6–0 Bistrița
- Biggest away win: Farul 0–5 Național
- Highest scoring: Sportul 5–6 Dinamo
- Longest winning run: Rapid (6)
- Longest unbeaten run: FC U, Steaua (9)
- Longest losing run: Politehnica (9)

The 2002–03 Divizia A was the eighty-fifth season of Divizia A, the top-level football league of Romania. Season began in August 2002 and ended in May 2003. Rapid București became champions on 24 May 2003.

== Team changes ==
=== Relegated ===
The teams that were relegated to Divizia B at the end of the previous season:

- Petrolul Ploiești
- UM Timișoara

=== Promoted ===
The teams that were promoted from Divizia B at the start of the season:

- Poli AEK Timișoara
- UTA Arad

=== Venues ===
Poli AEK Timișoara	Steaua București	Universitatea Craiova	Rapid București
Dan Păltinișanu	Steaua	Ion Oblemenco	Giulești-Valentin Stănescu
Capacity: 32,972	Capacity: 28,365	Capacity: 25,252	Capacity: 19,100
FCM Bacău	Farul Constanța	Dinamo București	Argeș Pitești
Dumitru Sechelariu	Gheorghe Hagi	Dinamo	Nicolae Dobrin
Capacity: 17,500	Capacity: 15,520	Capacity: 15,032	Capacity: 15,000
Sportul Studențesc	2002–03 Divizia A (Romania) Location of Bucharest teams.		Național București
Regie	2002–03 Divizia A (Romania) Location of Bucharest teams.		Cotroceni
Capacity: 15,000	2002–03 Divizia A (Romania) Location of Bucharest teams.		Capacity: 14,542
Oțelul Galați	2002–03 Divizia A (Romania) Location of Bucharest teams.		Ceahlăul Piatra Neamț
Oțelul	2002–03 Divizia A (Romania) Location of Bucharest teams.		Ceahlăul
Capacity: 13,500	2002–03 Divizia A (Romania) Location of Bucharest teams.		Capacity: 12,500
FC Brașov	UTA Arad	Gloria Bistrița	Astra Ploiești
Tineretului	UTA	Gloria	Astra
Capacity: 10,000	Capacity: 10,000	Capacity: 7,800	Capacity: 7,000

=== Personnel and kits ===
Team	Head coach	Captain	Kit manufacturer	Shirt Sponsor
Argeș Pitești	(Romania) Ion Moldovan	(Romania) Cristian Bălașa	Erreà	Pic
Astra Ploiești	(Romania) Florin Marin	(Romania) Daniel Petroesc	Lotto	Petrom, InterAgro
Brașov	(Romania) Marius Lăcătuș	(Romania) Cosmin Bodea	Joma	Prescon
Ceahlăul Piatra Neamț	(Romania) Viorel Hizo	(Romania) Radu Lefter	Ancada	Rifil, Romalfa
Dinamo București	(Romania) Ioan Andone	(Romania) Giani Kiriță	Lotto	Cosmorom
Farul Constanța	(Romania) Marin Ion	(Romania) Cristian Șchiopu	Erreà	Argus
Universitatea Craiova	(Romania) Sorin Cârțu	(Romania) Pavel Badea	Erreà	SIF Oltenia
FCM Bacău	(Romania) Ilie Dumitrescu	(Romania) Florin Prunea	Legea	Sonoma
Gloria Bistrița	(Romania) Remus Vlad	(Romania) Vasile Popa	Umbro	Darimex
Național București	(Italy) Walter Zenga	(Romania) Petre Marin	Lotto	Astra Asigurări, LG Corporation
Oțelul Galați	(Romania) Costel Orac	(Romania) Cătălin Tofan	Lotto	Ispat Sidex
Poli AEK Timișoara	(Romania) Gheorghe Mulțescu	(Romania) Florin Constantinovici	Erreà	ARGIROM
Rapid București	(Romania) Mircea Rednic	(Romania) Adrian Iencsi	Erreà	LaDorna
Sportul Studențesc	(Romania) Cezar Zamfir	(Romania) Laurențiu Diniță	Lotto	Omniasig
Steaua București	(Romania) Victor Pițurcă	(Romania) Mirel Rădoi	Nike	—
UTA Arad	(Romania) Constantin Pană	(Romania) Marius Popescu	Erreà	—

== League table ==
Pos	Team	Pld	W	D	L	GF	GA	GD	Pts	Qualification or relegation
1	Rapid București (C)	30	20	3	7	59	25	+34	63	Qualification to Champions League second qualifying round
2	Steaua București	30	16	8	6	42	27	+15	56	Qualification to UEFA Cup qualifying round
3	Gloria Bistrița	30	13	6	11	32	33	−1	45 (Note: GLO 3-1 BRA; BRA 0-1 GLO)	Qualification to Intertoto Cup first round
4	Brașov	30	13	6	11	37	33	+4	45	
5	Ceahlăul Piatra Neamț	30	12	8	10	43	33	+10	44	Qualification to Intertoto Cup first round
6	Dinamo București	30	13	5	12	49	46	+3	44	Qualification to UEFA Cup qualifying round
7	Universitatea Craiova	30	12	8	10	36	37	−1	44	
8	Național București	30	12	7	11	41	36	+5	43	
9	Astra Ploiești	30	13	3	14	42	42	0	42	
10	Farul Constanța	30	12	4	14	35	47	−12	40	
11	Argeș Pitești	30	11	5	14	37	41	−4	38 (Note: ARG 3-1 BAC; BAC 2-3 ARG)	
12	Bacău	30	10	8	12	31	31	0	38	
13	Oțelul Galați	30	9	9	12	25	37	−12	36	Qualification to relegation play-offs
14	Politehnica AEK Timișoara	30	11	2	17	37	52	−15	35	Qualification to relegation play-offs
15	Sportul Studențesc București (R)	30	9	4	17	44	55	−11	31	Relegation to Divizia B
16	UTA Arad (R)	30	8	6	16	37	52	−15	30	Relegation to Divizia B

Source: LT (in Romanian)
Rules for classification: 1) points; 2) head-to-head points; 3) head-to-head goal difference; 4) head-to-head goals scored; 5) goal difference; 6) number of goals scored.
(C) Champions; (R) Relegated

=== Positions by round ===
Team ╲ Round	1	2	3	4	5	6	7	8	9	10	11	12	13	14	15	16	17	18	19	20	21	22	23	24	25	26	27	28	29	30
Argeș Pitești	14	12	15	14	15	14	13	12	12	12	10	11	9	11	14	14	12	13	12	12	13	11	12	11	11	11	10	12	10	11
Astra Ploiești	13	8	10	13	14	15	16	16	14	16	15	16	15	15	13	10	11	9	7	9	8	10	7	7	9	8	7	8	7	9
Bacău	15	14	13	12	11	13	15	15	16	15	14	13	11	12	9	9	7	6	6	8	10	12	10	10	10	10	12	11	12	12
Brașov	7	10	6	10	12	12	10	9	7	5	6	5	5	6	7	5	6	7	8	6	5	5	3	3	4	3	3	3	3	4
Ceahlăul Piatra Neamț	16	7	9	9	9	10	9	7	10	10	12	15	12	13	10	12	10	8	11	11	9	6	6	6	6	9	9	9	8	5
Universitatea Craiova	2	3	1	1	4	6	6	11	11	13	11	12	10	9	11	11	13	15	15	13	11	7	8	8	7	6	5	7	9	7
Dinamo București	1	6	7	8	6	7	8	8	6	3	2	4	2	2	2	2	3	4	5	5	7	9	9	9	8	7	6	6	5	6
Farul Constanța	8	13	11	11	7	9	11	10	8	9	9	10	14	10	15	15	14	11	10	7	6	8	11	12	12	12	11	10	11	10
Gloria Bistrița	9	5	8	4	8	5	4	2	2	2	5	6	7	8	5	6	5	5	4	4	4	4	5	5	5	5	8	5	4	3
Oțelul Galați	3	9	5	6	5	3	3	4	9	8	8	7	8	7	8	8	8	10	9	10	12	13	13	14	13	13	13	13	13	13
Național București	5	2	3	5	3	2	2	3	3	4	3	2	3	3	4	4	2	2	2	3	3	3	4	4	3	4	4	4	6	8
Rapid București	6	1	4	2	1	1	1	1	1	1	1	1	1	1	1	1	1	1	1	1	1	1	1	1	1	1	1	1	1	1
Sportul Studențesc	11	15	12	7	10	11	12	13	13	11	13	9	13	14	12	13	15	14	13	14	14	14	15	13	15	15	15	15	15	15
Steaua București	10	11	14	15	13	8	7	5	4	6	7	8	6	4	3	3	4	3	3	2	2	2	2	2	2	2	2	2	2	2
Politehnica AEK Timișoara	4	4	2	3	2	4	5	6	5	7	4	3	4	5	6	7	9	12	14	15	15	15	14	15	14	14	14	14	14	14
UTA Arad	12	16	16	16	16	16	14	14	15	14	16	14	16	16	16	16	16	16	16	16	16	16	16	16	16	16	16	16	16	16

Source: LT (in Romanian)

=== Results ===
Home \ Away	ARG	AST	BAC	BRA	CEA	FCU	DIN	FAR	GBI	OȚE	NAT	RAP	SPO	STE	TIM	UTA
Argeș Pitești	—	1–0	3–1	0–0	2–1	2–2	2–0	2–1	2–0	2–2	2–0	0–2	0–2	2–3	5–1	1–0
Astra Ploiești	2–1	—	2–0	1–0	2–2	2–0	4–2	2–1	2–0	2–0	3–2	0–2	3–2	0–1	2–1	1–1
Bacău	2–3	2–0	—	4–0	0–0	2–3	3–1	1–2	0–0	0–1	2–2	2–1	1–0	0–1	1–0	1–0
Brașov	2–0	1–1	0–1	—	1–0	3–1	2–2	2–0	0–1	3–2	0–1	2–0	3–2	0–0	2–0	2–1
Ceahlăul Piatra Neamț	0–1	2–1	0–0	2–1	—	3–0	3–2	0–0	3–0	4–0	3–1	1–2	2–2	1–0	3–2	6–0
Universitatea Craiova	0–0	3–1	0–0	2–1	0–0	—	3–1	0–1	2–0	2–0	0–2	1–3	2–0	3–1	1–0	1–1
Dinamo București	3–0	0–3	1–1	1–0	5–0	1–0	—	2–0	0–2	1–0	1–1	0–2	3–1	2–4	2–1	5–0
Farul Constanța	2–1	1–4	0–3	0–1	4–2	2–2	0–1	—	0–0	0–1	0–5	2–1	1–0	2–1	3–1	1–0
Gloria Bistrița	1–0	2–0	0–0	3–1	1–0	4–0	1–0	1–3	—	1–0	3–0	0–3	3–0	0–0	2–0	4–1
Oțelul Galați	2–0	2–1	1–0	0–2	0–0	0–1	2–0	2–2	1–0	—	2–1	0–0	0–0	1–1	2–2	2–1
Național București	3–1	1–0	0–0	0–2	1–3	1–2	0–2	4–1	0–0	0–0	—	1–1	5–1	0–0	1–0	2–1
Rapid București	1–0	4–1	2–0	1–1	1–0	0–2	3–1	5–1	3–1	5–2	2–0	—	0–1	1–2	3–0	3–0
Sportul Studențesc	4–2	3–0	0–3	1–2	0–1	3–1	5–6	0–3	1–1	2–0	2–1	1–2	—	1–2	3–1	0–0
Steaua București	1–0	1–0	3–0	1–1	0–0	0–0	1–1	1–0	3–0	1–0	0–2	2–1	4–3	—	0–1	5–2
Politehnica AEK Timișoara	1–0	2–1	2–0	2–1	2–0	2–1	2–3	2–1	2–1	0–0	1–2	1–3	3–2	1–3	—	3–4
UTA Arad	2–2	2–1	3–1	3–1	2–1	1–1	0–0	0–1	6–0	3–0	1–2	0–2	0–2	2–0	0–1	—

Source: LT (in Romanian)
Legend: Blue = home team win; Yellow = draw; Red = away team win.

== Promotion / relegation play-off ==
The teams placed on the 13th and 14th place in the Divizia A faced the 2nd placed teams from both groups of the Divizia B. Politehnica AEK Timișoara and FC Oradea won the relegation play-offs.

Even though Oțelul Galați lost the relegation play-off against FC Oradea, they kept their place in the Divizia A because Petrolul Ploiești, the club that won the Divizia B, Seria I, sold its promotion place to Oțelul Galați and merged with Astra Ploiești, the other team from the city of Ploiești, which finished on the 9th position this season.

Team 1	Agg.	Team 2	1st leg	2nd leg
Politehnica AEK Timișoara	8–4	Gloria Buzău	5–3	3–1
Oțelul Galați	3–4	Oradea	2–1	1–3

14 June 2003 Leg 1	Politehnica AEK Timișoara	5–3	Gloria Buzău	Stadionul Dan Păltinișanu
	Zanc 28'; Silvășan 54'; Bătrânu 59'; Prodan 71'; Oprea 90+3'		Gheorghe 13'; Petre 26'; Apostol 68'

14 June 2003 Leg 1	Oțelul Galați	2–1	Oradea	Stadionul Oțelul
	Cornea 28'; Guriță 67'		Vrăjitoarea 45+1'(p)

18 June 2003 Leg 2	Gloria Buzău	1–3	Politehnica AEK Timișoara	Stadionul Municipal
	Gheorghe 90+3'		Constantinovici 13'; Buia 48'; Zanc 69'

18 June 2003 Leg 2	Oradea	3–1	Oțelul Galați	Stadionul Iuliu Bodola
	Vrăjitoarea 71', 81', 90+1'		Tănase 28'

== Attendances ==
Pos	Team	Total	High	Low	Average	Change
1	Politehnica Timișoara	324,000	40,000	6,000	21,600	n/a^{1}
2	Universitatea Craiova	280,000	40,000	4,000	18,666	n/a
3	Rapid București	157,000	20,000	3,000	10,466	n/a
4	Steaua București	142,250	24,000	250	9,483	n/a
5	UTA Arad	124,000	12,000	4,000	8,266	n/a^{1}
6	FCM Bacău	120,000	18,000	2,000	8,000	n/a
7	Oțelul Galați	94,000	12,000	3,000	6,266	n/a
8	Dinamo București	87,000	15,000	2,000	5,800	n/a
9	Farul Constanța	74,000	8,000	2,000	4,933	n/a
10	FC Brașov	71,500	12,000	1,000	4,766	n/a
11	Argeș Pitești	64,000	12,000	300	4,266	n/a
12	Național București	60,100	12,000	900	4,006	n/a^{2}
13	Ceahlăul Piatra Neamț	52,750	10,000	250	3,516	n/a
14	Gloria Bistrița	48,100	12,000	300	3,206	n/a
15	Astra Ploiești	44,000	10,000	500	2,933	n/a
16	Sportul Studențesc București	35,150	8,000	150	2,510	n/a
	League total	1,777,850	40,000	150	7,438	n/a

Updated to games played on 2 June 2019
Source: League matches: Divizia A 2002/2003
Notes:
1: Played last season in Divizia B.
2: Național București played 1 match out of their stadium.

== Top goalscorers ==
Position	Player	Club	Goals
1	Claudiu Răducanu	Steaua București	21
2	Ionel Dănciulescu	Dinamo București	16
3	Laurențiu Diniță	Sportul Studențesc	15
4	Cosmin Bărcăuan	Dinamo București	13
5	Sergiu Radu	Național București	12

== Champion squad ==
Rapid București

Goalkeepers: Emilian Dolha (22 / 0); Ionuț Curcă (4 / 0); Boban Savić (Serbia and Montenegro) (3 / 0); Răzvan Lucescu (1 / 0).
Defenders: Cornel Buta (3 / 0); Nicolae Constantin (3 / 0); Adrian Iencsi (27 / 4); Vasile Maftei (29 / 3); Camille Muzinga (Democratic Republic of the Congo) (2 / 0); Dănuț Perjă (20 / 3); Răzvan Raț (28 / 2); Ion Voicu (19 / 1).
Midfielders: Valentin Bădoi (30 / 7); Roberto Bisconti (Belgium) (8 / 0); Emmanuel Godfroid (Belgium) (24 / 5); Nicolae Grigore (15 / 0); Robert Ilyes (23 / 5); Claudiu Mircea Ionescu (1 / 0); Marius Măldărășanu (14 / 2); Dorin Pandele (1 / 0); Ioan Sabău (16 / 1); Claudiu Saghin (1 / 0); Constantin Schumacher (10 / 1); Florin Costin Șoavă (28 / 1).
Forwards: Florin Bratu (27 / 11); Henry Makinwa (Nigeria) (11 / 2); Daniel Niculae (28 / 6); Robert Niță (19 / 5).
(league appearances and goals listed in brackets)

Manager: Mircea Rednic.
