= 2007 Supercupa României =

- Event: 2007 Supercupa României
Dinamo București	Rapid București
Liga I	Cupa României
1	1
- Rapid won 6–5 on penalties
- Date: 25 July 2007
- Venue: Stadionul Naţional, Bucharest
- Man of the Match: (Romania) Dănuţ Coman
- Referee: Istvan Kovacs (Romania)
- Attendance: 30,000

The 2007 Supercupa României was the 10th edition of Romania's season opener cup competition. The match was played in Bucharest at Stadionul Naţional on 25 July 2007, and was contested between Liga I title holders, FC Dinamo București and Cupa României champions, FC Rapid București. The winner, after penalties, was Rapid.

== Match ==
=== Details ===
25 July 2007
20:45 EEST

Dinamo București	1–1 (a.e.t.)	Rapid București
Dănciulescu 116'	Report	Burdujan 109'
Penalties
Cristea (penalty scored); Chiacu (penalty scored); Ropotan (penalty scored); Niculescu (penalty scored); Dănciulescu (penalty scored); Pulhac (penalty missed)	5–6	(penalty scored) Maftei; (penalty scored) Constantin; (penalty scored) Stancu; (penalty scored) Dică; (penalty scored) Božović; (penalty scored) Burdujan

Stadionul Naţional, Bucharest
Attendance: 30,000
Referee: Istvan Kovacs (Romania)

Dinamo București	Rapid București

DINAMO BUCUREŞTI:
GK	1	(Romania) Bogdan Lobonţ
DF	16	(Ghana) George Blay
DF	4	(Romania) Cosmin Moţi	(yellow card) 2'
DF	26	(Romania) Ştefan Radu
DF	3	(Romania) Cristian Pulhac
MF	6	(Romania) Andrei Mărgăritescu		(substituted off) 79'
MF	13	(Romania) Ianis Zicu
MF	8	(France) Fabrice Fernandes		(substituted off) 73'
FW	15	(Romania) Florin Bratu		(substituted off) 61'
FW	10	(Romania) Ionel Dănciulescu (c)
FW	9	(Romania) Claudiu Niculescu	(yellow card) 42'
Substitutes:
MF	22	(Romania) Hristu Chiacu		(substituted in) 61'
MF	20	(Romania) Adrian Cristea		(substituted in) 73'
MF	25	(Romania) Adrian Ropotan		(substituted in) 79'
Manager:
(Romania) Mircea Rednic

RAPID BUCUREŞTI:
GK	1	(Romania) Dănuţ Coman
DF	21	(Romania) Cristian Săpunaru	(yellow card) 43'
DF	24	(Romania) Vasile Maftei (c)	(yellow card) 105'
DF	23	(Romania) Marius Constantin
DF	19	(Montenegro) Vladimir Božović
MF	17	(Romania) Marius Măldărăşanu
MF	15	(Romania) Costin Lazăr	(yellow card) 88'
MF	8	(Romania) Ştefan Grigorie	(substituted off) 46'
FW	7	(Brazil) Césinha	(substituted off) 78'
FW	9	(Romania) Ionuţ Mazilu
FW	29	(Romania) Mugurel Buga	(substituted off) 93'
Substitutes:
MF	25	(Romania) Romeo Stancu	(yellow card) 84'	(substituted in) 46'
FW	20	(Romania) Lucian Burdujan		(substituted in) 78'
MF	10	(Romania) Emil Dică		(substituted in) 93'
Manager:
(Italy) Cristiano Bergodi

MATCH OFFICIALS

- Assistant referees:
  - Cristian Nica
  - Aurel Oniţa
- Fourth official:
  - Aurelian Bogaciu

MAN OF THE MATCH

- (Romania) Dănuţ Coman

MATCH RULES

- 90 minutes.
- 30 minutes extra-time (15 minute intervals)
- Penalty shoot-out if scores level after extra time.
- Seven named substitutes
- Maximum of 3 substitutions.

== See also ==
- 2007–08 Liga I
- 2007–08 Cupa României
