= 2003 Supercupa României =

- Event: 2003 Supercupa României
Rapid București	Dinamo București
Divizia A	Cupa României
1	0
- Rapid won by a Golden goal
- Date: 2 August 2003
- Venue: Stadionul Naţional, Bucharest
- Referee: Marian Salomir (Romania)
- Attendance: 16,000

The 2003 Supercupa României was the 7th edition of Romania's season opener cup competition. The match was played in Bucharest at Stadionul Naţional on 2 August 2003, and was contested between Divizia A title holders, Rapid and Cupa României champions, Dinamo. Rapid won the trophy in extra time after a golden goal by substitute Robert Niţă.

== Match ==
=== Details ===
2 August 2003
20:00 EEST

Rapid București	1–0 (a.e.t.)	Dinamo București
Niţă 92'	Report

Stadionul Naţional, Bucharest
Attendance: 16,000
Referee: Marian Salomir (Romania)

Rapid București	Dinamo București

RAPID BUCUREŞTI:
GK	1	(Romania) Emilian Dolha
DF	5	(Romania) Adrian Iencsi (c)
DF	6	(Romania) Florin Şoavă
DF	7	(Romania) Dănuț Perjă
DF	2	(Romania) Sergiu Brujan	(yellow card) 13'
MF	4	(Romania) Ionuţ Luţu		(substituted off) 74'
MF	10	(Morocco) Noureddine Ziyati
MF	8	(Romania) Robert Ilyeş
MF	3	(Romania) Valeriu Bordeanu
FW	11	(Romania) Florin Bratu		(substituted off) 62'
FW	9	(Nigeria) Henry Makinwa		(substituted off) 46'
Substitutes:
DF	13	(Romania) Cornel Buta		(substituted in) 74'
FW	16	(Romania) Daniel Niculae		(substituted in) 46'
FW	17	(Romania) Robert Niţă		(substituted in) 62'
Manager:
(Romania) Mircea Rednic

DINAMO BUCUREŞTI:
GK	1	(Belgium) Grégory Delwarte
DF	3	(Nigeria) Samuel Okunowo
DF	6	(Romania) Ovidiu Burcă
DF	4	(France) Xavier Méride
DF	2	(Romania) Flavius Stoican	(substituted off) 68'
MF	7	(Romania) Dan Alexa
MF	8	(Romania) Florentin Petre (c)
MF	19	(Romania) Vlad Munteanu	(substituted off) 68'
MF	5	(Romania) Szabolcs Perenyi
FW	9	(Romania) Claudiu Niculescu
FW	10	(Romania) Ionel Dănciulescu
Substitutes:
MF	15	(Romania) Ştefan Grigorie	(substituted in) 68'
MF	13	(Romania) Ianis Zicu	(substituted in) 68'
––	––
Manager:
(Romania) Ioan Andone

MATCH OFFICIALS

- Assistant referees:
  - Dan Lăzărescu
  - Nicolae Marodin
- Fourth official:

MAN OF THE MATCH

MATCH RULES

- 90 minutes.
- 30 minutes extra-time (15-minute intervals)
- Penalty shoot-out if scores level after extra time.
- Seven named substitutes
- Maximum of three substitutions.

== See also ==
- 2003–04 Divizia A
- 2003–04 Cupa României
