= Răzvan Lucescu =

Romanian association football manager and former player (born 1969)

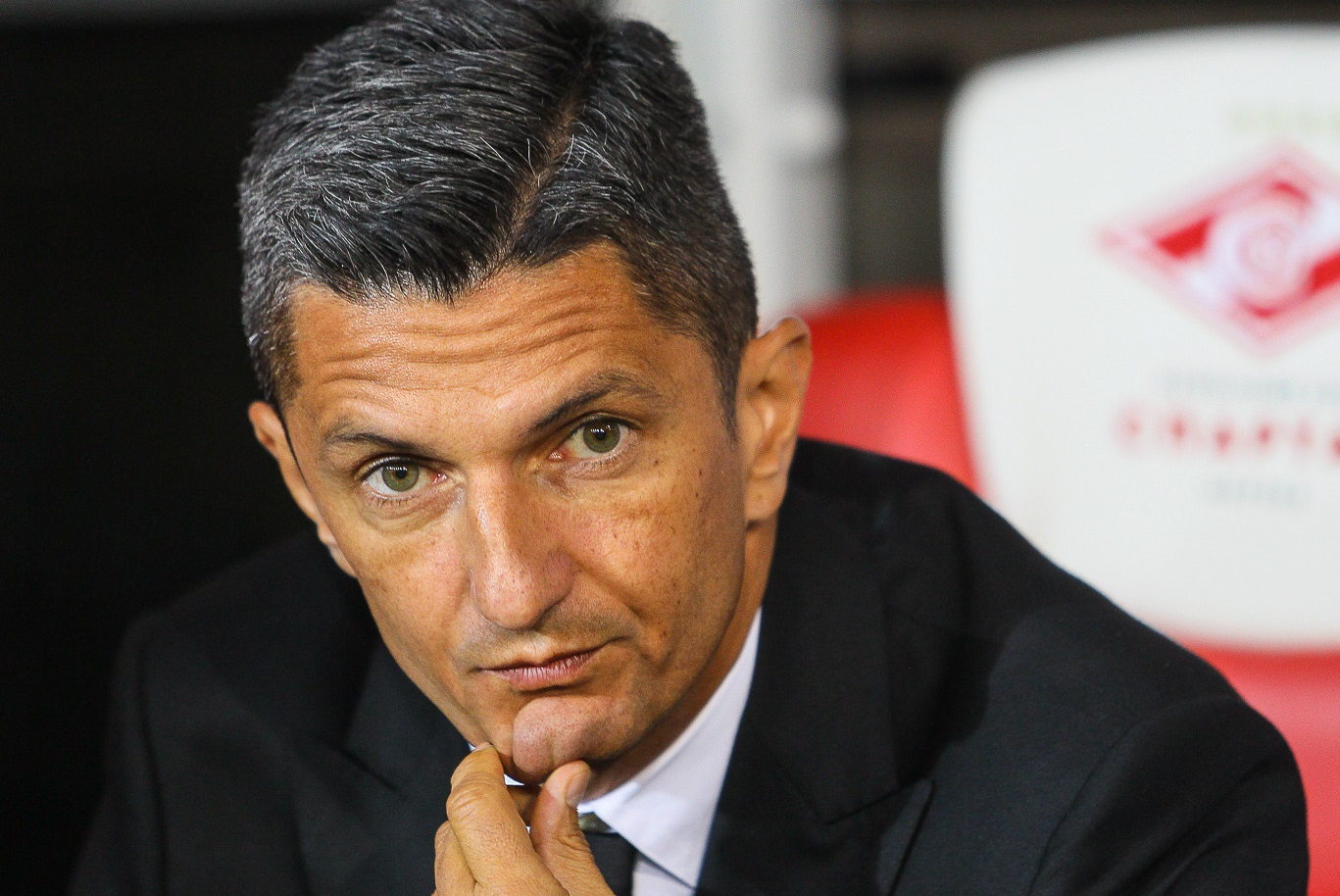
- Lucescu as PAOK manager in 2018

Personal information
- Date of birth: 17 February 1969 (age 57)
- Place of birth: Bucharest, Romania
- Height: 1.77 m (5 ft 10 in)
- Position: Goalkeeper

Team information
- Current team: Al Sadd (head coach)

Youth career
- 1981–1985: Dinamo București
- 1985–1987: Sportul Studențesc

Senior career*
Years	Team	Apps	(Gls)
1987–1992	Sportul Studențesc	24	(0)
1992–1993	Crema	3	(0)
1993–1996	Sportul Studențesc	81	(0)
1996–1997	Național București	31	(0)
1997–1998	Sportul Studențesc	31	(0)
1998–1999	Național București	23	(0)
2000	Brașov	13	(0)
2000–2001	Rapid București	26	(0)
2001–2002	Bacău	10	(0)
2002	Rapid București	1	(0)
Total		243	(0)

International career
1989	Romania U21	2	(0)
1998	Romania B	1	(0)

Managerial career
- 2004: Brașov
- 2004–2007: Rapid București
- 2007–2009: Brașov
- 2009–2011: Romania
- 2011–2012: Rapid București
- 2012–2014: El Jaish
- 2014: Petrolul Ploiești
- 2014–2017: Xanthi
- 2017–2019: PAOK
- 2019–2021: Al Hilal
- 2021–2026: PAOK
- 2026–: Al Sadd
- * Club domestic league appearances and goals

Răzvan Lucescu (Romanian pronunciation: [rəzˈvan luˈt͡ʃesku]; born 17 February 1969) is a Romanian professional football manager and former player who is the head coach of Qatar Stars League club Al Sadd.

As a player, he operated as a goalkeeper and spent most years of his career at Sportul Studențesc during three stints. Lucescu also represented Național București, Brașov, Rapid București and Bacău in his country, as well as Crema abroad. He won his only national title with Rapid in the 2002–03 campaign.

He returned to Brașov in 2004 for his first role as a manager, before moving to Rapid where he guided the team to the Cupa României in the 2005–06 and 2006–07 seasons. Between 2009 and 2011, Lucescu was in charge of the Romania national team. His other managerial honours include six domestic trophies with El Jaish, PAOK and Al Hilal combined. With the latter side, he also won the AFC Champions League in 2019.

== Playing career ==
Born in Bucharest, Lucescu made 243 appearances in the Divizia A for Sportul Studențesc, Național București, FC Brașov, Rapid București and FCM Bacău.

== Managerial career ==
=== Brașov ===
He began his coaching career with FC Brașov in the 2003–04 season spanning 15 matches in the first league.

=== Rapid București ===
In June 2004, he was named coach of Rapid București. In his first season, he qualified for the UEFA Cup, finishing third in the domestic league.

In the 2005–06 season, he had a dramatic start of the season, being dismissed for one night, before the owner of the club, George Copos, decided to take him back. Lucescu and his side managed to defeat teams such as Feyenoord, Shakhtar Donetsk (his father's team), Hertha Berlin and Hamburger SV, reaching to the quarter-finals of the UEFA Cup. Rapid was taken out by city rivals Steaua Bucharest after two draws. In the league, he finished as runners-up, after being sixth at the half of the season.

The 2006–07 season was not as good. Rapid got eliminated from the UEFA Cup group stages after four draws, finishing fourth. However, in 2007 Lucescu decided not to continue with Rapid, after a fallout with some of the supporters and several disagreements with the club owner. He opted to return to Braşov.

Răzvan won the Romanian Cup with Rapid in 2006 and 2007, both leading Rapid into the UEFA Cup.

=== Return to Brașov ===
Lucescu decided to start over and, instead of accepting to manage bigger clubs from abroad, he decided to coach Brașov, who relegated two years before and finished tenth in the last season of the second division. He didn't disappoint and won promotion from the first place, bringing Braşov back in the first league.

=== Romania national team ===
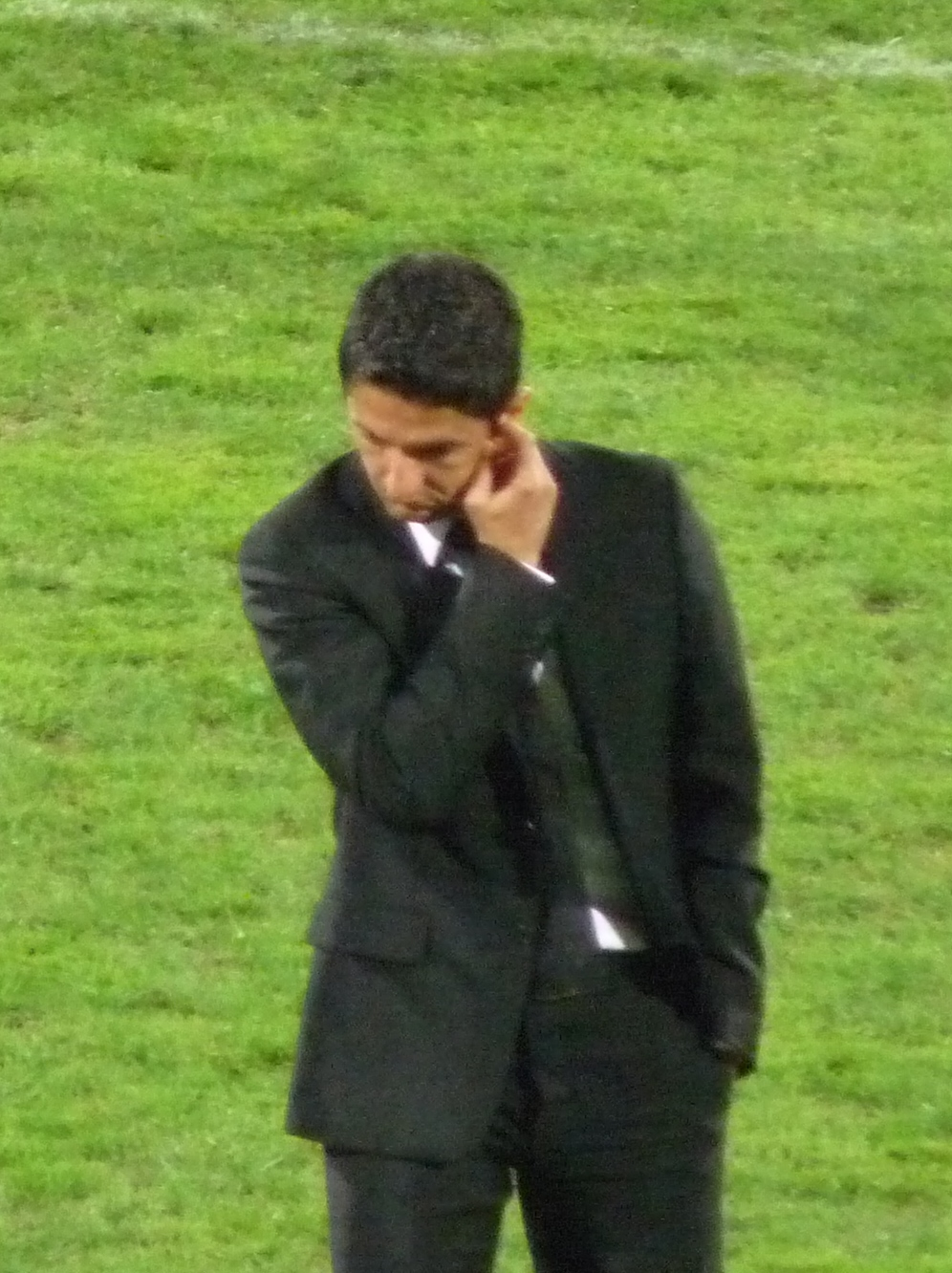
Lucescu in 2009

On 29 April 2009, he was appointed head coach and general manager of Romania, leaving Braşov after a ninth-place finish in the first division and replacing Victor Piţurcă in this position. After two years in control he gave up the national team, following the 3–0 victory over Bosnia and Herzegovina, leaving it with chances of qualifying to the UEFA Euro 2012.

=== Return to Rapid București ===
In June 2011, Lucescu returned to Rapid București for a second spell as coach. Lucescu's Rapid side defeated Polish champions Śląsk Wrocław 4–2 on aggregate in the play-off round to qualify for the UEFA Europa League group stage. The club finished fourth in Liga I and reached the finals of the 2011–12 Romanian Cup.

=== El Jaish ===
On 31 May 2012, he was appointed at the helm of Qatari side El Jaish on a two-year deal. In his first season in charge Lucescu won the 2012–13 Qatari Stars Cup and led his side into the knockout stages of the AFC Champions League. His contract with El Jaish was terminated in January 2014 and he was replaced by coach Nabil Maâloul who led the club to the runner-up spot in the Qatar Stars League.

=== Petrolul Ploiești ===
In March 2014, he was named the head coach of Liga I side Petrolul Ploiești replacing Cosmin Contra. He was sacked six months later, Petrolul finished third in the domestic league and were knocked out in the semi-finals by Astra Giurgiu in the Romanian Cup and also eliminated in the play-offs of the Europa League.

=== Xanthi ===
On 24 September 2014, Lucescu signed a one-year contract with Greek Super League club Xanthi. He guided them to their first Greek Cup final in their history. Lucescu went on to extend his contract with the Akrites for a further two seasons.

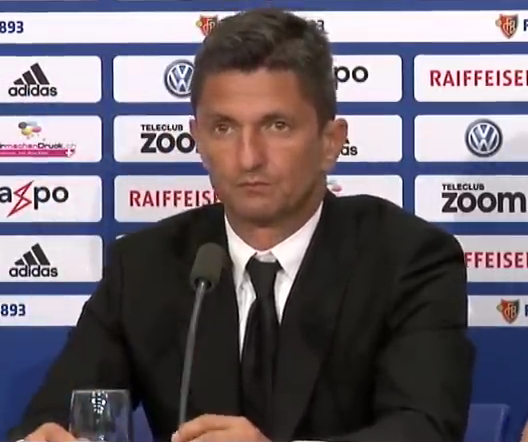
Lucescu during a press conference with PAOK in 2018.

=== PAOK ===
On 11 August 2017, Lucescu would return to the benches of Super League Greece as he signed a three-year contract with PAOK. His tenure at the club started against Östersunds for the play-off round of 2017–18 UEFA Europa League. PAOK went to win the first leg in Thessaloniki, 3–1, but a 0–2 defeat in Sweden in the second leg eliminated them from the competition, as they failed to reach the UEFA Europa League group stage for the first time in 5 years. Despite a bad start in the Super League he managed to build an impressive winning streak to be in first place in the league table until the derby with AEK Athens on 11 March, 2018 where in the 90th minute of the match Fernando Varela scores and makes it 1–0, the referee calls him offside and disallows the goal. This decision led to incidents in the match culminating of PAOK's president Ivan Savvidis storming the pitch and stopping the match at the expense of PAOK 0–3 and deducting three (3) points from the league table, something that contributed in AEK Athens eventually winning the Super League. On 12 May 2018, PAOK won 0–2 against AEK Athens and conquered the Greek Cup.

In the 2018–19 season, PAOK began their European adventure in the second qualifying round of the UEFA Champions League, eliminating Basel and Spartak Moscow, before losing in the play-offs against Benfica and dropping to the UEFA Europa League group stages. PAOK finished fourth in a group with Chelsea, BATE Borisov and MOL Vidi, only winning 4–1 against BATE in Barysaw and losing all the other matches.

Despite the early European exit, the team enjoyed a great domestic season. On 21 April 2019, PAOK won their third league title and their first in 34 years after beating Levadiakos at home with 5–0. Lucescu received wide praise from PAOK fans and became a major figure in the club after leading it to its most successful season by that point. Despite the departure of star player Aleksandar Prijović in January, Lucescu led his side to league triumph without a single defeat, a milestone last reached by Panathinaikos 65 years before, and finished the season with a record-breaking 80 points.

=== Al-Hilal ===
On 28 June 2019, Lucescu parted ways with PAOK after receiving an offer to manage Saudi Arabian club Al-Hilal. The club reportedly paid PAOK the manager's €2M release clause. Răzvan had rejected the proposal from the specific team in May, however he changed his mind after a strong disagreement with the president of PAOK Ivan Savvidis and his son Giorgos Savvidis who had different plans for the team from them, that Lucescu had. As a result, he judged that he had no reason to stay in the team if his own plans for the team were not accepted, and so he left taking advantage of the fact that Al Hilal again proposed to him. He brought the club to a third Asian Club Championship / AFC Champions League title and the first continental trophy in 17 years, after a 3–0 win on aggregate over Urawa Red Diamonds in the 2019 AFC Champions League final. He was dismissed after a 1–0 defeat against Damac in February 2021.

=== Return to PAOK ===
After two years in Saudi Arabia, Lucescu returned to PAOK for a second term, signing a three-year contract with a salary of €1.7 million without including the bonuses and became the highest paid coach in the history of PAOK. In the Super League, PAOK finished second, 19 points behind the champion Olympiacos, which they, however, eliminated in the semi-finals of the Greek Cup to find PAOK for the fifth time in six years in a cup final, where they suffered a 1–0 defeat by Panathinaikos; there were many protests for refereeing against PAOK. In the Europa Conference League, he managed to reach the quarter-finals of the tournament, where he was eliminated by Marseille there were also protests against refereeing against PAOK.

In the 2022–23 season, PAOK without the necessary transfer support charged to the team president Ivan Savvidis finished in fourth place in the league table, while in the Cup, they reached the final, where they were defeated 2–0 by AEK Athens. The only notable thing about the season was the emergence of Greek wonder kids such as Giannis Konstantelias and Kostas Koulierakis.

In the 2023–24 season, PAOK eliminated Beitar Jerusalem, Hajduk Split and Heart of Midlothian in succession to reach the UEFA Europa Conference League group stage. Then, in the group stage with Eintracht Frankfurt, Aberdeen and HJK, they finished first, qualifying for the round of 16, where they eliminated Dinamo Zagreb and made it to the quarter-finals. In the league, the double-header finished in first place in Super League however, they were forced to play in the play-offs with the six first teams of Super League. In the cup, PAOK successively eliminated Volos and Panserraikos; they then advanced to the semi-finals, where they played Panathinaikos, and were eliminated.

=== Al Sadd ===
On 5 July 2026, Lucescu was appointed head coach of Qatar Stars League champions Al Sadd on a two-year contract until 2028. He succeeded Roberto Mancini, who left the club after one season. The appointment marked his return to club football in Qatar, having previously managed El Jaish during the 2012–13 season.

== Personal life ==
Lucescu's father, Mircea, also coached the Romania national team and Rapid București, and was one of the most decorated managers of all time. His wife Ana-Maria Lucescu is a literature books translator from Greek, and the translator among others, of Dimitris Lyacos' novel Until the Victim Becomes our Own into Romanian.

== Managerial statistics ==
As of match played 22 October 2026

Managerial record by team and tenure
Team	Nat	From	To	Record								Ref.
Team	Nat	From	To	G	W	D	L	GF	GA	GD	Win %	Ref.
FC Brașov	(Romania)	5 February 2004	10 June 2004	15	5	3	7	20	15	+5	33.33	
Rapid București	(Romania)	10 June 2004	27 May 2007	133	74	37	22	227	110	+117	55.64	
FC Brașov	(Romania)	14 June 2007	11 June 2009	73	40	21	12	121	52	+69	54.79	
Romania	(Romania)	29 April 2009	4 June 2011	21	7	7	7	25	26	−1	33.33	
Rapid București	(Romania)	4 June 2011	31 May 2012	48	25	11	12	78	47	+31	52.08	
El Jaish	(Qatar)	31 May 2012	15 January 2014	68	39	9	20	112	67	+45	57.35	
Petrolul Ploiești	(Romania)	11 March 2014	16 September 2014	28	13	9	6	48	24	+24	46.43	
Xanthi	(Greece)	24 September 2014	11 June 2017	109	38	37	34	123	109	+14	34.86	
PAOK	(Greece)	11 August 2017	28 June 2019	92	68	12	12	194	61	+133	73.91	
Al-Hilal	(Saudi Arabia)	1 July 2019	14 February 2021	72	45	17	10	146	67	+79	62.50	
PAOK	(Greece)	26 May 2021	19 June 2026	191	104	45	42	336	184	+152	54.45	
Al Sadd	(Qatar)	5 July 2026	Present	10	6	0	4	29	19	+10	60.00	
Total				862	464	208	190	1,459	778	+681	53.83	

== Honours ==
=== Player ===
Național București

- Cupa României runner-up: 1996–97

Rapid București

- Divizia A: 2002–03

=== Manager ===
Rapid București

- Cupa României: 2005–06, 2006–07, runner-up: 2011–12
- Supercupa României runner-up: 2006

FC Brașov

- Liga II: 2007–08

El Jaish

- Qatari Stars Cup: 2012–13

Xanthi

- Greek Cup runner-up: 2014–15

PAOK

- Super League Greece: 2018–19, 2023–24
- Greek Cup: 2017–18, 2018–19 runner-up: 2021–22, 2022–23, 2025–26

Al-Hilal

- AFC Champions League: 2019
- Saudi Professional League: 2019–20
- Saudi King Cup: 2019–20

=== Individual ===
- Gazeta Sporturilor Romania Coach of the Year: 2018 2019, 2020 (joint with Cosmin Olăroiu),
- Gazeta Sporturilor Romania Coach of the Month: March 2022, December 2023, May 2024
- Super League Greece Manager of the Season: 2018–19, 2023–24
- Saudi Professional League Manager of the Month: September 2019, January 2020, February 2020, November 2020,
- IFFHS AFC Man Coach of the Year: 2020
