= 2002 Cupa României final =

- Event: 2001–02 Cupa României
Rapid București	Dinamo București
Divizia A	Divizia A
2	1
- Date: 5 June 2002
- Venue: Stadionul Naţional, Bucharest
- Referee: Cristian Balaj (Romania)
- Attendance: 40,000

The 2002 Cupa României final was the 64th final of Romania's most prestigious cup competition. The final was played at the Stadionul Național in Bucharest on 5 June 2002 and was contested between Divizia A sides Rapid București and Dinamo București. The cup was won by Rapid.

== Route to the final ==
FC Rapid București

Round of 32	Politehnica Timișoara	1–3	Rapid București
Round of 16	Rapid București	2–0	Argeș Pitești
Quarter-finals	Bihor Oradea	0–5	Rapid București
Semi-finals 1st Leg	Astra Ploiești	2–2	Rapid București
Semi-finals 2nd Leg	Rapid București	0–0 (a.g.)	Astra Ploiești

FC Dinamo București

Round of 32	Electromagnetica București	2–3	Dinamo București
Round of 16	Dinamo București	6–0	Sportul Studențesc
Quarter-finals	FC Brașov	0–0 a.e.t. (2–3) pen.	Dinamo București
Semi-finals 1st Leg	Steaua București	0–1	Dinamo București
Semi-finals 2nd Leg	Dinamo București	3–1	Steaua București

== Match details ==
5 June 2002
21:00 EEST

Rapid București	2–1	Dinamo București
Măldărășanu 74'; Pancu 85'	Report	Dănciulescu 93'

Stadionul Național, Bucharest
Attendance: 40,000
Referee: Cristian Balaj (Romania)

Rapid București	Dinamo București

RAPID BUCUREȘTI:
GK	12	(Romania) Bogdan Stelea
DF	3	(Romania) Adrian Iencsi (c)	(red card) 38'
DF	4	(Romania) Vasile Maftei	(yellow card) 33'	(substituted off) 84'
DF	2	(Romania) Nicolae Stanciu
MF	8	(Romania) Ioan Sabău
MF	7	(Romania) Marius Măldărășanu
MF	6	(Romania) Florin Șoavă	(yellow card) 80'
MF	10	(Romania) Robert Ilyeș
MF	5	(Romania) Răzvan Raț
FW	11	(Romania) Daniel Pancu		(substituted off) 87'
FW	9	(Romania) Florin Bratu		(substituted off) 68'
Substitutes:
DF	13	(Romania) Ion Voicu		(substituted in) 84'
MF	15	(Romania) Dennis Șerban		(substituted in) 68'
FW	14	(Romania) Marius Șumudică		(substituted in) 87'
Manager:
(Romania) Mircea Rednic

DINAMO BUCUREȘTI:
GK	1	(Romania) Bogdan Lobonț
DF	2	(Romania) Giani Kiriță (c)
DF	6	(Romania) Bogdan Onuț
DF	4	(Romania) Sorin Iodi
MF	5	(Romania) Mugur Bolohan	(yellow card) 24'
MF	8	(Romania) Florin Pârvu
MF	7	(Romania) Ovidiu Stîngă	(yellow card) 29'	(substituted off) 55'
MF	18	(Romania) Vlad Munteanu		(substituted off) 65'
MF	3	(Romania) Iosif Tâlvan		(substituted off) 87'
FW	9	(Romania) Claudiu Niculescu	(red card) 38'
FW	20	(Romania) Claudiu Drăgan
Substitutes:
MF	17	(Romania) Constantin Ilie		(substituted in) 87'
MF	18	(Romania) Florentin Petre		(substituted in) 55'
FW	10	(Romania) Ionel Dănciulescu		(substituted in) 65'
Manager:
(Romania) Cornel Dinu

MATCH OFFICIALS

- Assistant referees:
  - (Romania) Ioan Onicaș
  - (Romania) Cristian Nica
- Fourth official:

MAN OF THE MATCH

MATCH RULES

- 90 minutes.
- 30 minutes extra-time (15-minute intervals)
- Penalty shoot-out if scores level after extra time.
- Seven named substitutes
- Maximum of 3 substitutions.
