= Derbiul Bucureștiului =

Football rivalry in Bucharest, Romania

- Location: Bucharest, Romania
- Teams: FC Rapid București; FCSB
- First meeting: ASA București (FCSB) 0–1 CFR (Rapid) (4 December 1947)
- Latest meeting: FCSB 0–0 Rapid (27 October 2024)
- Next meeting: FCSB v. Rapid; 2024–25 Liga I (to be announced)
- Stadiums: Stadionul Steaua/Steaua Stadium/Arena Națională (Steaua/FCSB); Giulești Stadium (Rapid)

Statistics
- Total meetings: 147
- Most wins: Steaua/FCSB (62)
- All-time series (Liga 1, Romania only): Steaua/FCSB: 62; Drawn: 47; Rapid: 38
- Largest victory: Rapid 2–8 Steaua; Divizia A (3 May 1989)

The Derbiul Bucureștiului (English: Bucharest derby), also known as Derbi de București and Big Bucharest derby, is the football local derby in Bucharest, Romania, between FCSB and FC Rapid București. It is considered one of the fiercest intra-city derbies in the country, alongside other major local derbies, Cluj derby and Eternal derby, one of the greatest and hotly contested derbies in Europe.

== History ==
The two clubs have played each other over 130 times, beginning with Rapid's 1–0 victory on November 4, 1947 (at the time Rapid was named "CFR", and Steaua "ASA București"). Several matches throughout the years between Steaua and Rapid have ended in serious clashes between fans.

The two teams are notable for their dominance of Romanian football, alongside Dinamo. Even though Rapid only won 3 Romanian football championships to Steaua/FCSB's 27, they both dominate the Romanian Cup (23 times for Steaua/FCSB and 13 times for Rapid) and the Romanian Supercup (7 times for Steaua/FCSB and 4 times for Rapid).

They also have great performances in club competitions organised by UEFA among other Romanian football team. Steaua won the European Cup in 1986, was runner-up in the same competition in 1989 after reaching the semi-finals in 1988. In 2006, Steaua and Rapid faced one another in the quarter-finals of the UEFA Cup, Steaua winning over two legs on the away goals rule. Moreover, Steaua won the UEFA Super Cup in 1986 and was defeated in the Intercontinental Cup by River Plate the same year. On the other hand, Rapid won the Balkans Cup 2 times in a row in 1964 and 1966 and reached the quarter-finals of the UEFA Cup Winners' Cup in 1973. The rivalry also extends to other sports.

== Honours ==
Competition	Steaua	Rapid
Liga I / Divizia A	28	3
Liga II / Divizia B	0	6
Liga III	0	1
Liga IV	0	1
Cupa României	24	13
Cupa Ligii	2	1
Supercupa României	8	4
UEFA Champions League / European Cup	1	0
UEFA Super Cup / European Super Cup	1	0
Balkans Cup	0	2
Total	64	31

== Statistics and records ==
- Largest win: Rapid București 2–8 Steaua București on 3 May 1989
- Largest home win (championship): Steaua București 5–0 Rapid București on 19 June 1988
- Largest away win (championship): Rapid București 2–8 Steaua București on 3 May 1989
- The most goals in one match (all competitions): 10 in Rapid București 2–8 Steaua București on 3 May 1989, Divizia A
- The most goals in one match (championship): 10 in Rapid București 2–8 Steaua București on 3 May 1989
- Steaua's largest win: Rapid București 2–8 Steaua București on 3 May 1989
- Steaua's longest series undefeated (all competitions): 23 matches (18 wins, 5 draws) between 22 May 1977 and 19 March 1994
- Steaua's longest series undefeated (championship): 20 matches (16 wins, 4 draws) between 22 May 1977 and 19 March 1994
- Rapid Bucharest's greatest win(championship): 5–1, 18 April 2010; 27 May 2023

=== Head to head results ===
Competition	GP	WS	D	WR	GSTE	GRAP
Liga I	126	46	45	35	186	156
Cupa României	18	14	2	2	43	19
Supercupa României	3	2	0	1	5	5
Cupa Ligii	1	1	0	0	2	1
UEFA Cup	2	0	2	0	1	1
TOTAL	150	63	49	38	237	182

GP: Games played
WS: Wins for Steaua
D: Draws
WR: Wins for Rapid
GSTE: Steaua goals
GRAP: Rapid goals
As of 27 April 2025

== All matches ==
=== Liga I ===
CSCA/CCA/Steaua/FCSB win Draw Rapid București win

League
Season	Division	Tier	CSCA/CCA/Steaua/FCSB vs Rapid București				Rapid București vs CSCA/CCA/Steaua/FCSB			
Season	Division	Tier	Date	Venue	Score	Atten.	Date	Venue	Score	Atten.
1947–48	Divizia A	1	4 December 1947	Republicii	0–1	–	4 April 1948	Giulești	2–0	–
1948–49	Divizia A	1	26 February 1949	Republicii	1–1	–	21 August 1948	Giulești	5–2	
1950	Divizia A	1	3 June 1950	Republicii	1–0	–	28 October 1950	Giulești	2–4	–
1951	Divizia A	1	6 October 1951	Republicii	0–1	–	27 May 1951	Giulești	1–2	–
1953	Divizia A	1	3 May 1953	Republicii	1–0	–	17 October 1953	Giulești	1–1	–
1954	Divizia A	1	26 September 1954	Republicii	3–0	–	4 April 1954	Giulești	2–3	–
1956	Divizia A	1	8 April 1956	Republicii	1–1	–	30 August 1956	Giulești	2–4	–
1957–58	Divizia A	1	15 December 1957	Republicii	1–3	–	4 May 1958	Giulești	0–0	–
1958–59	Divizia A	1	29 March 1959	Republicii	4–0	–	12 November 1958	Giulești	2–3	–
1959–60	Divizia A	1	10 April 1960	Republicii	1–1	–	27 September 1959	Giulești	2–5	–
1960–61	Divizia A	1	2 April 1961	Republicii	0–1	–	18 September 1960	Giulești	3–2	–
1961–62	Divizia A	1	16 November 1961	Republicii	1–2	–	10 June 1962	Giulești	2–1	–
1962–63	Divizia A	1	23 September 1962	Republicii	3–3	–	21 April 1963	Giulești	0–2	–
1963–64	Divizia A	1	29 March 1964	Republicii	0–2	–	8 September 1963	Giulești	3–4	–
1964–65	Divizia A	1	21 April 1965	Republicii	0–1	–	20 December 1964	Giulești	0–0	–
1965–66	Divizia A	1	5 June 1966	Republicii	3–2	–	31 October 1965	Giulești	2–0	–
1966–67	Divizia A	1	28 May 1967	Republicii	0–0	–	9 November 1966	Giulești	3–0	–
1967–68	Divizia A	1	3 September 1967	Republicii	2–0	–	24 March 1968	Giulești	3–1	–
1968–69	Divizia A	1	1 June 1969	Republicii	2–0	–	2 November 1968	Giulești	2–1	–
1969–70	Divizia A	1	28 June 1970	Republicii	1–1	–	18 October 1969	Giulești	3–3	–
1970–71	Divizia A	1	20 September 1970	Republicii	1–1	–	3 April 1971	Giulești	0–0	–
1971–72	Divizia A	1	24 October 1971	Republicii	2–1	–	4 May 1972	Giulești	2–1	–
1972–73	Divizia A	1	8 April 1973	Republicii	0–0	–	23 September 1972	Giulești	1–1	–
1973–74	Divizia A	1	2 September 1973	Republicii	3–2	–	31 March 1974	Giulești	2–0	–
1975–76	Divizia A	1	24 August 1975	Steaua	0–0	–	14 March 1976	Giulești	0–3	–
1976–77	Divizia A	1	22 May 1977	Steaua	4–1	–	17 October 1976	Giulești	2–0	–
1983–84	Divizia A	1	29 April 1984	Steaua	2–1	–	4 December 1983	Giulești	1–1	–
1984–85	Divizia A	1	23 September 1984	Steaua	2–0	–	16 March 1985	Giulești	0–2	–
1985–86	Divizia A	1	13 April 1986	Steaua	3–1	–	24 September 1985	Giulești	1–2	–
1986–87	Divizia A	1	22 April 1987	Steaua	3–1	–	5 October 1986	Giulești	1–1	–
1987–88	Divizia A	1	19 June 1988	Steaua	5–0	–	13 December 1987	Giulești	0–4	–
1988–89	Divizia A	1	12 October 1988	Steaua	2–0	–	3 May 1989	Giulești	2–8	–
1990–91	Divizia A	1	7 October 1990	Steaua	0–0	–	28 April 1991	Giulești	0–2	–
1991–92	Divizia A	1	8 March 1992	Steaua	3–0	–	25 August 1991	Giulești	1–2	–
1992–93	Divizia A	1	6 December 1992	Steaua	3–0	–	16 June 1993	Giulești	1–1	–
1993–94	Divizia A	1	6 October 1993	Steaua	0–0	–	19 March 1994	Giulești	2–1	–
1994–95	Divizia A	1	6 November 1994	Steaua	1–1	–	14 May 1995	Giulești	1–1	–
1995–96	Divizia A	1	1 October 1995	Steaua	3–0	–	9 March 1996	Giulești	1–1	–
1996–97	Divizia A	1	16 March 1997	Steaua	3–1	–	25 August 1996	Giulești	0–2	–
1997–98	Divizia A	1	5 October 1997	Steaua	2–2	–	1 April 1998	Giulești	1–1	–
1998–99	Divizia A	1	4 April 1999	Steaua	1–1	–	30 August 1998	Giulești	3–0	–
1999–00	Divizia A	1	7 August 1999	Steaua	1–3	–	5 March 2000	Giulești	2–2	–
2000–01	Divizia A	1	29 October 2000	Steaua	0–0	–	16 May 2001	Giulești	1–1	–
2001–02	Divizia A	1	4 May 2002	Steaua	2–1	–	21 October 2001	Giulești	3–0	–
2002–03	Divizia A	1	27 October 2002	Steaua	2–1	24,000	26 April 2003	Giulești	1–2	18,000
2003–04	Divizia A	1	21 March 2004	Steaua	3–3	25,000	18 August 2003	Național	1–1	20,000
2004–05	Divizia A	1	14 April 2005	Steaua	0–0	20,000	8 August 2004	Giulești	2–1	15,000
2005–06	Divizia A	1	30 April 2006	Național	0–2	17,000	23 October 2005	Giulești	0–0	16,000
2006–07	Liga I	1	17 September 2006	Național	1–1	30,000	1 April 2007	Giulești	2–3	10,000
2007–08	Liga I	1	16 September 2007	Steaua	0–0	22,000	20 March 2008	Giulești	0–3	10,000
2008–09	Liga I	1	15 May 2009	Steaua	1–2	15,000	9 November 2008	Giulești	0–0	10,000
2009–10	Liga I	1	25 October 2009	Steaua	1–1	0	18 April 2010	Giulești	5–1	11,700
2010–11	Liga I	1	4 May 2011	Steaua	0–1	8,000	8 November 2010	Giulești	0–0	10,500
2011–12	Liga I	1	24 October 2011	Arena Națională	0–0	41,432	29 April 2012	Giulești	1–1	10,000
2012–13	Liga I	1	24 September 2012	Arena Națională	1–0	42,876	14 April 2013	Giulești	1–1	7,624
2014–15	Liga I	1	22 February 2015	Steaua	0–1	9,437	26 July 2014	Giulești	1–3	3,624
2021–22	Liga I	1	15 December 2021	Arena Națională	3–1	20,157	15 August 2021	Arena Națională	1–0	35,500
2022–23	Liga I	1	6 November 2022	Arena Națională	3–1	31,233	24 July 2022	Superbet Arena	2–0	13,800
2022–23	Liga I	1	27 May 2023	Arena Naţională	1–5	19,247	23 April 2023	Superbet Arena	1–0	12,600
2023–24	Liga I	1	5 November 2023	Arena Naţională	1–2	40,563	9 March 2024	Arena Naţională	0–4	43,283
2023–24	Liga I	1	20 April 2024	Arena Naţională	2–2	45,143	19 May 2024	Superbet Arena	2–0	6,133
2024–25	Liga I	1	27 October 2024	Arena Naţională	0–0	40,287	2 March 2025	Arena Naţională	0–0	30,823
2024–25	Liga I	1	16 March 2025	Arena Naţională	3–3	26,385	27 April 2025	Superbet Arena	1–2	12,600

=== Romanian Cup (Cupa României) ===
#	Date	Level	Home team	Away team	Score	Goals (home)	Goals (away)
1	11 December 1949	Quarter-finals	CSCA	CFR	2–1		
2	15 November 1953	Semi-finals	CCA	Locomotiva	1–0		—
3	28 November 1954	Quarter-finals	CCA	Locomotiva	1–0		—
4	11 December 1955	Semi-finals	CCA	Locomotiva	4–0		—
5	22 October 1961	Semi-finals	Rapid	CCA	2–0		—
6	8 July 1962	Final	Steaua	Rapid	5–1	Mateianu (11), Voinea (40), Constantin (47, 64), Raksi (85)	Ozon (15)
7	27 June 1963	Round of 16	Steaua	Rapid	7–2		
8	1 July 1964	Quarter-finals	Steaua	Rapid	2–1		
9	13 July 1966	Semi-finals	Steaua	Rapid	3–0		—
10	21 May 1969	Quarter-finals	Steaua	Rapid	3–1		
11	25 June 1975	Semi-finals	Rapid	Steaua	1–1 (pen.)	Râşniţă (?)	Sătmăreanu (?)
12	23 June 1976	Quarter-finals	Steaua	Rapid	2–0		—
13	26 February 1986	Round of 16	Steaua	Rapid	4–2	Belodedici (15), Bălan (76), Majearu (78), Bölöni (85)	Țîră (48), Cioacă (81)
14	16 June 1987	Quarter-finals	Steaua	Rapid	1–0		—
15	25 June 1989	Semi-finals	Steaua	Rapid	3–2	Pițurcă (42, 48), I. Stan (86)	Minoiu (31), Damaschin II (52)
16	15 March 1995	Round of 16	Rapid	Steaua	4–1	I. Chiriță (50, 74, 75), Constantinovici (57)	I. Stan (30 p.)
17	16 June 1999	Final	Steaua	Rapid	2–2 (pen.)	Ciocoiu (68), Belodedici (90)	Barbu (71, 81)
18	11 November 2010	Quarter-finals	Rapid	Steaua	0–1	—	Surdu (49)

=== Romanian SuperCup (Supercupa României) ===
#	Date	Home team	Away team	Score	Goals (home)	Goals (away)
1	9 September 1998	Steaua	Rapid	4–0 (2–0)	Șerban (19), Roșu (27, 69), Dumitrescu (87)	—
2	7 October 1999	Rapid	Steaua	5–0 (2–0)	Radu (3, 69, 72), Măldărășanu (25, 89)	—
3	22 July 2006	Steaua	Rapid	1–0 (0–0)	Oprița (90)	—

=== League Cup (Cupa Ligii) ===
#	Date	Level	Home team	Score	Away team	Goals (home)	Goals (away)
1	19 July 2014	Round of 16	Rapid	1–2 (1–1)	Steaua	Selagea (24)	Keșerü (8, 49 pen.)

=== UEFA Cup ===
#	Date	Level	Home team	Score	Away team	Goals (home)	Goals (away)
1	30 March 2006	Quarter-finals, 1st leg	Rapid	1–1 (0–1)	Steaua	Moldovan (50)	Nicoliță (5)
2	6 April 2006	Quarter-finals, 2nd leg	Steaua	0–0 (0–0)	Rapid	—	—

== Head-to-head ranking in Liga I ==
P.	49	50	51	52	53	54	55	56	58	59	60	61	62	63	64	65	66	67	68	69	70	71	72	73	74	75	76	77	78	79	80	81	82	83	84	85	86	87	88	89	90	91	92	93	94	95	96	97	98	99	00	01	02	03	04	05	06	07	08	09	10	11	12	13	14	15	16	17	18	19	20	21	22	23	24	25	26
1			1	1	1			1			1	1						1	1								1		1							1	1	1	1	1				1	1	1	1	1	1	1		1		1		1	1							1	1	1									1	1	
2	2	2				2			2					2	2	2	2				2	2						2			2				2						2	2	2						2		2			2	2		2	2	2								2	2	2	2		2	2	2			
3										3		3			3	3				3	3	3								3																	3			3	3		3		3	3			3				3														
4								4		4										4												4												4	4	4						4	4					4			4	4	4														
5		5			5								5					5								5								5																												5									5			5		5	5
6	6						6																	6	6								6																											6															6		
7																																											7																		7																7
8									8					8																							8											8												8				8													
9													9						9				9																																																		9				
10											10												10																																																						
11			11																																	11						11																																			
12						12											12																																																												
13																								13											13				13																																						
14																											14											14																																							
15																																																																													
16																									16			16																																						16											
17																																								17																																					
Liga II
1				1			1																			1								1							1																										1										
2																															2		2																																2							2					
3																																3																																													
4																													4																																																
6																														6																																									6						
Liga III
1																																																																						1							
Liga IV
1																																																																					1								
Liga V
1																																																																				1									

Steaua București/FCSB
Rapid București
- Total: Steaua București/FCSB finished higher 61 times, Rapid București finished higher 16 times, and the clubs finished in the same position 0 times.

== See also ==
- Eternal derby (Romania)
- Steaua București football records dispute
- List of sports rivalries
