= 1999 Cupa României final =

- Event: 1998–99 Cupa României
Steaua București	Rapid București
Divizia A	Divizia A
2	2
- Steaua won 4–2 on penalties
- Date: 16 June 1999
- Venue: Stadionul Naţional, Bucharest
- Referee: Marc Batta (France)
- Attendance: 50,000

The 1999 Cupa României final was the 61st final of Romania's most prestigious cup competition. The final was played at the Stadionul Naţional in Bucharest on 16 June 1999 and was contested between Divizia A sides Steaua București and Rapid București. The cup was won by Steaua on penalties.

== Route to the final ==
FC Steaua București

Round of 32	Midia Năvodari	0–3	Steaua București
Round of 16	Steaua București	3–0	Universitatea Cluj
Quarter-finals 1st Leg	Steaua București	5–1	Petrolul Ploieşti
Quarter-finals 2nd Leg	Petrolul Ploieşti	1–1	Steaua București
Semi-finals 1st Leg	Dinamo București	1–2	Steaua București
Semi-finals 2nd Leg	Steaua București	3–1	Dinamo București

FC Rapid București

Round of 32	Diplomatic Focşani	1–4	Rapid București
Round of 16	Rapid București	3–0	Cimentul Fieni
Quarter-finals 1st Leg	Gloria Bistriţa	1–1	Rapid București
Quarter-finals 2nd Leg	Rapid București	2–1	Gloria Bistriţa
Semi-finals 1st Leg	Rapid București	1–0	FCM Bacău
Semi-finals 2nd Leg	FCM Bacău	2–1 (a.g.)	Rapid București

== Match details ==
16 June 1999
21:00 EEST

Steaua București	2–2 (a.e.t.)	Rapid București
Ciocoiu 68'; Belodedici 90'	Report	Barbu 71', 81'
Penalties
Roşu (penalty scored); Militaru (penalty scored); Trică (penalty scored); Lincar (penalty scored)	4–2	(penalty scored) Şumudică; (penalty scored) Iencsi; (penalty missed) Bundea; (penalty missed) Pancu

Stadionul Naţional, Bucharest
Attendance: 50,000
Referee: Marc Batta (France)

Steaua București	Rapid București

STEAUA BUCUREŞTI:
GK	1	(Romania) Zoltan Ritli
RD	11	(Romania) Marius Baciu
CD	4	(Romania) Adrian Matei
CD	5	(Romania) Miodrag Belodedici
LD	18	(Romania) Mihăiţă Szekely
CM	15	(Albania) Albert Duro	(substituted off) 84'
CM	20	(Romania) Erik Lincar
LW	16	(Romania) Laurenţiu Roşu
SS	19	(Romania) Ionel Dănciulescu	(substituted off) 51'
RW	7	(Romania) Marius Lăcătuş (c)
CF	9	(Romania) Cristian Ciocoiu	(substituted off) 100'
Substitutes:
MF	10	(Romania) Ionuţ Luţu	(substituted in) 51'
MF	8	(Romania) Damian Militaru	(substituted in) 84'
MF	17	(Romania) Eugen Trică	(substituted in) 100'
Manager:
(Romania) Emerich Jenei

RAPID BUCUREŞTI:
GK	1	(Romania) Bogdan Lobonţ
RD	7	(Romania) Mugur Bolohan
CD	2	(Romania) Nicolae Stanciu (c)
CD	16	(Romania) Mircea Rednic
CD	23	(Romania) Adrian Iencsi
LD	4	(Romania) Ştefan Nanu
CM	17	(Romania) Marius Măldărăşanu
RM	9	(Romania) Ioan Sabău
LM	10	(Romania) Dănuţ Lupu	(substituted off) 72'
FW	8	(Romania) Constantin Barbu	(substituted off) 88'
FW	20	(Romania) Ionel Ganea	(substituted off) 80'
Substitutes:
MF	18	(Romania) Zeno Bundea	(substituted in) 88'
FW	19	(Romania) Daniel Pancu	(substituted in) 72'
FW	14	(Romania) Marius Şumudică	(substituted in) 80'
Manager:
(Romania) Mircea Lucescu

MATCH OFFICIALS

- Assistant referees:
  - (France) Pierre Ufrasi
  - (France) Alain Gourdet
- Fourth official:

MAN OF THE MATCH

MATCH RULES

- 90 minutes.
- 30 minutes extra-time (15 minute intervals)
- Penalty shoot-out if scores level after extra time.
- Seven named substitutes
- Maximum of 3 substitutions.

== See also ==
- Derbiul Bucureștiului
