= Valeriu Răchită =

Romanian footballer and manager

Personal information
- Date of birth: 30 May 1970 (age 56)
- Place of birth: Boldești-Scăeni, Romania
- Height: 1.86 m (6 ft 1 in)
- Position: Centre-back

Youth career
- 1982–1985: Petrolul Ploiești

Senior career*
Years	Team	Apps	(Gls)
1985–1989	Metalul Plopeni		
1989–1990	Steaua București	2	(0)
1990–1996	Petrolul Ploiești	169	(18)
1996–1998	Steaua București	58	(5)
1998–1999	FC Onești	10	(0)
1999	Ankaragücü	5	(0)
2000	Farul Constanța	3	(0)
2000–2002	Litex Lovech	42	(3)
2002–2004	Steaua București	43	(4)
2004	FC Universitatea Craiova	1	(0)
Total		333	(31)

Managerial career
- 2005–2006: Petrolul Ploiești
- 2006: Al Ain (assistant)
- 2007–2009: CSM Ploiești
- 2009: Romania B
- 2009–2012: Petrolul Ploiești
- 2014: Romania (assistant)
- 2014–2015: Al-Ittihad (assistant)
- 2017–2018: Sportul Snagov
- 2019: ACS Poli Timișoara
- 2019: Sportul Snagov
- * Club domestic league appearances and goals

Valeriu "Vivi" Răchită (born 30 May 1970) is a Romanian former footballer and manager.

== Club career ==
Răchită was born on 30 May 1970 in Boldești-Scăeni, Romania and began playing junior-level football at the age of 12 at Petrolul Ploiești. He started playing football at senior level in 1985 at Divizia B club Metalul Plopeni. The team suffered relegation at the end of his first season, but he stayed with the club, helping it gain promotion back after one year. In 1989, Răchită joined Steaua București where he was teammates with Gheorghe Hagi, Marius Lăcătuș, Ștefan Iovan, Adrian Bumbescu, Nicolae Ungureanu, Ilie Dumitrescu and Dan Petrescu. There, he made his Divizia A debut on 13 May 1990 when coach Anghel Iordănescu sent him in the 77th minute to replace Daniel Minea in a 4–2 victory against FCM Bacău. Subsequently, Răchită went to play for Petrolul Ploiești where he scored a personal record of five goals during the 1993–94 season. He helped the club win the 1994–95 Cupa României by captaining the side under coach Marin Ion for the duration of the final against Rapid București, which culminated in a penalty shoot-out victory where Răchită netted the decisive last spot kick. Then he made four appearances in the 1995–96 Cup Winners' Cup campaign as The Yellow Wolves got past Wrexham in the qualifying round, being eliminated by Rapid Wien in the following one.

Răchită made a comeback to Steaua in the middle of the 1996–97 season, helping them win the title by playing 19 matches and scoring once under coach Dumitru Dumitriu. They also won the Cupa României, where Răchită played the full 90 minutes in the 4–2 win over Național București in the final. Afterwards, he helped the club get past CSKA Sofia in the 1997–98 Champions League first qualifying round, but they were defeated by Paris Saint-Germain in the following round. Then they continued their European campaign in the UEFA Cup, where Steaua eliminated Fenerbahçe and Bastia, being defeated in the round of 16 by Aston Villa. During the same season, Răchită made 27 league appearances and scored three goals under coach Mihai Stoichiță, as the team won another title. He started the next season by winning the 1998 Supercupa României, as Stoichiță used him the entire match in the 4–0 win over rivals Rapid București. Subsequently, Răchită played four matches in the 1998–99 Champions League qualifying rounds, helping his side get past Flora in the first round, but they got eliminated in the following round by Panathinaikos against whom he scored two goals. In the middle of that season, he left Steaua to go to FC Onești.

Răchită had his first experience abroad by playing for Turkish side Ankaragücü. He made his Süper Lig debut on 16 October 1999 under coach Gheorghe Mulțescu in a 2–1 home loss to Göztepe, totaling five matches in the competition. Subsequently, Răchită returned to Romania and played only three games in the second half of the 1999–2000 season for Farul Constanța. In 2000, he had his second experience abroad, when he went to Litex Lovech in Bulgaria where he was teammates with fellow Romanians Florin Prunea and Bogdan Pătrașcu. He helped the team win the 2000-01 Bulgarian Cup, playing under coach Ferario Spasov in the 1–0 win over Velbazhd in the final. Subsequently, Răchită played eight matches in the 2001–02 UEFA Cup campaign, as Litex eliminated Longford Town, Inter Slovnaft Bratislava and Union Berlin, being defeated in the third round by AEK Athens against whom he scored a goal. Afterwards, he went for a third spell at Steaua. He played six games in the 2003–04 UEFA Cup, as The Military Men got past Neman Grodno and Southampton before they were eliminated in the second round by Liverpool. In the first half of the 2004–05 season, coach Victor Pițurcă used him in one match in which he scored one goal. However, he was transferred in the middle of the season to FC Universitatea Craiova, but Steaua still managed to win the title at the end of the season without him. Răchită made his last Divizia A appearance on 12 March 2005 in Universitatea's 2–1 home loss to Argeș Pitești, totaling 286 matches with 27 goals in the competition and 34 games with three goals in European competitions. "U" Craiova suffered relegation at the end of that season.

== International career ==
Răchită represented Romania's junior teams at international level in the late 1980s.

== Managerial career ==
In September 2005, Răchită began his coaching career, as he was named head coach of Divizia B club Petrolul Ploiești after the fourth round of the season, replacing Vasile Cosarek. The spell lasted until May 2006, a period in which he handed a debut to 16-year-old Constantin Budescu in senior football. Subsequently, in the same year, he worked as an assistant coach to Anghel Iordănescu at Al Ain. In the summer of 2007, Răchită went to coach CSM Ploiești, helping them gain promotion from the third league to the second at the end of the 2007–08 season. He was dismissed in January 2009, being replaced by Marius Șumudică. In 2009, he led Romania B in a 2–0 friendly loss to Portugal B.

In June 2009, Răchită took over Petrolul once again, managing to gain first-league promotion at the end of the 2010–11 season. He left the club in March 2012. Between 2014 and 2015, Răchita served as an assistant to Victor Pițurcă at the Romania national team and Saudi Arabian club Al-Ittihad, respectively. In the 2017–18 Liga II season, he led Sportul Snagov to a 10th place finish. In December 2018, Răchită was appointed as the head coach of ACS Poli Timișoara, but could not save the team from relegation to the third league at the end of the season. He returned to Sportul Snagov, but after four losses in the first four rounds of the 2019–20 season, Răchită withdrew from his coaching position.

== Personal life ==
Răchită's father was also a footballer and captain at Petrolistul Boldești.

== Managerial statistics ==
Managerial record by team and tenure in the league championship
Team	From	To	Record						
Team	From	To	G	W	D	L	GF	GA	Win %
Petrolul Ploiești	13 September 2005	27 May 2006	26	15	5	6	41	23	57.69
CSM Ploiești	25 July 2007	5 January 2009	49	40	5	4	112	38	81.63
Petrolul Ploiești	30 June 2009	28 March 2012	85	40	25	20	126	75	47.06
Sportul Snagov	1 July 2017	30 June 2018	36	12	9	15	45	37	33.33
ACS Poli Timișoara	15 January 2019	30 June 2019	17	5	4	8	14	22	29.41
Sportul Snagov	16 July 2019	31 August 2019	4	0	0	4	1	15	0.00
Total			217	112	48	57	339	210	51.61

== Honours ==
=== Player ===
Metalul Plopeni

- Divizia C: 1986–87

Petrolul Ploiești

- Cupa României: 1994–95

Steaua București

- Divizia A: 1996–97, 1997–98, 2004–05
- Cupa României: 1996–97
- Supercupa României: 1998

Litex Lovech

- Bulgarian Cup: 2000–01

=== Manager ===
CSM Ploiești

- Liga III: 2007–08

Petrolul Ploiești

- Liga II: 2010–11
