= Florin Tene =

Romanian footballer and coach

Personal information
- Full name: Florin Alexandru Tene
- Date of birth: 10 November 1968 (age 57)
- Place of birth: Bucharest, Romania
- Height: 1.80 m (5 ft 11 in)
- Position: Goalkeeper

Team information
- Current team: Voluntari (GK coach)

Youth career
- 1975–1987: Dinamo București

Senior career*
Years	Team	Apps	(Gls)
1986–1987	Dinamo București	1	(0)
1987–1988	Autobuzul București		
1988–1990	Flacăra Moreni	45	(0)
1990–1991	Gloria Bistrița	44	(0)
1991–1992	Dinamo București	30	(0)
1992–1994	Gloria Bistrița	49	(1)
1994–1995	Dinamo București	21	(0)
1995–1997	Rapid București	44	(0)
1997–1998	Karabükspor	9	(0)
1998–1999	Steaua București	13	(0)
1999	Rocar București	10	(0)
2000	Argeș Pitești	13	(0)
2000–2001	Dinamo București	5	(0)
Total		284	(1)

International career
1992–1996	Romania	6	(0)

Managerial career
- 2001–2002: Sportul Studențesc (GK coach)
- 2002–2012: Romania U–21 (GK coach)
- 2005–2006: Dinamo II București (GK coach)
- 2007–2009: Progresul București (GK coach)
- 2009–2010: CS Otopeni
- 2010–2011: Sportul Studențesc
- 2012–2013: Petrolul Ploiești (GK coach)
- 2013: Dinamo București (GK coach)
- 2013–2014: Steaua București (GK coach)
- 2014–2015: Al Hilal (GK coach)
- 2015: Litex Lovech (GK coach)
- 2015–2017: Steaua București (GK coach)
- 2017–2018: Al Wahda (GK coach)
- 2019–2020: Al-Wasl (GK coach)
- 2021: Al Ahli (GK coach)
- 2021–2022: Universitatea Craiova (GK coach)
- 2022–2023: Neftchi Baku (GK coach)
- 2023–2024: Gaziantep (GK coach)
- 2025–: Voluntari (GK coach)
- * Club domestic league appearances and goals

Florin Alexandru Tene (born 10 November 1968) is a Romanian former professional footballer who played as a goalkeeper, currently goalkeeping coach at Liga I club Voluntari.

== Club career ==
Tene was born on 10 November 1968 in Bucharest, Romania and began playing junior-level football at local club Dinamo under the guidance of coaches Ioan Timar, Iosif Varga and Ilie Balaci. Until his youth period ended in 1987 he was teammates with fellow goalkeepers Bogdan Stelea, Florin Prunea and Răzvan Lucescu. He made his Divizia A debut, playing for The Red Dogs on 18 June 1987 under coach Mircea Lucescu in a 5–4 loss to Sportul Studențesc București. That would remain his only appearance for the team, afterwards leaving to play for Autobuzul București in Divizia B. After one season spent at Autobuzul, Tene returned to Divizia A football at Flacăra Moreni. There, Tene spent two seasons, earning a fourth place in the first one that granted them qualification to the 1989–90 UEFA Cup, where he appeared in both legs of the 4–1 loss on aggregate to FC Porto in the first round.

In 1990 he joined Gloria Bistrița and during the 1991–92 season he was transferred back to Dinamo, where coach Florin Halagian used him in 21 league games until the end of the season as the team won the title undefeated. In the following season, Tene played all four games in the 1992–93 Champions League campaign, helping them eliminate Kuusysi Lahti in the first round of the 1992–93 Champions League. Dinamo faced Olympique Marseille in the second round, where they drew 0–0 in the first leg but lost the subsequent game with 2–0, the French ultimately winning the competition. In the middle of that season, Tene returned to play for Gloria. There, in the following season he helped the club win the 1993–94 Cupa României by playing five games in the campaign, including keeping a clean sheet under coach Constantin Cârstea in the 1–0 victory against Universitatea Craiova in the final. In the same season, he scored the only goal of his career from a penalty kick in a 5–0 victory against Sportul Studențesc.

In 1994, Tene went for a third spell at Dinamo, and then in the middle of the 1995–96 season he switched teams again, this time spending one and a half years at Rapid București. Subsequently, he had his only experience outside Romania, playing nine games in the 1997–98 1.Lig for Karabükspor in Turkey. Tene marked his Turkish league debut on 31 August 1997 with a clean sheet, having been brought on at halftime by coach Nenad Bijedić to replace Şevki Ekşi in the 1–0 home win over Ankaragücü. He returned to Romania at Steaua București. In one season with The Military Men, Tene won two trophies, including one where he kept a clean sheet under coach Mihai Stoichiță in the 4–0 victory against Rapid in the 1998 Supercupa României. Additionally, he made two appearances in the victorious 1998–99 Cupa României campaign, but without playing in the final. Tene played in the first half of the 1999–2000 Divizia A season at Rocar București and the second at Argeș Pitești. In the following season he went for a fourth spell at Dinamo where he made his last five Divizia A appearances, totaling 275 matches with one goal scored in the competition and 15 games in European competitions.

== International career ==
Tene played six friendly games for Romania, making his debut under coach Cornel Dinu on 26 August 1992 in a 2–0 victory against Mexico. He was selected by coach Anghel Iordănescu to be part of Romania's Euro 1996 final tournament squad, but he was not used in any games. In the same year he played his last international match on 14 August in a 2–0 win over Israel.

For representing his country at Euro 1996, Tene was decorated by President of Romania Traian Băsescu on 25 March 2008 with the Ordinul "Meritul Sportiv" – (The Medal "The Sportive Merit") class III.

== Managerial career ==
After he ended his playing career, Tene worked mostly as a goalkeeper coach for various teams, having only two spells as head coach at CS Otopeni and Sportul Studențesc. In 2013, he joined Laurențiu Reghecampf's staff, working with teams such as Steaua București, Al Hilal, Litex Lovech, Al Wahda and Neftchi Baku.

== Playing statistics ==
Romania
Year	Apps	Goals
1992	1	0
1993	2	0
1994	0	0
1995	0	0
1996	3	0
Total	6	0

== Honours ==
Dinamo București

- Divizia A: 1991–92

Gloria Bistriţa

- Cupa României: 1993–94

Steaua București

- Cupa României: 1998–99
- Supercupa României: 1998
