= 1998 Supercupa României =

- Event: 1998 Supercupa României
Steaua București	Rapid București
Divizia A	Cupa României
4	0
- Date: 9 September 1998 (19:30)
- Venue: Stadionul Naţional, Bucharest
- Referee: Aron Huzu (Sibiu) – Nicolae Grigorescu (Timișoara), Patritiu Abrudan (Cluj)
- Attendance: 35.000

The 1998 Supercupa României was the third edition of Romania's season opener cup competition. The match was played in Bucharest at Stadionul Naţional on 9 September 1998, and was contested between Divizia A title holders, Steaua București and Cupa României champions, Rapid București. The winner was Steaua București.

== Match ==
9 September 1998
19:30

Steaua București	4–0	Rapid București
Dennis Șerban 19'; Laurențiu Roșu 27', 69'; Ilie Dumitrescu 87'	(Report)

Stadionul Național
Attendance: 35.000
Referee: Aron Huzu (Sibiu)

Steaua București	Rapid București

STEAUA BUCUREȘTI:
P	1	(Romania) Florin Tene
F	2	(Romania) Laurențiu Reghecampf	(yellow card) 72'
FC	6	(Romania) Valeriu Răchită	(yellow card) 68'
FS	3	(Romania) Iulian Miu	(yellow card) 63'
F	4	(Romania) Adrian Matei	(yellow card) 74'
F	11	(Romania) Marius Baciu
MO	20	(Romania) Erik Lincar	(substituted off) 80'
MO	10	(Romania) Dennis Șerban	(substituted off) 79'
A	24	(Romania) Ilie Dumitrescu	(yellow card) 65'
A	16	(Romania) Laurențiu Roșu
A	7	(Romania) Marius Lăcătuș	(yellow card) 14'	(substituted off) 78'
Reserves:
A	9	(Romania) Cristian Ciocoiu	(substituted in) 78'
MD	8	(Romania) Damian Militaru	(substituted in) 79'
M	25	(Romania) Marius Coporan	(substituted in) 80'
Coach:
(Romania) Mihai Stoichiță

RAPID BUCUREȘTI:
P	1	(Romania) Bogdan Lobonț
FD	2	(Romania) Nicolae Stanciu
FC	4	(Romania) Ștefan Nanu
FC	16	(Romania) Mircea Rednic
FS	13	(Romania) Cristian Dulca	(substituted off) 81'
M	7	(Romania) Mugur Bolohan
M	29	(Romania) Dorel Mutică	(yellow card) 36'
M	17	(Romania) Marius Măldărășanu	(yellow card) 85'
M	18	(Romania) Zeno Bundea
A	14	(Romania) Marius Șumudică	(substituted off) 50'
A	19	(Romania) Daniel Pancu	(yellow card) 21'	(substituted off) 43'
Reserves:
A	6	(Romania) Ovidiu Maier	(substituted in) 43'	(yellow card) 56'
A	29	(Romania) Sergiu Radu	(substituted in) 50'
F	4	(Romania) Mario Bugeanu	(substituted in) 81'
Coach:
(Romania) Mircea Lucescu

MATCH OFFICIALS

- Assistant referees:
  - Nicolae Grigorescu (Timișoara)
  - Patrițiu Abrudan (Cluj-Napoca)
- Fourth official:

MAN OF THE MATCH

MATCH RULES

- 90 minutes.
- 30 minutes extra-time (15 minute intervals)
- Penalty shoot-out if scores level after extra time.
- Seven named substitutes
- Maximum of three substitutions.

== See also ==
- Derbiul Bucureștiului
- 1998–99 Divizia A
- 1998–99 Cupa României
