= Ion Ionuț Luțu =

Romanian footballer

Ionuț Luțu
Personal information
- Full name: Ion Ionuț Luțu
- Date of birth: 3 August 1975 (age 51)
- Place of birth: Slatina, Olt County, Romania
- Height: 1.68 m (5 ft 6 in)
- Position: Midfielder

Senior career*
Years	Team	Apps	(Gls)
1993–1996	Progresul București	62	(6)
1996–1999	Universitatea Craiova	64	(29)
1998	→ Galatasaray (loan)	3	(0)
1999–2000	Steaua București	36	(3)
2000	Suwon Samsung Bluewings	19	(2)
2000–2001	Progresul București	8	(0)
2001–2002	Suwon Samsung Bluewings	18	(4)
2002–2003	Universitatea Craiova	26	(7)
2003	Rapid București	7	(0)
2004	Apollon Limassol	4	(1)
2004–2005	Universitatea Craiova	35	(3)
2005–2006	Kairat	20	(4)
2007–2008	Universitatea Craiova	17	(2)
2008	Zhetysu	8	(1)
2009	Pandurii Targu Jiu	7	(0)
2009	Jiul Petroşani	8	(1)
2010	Alro Slatina		
2010–2011	Al-Jazeera Amman		
Total		342	(63)

International career
1993	Romania U18	4	(0)
1994–1998	Romania U21	27	(8)
1996	Romania U23	3	(0)
1997	Romania B	3	(0)
1999	Romania	1	(0)
- * Club domestic league appearances and goals as of 2009-06-11

Ion Ionuț Luțu (born 3 August 1975) is a Romanian former professional footballer who played as a midfielder. He was compared to Gheorghe Hagi, being nicknamed "the Little Hagi" or "Hagi-Luțu". He was known for his fine dribbling and technique, as well as spectacular finishing, but also for his inconsistency.

== International career ==
Ionuț Luțu played his only game for Romania on 3 March 1999 when coach Victor Pițurcă introduced him in the 61st minute to replace Laurențiu Roșu in a friendly which ended with a 2–0 victory against Estonia.

== Honours ==
Galatasaray

- Turkish First League: 1997–98

Steaua București

- Cupa României: 1998–99

Suwon Samsung Bluewings

- AFC Champions League: 2000–01, 2001–02
- Asian Super Cup: 2002
- Korean FA Cup: 2002
- Korean Super Cup: 2000
- Korean League Cup: 2000, 2001

Rapid București

- Romanian Supercup: 2003

Alro Slatina

- Liga III: 2009–10
