= Constantin Barbu =

Romanian footballer

Jean Barbu
Personal information
- Date of birth: 16 May 1971 (age 55)
- Place of birth: Galați, Romania
- Height: 1.75 m (5 ft 9 in)
- Position: Attacking midfielder

Team information
- Current team: Argeș Pitești (sporting counselor)

Youth career
- CSȘ Galați
- 1989–1991: CS Aripi Pitești

Senior career*
Years	Team	Apps	(Gls)
1991–1992	Dacia Pitești		
1992–1997	Argeș Pitești	152	(61)
1997–1998	Samsung Bluewings	5	(2)
1998	→ Argeș Pitești (loan)	29	(28)
1999	Rapid București	14	(9)
2000–2002	Numancia	53	(8)
2001	→ Rapid București (loan)	9	(5)
2002–2003	Argeș Pitești	1	(0)
2003–2004	Dacia Mioveni	17	(8)
Total		280	(121)

International career
1997–1998	Romania	3	(2)
- * Club domestic league appearances and goals

Constantin "Jean" Barbu (born 16 May 1971) is a Romanian retired professional footballer who played mainly as an attacking midfielder.

== Club career ==
=== Early career and Argeș Pitești ===
Barbu, nicknamed "Cobra", was born on 16 May 1971 in Galați, Romania and began playing football at CSȘ Galați. In 1989, he went to Piteşti to participate in a football trial, where he was one of the six children chosen from a total of 1,600. He began playing senior-level football at Dacia Pitești, moving to Divizia B club Argeș Pitești in 1992. He helped them earn promotion to the first league at the end of the 1993–94 season. Barbu made his Divizia A debut under coach Marian Bondrea on 20 August 1994, scoring with a header past goalkeeper Dumitru Stângaciu to help Argeș earn a 3–1 victory against Steaua București. From 1997 onwards, he formed an offensive partnership with Adrian Mutu.

=== Samsung Bluewings and Argeș Pitești ===
In September 1997, after scoring a hat-trick in a 4–2 away win over Chindia Târgoviște, Barbu was transferred from Argeș to Samsung Bluewings for a $1.3 million fee. There, he was teammates with fellow Romanians Pavel Badea and Cosmin Olăroiu. However, Barbu spent less than six months at the club, scoring two goals in five K League 1 matches, before being loaned back to Argeș for one year. He scored 21 goals for Argeș during the 1997–98 season, which made him the season's top-scorer alongside Gloria Bistrița's Vasile Oană, despite missing several games because of his time in Asia. During the 1998–99 UEFA Cup, Barbu played six games and scored four goals—including two each against Dinamo Baku and İstanbulspor to help Argeș advance through the qualifying rounds—before the team was defeated by Celta Vigo in the first round.

=== Rapid București ===
Midway through the 1998–99 season, Barbu was transferred from Samsung Bluewings to Rapid București for $500,000. He helped the capital club win the Divizia A title with eight goals in 11 matches. The team also reached the 1999 Cupa României final, where he played as a starter under coach Mircea Lucescu, scoring a brace in the loss to rivals Steaua. Subsequently, he played in both legs and scored once in the 5–4 aggregate loss to Skonto Riga in the 1999–2000 Champions League second qualifying round.

=== Numancia and Rapid București ===
For the 1999–2000 season, Barbu moved to Spain and joined Numancia, which paid a $1.2 million fee to Rapid for his transfer. There, he became teammates with Romanian Gabriel Popescu. He made his La Liga debut on 22 August 1999, when coach Andoni Goikoetxea used him as a starter in a 1–0 win over Real Valladolid. Barbu netted his first goal in the competition on 12 December in a 3–3 draw against Real Zaragoza, and one week later he scored once again in a 2–1 victory against Racing Santander. He also scored in victories over Real Betis, Atlético Madrid, and Espanyol, as well as in a draw against Deportivo Alavés. Those six goals in his 34 appearances helped the Soria side avoid relegation. During his second year —which he finished on loan at Rapid— he made eight goalless appearances and was joined by compatriot Laurențiu Roșu, but Numancia was ultimately relegated. Barbu played only 11 matches and scored two goals during the 2001–02 Segunda División; his season was cut short by a serious injury when Gerhard Poschner broke Barbu's leg during a victory against Polideportivo Ejido, a match in which Barbu had netted a double.

=== Argeș Pitești and Dacia Mioveni ===
Barbu returned to Argeș, where he had a conflict with coach Ion Moldovan. Because of that, he made a single Divizia A appearance —which was also his last— on 8 March 2003 in a 2–0 loss to FC Brașov, totaling 144 matches with 84 goals in the competition. He ended his career after playing 17 matches and scoring eight goals for Dacia Mioveni during the 2003–04 Divizia B season.

== International career ==
Barbu won three caps and scored twice for Romania. He made his debut on 6 September 1997, when coach Anghel Iordănescu introduced him at halftime to replace Gheorghe Craioveanu, and he went on to score once in the 8–1 win over Liechtenstein in the 1998 World Cup qualifiers. His following appearance was in a 4–0 victory against Iceland during the same qualifiers, where he won a penalty that Gheorghe Hagi converted to become Romania's all-time top scorer. In his last appearance for the national team, Barbu scored a goal in a 2–1 friendly victory against Greece. He was close to being part of the 1998 World Cup final tournament squad, but eventually Radu Niculescu was preferred in his place.

== Personal life ==
His son, Cătălin, is also a footballer who started his career at Argeș Pitești.

== Career statistics ==
=== International ===
Appearances and goals by national team and year
National team	Year	Apps	Goals
Romania	1997	2	1
Romania	1998	1	1
Total		3	2

Scores and results list Romania's goal tally first, score column indicates score after each Barbu goal.

List of international goals scored by Constantin Barbu
No.	Date	Venue	Opponent	Score	Result	Competition
1	6 September 1997	Sportpark, Eschen, Liechtenstein	Liechtenstein	7–0	8–1	1998 World Cup qualification
2	8 April 1998	Stadionul Steaua, Bucharest, Romania	Greece	2–0	2–1	Friendly

== Honours ==
Dacia Pitești

- Divizia C: 1991–92

Argeș Pitești

- Divizia B: 1993–94

Rapid București

- Divizia A: 1998–99
- Cupa României runner-up: 1998–99

Individual

- Divizia A top-scorer: 1997–98 (joint with Vasile Oană)
