= Dennis Șerban =

Romanian footballer

Dennis Şerban
Personal information
- Full name: Dennis Georgian Şerban
- Date of birth: 5 January 1976 (age 50)
- Place of birth: Bucharest, Romania
- Height: 1.73 m (5 ft 8 in)
- Position: Attacking midfielder

Youth career
- –1994: Farul Constanţa

Senior career*
Years	Team	Apps	(Gls)
1994–1996	Farul Constanţa	44	(6)
1994	→ Portul Constanţa (loan)	7	(1)
1996–1998	Steaua București	62	(15)
1998–2002	Valencia	14	(1)
1999–2000	→ Villarreal (loan)	13	(4)
2000–2001	→ Elche (loan)	35	(11)
2002	→ Rapid București (loan)	12	(2)
2002–2003	Córdoba	21	(4)
2003	Poli Ejido	10	(1)
2004	Petrolul Ploieşti	8	(1)
2004	Dinamo București	3	(0)
2005–2006	AEL	37	(1)
2006–2007	Dinamo București	7	(2)
Total		273	(49)

International career
1996–2001	Romania	13	(1)

Managerial career
- 2007: FC Ploieşti
- 2007: Progresul București
- 2010: Farul Constanţa (technical director)
- * Club domestic league appearances and goals

Dennis Georgian Şerban (born 5 January 1976) is a Romanian former professional footballer who played as an attacking midfielder.

== Playing career ==
Şerban played for FC Farul Constanţa and Portul Constanţa before joining the squad of Steaua București in 1996. A very talented playmaker, Şerban immediately became a very important part of the team which won the Romanian championship in 1997 and 1998 and played in the UEFA Champions League.

In 1999, he was signed by La Liga club Valencia. After two years at Valencia in which he only played 11 games, Şerban is loaned to Villarreal, in Spain's La Liga, and from there to Elche. At Elche he had a good period, playing 35 games and scoring 11 goals during the full season, and as a result he is called back by Valencia only to be released after few weeks and sent to Rapid București.

In 2002, he returned to Spain to play for Córdoba and then Polideportivo Ejido but as soon as he was released by Valencia from his contract, he returned to Romania to join Petrolul Ploieşti and then Dinamo București.

January 2005 found Şerban playing for AEL in the Greek second division. His club won promotion and, in 2006, he continued playing for Larissa, in the Greek first division, having a productive year with 27 appearances and 1 goal.

In August 2006, Şerban was signed again by Dinamo București. He was dismissed by coach Mircea Rednic in the early days of February 2007. Shortly after this, he started coaching Astra Ploiești and later Farul Constanţa.

== International career ==
Şerban won 13 caps for the Romania national side, scoring once in a 2–1 win over Yugoslavia.

== Career statistics ==
=== International ===
National team	Year	Apps	Goals
Romania
Romania	1996	1	0
Romania	1997	2	0
Romania	1998	6	0
Romania	1999	1	0
Romania	2000	1	1
Romania	2001	2	0
Total		13	1

Scores and results list Romania's goal tally first, score column indicates score after each Șerban goal.

List of international goals scored by Cătălin Munteanu
No.	Date	Venue	Cap	Opponent	Score	Result	Competition
1	15 November 2000	Stadionul Steaua, Bucharest, Romania	11	FR Yugoslavia	1–0	2–1	Friendly

== Honours ==
Steaua București

- Divizia A: 1996–97, 1997–98
- Cupa României: 1996–97
- Supercupa României: 1998

Valencia

- Copa del Rey: 1998–99
- Supercopa de España: 1999

Rapid București

- Cupa României: 2001–02

AEL

- Beta Ethniki: 2004–05
