= Vasile Oană =

Romanian footballer

Ion Vasile Oană (born 23 July 1972 in Târgu Lăpuş) is a Romanian former professional footballer who played as a forward. Playing for Gloria Bistriţa, he was the top goalscorer of 1997–98 Divizia A alongside Constantin Barbu with 21 goals each. He scored 32 goals in over 100 matches in Liga I. Oană also played abroad in Turkey at Ankaragücü and Maccabi Kiryat Gat in Israel. He coached Liga IV team Someşul Ulmeni, and now he coaches one of the FC Baia Mare junior teams.
