= Adrian Matei =

Romanian footballer

Personal information
- Date of birth: 29 February 1968 (age 58)
- Place of birth: Bucharest, Romania
- Height: 1.85 m (6 ft 1 in)
- Position: Centre-back

Youth career
- –1986: Rapid București

Senior career*
| Years | Team | Apps | (Gls) |
| 1986–1988 | Rapid București | 54 | (0) |
| 1988–1989 | Victoria București | 30 | (0) |
| 1989–1993 | Dinamo București | 79 | (2) |
| 1994 | Sportul Studențesc | 12 | (2) |
| 1994–1996 | Rapid București | 65 | (4) |
| 1997–1999 | Steaua București | 65 | (3) |
| 1999–2002 | Național București | 63 | (1) |
| Total | | 368 | (12) |

International career
| 1995 | Romania | 2 | (0) |

Managerial career
- 2004: FC Vaslui
- 2004–2006: Minerul Lupeni
- 2006: UFC Chitila
- 2006–2007: Rocar București
- 2007–2008: FCM Târgoviște
- 2008–2009: Rocar București
- 2009: Știința Bacău
- 2009–2010: Luceafărul Oradea
- 2012–2013: Metaloglobus București
- 2013: Berceni
- 2016: Unirea Tărlungeni
- 2017–2019: Carmen București
- 2019–2021: Rapid București U19
- 2021–2022: Rapid București (assistant)
- 2022–2023: Mioveni (assistant)
- * Club domestic league appearances and goals

Adrian Matei (born 29 February 1968) is a former Romanian football player.

Matei is one of the few footballers that played for the three great squads in Bucharest, Rapid, Dinamo and Steaua.

After he ended his playing career, Matei became a football manager but also embraced a television pundit career, working for Sport.ro. Besides football, Matei owns a restaurant in Bucharest.

== Honours ==
=== Player ===
Dinamo București

- Divizia A: 1989–90, 1991–92
- Cupa României: 1989–90

Steaua București

- Divizia A: 1996–97, 1997–98
- Cupa României: 1996–97, 1998–99
- Supercupa României: 1998

=== Coach ===
Minerul Lupeni

- Divizia C: 2004–05

ACS Berceni

- Liga III: 2012–13

Carmen București

- Liga IV – Bucharest: 2018–19
