= Damian Militaru =

Romanian footballer and manager

Personal information
- Date of birth: 19 December 1967 (age 58)
- Place of birth: Râmnicu Sărat, Romania
- Height: 1.74 m (5 ft 9 in)
- Position: Midfielder

Team information
- Current team: Jiul Petroșani (technical director)

Youth career
- Metalul Râmnicu Sărat
- Retezatul Hațeg

Senior career*
Years	Team	Apps	(Gls)
1990–1993	Jiul Petroșani	32	(7)
1993–1994	Dinamo București	25	(6)
1994–1999	Steaua București	139	(21)
1999	Shinnik Yaroslavl	6	(0)
1999–2000	Electroputere Craiova	11	(4)
2000–2007	Jiul Petroșani	69	(9)
Total		282	(47)

International career
1993	Romania B	4	(0)

Managerial career
- 2011–2015: Jiul Petroșani (assistant)
- 2017: Șirineasa (assistant)
- 2018–2020: Jiul Petroșani
- 2020–2022: Jiul Petroșani (assistant)
- 2022–: Jiul Petroșani (technical director)
- * Club domestic league appearances and goals

Damian Militaru (born 19 December 1967) is a Romanian professional football coach and a former player. He is the technical director of Jiul Petroșani.

== Honours ==
Steaua București

- Divizia A: 1994–95, 1995–96, 1996–97, 1997–98
- Cupa României: 1995–96, 1996–97, 1998–99
- Supercupa României: 1994, 1995, 1998
