= Marius Lăcătuș =

Romanian footballer (born 1964)

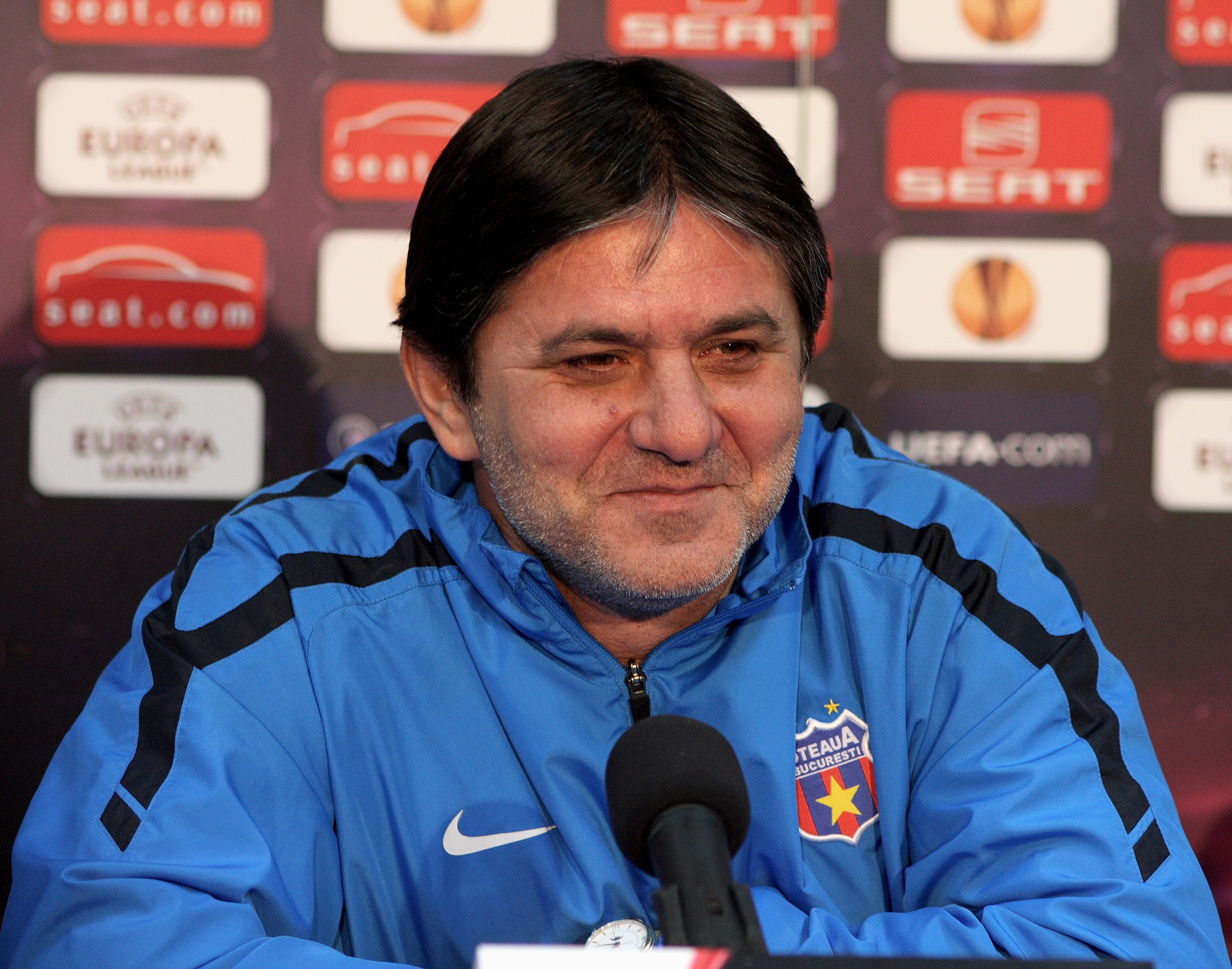
- Lăcătuș in 2010

Personal information
- Full name: Marius Mihai Lăcătuș
- Date of birth: 5 April 1964 (age 62)
- Place of birth: Brașov, Romania
- Height: 1.81 m (5 ft 11 in)
- Positions: Forward; midfielder

Youth career
- 1977–1980: FCM Brașov

Senior career*
Years	Team	Apps	(Gls)
1980–1983	FCM Brașov	48	(5)
1983–1990	Steaua București	200	(59)
1990–1991	Fiorentina	21	(3)
1991–1993	Oviedo	51	(7)
1993–1999	Steaua București	157	(39)
2000	Național București	12	(0)
Total		489	(113)

International career
1982–1983	Romania U21	6	(1)
1984	Romania Olympic	3	(0)
1984–1998	Romania	83	(13)
1997	Europe XI	1	(1)

Managerial career
- 1997–2000: Steaua București (player/assistant)
- 2000: Naţional București (player/assistant)
- 2000: Naţional București
- 2001: Panama (assistant)
- 2002: Oțelul Galați
- 2002–2003: FC Brașov
- 2004: Ceahlăul Piatra Neamț
- 2005: Inter Gaz București
- 2006–2007: UTA Arad
- 2007–2008: Steaua București
- 2008–2009: Steaua București
- 2009–2010: Vaslui
- 2010–2011: Steaua București
- 2012: FCM Târgu Mureș
- 2013–2014: CSMS Iași
- 2017–2018: CSA Steaua București (sporting director)
- 2018–2019: CSA Steaua București
- * Club domestic league appearances and goals

Marius Mihai Lăcătuș (Romanian pronunciation: [ˈmari.us miˈhaj ləkəˈtuʃ]; born 5 April 1964) is a Romanian professional football manager and former player.

He is the most successful footballer of Steaua București and was part of their European Cup victory in 1986. Lăcătuș is the all-time top scorer for Steaua with 16 goals in European competitions.

He played as a deep lying striker or inside forward for Steaua București most of his career, being the team's captain between 1994 and 1999. He also played for Italian side Fiorentina and Real Oviedo in Spain.

Lăcătuș is the most decorated player in the history of the Romanian First League. He has won the league a record ten times. Following him in the all time table are: Giedrius Arlauskis, Ciprian Deac, Adrian Bumbescu, Mircea Lucescu, Dumitru Stângaciu and Tudorel Stoica, all with 7 championships won.

On 7 July 2021, CSA Steaua București retired his shirt number 7 at the inauguration match of the new Steaua Stadium.

== Club career ==
Lăcătuș was an iconic player for Steaua București and was nicknamed The Beast (Fiara) by the fans. In the final of the 1986 European Cup, he took Steaua's first penalty in the shoot-out against Barcelona and converted it. Steaua drew 0–0 after extra time and won the shoot-out 2–0, with goalkeeper Helmut Duckadam saving all four of Barcelona's penalties.

In 1990, following the 1990 FIFA World Cup, he moved to Italy to join Fiorentina. During the World Cup, he had scored twice against the Soviet Union. After spending one season at Fiorentina, he moved to Spain in 1991 to join Real Oviedo. He played for Oviedo until 1993, when he returned to Steaua.

After returning to Steaua in 1993, Lăcătuș remained one of the club's key players until 1999. During this period, he won the Liga I title several times, including four consecutive league championships from the 1994–95 to 1997–98 seasons. He also served as the team's captain from 1994 to 1999. After leaving Steaua in 1999, he played for Național București and retired from professional football in 2000.

Lăcătuș made a total of 414 appearances and scored 103 goals in the Romanian top flight. In Serie A, he made 21 appearances and scored three goals, while in La Liga he made 51 appearances and scored seven goals. According to official club records, his European competition record for Steaua stands at 72 appearances and 17 goals.

In 2008, in recognition of his contribution to Steaua's 1986 European Cup triumph, Lăcătuș was awarded the second class of the Order of Sports Merit by Romanian President Traian Băsescu. His name was included among the recipients listed in the decree.

== International career ==
Lăcătuș made his debut for the Romania national football team on 7 February 1984 in a friendly match against Algeria, and made his final international appearance against Tunisia on 26 June 1998. Between 1984 and 1998, he made 83 appearances for Romania and scored 13 goals.

Lăcătuș participated in the 1990 FIFA World Cup, scoring twice in Romania's 2–0 group-stage victory over the Soviet Union on 9 June 1990. He scored in the 41st minute and again in the 10th minute of the second half, with his second goal coming from a penalty. Romania advanced from the group stage to the round of 16, where they drew 0–0 with Ireland after extra time on 25 June before losing 4–5 on penalties. Lăcătuș did not play in the match.

On 11 October 1995, he scored in a UEFA Euro 1996 qualifying match against France. Romania lost the match 3–1, with Lăcătuș scoring Romania's consolation goal in the seventh minute of the second half.

Lăcătuș also participated in UEFA Euro 1996 in June 1996. He played in the group-stage matches against France on 10 June and Bulgaria on 13 June, with Romania losing both matches.

Lăcătuș also participated in the 1998 FIFA World Cup, held in France, in June 1998. He came on as a substitute in Romania's group-stage match against England on 22 June and played for approximately five minutes. On 26 June, he started Romania's final group-stage match against Tunisia and played for approximately 45 minutes. The match ended in a 1–1 draw and marked Lăcătuș's final appearance for the national team.

== Career statistics ==
=== International ===
Appearances and goals by national team and year
National team	Year	Apps	Goals
Romania	1984	5	1
Romania	1985	5	2
Romania	1986	4	1
Romania	1987	8	0
Romania	1988	4	0
Romania	1989	5	0
Romania	1990	14	4
Romania	1991	6	0
Romania	1992	6	1
Romania	1993	2	0
Romania	1994	5	1
Romania	1995	8	2
Romania	1996	5	1
Romania	1997	2	0
Romania	1998	4	0
Total		83	13

Scores and results list Romania's goal tally first, score column indicates score after each Lăcătuș goal.

List of international goals scored by Marius Lăcătuș
No.	Date	Venue	Opponent	Score	Result	Competition
1	21 November 1984	Bloomfield Stadium, Tel Aviv, Israel	Israel	1–1	1–1	Friendly
2	30 January 1985	Estádio José Alvalade, Lisbon, Portugal	Portugal	1–2	3–2	Friendly
3	30 January 1985	Estádio José Alvalade, Lisbon, Portugal	Portugal	2–2	3–2	Friendly
4	10 September 1986	Stadionul Steaua, Bucharest, Romania	Austria	2–0	4–0	UEFA Euro 1988 qualifying
5	26 May 1990	Heysel Stadium, Brussels, Belgium	Belgium	2–2	2–2	Friendly
6	9 June 1990	Stadio San Nicola, Bari, Italy	Soviet Union	1–0	2–0	1990 FIFA World Cup
7	9 June 1990	Stadio San Nicola, Bari, Italy	Soviet Union	2–0	2–0	1990 FIFA World Cup
8	29 August 1990	Central Lenin Stadium, Moscow, Russian SFSR, Soviet Union	Soviet Union	1–0	2–1	Friendly
9	6 May 1992	Stadionul Steaua, Bucharest, Romania	Faroe Islands	3–0	7–0	1994 FIFA World Cup qualification
10	14 December 1994	Ramat Gan Stadium, Ramat Gan, Israel	Israel	1–0	1–1	UEFA Euro 1996 qualifying
11	7 June 1995	Stadionul Steaua, Bucharest, Romania	Israel	1–0	2–1	UEFA Euro 1996 qualifying
12	11 October 1995	Stadionul Steaua, Bucharest, Romania	France	1–2	1–3	UEFA Euro 1996 qualifying
13	24 April 1996	Stadionul Steaua, Bucharest, Romania	Georgia	4–0	5–0	Friendly

== Honours ==
=== Player ===
Steaua București

- Divizia A: 1984–85, 1985–86, 1986–87, 1987–88, 1988–89, 1993–94, 1994–95, 1995–96, 1996–97, 1997–98 (record)
- Cupa României: 1984–85, 1986–87, 1987–88, 1988–89, 1995–96, 1996–97, 1998–99
- Supercupa României: 1994, 1995, 1998
- European Cup: 1985–86; runner-up: 1988–89
- European Super Cup: 1986
- Intercontinental Cup runner-up: 1986

=== Manager ===
Vaslui

- Cupa României runner-up: 2009–10

CSMS Iași

- Liga II: 2013–14
