= Laurențiu Reghecampf =

Romanian association football manager and former player

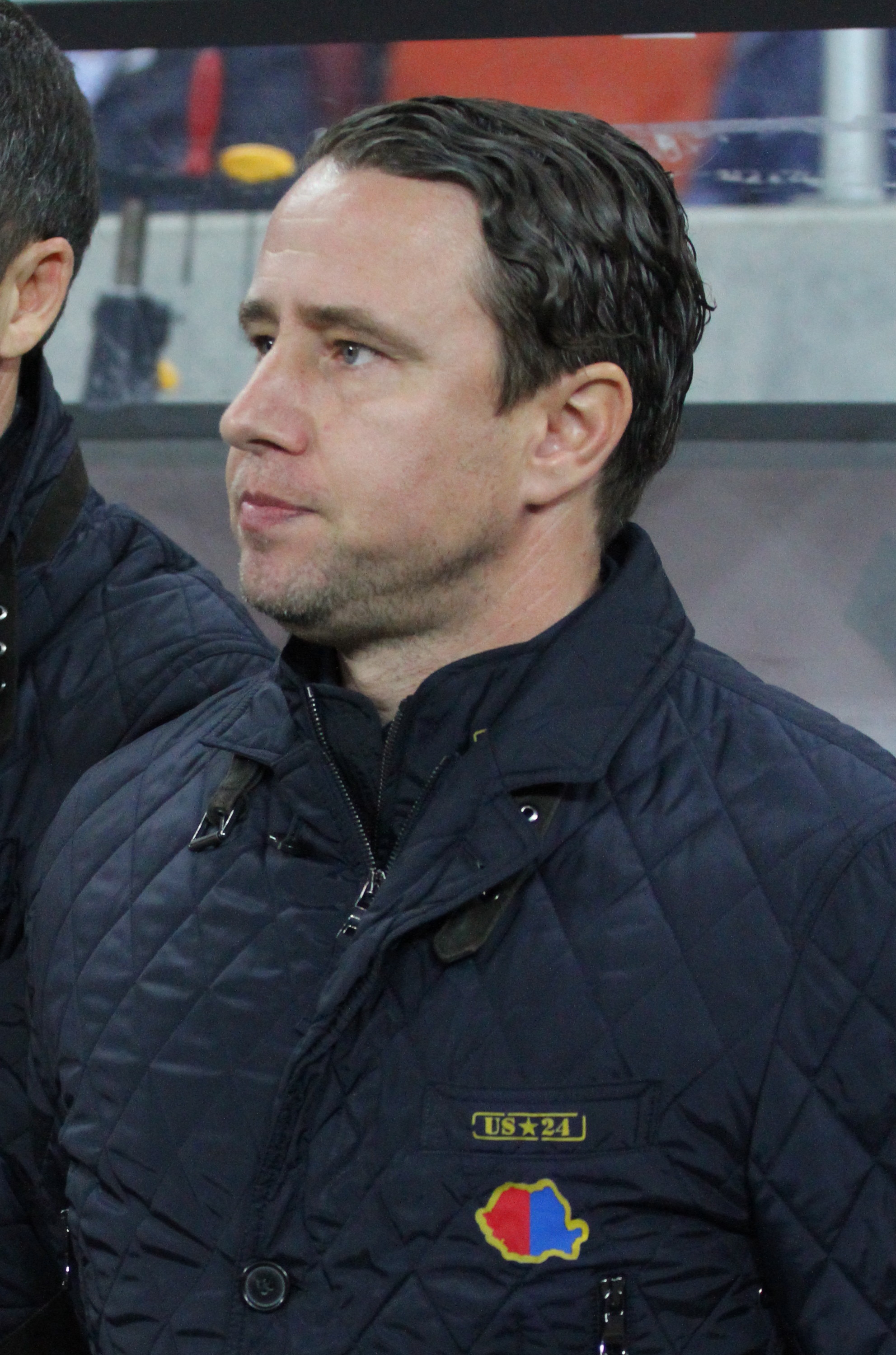
- Reghecampf coaching Steaua București în 2013

Personal information
- Full name: Laurențiu Aurelian Reghecampf
- Date of birth: 19 September 1975 (age 51)
- Place of birth: Târgoviște, Romania
- Height: 1.74 m (5 ft 9 in)
- Position: Midfielder

Team information
- Current team: FCSB (head coach)

Youth career
- 1987–1993: CS Târgoviște

Senior career*
Years	Team	Apps	(Gls)
1993–1996	Oțelul Târgoviște	49	(4)
1993–1994	→ St. Pölten (loan)	1	(0)
1997–2000	Steaua București	73	(5)
1998–1999	→ Litex Lovech (loan)	14	(4)
2000–2004	Energie Cottbus	135	(17)
2005–2008	Alemannia Aachen	90	(18)
2008–2009	1. FC Kaiserslautern	2	(1)
Total		365	(49)

International career
2003	Romania	1	(0)

Managerial career
- 2009–2010: FC Snagov
- 2010: FC Universitatea Craiova
- 2010: Gloria Bistrița
- 2010–2011: FC Snagov
- 2011: FC Universitatea Craiova
- 2011: FC Snagov
- 2011–2012: Concordia Chiajna
- 2012–2014: Steaua București
- 2014–2015: Al-Hilal
- 2015: Litex Lovech
- 2015–2017: Steaua București
- 2017–2018: Al Wahda
- 2019–2020: Al-Wasl
- 2021: Al Ahli
- 2021–2022: Universitatea Craiova
- 2022–2023: Neftchi Baku
- 2023: Universitatea Craiova
- 2023–2024: Al-Tai
- 2024–2025: Espérance de Tunis
- 2025–2026: Al Hilal Omdurman
- 2026: Espérance de Tunis
- 2026–: FCSB
- * Club domestic league appearances and goals

Laurențiu Aurelian Reghecampf, (born 19 September 1975) is a Romanian professional football manager and former player who is currently in charge of Liga I club FCSB.

== Playing career ==
=== Club ===
Reghecampf, who is of partial German descent, was born in Târgoviște and began his career with local club Chindia. In the 1993–94 season, at the age of 18, he was loaned to Austrian Bundesliga side SKN St. Pölten.

He later joined Steaua București, where he won two league titles. In 1998, he was loaned to Bulgarian side Litex Lovech, with whom he won the 1999 A PFG title.

In 2000, he moved to German Bundesliga club Energie Cottbus. Four years later, he joined Alemannia Aachen, where he quickly became a fan favorite and helped the club win promotion to the Bundesliga in his first season. A few seasons later, he was named captain of Alemannia. In the round of 16 of the 2006–07 German Cup, he scored twice in a 4–2 victory over Bayern Munich, knocking them out of the competition.

On 4 July 2008, he joined second-tier side 1. FC Kaiserslautern on a free transfer for the 2008–09 2. Bundesliga season before announcing his retirement in 2009, at the age of 34.

=== International ===
Reghecampf made one appearance for Romania on 29 March 2003 when coach Anghel Iordănescu sent him on the field in the 62nd minute in order to replace Paul Codrea in a match which ended with a 5–2 home loss against Denmark at the Euro 2004 qualifiers.

== Managerial career ==
Reghecampf began his managerial career with Liga II side Snagov in 2009. At the end of 2009–10 season, he was brought to Universitatea Craiova to save the team from relegation. He succeeded in this task, but he was not retained for the following season. Instead, Reghecampf was named coach at Gloria Bistrița, where he was sacked after 12 matches due to poor results. He returned to Snagov, but after just five matches, he was called back to Craiova to help the team avoid relegation. He was sacked after only six matches following a conflict with several players.

He started the 2011–12 season at FC Snagov for a second spell. In December 2011, he signed a contract with Romanian Liga I club Concordia Chiajna, with the primary objective of avoiding relegation. When he took over, the club was 17th overall and just above the relegation zone. He overhauled almost the entire squad, bringing in 17 new players, most of them from Snagov. After a series of wins, his side finished the season in ninth place.

=== Steaua Bucuresti ===
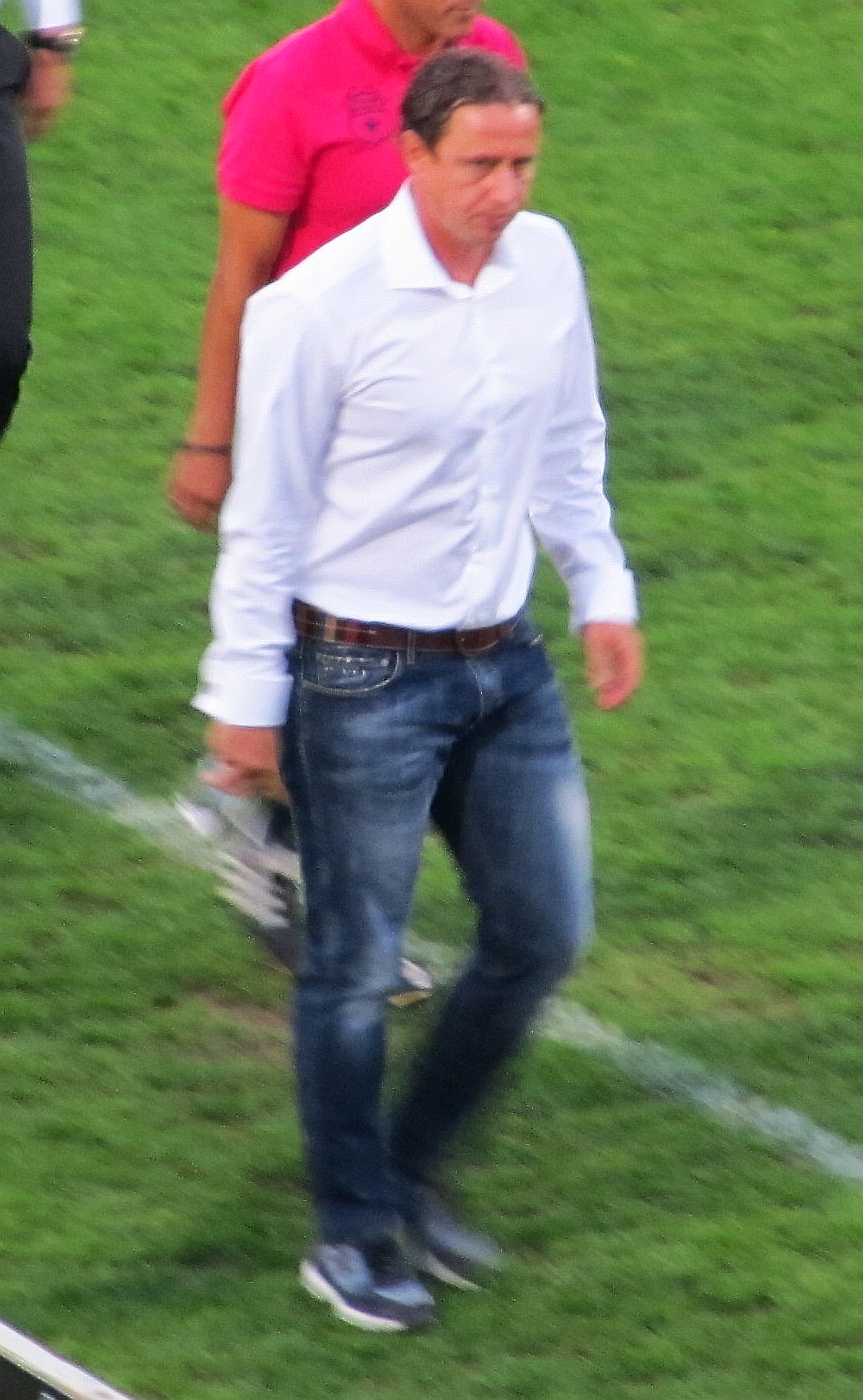
Reghecampf in 2013

His progress at Concordia brought the attention of his former club, Steaua București, and at the end of the 2011–12 season, they offered him a one-year contract. His main objective was to secure Steaua's first championship title after a seven-year absence. In March 2013, he guided Steaua to the last 16 of the Europa League, eliminating Ajax from the competition. The first leg away ended with a 2–0 win for Ajax in Amsterdam. In the second leg at home, Steaua took a 2–0 lead, and the 2–2 aggregate sent the match into extra-time. Steaua beat the Dutch side 4–2 on penalties. Steaua were then eliminated by eventual winners Chelsea after winning 1–0 in the first leg at home and losing 1–3 away at Stamford Bridge. In May 2013, he clinched the Romanian League title and later the Romanian Supercup. On 9 May 2014, Reghecampf led the club to their second consecutive Liga I title. He then guided Steaua to the UEFA Champions League group stages and also took his side to the Romanian Cup final, where they lost 4–2 on penalties to league runners-up Astra Giurgiu.

=== Al Hilal ===
On 27 May 2014, he signed a two-year contract with Saudi Arabian side Al Hilal. He led Al-Hilal to the AFC Champions League final five months after his appointment, defeating Al-Ain 4–2 on aggregate in the semi-finals. However, his side lost the final to Western Sydney Wanderers in a two-legged match. He was sacked on 15 February 2015 after another final loss, this time in the Saudi Crown Prince Cup.

=== Litex Lovech and return to Steaua ===
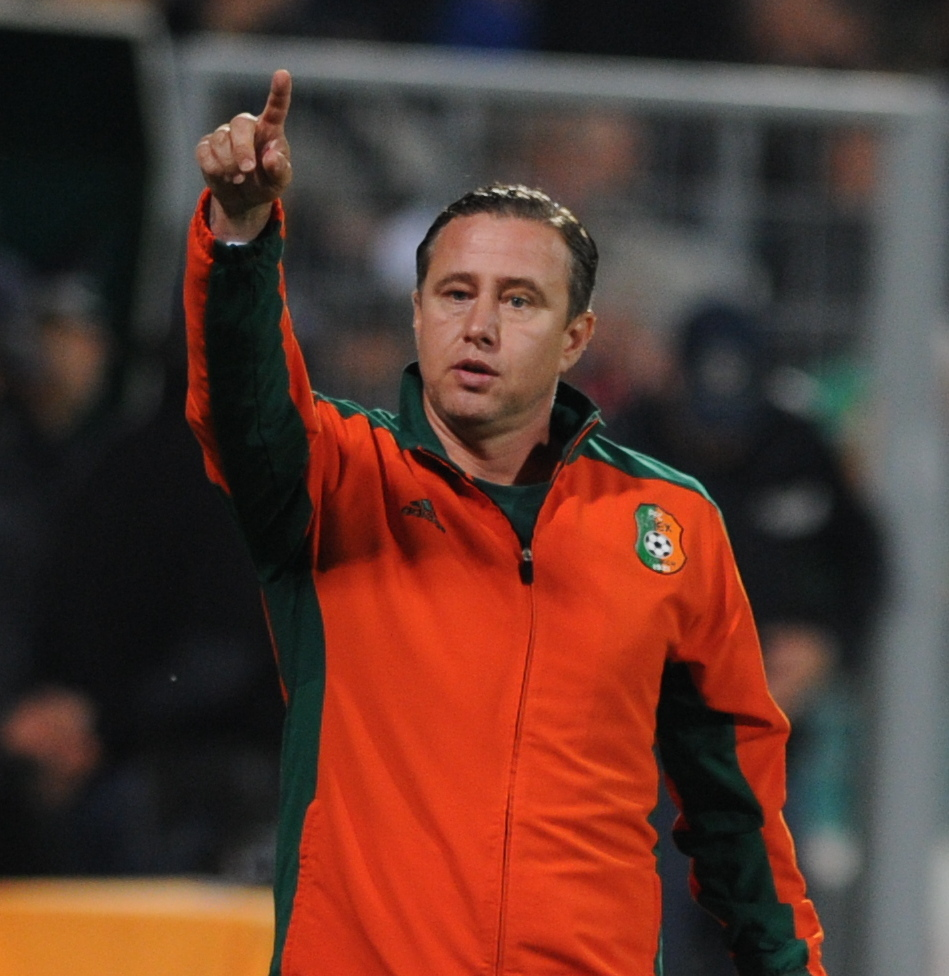
Reghecampf as Litex Lovech manager in 2015

In August 2015, he was appointed manager of Bulgarian side Litex Lovech. However, in December 2015, Reghecampf decided to leave the club and return to Steaua București for a second stint.

During his second tenure, Steaua finished in second place in Liga I for two consecutive seasons (2015–16 and 2016–17). In addition, he guided the club to victory in the 2015–16 Cupa Ligii. Reghecampf remained in charge until May 2017, when he parted ways with the club.

=== Al Wahda ===
On 3 July 2017, Reghecampf was announced as the new head coach of the Emirati club Al Wahda on a 2-year deal replacing Javier Aguirre. According to sources, his salary will be $2.6 million per season plus potential bonuses up to another $1.6 million. On 16 September 2017, in his Arabian Gulf League debut, Al-Wahda defeated Dibba Al-Fujairah 5–0.

He led Al Wahda to three domestic trophies during his tenure, including two UAE Super Cup titles (2017 and 2018) and the UAE League Cup in 2018.

=== Al Wasl ===
In January 2019, Reghecampf took over as manager of the relegation-threatened UAE Pro League club Al Wasl. He successfully guided them to safety, avoiding relegation after a strong run.

=== Al Ahli Saudi ===
On 1 April 2021, Reghecampf was announced as the new manager of Saudi Professional League club Al Ahli Saudi. Less than two months later, after two wins, two draws and a loss, he was dismissed.

=== CS Universitatea Craiova ===
On 26 July 2021, Reghecampf returned to his native Romania, where he signed a two-year contract to become the new manager of CS Universitatea Craiova. After finishing the previous season third in the league table, the team saw themselves in sixth position in December 2021, triggering rumours of his premature departure from the club. As a result, Reghecampf transfer-listed several first-team players, including Mihai Bălașa, Matteo Fedele, Antoni Ivanov and Mihai Roman. In June 2022, he stepped down as coach.

=== Neftchi Baku ===
On 21 June 2022, Neftchi Baku announced the appointment of Reghecampf on a two-year contract. After one year, on 21 June 2023, Reghecampf left Neftçi by mutual agreement.

=== Al Tai ===
On 25 September 2023, Reghecampf was appointed as manager of Saudi Pro League club Al-Tai. In April 2024, he resigned from his position.

=== Espérance de Tunis ===
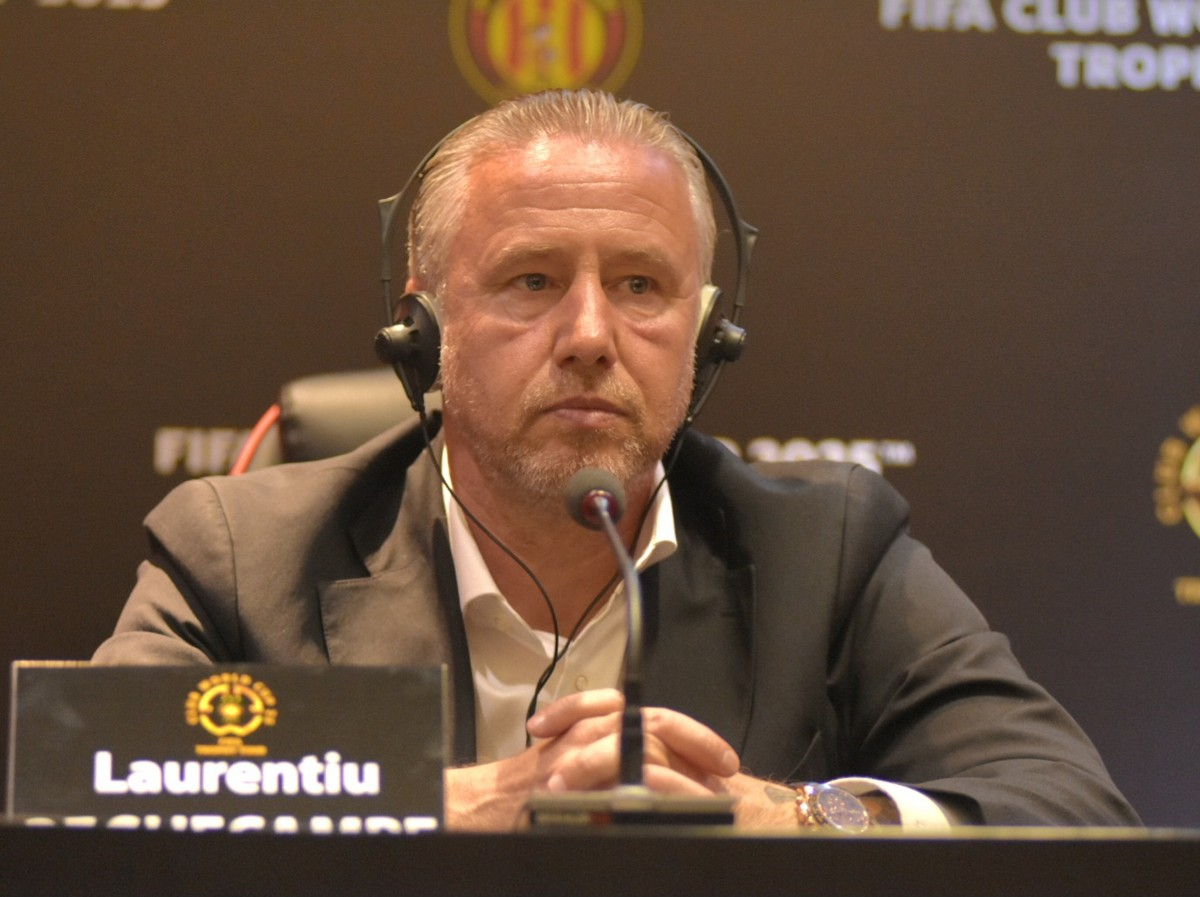
Reghecampf during a press conference with ES Tunis in 2025

On 5 November 2024, Reghecampf signed a contract with Tunisian Ligue Professionnelle 1 club Espérance de Tunis until June 2026, with an annual salary of €500,000. This deal made him the highest-paid coach in Tunisian football. In February 2025, he guided the club to victory in the Tunisian Super Cup, defeating Stade Tunisien 2–0 in the final. He was unexpectedly released by the club on 17 March 2025, despite leaving Espérance in first place. During his four months in charge, he won 16 matches, drew 6, and lost only 2 matches, while also qualifying the club for the quarter-finals of the 2024–25 CAF Champions League.

=== Al Hilal Omdurman ===
On 7 August 2025, Reghecampf was appointed as the new manager of Sudanese club Al-Hilal S.C. He took charge during the ongoing civil war in Sudan, which forced the club to relocate and temporarily play their home matches at Amahoro Stadium in Kigali while competing in the 2025–26 Rwanda Premier League. Under his management, Al‑Hilal progressed through the CAF Champions League qualifying rounds, defeating Jamus and Kenya Police to reach the group stage, where they opened their campaign with a 2–1 victory over Algerian side MC Alger.

=== Return to Espérance de Tunis ===
In June 2026, Reghecampf returned to Espérance de Tunis, replacing Patrice Beaumelle. He left in September the same year, after just four games in charge, in order to rejoin his former club, FCSB.

=== Return to FCSB ===
In September 2026, Reghecampf agreed to return in charge of FCSB for a third time. He was officially announced as head coach of the Romanian side on 24 September.

== Managerial statistics ==
As of match played 22 November 2026

Managerial record by team and tenure
Team	Nat	From	To	Record							
Team	Nat	From	To	G	W	D	L	GF	GA	GD	Win %
FC Snagov	(Romania)	14 August 2009	13 May 2010	29	16	5	8	57	36	+21	55.17
FC Universitatea Craiova	(Romania)	14 May 2010	23 May 2010	2	1	0	1	3	2	+1	50.00
Gloria Bistrița	(Romania)	3 June 2010	23 October 2010	13	3	4	6	16	17	−1	23.08
FC Snagov	(Romania)	28 November 2010	3 April 2011	5	3	1	1	7	5	+2	60.00
FC Universitatea Craiova	(Romania)	4 April 2011	1 May 2011	5	1	1	3	3	8	−5	20.00
FC Snagov	(Romania)	27 June 2011	17 December 2011	16	6	6	4	26	21	+5	37.50
Concordia Chiajna	(Romania)	18 December 2011	20 May 2012	16	11	1	4	30	20	+10	68.75
Steaua București	(Romania)	21 May 2012	27 May 2014	103	63	27	13	205	91	+114	61.17
Al-Hilal	(Saudi Arabia)	28 May 2014	15 February 2015	24	13	6	5	40	19	+21	54.17
Litex Lovech	(Bulgaria)	7 August 2015	2 December 2015	17	8	7	2	29	14	+15	47.06
Steaua București	(Romania)	3 December 2015	19 May 2017	73	37	20	16	104	73	+31	50.68
Al Wahda	(United Arab Emirates)	3 July 2017	24 November 2018	62	36	10	16	141	96	+45	58.06
Al Wasl	(United Arab Emirates)	26 December 2018	18 October 2020	61	25	11	25	99	126	−27	40.98
Al Ahli	(Saudi Arabia)	27 March 2021	30 June 2021	11	3	4	4	15	20	−5	27.27
Universitatea Craiova	(Romania)	26 July 2021	12 June 2022	45	26	7	12	86	37	+49	57.78
Neftchi Baku	(Azerbaijan)	21 June 2022	20 June 2023	45	24	8	13	73	47	+26	53.33
Universitatea Craiova	(Romania)	26 July 2023	18 September 2023	7	4	1	2	11	8	+3	57.14
Al-Tai	(Saudi Arabia)	25 September 2023	8 April 2024	19	4	3	12	21	43	−22	21.05
Espérance de Tunis	(Tunisia)	5 November 2024	17 March 2025	24	16	6	2	49	18	+31	66.67
Al Hilal S.C.	(Sudan)	7 August 2025	15 June 2026	36	22	8	6	73	30	+43	61.11
Espérance de Tunis	(Tunisia)	15 June 2026	24 September 2026	4	3	0	1	7	6	+1	75.00
FCSB	(Romania)	24 September 2026	Present	7	3	1	3	7	5	+2	42.86
Total				624	328	137	159	1,102	802	+300	52.56

== Honours ==
=== Player ===
Oțelul Târgoviște

- Divizia B: 1995–96
- Divizia C: 1994–95

Steaua București

- Divizia A: 1996–97, 1997–98
- Cupa României: 1996–97
- Supercupa României: 1998

Litex Lovech

- A PFG: 1998–99

=== Individual ===
- Germany Goal of the Month December: 2006

=== Coach ===
Steaua București

- Liga I: 2012–13, 2013–14
- Supercupa României: 2013
- Cupa Ligii: 2015–16

Al Hilal

- AFC Champions League runner-up: 2014
- Saudi Crown Prince Cup runner-up: 2014–15

Al Wahda

- UAE League Cup: 2017–18
- UAE Super Cup: 2017, 2018
- UAE Pro-League runner-up: 2017–18

Neftchi Baku

- Azerbaijan Cup runner-up: 2022–23

Espérance de Tunis

- Tunisian Super Cup: 2024

Al Hilal Omdurman

- Rwanda Premier League: 2025–26
- Sudan Premier League: 2025–26

=== Individual ===
- Romania Coach of the Year: 2013
