= 1996–97 Divizia A =

79th season of top-tier football league in Romania

Divizia A
- Season: 1996–97
- Champions: Steaua București
- Relegated: Politehnica Timișoara; Braşov
- Champions League: Steaua București
- Cup Winners' Cup: Naţional București
- UEFA Cup: Dinamo București; Oţelul Galaţi
- Intertoto Cup: Rapid București; Gloria Bistriţa
- Matches: 306
- Goals: 871 (2.85 per match)
- Top goalscorer: Sabin Ilie (31)
- Biggest home win: Petrolul 7–1 Sportul; Braşov 6–0 Jiul
- Biggest away win: Cluj 1–7 Steaua
- Highest scoring: Steaua 5–4 Cluj; Cluj 5–4 Ceahlăul; Petrolul 4–5 Politehnica
- Longest winning run: Steaua (5)
- Longest unbeaten run: Steaua (10)
- Longest losing run: Politehnica (7)

The 1996–97 Divizia A was the seventy-ninth season of Divizia A, the top-level football league of Romania.

== Teams ==
Location of teams in 1996-97 Divizia A

== League table ==
| Pos | Team | Pld | W | D | L | GF | GA | GD | Pts | Qualification or relegation |
|---|---|---|---|---|---|---|---|---|---|---|
| 1 | Steaua București (C) | 34 | 23 | 4 | 7 | 87 | 40 | +47 | 73 | Qualification to Champions League first qualifying round |
| 2 | Național București | 34 | 21 | 5 | 8 | 69 | 36 | +33 | 68 | Qualification to Cup Winners' Cup qualifying round |
| 3 | Dinamo București | 34 | 18 | 5 | 11 | 56 | 34 | +22 | 59 | Qualification to UEFA Cup first qualifying round |
| 4 | Oțelul Galați | 34 | 17 | 7 | 10 | 54 | 39 | +15 | 58 | Qualification to UEFA Cup first qualifying round |
| 5 | Bacău | 34 | 16 | 5 | 13 | 43 | 41 | +2 | 53 | |
| 6 | Ceahlăul Piatra Neamț | 34 | 15 | 7 | 12 | 51 | 50 | +1 | 52 | |
| 7 | Argeș Pitești | 34 | 14 | 8 | 12 | 46 | 37 | +9 | 50 | |
| 8 | Rapid București | 34 | 13 | 9 | 12 | 45 | 41 | +4 | 48 | Qualification to Intertoto Cup group stage |
| 9 | Petrolul Ploiești | 34 | 13 | 7 | 14 | 48 | 43 | +5 | 46 (Note: PET 3-0 FAR; FAR 1-0 PET) | |
| 10 | Farul Constanța | 34 | 14 | 4 | 16 | 46 | 52 | −6 | 46 | |
| 11 | Universitatea Craiova | 34 | 12 | 7 | 15 | 48 | 52 | −4 | 43 | |
| 12 | Sportul Studențesc București | 34 | 12 | 6 | 16 | 36 | 52 | −16 | 42 | |
| 13 | Gloria Bistrița | 34 | 11 | 8 | 15 | 38 | 45 | −7 | 41 (Note: GLO 3-0 JIU; JIU 2-0 GLO) | Qualification to Intertoto Cup group stage |
| 14 | Jiul Petroşani | 34 | 12 | 5 | 17 | 33 | 61 | −28 | 41 | |
| 15 | Universitatea Cluj | 34 | 11 | 6 | 17 | 52 | 67 | −15 | 39 | |
| 16 | Chindia Târgoviște | 34 | 11 | 5 | 18 | 32 | 55 | −23 | 38 | |
| 17 | Politehnica Timișoara (R) | 34 | 10 | 5 | 19 | 45 | 65 | −20 | 35 | Relegation to Divizia B |
| 18 | Brașov (R) | 34 | 9 | 5 | 20 | 42 | 61 | −19 | 32 | Relegation to Divizia B |

Source: LT (in Romanian)
Rules for classification: 1) points; 2) head-to-head points; 3) head-to-head goal difference; 4) head-to-head goals scored; 5) goal difference; 6) number of goals scored. Head-to-Head: used when head-to-head record is used to rank tied teams.
(C) Champions; (R) Relegated

=== Positions by round ===
| Team ╲ Round | 1 | 2 | 3 | 4 | 5 | 6 | 7 | 8 | 9 | 10 | 11 | 12 | 13 | 14 | 15 | 16 | 17 | 18 | 19 | 20 | 21 | 22 | 23 | 24 | 25 | 26 | 27 | 28 | 29 | 30 | 31 | 32 | 33 | 34 |
|---|---|---|---|---|---|---|---|---|---|---|---|---|---|---|---|---|---|---|---|---|---|---|---|---|---|---|---|---|---|---|---|---|---|---|
| Argeș Pitești | 9 | 12 | 6 | 11 | 13 | 13 | 11 | 10 | 12 | 11 | 12 | 9 | 6 | 8 | 9 | 7 | 8 | 9 | 6 | 7 | 6 | 7 | 6 | 5 | 4 | 5 | 5 | 6 | 7 | 6 | 7 | 6 | 7 | 7 |
| Bacău | 14 | 6 | 2 | 5 | 7 | 10 | 8 | 8 | 9 | 13 | 8 | 10 | 12 | 14 | 13 | 14 | 12 | 10 | 11 | 8 | 10 | 8 | 8 | 8 | 7 | 7 | 7 | 7 | 6 | 7 | 6 | 7 | 6 | 5 |
| Brașov | 18 | 10 | 13 | 15 | 15 | 16 | 16 | 16 | 17 | 15 | 16 | 17 | 17 | 17 | 16 | 16 | 16 | 16 | 18 | 18 | 18 | 17 | 17 | 17 | 17 | 17 | 18 | 18 | 18 | 18 | 18 | 18 | 18 | 18 |
| Ceahlăul Piatra Neamț | 15 | 7 | 12 | 14 | 14 | 15 | 13 | 12 | 10 | 8 | 7 | 8 | 8 | 9 | 12 | 13 | 11 | 6 | 8 | 10 | 8 | 6 | 5 | 6 | 6 | 6 | 6 | 5 | 4 | 5 | 5 | 5 | 5 | 6 |
| Universitatea Craiova | 1 | 4 | 9 | 12 | 12 | 9 | 10 | 13 | 11 | 9 | 11 | 11 | 13 | 10 | 14 | 9 | 14 | 12 | 12 | 12 | 13 | 12 | 14 | 15 | 12 | 12 | 14 | 12 | 8 | 8 | 9 | 8 | 10 | 11 |
| Dinamo București | 3 | 2 | 1 | 1 | 1 | 3 | 2 | 1 | 1 | 4 | 4 | 4 | 5 | 4 | 4 | 4 | 4 | 4 | 4 | 4 | 4 | 3 | 3 | 3 | 3 | 3 | 3 | 3 | 3 | 3 | 3 | 3 | 3 | 3 |
| Farul Constanța | 10 | 13 | 7 | 3 | 8 | 7 | 9 | 9 | 8 | 10 | 10 | 12 | 10 | 12 | 10 | 11 | 9 | 11 | 13 | 13 | 14 | 13 | 15 | 11 | 13 | 15 | 12 | 15 | 11 | 14 | 10 | 13 | 11 | 10 |
| Gloria Bistrița | 17 | 9 | 15 | 16 | 16 | 17 | 17 | 17 | 16 | 18 | 18 | 16 | 16 | 16 | 17 | 18 | 17 | 17 | 16 | 15 | 16 | 16 | 16 | 16 | 16 | 14 | 15 | 13 | 14 | 16 | 13 | 15 | 13 | 13 |
| Jiul Petroşani | 2 | 1 | 4 | 2 | 4 | 2 | 7 | 5 | 7 | 7 | 9 | 7 | 9 | 7 | 7 | 6 | 6 | 7 | 10 | 9 | 11 | 14 | 9 | 9 | 11 | 8 | 10 | 11 | 13 | 12 | 15 | 11 | 14 | 14 |
| Oțelul Galați | 13 | 18 | 11 | 8 | 10 | 8 | 6 | 2 | 5 | 3 | 3 | 3 | 3 | 3 | 3 | 3 | 3 | 3 | 3 | 3 | 3 | 4 | 4 | 4 | 5 | 4 | 4 | 4 | 5 | 4 | 4 | 4 | 4 | 4 |
| Petrolul Ploiești | 11 | 14 | 16 | 17 | 17 | 18 | 18 | 18 | 18 | 17 | 15 | 15 | 15 | 15 | 15 | 15 | 13 | 14 | 14 | 14 | 12 | 11 | 13 | 14 | 15 | 13 | 13 | 14 | 16 | 13 | 16 | 12 | 9 | 9 |
| Național București | 5 | 3 | 3 | 7 | 3 | 1 | 1 | 4 | 3 | 2 | 2 | 2 | 2 | 2 | 2 | 1 | 2 | 2 | 2 | 1 | 1 | 1 | 1 | 1 | 1 | 1 | 1 | 2 | 2 | 1 | 2 | 2 | 2 | 2 |
| Rapid București | 7 | 15 | 17 | 18 | 18 | 14 | 15 | 14 | 13 | 12 | 13 | 13 | 11 | 11 | 8 | 10 | 7 | 5 | 7 | 6 | 7 | 9 | 10 | 10 | 8 | 9 | 11 | 8 | 9 | 9 | 8 | 9 | 8 | 8 |
| Sportul Studențesc București | 16 | 17 | 18 | 13 | 11 | 11 | 12 | 11 | 14 | 14 | 14 | 14 | 14 | 13 | 11 | 12 | 15 | 15 | 15 | 16 | 15 | 15 | 11 | 12 | 14 | 16 | 16 | 16 | 15 | 11 | 12 | 10 | 12 | 12 |
| Steaua București | 4 | 5 | 14 | 10 | 6 | 4 | 3 | 3 | 2 | 1 | 1 | 1 | 1 | 1 | 1 | 2 | 1 | 1 | 1 | 2 | 2 | 2 | 2 | 2 | 2 | 2 | 2 | 1 | 1 | 2 | 1 | 1 | 1 | 1 |
| Politehnica Timișoara | 12 | 16 | 10 | 6 | 9 | 12 | 14 | 15 | 15 | 16 | 17 | 18 | 18 | 18 | 18 | 17 | 18 | 18 | 17 | 17 | 17 | 18 | 18 | 18 | 18 | 18 | 17 | 17 | 17 | 17 | 17 | 17 | 17 | 17 |
| Chindia Târgoviște | 6 | 8 | 5 | 9 | 5 | 6 | 5 | 7 | 4 | 5 | 6 | 5 | 4 | 5 | 5 | 8 | 10 | 13 | 9 | 11 | 9 | 10 | 12 | 13 | 10 | 11 | 9 | 10 | 12 | 15 | 14 | 16 | 16 | 16 |
| Universitatea Cluj | 8 | 11 | 8 | 4 | 2 | 5 | 4 | 6 | 6 | 6 | 5 | 6 | 7 | 6 | 6 | 5 | 5 | 8 | 5 | 5 | 5 | 5 | 7 | 7 | 9 | 10 | 8 | 9 | 10 | 10 | 11 | 14 | 15 | 15 |

Source: LT (in Romanian)

=== Results ===
| Home \ Away | ARG | BAC | BRA | CEA | UCR | DIN | FAR | GBI | JIU | OȚE | PET | NAT | RAP | SPO | STE | POL | CHI | UCL |
|---|---|---|---|---|---|---|---|---|---|---|---|---|---|---|---|---|---|---|
| Argeș Pitești | — | 3–0 | 2–0 | 4–1 | 0–1 | 0–0 | 4–1 | 2–0 | 3–0 | 0–0 | 0–0 | 0–0 | 2–2 | 1–0 | 1–2 | 1–0 | 2–1 | 2–1 |
| Bacău | 1–2 | — | 1–0 | 1–1 | 4–2 | 2–0 | 3–0 | 1–1 | 2–0 | 1–1 | 1–0 | 2–1 | 1–0 | 2–1 | 1–0 | 2–0 | 1–0 | 3–2 |
| Brașov | 3–0 | 1–1 | — | 1–0 | 1–2 | 2–1 | 3–1 | 2–1 | 6–0 | 0–0 | 2–1 | 1–1 | 1–1 | 1–1 | 0–4 | 3–1 | 2–0 | 2–3 |
| Ceahlăul Piatra Neamț | 2–1 | 3–1 | 3–1 | — | 2–0 | 1–1 | 4–2 | 0–0 | 4–1 | 0–2 | 3–2 | 1–0 | 0–0 | 1–0 | 1–0 | 0–0 | 1–0 | 3–1 |
| Universitatea Craiova | 1–3 | 1–1 | 5–0 | 3–1 | — | 0–2 | 2–3 | 1–1 | 0–0 | 2–0 | 1–1 | 2–0 | 3–1 | 1–2 | 3–2 | 0–0 | 1–1 | 4–1 |
| Dinamo București | 4–1 | 1–0 | 2–1 | 4–1 | 2–0 | — | 5–2 | 3–0 | 3–0 | 2–0 | 3–1 | 0–1 | 2–0 | 2–1 | 0–0 | 2–0 | 2–1 | 3–0 |
| Farul Constanța | 2–1 | 4–0 | 1–0 | 3–0 | 2–0 | 2–1 | — | 0–0 | 1–0 | 3–1 | 1–0 | 1–2 | 0–1 | 1–0 | 3–0 | 2–2 | 3–1 | 0–0 |
| Gloria Bistrița | 3–2 | 2–1 | 2–0 | 1–1 | 1–0 | 1–0 | 3–2 | — | 3–0 | 5–0 | 2–1 | 1–1 | 0–2 | 0–1 | 1–1 | 4–0 | 1–2 | 0–1 |
| Jiul Petroşani | 0–0 | 1–0 | 1–0 | 1–2 | 2–4 | 1–0 | 3–0 | 2–0 | — | 1–1 | 0–1 | 2–1 | 1–1 | 4–1 | 0–2 | 3–2 | 2–1 | 2–1 |
| Oțelul Galați | 1–0 | 1–2 | 2–1 | 2–1 | 5–1 | 3–1 | 1–0 | 3–0 | 0–1 | — | 3–0 | 2–0 | 1–1 | 3–0 | 1–5 | 2–0 | 6–1 | 2–0 |
| Petrolul Ploiești | 1–1 | 2–0 | 4–2 | 1–0 | 0–0 | 0–1 | 3–0 | 3–0 | 4–1 | 1–0 | — | 0–1 | 1–1 | 7–1 | 1–1 | 4–5 | 1–1 | 1–0 |
| Național București | 3–1 | 1–0 | 6–1 | 3–0 | 2–0 | 2–1 | 1–3 | 2–0 | 4–0 | 1–3 | 4–1 | — | 3–1 | 2–0 | 2–1 | 5–1 | 4–1 | 4–3 |
| Rapid București | 1–0 | 2–0 | 1–0 | 1–3 | 2–0 | 3–0 | 2–0 | 1–1 | 3–0 | 3–4 | 0–1 | 2–4 | — | 1–1 | 0–2 | 4–1 | 2–0 | 1–0 |
| Sportul Studențesc București | 1–1 | 2–0 | 3–1 | 1–2 | 4–2 | 0–5 | 2–1 | 2–1 | 1–1 | 0–2 | 0–1 | 0–0 | 2–0 | — | 0–3 | 1–0 | 2–1 | 0–0 |
| Steaua București | 2–1 | 1–5 | 3–0 | 3–3 | 3–0 | 3–1 | 2–1 | 2–0 | 6–2 | 2–1 | 3–0 | 3–1 | 3–1 | 3–1 | — | 5–1 | 4–1 | 5–4 |
| Politehnica Timișoara | 1–3 | 4–1 | 2–1 | 3–2 | 0–4 | 3–0 | 0–0 | 5–2 | 0–1 | 3–0 | 1–2 | 1–1 | 1–2 | 0–1 | 1–0 | — | 2–1 | 4–1 |
| Chindia Târgoviște | 2–1 | 1–0 | 2–1 | 1–0 | 0–2 | 1–1 | 2–0 | 0–1 | 2–0 | 0–0 | 2–1 | 1–3 | 1–0 | 1–0 | 1–4 | 1–0 | — | 0–0 |
| Universitatea Cluj | 0–1 | 0–2 | 3–2 | 5–4 | 3–0 | 1–1 | 3–1 | 1–0 | 2–0 | 1–1 | 2–1 | 0–3 | 2–2 | 1–4 | 1–7 | 4–1 | 5–1 | — |

Source: LT (in Romanian)
Legend: Blue = home team win; Yellow = draw; Red = away team win.

== Top goalscorers ==
| Position | Player | Club | Goals |
|---|---|---|---|
| 1 | Sabin Ilie | Steaua București | 31 |
| 2 | Mugur Gușatu | Politehnica Timișoara | 17 |
| 3 | Leonard Strizu | Braşov | 16 |
| 4 | Bănică Oprea | Farul Constanța | 15 |
| 5 | Dumitru Târțău | Rapid București | 14 |

== Champion squad ==
Steaua București

Goalkeepers: Bogdan Stelea (22 / 0); Daniel Gherasim (11 / 0); Zoltan Ritli (6 / 0).
Defenders: Marius Baciu (32 / 2); Tiberiu Csik (11 / 0); Bogdan Bucur (13 / 0); Adrian Matei (11 / 0); Iulian Miu (20 / 0); Daniel Prodan (12 / 0); Valeriu Răchită (19 / 1); Laurențiu Reghecampf (12 / 1); Radu Cozma (1 / 0); Lucian Nan (3 / 0); Fani Vrânceanu (1 / 0); Tudorel Zamfirescu (13 / 0); Marin Dumitrache (1 / 0).
Midfielders: Augustin Călin (23 / 8); Cristian Ciocoiu (22 / 6); Iulian Filipescu (9 / 0); Damian Militaru (31 / 6); Cristian Pușcaș (5 / 0); Iosif Rotariu (16 / 4); Ilie Stan (11 / 2); Dennis Șerban (31 / 8); Leonard Nemțanu (3 / 1); Marian Alexandru (1 / 0).
Forwards: Sabin Ilie (31 / 31); Adrian Ilie (10 / 1); Marius Lăcătuș (22 / 5); Roland Nagy (28 / 2); Narcis Răducan (2 / 0); Laurențiu Roșu (23 / 6); Cătălin Munteanu (12 / 5); Marius Mitu (2 / 0); Ilie Breciugă (1 / 0); Cătălin Dănilescu (1 / 0); Mircea Stanciu (2 / 0).
(league appearances and goals listed in brackets)

Manager: Dumitru Dumitriu.

== Attendances ==
| No. | Club | Average |
|---|---|---|
| 1 | Jiul | 12,471 |
| 2 | Craiova | 12,206 |
| 3 | Steaua | 10,382 |
| 4 | Oţelul | 10,000 |
| 5 | Chindia | 8,235 |
| 6 | FC Rapid | 7,382 |
| 7 | Timişoara | 7,088 |
| 8 | Petrolul | 6,824 |
| 9 | Argeş | 6,559 |
| 10 | U Cluj | 6,029 |
| 11 | Ceahlăul | 5,794 |
| 12 | Farul | 5,647 |
| 13 | Dinamo 1948 | 5,147 |
| 14 | Bacău | 4,635 |
| 15 | Braşov | 4,471 |
| 16 | Naţional | 4,235 |
| 17 | Sportul Studenţesc | 3,553 |
| 18 | Gloria | 3,276 |
