= 1997–98 Divizia A =

80th season of top-tier football league in Romania

Divizia A
- Season: 1997–98
- Champions: Steaua București
- Relegated: Chindia Târgovişte; Sportul Studenţesc; Jiul Petroşani
- Champions League: Steaua București
- Cup Winners' Cup: Rapid București
- UEFA Cup: Argeş Piteşti; Oţelul Galaţi
- Intertoto Cup: Naţional București
- Matches played: 306
- Goals scored: 891 (2.91 per match)
- Top goalscorer: Vasile Oană, Constantin Barbu (21)
- Biggest home win: Oţelul 7–0 Jiul; Craiova 7–0 Jiul
- Biggest away win: Reşiţa 1–6 Rapid; Jiul 0–5 Argeş; Jiul 0–5 Gloria
- Highest scoring: Bacău 5–3 Argeş; Dinamo 6– 2 Bacău; Dinamo 5–3 Farul; Dinamo 7–1 Jiul; Jiul 2–6 Rapid
- Longest winning run: Argeş (8)
- Longest unbeaten run: Rapid (13)
- Longest losing run: Sportul (10)

The 1997–98 Divizia A was the eightieth season of Divizia A, the top-level football league of Romania.

== Teams ==
Location of teams in 1997-98 Divizia A

== League table ==
Pos	Team	Pld	W	D	L	GF	GA	GD	Pts	Qualification or relegation
1	Steaua București (C)	34	25	5	4	83	36	+47	80	Qualification to Champions League second qualifying round
2	Rapid București	34	24	6	4	70	24	+46	78	Qualification to Cup Winners' Cup qualifying round
3	Argeș Pitești	34	20	5	9	56	38	+18	65	Qualification to UEFA Cup first qualifying round
4	Oțelul Galați	34	20	4	10	54	28	+26	64	Qualification to UEFA Cup first qualifying round
5	Național București	34	18	6	10	57	40	+17	60	Qualification to Intertoto Cup first round
6	Dinamo București	34	17	3	14	66	50	+16	54	
7	Reșița	34	15	6	13	55	49	+6	51	
8	Universitatea Craiova	34	15	4	15	65	46	+19	49 (Note: CRA 4-1 CEA; CEA 3-2 CRA)	
9	Ceahlăul Piatra Neamț	34	14	7	13	46	49	−3	49	
10	Bacău	34	12	9	13	41	42	−1	45	
11	Gloria Bistrița	34	13	5	16	56	63	−7	44	
12	Farul Constanța	34	13	4	17	36	52	−16	43	
13	Universitatea Cluj	34	11	7	16	42	40	+2	40 (Note: UCL 2-0 PET; PET 2-1 UCL)	
14	Petrolul Ploiești	34	11	7	16	41	45	−4	40	
15	Foresta Suceava	34	10	9	15	32	41	−9	39	
16	Chindia Târgoviște (R)	34	10	8	16	40	67	−27	38	Relegation to Divizia B
17	Sportul Studențesc București (R)	34	5	4	25	32	65	−33	19	Relegation to Divizia B
18	Jiul Petroşani (R)	34	3	1	30	19	116	−97	10	Relegation to Divizia B

Source: LT (in Romanian)
Rules for classification: 1) points; 2) head-to-head points; 3) head-to-head goal difference; 4) head-to-head goals scored; 5) goal difference; 6) number of goals scored.
(C) Champions; (R) Relegated

=== Positions by round ===
Team ╲ Round	1	2	3	4	5	6	7	8	9	10	11	12	13	14	15	16	17	18	19	20	21	22	23	24	25	26	27	28	29	30	31	32	33	34
Argeș Pitești	5	4	4	3	2	1	1	1	1	5	5	5	5	5	5	6	5	5	5	5	5	5	5	5	5	5	5	4	3	3	3	3	3	3
Bacău	8	11	7	9	11	11	12	12	13	15	16	16	16	17	17	17	17	17	17	16	14	16	15	15	14	12	13	13	12	12	12	11	12	10
Reșița	3	5	5	6	6	7	7	7	7	8	7	6	7	8	8	7	8	8	7	6	6	6	7	7	7	7	7	7	8	7	7	8	8	7
Ceahlăul Piatra Neamț	10	12	15	10	12	12	9	9	11	9	13	10	10	11	10	10	10	10	10	9	9	8	9	9	9	9	10	9	10	9	9	9	9	9
Universitatea Craiova	6	10	6	8	7	6	6	6	6	6	6	8	8	7	6	5	6	7	8	8	8	9	8	8	8	8	8	8	7	8	8	7	7	8
Dinamo București	12	16	12	14	9	8	8	8	8	7	8	7	6	6	7	8	7	6	6	7	7	7	6	6	6	6	6	6	6	6	6	6	6	6
Farul Constanța	15	14	16	12	14	15	15	16	16	14	12	14	13	13	14	14	12	11	12	13	12	12	12	10	10	10	9	10	9	10	11	12	11	12
Foresta Fălticeni	13	15	13	16	10	10	10	11	9	11	11	13	12	12	13	13	15	15	14	14	15	15	14	14	15	15	12	14	13	14	14	15	16	15
Gloria Bistrița	1	8	10	7	8	9	11	10	12	10	10	9	11	10	11	12	13	12	13	12	13	13	13	11	11	11	11	11	14	11	10	10	10	11
Jiul Petroşani	18	18	18	18	18	18	18	18	18	18	18	18	18	18	18	18	18	18	18	18	18	18	18	18	18	18	18	18	18	18	18	18	18	18
Oțelul Galați	2	1	1	1	1	2	3	3	2	1	1	1	2	1	2	1	3	2	2	3	3	3	3	3	3	3	4	5	5	4	4	4	4	4
Petrolul Ploiești	16	13	14	11	13	13	14	13	10	12	9	12	9	9	9	9	9	9	9	10	10	11	11	13	13	13	14	12	11	13	13	13	13	14
Național București	4	2	2	2	4	4	2	2	5	2	4	3	4	4	4	4	4	4	4	4	4	4	4	4	4	4	3	3	4	5	5	5	5	5
Rapid București	11	6	8	5	5	5	5	5	4	4	3	4	3	2	1	2	1	3	3	2	2	2	2	2	2	2	2	2	1	1	1	2	1	2
Sportul Studențesc București	17	17	17	17	17	17	17	15	14	13	14	11	14	14	15	15	14	14	15	17	17	17	17	17	17	17	17	17	17	17	17	17	17	17
Steaua București	7	3	3	4	3	3	4	4	3	3	2	2	1	3	3	3	2	1	1	1	1	1	1	1	1	1	1	1	2	2	2	1	2	1
Chindia Târgoviște	9	7	9	13	15	16	16	17	17	17	17	17	17	16	16	16	16	16	16	15	16	14	16	16	16	16	16	16	15	16	16	16	15	16
Universitatea Cluj	14	9	11	15	16	14	13	14	15	16	15	15	15	15	12	11	11	13	11	11	11	10	10	12	12	14	15	15	16	15	15	14	14	13

Source: LT (in Romanian)

=== Results ===
Home \ Away	ARG	BAC	RES	CEA	UCR	DIN	FAR	FOR	GBI	JIU	OȚE	PET	NAT	RAP	SPO	STE	CHI	UCL
Argeș Pitești	—	4–0	2–1	1–0	1–0	2–1	2–0	2–1	3–0	1–0	1–1	2–0	0–0	0–3	0–0	3–2	2–1	0–2
Bacău	5–3	—	0–1	2–0	0–1	3–0	1–0	0–0	0–0	3–0	0–1	2–0	2–2	1–0	1–0	1–1	1–1	2–0
Reșița	2–1	1–1	—	5–1	2–1	0–0	2–1	2–0	3–1	4–1	3–0	2–0	1–0	1–6	2–1	0–2	6–1	2–0
Ceahlăul Piatra Neamț	2–0	1–0	1–0	—	3–2	2–1	1–0	2–1	2–0	6–1	0–0	0–0	1–3	2–1	3–1	1–2	2–2	1–0
Universitatea Craiova	1–2	0–2	1–1	4–1	—	2–1	4–1	2–0	4–0	7–0	0–2	2–1	5–1	2–2	1–0	1–2	4–0	2–0
Dinamo București	2–0	6–2	1–1	2–0	3–0	—	5–3	2–0	4–3	7–1	2–0	3–0	4–2	0–2	2–0	1–3	4–1	2–1
Farul Constanța	1–1	0–3	1–1	1–0	2–1	2–1	—	1–0	4–2	3–0	1–0	1–0	1–0	0–1	3–1	2–2	1–0	1–3
Foresta Fălticeni	1–2	2–0	2–1	1–1	0–1	3–1	0–2	—	3–0	1–0	1–0	1–0	0–0	1–1	4–2	0–2	2–0	0–0
Gloria Bistrița	3–2	3–1	4–1	2–1	2–0	3–2	4–1	0–0	—	3–0	0–3	2–1	3–1	2–3	3–0	0–1	1–1	2–2
Jiul Petroşani	0–5	3–2	1–1	1–4	2–5	2–5	1–0	0–3	0–5	—	0–2	0–2	1–2	2–6	1–0	0–2	0–1	0–4
Oțelul Galați	1–0	1–2	3–1	2–0	1–1	1–0	1–0	3–0	3–0	7–0	—	2–0	3–2	1–0	4–0	0–2	2–1	3–0
Petrolul Ploiești	2–3	2–2	2–1	3–0	2–1	1–2	1–2	1–1	4–1	2–0	1–1	—	1–1	1–1	2–1	1–2	4–1	2–1
Național București	0–0	2–0	2–0	5–1	3–2	1–1	2–0	3–0	2–0	3–0	2–0	1–0	—	1–2	2–1	1–4	5–1	1–0
Rapid București	1–2	2–1	1–0	0–0	2–1	2–0	3–0	3–0	2–1	5–0	1–0	2–1	2–1	—	1–0	1–1	3–0	2–0
Sportul Studențesc București	0–2	3–0	1–4	0–0	1–3	1–0	4–0	2–2	2–3	3–1	0–1	1–2	0–1	0–4	—	1–1	4–1	0–1
Steaua București	3–1	1–0	5–1	3–1	2–1	5–0	1–0	3–1	5–2	5–1	1–3	0–1	2–4	2–2	4–1	—	5–0	2–1
Chindia Târgoviște	2–4	1–1	2–1	0–3	2–1	1–0	1–1	1–0	1–1	4–0	4–2	1–1	2–0	0–2	2–1	1–2	—	2–0
Universitatea Cluj	0–2	0–0	3–1	3–3	2–2	0–1	3–0	1–1	1–0	3–0	2–0	2–0	0–1	0–1	4–0	2–3	1–1	—

Source: LT (in Romanian)
Legend: Blue = home team win; Yellow = draw; Red = away team win.

== Top goalscorers ==
Position	Player	Club	Goals
1	Vasile Oană	Gloria Bistriţa	21
1	Constantin Barbu	Argeş Piteşti	21
3	Cătălin Munteanu	Steaua București	17
4	Ionel Dănciulescu	Steaua București	14
4	Valentin Ștefan	Oțelul Galați	14
4	Ionuț Luțu	Universitatea Craiova	14
7	Lucian Marinescu	Rapid București	13

== Champion squad ==
Steaua București

Goalkeepers: Zoltan Ritli (30 / 0); Daniel Gherasim (3 / 0); Eugen Nae (1 / 0).
Defenders: Laurențiu Reghecampf (30 / 1); Valeriu Răchită (27 / 3); Marius Baciu (13 / 2); Tiberiu Csik (20 / 1); Erik Lincar (16 / 0); Adrian Matei (28 / 3); Iulian Miu (29 / 1); Roland Nagy (4 / 0).
Midfielders: Marius Coporan (11 / 0); Mugurel Cornățeanu (6 / 0); Lavi Hrib (22 / 1); Marius Sebastian Luca (8 / 3); Damian Militaru (27 / 2); Cătălin Munteanu (33 / 17); Narcis Răducan (16 / 1); Laurențiu Roșu (14 / 3); Iosif Rotariu (26 / 7); Dennis Șerban (24 / 4).
Forwards: Cristian Ciocoiu (28 / 10); Ionel Dănciulescu (25 / 14); Marius Lăcătuș (31 / 8).
(league appearances and goals listed in brackets)

Manager: Mihai Stoichiță.

== See also ==
- 1997–98 Divizia B
- 1997–98 Divizia C
- 1997–98 Divizia D
- 1997–98 Cupa României
