= Erik Lincar =

Romanian footballer and manager

Personal information
- Full name: Erik Augustin Lincar
- Date of birth: 16 October 1978 (age 48)
- Place of birth: Oradea, Romania
- Height: 1.80 m (5 ft 11 in)
- Position: Midfielder

Team information
- Current team: Bihor Oradea (head coach)

Youth career
- –1994: Bihor Oradea
- 1994–1996: Viitorul Oradea
- 1996–1997: Bordeaux

Senior career*
Years	Team	Apps	(Gls)
1997–2002	Steaua București	105	(7)
2002–2003	Panathinaikos	10	(0)
2003–2004	Akratitos	23	(2)
2005–2006	Amkar Perm	28	(2)
2006–2007	Național București	16	(0)
2007–2008	Concordia Chiajna	0	(0)
2008–2009	Prefab Modelu	0	(0)
Total		182	(11)

International career
1999–2000	Romania	5	(0)

Managerial career
- 2008–2009: Prefab Modelu (player/assistant)
- 2009–2010: Inter Clinceni
- 2010–2011: Callatis Mangalia
- 2011–2012: FC Hunedoara
- 2012: Damila Măciuca
- 2013: Delta Tulcea
- 2013: Universitatea Craiova
- 2014: CSM Râmnicu Vâlcea
- 2015: Concordia Chiajna (assistant)
- 2016–2017: Luceafărul Oradea
- 2017: Academica Clinceni
- 2017–2018: Juventus București (assistant)
- 2018–2019: Turris Turnu Măgurele
- 2019: Concordia Chiajna
- 2020: Turris Turnu Măgurele
- 2021–2022: Universitatea Cluj
- 2023–2024: Concordia Chiajna
- 2025–: Bihor Oradea
- * Club domestic league appearances and goals

Erik Augustin Lincar (born 16 October 1978) is a Romanian football manager and former player, currently in charge of Liga II club Bihor Oradea.

== Club career ==
Lincar was born in Oradea and debuted in Divizia A with Steaua București in 1997, having joined Steaua from the Girondins de Bordeaux youth team. Steaua won the league title during his first season with the club, took the cup title in 1999 and the league title again in 2001. In 2002, he headed overseas to spend two unsuccessful seasons in Greece at Panathinaikos and Akratitos. After playing for a while in Russia for FC Amkar Perm, Lincar returns to Romania. He played for Prefab Modelu where he is also an assistant manager. In 2011, he was manager of FC Hunedoara for six matches being dismissed on 26 September 2011.

== International career ==
Lincar earned five caps for the Romania national team in 1999 and 2000, and was an unused substitute at Euro 2000.

== Career statistics ==
Appearances and goals by national team and year
National team	Year	Apps	Goals
Romania	1999	1	0
Romania	2000	4	0
Total		5	0

== Honours ==
=== Player ===
Steaua București

- Divizia A: 1997–98, 2000–01
- Cupa României: 1998–99
- Supercupa României: 1998, 2001

=== Coach ===
Callatis Mangalia

- Liga III: 2010–11

Damila Măciuca

- Liga III: 2011–12

Turris Turnu Măgurele

- Liga III: 2018–19
