= Cristian Ciocoiu =

Romanian footballer

Personal information
- Date of birth: 23 November 1975 (age 50)
- Place of birth: Bacău, Romania
- Height: 1.87 m (6 ft 2 in)
- Position: Forward

Team information
- Current team: FC Bacău (president)

Youth career
- –1993: Selena Bacău

Senior career*
Years	Team	Apps	(Gls)
1993–1996	FC Bacău	55	(13)
1996–2001	Steaua București	126	(32)
2001–2004	FCM Bacău	78	(13)
2004–2005	Steaua București	4	(0)
Total		263	(58)

International career
1994–1998	Romania U21	12	(3)

Managerial career
- 2008: Știința Bacău (general director)
- 2009–2011: FCM Bacău (general director)
- 2015: SC Bacău (president)
- 2015–: FC Bacău (president)
- * Club domestic league appearances and goals

Cristian Ciocoiu (born 23 November 1975) is a former Romanian professional footballer who played as a forward, currently he is the president of Liga II club FC Bacău.

== Post-retirement ==
After retirement he went back to his hometown Bacău and helped at the reconstruction of the local football, as the president of SC Bacău and FC Bacău, the second one being a club that Ciocoiu founded.

== Honours ==
Selena Bacău

- Divizia B: 1994–95

Steaua București

- Divizia A: 1996–97, 1997–98, 2000–01, 2004–05
- Cupa României: 1996–97, 1998–99
- Supercupa României: 1998
