= Daniel Pancu =

Romanian footballer

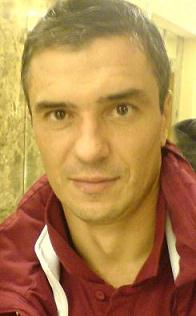
- Pancu in 2011

Personal information
- Full name: Daniel Gabriel Pancu
- Date of birth: 17 August 1977 (age 49)
- Place of birth: Iași, Romania
- Height: 1.84 m (6 ft 0 in)
- Positions: Forward; attacking midfielder

Team information
- Current team: Rapid București (head coach)

Youth career
- 1986–1994: Politehnica Iași

Senior career*
Years	Team	Apps	(Gls)
1994–1996	Politehnica Iași	55	(4)
1997–1999	Rapid București	77	(23)
1999–2000	Cesena	36	(3)
2000–2002	Rapid București	45	(28)
2002–2006	Beşiktaş	80	(16)
2006	→ Rapid București (loan)	13	(2)
2006–2007	Bursaspor	32	(3)
2008	Rapid București	8	(2)
2008–2009	Terek Grozny	33	(10)
2010	CSKA Sofia	7	(2)
2010	Vaslui	5	(0)
2011–2015	Rapid București	96	(21)
2015–2016	Voluntari	24	(5)
2017–2018	Rapid București	23	(18)
Total		534	(137)

International career
1994	Romania U16	4	(0)
1995	Romania U18	2	(0)
1996–1997	Romania U21	8	(2)
2001–2005	Romania	27	(9)

Managerial career
- 2017: Voluntari (assistant)
- 2017–2018: Rapid București (technical director)
- 2018–2020: Rapid București
- 2020: Rapid București (president)
- 2020–2021: Politehnica Iași
- 2022: Voluntari (academy director)
- 2022–2023: Romania U20
- 2023–2025: Romania U21
- 2025–2026: CFR Cluj
- 2026–: Rapid București
- * Club domestic league appearances and goals

Daniel Gabriel Pancu (Romanian pronunciation: [daniˈel gabriˈel– ˈpaŋku]; born 17 August 1977) is a Romanian professional football manager and former player, who is currently in charge of Liga I club Rapid București.

== Playing career ==
Pancu began his playing career at Politehnica Iași. He made his debut in Divizia A in 1995. In the winter of 1996 he was transferred to Rapid București for the sum of US$200,000. This was, at that time, the highest fee ever paid for a Iași player. After two and a half seasons, he moved to Cesena, in the Italian Serie B, for US$1,200,000. After a year, Cesena was relegated from the Serie B and Pancu returned to Rapid for US$800,000, where he stayed for two seasons. During this tenure he gained the nickname "the Giulești Ronaldo".

In 2002, he was bought by Beşiktaş, at the request of the manager who discovered him, Mircea Lucescu, for a fee of US$2,250,000. It was at Beşiktaş that Lucescu turned Pancu from striker into central midfielder with impressive results. In the winter of 2005–06, he returned to Rapid on loan with the possibility of becoming a permanent transfer in the summer. He was then bought by Bursaspor, but returned to Rapid again in the spring of 2008, scoring on his first appearance. In July 2008 he moved to Terek Grozny and left the club on 30 November 2009.

On 11 December 2009, it was announced in the Bulgarian media that CSKA Sofia had an interest in signing the midfielder. On 12 January 2010, CSKA signed Pancu on a one-a-half-year deal. Pancu made his official debut for CSKA Sofia in the 3–2 win against Lokomotiv Plovdiv in Sofia, again scoring on his debut.

After a short spell in Bulgaria at CSKA Sofia, Pancu returned to Romanian football later in 2010 to play for FC Vaslui, but had a difficult time breaking into the first eleven with strong competition from Wesley and Mike Temwanjera. During the summer transfer window of 2011 he re-signed yet again for Rapid București.

On the 28th gameweek of the 2004–05 Süper Lig season, during a derby match against Fenerbahçe, with the score at 2–3, Pancu replaced Óscar Córdoba, after the goalkeeper received a red card and Beşiktaş had already used all their substitutes. After conceding a penalty, Pancu kept Fenerbahçe at bay until Koray scored the fourth goal for Beşiktaş in the fifth minute of added time. Beşiktaş thus sealed a sensational away win over their rivals at Kadiköy Stadium. Pancu was given the nickname "Kadıköy Panteri" (the panther of Kadıköy) and dressed in a regular goalkeeper's jersey with the number "1" the following season. He later stated that he felt uncomfortable being labelled as a goalkeeper, as his native playing position was a forward.

== Managerial career ==
On 2 October 2018, Daniel Pancu was appointed as Rapid’s new manager. He obtained the promotion from Liga III to Liga II after losing only 1 game. In 2020, he was named President of Rapid București.

== Playing statistics ==
Appearances and goals by national team and year
National team	Year	Apps	Goals
Romania	2001	3	0
Romania	2002	6	2
Romania	2003	9	2
Romania	2004	5	4
Romania	2005	4	1
Total		27	9

Scores and results list Romania's goal tally first, score column indicates score after each Pancu goal.

List of international goals scored by Daniel Pancu
No.	Date	Venue	Opponent	Score	Result	Competition
1	27 March 2002	Stadionul Gheorghe Hagi, Constanța, Romania	Ukraine	2–0	4–1	Friendly
2	27 March 2002	Stadionul Gheorghe Hagi, Constanța, Romania	Ukraine	3–0	4–1	Friendly
3	6 September 2003	Stadionul Astra, Ploiești, Romania	Luxembourg	2–0	4–0	UEFA Euro 2004 qualifying
4	10 September 2003	Parken Stadium, Copenhagen, Denmark	Denmark	2–1	2–2	UEFA Euro 2004 qualifying
5	31 March 2004	Hampden Park, Glasgow, Scotland	Scotland	2–0	2–1	Friendly
6	4 September 2004	Stadionul Ion Oblemenco, Craiova, Romania	Macedonia	1–0	2–1	2006 FIFA World Cup qualification
7	8 September 2004	Estadi Comunal d'Andorra la Vella, Andorra la Vella, Andorra	Andorra	2–0	5–1	2006 FIFA World Cup qualification
8	8 September 2004	Estadi Comunal d'Andorra la Vella, Andorra la Vella, Andorra	Andorra	5–1	5–1	2006 FIFA World Cup qualification
9	9 February 2005	GSZ Stadium, Larnaca, Cyprus	Slovakia	1–1	2–2	Friendly

== Managerial statistics ==
As of 7 November 2026

Managerial record by team and tenure
Team	From	To	Record							
Team	From	To	G	W	D	L	GF	GA	GD	Win %
(Romania) Rapid București	2 October 2018	10 March 2020	48	31	9	8	120	37	+83	64.58
(Romania) Politehnica Iași	10 August 2020	28 January 2021	21	5	3	13	18	44	−26	23.81
Romania U20	16 August 2022	25 July 2023	6	1	1	4	5	10	−5	16.67
Romania U21	25 July 2023	30 June 2025	16	9	1	6	27	17	+10	56.25
(Romania) CFR Cluj	1 November 2025	27 May 2026	28	17	7	4	41	25	+16	60.71
(Romania) Rapid București	27 May 2026	present	17	10	5	2	26	14	+12	58.82
Total			136	73	26	37	237	147	+90	53.68

== Honours ==
=== Player ===
Rapid București

- Divizia A: 1998–99
- Cupa României: 1997–98, 2001–02, 2005–06
- Supercupa României runner-up: 1998
- Liga IV – Bucharest: 2017–18

Beşiktaş

- Süper Lig: 2002–03

=== Coach ===
Rapid București

- Liga III: 2018–19
