= Laurențiu Roșu =

Romanian footballer and manager

Personal information
- Full name: Laurențiu Dumitru Roșu
- Date of birth: 26 October 1975 (age 51)
- Place of birth: Iaşi, Romania
- Height: 1.75 m (5 ft 9 in)
- Position: Winger

Team information
- Current team: Al-Arabi (assistant)

Youth career
- –1993: Politehnica Iaşi

Senior career*
Years	Team	Apps	(Gls)
1993–2000	Steaua București	159	(45)
2000–2004	Numancia	125	(27)
2004–2008	Recreativo	97	(17)
2008–2009	Cádiz	12	(2)
Total		393	(91)

International career
1998–2007	Romania	38	(5)

Managerial career
- 2010: Vaslui (assistant)
- 2012–2014: Petrolul Ploiești (assistant)
- 2014–2015: Steaua București (assistant)
- 2016–2017: UTA Arad
- 2017–2018: Mioveni
- 2018–2019: Romania U18
- 2019–2020: Romania U19
- 2021–2022: Al-Ittihad (assistant)
- 2023–2024: Damac (assistant)
- 2025: Al-Kholood (assistant)
- 2025–: Al-Arabi (assistant)
- * Club domestic league appearances and goals

Laurențiu Dumitru Roșu (born 26 October 1975) is a Romanian professional football manager and former player, currently assistant coach at Qatar Stars League club Al-Arabi.

After four seasons at Steaua București, he spent nine years as a professional in Spain – eight in the two major divisions, where he amassed totals of 222 games and 45 goals – representing three clubs, mostly Numancia and Recreativo.

Roșu earned nearly 40 caps for Romania, representing the nation at Euro 2000.

== Club career ==
Born in Iaşi, Roșu started playing football with local Politehnica Iași. Not yet 18, he moved to country giants FC Steaua București where he would spend the following seven years, winning five Divizia A championships.

In his first season, Roșu only featured in four league matches, but after his direct competitor was sold he blossomed into a top-flight player, scoring six goals in 31 games in the 1994–95 campaign and adding a combined 27 in his last two as the team finished third on both occasions. Previously, in 1997–98, as Steaua again lifted the league trophy (with three goals from the player), it became the first club in the country after World War II to conquer the national title for six consecutive years.

With Roșu on board, Steaua became the first Romanian side to reach the UEFA Champions League group stage phase, in the 1994–95 edition, and he left in 2000 with 159 matches played in the first division, all with the same team. He also won three Romanian Cups, adding 43 appearances and four goals in European competition.

Roșu moved to CD Numancia for 2000–01, joining compatriot Constantin Barbu who had arrived the previous season. In his first year in Spain he scored eight times– including a hat-trick against Real Madrid– but the Sorians were relegated from La Liga. After a further three years, all in the second level, he signed for Recreativo de Huelva, scoring 19 goals in his first two seasons including ten in 2005–06 as the Andalusians returned to the top division after a three-year absence.

After managing to score only three times in 2006–07 and appear in four matches in the following season, Roșu moved to neighbours Cádiz CF, recently relegated to the third level. He was released after a sole campaign, having contributed sparingly to their immediate promotion.

On 25 March 2008, Roșu was decorated by the president of Romania, Traian Băsescu, for having qualified to Euro 2008 with "Medalia Meritul Sportiv" – (the "Sportive Merit" medal) class III. He started a managerial career in 2010, notably working as an assistant with FC Vaslui and FC Petrolul Ploiești.

For 2016–17, Roșu was appointed head coach of Liga II's FC UTA Arad. The following season, he was in charge of CS Mioveni of the same league.

== International career ==
Roșu made his debut for the Romania national team on 10 October 1998 against Portugal, in an UEFA Euro 2000 qualifier (1–0 away win), and represented his country at the tournament's final stages. He went on to play 38 internationals and score five goals, including one against Bulgaria in a 2–2 home draw for the Euro 2008 qualifying phase, on 2 September 2006.

== Career statistics ==
Appearances and goals by national team and year
National team	Year	Apps	Goals
Romania	1998	1	0
Romania	1999	7	2
Romania	2000	11	1
Romania	2001	5	0
Romania	2002	1	0
Romania	2003	0	0
Romania	2004	0	0
Romania	2005	4	1
Romania	2006	4	1
Romania	2007	5	0
Total		38	5

Scores and results list Romania's goal tally first, score column indicates score after each Roșu goal.

List of international goals scored by Laurențiu Roșu
No.	Date	Venue	Opponent	Score	Result	Competition
1	9 June 1999	Stadionul Ghencea, Bucharest, Romania	Azerbaijan	4–0	4–0	UEFA Euro 2000 Qual.
2	19 September 1999	Rheinpark Stadion, Vaduz, Liechtenstein	Liechtenstein	1–0	3–0	UEFA Euro 2000 Qual.
3	2 February 2000	Pafiako Stadium, Paphos, Cyprus	Latvia	1–0	2–0	Friendly
4	16 November 2005	Stadionul Ghencea, Bucharest, Romania	Nigeria	3–0	3–0	Friendly
5	2 September 2006	Stadionul Farul, Constanța, Romania	Bulgaria	1–0	2–2	UEFA Euro 2008 qualifying

== Honours ==
Steaua București

- Divizia A: 1993–94, 1994–95, 1995–96, 1996–97, 1997–98
- Cupa României: 1995–96, 1996–97, 1998–99
- Supercupa României: 1994, 1995, 1998

Recreativo

- Segunda División: 2005–06

Cádiz

- Segunda División B: 2008–09
