= Mihai Stoichiță =

Romanian footballer and manager

Personal information
- Full name: Mihai Cristian Stoichiță
- Date of birth: 10 May 1954 (age 72)
- Place of birth: Bucharest, Romania
- Position: Midfielder

Team information
- Current team: Romania (technical director)

Youth career
- 1971–1973: Dinamo București

Senior career*
Years	Team	Apps	(Gls)
1973–1974	Jiul Petroşani	37	(2)
1974–1975	Autobuzul București		
1975–1981	Jiul Petroşani	178	(16)
1981–1983	Progresul București	15	(2)
1983–1984	CS Târgovişte	21	(2)
1985–1986	Progresul București		
1986–1988	Gloria Buzău	39	(5)
Total		290	(27)

International career
1974	Romania U–21	1	(0)

Managerial career
- 1988–1990: Naţional București (assistant)
- 1991–1992: Callatis Mangalia
- 1992–1993: Rocar București
- 1993–1994: Dinamo București (assistant)
- 1994–1997: Steaua București (assistant)
- 1997–1998: Steaua București
- 1999–2000: Național București
- 2000: Litex Lovech
- 2001: Panama
- 2001–2002: Sheriff Tiraspol
- 2002–2003: Ankaragücü
- 2003–2004: Armenia & Pyunik Yerevan
- 2004: Farul Constanţa
- 2005: Oţelul Galaţi
- 2005–2006: Kuwait
- 2007–2008: Aris Limassol
- 2008–2009: Al Salmiya
- 2009: AEL Limassol
- 2009–2010: Steaua București
- 2010: Astra Ploiești
- 2010–2011: AEL Limassol
- 2011: Mioveni
- 2011–2012: Apollon Limassol
- 2012: Steaua București
- 2012–2013: Sheriff Tiraspol
- 2013–2014: Al-Salmiya
- 2015–2016: Petrolul Ploiești
- 2017–: Romania (technical director)
- * Club domestic league appearances and goals

Mihai Cristian Stoichiță (born 10 May 1954) is a Romanian football manager who last coached Liga I side Petrolul Ploiești.

== Coaching career ==
Stoichiță joined Steaua București in 1994 as an assistant coach under Dumitru Dumitriu. When Dumitriu stepped down at the beginning of the 1997–98 season, Stoichiță became head coach. He led the team to the league title, and followed this success by winning the 1998 Supercupa României.

Stoichiță led Panama to a fourth-place ranking at the 2001 UNCAF Nations Cup held in Honduras. The Kuwait Football Association hired him in 2006 to coach its national football team. Stoichiţă's was tasked to earn one point from the away match at Uzbekistan to qualify for a two-legged play-off against Bahrain in the World Cup Qualifiers. Despite leading with two goals after the first 30 minutes, Bahrain lost 2-3 and was eliminated from the World Cup.

On 18 September 2009, two hours after Cristiano Bergodi was sacked, he was announced by Steaua București's owner, Gigi Becali, as the new manager of the team. He resigned in May 2010, after finishing the 2009–10 season on the fourth position. In June 2010, Stoichiţă joined Astra Ploiești but was sacked after only a couple of months due to poor results. He returned to Cyprus, for a second spell at AEL Limassol.

In September 2011, Stoichiţă returned to Romania to help newly promoted CS Mioveni in their attempt to avoid relegation, but an offer from Apollon Limassol made him move back to Cyprus. At the beginning of March 2012, he ended his contract and returned to Romania. On 27 March 2012, he returned to Steaua, signing a contract until the end of the season. His contract wasn't renewed because he failed to win the title with Steaua.

== Honours ==
Player

Jiul Petroşani

- Romanian Cup: 1
  - 1974

Manager

Steaua București

- Romanian League: 1
  - 1998
- Romanian Super Cup: 1
  - 1998

Sheriff Tiraspol

- Moldovan National Division: 1
  - 2002
- Moldovan Cup: 1
  - 2002

Pyunik Yerevan

- Armenian Premier League: 1
  - 2004
- Armenian Cup: 1
  - 2004
- Armenian Super Cup: 1
  - 2004
