= 1998–99 Cupa României =

Tournament details
- Country: Romania

Final positions
- Champions: AFC Steaua București
- Runners-up: Rapid București

The 1998–99 Cupa României was the 61st edition of Romania's most prestigious football cup competition.

The title was won by AFC Steaua București against Rapid București.

== Format ==
The competition is an annual knockout tournament.

First round proper matches are played on the ground of the lowest ranked team, then from the second round proper the matches are played on a neutral location.

If a match is drawn after 90 minutes, the game goes into extra time. If the match is still tied, the result is decided by penalty kicks.

In the quarter-finals and semi-finals, each tie is played as a two legs.

From the first edition, the teams from Divizia A entered in competition in sixteen finals, rule which remained till today.

== First round proper ==
Team 1	Score	Team 2
21 October 1998
Crişul Aleşd (Div. C)	0–5	(Div. A) Oțelul Galați
Unirea Botoşani (Div. C)	1–2	(Div. A) Gloria Bistrița
Rocar București (Div. B)	2–2 (a.e.t.) (2-3 p)	(Div. A) CSM Reșița
Sportul Studențesc București (Div. B)	2–0	(Div. A) Olimpia Satu Mare
Universitatea Cluj (Div. A)	3–2	(Div. A) Foresta Suceava
Farul Constanța (Div. A)	1–4	(Div. A) Petrolul Ploiești
Unirea Dej (Div. B)	2–3	(Div. A) FC U Craiova
Nitramonia Făgăraş (Div. B)	0–3	(Div. A) FC Onești
Cimentul Fieni (Div. B)	1–0	(Div. A) Argeș Pitești
Diplomatic Focșani (Div. C)	1–4	(Div. A) Rapid București
Flacăra Horezu (Div. C)	0–1	(Div. A) Ceahlăul Piatra Neamț
Midia Năvodari (Div. B)	0–3	(Div. A) AFC Steaua București
UM Timișoara (Div. C)	2–0	(Div. A) Astra Ploieşti
ASA 1962 Târgu Mureș (Div. B)	0–1	(Div. A) Dinamo București
FC Drobeta-Turnu Severin (Div. B)	1–2	(Div. A) FCM Bacău
Minaur Zlatna (Div. C)	0–3	(Div. A) Naţional București

== Second round proper ==
Team 1	Score	Team 2
18 November 1998
CSM Reșița	0–2	Gloria Bistrița
AFC Steaua București	3–0	Universitatea Cluj
Oțelul Galați	1–0	Sportul Studenţesc București
Rapid București	3–0	Cimentul Fieni
Dinamo București	3–0	Ceahlăul Piatra Neamț
Petrolul Ploiești	3–2	FC U Craiova
FCM Bacău	4–3	FC Onești
Naţional București	0–2	UM Timișoara

== Quarter-finals ==
The matches were played on 2 December and 9 December 1998.

Team 1	Agg.	Team 2	1st leg	2nd leg
FCM Bacău	2–1	Oțelul Galați	2–0	0–1
Gloria Bistrița	2–3	Rapid București	1–1	1–2
AFC Steaua București	6–2	Petrolul Ploiești	5–1	1–1
UM Timișoara	0–3	Dinamo București	0–1	0–2

== Semi-finals ==
The matches were played on 14 April and 5 May 1999.

Team 1	Agg.	Team 2	1st leg	2nd leg
Rapid București	2–2	FCM Bacău	1–0	1–2
Dinamo București	2–5	AFC Steaua București	1–2	1–3

== Final ==
16 June 1999
21:00 EEST

Steaua București	2–2 (a.e.t.)	Rapid București
Ciocoiu 68'; Belodedici 90'	Report	Barbu 71', 81'
Penalties
Roşu (penalty scored); Militaru (penalty scored); Trică (penalty scored); Lincar (penalty scored)	4–2	(penalty scored) Şumudică; (penalty scored) Iencsi; (penalty missed) Bundea; (penalty missed) Pancu

Stadionul Naţional, Bucharest
Attendance: 50,000
Referee: Marc Batta (France)
