= 1996–97 Cupa României =

Tournament details
- Country: Romania

Final positions
- Champions: Steaua București
- Runners-up: Naţional București

The 1996–97 Cupa României was the 59th edition of Romania's most prestigious football cup competition.

The title was won by Steaua București against Naţional București.

== Format ==
The competition is an annual knockout tournament.

First round proper matches are played on the ground of the lowest ranked team, then from the second round proper the matches are played on a neutral location.

If a match is drawn after 90 minutes, the game goes into extra time. If the match is still tied, the result is decided by penalty kicks.

From the first edition, the teams from Divizia A entered in competition in sixteen finals, rule which remained till today.

== First round proper ==
Team 1	Score	Team 2
29 November 1996
FC Oneşti (Div. B)	0–2	(Div. A) Steaua București
30 November 1996
FC Brașov (Div. A)	3–0	(Div. A) Sportul Studenţesc București
Rocar București (Div. B)	0–3	(Div. A) FC U Craiova
Dunărea Călărași (Div. B)	3–1	(Div. A) Chindia Târgoviște
Electroputere Craiova (Div. B)	0–2	(Div. A) Petrolul Ploiești
Midia Năvodari (Div. C)	1–0 (a.e.t.)	(Div. A) Argeș Pitești
Petrolul Moinești (Div. B)	0–2	(Div. A) Universitatea Cluj
Viitorul Oradea (Div. C)	0–3	(Div. A) Politehnica Timișoara
Ceahlăul Piatra Neamț (Div. A)	1–0	(Div. A) Jiul Petroșani
Dacia Piteşti (Div. B)	1–2	(Div. A) Dinamo București
Danubiana Ploieşti (Div. B)	1–2	(Div. A) Farul Constanța
CSM Reșița (Div. B)	1–0	(Div. A) Gloria Bistrița
Olimpia Satu Mare (Div. B)	3–0	(Div. A) FCM Bacău
Inter Sibiu (Div. B)	1–0	(Div. A) Rapid București
UM Timișoara (Div. C)	2–4	(Div. A) Oțelul Galați
ASA 1962 Târgu Mureș (Div. B)	1–3	(Div. A) Naţional București

== Second round proper ==
Team 1	Score	Team 2
7 May 1997
Politehnica Timișoara	0–4	FC Brașov
Naţional București	1–0 (a.e.t.)	Inter Sibiu
Petrolul Ploiești	3–0	Dunărea Călărași
Dinamo București	1–1 (a.e.t.) (7-6 p)	Oțelul Galați
Steaua București	5–0	Midia Năvodari
Farul Constanța	1–1 (a.e.t.) (2-3 p)	CSM Reșița
Ceahlăul Piatra Neamț	1–2 (a.e.t.)	Universitatea Cluj
FC U Craiova	0–0 (a.e.t.) (3-2 p)	Olimpia Satu Mare

== Quarter-finals ==
Team 1	Score	Team 2
14 May 1997
Dinamo București	4–1	CSM Reșița
Naţional București	3–1	Universitatea Cluj
Steaua București	3–2 (a.e.t.)	Petrolul Ploiești
FC U Craiova	2–0	FC Brașov

== Semi-finals ==
Team 1	Score	Team 2
21 May 1997
Naţional București	2–1	Dinamo București
Steaua București	2–1	FC U Craiova

== Final ==
4 June 1997
21:00 EEST

Steaua București	4–2	Naţional București
Ilie 2', 5', 30' (pen.); Ciocoiu 86'	Report	Dună 10'; Petre 89'

Stadionul Naţional, Bucharest
Attendance: 25,000
Referee: Sorin Corpodean (Romania)
