= 1999–2000 FC Dinamo București season =

FC Dinamo București
1999–2000 season
- Head coach: Cornel Dinu
- Divizia A: 1st
- Romanian Cup: Winners
- UEFA Cup: First round
- Top goalscorer: Adrian Mutu (18 goals)

The 1999–2000 season was FC Dinamo București's 51st season in Divizia A. Dinamo finished 1st in the league and he won the Romanian Cup. In the UEFA Cup, they played in first round.

== Players ==
=== Squad information ===
Squad at end of season

Note: Flags indicate national team as defined under FIFA eligibility rules; some limited exceptions apply. Players may hold more than one non-FIFA nationality.

No.	Pos.	Nation	Player
1	GK	ROU	Ștefan Preda
2	DF	ROU	Cornel Buta
3	DF	ROU	Liviu Ciobotariu
4	DF	ROU	Valentin Năstase
5	MF	ROU	Daniel Iftodi
6	DF	ROU	Gheorghe Mihali
7	FW	ROU	Adrian Mutu
8	MF	ROU	Florentin Petre
9	FW	ROU	Adrian Mihalcea
10	MF	ROU	Ionuț Lupescu
11	MF	ROU	Cătălin Hîldan
12	GK	MAR	Khalid Fouhami
15	FW	ROU	Ion Vlădoiu
14	DF	ROU	Tinel Petre
14	MF	ROU	Florin Cernat
16	FW	ROU	Marius Niculae
16	DF	ROU	Adrian Iordache
17	MF	ROU	Giani Kiriţă
18	MF	ROU	Gabriel Popescu

No.	Pos.	Nation	Player
18	MF	ROU	Cristian Vlad
19	DF	ROU	Cornel Dobre
19	FW	ROU	Claudiu Drăgan
20	DF	ROU	Daniel Florea
21	DF	ROU	Sorin Iodi
21	MF	ROU	Marius Coporan
22	FW	ROU	Bogdan Mara
23	MF	ROU	Daniel Timofte
24	DF	ROU	Iosif Tâlvan
26	FW	ROU	Bogdan Aldea
—	DF	ROU	Șerban Cristescu
—	DF	ROU	Laurenţiu Opriceană
—	DF	ROU	Mădălin Popa
—	DF	ROU	Marian Vătavu
—	MF	ROU	Cristian Constantin
—	MF	ROU	Răzvan Pădurețu
—	FW	ROU	Alexandru Bălțoi
—	FW	ROU	Constantin Stan

== League table ==
Pos	Team	Pld	W	D	L	GF	GA	GD	Pts	Qualification or relegation
1	Dinamo București (C)	34	27	3	4	93	40	+53	84	Qualification to Champions League second qualifying round
2	Rapid București	34	22	6	6	65	38	+27	72	Qualification to UEFA Cup qualifying round
3	Steaua București	34	18	3	13	62	56	+6	57 (Note: STE 3–0 CEA; CEA 0–2 STE)	
4	Ceahlăul Piatra Neamț	34	17	6	11	56	48	+8	57	Qualification to Intertoto Cup first round
5	Argeș Pitești	34	16	6	12	45	35	+10	54	
6	Gloria Bistrița	34	17	2	15	54	49	+5	53	
7	Bacău	34	15	6	13	40	39	+1	51	
8	Oțelul Galați	34	15	4	15	59	55	+4	49 (Note: OTE 2–0 PRO; PRO 1–1 OTE)	
9	Național București	34	15	4	15	61	44	+17	49	
10	Astra Ploiești	34	13	8	13	43	41	+2	47	
11	Petrolul Ploiești	34	14	5	15	48	55	−7	47	
12	Rocar București	34	15	2	17	52	52	0	47	
13	Universitatea Craiova	34	13	7	14	45	41	+4	46 (Note: CRA 1–0 BRA; BRA 0–1 CRA)	Qualification to UEFA Cup qualifying round
14	Brașov	34	14	4	16	53	43	+10	46	
15	Farul Constanța (R)	34	12	8	14	38	45	−7	44	Relegation to Divizia B
16	FC Onești (R)	34	9	3	22	37	92	−55	30	Relegation to Divizia B
17	CSM Reșița (R)	34	5	8	21	35	73	−38	23	Relegation to Divizia B
18	Extensiv Craiova (R)	34	4	5	25	26	66	−40	17	Relegation to Divizia B

Source: LT (in Romanian)
Rules for classification: 1) points; 2) head-to-head points; 3) head-to-head goal difference; 4) head-to-head goals scored; 5) goal difference; 6) number of goals scored.
(C) Champions; (R) Relegated

== Results ==
Dinamo's score comes first

=== Legend ===
Win	Draw	Loss

=== Divizia A ===
Divizia A 1999–2000 Winners
Dinamo București
15th Title

=== Cupa României ===
Round	Date	Opponent	Venue	Result	Goalscorers
R of 32	22 September 1999	Tractorul Brașov	A	4–1	
R of 16	13 October 1999	Rocar București	H	3–1	
QF	10 November 1999	Național București	H	3–2	
SF - 1st leg	15 March 2000	Oțelul Galați	A	2–0	
SF - 2nd leg	12 April 2000	Oțelul Galați	H	3–1	

== Final ==
13 May 2000
20:30 EEST

Dinamo București	2–0	Universitatea Craiova
Niculae 6' (pen.); Hîldan 89'	Report

Stadionul Naţional, Bucharest
Attendance: 55,000
Referee: Sorin Corpodean (Romania)

Cupa României 1999–00 winners
Dinamo București
8th title

=== UEFA Cup ===
12 August 1999
19:30

Mondercange (Luxembourg)	2–6	(Romania) Dinamo București
Christophe 38'; Neves 90'	Report	Lupescu 21' (pen.); Petre 28'; Mihalcea 49'; Mutu 51', 78'; Niculae 80'

Stade de la Frontière, Esch-sur-Alzette
Attendance: 850
Referee: Algirdas Dubinskas (Lithuania)
26 August 1999
20:00

Dinamo București (Romania)	7–0	(Luxembourg) Mondercange
Mutu 9', 20'; Niculae 22', 29', 74'; Fogel 71' (o.g.); Petre 89'	Report

Stadionul Dinamo, Bucharest
Attendance: 4,500
Referee: Charles Agius (Malta)

Dinamo București won 13–2 on aggregate.

16 September 1999
22:15

Benfica (Portugal)	0–1	(Romania) Dinamo București
	Report	Năstase 35'

Estádio da Luz, Lisbon
Attendance: 31,000
Referee: Sándor Puhl (Hungary)
30 September 1999
19:45

Dinamo București (Romania)	0–2	(Portugal) Benfica
	Report	Maniche 25'; Chano 72'

Stadionul Național, Bucharest
Attendance: 11,144
Referee: Alan Snoddy (Northern Ireland)

Benfica won 2–1 on aggregate.
