= 2000 Cupa României final =

- Event: 1999–2000 Cupa României
Dinamo București	Universitatea Craiova
Divizia A	Divizia A
2	0
- Date: 13 May 2000
- Venue: Stadionul Naţional, Bucharest
- Referee: Sorin Corpodean (Romania)
- Attendance: 55,000

The 2000 Cupa României final was the 62nd final of Romania's most prestigious cup competition. The final was played at the Stadionul Naţional in Bucharest on 13 May 2000 and was contested between Divizia A sides Dinamo București and Universitatea Craiova. The cup was won by Dinamo.

== Route to the final ==
FC Dinamo București

Round of 32	Tractorul Brașov	1–4	Dinamo București
Round of 16	Dinamo București	3–1	Rocar București
Quarter-finals	Dinamo București	3–2	Naţional București
Semi-finals 1st Leg	Oţelul Galaţi	0–2	Dinamo București
Semi-finals 2nd Leg	Dinamo București	3–1	Oţelul Galaţi

FC Universitatea Craiova

Round of 32	Telecom Arad	1–3	Universitatea Craiova
Round of 16	Universitatea Craiova	1–0	Steaua București
Quarter-finals	Universitatea Craiova	1–0	Petrolul Ploieşti
Semi-finals 1st Leg	Universitatea Craiova	2–0	Rapid București
Semi-finals 2nd Leg	Rapid București	2–1	Universitatea Craiova

== Match details ==
13 May 2000
20:30 EEST

Dinamo București	2–0	Universitatea Craiova
Niculae 6' (pen.); Hîldan 89'	Report

Stadionul Naţional, Bucharest
Attendance: 55,000
Referee: Sorin Corpodean (Romania)

Dinamo București	Universitatea Craiova

DINAMO BUCUREŞTI:
GK	1	(Romania) Ştefan Preda
DF	17	(Romania) Giani Kiriţă
DF	4	(Romania) Valentin Năstase
DF	6	(Romania) Gheorghe Mihali
DF	20	(Romania) Daniel Florea
MF	8	(Romania) Florentin Petre	(substituted off) 90'
MF	11	(Romania) Cătălin Hîldan
MF	10	(Romania) Ioan Lupescu (c)
MF	5	(Romania) Daniel Iftodi
FW	13	(Romania) Adrian Mihalcea	(substituted off) 69'
FW	16	(Romania) Marius Niculae	(substituted off) 89'
Substitutes:
GK	12	(Morocco) Khalid Fouhami
LB	21	(Romania) Cornel Buta	(substituted on) 90'
MF	14	(Romania) Florin Cernat
MF	23	(Romania) Bogdan Mara	(substituted on) 69'
FW	19	(Romania) Claudiu Drăgan	(substituted on) 89'
Manager:
(Romania) Cornel Dinu

UNIVERSITATEA CRAIOVA:
GK	1	(Romania) Florin Prunea
DF	2	(Romania) Flavius Stoican
DF	24	(Romania) Cosmin Bărcăuan
DF	4	(Romania) Florin Bătrânu
DF	6	(Romania) Corneliu Papură (c)	(substituted off) 68'
MF	19	(Romania) Ionuț Dragomir	(substituted off) 57'
MF	18	(Romania) Marius Sava
MF	7	(Romania) Silvian Cristescu
MF	11	(Romania) Cornel Frăsineanu
FW	16	(Romania) Alin Vigariu	(substituted off) 82'
FW	11	(Romania) Claudiu Niculescu
Substitutes:
MF	10	(Romania) Ştefan Grigorie	(substituted on) 57'
MF	14	(Romania) Robert Vancea	(substituted on) 68'
FW	9	(Romania) Eugen Neagoe	(substituted on) 82'
Manager:
(Romania) Emil Săndoi

MATCH OFFICIALS

- Assistant referees:
  - (Romania) Nicolae Grigorescu
  - (Romania) Ioan Onicaş
- Fourth official:

MAN OF THE MATCH

MATCH RULES

- 90 minutes.
- 30 minutes extra-time (15-minute intervals)
- Penalty shoot-out if scores level after extra time.
- Seven named substitutes
- Maximum of 3 substitutions.
