= Marius Sava =

Romanian footballer

Personal information
- Date of birth: 30 November 1978 (age 47)
- Place of birth: Craiova, Romania
- Height: 1.71 m (5 ft 7 in)
- Positions: Midfielder; forward

Youth career
- Universitatea Craiova

Senior career*
Years	Team	Apps	(Gls)
1995–2003	Universitatea Craiova	107	(18)
2001	→ Genoa (loan)	3	(0)
2003–2004	Național București	16	(0)
2004–2005	Argeș Pitești	24	(4)
2006	Pandurii Târgu Jiu	8	(0)
2007–2008	Nyíregyháza Spartacus	5	(0)
2008–2009	Gaz Metan CFR Craiova		
Total		163	(22)

International career
1996	Romania U18	8	(2)
1998–1999	Romania U21	5	(0)
- * Club domestic league appearances and goals as of 13 March 2018

Marius Sava (born 30 November 1978) is a Romanian former professional footballer who played as a midfielder or forward. Seen as one of the most talented midfielders of his generation, Sava started his career at Universitatea Craiova and played for prominent Romanian clubs including Progresul București, Argeș Pitești, and Pandurii Târgu Jiu. Sava also had two short periods abroad, playing for Genoa in Italy and Nyíregyháza Spartacus in Hungary. He retired in 2009, aged only 31, after a season spent at Gaz Metan CFR Craiova; many consider that he never reached his true potential.

== Club career ==
Sava was born on 30 November 1978 in Craiova, Romania. He began playing football at Universitatea Craiova, making his Divizia A debut on 23 September 1995 under coach Sorin Cârțu in a 1–0 victory against Sportul Studențesc București. He scored a career-best seven goals in the 1999–2000 season. The team reached the 2000 Cupa României final, where Sava played the entire match under coach Emil Săndoi in the 2–0 loss to Dinamo București. Subsequently, he played in a 1–1 draw against Pobeda in the 2000–01 UEFA Cup qualifying round.

In January 2002, Genoa acquired Sava on loan from "U" Craiova for €200,000, securing an option to purchase him permanently after six months for an additional €1.4 million. There, he became teammates with his compatriots Paul Codrea, Adrian Mihalcea and Valentin Năstase. Sava made his Serie B debut on 17 February 2002, when coach Edoardo Reja sent him in the 64th minute to replace Alessandro Manetti in a 0–0 draw against Messina. His spell at Genoa was unsuccessful, as he played only three league matches and struggled to adapt to Italian football's reliance on physical strength.

Following his spell at Genoa, Sava returned to Universitatea Craiova. In 2003, he moved to Național București. One year later, he signed with Argeș Pitești, playing there for eighteen months. Afterwards, Sava joined Pandurii Târgu Jiu where he made his last Divizia A appearance on 20 May 2006 in a 3–2 loss to Național București, totaling 155 matches with 22 goals in the competition.

In 2007, Sava signed for Nyíregyháza Spartacus, making his Nemzeti Bajnokság I debut on 28 July under coach Révész Attila, playing alongside compatriots Filip Lăzăreanu, Claudiu Cornaci and Tibor Moldovan in a 1–0 win over Tatabánya. He made five appearances in the Hungarian league. He ended his career after helping Gaz Metan CFR Craiova earn promotion from the third league to the second at the end of the 2008–09 season.

== International career ==
From 1996 to 1999, Sava was consistently featured for Romania's under-18 and under-21 sides.

== Honours ==
Universitatea Craiova

- Cupa României runner-up: 1999–00

Gaz Metan CFR Craiova

- Liga III: 2008–09
