= Valentin Năstase =

Romanian footballer and manager

Personal information
- Full name: Vasile Valentin Năstase
- Date of birth: 4 October 1974 (age 52)
- Place of birth: Călinești, Romania
- Height: 1.83 m (6 ft 0 in)
- Position: Centre-back

Team information
- Current team: SCM Râmnicu Vâlcea (assistant)

Youth career
- Dacia Pitești
- –1993: CSȘ Aripi Pitești

Senior career*
Years	Team	Apps	(Gls)
1993–1994	Gloria Bistrița	11	(0)
1994–1999	Argeș Pitești	130	(2)
1999–2002	Dinamo București	64	(2)
2002	Genoa	15	(0)
2002–2004	Palermo	38	(2)
2004–2006	Bologna	34	(0)
2006–2007	Ascoli	29	(0)
2007	Dinamo București	2	(0)
2008–2009	Eintracht Braunschweig	25	(7)
2009–2012	Gloria Bistrița	65	(4)
2014–2015	Argeș 1953 Pitești		
Total		413	(17)

International career
1999–2005	Romania	4	(0)

Managerial career
- 2015: Argeș 1953 Pitești
- 2018–2019: Argeș Pitești (assistant)
- 2020–2022: Chindia Târgoviște (assistant)
- 2022–2023: Romania U21 (assistant)
- 2023–2024: Gloria Buzău (assistant)
- 2024–2025: Politehnica Iași (assistant)
- 2025–: SCM Râmnicu Vâlcea (assistant)
- * Club domestic league appearances and goals

Vasile Valentin Năstase (born 4 October 1974) is a Romanian former professional footballer who played as a defender. He works as assistant coach at Liga III club SCM Râmnicu Vâlcea.

== Club career ==
=== Gloria Bistrița and Argeș Pitești ===
Năstase was born on 4 October 1974 in Călinești, Romania and began playing football at Dacia Pitești at the age of 12. Three years later, he moved to CSȘ Aripi Pitești under coach Gabi Trandafirescu. He began his senior career at Gloria Bistrița, which paid 6 million lei for his transfer. Năstase made his Divizia A debut on 6 November 1993 under coach Constantin Cârstea in a 4–0 victory against Politehnica Timișoara. The team won the Cupa României at the end of the season, but Cârstea did not use him in the 1–0 win over Universitatea Craiova in the final.

In 1994, Năstase was transferred from Gloria to Argeș Pitești for a fee of 10 million lei. He helped the team earn a third place in the 1997–98 season. During the 1998–99 UEFA Cup, Năstase played five games, helping Argeș advance past Dinamo Baku and İstanbulspor through the qualifying rounds, before the team was defeated by Celta Vigo in the first round.

=== Dinamo București ===
In 1999, Năstase went to play for Dinamo București, which paid a total transfer fee of €540,000 to Argeș. He helped the club eliminate Mondercange in the qualifying round of the 1999–2000 UEFA Cup, but his side was defeated in the following round 2–1 on aggregate by Benfica, with him scoring a goal in the 1–0 away victory in the first leg. He finished his first season with the club by winning The Double, playing 27 league games under coach Cornel Dinu and the entire match in the 2–0 win over Universitatea Craiova in the Cupa României final. Subsequently, he played the full 90 minutes under Dinu in the 2001 Cupa României final, as Dinamo defeated Rocar București 4–2. In the first half of the 2001–02 season, Năstase made 13 league appearances and scored two goals under coach Marin Ion. However, he was transferred in the middle of the season to Genoa, but Dinamo still managed to win the championship without him.

=== Career in Italy ===
In February 2002, Serie B side Genoa transferred him and Adrian Mihalcea from Dinamo, paying €600,000 for Năstase. There, they became teammates with their compatriots Paul Codrea and Marius Sava. In 2002, Năstase was signed by Palermo, which was then run by the former owner of Venezia, Maurizio Zamparini. The transfer was a player swap, as Genoa sent him and Massimo Mutarelli to Palermo in exchange for Pierluigi Brivio, Mauro Bressan and Mario Cvitanović. Năstase reunited at The Eagles with Codrea, and in the 2003–04 season he helped the team win the Serie B title, thus gaining promotion to Serie A.

In 2004, Palermo exchanged Năstase to Bologna for Cristian Zaccardo. He made his Serie A debut on 19 September 2004 under coach Carlo Mazzone in a 2–0 loss to AC Milan. Bologna suffered relegation at the end of the season, but Năstase stayed with the club for one more season in Serie B. Subsequently, he returned to Serie A football in 2006, joining Ascoli. He played regularly during the 2006–07 season, but could not avoid the team's relegation to Serie B. Năstase played a total of 45 matches in Serie A and 71 games with two goals in Serie B.

=== Late career ===
Năstase returned to Romania in 2007 to make a comeback with Dinamo București. The club had the objective of reaching the Champions League group stage, with Năstase appearing in both legs of the third qualifying round against Lazio Roma, which was eventually lost with 4–2 on aggregate. In the second leg, while his side was leading 1–0, Năstase fouled Simone Del Nero, and a penalty was awarded to Lazio from which Tommaso Rocchi scored, initiating a comeback that resulted in a 3–1 victory. He left the club shortly afterwards, having been made the scapegoat for the defeat to Lazio.

In January 2008, Năstase joined the German Regionalliga Nord club Eintracht Braunschweig for a two-season spell. Subsequently, he went back to Romania to join Gloria Bistrița, 17 years after his first stint with the club. The team suffered relegation at the end of the season, but he stayed with the club, helping it achieve promotion back to the first league after one year. Năstase made his last Liga I appearance on 28 October 2012 in a 4–0 loss to Steaua București, totaling 248 matches with five goals in the competition. He ended his career in 2015 at Liga IV side Argeș 1953 Pitești.

== International career ==
Năstase won four caps for Romania. He made his debut on 28 April 1999 under coach Victor Pițurcă in a 1–0 friendly win over Belgium. His last appearance took place on 9 February 2005 in a friendly that ended in a 2–2 draw against Slovakia.

== Managerial career ==
In July 2015, Năstase was named head coach of Argeș 1953 Pitești in Liga IV, but was dismissed in November and replaced with Adrian Dulcea. From 2018 to 2019, he was the assistant coach to Emil Săndoi and then Nicolae Dică at Argeș Pitești. Subsequently, in the following years he worked as Săndoi's assistant at Chindia Târgoviște and Romania's under-21 team. In 2023, he became the assistant of Andrei Prepeliță at Gloria Buzău, moving one year later to work once again with Săndoi at Politehnica Iași. In 2025, Năstase was appointed as the assistant of Constantin Schumacher at SCM Râmnicu Vâlcea.

== Career statistics ==
Appearances and goals by national team and year
National team	Year	Apps	Goals
Romania	1999	1	0
Romania	2000	2	0
Romania	2001	0	0
Romania	2002	0	0
Romania	2003	0	0
Romania	2004	0	0
Romania	2005	1	0
Total		4	0

== Honours ==
=== Player ===
Gloria Bistrița

- Cupa României: 1993–94

Dinamo București

- Divizia A: 1999–2000, 2001–02
- Cupa României: 1999–2000, 2000–01

Palermo

- Serie B: 2003–04
