= Giani Kiriță =

Romanian footballer (born 1977)

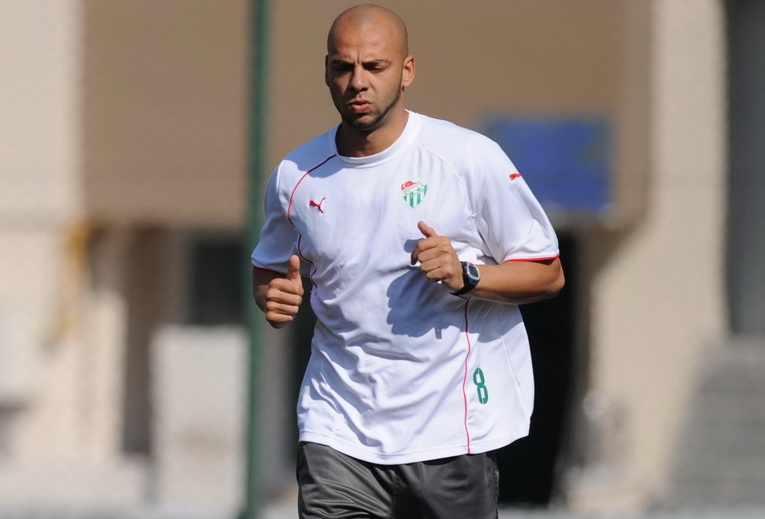
- Kiriță during a training session with Bursaspor

Personal information
- Full name: Giani Stelian Kiriță
- Date of birth: 3 March 1977 (age 49)
- Place of birth: Bucharest, Romania
- Height: 1.82 m (6 ft 0 in)
- Position: Defensive midfielder

Youth career
- Turistul Lebăda

Senior career*
Years	Team	Apps	(Gls)
1996–1997	Rocar București	14	(4)
1997	→ Dinamo București (loan)	4	(0)
1997–2003	Dinamo București	147	(9)
2003–2005	Samsunspor	52	(6)
2005–2007	Gaziantepspor	54	(4)
2007–2008	Ankaragücü	24	(5)
2008–2011	Bursaspor	32	(1)
2012	FCM Târgu Mureș	12	(0)
2012	CS Buftea	11	(2)
Total		350	(31)

International career
2000–2001	Romania	4	(0)

Managerial career
- 2012: CS Buftea
- * Club domestic league appearances and goals

Giani Stelian Kiriță (born 3 March 1977) is a Romanian former professional footballer who played as a defensive midfielder.

== Club career ==
=== Rocar and Dinamo ===
Kiriță was born on 3 March 1977 in Bucharest, Romania, growing up in the Pantelimon neighborhood, where he began playing football at around the age of 11 at the children's club, Turistul Lebăda. He started to play senior-level football at Divizia B club Rocar București. After half a season, Rocar loaned him to Dinamo București, where he made his Divizia A debut on 19 April 1997 under coach Cornel Țălnar in a 3–0 victory against Universitatea Cluj. In the following season he returned for another half a year in Divizia B at Rocar. Afterwards, Kiriță was transferred by Dinamo, where he would win The Double in the 1999–2000 season, coach Cornel Dinu giving him 32 league appearances in which he scored three goals, also using him the entire match in the 2–0 win over Universitatea Craiova in the Cupa României final. He won another Cupa României after Dinu used him the full 90 minutes in the 4–2 victory against his former side Rocar in the 2001 final. Kiriță won his second league title in the 2001–02 season, coaches Dinu and Marin Ion giving him 28 matches in which he scored two goals. His last trophy won with The Red Dogs was the 2002–03 Cupa României, being used by coach Ioan Andone all the minutes in the 1–0 over Național București in the final.

=== Career in Turkey ===
In 2003, Kiriță went to play in Turkey for Samsunspor, making his Süper Lig debut on 8 August 2003 under coach Erdoğan Arıca in a 3–1 home loss to Beşiktaş. He scored his first goal on 13 September 2003 in a 3–3 draw against İstanbulspor. In the following years he went on to play for Gaziantepspor, Ankaragücü and Bursaspor, totaling 162 matches with 15 goals in the Turkish league. With the latter he managed to win the 2009–10 title while working with coach Ertuğrul Sağlam. This marked the club's first title, won by a single point over Fenerbahçe, the second-place team, Kiriță appearing in eight games in which he scored one goal in a 1–0 victory against Gaziantepspor.

=== FCM Târgu Mureș and CS Buftea ===
In January 2012, he returned to play in Romania, signing with FCM Târgu Mureș, where he made his last Divizia A appearance on 21 May 2012 in a 2–1 loss to FC Brașov. Kiriță has a total of 163 matches with nine goals scored in Divizia A, and participated in 15 games in European competitions. He ended his career in December 2012 at Divizia B club CS Buftea, where for a while he was simultaneously the team's coach.

== International career ==
Kiriță played four games for Romania, making his debut under coach László Bölöni in a 1–1 friendly draw against Poland. His second game was also a friendly, a 2–2 draw against Slovenia. His last two appearances for the national team were during the 2002 World Cup qualifiers in a 2–0 away victory over rivals Hungary and a 1–1 draw against Georgia.

== Personal life ==
Kiriță's mother considered having an abortion when she was pregnant with him, because of the problems she had with his father, which included domestic violence. His father left the family when he was three years old, Kiriță seeing him rarely afterwards, being raised by his mother with the help of his grandmother and older sister. He married Daniela Milu in 2000, but they divorced in 2007, having a daughter and a son together. After he ended his football career, Kiriță appeared in several TV shows in Romania, and for a while he had his own TV show called Giani Kiriță, antrenat la Școala Vieții (Giani Kiriță, coached at the School of Hard Knocks) which aired on Antena Stars. He had an amateur mixed martial arts fight that he won by knockout against Andi Constantin. Kiriță is a fan of hip hop music, particularly American rapper DMX, evidenced by his ownership of an exact replica of DMX's chain and the temporary display of "DMX" on one of his car's license plates. He also admires the Pantelimon-based group B.U.G. Mafia and maintains personal relationships with its members.

== Honours ==
Dinamo București

- Divizia A: 1999–2000, 2001–02
- Cupa României: 1999–2000, 2000–01, 2002–03

Bursaspor

- Süper Lig: 2009–10

== See also ==
- List of FC Dinamo București players
- List of foreign Süper Lig players
