= Tinel Petre =

Romanian footballer

Personal information
- Full name: Tánase Tinel Petre
- Date of birth: 14 March 1974 (age 52)
- Place of birth: Bolintin-Vale, Romania
- Height: 1.81 m (5 ft 11 in)
- Position: Defender

Youth career
- National București
- Viitorul București

Senior career*
Years	Team	Apps	(Gls)
1992–1998	National București	127	(9)
1998–1999	Rocar București	25	(6)
1999	Dinamo București	18	(0)
2000	FC Brașov	10	(1)
2000–2001	Dinamo București	16	(1)
2001	FC Brașov	6	(1)
2002–2003	Argeș Pitești	23	(0)
2003–2005	Politehnica Iași	22	(1)
2005–2006	Astra Ploiești	10	(2)
Total		257	(21)
- * Club domestic league appearances and goals

Tinel Petre (born 14 March 1974) is a retired Romanian football defender.

== Honours ==
Dinamo București

- Liga I: 1999–00
- Cupa României: 1999–00, 2000–01

Politehnica Iași

- Liga II: 2003–04
