= Adrian Mihalcea =

Romanian footballer and manager

Personal information
- Full name: Adrian Dumitru Mihalcea
- Date of birth: 24 May 1976 (age 50)
- Place of birth: Slobozia, Romania
- Height: 1.80 m (5 ft 11 in)
- Position: Striker

Team information
- Current team: UTA Arad (head coach)

Youth career
- 1983–1984: Olimpia Slobozia
- 1984–1991: CSȘ Slobozia

Senior career*
Years	Team	Apps	(Gls)
1991–1992	Andrias Andrășești		
1992–1993	Abatorul Slobozia		
1993–1995	Unirea Slobozia		
1995–1996	Dunărea Călărași	34	(4)
1996–2001	Dinamo București	164	(67)
2002–2003	Genoa	40	(11)
2003–2004	Hellas Verona	20	(5)
2004–2005	Dinamo București	17	(1)
2005	Chunnam Dragons	3	(0)
2006	Vaslui	13	(1)
2006–2008	Aris Limassol	48	(27)
2008–2009	AEL Limassol	23	(5)
2009–2010	Aris Limassol	28	(8)
2010	Astra Ploiești	8	(1)
2011	Unirea Urziceni	15	(3)
2011–2012	Concordia Chiajna	18	(1)
2012–2013	Unirea Slobozia	17	(5)
2021–2024	Abatorul Slobozia		
Total		448	(139)

International career
1995–1997	Romania U21	10	(3)
1998–2003	Romania	16	(0)

Managerial career
- 2013–2015: Unirea Slobozia
- 2015: ACS Berceni
- 2016–2017: Dunărea Călărași
- 2017: UTA Arad
- 2017: Mioveni
- 2017–2019: Romania (assistant)
- 2020: Dinamo București
- 2020–2022: Unirea Slobozia
- 2022: Chindia Târgoviște
- 2022–2023: Gloria Buzău
- 2023–2025: Unirea Slobozia
- 2025–: UTA Arad
- * Club domestic league appearances and goals

Adrian Dumitru Mihalcea (born 24 May 1976) is a Romanian professional football manager and former player, currently in charge of Liga I club UTA Arad.

== Club career ==
=== Early career ===
Mihalcea was born on 24 May 1976 in Slobozia, Romania and began playing football as a child at local club Olimpia. Afterwards, he joined the junior squads of CSȘ Slobozia where he worked with coaches Constantin Prepeliță and Mihai Basarab. At the age of 15, he went to play senior-level football at Andrias Andrășești in the county league for one year. Mihalcea then came back to Slobozia, where for several years he played for Abatorul and Unirea in Divizia C. In the 1995–96 season, he played for Divizia B club Dunărea Călărași.

=== Dinamo București ===
In 1996, Mihalcea joined Dinamo București, making his Divizia A debut on 31 July, when coach Marian Bondrea sent him in the 72nd minute to replace Marian Ivan in a 3–0 victory against Gloria Bistrița. He scored his first goal in the competition on 18 August in a 2–1 win over Sportul Studențesc București. Mihalcea made his debut in European competitions by playing in both legs and scoring a goal in the 4–1 aggregate loss to Knattspyrnufélag Reykjavíkur in the first qualifying round of the 1997–98 UEFA Cup. During the 1998–99 season, he was the team's top scorer, netting a career-best 18 goals. In the first half of the 1999–2000 season, Mihalcea was part of an offensive trio alongside Marius Niculae and Adrian Mutu, while also having Ion Vlădoiu as a competitor. He scored 13 goals in the 29 league matches played under coach Cornel Dinu, helping Dinamo win The Double. One of these goals was the winning goal in a 3–2 derby win against Steaua București that mathematically secured the title. He also played as a starter before being replaced in the 69th minute by Bogdan Mara in the 2–0 victory against Universitatea Craiova in the 2000 Cupa României final. In addition to his goal that secured the 1999–2000 title, he scored three other league goals in the derby against Steaua, contributing to one victory and two losses for his side. Mihalcea helped Dinamo win the 2000–01 Cupa României, scoring a brace in the 4–2 victory against Rocar București in the final before Dinu substituted him with Claudiu Drăgan in the 82nd minute. Over his years at Dinamo, Mihalcea played 11 matches with six goals in European competitions. Notably, during the 2001–02 UEFA Cup, he scored one goal that helped the team get past Dinamo Tirana in the qualifying round, but they were defeated by Grasshopper in the first round against whom he netted twice. In the first half of the 2001–02 season, Mihalcea captained the team and scored 11 goals in the 14 league matches played under coach Marin Ion. However, he was transferred in the middle of the season to Genoa, but Dinamo still managed to win the championship without him. For the way he played in 2001, Mihalcea was placed fifth in the ranking for the Romanian Footballer of the Year award, the same position as Rapid București's Daniel Pancu.

=== Genoa and Hellas Verona ===
In February 2002, Serie B side Genoa transferred him and Valentin Năstase from Dinamo, paying a fee estimated by the press between €900,000 and €1.3 million for Mihalcea. There, Mihalcea became teammates with compatriots Paul Codrea, Claudiu Niculescu and Marius Sava. He made his Serie B debut on 10 February 2002 under coach Edoardo Reja in a 1–1 draw against Siena. He scored his first goal in the competition on 3 March in a 2–1 loss to AC Ancona. Mihalcea had a rough period during his first six months in Italy, as he had to adapt to the Italian tactical approach, physical strength and training sessions which were different from what he was accustomed to in Romania. Afterwards, he scored nine goals for Genoa during the 2002–03 season. He was transferred from Genoa to fellow Serie B club Hellas Verona for the 2003–04 season.

=== Return to Dinamo ===
In September 2004, Mihalcea returned to Dinamo. On 21 November 2004, he was in the center of a controversy when, during an away game against Universitatea Craiova, a fan entered the field, threw a "U" Craiova scarf into Claudiu Niculescu's face, and screamed:"You are a stinking traitor!". Shortly after, Mihalcea tackled the fan to the ground. The fan sued Mihalcea and eventually they settled out of court. Mihalcea scored a single goal during the 2004–05 season in a 1–0 win over Sportul Studențesc București. However, he helped Dinamo win the 2004–05 Cupa României by playing as a starter under coach Ioan Andone before being substituted by Ionuț Bălan in the 70th minute of the 1–0 victory against Farul Constanța in the final.

=== Chunnam Dragons and Vaslui ===
Mihalcea was sold by Dinamo in the summer of 2005 to South-Korean club Chunnam Dragons for a €600,000 fee. There, he was teammates with fellow Romanian Adrian Neaga. However, his spell at Chunnam was unsuccessful, as he made only three K League 1 appearances, claiming he had problems adapting to South Korean football's reliance on physical strength.

In early March 2006, Mihalcea signed a three-month contract with Vaslui. He scored a single goal during this time, when he closed the scoring from a penalty in a 3–0 victory against Argeș Pitești.

=== Aris Limassol and AEL Limassol ===
In the summer of 2006, Mihalcea moved to Cypriot First Division side Aris Limassol. There, he became teammates with Romanians Costel Mozacu and Laurențiu Diniță, and was coached by Mihai Stoichiță. In his first season, he scored 15 league goals. In the next season, he netted 12 times, but the team suffered relegation. Subsequently, for the 2008–09 season, Mihalcea went to play for AEL Limassol where he worked once again with Stoichiță. Mihalcea helped AEL reach the 2009 Cypriot Cup final, where he entered the field in the 83rd minute to replace Rui Júnior in the 2–0 loss to APOP Kinyras. Afterwards, he left AEL due to the club's financial problems and returned to Aris who gained promotion back to the first league. During his second spell with Aris, he scored eight league goals in the 2009–10 season and was a teammate of compatriot Daniel Bălan.

=== Late career ===
In the summer of 2010, Mihalcea signed with Liga I team Astra Ploiești. In February 2011, he moved to Unirea Urziceni but could not help the team avoid relegation at the end of the 2010–11 season. Mihalcea remained in the first league by joining Concordia Chiajna for the 2011–12 season, making his last Liga I appearance on 10 May 2012 in a 2–0 away win over Astra Giurgiu, totaling 235 matches with 74 goals in the competition.

Mihalcea ended his career at his hometown club Unirea Slobozia in Liga II. He helped the team maintain its place in the second division in the 2012–13 season, and in June 2013 he announced his retirement, citing his desire to start his coaching career. He came out of retirement in 2021, playing for several years for Liga IV team Abatorul Slobozia, while also working as the head coach of Unirea Slobozia.

== International career ==
Mihalcea was part of Romania's under-21 side that managed a first-ever qualification to a European Championship in 1998, which Romania subsequently hosted. In the final tournament that was composed of eight teams, coach Victor Pițurcă used him in the losses to the Netherlands and Germany, as they finished in last place.

Mihalcea played 16 matches for Romania, making his debut on 2 September 1998, when coach Pițurcă sent him in the 70th minute to replace Adrian Ilie in the 7–0 victory against Liechtenstein in the Euro 2000 qualifiers. He made three more appearances during those successful qualifiers, but he was not selected in the squad for the Euro 2000 final tournament. Mihalcea played in a 1–1 draw against Georgia in the 2002 World Cup qualifiers. Afterwards the team reached a play-off where they faced Slovenia and Mihalcea played in the 1–1 draw in the second leg, as his side failed to qualify to the final tournament. He made his last appearance for the national team on 30 April 2003 in a 1–0 friendly win over Lithuania.

== Managerial career ==
Mihalcea started his managerial career in July 2013, at his hometown club Unirea Slobozia, finishing the 2013–14 Liga II season in third place. His tenure at Unirea Slobozia ended in March 2015, and shortly afterwards he was employed by ACS Berceni. Subsequently, from January 2016 to June 2017, Mihalcea coached Dunărea Călărași and then he had two short spells at UTA Arad and Mioveni. He left Mioveni in September 2017 to be the assistant manager of Cosmin Contra at Romania's national team, a position he held until November 2017.

Mihalcea had his first coaching experience in the Romanian top-league Liga I when he was named head coach at Dinamo București in March 2020. His first match was a 3–1 loss to Sepsi Sfântu Gheorghe. After managing only a single victory and a draw across seven matches, he was dismissed and replaced by Gheorghe Mulțescu. In December 2020, Mihalcea returned to Unirea Slobozia in the second league, helping the team avoid relegation at the end of the 2020–21 season. In the following season, he managed a sixth-place finish with Unirea. On 7 June 2022, Mihalcea was appointed head coach at first-tier club Chindia Târgoviște on a one-year deal, with an option to extend for a further year. On 20 September, after three months in charge, he was sacked following a defeat to Universitatea Cluj. Afterwards, he took over Gloria Buzău in October 2022, leading the team to reach the promotion/relegation play-off for Liga I, but they were defeated 5–1 on aggregate by UTA Arad.

In June 2023, Mihalcea was appointed head coach for a third time at Unirea Slobozia, leading them to earn a first-ever promotion to Liga I in the 2023–24 season. Subsequently, in the 2024–25 season, he helped them avoid relegation after winning a promotion/relegation play-off against Voluntari. In June 2025, he took over Liga I club UTA Arad. By the end of the 2025–26 season, UTA won a game against his former club Unirea Slobozia, which mathematically relegated the latter club, and Mihalcea expressed his regret for Unirea's situation after the match.

== Playing statistics ==
Appearances and goals by national team and year
National team	Year	Apps	Goals
Romania	1998	4	0
Romania	1999	2	0
Romania	2000	4	0
Romania	2001	5	0
Romania	2002	0	0
Romania	2003	1	0
Total		16	0

== Managerial statistics ==
As of 6 November 2026

Team	From	To	Record							
Team	From	To	G	W	D	L	GF	GA	GD	Win %
(Romania) Unirea Slobozia	10 July 2013	3 March 2015	51	20	12	19	62	69	−7	39.22
(Romania) Berceni	4 March 2015	30 June 2015	11	4	3	4	14	16	−2	36.36
(Romania) Dunărea Călărași	29 January 2016	30 June 2017	54	27	12	15	89	58	+31	50.00
(Romania) UTA Arad	1 July 2017	4 September 2017	6	2	3	1	7	5	+2	33.33
(Romania) Mioveni	7 September 2017	24 September 2017	3	2	0	1	8	5	+3	66.67
(Romania) Dinamo București	11 March 2020	13 July 2020	7	1	1	5	5	11	−6	14.29
(Romania) Unirea Slobozia	9 December 2020	6 June 2022	46	17	16	13	61	38	+23	36.96
(Romania) Chindia Târgoviște	7 June 2022	20 September 2022	10	0	3	7	10	18	−8	0.00
(Romania) Gloria Buzău	5 October 2022	7 June 2023	26	7	12	7	28	30	−2	26.92
(Romania) Unirea Slobozia	1 July 2023	4 June 2025	73	30	16	27	81	82	−1	41.10
(Romania) UTA Arad	5 June 2025	present	60	24	17	19	80	75	+5	40.00
Total			347	134	95	118	444	407	+37	38.62

== Honours ==
=== Player ===
Dinamo București

- Divizia A: 1999–2000, 2001–02
- Cupa României: 1999–2000, 2000–01, 2004–05

AEL Limassol

- Cypriot Cup runner-up: 2008–09

Individual

- Romanian Footballer of the Year (fifth place): 2001

=== Manager ===
Unirea Slobozia

- Liga II: 2023–24
