= Alin Vigariu =

Romanian footballer

Personal information
- Full name: Alin Ștefan Vigariu
- Date of birth: 18 September 1980 (age 46)
- Place of birth: Craiova, Romania
- Height: 1.78 m (5 ft 10 in)
- Position: Midfielder

Team information
- Current team: IFK Mora

Senior career*
Years	Team	Apps	(Gls)
1999–2005	FC U Craiova	77	(2)
2000–2001	→ Electroputere Craiova (loan)	19	(2)
2001–2002	→ Rocar București (loan)	15	(2)
2005–2006	IK Brage	28	(6)
2007–2009	Gloria Buzău	20	(1)
2009–2012	Turnu Severin	59	(9)
2011–2013	Olt Slatina	20	(0)
2014	Arieșul Turda	?	(?)
2014–2015	Dalkurd FF	28	(2)
2016–	IFK Mora	?	(?)
Medal record
Universitatea Craiova
Runner-up	Romanian Cup	2000
- * Club domestic league appearances and goals as of 27 February 2018

Alin Ștefan Vigariu (born 18 September 1980) is a Romanian footballer who plays as a midfielder for IFK Mora.
