= Gabriel Popescu (footballer) =

Romanian footballer

Personal information
- Date of birth: 25 December 1973 (age 52)
- Place of birth: Craiova, Romania
- Height: 1.77 m (5 ft 10 in)
- Position: Midfielder

Youth career
- –1992: Electroputere Craiova

Senior career*
Years	Team	Apps	(Gls)
1992–1994	Electroputere Craiova	65	(0)
1995–1997	Universitatea Craiova	93	(15)
1998	Salamanca	15	(4)
1998–1999	Valencia	25	(1)
1999	→ Numancia (loan)	7	(1)
2000	Dinamo București	9	(0)
2000–2001	Național București	47	(5)
2001	→ Universitatea Craiova (loan)	8	(1)
2002–2004	Suwon Samsung Bluewings	59	(12)
2004	→ Național București (loan)	11	(1)
2005	JEF United Chiba	7	(1)
Total		346	(41)

International career
1993–1995	Romania U21	15	(1)
1996–2002	Romania B	5	(0)
1996–1998	Romania	15	(1)

Managerial career
- 2011: Sportul Studențesc
- * Club domestic league appearances and goals

Gabriel "Gabi" Popescu (born 25 December 1973) is a Romanian former professional footballer who played as a midfielder.

== Club career ==
=== Electroputere Craiova and Universitatea Craiova ===
Popescu was born on 25 December 1973 in Craiova, Romania. He began playing football at Electroputere Craiova, making his Divizia A debut on 12 September 1992 under coach Marian Bondrea in a 2–0 away loss to Rapid București. He also made his debut in European competitions, playing in a 4–0 loss to Panathinaikos in the first round of the 1992–93 UEFA Cup. In the middle of the 1994–95 season, Popescu joined neighboring club Universitatea. There, he scored a career-best seven goals during the 1996–97 season.

=== Career in Spain ===
Midway through the 1997–98 season, Popescu was transferred from "U" Craiova to Salamanca for a €1.2 million fee. He made his La Liga debut on 31 January 1998 under coach Txetxu Rojo in a 1–0 loss to Athletic Bilbao. Popescu scored his first goal on 22 February in a 3–1 victory against Mérida and then on 21 March he netted a hat-trick in a 5–4 win over Atlético Madrid. He was a colleague of fellow Romanian Bogdan Stelea, and during that time the team was nicknamed "Salamanca Rumana", because Ovidiu Stîngă, Lucian Marinescu and Cătălin Munteanu also played for the club around that period.

In the summer of 1998, Valencia acquired Popescu for a €4.2 million transfer fee. He was teammates there with compatriots Adrian Ilie, Dennis Șerban and Sabin Ilie. Popescu played 25 league matches during the 1998–99 season, scoring a single goal in a 2–2 draw against Celta Vigo. Furthermore, he played six matches in the successful Copa del Rey campaign, helping the team eliminate Levante, Barcelona and Real Madrid, but coach Claudio Ranieri did not use him in the 3–0 win over Atlético Madrid in the final. He also played in a 2–1 victory against Austria Salzburg to help his side win the 1998 Intertoto Cup. Thus, they qualified for the UEFA Cup where Popescu played four matches, as Valencia got past Steaua București in the first round before they were defeated on the away goals rule after 2–2 on aggregate by Liverpool in the second round.

For the first half of the 1999–2000 season, Popescu moved on loan from Valencia to Numancia, where he became teammates with Romanian Constantin Barbu. During this time, he played seven league matches and scored once in a 2–0 victory over Deportivo A Coruña. Popescu played a total of 47 matches with seven goals in La Liga.

=== Dinamo, Național and "U" Craiova ===
For the second half of the 1999–2000 season, Popescu returned to Romania, signing with Dinamo București. He made nine goalless league appearances under coach Cornel Dinu to help the team win The Double. However, he did not play in the 2–0 victory against Universitatea Craiova in the 2000 Cupa României final.

In the summer of 2000, Popescu signed with Național București, but midway through the 2000–01 season he went to play for Universitatea Craiova. After half a year, he returned to Național, helping the team earn a runner-up position in the 2001–02 season.

=== Asian spells and Național ===
In 2002, Popescu joined K League 1 club Suwon Samsung Bluewings, helping them win the 2002 Asian Super Cup and 2002 Korean FA Cup trophies. He played four matches in the early stages of the 2004 season, leaving afterwards to return to Național, but Suwon still managed to win the title without him. Popescu made his last Divizia A appearance on 27 November 2004 in Național's 1–0 loss to FCM Bacău, totaling 233 matches with 22 goals in the competition.

Popescu went to Japan and signed with JEF United Chiba in 2005. He made his J1 League debut on 6 July under coach Ivica Osim in a 2–0 loss to Cerezo Osaka. He scored his first goal in the competition on 22 October in a 4–0 victory against Vissel Kobe. Popescu also scored five goals during the 2005 J.League Cup campaign, helping his side win the trophy.

== International career ==
From 1993 to 2002, Popescu was consistently featured for Romania's under-21 and B sides.

Popescu played 15 matches and scored once for Romania, making his debut on 14 August 1996 when coach Anghel Iordănescu sent him in the 63rd minute to replace Ovidiu Stîngă in a 2–0 friendly win over Israel. Subsequently, he played four matches during the successful 1998 World Cup qualifiers. Popescu played three matches under Iordănescu in the final tournament, with the first two being victories against Colombia and England in the group stage. Those victories secured the mathematical qualification before the last group match against Tunisia. To celebrate, the team dyed their hair blonde and showed up on the pitch with their new look. The campaign ended as they were defeated 1–0 by Croatia in the round of 16 after Davor Šuker scored from a penalty that was awarded after Popescu fouled Aljoša Asanović.

== Managerial career ==
In 2011, Popescu briefly served as head coach at Liga I club Sportul Studențesc.

== Controversy ==
In April 2006, shortly after taking his new Ferrari 612 Scaglietti onto the Bucharest – Pitești motorway, Popescu experienced a sudden engine fire that destroyed the vehicle. He subsequently brought a lawsuit against the manufacturer, successfully securing €370,000 in damages.

== Career statistics ==
=== Club ===
Appearances and goals by club, season and competition
Club	Season	League			National Cup		League Cup		Continental		Total	
Club	Season	Division	Apps	Goals	Apps	Goals	Apps	Goals	Apps	Goals	Apps	Goals
Electroputere Craiova	1992–93	Divizia A	16	0			–		1 (Note: Appearances in the UEFA Cup)	0	17	0
Electroputere Craiova	1993–94	Divizia A	33	0			–		–		33	0
Electroputere Craiova	1994–95	Divizia A	16	0			–		–		16	0
Electroputere Craiova	Total		65	0			–		1	0	66	0
Universitatea Craiova	1994–95	Divizia A	15	1	5	1	–		–		20	2
Universitatea Craiova	1995–96	Divizia A	30	2			–		2	0	32	2
Universitatea Craiova	1996–97	Divizia A	29	7			–		3 (Note: Appearances in the UEFA Intertoto Cup)	1	32	8
Universitatea Craiova	1997–98	Divizia A	19	5	2	0	–		–		21	5
Universitatea Craiova	Total		93	15	7	1	–		5	1	105	17
Salamanca	1997–98	La Liga	15	5	0	0	–		–		15	5
Valencia	1998–99	La Liga	25	1	6	0	–		5 (Note: One appearance in the UEFA Intertoto Cup and four appearances in the UEFA Cup)	0	36	1
Numancia	1999–2000	La Liga	7	1	1	0	–		–		8	1
Dinamo București	1999–2000	Divizia A	9	0			–		–		9	0
Național București	2000–01	Divizia A	18	1	3	0	–		–		21	1
Național București	2001–02	Divizia A	29	4	1	0	–		–		30	4
Național București	Total		47	5	4	0					51	5
Suwon Samsung Bluewings	2002	K-League	24	6							24	6
Suwon Samsung Bluewings	2003	K-League	31	6							31	6
Suwon Samsung Bluewings	2004	K-League	4	0							4	0
Suwon Samsung Bluewings	Total		59	12							59	12
Național București	2004–05	Divizia A	11	1	2	0	–		–		13	1
JEF United Chiba	2005	J1 League	7	1	0	0	7	5	–		14	6
Career total			338	41	20	1	7	5	11	1	376	48

=== International ===
Appearances and goals by national team and year
National team	Year	Apps	Goals
Romania	1996	4	0
Romania	1997	4	1
Romania	1998	7	0
Total		15	1

Score and result list Romania's goal tally first, score column indicates score after Popescu goal.

International goal scored by Gabriel Popescu
No.	Date	Venue	Opponent	Score	Result	Competition
1	19 November 1997	Lluís Sitjar Stadium, Palma de Mallorca, Spain	Spain	1–1	1–1	Friendly

== Honours ==
Valencia

- Copa del Rey: 1998–99
- UEFA Intertoto Cup: 1998

Dinamo București

- Divizia A: 1999–2000
- Cupa României: 1999–2000

Suwon Samsung Bluewings

- K League 1: 2004
- Korean FA Cup: 2002
- Asian Super Cup: 2002

JEF United Chiba

- J.League Cup: 2005
