= Florin Cernat =

Romanian footballer (born 1980)

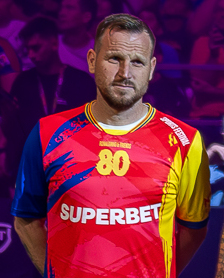
- Cernat in 2025

Personal information
- Full name: Florin Lucian Cernat
- Date of birth: 10 March 1980 (age 46)
- Place of birth: Galați, Romania
- Height: 1.71 m (5 ft 7 in)
- Position: Midfielder

Youth career
- 1986–1998: Oțelul Galați

Senior career*
Years	Team	Apps	(Gls)
1998–1999	Oțelul Galați	36	(5)
2000	Dinamo București	25	(2)
2001–2009	Dynamo Kyiv	138	(31)
2001–2004	→ Dynamo-2 Kyiv	14	(1)
2007–2008	→ Hajduk Split (loan)	28	(8)
2009–2010	Hajduk Split	25	(2)
2010–2013	Kardemir Karabükspor	68	(19)
2013–2014	Çaykur Rizespor	34	(11)
2014–2015	Oțelul Galați	26	(6)
2015–2016	Viitorul Constanța	17	(8)
2016–2018	Voluntari	59	(11)
Total		470	(104)

International career
1998	Romania U18	4	(0)
1999–2001	Romania U21	22	(4)
2000	Romania B	1	(0)
2000–2004	Romania	14	(2)

Managerial career
- 2018–2025: Voluntari (sporting director)
- 2025–2026: FCSB (sporting director)
- * Club domestic league appearances and goals

Florin Lucian Cernat (born 10 March 1980) is a former Romanian professional footballer who played as a midfielder.

== Club career ==
=== Oțelul Galați and Dinamo București ===
Cernat was born on 10 March 1980 in Galați, Romania and began playing junior-level football in 1986 at local club Oțelul. He made his debut for the senior team on 25 August 1998, when coach Vasile Simionaș sent him in the 84th minute to replace Emil Spirea in a 3–0 home loss to Vejle in the second qualifying round of the 1998–99 UEFA Cup. Four days later, he made his Divizia A debut by entering the field in the 81st minute to substitute Viorel Tănase in a 1–0 away victory against Universitatea Craiova. Cernat netted his first two goals for Oțelul on 1 May 1999 in a 3–2 away win over CSM Reșița. In the first half of the following season, he scored three goals in three wins against FC Onești, Ceahlăul Piatra Neamț and Petrolul Ploiești. During his spell with Oțelul, Cernat earned the nickname "Diamantul" (The Diamond).

Midway through the 1999–2000 season, Cernat was transferred from Oțelul to Dinamo București for a €700,000 transfer fee. Until the end of the season, he played 10 league matches under coach Cornel Dinu, helping Dinamo win The Double. Subsequently, he played in a 4–3 loss to Polonia Warsaw in the 2000–01 Champions League second qualifying round. Cernat scored his first goal for Dinamo on 13 September 2000 in a 2–0 away victory against Gaz Metan Mediaș. His second goal came eleven days later in a 1–1 draw against FCM Bacău. He left Dinamo in the middle of the 2000–01 season, but the team still managed to win the Cupa României without him.

=== Dynamo Kyiv and Hajduk Split ===
Cernat was transferred in early 2001 by Dynamo Kyiv, which paid a $1 million fee to Dinamo București. During his time with Dynamo, he was teammates with fellow Romanians Tiberiu Ghioane and Cristian Irimia. Cernat made his Vyshcha Liha debut on 11 March 2001, when coach Valeriy Lobanovskyi sent him in the 72nd minute to replace Georgi Peev in a 2–0 away win over Metalurh Mariupol. On 2 April, he scored his first goal in the competition in a 2–0 victory against Metalist Kharkiv. He finished the season with five goals scored in 13 matches, as the team won the championship. Afterwards, he played in a 4–2 away victory against Steaua București in the 2001–02 Champions League third qualifying round. Dynamo reached the group stage, where Cernat played in all six games. On 7 June 2002, he scored a hat-trick in a 6–0 win over Metalurh Mariupol.

Cernat helped Dynamo win the 2002 Commonwealth of Independent States Cup, scoring two goals in two victories against Regar-TadAZ Tursunzoda and Nisa Aşgabat in the campaign. Subsequently, he contributed to the team securing The Double in the 2002–03 season by playing under coach Oleksiy Mykhaylychenko in 24 league matches with six goals scored. During the same season, he helped the club advance past Pyunik and Levski Sofia —netting one goal against the first and two against the latter— in the Champions League qualifying rounds, reaching the group stage. In the 2003–04 season, coach Mykhaylychenko gave him 27 league appearances in which he scored four goals, including one in a 4–2 victory against rivals Shakhtar Donetsk and one in the 2–0 win over Volyn Lutsk which mathematically secured the title. Afterwards, Dynamo won the 2004 Ukrainian Super Cup by defeating Shakhtar on penalties, with Cernat starting the match under Mykhaylychenko, being substituted in the 52nd minute by Diogo Rincón. He then scored a brace in a 4–2 victory against Bayer Leverkusen in the 2004–05 Champions League group stage. The team also reached the 2005 Ukrainian Cup final, where he played as a starter before coach Yozhef Sabo substituted him in the 54th minute with Jerko Leko in the victory against Shakhtar. In the 2006–07 Champions League group stage, Cernat scored one goal in a 1–1 draw against Steaua. Domestically, he made 11 league appearances under coach Anatoliy Demyanenko, as Dynamo won the title.

For the 2007–08 season, Cernat was loaned to Hajduk Split by Dynamo in a player exchange for Tomislav Bušić. He made his debut in the Croatian league on 22 July 2007 under coach Ivan Pudar in a 0–0 draw against NK Zadar. In his following match, he netted his first two goals in the competition in a 7–1 win over Inter Zaprešić. Cernat scored eight goals over the course of the season, including another brace in a victory against Inter Zaprešić, this time by a score of 7–2. He also played four matches in the 2007–08 UEFA Cup qualifying rounds, as Hajduk got past Budućnost Podgorica in the first round before suffering defeat to Sampdoria in the following round.

Cernat returned to Dynamo for the 2008–09 season. He helped the club advance past Valencia and Paris Saint-Germain in the UEFA Cup campaign, reaching the semi-finals where they were defeated by Shakhtar. Furthermore, the team won the title, with Cernat playing three matches and scoring once under coach Yury Syomin. He made his last appearance in the Ukrainian top-league on 30 November 2008, scoring a goal in a 2–1 victory against Dnipro, totaling 129 matches with 28 goals in the competition. During his years at Dynamo, Cernat made 37 appearances with six goals scored in European competitions, of which 20 matches and three goals were in the Champions League group stage across six seasons.

In 2009, Cernat went for a second stint at Hajduk Split. He played in both legs of the 2–1 aggregate loss to Žilina in the 2009–10 Europa League third qualifying round. The team won the 2009–10 Croatian Cup, with Cernat being used by coach Stanko Poklepović in the first leg of the 4–1 aggregate victory against Šibenik in the final. On 13 May 2010, he made his last appearance in the Croatian league in a 5–2 away win over Croatia Sesvete in which he scored once, accumulating a total of 53 matches with 10 goals in the competition.

=== Kardemir Karabükspor and Çaykur Rizespor ===
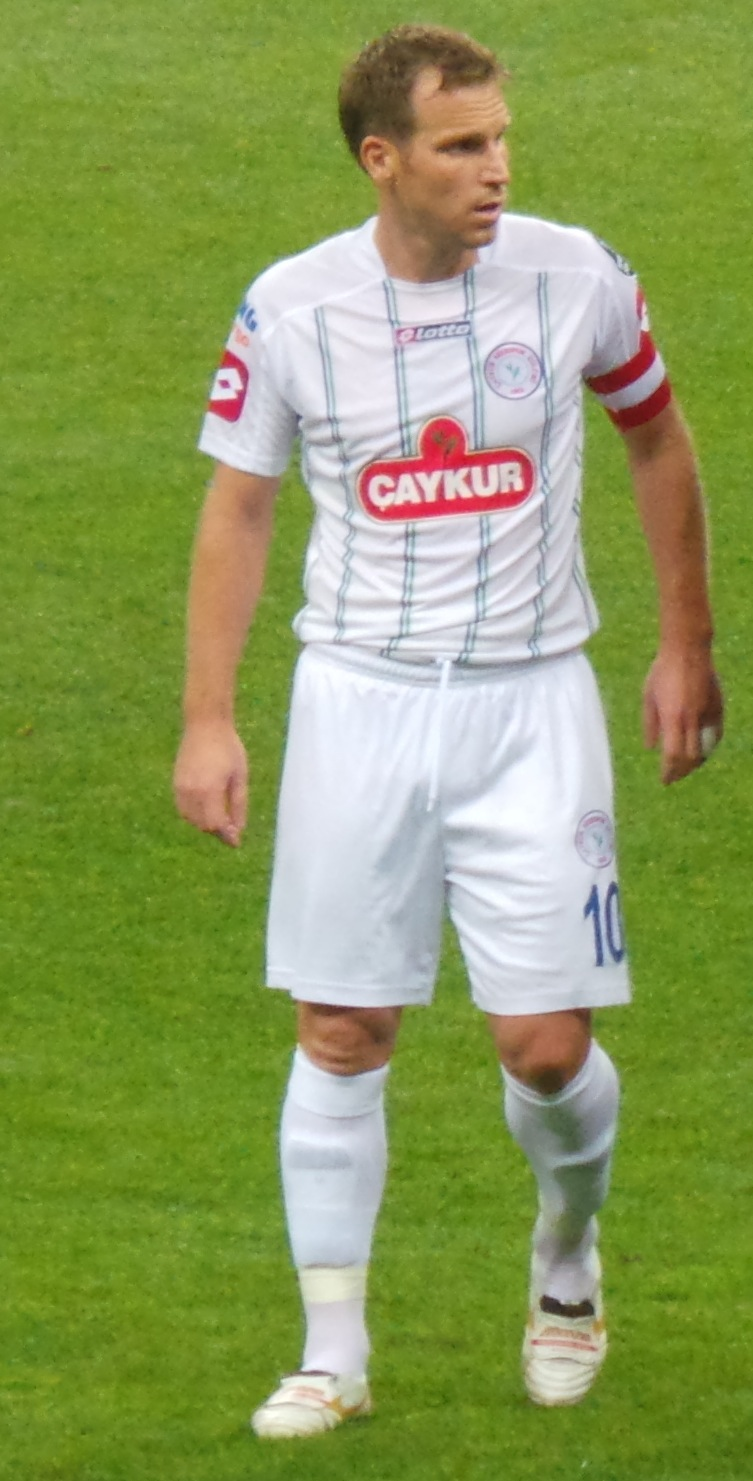
Cernat playing for Çaykur Rizespor in 2013

In the summer of 2010, Cernat joined newly-promoted Turkish Süper Lig club Kardemir Karabükspor. He made his league debut on 15 August 2010 under coach Yücel İldiz in a 2–1 home win over Manisaspor. He scored his first goal in the competition on 13 September in a 2–1 loss to Kasımpaşa. In October 2010, Cernat scored a goal and provided an assist in a 2–1 victory against Galatasaray, and scored a brace in a 2–2 draw against Bursaspor. On 12 February 2012, he opened the scoring in a 2–1 success over Fenerbahçe.

In January 2013, Cernat joined second-tier club Çaykur Rizespor, scoring a goal on his debut in a 4–1 win over Gaziantep. He netted nine goals until the end of the season, including a double in a 3–0 victory against Ankaragücü that secured the points needed for the team's mathematical promotion to the first league. Subsequently, Cernat made his last Süper Lig appearance on 22 March 2014 in a 0–0 draw against Eskişehirspor, bringing his total to 85 matches and 21 goals in the competition.

=== Oțelul, Viitorul and Voluntari ===
In September 2014, Cernat accepted the offer to return to Oțelul, signing a contract for one season, with an option to extend the deal for an extra season. He scored six goals during the 2014–15 season, including a hat-trick in a 4–1 victory against Ceahlăul Piatra Neamț, but could not avoid the team's relegation to Liga II.

In the summer of 2015, Cernat went to play for Viitorul Constanța, where he was coached by Gheorghe Hagi. He wore the captain's armband on his debut, managing to score a brace from two penalties in a 2–2 draw against CFR Cluj. During the 2015–16 season, he scored another two doubles in a 2–2 draw against Astra Giurgiu and a 2–1 win over ACS Poli Timișoara.

In June 2016, Cernat joined Voluntari. He scored his first two goals for his new team in a 4–1 victory against ACS Poli Timișoara. On 21 May 2017, he scored the only goal of a 1–0 win over FC Botoșani, which helped the team earn the points that mathematically saved them from relegation. Voluntari also won the 2016–17 Cupa României, but coach Claudiu Niculescu did not use him in the final. In the last round of the 2017–18 season, Cernat scored the final goal in the 2–2 draw against Juventus București in the closing minutes of the game, which gave the team the point that sent them to a relegation/promotion play-off, instead of a direct relegation. Voluntari won the play-off against Chindia Târgoviște without Cernat playing. Cernat has played a total of 163 matches, scoring 32 goals in Liga I.

== International career ==
From 1998 to 2001, Cernat was consistently featured for Romania's under-18, B and under-21 sides.

Cernat played 14 games and scored two goals for Romania, making his debut on 27 March 2002, when coach Anghel Iordănescu sent him on at halftime to replace Daniel Pancu in a 4–1 friendly victory against Ukraine. Subsequently, he played three matches in the Euro 2004 qualifiers. He scored his first goal for Romania in a 3–0 friendly victory against Georgia. Cernat played five games and scored one goal in a 5–1 win over Andorra during the 2006 World Cup qualifiers. In those qualifiers, he also made his last appearance for the national team on 17 November 2004 in a 1–1 away draw against Armenia.

== Career statistics ==
Appearances and goals by national team and year
National team	Year	Apps	Goals
Romania	2002	6	0
Romania	2003	1	0
Romania	2004	7	2
Total		14	2

Scores and results list Romania's goal tally first, score column indicates score after each Cernat goal.

List of international goals scored by Florin Cernat
No.	Date	Venue	Opponent	Score	Result	Competition	Ref.
1	18 February 2004	GSZ Stadium, Larnaca, Cyprus	Georgia	3–0	3–0	Cyprus International Tournament	
2	8 September 2004	Estadi Comunal d'Aixovall, Andorra la Vella, Andorra	Andorra	1–0	5–1	2006 FIFA World Cup qualification	

== Honours ==
Dinamo București

- Divizia A: 1999–2000
- Cupa României: 1999–2000, 2000–01

Dynamo Kyiv

- Ukrainian Premier League: 2000–01, 2002–03, 2003–04, 2006–07, 2008–09
- Ukrainian Cup: 2002–03, 2004–05, 2005–06, 2006–07
- Ukrainian Super Cup: 2004, 2006
- Independent States Cup: 2002

Hajduk Split

- Croatian Cup: 2009–10

Voluntari

- Cupa României: 2016–17
- Supercupa României: 2017

Individual

- Liga I Player of the Month: May 2015
