= Paul Codrea =

Romanian footballer and manager

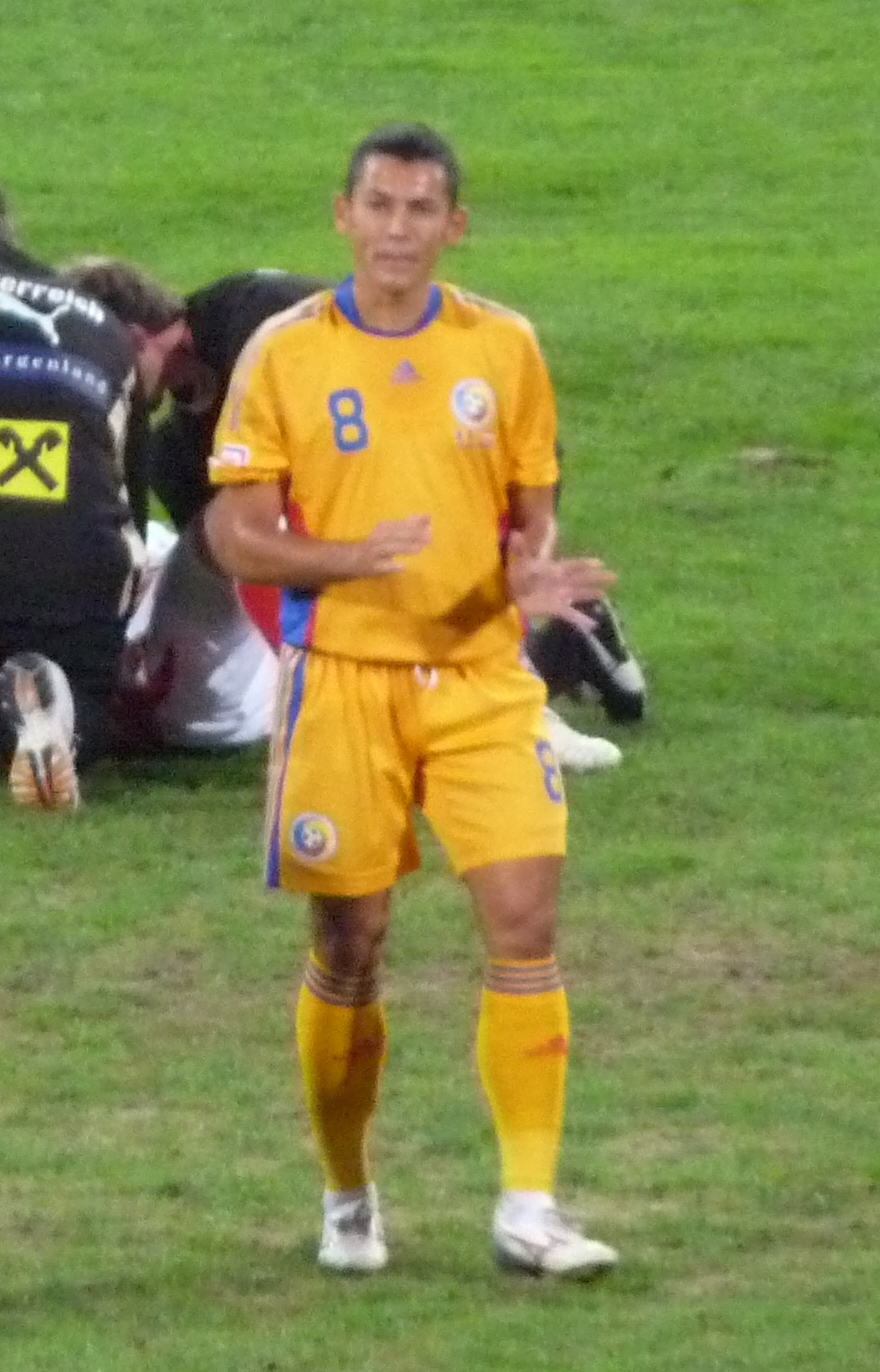
- Codrea in 2009

Personal information
- Full name: Paul Constantin Codrea
- Date of birth: 4 April 1981 (age 45)
- Place of birth: Timișoara, Romania
- Height: 1.74 m (5 ft 9 in)
- Position: Midfielder

Team information
- Current team: Dumbrăvița (youth)

Youth career
- –1996: LPS Banatul Timișoara
- 1996–1997: Dinamo București

Senior career*
| Years | Team | Apps | (Gls) |
| 1997–2000 | Dinamo București | 2 | (0) |
| 1997–1999 | → Politehnica Timișoara (Note: The statistics for the 1997–98 Divizia B season are unavailable.) (loan) | 30 | (2) |
| 1999–2000 | → Argeș Pitești (loan) | 34 | (1) |
| 2001–2003 | Genoa | 50 | (2) |
| 2003–2006 | Palermo | 32 | (2) |
| 2004 | → Perugia (loan) | 12 | (1) |
| 2004–2005 | → Torino (loan) | 35 | (1) |
| 2006–2012 | Siena | 109 | (2) |
| 2011 | → Bari (loan) | 6 | (0) |
| 2012 | Rapid București | 11 | (0) |
| 2013 | ASU Politehnica Timișoara | 2 | (0) |
| Total | | 323 | (11) |

International career
| 2000 | Romania U21 | 3 | (0) |
| 2000–2010 | Romania | 44 | (1) |

Managerial career
- 2013–2014: ASU Politehnica Timișoara
- 2015–2017: Ghiroda
- 2017–2018: Ripensia Timișoara
- 2019–2020: Ghiroda
- 2020–2023: ASU Politehnica Timișoara (youth)
- 2023: ASU Politehnica Timișoara (sporting director)
- 2023–2024: ASU Politehnica Timișoara
- 2025–: Dumbrăvița (youth)
- * Club domestic league appearances and goals

Paul Constantin Codrea (Romanian pronunciation: [ˈpa.ul ˈkodre̯a]; born 4 April 1981) is a Romanian football manager and former player, currently youth coach at Liga II club Dumbrăvița.

== Club career ==
=== Early career ===
Codrea was born on 4 April 1981 in Timișoara, Romania and began playing junior-level football in his hometown at LPS Banatul. He started his senior career at Dinamo București, making his Divizia A debut on 1 March 1997 when coach Cornel Țălnar sent him to replace Cătălin Hîldan in a 1–0 loss to Gloria Bistrița. After playing one more Divizia A game for Dinamo, the club loaned him to Politehnica Timișoara in Divizia B. Two seasons later, he returned to Divizia A football, being loaned by Dinamo to Argeș Pitești.

=== Career in Italy ===
In 2001, Codrea moved abroad, signing with Serie B club Genoa for a transfer fee of $2.75 million, where he was teammates with fellow Romanians Claudiu Niculescu, Adrian Mihalcea, Valentin Năstase and Marius Sava. He later joined Palermo for a transfer fee of approximately €2.5 million plus the forward Giuseppe Mascara. Codrea reunited at The Eagles with Năstase, and in the first half of the 2003–04 season he helped the team win the Serie B title, thus gaining promotion to Serie A. In January 2004, Codrea was loaned by Palermo, together with Franco Brienza, to Serie A team Perugia in exchange for the transfer of Fabio Grosso. He made his Serie A debut on 1 February 2004 under coach Serse Cosmi in Perugia's 2–2 draw against Parma. He netted his first goal in the competition on 29 February in a 4–2 home win over Bologna. Afterwards, Codrea was loaned once again by Palermo to Torino for the 2004–05 Serie B season in which he scored one goal in 35 appearances, helping them gain promotion to Serie A, which was later revoked because of the club's financial problems. He returned to Palermo, where he made six appearances in the 2005–06 UEFA Cup campaign as the club reached the round of 16 where they were eliminated by Schalke 04. Codrea definitively left Palermo when he signed with Siena in 2006, where he played in over 100 Serie A matches until 2012, and for a short while was teammates with compatriot Cosmin Moți. In 2011 he was loaned to Bari for half a year. His last Serie A appearance took place on 7 January 2012 in Siena's 4–0 home win over Lazio, totaling 133 games with three goals in the competition and 111 matches with six goals in Serie B.

=== Late career ===
In July 2012, Codrea returned to Romania and joined Rapid București, where on 2 December he played his last game in the Romanian first league in a 1–0 away loss to FC Vaslui, accumulating a total of 47 appearances with one goal in the competition. In the winter of 2013, he returned home to Politehnica Timișoara, serving as a player-manager before retiring.

== International career ==
Codrea played 44 games and scored one goal for Romania, making his debut on 15 November 2000 under coach László Bölöni in a 2–1 friendly victory against FR Yugoslavia. His sole goal for the national team came on his fourth appearance, in a 3–0 friendly victory against Lithuania. Codrea played four games in the 2002 World Cup qualifiers, five in the Euro 2004 qualifiers and two during the 2006 World Cup qualifiers. Afterwards, he played eight games in the successful Euro 2008 qualifiers. He was used by coach Victor Pițurcă in all three games in the eventual group stage exit in the Euro 2008 final tournament. In the first game, which was a 0–0 draw against France, he came as a substitute and replaced Răzvan Cociș in the 64th minute. In the second he played the entire match in the 1–1 draw against Italy and in the third he was a starter, being replaced in the 72nd minute by Nicolae Dică in the 2–0 loss to Netherlands. Codrea played four games during the 2010 World Cup qualifiers and made his last appearance for the national team on 3 March 2010 in a 2–0 friendly loss to Israel.

On 25 March 2008, Codrea was decorated by the president of Romania, Traian Băsescu, for his performance in the Euro 2008 qualifiers, where Romania managed to qualify to the final tournament. He received Medalia "Meritul Sportiv" – ("The Sportive Merit" Medal) class III.

== Managerial career ==
Codrea signed with fifth league team ASU Politehnica Timișoara in 2013, replacing Antonio Foale who became General Manager. He debuted with a 3–0 victory over Gran-Plaz Liebling on 18 March 2013. He resigned on 29 November 2014.

== Career statistics ==
Appearances and goals by national team and year
| National team | Year | Apps | Goals |
|---|---|---|---|
| Romania | 2000 | 3 | 0 |
| Romania | 2001 | 6 | 1 |
| Romania | 2002 | 6 | 0 |
| Romania | 2003 | 3 | 0 |
| Romania | 2004 | 1 | 0 |
| Romania | 2005 | 1 | 0 |
| Romania | 2006 | 3 | 0 |
| Romania | 2007 | 9 | 0 |
| Romania | 2008 | 5 | 0 |
| Romania | 2009 | 6 | 0 |
| Romania | 2010 | 1 | 0 |
| Total | | 44 | 1 |

| # | Date | Venue | Opponent | Score | Result | Competition |
|---|---|---|---|---|---|---|
| 1 | 28 February 2001 | GSP Stadium, Nicosia, Cyprus | Lithuania | 0–3 | 0–3 | Friendly |

== Honours ==
=== Player ===
Palermo

- Serie B: 2003–04

=== Manager ===
Ghiroda

- Liga IV – Timiș County: 2016–17
