= Marius Niculae =

Romanian footballer

Personal information
- Full name: Marius Constantin Niculae
- Date of birth: 16 May 1981 (age 45)
- Place of birth: Bucharest, Romania
- Height: 1.84 m (6 ft 0 in)
- Position: Striker

Team information
- Current team: Romania U21 (sporting director)

Youth career
- 1990–1996: Dinamo București

Senior career*
Years	Team	Apps	(Gls)
1996–2001	Dinamo București	100	(44)
2001–2005	Sporting CP	59	(14)
2005–2006	Standard Liège	26	(4)
2006–2007	Mainz 05	6	(0)
2007–2008	Inverness Caledonian Thistle	35	(8)
2008–2012	Dinamo București	89	(38)
2011	→ Kavala (loan)	12	(4)
2012–2013	Vaslui	19	(11)
2013	Shandong Luneng	8	(2)
2013–2014	Hoverla Uzhhorod	13	(3)
2014	Şanlıurfaspor	0	(0)
2015	Dinamo București	13	(3)
Total		380	(131)

International career
1997	Romania U16	7	(4)
1997–1999	Romania U18	5	(6)
1999–2000	Romania U21	12	(4)
2000–2013	Romania	44	(15)

Managerial career
- 2021–: Romania U21 (sporting director)
- * Club domestic league appearances and goals

Marius Constantin Niculae (born 16 May 1981) is a Romanian former professional footballer who played as a striker, currently he is the sporting director of the Romania national under-21 team.

Niculae started his career with Dinamo București, progressing through their youth system to the first team squad. He made his first team debut in 1996 while he was still 15 years old and finished his time at the club having scored 44 goals in 100 Divizia A appearances. He joined Primeira Liga club Sporting CP in 2001 after signing for a reported transfer fee of $3 million. However, the actual transfer fee is believed to be around $4.5 million. His spell in Portugal is marked by many injuries netting only 14 goals in 59 league appearances, before leaving the club in 2005. He subsequently played for Standard Liège, Mainz 05 and Inverness, before returning to Dinamo in July 2008. He served as team captain for most of his four-year second spell at Dinamo until his departure to Vaslui in July 2012.

His honours include two league titles (one with Dinamo and one with Sporting), three Romanian Cups, one UEFA Cup runner-up, one Romanian Super Cup and one Portuguese Supercup. In 2001, Niculae won Divizia A Golden Boot netting 20 times. In the same year, Niculae came second in voting for the Romanian Footballer of the Year.

Described as a physical striker, with great ability in the air, Niculae made his international debut in 2000 at only 18 years old and has represented Romania at the Euro 2008. Niculae first captained his country in 2012, in the friendly match against Turkmenistan in the absence of regular captain Răzvan Raț. He managed 44 caps for Romania, scoring 15 goals.

== Early life ==
Niculae's father, Constantin, is a former judoka, who worked for Dinamo București as a fitness coach from 1996 until his departure in 2006. Niculae began judo at the age of five, and had attained a black belt while being trained by his father. He later stated: "The fact that I practiced this sport [judo] in the childhood, helped me to develop both mentally and physically. I think I avoided many injuries due to the fact that I learned how to fall without any danger for my health".

Niculae began his football career in 1990, playing for Dinamo under the guidance of Gheorghe Timar. Niculae spent six years at Dinamo's youth academy, before he was promoted by Cornel Dinu at the first team squad. During his first two years as a professional, he activated for both first team as well for the youth squad. During the 1997–98 season, while playing in the youth championship, goalkeeper Cristian Munteanu was sent-off, and since there were no substitutes left, Niculae replaced him without receiving any goal from Petrolul Ploiești.

== Club career ==
=== Dinamo ===
On 22 November 1996, Niculae became one of the youngest-ever players to debut in Divizia A, at 15 years and 190 days, after coming on as a substitute in Dinamo's 5–2 win at home against Farul Constanța.

He started the 1997–98 season, playing his first match in a European competition, appearing in a 0–2 historical defeat against Knattspyrnufélag Reykjavíkur on 23 July 1997. On 4 April 1998, he was in the starting line-up in a 0–5 away defeat in the Eternal derby against Steaua. One week later, Niculae managed to score his first league goals, netting a brace in a 7–1 home win against Jiul Petroșani. On 19 April, he scored another brace against FC Național in a 4–2 home win. He scored four goals in 12 appearances, in his second season as a professional. On 13 May, he scored another two goals against FC Național, in a 5–0 League Cup win, in the second round of the South Group.

"Marius is a force of nature; he knows how to use his strength and his body in front of the goal. Look how many goals he scored with his style of play; furthermore, he has a powerful shot."

— Cornel Țălnar, former Dinamo București manager

Following Cornel Dinu's appointment as team manager, the 17-year-old's career began to take off, as he was used more often. He later stated: "The most closest [manager] to me is Cornel Dinu. When he was Dinamo's manager, I made my first-team debut at 15 years and a half and I ended up winning two cups and one championship." He scored his first league goal of the 1998–99 season on 26 September, helping his team to demolish Universitatea Cluj 8–0. He did not find the net again until 21 November when he opened the scoreboard against Petrolul Ploiești in a 3–2 away win. His final goals of 1998 came on 9 December in a 2–0 cup win against UM Timișoara, netting a brace. He scored his first goal for Dinamo in 1999 on 2 April in a 5–0 home win against Olimpia Satu Mare. Niculae scored again against Universitatea Cluj on 21 April, establishing the final score in a 6–0 away win. He scored a late goal against Petrolul Ploiești on 26 May, which was his final goal of the season. He finished second in the league with Dinamo, netting seven times in 28 appearances. He also reached Romanian Cup semi-finals, scoring twice for his team.

The start of the 1999–00 season saw Niculae partnering Adrian Mutu and Adrian Mihalcea in the forward line, replacing Ion Vlădoiu who eventually left Dinamo since he became just a back-up player. On 12 August, he scored his first goal in a European competition in the 6–2 away win against Mondercange, netting Dinamo's sixth. Three days later, he scored the match-winning goal against Universitatea Craiova in a 2–1 league win. He scored again next round in a 4–1 home win over Petrolul Ploiești. On 26 August, Niculae netted his first hat-trick in the second leg against Mondercange, helping his team to win 7–0. Niculae managed to score in six consecutive games in all competitions, after he netted two more goals against Astra Ploiești and Rocar București, netting eight times overall. On 16 September, he played in a 1–0 away victory over Benfica in the UEFA Cup, coming in as a substitute for Daniel Iftodi. However, Dinamo failed to qualify further since they lost the second leg 0–2. Despite his excellent start, he did not manage to reproduce his form in the following months, netting only three goals until the end of 1999; once in a 3–1 cup win against Rocar București, and twice in the league against FCM Bacău and FCM Reșița. During the winter break, Niculae was close to a move to Serie A side US Lecce, but according to Pantaleo Corvino, the player had a change of heart during the Cyprus Four Nations Football Tournament, when he was called for the first time to the national team, so the transfer collapsed. During the Cyprus Tournament, Niculae suffered an injury that forced him out from the field for more than one month and a half. He made his come-back on 2 April, when he scored a brace in a 2–1 victory against FCM Bacău, opening his league account for 2000. He scored again three days later, in a 3–4 away defeat against FC Brașov. On 12 April, he scored in the second leg of the Romanian Cup semi-finals against Oțelul Galați, helping his team to win 3–1 and advance into the final. On 3 May, Niculae scored a brace against FC Argeș and he also wore the captain's armband for the first time for the closing stages of the match, after both Ioan Lupescu and Adrian Mihalcea were substituted off. Niculae won his first major trophy of his career as Dinamo bagged their first top-flight title in eight years, by a twelve-point margin, contributing with 13 goals in 27 appearances. Dinamo managed The Double on 13 May, as they won 2–0 against Universitatea Craiova in the Romanian Cup final, with Niculae opening the scoreboard from the penalty spot in the 31st minute. Since Niculae was not included in the squad for the Euro 2000 final tournament, he was selected for Romania U21, he was selected for Romania U21, which was allowed to participate in the League Cup. He scored a hat-trick against Rocar București and a brace against FC Național for Romania U21, before he was allowed to return to Dinamo for the final match of the South Group against Steaua București. Niculae scored his first goals in the Eternal derby against Steaua, netting twice as Dinamo gained an emphatic 7–0 win, highest margin of goals between the two teams.

With the departure of Ioan Lupescu during the summer of 2000, Niculae was handed the Number 10 jersey for Dinamo, switching his old squad number 16. He opened the 2000–01 season netting with a header in a UEFA Cup game against Polonia Warsaw in a 3–4 home defeat on 26 July. His league account started barely in the 5th round on 13 September, netting Dinamo's first in a 2–0 away win against Gaz Metan Mediaș. He failed to score again until 15 October, when he netted against Ceahlăul Piatra Neamț in a 3–3 away draw. He repeated the process two more rounds, when he scored twice against Rocar București in a 3–1 away win and once against FC Brașov in 2–0 away win. On 11 November, he scored with a header against Foresta Fălticeni giving his team a 4–0 lead in the 47th minute, only to receive five goals in the last 30 minutes of play, Dinamo losing the game 4–5. Despite the team's struggle in the championship, he was having an excellent run continuing to score against Universitatea Craiova and a brace against Astra Ploiești. On 30 November, he converted a controversial penalty against Rapid București, helping his team to qualify in the Romanian Cup semi-finals. He was selected by the fans as Dinamo Player of the Year, gaining 58% of the votes. In March 2001, Niculae continued where he left off the previous year, netting against FC Național and Rapid București from the penalty spot. He helped his team to reach the Romanian Cup final, netting in both legs of the semi-finals against Sportul Studențesc, Dinamo claiming a 5–3 win on aggregate. On 14 April, Niculae scored his first league hat-trick against Gaz Metan Mediaș in a 4–2 home win. In May, Niculae continued his quest for the Golden Boot, scoring three more goals against FCM Bacău, Petrolul Ploiești and Ceahlăul Piatra Neamț, taking his league tally of goals up to 17. On 19 May, he scored twice against Gloria Bistrița in a 3–1 home win. On 9 June, he scored in a 3–1 win against Universitatea Craiova, ending his tally of goals at 20, which was sufficient for him to win the Golden Boot. He ended up second in the league with Dinamo, managing to play in 27 games. On 16 June, he scored a brace against Rocar București in the Romanian Cup final, helping his team to claim the trophy after winning 4–2. Niculae dedicated his goals to former team captain Cătălin Hîldan, who died on the pitch in a friendly match against Șantierul Naval Oltenița on 5 October 2000. After the match, he stated: "We played this game thinking of Cătălin Hîldan, in his memory. I dedicate the goals I've scored to Cătălin and his family". Niculae was selected player of the season by Radio România Actualități, being rewarded with a Dacia SupeRNova, which he later gave to his father.

=== Sporting ===
On 7 July 2001, Niculae completed his move to Primeira Liga side Sporting Lisboa, signing a three-year contract with the option of a further two seasons for a reported fee of $3 million, though the actual transfer fee is believed to be around $4.5 million. He was handed the number 7 shirt, previously worn by Ivaylo Yordanov. He made his debut for Sporting in a friendly match against Académica Coimbra, coming in as a substitute in the 75th minute and netting five minutes later in a 5–2 victory. After he scored, he kissed the crest of the shirt, dedicating his goal to the team supporters.

On 12 August, Niculae made his official debut for Sporting netting the winning goal against archrivals Porto in a 1–0 home victory. Following his goal against Porto, shirt sales featuring Niculae's name and number skyrocketed, generating revenue of nearly $65,000 that day. He received the first red card of his career in the next round, in a 0–3 away defeat against Belenenses, also missing a penalty in the process. He returned on the field following his one-match ban on 8 September, winning a penalty that gave Sporting a 1–0 lead against Leiria, after Mário Jardel converted from the spot. Eight days later, he scored a brace and won a penalty in a 3–1 win against Gil Vicente. On 1 October, Niculae scored Sporting's second in a 5–0 victory over Vitória Guimarães. On 18 October, he scored his first European goal for The Lions netting the only goal in a 1–0 win against Halmstad in the UEFA Cup. On 27 October, Niculae scored another brace, giving his team an easy 6–0 win over Paços Ferreira, the first away win for Sporting with six goals scored since the 1984–85 season. Five days later, he scored again in the UEFA Cup in a 6–1 victory in the second leg against Halmstads. On 5 November, he netted again in a 5–1 win with Salgueiros. Following his excellent start for Sporting, the club set Marius Niculae a release clause of €17.5 million. On 6 December, he scored his third goal in the UEFA Cup, in a 1–1 home draw with Milan. On 17 December, he finished second on the vote for Gazeta Sporturilor's Romanian Footballer of the Year award, behind Cosmin Contra. On 22 December, in a game against Vitória de Setúbal, after a dangerous challenge, he suffered a career-threatening knee injury, ending his season prematurely. Despite László Bölöni's intention to give Niculae his comeback on the field faster than anticipated on Sporting's last game of the season against Beira-Mar, the doctors eventually denied the player's return. The Lions won The Double, Niculae contributing with seven goals in 16 games in the league, while in the cup he played only in a 3–1 win against Vilanovense.

After a long recovery, Niculae finally returned to regular first team action in the match against Leixões, scoring Sporting's second in a 5–1 win in the Portuguese supercup. He did not find the net again until November when he scored in a 2–0 home win over Marítimo and a 3–1 away win over Beira-Mar. He also scored his first goal for Sporting in the Portuguese Cup in a 4–1 away win against Estarreja. On 10 December 2002, he broke his toe in practice leading to a six-week absence. He returned to the field on 2 February 2003, in a 4–0 home win against Paços Ferreira, coming off the bench in the 73rd minute to assist Mario Jardel's third goal and Sporting's fourth. Three days later he netted his team's only goal in a 1–0 victory against Académica Coimbra. On 17 May, during a game against Nacional Madeira, Niculae fractured his fifth metatarsal bone in his right foot, leading to another long-term break off the field. He ended third in the league with his team, netting three goals in 17 appearances.

Having recovered from his injury, Niculae was expected to be among the substitutes against Rapid Wien, but a relapse of an older injury forced him out of the field for another four months. He was highly acclaimed on his comeback for Sporting on 21 January 2004, in a 4–0 home win in a friendly match against VfL Wolfsburg. He scored his first competitive goal after a 367-day hiatus on 7 February, during a 3–3 draw against Nacional Madeira. He also played with shirt number 9, switching his old squad number 7. He scored again on 10 April, in a 4–0 home victory against Estrela Amadora, coming off the bench in the 75th minute. On 9 May he opened the score-sheet in the last league match of the season against Vitória Guimarães, in a 2–0 away win. He ended for the second year in a row in third place in the league, netting three goals in 14 appearances, most of them as a substitute.

The start of the new season found Niculae continuing to struggle to find his spot in the first team squad. He played his first league match in a 0–2 away defeat against Vitória Setúbal on 12 September, coming off the bench in the 63rd minute. Two days later, he suffered another injury on his right foot while training. He came back on the field after a five-month break on 19 February 2005, in a goalless draw with Leiria, coming as a substitute for Ricardo Sá Pinto in the 81st minute. He made his first competitive start since his recovery nine days later, in an easy 4–0 home win against Estoril, scoring the first goal. On 14 April, he scored what proved to be his final goal for Sporting, equalising with a powerful header in a 4–1 home win against Newcastle United in the UEFA Cup quarter-finals. On 18 May, he came off the bench in the 73rd minute of the UEFA Cup final played on the home ground and lost by Sporting 1–3 over CSKA Moscow. He played his final match for The Lions four days later, appearing 90 full minutes in a 2–4 home defeat to Nacional Madeira.

On 14 June, he announced he would leave the club at the end of the month, since he did not reach an agreement over a contract extension; Sporting was offering a new contract with 70% less pay, while he was willing to accept a 30% pay reduction. He ended his four-year spell in Portugal, scoring 14 goals in 59 appearances in the league. During these years, he was also teammates with youngsters Ricardo Quaresma, Miguel Veloso and Cristiano Ronaldo, being roommates with the latter for a while in the team's training camps.

=== Standard Liège ===
On 31 August 2005, Niculae signed a one-year deal with Belgian First Division side Standard Liège, being given the number 9 shirt. He made his debut for Standard Liège in a 1–3 defeat to Beveren on 11 September. He scored his first goal for Standard in a 2–0 cup victory against Olympic Charleroi on 11 November. His first league goal came on 21 January 2006, in a 1–2 home defeat to Zulte Waregem. Nine minutes since his substitution in, he scored his second league goal in a 2–0 away win over Beveren on 11 February. Eleven days later, he scored again against La Louvière keeping his team in first place. On 17 March, he netted the winning goal in a 1–0 home win over Genk. He managed to reach the semi-finals in the Belgian Cup with Standard while in the league he finished second. In May 2006, he refused a contract extension, thus ending his spell in Belgium, scoring only five goals in 32 appearances in all competitions.

=== Mainz ===
After spending six months as a free agent, Niculae signed a six-month deal with German Bundesliga side Mainz 05 on 12 December 2006 where he was wanted by coach Jürgen Klopp. He made his official Mainz debut as a substitute in the 1–0 win against VfL Bochum on 27 January 2007. Four days later, he was in the start-up team in a 1–0 win over Borussia Dortmund, but he was substituted off after 58 minutes due to a poor performance. He failed to settle in the first team, leaving Bundesliga after just 162 minutes of league football without scoring a goal.

=== Inverness ===
After he passed his medical, Niculae joined Scottish Premier League's Inverness Caledonian Thistle, signing a two-year contract on 18 July 2007. His first application for a work permit was rejected, but Inverness appealed and asked fans to sign a petition to have the player's permit granted. After his appeal, he was granted a work permit and became eligible to play. On 11 August, Niculae became the first Romanian who played in the SPL, after he debuted for Inverness in a 1–2 away defeat against Motherwell. He scored his first goals on 28 August, netting a brace against Arbroath in a 3–1 win in the Scottish League Cup. He opened his league account on 8 December, netting twice against Hibernian in a 2–0 victory, ending a 14-match goalless streak in the SPL. He scored another brace in late December in a 3–1 home victory over Kilmarnock. He was awarded the Clydesdale Bank Player of the Month award for his four goals and two penalties obtained against Celtic and Heart of Midlothian in December, helping his team to pick up 15 points out of 18.

He continued his excellent form in January 2008, netting another brace and obtaining a penalty in a 3–0 victory against Gretna, giving Inverness its fifth home win in a row. On 27 February, Niculae scored again in a 1–2 away defeat against Celtic. Niculae's tenth goal of the season came against Kilmarnock, when Ross Tokely's pass found him shaping to curl a shot high into the net.

After the resignation of chairman Alan Savage, it became clear Inverness could not afford Niculae's wages, and the club accepted an offer of €500,000 from Dinamo București, in the summer of 2008. Niculae left Inverness with a record of ten goals in 38 games in all competitions. He later became involved in a dispute with the club over a share of the transfer fee that was not paid to him when he left. As a result, Inverness were ordered by FIFA to pay £133,000 to the player. However, the Court of Arbitration for Sport overturned the decision.

=== Return to Dinamo and loan to Kavala ===
==== 2008–2010 ====
On 24 July 2008, Niculae signed a four-year contract with his former club Dinamo București. Due to his lack of fitness, Niculae played his first match for Dinamo since his return on 10 August, coming in as a substitute for Gabriel Boștină in a 3–2 win against Otopeni, netting the winning goal in the 85th minute. On 30 August, he scored against Universitatea Craiova, securing his team a 1–0 win. The first half of the season was a rather unproductive one, scoring just two goals in nine appearances. On 11 April 2009, Niculae scored his first hat-trick since his return, securing a 4–1 win for his team over Vaslui. Four days later, he scored twice in a 4–2 win against Rapid București, helping his team to qualify in the Romanian Cup semi-finals. On 21 April, Niculae netted another hat-trick in a 5–0 win against Gloria Bistrița. For the last ten minutes of the match, since there were no substitutes left, Niculae replaced the injured goalkeeper Bogdan Lobonț, managing to keep a clean sheet. Following Lobonț's long-term injury, Niculae has been appointed captain for the rest of the season. On 17 May, Niculae helped his team to maintain their lead three rounds before the final wrap-up, netting Dinamo's second in a 3–1 win against Politehnica Timișoara. However, three defeats in a row combined with Timișoara regaining their six points from CAS, saw Dinamo ending in third place. He ended his first season since his return scoring 12 times in Liga I, and 14 overall.

In July 2009, Niculae was close to a move to Terek Grozny, but the transfer collapsed since the Russians refused to pay the VAT. On 23 August, he scored the only goal in a 1–0 victory against CFR Cluj. Four days later, Niculae scored twice in a 3–0 second-leg victory that erased a three-goal aggregate deficit against Slovan Liberec. The match proceeded to extra time and a penalty shoot-out where he converted his spot kick, helping Dinamo achieve what was dubbed "The wonder from Liberec" and qualify for the Europa League group stages following a 9–8 win in the penalty shoot-out. His performance in the match earned him a grade 10 from the Gazeta Sporturilor newspaper. On 14 September, following a 0–1 defeat against Oțelul Galați, Gabriel Tamaș was removed as the captain of Dinamo, and replaced by Niculae. He suffered an injury, but since he was misdiagnosed by doctor Liviu Bătineanu, Niculae was sidelined for nearly three months. He made his come-back on 23 November, coming in as a substitute and missing a penalty in a 0–2 defeat against Politehnica Timișoara. Five days later, he scored the 2–0 goal against Unirea Alba Iulia, closing the scoreboard. On 3 December, Niculae scored the two goals that brought Dinamo the victory against Sturm Graz in a 2–1 home win from the Europa League group stage. On 21 February 2010, Niculae scored the 2–0 goal in the 17th minute against Universitatea Craiova, which proved to be the winning goal in their 2–1 win. On 6 May, Niculae scored in the 1–2 defeat against Politehnica Timișoara, ending a ten-match goalless strike. The match against Timișoara was his last of the season due to an injury. He ended the season with his team in sixth place in Liga I, netting four times in the championship, and eight overall.

On 15 July, Niculae was sent off in Europa League's first leg of the second qualifying round against Olimpia Bălți, receiving a two-match ban. He scored his first goal of the season on 8 August in a 2–2 draw against Pandurii, netting Dinamo's second with a last-minute equaliser. On 21 August, Niculae helped his team to demolish FCM Târgu Mureș, scoring Dinamo's fourth in a 6–2 win. On 17 October, Niculae scored from the penalty spot in the 35th minute, the winning goal in Dinamo's 2–1 win in the Eternal derby over Steaua București. This was also Niculae's first league goal against Steaua. On 26 October, he scored his final goal in 2010, opening the scoreboard against ALRO Slatina in a 3–1 win in the Romanian Cup.

==== Loan to Kavala ====
On 19 January 2011, it was confirmed that Niculae had joined Kavala on a six-month loan deal. He made his Kavala debut four days later in a 3–0 home win over Iraklis, wearing the number 29 shirt. He scored his first goal for Kavala in a 1–0 home win against Kerkyra on 6 February. On 27 February, Niculae opened the scoring in a 2–0 away win against PAOK. His goal was selected by EPAE as the Goal of the Round. On 3 April, he netted Kavala's only goal in a 1–3 away defeat to Olympiacos. He scored again in his next game, netting Kavala's equaliser in a 1–1 home draw against Skoda Xanthi. Niculae ended his spell in Super League Greece, having four goals in 12 appearances.

==== 2011–2012 ====
Despite Niculae being expected to leave, on 11 July he extended his contract until December 2012, accepting a 40% pay reduction. Niculae started the season with a goal in the first league game, netting Dinamo's only goal with a header in a 1–0 home win against FCM Târgu Mureș. He scored a brace in the second league game in a 5–0 away win against Gaz Metan Mediaș, the first for Dinamo on the Gaz Metan Stadium in the past 11 years. He continued his excellent form in the third round, scoring once from the penalty spot and providing one assist for Ionel Dănciulescu in a 2–0 win against Pandurii Târgu Jiu. He also scored once in a 1–2 away defeat against Vorskla Poltava in the first leg of the Europa League play-off, on 18 August. Ten days later, he netted the winning goal in a 2–1 victory against Oțelul Galați. On 25 September, he scored another brace against Petrolul Ploiești, taking his tally of goals to seven, his most prolific start of his career. He was also selected four times in the Team of the Week, after only eight rounds. On 17 October, Niculae scored a hat-trick against Ceahlăul, in a 5–0 away win. On 5 November, he scored another brace in a 3–2 win over CFR Cluj, netting the winning goal in stoppage time. On 5 December, he scored from the penalty spot in the Eternal derby, in a 1–3 defeat to Steaua. Twelve days later he converted a controversial penalty kick, in a 1–0 victory against FCM Târgu Mureș, securing Dinamo's position as winter champions at the end of 2011. On 12 February 2012, Niculae signed a new deal with Dinamo, extending his contract until 2014. Later that month, Niculae was appointed team captain, taking over the leadership from Dănciulescu. He scored in three matches in a row against Pandurii, Sportul Studențesc and Oțelul Galați, continuing his quest for the Golden Boot. He also received his first red card from Liga I against Oțelul, ending a run of 182 matches without being sent off. On 8 May, Niculae scored the only goal in a 1–0 victory against Voința Sibiu. On 23 May, Niculae captained Dinamo in the Romanian Cup final against Rapid București, until he was substituted in the 81st minute. Dinamo won its first trophy in five years, after a 1–0 victory. Niculae lifted the trophy along with Dănciulescu. He ended fifth in Liga I with Dinamo, netting 19 times in the league and 20 overall.

On 14 July, Niculae lifted his second trophy after Dinamo won 6–4 at the penalty shoot-out against CFR Cluj in the Romanian Supercup.

=== Vaslui ===
On 20 July 2012, Niculae signed a two-year contract with Vaslui, for an undisclosed fee, estimated by media to be around €300,000. Two days later, he was in the starting line-up, in Vaslui's opening against Rapid, making his league debut for his new team. One week later, Niculae scored Vaslui's third in a 3–0 home league victory over Petrolul Ploiești, marking his first goal in the yellow-green shirt. In August, Niculae scored Vaslui's goal in the third qualifying round of the Champions League, in a 1–4 home defeat to Fenerbahçe. Subsequently, in a 3–0 away win over Gloria Bistrița he scored once but missed a penalty. He also netted the final goal of a 3–1 victory against Steaua. Niculae scored his first hat-trick for Vaslui on 29 September against Concordia Chiajna in a 3–0 home win. On 21 October he scored the only goal of a 1–0 win, which came after a phase created by teammate Lucian Sânmărtean. He scored a brace in a 3–0 home victory against CSMS Iași on 26 November. He made his last appearance for the team on 6 December in a 0–0 draw against Petrolul Ploiești, totalling 11 goals by the end of the first half of the 2012–13 season.

In January 2013, Niculae was close to returning to Sporting Lisbon, but because during the 2012–13 season, he played for two teams, Dinamo and Vaslui, his transfer was cancelled.

=== Shandong Luneng ===
In February 2013, Niculae started negotiations with the Chinese squad Shandong Luneng and on 19 February, the Asian club announced that the player was officially signed. On 26 February, he scored his first goal for Shandong in a friendly match against Chongqing. He made his Chinese Super League debut by playing 81 minutes in the 1–0 victory against Dalian Aerbin in the first round of the season, scoring his first goal one week later in a 2–0 win over Changchun Yatai. He scored his second goal on 13 April in a 2–1 loss to Shanghai Shenhua, marking his final goal in just eight league appearances for Shandong.

=== Hoverla Uzhhorod ===
In September 2013, Niculae signed with Hoverla Uzhhorod where he was teammates with fellow Romanians Răzvan Cociș, Cristian Oroș and Alexandru Dandea. He made his Ukrainian Premier League debut on 5 October when he appeared for the final minutes of the 0–0 draw against Zorya Luhansk. On 27 October he scored his first goal for the team in a 2–1 loss to Chornomorets Odesa. One month later, he scored a brace in a 2–1 victory against Tavriya Simferopol. After the team ended the season in 12th place, Niculae wanted to leave because of the political tensions within Ukraine.

=== Şanlıurfaspor ===
In July 2014, he signed with Şanlıurfaspor in the Turkish second division. However, only one month later, without playing a single game, he and the club ended their collaboration, Niculae claiming it was a financial issue as he did not receive all the money promised from them.

=== Third spell at Dinamo ===
In January 2015, Niculae returned for a third spell at Dinamo București. In his first game since his return, he scored the only goal of the victory over Oțelul Galați with a header. He scored two more goals against Ceahlăul and Pandurii. He made his last Liga I appearance on 22 May 2015 in a 3–0 away victory against Petrolul Ploiești, totalling 221 matches with 95 goals in the competition.

== International career ==
After representing Romania at the U16 and U18 levels, Niculae was promoted to the U21 level. Niculae's form for Dinamo saw him selected for the Romania U21 team to play Bulgaria U21 on 3 March 1999, and he marked his debut with the second goal as Romania won 3–1. He played his first official match for Romania U21 on 26 March, in a 0–1 defeat against Slovakia U21, coming in as a substitute for Marius Luca in the second half. Despite playing all six remaining qualifiers, Niculae hasn't scored a single goal as Romania failed to qualify to the European Championship. Since he was still eligible to play for Romania U18, Niculae was called up by coach Gheorghe Cristoloveanu for the 2000 European Under-18 Championship qualifiers. He scored a brace in the first match against Bosnia and Herzegovina which ended with a 3–1 win, but he was sent off in the second match against Bulgaria alongside teammates Adrian Olah and Tiberiu Bălan, ending his career for Romania U18. Romania drew in the final match against Ukraine, thus failing to qualify for the play-off.

On 21 January 2000, Niculae was called up to Romania's senior team for the first time. On 2 February, he was in the starting line-up against Latvia, making his debut for the national team at only 18 years old. Just as he did while playing for Romania U21, Niculae marked his debut for the senior squad with a goal, netting Romania's second in a 2–0 win. Despite the fact that he scored 20 goals for Dinamo in the 1999–00 season, Niculae was not included by Emerich Ienei in the preliminary squad for UEFA Euro 2000.

On 2 September, Niculae scored a brace for Romania U21 against Lithuania in the first match in the 2002 European Championship qualifiers, marking his first goals in an official match. On 6 October, Niculae played his final match for the U21 squad, netting Romania's only goal in the 1–1 draw against European Championship holders Italy.

On 5 December, Niculae scored his first brace for Romania in a 2–3 defeat to Algeria. Three days later, he scored another brace against the same opponent. On 24 March 2001, Niculae played his first official match for Romania during the 2002 World Cup qualifiers in a 0–2 defeat to Italy. In those qualifiers, on 2 June, he scored another brace for the national team in a 2–0 win against rivals Hungary. He netted another double in the second leg against the Magyars which also ended in a 2–0 victory. He scored his tenth international goal on 10 November in a 2002 World Cup Play-off, where Romania lost 1–2 against Slovenia. Romania failed to qualify for the 2002 World Cup, since they managed only a draw in the second leg. On 20 August 2002, Niculae was recalled for Romania, ending a nine-month absence caused by a long-term injury.

On 28 April 2004, Niculae returned to the national team, coming as a late substitute in a 5–1 thrashing win against Germany, the worst away defeat for the Germans in the past 65 years. It was his first match for Romania since November 2002. On 8 September, Niculae scored a brace in a 2006 World Cup qualifying match against Andorra, ending a nearly three-year goalless strike for Romania.

On 12 March 2008, Niculae was recalled to play for Romania following a two-year break, last playing against Colombia in May 2006. He marked his return with an assist for Daniel Niculae and with a goal following Bănel Nicoliță's cross, winning against Russia with a crushing 3–0. On 15 May, he was included by Victor Pițurcă in the preliminary squad for UEFA Euro 2008. He was kept for the final 23-man squad for Euro 2008, where he wore the number 18 shirt. He played his first match from the "Group of Death" in a goalless draw against France, coming in as a substitute for Adrian Mutu in the second half. On 17 June, he was in the starting line-up in the third match of the group, against Netherlands. Romania lost 0–2, thus failing to advance further from the group stage.

On 27 January 2012, Niculae was handed the captaincy for the first time in a friendly against Turkmenistan, becoming the 89th captain in Romania's history. Romania won 4–0, with Niculae scoring a brace. His last appearance for the national team took place on 19 November 2013 in a 1–1 draw against Greece in the 2014 World Cup play-offs, failing to earn the qualification for the final tournament as the first leg was lost 3–1. Niculae has a total of 44 games with 15 goals scored for Romania.

== Personal life ==
On 29 June 2008, Niculae married Cristina Vasilescu after eight years of dating. She gave birth to their daughter, Raisa Elena Niculae, on 24 August 2011. Niculae had a conflict with his father for many years due to his relationship with Cristina. They eventually reconciled in late 2007.

Niculae was well known for his friendship with former Dinamo captain Cătălin Hîldan, who died on the pitch in a friendly match against Șantierul Naval Oltenița on 5 October 2000. They played together for both junior and senior squad. He dedicated his first league goal against Steaua to Hîldan. After the match, he gave his shirt to Hîldan's nephew, Cătălin who was named after him.

Despite sharing a birthplace, he has no connection with his namesake and fellow international, Daniel Niculae.

Niculae was nicknamed Săgeată (Arrow in Romanian).

== Career statistics ==
=== Club ===
Appearances and goals by club, season and competition
Club	Season	League			National cup (Note: Includes Cupa României, Taça de Portugal, Belgian Cup, Scottish Cup, Chinese FA Cup, Ukrainian Cup)		Europe		Other		Total	
Club	Season	Division	Apps	Goals	Apps	Goals	Apps	Goals	Apps	Goals	Apps	Goals
Dinamo București	1996–97	Divizia A	6	0	0	0	—		—		6	0
Dinamo București	1997–98	Divizia A	12	4	0	0	1 (Note: Appearances in UEFA Cup)	0	1 (Note: Appearance in Supercupa României)	2	14	6
Dinamo București	1998–99	Divizia A	28	7	4	2	—		—		32	9
Dinamo București	1999–00	Divizia A	27	13	5	3	4	4	1	2	37	22
Dinamo București	2000–01	Divizia A	27	20	5	5	2 (Note: Appearances in UEFA Champions League)	1	—		34	26
Dinamo București	Total		100	44	14	10	7	5	2	4	123	63
Sporting CP	2001–02	Primeira Liga	16	7	1	0	6	3	—		23	10
Sporting CP	2002–03	Primeira Liga	17	3	1	1	4 (Note: Two appearances in UEFA Champions League, two appearances in UEFA Cup)	0	1 (Note: Appearances in Supertaça Cândido de Oliveira)	1	23	5
Sporting CP	2003–04	Primeira Liga	14	3	0	0	0	0	—		14	3
Sporting CP	2004–05	Primeira Liga	12	1	0	0	4	1	—		16	2
Sporting CP	Total		59	14	2	1	14	4	1	1	76	20
Standard Liège	2005–06	Belgian First Division	26	4	6	1	—		—		32	5
Mainz 05	2006–07	Bundesliga	6	0	0	0	—		—		6	0
Inverness	2007–08	Scottish Premier League	35	8	1	0	—		2 (Note: Appearances in Scottish League Cup)	2	38	10
Dinamo București	2008–09	Liga I	24	12	2	2	1	0	—		27	14
Dinamo București	2009–10	Liga I	20	4	1	0	4 (Note: Appearances in UEFA Europa League)	4	—		25	8
Dinamo București	2010–11	Liga I	16	3	2	1	2	0	—		20	4
Dinamo București	2011–12	Liga I	29	19	4	0	3	1	—		36	20
Dinamo București	2012–13	Liga I	—		—		—		1	0	1	0
Dinamo București	Total		89	38	9	3	10	5	1	0	109	46
Kavala (loan)	2010–11	Super League Greece	12	4	—		—		—		12	4
Vaslui	2012–13	Liga I	19	11	1	0	3 (Note: Two appearances and one goal in UEFA Champions League, one appearance in UEFA Europa League)	1	—		23	12
Shandong Luneng	2013	Chinese Super League	8	2	1	1	—		—		9	3
Hoverla Uzhhorod	2013–14	Ukrainian Premier League	13	3	1	0	—		—		14	3
Dinamo București	2014–15	Liga I	13	3	—		—		2 (Note: Appearances in Cupa Ligii)	0	15	3
Career total			380	131	35	16	34	15	8	7	457	169

=== International ===
Appearances and goals by national team and year
National team	Year	Apps	Goals
Romania	2000	6	5
Romania	2001	12	5
Romania	2002	4	0
Romania	2003	0	0
Romania	2004	2	2
Romania	2005	2	0
Romania	2006	2	0
Romania	2007	0	0
Romania	2008	6	1
Romania	2009	3	0
Romania	2010	1	0
Romania	2011	1	0
Romania	2012	4	2
Romania	2013	1	0
Total		44	15

Scores and results list Romania's goal tally first, score column indicates score after each Niculae goal.

List of international goals scored by Marius Niculae
No.	Date	Venue	Opponent	Score	Result	Competition
1	2 February 2000	Pafiako Stadium, Paphos, Cyprus	Latvia	1–0	2–0	Friendly
2	5 December 2000	Stade de 19 Mai 1956, Annaba, Algeria	Algeria	1–0	2–3	Friendly
3	5 December 2000	Stade de 19 Mai 1956, Annaba, Algeria	Algeria	2–3	2–3	Friendly
4	8 December 2000	Stade de 19 Mai 1956, Annaba, Algeria	Algeria	2–0	3–2	Friendly
5	8 December 2000	Stade de 19 Mai 1956, Annaba, Algeria	Algeria	3–1	3–2	Friendly
6	2 June 2001	Stadionul Steaua, Bucharest, Romania	Hungary	1–0	2–0	2002 World Cup qualification
7	2 June 2001	Stadionul Steaua, Bucharest, Romania	Hungary	2–0	2–0	2002 World Cup qualification
8	15 August 2001	Bežigrad Stadium, Ljubljana, Slovenia	Slovenia	1–0	2–2	Friendly
9	5 September 2001	Népstadion, Budapest, Hungary	Hungary	1–0	2–0	2002 World Cup qualification
10	10 November 2001	Bežigrad Stadium, Ljubljana, Slovenia	Slovenia	1–0	1–2	2002 World Cup qualification
11	8 September 2004	Estadi Comunal d'Andorra la Vella, Andorra la Vella, Andorra	Andorra	3–0	5–1	2006 World Cup qualification
12	8 September 2004	Estadi Comunal d'Andorra la Vella, Andorra la Vella, Andorra	Andorra	4–1	5–1	2006 World Cup qualification
13	26 March 2008	Stadionul Steaua, Bucharest, Romania	Russia	3–0	3–0	Friendly
14	27 January 2012	Belek Stadium, Belek, Turkey	Turkmenistan	1–0	4–0	Friendly
15	27 January 2012	Belek Stadium, Belek, Turkey	Turkmenistan	4–0	4–0	Friendly

== Honours ==
Dinamo București

- Divizia A: 1999–00
- Cupa României: 1999–00, 2000–01, 2011–12
- Supercupa României: 2012

Sporting CP

- Primeira Liga: 2001–02
- Taça de Portugal: 2001–02
- Supertaça Cândido de Oliveira: 2002
- UEFA Cup runner-up: 2004–05

Individual

- Divizia A top scorer: 2000–01 (20 goals)
- Scottish Premier League Player of the Month: December 2007
