= Cornel Buta =

Romanian footballer

Personal information
- Date of birth: 1 November 1977 (age 49)
- Place of birth: Vaslui, Romania
- Height: 1.78 m (5 ft 10 in)
- Position: Right back

Senior career*
| Years | Team | Apps | (Gls) |
| 1996–1999 | FC Brașov | 88 | (6) |
| 2000 | Dinamo București | 9 | (3) |
| 2000–2004 | Rapid București | 25 | (0) |
| 2001 | → FC Brașov (loan) | 26 | (0) |
| 2003 | → Naţional București (loan) | 21 | (0) |
| 2004–2005 | Volyn Lutsk | 42 | (4) |
| 2006 | Pandurii Târgu Jiu | 12 | (1) |
| 2006–2010 | Politehnica Iaşi | 105 | (3) |
| 2010–2011 | Volyn Lutsk | 20 | (1) |
| Total | | 348 | (18) |

International career^{‡}
| 2000 | Romania | 1 | (0) |
- * Club domestic league appearances and goals as of 1 November 2010 ‡ National team caps and goals as of 10 August 2008

Cornel Buta (born 1 November 1977) is a Romanian retired footballer. He played as a right back and occasionally as a libero.

== Club career ==
He started his professional career at FC Brașov, playing in the first two football leagues in Romania. After three and a half seasons he transferred to Dinamo București as a replacement for Cosmin Contra, who moved to Deportivo Alavés earlier. He stayed only a few months, however, and at the beginning of the next season he moved to Rapid București, where he still could not confirm. As a result, he returned to FC Braşov, where he played for another season and a half.

After further spells at Rapid, twice, and FC Naţional, Buta played in Ukraine, at FC Volyn Lutsk, before returning in Romania, at Pandurii Târgu-Jiu. After a full season played, his next club would be Politehnica Iaşi, moving there as a free agent.

In his career, he won 4 trophies: Divizia A in 2000 with Dinamo, the Romanian Cup in 2000 with Dinamo and in 2002 with Rapid, and the Romanian Supercup in 2002 with Rapid

== Honours ==
FC Braşov

- Liga II: 1998–99

Dinamo București

- Liga I: 1999–00
- Romanian Cup: 1999–00

Rapid București

- Liga I: 2002–03
- Romanian Cup: 2001–02
- Supercupa României: 2002, 2003
