= Khalid Fouhami =

Moroccan footballer

Personal information
- Date of birth: 25 December 1972 (age 53)
- Place of birth: Casablanca, Morocco
- Height: 1.95 m (6 ft 5 in)
- Position: Goalkeeper

Team information
- Current team: Stade Marocain (manager)

Senior career*
Years	Team	Apps	(Gls)
1991–1994	Wydad AC		
1994–1996	Ittihad Tanger		
1996–1998	Maghreb de Fès		
1998–2000	Dinamo București	28	(1)
2000–2001	Beveren	29	(0)
2001–2003	Standard Liège	15	(0)
2003–2004	Académica Coimbra	6	(0)
2004	Alania Vladikavkaz	4	(0)
2004–2005	Visé	11	(0)
2005–2006	Portimonense	31	(0)
2006–2008	Raja CA	49	(0)
2008–2010	FUS Rabat (Note: The statistics for the 2008–09 Botola 2 season are unavailable.)	7	(0)
Total		180	(1)

International career
1999–2008	Morocco	35	(0)

Managerial career
- 2010–2014: Mohammed VI Football Academy
- 2014–2016: Morocco (GK coach)
- 2016–2019: Morocco U20 (GK coach)
- 2020: CRA
- 2021: Renaissance Zemamra
- 2023–: Stade Marocain
Medal record
Dinamo București
Winner	Romanian Cup	2000
- * Club domestic league appearances and goals

Khalid Fouhami (Arabic: خالد فهامي; born 25 December 1972) is a Moroccan football coach and a former goalkeeper. He is the manager of Stade Marocain.

== Football career ==
Fouhami was born in Casablanca. During his extensive career, he played for Wydad AC, IR Tanger, Maghreb Fez and FUS Rabat in Morocco, Dinamo București in Romania, Beveren, Standard Liège and Visétois in Belgium, Académica Coimbra and Portimonense in Portugal and Alania Vladikavkaz in Russia.

A Moroccan international for nine years, he represented his nation at the 2000, 2004 and 2008 Africa Cup of Nations.

== Honours ==
=== Club ===
Wydad AC

- Botola: 1992–93
- CAF Champions League: 1992

Maghreb Fez

- Botola 2: 1996–97

Dinamo București

- Divizia A: 1999–2000
- Cupa României: 1999–2000

FUS Rabat

- Botola 2: 2008–09
- Coupe du Trône: 2010

=== Country ===
Morocco

- Africa Cup of Nations: runner-up 2004
