= 1999–2000 Divizia A =

82nd season of top-tier football league in Romania

Divizia A
- Season: 1999–2000
- Champions: Dinamo București
- Relegated: Farul Constanţa; Oneşti; Reşiţa; Extensiv Craiova
- Champions League: Dinamo București
- UEFA Cup: Rapid București; Universitatea Craiova
- Intertoto Cup: Ceahlăul Piatra Neamţ
- Matches: 306
- Goals: 912 (2.98 per match)
- Top goalscorer: Marian Savu (20)
- Biggest home win: Ceahlăul 6–0 Oneşti; Dinamo 7–1 Oneşti; Naţional 6–0 Farul; Oţelul 8–2 Extensiv
- Biggest away win: Reşiţa 0–6 Dinamo
- Highest scoring: Oţelul 8–2 Extensiv
- Longest winning run: Dinamo (9)
- Longest unbeaten run: Dinamo (18)
- Longest losing run: Extensiv, Oneşti (6)

The 1999–2000 Divizia A was the eighty-second season of Divizia A, the top-level football league of Romania.

== Teams ==
Location of teams in 1999–2000 Divizia A

== League table ==
Pos	Team	Pld	W	D	L	GF	GA	GD	Pts	Qualification or relegation
1	Dinamo București (C)	34	27	3	4	93	40	+53	84	Qualification to Champions League second qualifying round
2	Rapid București	34	22	6	6	65	38	+27	72	Qualification to UEFA Cup qualifying round
3	Steaua București	34	18	3	13	62	56	+6	57 (Note: STE 3–0 CEA; CEA 0–2 STE)	
4	Ceahlăul Piatra Neamț	34	17	6	11	56	48	+8	57	Qualification to Intertoto Cup first round
5	Argeș Pitești	34	16	6	12	45	35	+10	54	
6	Gloria Bistrița	34	17	2	15	54	49	+5	53	
7	Bacău	34	15	6	13	40	39	+1	51	
8	Oțelul Galați	34	15	4	15	59	55	+4	49 (Note: OTE 2–0 PRO; PRO 1–1 OTE)	
9	Național București	34	15	4	15	61	44	+17	49	
10	Astra Ploiești	34	13	8	13	43	41	+2	47	
11	Petrolul Ploiești	34	14	5	15	48	55	−7	47	
12	Rocar București	34	15	2	17	52	52	0	47	
13	Universitatea Craiova	34	13	7	14	45	41	+4	46 (Note: CRA 1–0 BRA; BRA 0–1 CRA)	Qualification to UEFA Cup qualifying round
14	Brașov	34	14	4	16	53	43	+10	46	
15	Farul Constanța (R)	34	12	8	14	38	45	−7	44	Relegation to Divizia B
16	FC Onești (R)	34	9	3	22	37	92	−55	30	Relegation to Divizia B
17	CSM Reșița (R)	34	5	8	21	35	73	−38	23	Relegation to Divizia B
18	Extensiv Craiova (R)	34	4	5	25	26	66	−40	17	Relegation to Divizia B

Source: LT (in Romanian)
Rules for classification: 1) points; 2) head-to-head points; 3) head-to-head goal difference; 4) head-to-head goals scored; 5) goal difference; 6) number of goals scored.
(C) Champions; (R) Relegated

=== Positions by round ===
Team ╲ Round	1	2	3	4	5	6	7	8	9	10	11	12	13	14	15	16	17	18	19	20	21	22	23	24	25	26	27	28	29	30	31	32	33	34
Argeș Pitești	13	6	4	3	4	4	3	2	3	3	2	2	3	2	4	3	2	2	2	2	3	3	3	3	4	4	4	4	5	4	4	4	4	5
Astra Ploiești	8	12	15	12	6	5	6	5	7	9	12	8	6	5	5	5	6	7	8	7	7	6	7	8	6	7	6	8	9	9	9	10	8	10
Bacău	9	13	10	5	11	6	5	7	10	11	9	9	8	9	8	8	8	6	7	8	9	8	8	7	8	10	10	10	10	10	8	7	6	7
Brașov	10	15	17	18	15	16	14	14	13	14	14	14	15	13	13	15	16	16	16	14	12	13	11	10	12	12	12	12	14	13	14	13	15	14
CSM Reșița	14	16	18	17	18	18	18	18	18	17	18	18	18	18	17	18	17	17	17	17	17	17	17	17	17	17	17	17	17	17	17	17	17	17
Ceahlăul Piatra Neamț	16	9	6	4	2	2	2	3	2	2	3	3	2	4	3	4	3	3	4	4	4	4	4	4	3	3	3	3	3	3	3	3	3	4
Universitatea Craiova	15	8	12	14	16	17	17	17	17	18	16	17	16	16	15	14	9	9	9	9	8	9	10	11	13	13	13	15	15	14	12	14	10	13
Dinamo București	2	2	1	1	1	1	1	1	1	1	1	1	1	1	1	1	1	1	1	1	1	1	1	1	1	1	1	1	1	1	1	1	1	1
Extensiv Craiova	5	11	14	16	17	15	16	16	16	16	17	16	17	17	18	17	18	18	18	18	18	18	18	18	18	18	18	18	18	18	18	18	18	18
Farul Constanța	17	17	9	13	9	12	8	11	12	12	11	12	13	14	14	16	14	14	11	13	16	15	14	15	14	15	14	13	11	15	15	15	13	15
Gloria Bistrița	12	18	13	7	13	7	11	9	9	7	7	6	7	7	7	6	7	8	6	5	5	5	5	6	7	6	7	6	6	6	6	6	7	6
FC Onești	6	7	5	8	10	13	15	15	14	13	13	13	10	12	10	12	13	13	15	16	15	16	16	16	16	16	16	16	16	16	16	16	16	16
Oțelul Galați	4	1	2	2	3	3	4	4	4	6	6	7	9	8	9	11	12	11	13	11	13	11	12	12	10	9	9	7	8	7	7	9	11	8
Petrolul Ploiești	1	4	3	6	5	8	12	10	11	8	10	10	11	11	12	10	11	10	10	10	11	12	15	13	11	11	11	11	12	11	13	12	14	11
Național București	7	3	8	11	7	10	9	12	8	10	8	11	12	15	16	13	15	15	12	12	10	10	9	9	9	8	8	9	7	8	10	8	9	9
Rapid București	11	14	16	10	8	11	7	6	5	4	4	4	4	3	2	2	4	4	3	3	2	2	2	2	2	2	2	2	2	2	2	2	2	2
Rocar București	3	5	11	15	12	14	10	13	15	15	15	15	14	10	11	9	10	12	14	15	14	14	13	14	15	14	15	14	13	12	11	11	12	12
Steaua București	18	10	7	9	14	9	13	8	6	5	5	5	5	6	6	7	5	5	5	6	6	7	6	5	5	5	5	5	4	5	5	5	5	3

Source: LT (in Romanian)

=== Results ===
Home \ Away	ARG	AST	BAC	BRA	RES	CEA	UCR	DIN	EXT	FAR	GBI	ONE	OȚE	PET	NAT	RAP	ROC	STE
Argeș Pitești	—	1–1	1–1	1–0	1–1	1–1	2–0	2–3	2–0	2–1	2–0	2–0	3–0	1–0	3–1	0–1	3–1	4–0
Astra Ploiești	0–1	—	1–0	1–1	2–1	0–1	2–0	1–2	1–1	3–2	2–1	5–0	1–1	2–0	1–1	2–3	3–1	1–0
Bacău	1–0	1–2	—	1–0	1–0	2–0	3–0	0–3	1–0	1–1	3–2	3–0	1–0	3–0	1–1	0–0	1–0	2–1
Brașov	2–1	2–0	1–1	—	4–0	3–1	0–1	4–3	2–1	3–2	4–2	5–1	3–0	0–1	3–1	2–0	4–0	1–2
CSM Reșița	0–0	2–5	1–2	3–1	—	1–3	0–0	0–6	0–0	1–1	1–1	6–1	1–2	2–2	1–0	0–1	0–1	2–0
Ceahlăul Piatra Neamț	1–0	4–0	3–1	2–1	4–2	—	1–1	2–2	3–1	2–1	1–0	6–0	3–2	2–0	3–2	0–3	2–0	0–2
Universitatea Craiova	3–1	0–0	2–3	1–0	2–2	0–2	—	1–2	3–0	3–0	3–1	1–0	4–0	5–1	2–0	2–0	2–1	1–2
Dinamo București	4–0	2–1	2–1	3–1	2–1	1–1	5–2	—	3–0	4–0	5–0	7–1	3–2	4–1	1–0	2–1	3–0	3–2
Extensiv Craiova	2–1	0–1	0–2	0–1	1–0	0–0	2–3	0–1	—	1–3	1–2	0–0	3–0	0–0	1–2	1–2	2–1	0–3
Farul Constanța	1–0	1–1	3–0	0–0	3–1	1–0	2–0	0–2	1–0	—	2–1	3–1	1–1	2–1	2–0	1–1	0–1	2–1
Gloria Bistrița	2–0	2–0	2–0	2–0	2–0	5–4	1–0	1–0	1–0	2–1	—	2–0	2–3	4–0	1–0	1–2	2–1	4–0
FC Onești	1–2	1–0	1–0	3–2	2–1	1–1	0–0	2–4	3–2	2–1	3–2	—	0–3	5–1	1–0	2–5	1–5	1–3
Oțelul Galați	1–2	0–1	3–1	1–0	1–2	3–0	1–0	5–3	8–2	1–0	0–0	2–1	—	3–2	2–0	2–0	2–1	4–5
Petrolul Ploiești	1–1	1–0	1–0	1–0	4–2	1–0	0–0	1–2	2–0	0–0	1–2	4–1	2–1	—	1–0	4–2	4–1	5–1
Național București	4–1	1–0	2–2	2–0	5–1	5–1	1–0	1–3	2–0	6–0	3–1	3–0	1–1	4–1	—	2–3	2–0	3–0
Rapid București	1–0	1–1	2–1	2–1	4–0	1–2	3–1	4–0	4–2	0–0	2–1	3–1	2–1	2–0	3–2	—	1–1	2–2
Rocar București	0–3	2–1	3–0	1–0	4–0	2–0	2–2	1–2	3–1	2–0	3–1	5–1	3–2	2–1	2–1	0–1	—	1–2
Steaua București	0–1	4–1	1–0	2–2	5–0	3–0	1–0	1–1	5–2	1–0	2–1	3–0	2–1	1–4	2–3	1–3	2–1	—

Source: LT (in Romanian)
Legend: Blue = home team win; Yellow = draw; Red = away team win.

== Top goalscorers ==
Position	Player	Club	Goals
1	Marian Savu	Naţional București	20
2	Adrian Mutu	Dinamo București	18
3	Marian Ivan	Braşov	16
3	Claudiu Niculescu	Universitatea Craiova	16
5	Ionel Dănciulescu	Steaua București	14
5	Florin Petcu	Bacău	14

== Champion squad ==
Dinamo București

Goalkeepers: Ștefan Preda (30 / 0); Khalid Fouhami (Morocco) (4 / 0).
Defenders: Cornel Buta (9 / 3); Liviu Ciobotariu (9 / 0); Șerban Cristescu (1 / 0); Cornel Dobre (4 / 0); Daniel Florea (25 / 0); Sorin Iodi (2 / 0); Adrian Iordache (1 / 0); Giani Kiriță (32 / 3); Gheorghe Mihali (21 / 3); Valentin Năstase (26 / 0); Laurenţiu Opriceană (1 / 0); Tinel Petre (18 / 0); Mădălin Marius Popa (1 / 0); Iosif Tâlvan (9 / 0); Marian Vătavu (2 / 0).
Midfielders: Alexandru Bălțoi (2 / 1); Florin Cernat (10 / 0); Cristian Constantin (1 / 0); Marius Coporan (9 / 0); Cătălin Hîldan (29 / 1); Daniel Iftodi (29 / 4); Ioan Lupescu (29 / 6); Răzvan Pădurețu (1 / 0); Florentin Petre (22 / 7); Gabriel Popescu (9 / 0); Daniel Timofte (6 / 0); Cristian Vlad (12 / 1).
Forwards: Bogdan Aldea (10 / 1); Claudiu Drăgan (11 / 5); Bogdan Mara (8 / 2); Adrian Mihalcea (29 / 13); Adrian Mutu (18 / 18); Marius Niculae (27 / 12); Constantin Stan (1 / 0); Ion Vlădoiu (12 / 12).
(league appearances and goals listed in brackets)

Manager: Cornel Dinu.

== Attendances ==
#	Club	Average
1	Craiova	14,529
2	Dinamo 1948	7,588
3	Steaua	7,441
4	Reșița	7,206
5	FC Rapid	6,882
6	Oțelul	6,735
7	Brașov	6,176
8	Farul	5,629
9	Bacău	5,618
10	Onești	5,147
11	Astra	4,882
12	Petrolul	4,312
13	Național	4,059
14	Rocar	4,059
15	Extensiv	4,059
16	Argeș	3,588
17	Ceahlăul	3,559
18	Gloria	2,624
