= Emil Săndoi =

Romanian footballer and manager

Personal information
- Date of birth: 1 March 1965 (age 61)
- Place of birth: Craiova, Romania
- Height: 1.80 m (5 ft 11 in)
- Position: Centre-back

Youth career
- –1983: Universitatea Craiova

Senior career*
| Years | Team | Apps | (Gls) |
| 1983–1995 | Universitatea Craiova | 268 | (42) |
| 1995–1996 | Angers | 30 | (2) |
| 1996–1998 | Argeș Pitești | 42 | (4) |
| 1998–1999 | Universitatea Craiova | 40 | (3) |
| Total | | 380 | (51) |

International career
| 1987–1993 | Romania | 30 | (0) |

Managerial career
- 1998–1999: FC Universitatea Craiova (assistant)
- 1999–2000: FC Universitatea Craiova
- 2001–2002: Pandurii Târgu Jiu
- 2002: FC Universitatea Craiova
- 2003–2005: Pandurii Târgu Jiu
- 2006–2013: Romania U21
- 2008: Vaslui
- 2011: Romania (caretaker)
- 2014–2016: CS Universitatea Craiova
- 2016: Concordia Chiajna
- 2017–2019: Argeș Pitești
- 2020–2022: Chindia Târgoviște
- 2022–2023: Romania U21
- 2024–2025: Politehnica Iaşi
- * Club domestic league appearances and goals

Emil Săndoi (born 1 March 1965) is a Romanian professional football manager and former player.

== Career ==
A centre-back, who was born in Craiova and debuted in Divizia A with hometown side Universitatea Craiova in 1983.

Săndoi made his debut for the Romania national team in 1987 against Greece, and was chosen in the 1990 FIFA World Cup squad.

== Game interference ==
In a game between Chindia Târgoviște and Argeș in Romania's second division, Săndoi was standing on the side line as manager, and yet interfered in the match by tripping an opposition player.

== International stats ==
Appearances and goals by national team and year
| National team | Year | Apps | Goals |
|---|---|---|---|
| Romania | 1987 | 1 | 0 |
| Romania | 1988 | 5 | 0 |
| Romania | 1989 | 2 | 0 |
| Romania | 1990 | 4 | 0 |
| Romania | 1991 | 10 | 0 |
| Romania | 1992 | 3 | 0 |
| Romania | 1993 | 5 | 0 |
| Total | | 30 | 0 |

== Honours ==
=== Player ===
Universitatea Craiova

- Divizia A: 1990–91
- Cupa României: 1990–91, 1992–93

=== Coach ===
Universitatea Craiova

- Cupa României runner-up: 1999–00

Pandurii Târgu Jiu

- Divizia B: 2004–05
