= Daniel Iftodi =

Romanian footballer

Personal information
- Date of birth: 11 February 1968 (age 58)
- Place of birth: Beștepe, Tulcea County, Romania
- Height: 1.68 m (5 ft 6 in)
- Position: Left midfielder

Senior career*
Years	Team	Apps	(Gls)
1985–1987	Delta Tulcea		
1987–1988	FCM Progresul Brăila		
1988–1989	Victoria București	1	(0)
1989–1992	Gloria Bistriţa	57	(18)
1992–1993	Steaua București	11	(2)
1993–1994	Gloria Bistriţa	17	(2)
1994–1995	Steaua București	19	(3)
1994–1995	Gloria Bistriţa	49	(9)
1995–1996	Győri ETO FC	8	(0)
1996–1997	Gloria Bistriţa	28	(3)
1997–1998	Rapid București	31	(10)
1998–2000	Dinamo București	59	(13)
2000–2001	Rapid București	23	(3)
2001–2002	FCM Bacău	17	(0)
2002–2003	Dacia Unirea Brăila	6	(0)
2003–2006	Gloria Bistriţa	52	(6)
2006–2007	Laminorul Roman		
2007–2008	Marmaţia Sighet		
Total		378	(69)

Managerial career
- 2006–2007: Laminorul Roman
- 2007–2009: Marmaţia Sighet
- 2009–2010: Petrolul Videle
- 2014–2015: Delta Dobrogea Tulcea
- 2015–2016: Oltenița
- 2017–2018: Agricola Borcea
- 2019: Carmen București
- 2021–: CS Dinamo
- * Club domestic league appearances and goals as of 2 September 2018

Daniel Iftodi (born 11 February 1968 in Beștepe, Tulcea County) is a Romanian former football player, who played as a midfielder. He played for all the major Bucharest-based teams (Steaua București, Dinamo București and Rapid București), making 372 appearances in Liga I in the sixteen seasons in which he played top-flight football in Romania.

== Honours ==
Steaua Bucuresti:

- Liga I(3):1992–1993, 1993–1994, 1994–1995

Dinamo Bucuresti:

- Liga I(1):1999–2000
- Cupa României(1):1999–2000

Rapid Bucuresti:

- Cupa României(1):1997–1998
