= 2000–01 Cupa României =

Tournament details
- Country: Romania

Final positions
- Champions: Dinamo București
- Runners-up: Rocar București

The 2000–01 Cupa României was the 63rd edition of Romania's most prestigious football cup competition.

The title was won by Dinamo București against Rocar București.

== Format ==
The competition is an annual knockout tournament.

First round proper matches are played on the ground of the lowest ranked team, then from the second round proper the matches are played on a neutral location.

If a match is drawn after 90 minutes, the game goes into extra time, where it works golden goal rule. If the match is still tied, the result is decided by penalty kicks.

In the semi-finals, each tie is played as a two legs.

From the first edition, the teams from Divizia A entered in competition in sixteen finals, rule which remained till today.

== First round proper ==
Team 1	Score	Team 2
6 September 2000
Metrom Braşov (Div. B)	2–1 (a.e.t.)	(Div. A) Astra Ploieşti
Victoria Someșeni (Div. D)	2–5	(Div. A) Petrolul Ploiești
Dunărea Galați (Div. C)	1–2 (a.e.t.)	(Div. A) Foresta Suceava
Extensiv Craiova (Div. B)	0–3	(Div. A) Dinamo București
FC Sfântu Gheorghe (Div. C)	0–1	(Div. A) FCM Bacău
Pandurii Târgu Jiu (Div. B)	1–2	(Div. A) Gloria Bistrița
FC Baia Mare (Div. B)	1–0	(Div. A) Gaz Metan Mediaș
CSM Reșița (Div. B)	1–3	(Div. A) Ceahlăul Piatra Neamț
Sportul Studențesc București (Div. B)	1–0	(Div. A) FC Brașov
Dacia Unirea Brăila (Div. C)	1–2 (a.e.t.)	(Div. A) Rocar București
Jiul Petroșani (Div. B)	0–4	(Div. A) Rapid București
Olimpia Gherla (Div. C)	0–4	(Div. A) Steaua București
Oltchim Râmnicu Vâlcea (Div. C)	0–2	(Div. A) Argeș Pitești
Metalul Filipeştii de Pădure (Div. C)	0–2	(Div. A) Oțelul Galați
CSM Medgidia (Div. C)	2–3	(Div. A) Naţional București
AS Curtea de Argeș (Div. C)	0–3	(Div. A) FC U Craiova

== Second round proper ==
Team 1	Score	Team 2
7 November 2000
Petrolul Ploiești	2–1	FCM Bacău
8 November 2000
Metrom Brașov	0–1	Naţional București
Argeș Pitești	2–4	Sportul Studențesc București
FC Baia Mare	0–1	Rapid București
Oțelul Galați	2–1	Gloria Bistrița
Steaua București	2–1	Foresta Suceava
Dinamo București	3–2	FC U Craiova
Rocar București	2–0	Ceahlăul Piatra Neamț

== Quarter-finals ==
Team 1	Score	Team 2
29 November 2000
Petrolul Ploiești	1–0 (a.e.t.)	Steaua București
Sportul Studențesc București	0–0 (a.e.t.) (4–3 p)	Oțelul Galați
Naţional București	0–1	Rocar București
30 November 2000
Rapid București	1–2	Dinamo București

== Semi-finals ==
The matches were played on 4 April and 2 May 2001.

Team 1	Agg.	Team 2	1st leg	2nd leg
Sportul Studențesc București	3–5	Dinamo București	2–2	1–3
Rocar București	4–1	Petrolul Ploiești	3–0	1–1

== Final ==
16 June 2001
21:30 EEST

Dinamo București	4–2	Rocar București
Mihalcea 6', 72'; Niculae 55', 68' (pen.)	Report	Ursu 9'; Nicolae 30'

Stadionul Naţional
Attendance: 26,000
Referee: Urs Meier (Switzerland)

Cupa României 2000–01 winners

9th title
