= 1999–2000 Cupa României =

1999–00 Cupa României
Tournament details
- Country: Romania

Final positions
- Champions: Dinamo București
- Runners-up: FC U Craiova

The 1999–2000 Cupa României was the 62nd edition of Romania's most prestigious football cup competition.

The title was won by Dinamo București against FC U Craiova.

== Format ==
The competition is an annual knockout tournament.

First round proper matches are played on the ground of the lowest ranked team, then from the second round proper the matches are played on a neutral location.

If a match is drawn after 90 minutes, the game goes into extra time. If the match is still tied, the result is decided by penalty kicks.

In the semi-finals, each tie is played as a two legs.

From the first edition, the teams from Divizia A entered in competition in sixteen finals, rule which remained till today.

== First round proper ==
Team 1	Score	Team 2
21 September 1999
Hondor Agigea (Div. C)	1–1 (a.e.t.) (3-4 p)	(Div. A) Rapid București
West Petrom Arad (Div. C)	0–1	(Div. A) Steaua București
Curtea de Argeș (Div. C)	0–3	(Div. A) Național București
Inter Petrila (Div. C)	1–3	(Div. A) Astra Ploiești
22 September 1999
Vrancart Adjud (Div. C)	0–1	(Div. A) CSM Reșița
Telecom Arad (Div. C)	1–3	(Div. A) FC U Craiova
Petrolul Berca (Div. C)	3–2 (a.e.t.)	(Div. A) Farul Constanța
FC Brașov (Div. A)	4–1	(Div. A) FC Onești
Tractorul Brașov (Div. B)	1–4	(Div. A) Dinamo București
Cimentul Fieni (Div. B)	1–2 (a.e.t.)	(Div. A) Oțelul Galați
Metalul Filipeștii de Pădure (Div. C)	0–1	(Div. A) Petrolul Ploiești
Ceahlăul Piatra Neamț (Div. A)	4–1	(Div. A) Extensiv Craiova
Foresta Suceava (Div. B)	1–2 (a.e.t.)	(Div. A) Argeș Pitești
Progresul Șomcuta Mare (Div. C)	0–1 (a.e.t.)	(Div. A) FCM Bacău
Oțelul Ștei (Div. D)	0–3	(Div. A) Rocar București
Pandurii Târgu Jiu (Div. C)	1–2 (a.e.t.)	(Div. A) Gloria Bistrița

== Second round proper ==
Team 1	Score	Team 2
12 October 1999
Rapid București	1–0	Gloria Bistrița
FCM Bacău	1–0	Ceahlăul Piatra Neamț
FC U Craiova	1–0	Steaua București
Național București	4–2	FC Brașov
13 October 1999
Petrolul Berca	0–2	Petrolul Ploiești
Dinamo București	3–1	Rocar București
Oțelul Galați	2–1 (a.e.t.)	Astra Ploiești
Argeș Pitești	1–3	CSM Reșița

== Quarter-finals ==
Team 1	Score	Team 2
10 November 1999
Dinamo București	3–2	Național București
Rapid București	2–1	FCM Bacău
FC U Craiova	1–0	Petrolul Ploiești
CSM Reșița	1–2	Oțelul Galați

== Semi-finals ==
The matches were played on 15 March and 12 April 2000.

Team 1	Agg.	Team 2	1st leg	2nd leg
Oțelul Galați	1–5	Dinamo București	0–2	1–3
FC U Craiova	3–2	Rapid București	2–0	1–2

== Final ==
13 May 2000
20:30 EEST

Dinamo București	2–0	Universitatea Craiova
Niculae 6' (pen.); Hîldan 89'	Report

Stadionul Naţional, Bucharest
Attendance: 55,000
Referee: Sorin Corpodean (Romania)

Cupa României 1999–00 winners

8th title
