= AFC Rocar București =

Defunct football club in Romania

Rocar ANEFS București
- Full name: Asociația Fotbal Club Rocar București
- Nicknames: Bercenarii (The People from Berceni)
- Short name: Rocar
- Founded: 1953
- Dissolved: 2009
- Ground: ANEFS
- Capacity: 6,000
| Home colours | Away colours |

Rocar București was a Romanian professional football club based in Bucharest, founded in 1953 and dissolved in 2009. The club had a meteoric appearance in the forefront of Romanian football. Promoted in 1999, the club from Drumul Găzarului Street in the Berceni Neighborhood, has made way back two years later. Also, Rocar reached the Cupa României final in the 2000–01 season.

== History ==
The club was founded in 1953 under the name of Uzina de Autobuze București, being under the tutelage of the Romanian bus manufacturer with the same name, and competed in the Bucharest Municipal Championship.

Autobuzul was promoted to Divizia C at the end of the 1967–68 season, finishing 1st in Series I of the Bucharest Municipal Championship. However, Autobuzul lost the Municipal Championship final to Voința București.

In the first season in the third division, ”Bercenarii” finished in 4th place, and in the following season, Autobuzul won Series IV of Divizia C but missed promotion to the second division, finishing 4th in the play-off group held in Brașov. The squad included the following players: Ocea, Pandele, Opriș, Diaconu, Baicu, Ivan, Gerea, Rențea, Tănase, Andrei, Cărbuneanu, Radu, Postelnicu, Popescu, Jipa, Bobin, Vîrban, Constantin Tiniche, Dincă, Petculescu and Pipoi.

After another two seasons in Divizia C, finishing 12th in the 1970–71 season and 3rd in the 1971–72 season, Autobuzul managed to promote to Divizia B. This promotion was achieved at the end of the 1972–73 season, when the team finished in 2nd place. The club’s leadership included engineer Vasile Cornac as association president and C. Băcanu as head of the football division. Coach Emil Samureanu was responsible for this achievement, assembling a squad of players who contributed to the team's success. The team included players such as Matache, Pandele, Diaconu, Gostin, Popescu, Bobin, Radu, Cosma, Maruneac, C. Tiniche, Chiriță, Cațaros, Stănescu, Ivan, Bică, Melencovici, Nicolau, Ion Cățoi, Rențea, Dăncescu, Ghiță, Riocsan, Petculescu, and Ciferidis.

In Divizia B, Autobuzul was assigned to Series II and played three consecutive seasons. The team finished its first season in the second division in 11th place, two points above the relegation line, followed by a 7th-place finish in the 1974–75 season. However, Autobuzul was relegated at the end of the 1975–76 season, finishing in last place.

Autobuzul returned to second division at the end of the 1988–89 season, finishing 1st in the Series V of Divizia C. The squad coached by Gheorghe Pareșcura was composed from following players: Ene, C. Cristescu, Marius Curelea, Roșu, Ursu, Dumitru, Dițu, Virgil Cârstea, Salami, C. Nicolae, Iliescu, Silviu Cristescu, Mihai Dărăban, Iordache, Pantelimon, Butoi, M. Ploaie, R. Voinea and Tănase.

== Chronology of names ==
| Name | Period |
|---|---|
| Uzina de Autobuze București | 1953–1968 |
| Autobuzul București | 1968–1993 |
| Rocar București | 1993–2002 |
| Rocar ANEFS București | 2005–2009 |

- Note: 3 years of inactivity between 2002 and 2005, and the team was refounded as Rocar ANEFS București in the Liga IV.

== Stadium ==
Rocar played its home matches at the ANEFS Stadium in Bucharest, which has a capacity of 6,000 people. Built in 1960, the stadium was previously known as Autobuzul and later as Rocar.

== Honours ==
Liga II

- Runners-up (1): 1998–99

Liga III

- Winners (4): 1969–70, 1976–77, 1985–86, 1988–89
- Runners-up (1): 1972–73

Bucharest Municipal Championship

- Runners-up (1): 1967–68

Cupa României

- Runners-up (1): 2000–01

== Notable former players ==
- (Romania) Dan Alexa
- (Romania) Silviu Bălace
- (Romania) Romulus Buia
- (Romania) Augustin Călin
- (Romania) Sorin Colceag
- (Romania) Cornel Dobre
- (Romania) Victoraş Iacob
- (Romania) Toma Zamfir
- (Romania) Marius Mitu
- (Romania) Gheorghe Mulţescu
- (Romania) Eugen Nae
- (Romania) Victor Naicu
- (Romania) Cătălin Necula
- (Romania) Bogdan Nicolae
- (Romania) Marian Pană
- (Romania) Adrian Pitu
- (Romania) Daniel Prodan
- (Romania) Rică Răducanu
- (Romania) Daniel Rednic
- (Romania) Zoltan Ritli
- (Romania) Cristian Silvășan
- (Romania) Romeo Stancu
- (Romania) Mihai Stoichiţă
- (Romania) Gheorghe Tătaru
- (Romania) Iulian Tameș
- (Romania) Florin Tene
- (Romania) Daniel Tudor
- (Romania) Bogdan Vrăjitoarea

== Former managers ==
- (Romania) Costică Marinescu (1955–1957)
- (Romania) Gheorghe Bărbulescu (1961–1962)
- (Romania) Costică Marinescu (1968–1969)
- (Romania) Vasile Copil (1978–1980)
- (Romania) Nicolae Oaidă (1981–1982)
- (Romania) Dumitru Dumitriu (1982–1984)
- (Romania) Gheorghe Mulțescu (1988)
- (Romania) Mihai Stoichiță (1992–1993)
- (Romania) Ionel Dinu (1993–1994)
- (Romania) Aurel Țicleanu (1996–1997)
- (Romania) Silviu Dumitrescu (1998–1999)
- (Romania) Florin Marin (1999–2000)
- (Romania) Dumitru Dumitriu (2000–2001)
- (Romania) Marian Mihail (2001–2002)
- (Romania) Marius Șumudică (2006–2007)
