= 1992 Cupa României final =

- Event: 1991–92 Cupa României
Steaua București	Politehnica Timişoara
Divizia A	Divizia A
1	1
- Steaua won 3–2 on penalties
- Date: 24 June 1992
- Venue: Stadionul Regie, Bucharest
- Referee: Adrian Porumboiu (Romania)
- Attendance: 8,000

The 1992 Cupa României final was the 54th final of Romania's most prestigious cup competition. The final was played at the Stadionul Regie in Bucharest on 24 June 1992 and was contested between Divizia A sides Steaua București and Politehnica Timişoara. The cup was won by Steaua on penalties.

== Route to the final ==
FC Steaua București

Round of 32	Unirea Dej	0–4	Steaua București
Round of 16	Unirea Alba Iulia	0–3	Steaua București
Quarter-finals 1st Leg	Steaua București	3–0	Sportul Studenţesc București
Quarter-finals 2nd Leg	Sportul Studenţesc București	0–3 (0–6 on Agg.)	Steaua București
Semi-finals 1st Leg	Steaua București	3–1	Universitatea Craiova
Semi-finals 2nd Leg	Universitatea Craiova	3–2 (4–5 on Agg.)	Steaua București

FC Politehnica Timişoara

Round of 32	Unirea Seini	0–1 (a.e.t.)	Politehnica Timişoara
Round of 16	Politehnica Timişoara	2–0	Electroputere Craiova
Quarter-finals 1st Leg	Dunărea Călăraşi	1–0	Politehnica Timişoara
Quarter-finals 2nd Leg	Politehnica Timişoara	2–0 (2–1 on Agg.)	Dunărea Călăraşi
Semi-finals 1st Leg	Politehnica Timişoara	1–0	Farul Constanţa
Semi-finals 2nd Leg	Farul Constanţa	0–1 (0–2 on Agg.)	Politehnica Timişoara

== Match details ==
24 June 1992
17:00 EET

Steaua București	1–1 (a.e.t.)	Politehnica Timişoara
Andraşi 14'	Report	Băban 20'
Penalties
Stan (penalty scored); Vlădoiu (penalty scored); Andraşi (penalty scored); Bucur (penalty missed)	3–2	(penalty scored) Varga; (penalty scored) Roşu; (penalty missed) Băban; (penalty missed) Stoicov; (penalty missed) Crăciun

Stadionul Regie, Bucharest
Attendance: 8,000
Referee: Adrian Porumboiu (Romania)

Steaua București	Politehnica Timişoara

STEAUA BUCUREŞTI:
GK	1	(Romania) Daniel Gherasim
DF	2	(Romania) Aurel Panait
DF	4	(Romania) Anton Doboş
DF	6	(Romania) Bogdan Bucur
DF	3	(Romania) Nicolae Ungureanu	(substituted off) 73'
MF	5	(Romania) Cristian Mustacă
MF	10	(Romania) Basarab Panduru
MF	11	(Romania) Ilie Stan
MF	8	(Romania) Ilie Dumitrescu
FW	7	(Romania) Alexandru Andraşi
FW	9	(Romania) Marian Popa	(substituted off) 54'
Substitutes:
FW	18	(Romania) Ion Vlădoiu	(substituted on) 54'
DF	14	(Romania) Cornel Cristescu	(substituted on) 73'
Manager:
(Romania) Victor Piţurcă

POLITEHNICA TIMIŞOARA:
GK	1	(Romania) Ioan Almășan
DF	2	(Romania) Constantin Varga
DF	3	(Romania) Tiberiu Csik
DF	6	(Romania) Petru Andreaş
DF	4	(Romania) Adrian Stoicov
DF	5	(Romania) Ion Roşu
MF	7	(Romania) Emilian Diaconescu
MF	8	(Romania) Adrian Crăciun
MF	11	(Romania) Octavian Popescu	(substituted off) 100'
FW	9	(Romania) Marcel Băban
FW	10	(Romania) Sorin Vlaicu	(substituted off) 76'
Substitutes:
MF	15	(Romania) Călin Rosenblum	(substituted on) 76'
DF	14	(Romania) Florin Bătrânu	(substituted on) 100'
Manager:
(Romania) Ion Ionescu

MATCH OFFICIALS

- Assistant referees:
  - (Romania) Ilie Coţ
  - (Romania) Cornel Corocan
- Fourth official:

MAN OF THE MATCH

MATCH RULES

- 90 minutes.
- 30 minutes extra-time (15-minute intervals)
- Penalty shoot-out if scores level after extra time.
- Seven named substitutes
- Maximum of 3 substitutions.
