= 1995–96 FC Dinamo București season =

FC Dinamo București
1995–96 season
- Head coach: Remus Vlad (until November); Florin Cheran (until December); Marian Bondrea (from February)
- Divizia A: 5th
- Romanian Cup: Quarter-finals
- UEFA Cup: Preliminary round
- Top goalscorer: Ionel Dănciulescu (14 goals)

The 1995–96 season was FC Dinamo București's 47th season in Divizia A. Dinamo finished 5th in the league and reached the quarter-finals of the Romanian Cup. Dinamo had 15 new players during the season.

== Players ==
=== Squad information ===
Squad at end of season

Note: Flags indicate national team as defined under FIFA eligibility rules; some limited exceptions apply. Players may hold more than one non-FIFA nationality.

No.	Pos.	Nation	Player
—	GK	ROU	Florin Prunea
—	GK	ROU	Florin Tene
—	GK	ROU	Daniel Tudor
—	GK	ROU	Stelian Bordeianu
—	DF	ROU	Cosmin Contra
—	DF	ROU	Zoltan Kadar
—	DF	ROU	Florin Bătrânu
—	DF	ROU	Ion Sburlea
—	DF	ROU	Florin Macavei
—	DF	ROU	Florin Lazăr
—	DF	ROU	Claudiu Mutu
—	DF	ROU	Claudiu Cornaci
—	DF	ROU	Levente Csik
—	DF	ROU	Constantin Varga
—	DF	ROU	Iosif Tâlvan

No.	Pos.	Nation	Player
—	MF	ROU	Leontin Grozavu
—	MF	ROU	Marius Cheregi
—	MF	ROU	Mihai Tararache
—	MF	ROU	Narcis Mohora
—	MF	ROU	Cezar Dinu
—	MF	ROU	Cătălin Hîldan
—	MF	ROU	Dorin Zotincă
—	MF	ROU	Florentin Petre
—	MF	ROU	Ionel Fulga
—	MF	ROU	Mihai Iosif
—	MF	ROU	Costel Pană
—	MF	ROU	Cătălin Stoian
—	MF	ROU	Călin Gabriel Pantelimon
—	MF	ROU	Dumitru V.Gheorghe
—	MF	ROU	Dumitru Mere
—	MF	ROU	Lucian Balaban
—	MF	ROU	Dănuț Lupu
—	MF	ROU	Dorin Mateuț
—	MF	ROU	Sebastian Moga
—	MF	ROU	Marius Coporan
—	FW	ROU	Mihai Drăguş
—	FW	BIH	Nikola Jokišić
—	FW	ROU	Ionel Dănciulescu
—	FW	ROU	Marian Savu
—	FW	ROU	Marian Ivan
—	FW	ROU	Daniel Baston

== League table ==
Pos	Team	Pld	W	D	L	GF	GA	GD	Pts	Qualification or relegation
1	Steaua București (C)	34	21	8	5	79	30	+49	71	Qualification to Champions League qualifying round
2	Național București	34	18	6	10	60	44	+16	60	Qualification to UEFA Cup qualifying round
3	Rapid București	34	18	5	11	59	33	+26	59	Qualification to UEFA Cup qualifying round
4	Universitatea Craiova	34	17	6	11	45	30	+15	57	Qualification to Intertoto Cup group stage
5	Dinamo București	34	15	7	12	40	37	+3	52	Qualification to Intertoto Cup group stage
6	Petrolul Ploiești	34	16	3	15	44	38	+6	51	
7	Politehnica Timișoara	34	14	7	13	58	47	+11	49 (Note: TIM 3-1 FAR; FAR 1-4 TIM)	
8	Farul Constanța	34	15	4	15	56	49	+7	49	
9	Universitatea Cluj	34	14	6	14	41	40	+1	48	
10	Brașov	34	13	7	14	38	60	−22	46	
11	Bacău	34	15	0	19	40	58	−18	45	
12	Gloria Bistrița	34	14	3	17	41	38	+3	45	Qualification to Cup Winners' Cup qualifying round
13	Oțelul Galați	34	14	3	17	42	46	−4	45	
14	Sportul Studențesc București	34	12	7	15	33	35	−2	43 (Note: SPO 1-0 CEA; CEA 1-0 SPO)	
15	Ceahlăul Piatra Neamț	34	13	4	17	34	46	−12	43	
16	Argeș Pitești	34	12	6	16	39	52	−13	42	
17	Inter Sibiu (R)	34	10	7	17	29	48	−19	37	Relegation to Divizia B
18	Politehnica Iași (R)	34	9	3	22	27	74	−47	30	Relegation to Divizia B

Source: LT (in Romanian)
Rules for classification: 1) points; 2) head-to-head points; 3) head-to-head goal difference; 4) head-to-head goals scored; 5) goal difference; 6) number of goals scored. Head-to-Head: used when head-to-head record is used to rank tied teams.
(C) Champions; (R) Relegated

== Results ==
Dinamo's score comes first

=== Legend ===
Win	Draw	Loss

=== Divizia A ===
Date	Opponent	Venue	Result	Scorers
12 August 1995	Oțelul Galați	H	2–0	Lupu 26', Mateuț 62'
18 August 1995	Ceahlăul Piatra Neamț	A	0–2	
26 August 1995	FC Brașov	H	3–1	Mateuț 27', 47'(p), Dănciulescu 74'
30 August 1995	Gloria Bistrița	A	0–2	
9 September 1995	FC Argeș	H	3–1	Lupu 39', Grozavu 51', Mateuț 77'(p)
16 September 1995	Farul Constanța	A	2–1	Dănciulescu 70', Mateuț 75'
22 September 1995	Steaua București	H	1–1	Csik 71'
1 October 1995	Sportul Studențesc	A	1–0	Dănciulescu 53'
4 October 1995	Inter Sibiu	H	2–1	Petre 17', Varga 86'
14 October 1995	Politehnica Iași	A	0–0	
21 October 1995	Politehnica Timișoara	H	3–0	Mateuț 15', Dănciulescu 42', Petre 53'
25 October 1995	AS Bacău	A	0–2	
29 October 1995	FC Național	H	0–3	
4 November 1995	Petrolul Ploiești	A	0–1	
9 November 1995	Universitatea Craiova	H	2–1	Dănciulescu 20', Mateuț 63'(p)
18 November 1995	Universitatea Cluj	H	1–0	Mateuț 59'
25 November 1995	Rapid București	A	0–2	
29 November 1995	Oțelul Galați	A	2–0	Varga 34', Dănciulescu 55'
2 December 1995	Ceahlăul Piatra Neamț	H	0–0	
9 December 1995	FC Brașov	A	1–2	Grozavu 16'
13 December 1995	Gloria Bistrița	H	2–1	
27 February 1996	FC Argeș	A	0–1	
2 March 1996	Farul Constanța	H	2–1	
6 March 1996	Steaua București	A	2–4	
9 March 1996	Sportul Studențesc	H	0–1	
16 March 1996	Inter Sibiu	A	0–0	
20 March 1996	Politehnica Iași	H	2–0	
23 March 1996	Politehnica Timișoara	A	2–2	
30 March 1996	AS Bacău	H	3–0	
6 April 1996	FC Național	A	1–1	
10 April 1996	Petrolul Ploiești	H	1–0	
13 April 1996	Universitatea Craiova	A	1–3	
17 April 1996	Universitatea Cluj	A	0–2	
20 April 1996	Rapid București	H	1–1	

=== Cupa României ===
Round	Date	Opponent	Venue	Result	Goalscorers
R of 32	16 December 1995	CSM Reșița	A	1–0	
R of 16	20 December 1995	Gaz Metan Mediaș	N (Brașov)	1–0	
QF	13 March 1996	Steaua București	N	0–1	

=== UEFA Cup ===
8 August 1995

Dinamo București (Romania)	0–1	(Bulgaria) Levski Sofia
	Report	Ivanov 29'

Stadionul Dinamo, Bucharest
Attendance: 6,000
Referee: Roelof Luinge (Netherlands)
22 August 1995

Levksi Sofia (Bulgaria)	1–1 (a.e.t.)	(Romania) Dinamo București
Vasilev 110'	Report	Lupu 70'

Vasil Levski National Stadium, Sofia
Attendance: 10,000
Referee: Loris Stafoggia (Italy)

Levski Sofia won 2–1 on aggregate.
