= Florin Bătrânu =

Romanian footballer

Personal information
- Full name: Florin Ionel Cornelaș Bătrânu
- Date of birth: 19 March 1971 (age 55)
- Place of birth: Oravița, Romania
- Height: 1.84 m (6 ft 0 in)
- Positions: Defender; midfielder

Team information
- Current team: Politehnica Timișoara (chief scout)

Youth career
- Viitorul Timișoara

Senior career*
Years	Team	Apps	(Gls)
1988–1990	CFR Timișoara (Note: The statistics for the 1989–90 Divizia B season are unavailable.)	11	(0)
1990–1994	Politehnica Timișoara	94	(9)
1994–1995	Național București	35	(2)
1996–1999	Dinamo București	106	(20)
1999	Leiria	0	(0)
1999–2000	Universitatea Craiova	25	(2)
2001	BFC Dynamo	13	(4)
2001	UM Timișoara	9	(2)
2002	Kispest Honvéd	23	(1)
2003–2006	Politehnica Timișoara	52	(0)
Total		368	(40)

International career
1995–2000	Romania	8	(0)

Managerial career
- 2008–2009: CFR Timișoara
- 2021: Dumbrăvița
- 2021–2025: Dumbrăvița (head of youth development)
- 2021–2024: Romania Women (assistant)
- 2025–: Politehnica Timișoara (chief scout)
- * Club domestic league appearances and goals

Florin Ionel Cornelaș Bătrânu (born 19 March 1971), is a Romanian former professional footballer who played as a defender or midfielder, currently chief scout at Liga II club Politehnica Timișoara.

== Club career ==
Bătrânu was born on 19 March 1971 in Oravița, Romania and began playing junior-level football at Viitorul Timișoara. He started his senior career during the 1988–89 Divizia B season at CFR Timișoara. In 1990, he joined Politehnica Timișoara, making his Divizia A debut on 14 September under coach Constantin Rădulescu in a 3–0 away victory against Petrolul Ploiești. He made his debut in European competitions in a 2–0 victory against Sporting Lisbon in the second round of the 1990–91 UEFA Cup. Politehnica reached the 1992 Cupa României final, in which coach Ion Ionescu sent Bătrânu to replace Octavian Popescu during extra time, prior to their penalty shoot-out loss to Steaua București. Subsequently, he played in a 1–1 draw against Real Madrid in the first round of the 1992–93 UEFA Cup.

After Politehnica suffered relegation at the end of the 1993–94 season, Bătrânu joined Național București. In 1995, he moved to Dinamo București for a four-season spell. He made four appearances in the 1996 Intertoto Cup and played in both legs of the 4–1 aggregate loss to Knattspyrnufélag Reykjavíkur in the first qualifying round of the 1997–98 UEFA Cup. Domestically, he scored a career-best eight goals during the 1997–98 season and helped the team finish second in the 1998–99 championship. Following the end of his contract with Dinamo, Bătrânu signed with Portuguese side Leiria. However, Leiria terminated Bătrânu's contract because Dinamo demanded a transfer fee to release his registration. Afterwards, he returned to Romania and joined Universitatea Craiova. Bătrânu helped the team reach the 2000 Cupa României final, where he played the entire match under coach Emil Săndoi in the 2–0 loss to Dinamo. He also played in both legs of the 2–1 aggregate loss to Pobeda in the 2000–01 UEFA Cup qualifying round.

Bătrânu joined German fourth-tier side BFC Dynamo, where he became teammates with fellow Romanians Dorel Zegrean, Aurel Panait, Dănuț Oprea and Silvian Cristescu. The team won the 2000–01 NOFV-Oberliga Nord and then played a two-legged promotion play-off, losing 5–2 on aggregate to 1. FC Magdeburg. Bătrânu started the 2001–02 season at UM Timișoara, but midway through it he switched countries by moving to Hungary to join Kispest Honvéd. He made his Nemzeti Bajnokság I debut on 2 March 2002 under coach Lajos Détári, playing alongside compatriots Cristian Dulca, Dorel Balint and Marius Sasu in a 3–2 loss to Haladás. On 24 April, he scored the winning goal in the 2–1 victory over Videoton FC Fehérvár. Bătrânu also played in both legs of the 1–0 aggregate loss to Žalgiris in the first round of the 2002 Intertoto Cup.

In 2003, Bătrânu made a comeback to Politehnica Timișoara. He made his last Divizia A appearance on 4 December 2005 in Politehnica's 1–0 loss to Dinamo, totaling 321 matches with 35 goals in the competition.

== International career ==
Bătrânu played eight matches for Romania, making his debut on 8 February 1995 under coach Anghel Iordănescu in a 1–0 friendly loss to Greece. He later featured in a 7–0 victory over Liechtenstein and a goalless draw against Slovakia during the Euro 2000 qualifiers. His last appearance for the national team took place on 4 February 2000 in a 1–1 draw against Georgia in the 2000 Cyprus International Tournament.

== Managerial career ==
In 2008, Bătrânu led Romania's national homeless team during the Homeless World Cup. In November of that year, he was hired to co-coach Liga II club CFR Timișoara alongside Dan Potocianu. During the second half of the 2020–21 Liga III season, he was the head coach of Dumbrăvița, finishing in third place. Subsequently, he worked at Dumbrăvița's youth center and was the assistant to Cristian Dulca for the Romania women's national team. In May 2025, Bătrânu was hired to join the technical staff of CS Giroc-Chișoda, before moving in October of that year to work as chief scout for ASU Politehnica Timișoara.

== International stats ==
Appearances and goals by national team and year
National team	Year	Apps	Goals
Romania
Romania	1995	1	0
Romania	1996	0	0
Romania	1997	0	0
Romania	1998	3	0
Romania	1999	2	0
Romania	2000	2	0
Total		8	0

== Honours ==
Politehnica Timișoara

- Cupa României runner-up: 1991–92

Universitatea Craiova

- Cupa României runner-up: 1999–2000

BFC Dynamo

- NOFV-Oberliga: 2000–01
