= Constantin Gâlcă =

Romanian footballer (born 1972)

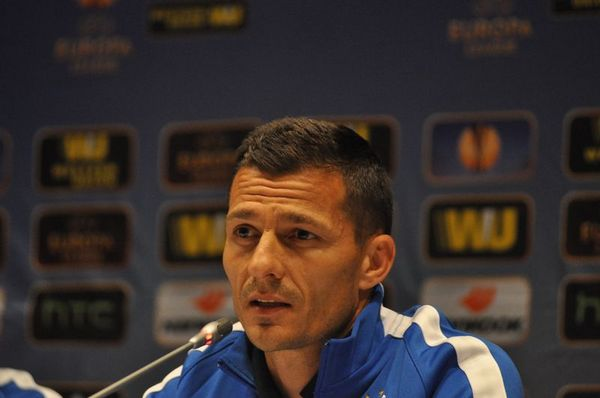
- Gâlcă during a press conference in 2014

Personal information
- Full name: Constantin Gâlcă
- Date of birth: 8 March 1972 (age 54)
- Place of birth: Bucharest, Romania
- Height: 1.78 m (5 ft 10 in)
- Position: Midfielder

Youth career
- –1988: Progresul București

Senior career*
Years	Team	Apps	(Gls)
1988–1989	Progresul București		
1989–1991	Argeș Pitești	35	(2)
1991–1996	Steaua București	148	(24)
1996–1997	Mallorca	36	(13)
1997–2001	Espanyol	123	(15)
2001–2003	Villarreal	39	(1)
2002–2003	→ Zaragoza (loan)	24	(0)
2003–2006	Almería	98	(4)
Total		502	(59)

International career
1991–1993	Romania U21	7	(1)
1993–2005	Romania	68	(4)

Managerial career
- 2009–2010: Almería B
- 2013–2014: Romania U17
- 2014–2015: Steaua București
- 2015–2016: Espanyol
- 2016–2017: Al-Taawoun
- 2017: Al-Fayha
- 2019–2021: Vejle
- 2021–2022: Al-Hazem
- 2023: Radomiak Radom
- 2024–2025: Universitatea Craiova
- 2025–2026: Rapid București
- * Club domestic league appearances and goals

Constantin "Costel" Gâlcă (born 8 March 1972) is a Romanian professional football manager and former player.

Equally at ease as a defensive or central midfielder and possessing an accurate long-range shot, he first made a name for himself at Steaua București. He then spent a full decade in Spain, playing in 318 matches in both major levels combined and representing five clubs, most notably Espanyol.

Additionally, Gâlcă appeared for Romania in two World Cups and as many European Championships, winning 68 caps. As a manager, he led teams including both Steaua and Espanyol.

== Club career ==
Born in Bucharest, Gâlcă's senior career began at age 16 in the third division, with FC Progresul București. Only one year after he switched to the Divizia A with FC Argeș Pitești, for whom he played four times towards the end of the season, soon breaking into the Romanian national under-21 team.

After one more season with solid displays (31 games, two goals), Gâlcă signed with country giants Steaua București, immediately beginning to produce: in his debut campaign, he scored five times in 26 matches.

Gâlcă stayed at Steaua two more years, netting 13 goals combined. After winning the domestic cup and having appeared in nearly 200 official matches, he left for Spain where he would remain the next 11 years. First stop was RCD Mallorca in the Balearic Islands, for which he scored 13 times to help to a promotion to La Liga (that total was tied for squad best). He then experienced a steady period with Barcelona-based RCD Espanyol, scoring five goals in his third season, which also ended with conquest of the Copa del Rey.

In July 2001, Gâlcă signed for Villarreal CF on a three-year deal with the option of one more. Midway through his second year he was loaned to Segunda División club Real Zaragoza; the team had an option to sign him if they won promotion, but did not transfer him despite the achievement.

Gâlcă still had three more solid seasons in the country with second-tier club UD Almería, playing 40 matches in his last season, one year before the Andalusians first reached the top division. He eventually returned to the national team with this team in 2005 – after a three-year absence – and retired in June 2006 at the age of 34.

== International career ==
Galca made his full debut for Romania on 22 September 1993, against Israel in a friendly. Called up for the 1994 FIFA World Cup he played three times during the tournament, against the United States in the group stage, in the famous 3–2 round-of-16 success against Argentina and in the penalty shootout defeat to Sweden in the last-eight.

From 1996 to 2000, Gâlcă featured in over forty more international games for Romania, often pairing with Dorinel Munteanu in central midfield. During the qualifying phase for the 1998 World Cup the national side were undefeated in their ten group fixtures, drawing only once and netting 37 goals, with him scoring two. In those finals and UEFA Euro 2000 the country was beaten, respectively, in the last-16 and last-eight, as he started in every match.

== Coaching career ==
Established in Almería after his playing days, Gâlcă took up coaching in 2009–10, starting with Almería's B-team in the fourth tier. He was sacked on 19 January 2010, after a string of poor results.

On 20 August 2013, Gâlcă was named head coach of Romania under-17s. He ended his contract in June 2014 and, also in that month, was appointed at league champions Steaua București on a two-year deal, replacing outgoing Laurențiu Reghecampf and leading the team to the double in his first and only season.

On 14 December 2015, Gâlcă replaced former club teammate Sergio at the helm of Espanyol. His first game in charge took place the following day, a 2–1 home win against Levante UD for the Copa del Rey (3–2 on aggregate). The following 27 May, having led the Periquitos to 13th, his contract was not renewed.

Gâlcă was hired by Saudi Professional League club Al-Taawoun on 19 October 2016. For the following season, he moved to Al-Fayha in the same league. Having won once in nine games and with the club in the relegation zone, he was dismissed on 7 November 2017.

On 6 March 2019, Gâlcă returned to European football with Vejle Boldklub, last-placed in the Danish Superliga. His team won the second tier in the 2019–20 season, and survived on return to the top flight; he resigned in May 2021 due to disagreements with the board.

Gâlcă returned to the Saudi top league on 10 December 2021, joining Al-Hazem after the dismissal of Hélder. He left the club by mutual consent on 21 February 2022.

On 16 April 2023, Gâlcă was appointed manager of Polish Ekstraklasa side Radomiak Radom, replacing Mariusz Lewandowski. His stint started off well, with three wins and one draw in five league games. However, as the 2023–24 season started and progressed, he became vocal about his disappointment in the board's decisions regarding transfer activity and lack of youth players to fulfill their mandatory playing time quota. On 27 November 2023, 86 minutes before Radomiak's home game against Śląsk Wrocław, it was announced Gâlcă left the club by mutual consent.

On 17 April 2024, he was revealed as the new manager of Romanian top tier side Universitatea Craiova, signing on until the end of the 2024–25 season, with an extension option. He was sacked by the club on 27 January 2025 after a 1–0 away loss to Rapid București.

On 3 June 2025, Gâlcă was appointed manager of Romanian Liga I club Rapid București, signing a two-year contract.

== Playing statistics ==
Appearances and goals by national team and year
National team	Year	Apps	Goals
Romania	1993	1	0
Romania	1994	9	0
Romania	1995	3	0
Romania	1996	9	2
Romania	1997	7	2
Romania	1998	14	0
Romania	1999	10	0
Romania	2000	8	0
Romania	2001	4	0
Romania	2002	1	0
Romania	2003	0	0
Romania	2004	0	0
Romania	2005	2	0
Total		68	4

Scores and results list Romania's goal tally first, score column indicates score after each Gâlcă goal.

Goal	Date	Venue	Opponent	Score	Result	Competition
1.	24 April 1996	Stadionul Steaua, Bucharest, Romania	Georgia	5–0	5–0	Friendly
2.	31 August 1996	Stadionul Steaua, Bucharest, Romania	Lithuania	3–0	3–0	1998 FIFA World Cup qualification
3.	20 August 1997	Stadionul Steaua, Bucharest, Romania	Macedonia	2–0	4–2	1998 FIFA World Cup qualification
4.	10 September 1997	Stadionul Steaua, Bucharest, Romania	Iceland	3–0	4–0	1998 FIFA World Cup qualification

== Managerial statistics ==
As of 25 May 2026

Managerial record by team and tenure
Team	From	To	Record							
Team	From	To	G	W	D	L	GF	GA	GD	Win %
Almería B	1 July 2009	19 January 2010	22	11	5	6	33	21	+12	50.00
Romania U17	20 August 2013	1 June 2014	13	5	5	3	17	10	+7	38.46
Steaua București	1 June 2014	1 June 2015	58	37	8	13	110	53	+57	63.79
Espanyol	14 December 2015	1 June 2016	26	8	5	13	28	55	−27	30.77
Al-Taawoun	16 October 2016	20 March 2017	21	10	3	8	23	24	−1	47.62
Al-Fayha	20 May 2017	7 November 2017	18	3	7	8	3	7	−4	16.67
Vejle Boldklub	6 March 2019	30 June 2021	82	36	23	23	139	107	+32	43.90
Al-Hazem	6 December 2021	21 February 2022	9	1	0	8	6	11	−5	11.11
Radomiak Radom	16 April 2023	27 November 2023	22	8	5	9	26	29	−3	36.36
Universitatea Craiova	17 April 2024	28 January 2025	35	16	11	8	55	37	+18	45.71
Rapid București	3 June 2025	27 May 2026	43	18	12	13	61	48	+13	41.86
Total			349	153	84	112	501	401	+100	43.84

== Honours ==
=== Player ===
Steaua București

- Divizia A: 1992–93, 1993–94, 1994–95, 1995–96
- Cupa României: 1991–92, 1995–96
- Supercupa României: 1994, 1995

Espanyol

- Copa Catalunya: 1998–99
- Copa del Rey: 1999–00
- Supercopa de España runner-up: 2000

=== Coach ===
Steaua București

- Liga I: 2014–15
- Cupa României: 2014–15
- Cupa Ligii: 2014–15
- Supercupa României runner-up: 2014

Vejle

- Danish 1st Division: 2019–20
