= Marian Popa =

Romanian footballer

Personal information
- Date of birth: 3 March 1964
- Place of birth: Constanța, Romania
- Height: 1.85 m (6 ft 1 in)
- Position: Striker

Youth career
- 1975–1982: FC Constanța

Senior career*
Years	Team	Apps	(Gls)
1982–1983	Voința Constanța		
1983–1987	Metalul Mangalia		
1987–1990	Farul Constanța	80	(29)
1990–1992	Steaua București	49	(20)
1992–1994	Farul Constanța	28	(18)
1994–1995	Steaua București	14	(7)
1995	Farul Constanța	1	(0)
1996	FC Brașov	17	(5)
1996	Budapesti VSC	5	(0)
1997	Săgeata Stejaru		
Total		194	(79)

International career
1990–1993	Romania	2	(0)
- * Club domestic league appearances and goals

Marian Popa (born 3 March 1964) is a Romanian former football striker.

== Club career ==
"Marian Popa was a strong box striker, he protected the ball well, was opportunistic. Good football player. As a man, I have always found him a special character."

— Ilie Stan, former Steaua teammate

Popa was born on 3 March 1964 in Constanța, Romania and began playing junior-level football at age 11 for FC Constanța under coach Adam Munteanu, and later worked with Constantin Tâlvescu. In 1982, he started his senior career at Divizia C club Voința Constanța and after one year he moved to Metalul Mangalia. In 1987 he joined Farul Constanța in Divizia B where he was coached by Emanoil Hașoti, scoring six goals in his first season that helped the club earn promotion to Divizia A. Subsequently, he made his debut in the competition on 21 August 1988 in a 3–0 home win over ASA Târgu Mureș. In the 1989–90 season, Popa scored a personal record of 15 goals which placed him second in the top-scorer of the season ranking, four goals fewer than Steaua București's Gabi Balint. Afterwards Farul sent him to Steaua București in exchange for Gheorghe Butoiu and Ioan Tătăran. There, he started to play in European competitions, making his debut in a 5–0 away loss to Montpellier in the 1990–91 European Cup Winners' Cup second round in which he received a red card. In the following season he played six games in the 1991–92 UEFA Cup campaign, helping the team get past Anorthosis Famagusta and Sporting Gijón, scoring two goals against the latter, reaching the round of 16 where they were defeated by Genoa. In the same season he won the Cupa României, being used by coach Victor Pițurcă in the first 54 minutes until he was replaced by Ion Vlădoiu in the penalty shoot-out victory against Politehnica Timișoara in the final.

In 1992, Popa was close to a move to La Liga team Logroñés, but eventually went back to Farul. He scored 14 times in 18 matches in the 1992–93 season which helped The Sailors avoid relegation, including six goals netted in a 6–3 victory against Oțelul Galați. He made a comeback to Steaua, managing to win the 1994 Supercupa României as coach Dumitru Dumitriu sent him in the second half to replace Adrian Ilie, then he scored the golden goal in extra time which brought the victory against Gloria Bistrița. During the 1994–95 season, Popa scored seven goals in the 14 league games Dumitriu used him as Steaua won the title. In the same season he made four appearances in the Champions League campaign of which three were in the group stage. Popa would go for another spell at Farul, then he joined FC Brașov where on 7 September 1996 he made his last Divizia A appearance in a 2–1 away loss to Chindia Târgoviște, totaling 168 matches with 73 goals in the competition.

In 1996 he had his only experience outside Romania at Hungarian side Budapesti VSC. He made his Nemzeti Bajnokság I on 20 October as coach László Dajka used him in the first half of a 3–1 home win over Győr, replacing him for the second half with his compatriot Constantin Stănici. His fifth and last Nemzeti Bajnokság I game took place on 30 November in a 1–0 home loss to Vác, retiring afterwards from professional football. Subsequently, Popa would play for a short while at Săgeata Stejaru, helping the club gain promotion from Divizia D to Divizia C.

== International career ==
Popa played two friendly games for Romania, making his debut on 25 April 1990 when coach Emerich Jenei sent him in the 81st minute to replace Michael Klein in a 4–1 away win over Israel. His second game was also a win against Israel, a 1–0 at home.

== After retirement ==
After he ended his playing career, Popa had several businesses and coached juniors at Farul Constanța and Metalul Mangalia, and the Municipal Constanța futsal team. For a while he was president of Portul Constanța.

== Honours ==
Metalul Mangalia

- Divizia B: 1983–84

Farul Constanța

- Divizia B: 1987–88

Steaua București

- Divizia A: 1994–95
- Cupa României: 1991–92
- Supercupa României: 1994

Săgeata Stejaru

- Divizia D: 1996–97
