= Adrian Stoicov =

Romanian former footballer

Personal information
- Date of birth: 12 November 1967
- Place of birth: Deta, Romania
- Date of death: 15 March 2017 (aged 49)
- Place of death: Timișoara, Romania
- Height: 1.78 m (5 ft 10 in)
- Position: Left-back

Youth career
- ȘS Timișoara
- Politehnica Timișoara

Senior career*
Years	Team	Apps	(Gls)
1986–1987	Obilici Sânmartinu-Sârbesc		
1987–1993	Politehnica Timișoara (Note: The statistics for the 1988–89 Divizia B season are unavailable.)	127	(2)
1993–1994	Progresul București	28	(0)
1994–1995	Politehnica Timișoara	33	(0)
1995	CFR Timișoara	1	(0)
1995–1998	Politehnica Timișoara	86	(1)
1998	UM Timișoara		
1999–2000	Inter Sibiu	23	(0)
2000–2001	Cetate Deva	32	(0)
Total		330	(3)

International career
1992	Romania B	2	(0)
- * Club domestic league appearances and goals

Adrian Stoicov (12 November 1967 – 15 March 2017) was a Romanian footballer who played as a left-back.

== Club career ==
Stoicov, nicknamed "Bulgarul" (The Bulgarian), was born on 12 November 1967 in Deta, Romania and began playing junior-level football at ȘS Timișoara before moving to Politehnica Timișoara. He started his senior career in 1986 at Divizia C club Obilici Sânmartinu-Sârbesc.

In 1987, Stoicov returned to Politehnica, making his Divizia A debut on 29 November under coach Ion Ionescu in a 1–0 home win over Universitatea Cluj. At the end of his first season, Politehnica was relegated, but he stayed with the club, helping it get promoted back after one year. Subsequently, in the 1990–91 UEFA Cup coach Constantin Rădulescu used him in four matches, as in the first round they got past Atlético Madrid with 2–1 on aggregate, being eliminated in the next round by Sporting Lisbon. He helped the club reach the 1992 Cupa României final, coach Ion Ionescu using him the entire match in the loss at the penalty shoot-out to Steaua București, Stoicov missing one of Politehnica's spot kicks. He then participated in the 1992–93 UEFA Cup edition where in the first round they faced Real Madrid, obtaining a 1–1 draw at Timișoara and losing with 4–0 at Santiago Bernabéu.

Stoicov left Politehnica to join Progresul București for the 1993–94 season. He then returned to Politehnica for the 1994–95 Divizia B season, helping them gain promotion to the first league. He began the next season in Divizia B, playing one game for CFR Timișoara. Afterwards, he moved to the first league to play for Politehnica, which was relegated once again at the end of the 1996–97 season. After one more season spent in Divizia B with The White-Purples, Stoicov went to third league team UM Timișoara for the first half of the 1998–99 season. He joined Inter Sibiu for the second half, UM managing to gain promotion to the second league without him. He continued to play at Divizia B level at Sibiu and Cetate Deva until he ended his career in 2001. Stoicov has a total of 217 appearances with three goals scored in Divizia A.

== International career ==
Stoicov played two games in 1992 for Romania's B squad, a victory against China and a loss to Poland.

== Coaching career ==
After he ended his playing career, Stoicov worked as an assistant and youth coach.

== Death ==
He died on 15 March 2017 at age 49 in Timișoara after suffering from lung cancer.

== Honours ==
Politehnica Timișoara

- Divizia B: 1988–89, 1994–95
- Cupa României runner-up: 1991–92

UM Timișoara

- Divizia C: 1998–99
