= Sorin Vlaicu =

Romanian footballer

Personal information
- Date of birth: 3 June 1965 (age 61)
- Place of birth: Șimian, Romania
- Height: 1.70 m (5 ft 7 in)
- Position: Midfielder

Team information
- Current team: Politehnica Timișoara (youth coach)

Youth career
- 1979–1982: Mecanizatorul Șimian

Senior career*
Years	Team	Apps	(Gls)
1982–1984	Mecanizatorul Șimian		
1985–1986	Armata Craiova		
1986–1987	UM Timișoara		
1987–1992	Politehnica Timișoara	122	(14)
1992–1993	Red Star Belgrade	13	(0)
1993–1995	Politehnica Timișoara	71	(7)
1995–1996	Békéscsaba	14	(2)
1996–1999	Politehnica Timișoara	95	(8)
1999–2000	Drobeta-Turnu Severin	37	(10)
2000–2002	UM Timișoara	63	(7)
2003	CFR Timișoara		
Total		415	(48)

International career
1991–1992	Romania	4	(0)

Managerial career
- 2005–2006: Timișul Albina
- 2014–2015: ACS Poli Timișoara (assistant)
Medal record
Politehnica Timișoara
Runner-up	Romanian Cup	1992
- * Club domestic league appearances and goals

Sorin Vlaicu (born 3 June 1965) is a retired Romanian international footballer.

== Club career ==
Vlaicu was born on 3 June 1965 in Șimian, Romania and began playing junior-level football in 1979, aged 14 at local club Mecanizatorul. He started his senior career at Mecanizatorul, going afterwards to Armata Craiova, and then in 1986 to Divizia C club UM Timișoara.

In 1987, Vlaicu signed with Politehnica Timișoara where coach Ion Ionescu gave him his Divizia A debut on 14 May 1988 in a 6–0 away loss to Dinamo București. At the end of his first season, the team was relegated to Divizia B, but he stayed with the club, helping it get promoted back after one year, contributing with four goals scored, including one in a 3–1 West derby victory against UTA Arad. He played four matches in the 1990–91 UEFA Cup edition under coach Constantin Rădulescu, as in the first round they got past Atlético Madrid with 2–1 on aggregate, being eliminated in the next round by Sporting Lisbon against whom he scored once. Subsequently, the club reached the 1992 Cupa României final, where coach Ionescu used him the entire match in the loss at the penalty shoot-out to Steaua București, Vlaicu missing his spot kick.

Vlaicu was transferred in 1992 by the 1991 European Champions Red Star Belgrade. He left the Yugoslavs after only half a season to return to Politehnica, but they still managed to win the Yugoslavia Cup without him. The White-Purples were relegated at the end of the 1993–94 season, Vlaicu spending one more year with them in Divizia B. In 1995 he moved to Hungary to play for Békéscsaba, making his Nemzeti Bajnokság I debut on 10 May under coach József Pásztor in a 0–0 draw against Újpest. Five days later, Vlaicu scored his first goal in a 2–2 draw against Győr. He made his last Nemzeti Bajnokság I on 23 June 1996 in a 3–1 home win over Győr, having a total of 14 games with two goals scored in the competition. Subsequently, he made a third comeback at Politehnica. In the 1996–97 season the club was relegated once again to the second division, where Vlaicu spent another one and a half years.

In 1999 he signed a contract with Drobeta-Turnu Severin in Divizia B. In April 2000, together with 16 other players, Vlaicu accused the board of inducing the players to lose a match against Chimica Târnăveni. After examining the case, the Romanian Football Federation punished the clubs with mutual walkovers for both league matches and deducted six points from Drobeta-Turnu Severin. He then moved to UM Timișoara, managing to earn promotion to the first league in the 2000–01 season. Vlaicu made his last Divizia A appearance on 1 June 2002 in UM's 1–0 home loss to Ceahlăul Piatra Neamț, totaling 214 matches with 19 goals in the competition. He ended his career one year later, playing with UM and CFR Timișoara in the Romanian lower leagues.

== International career ==
Vlaicu played four friendly games for Romania, making his debut on 17 April 1991 when coach Mircea Rădulescu sent him to replace captain Gheorghe Hagi in the 61st minute of a 2–0 away victory against Spain. He made his last appearance for the national team on 8 April 1992 in a 2–0 home win over Latvia.

== Managerial career ==
Vlaicu coached Timișul Albina during the 2005–06 Divizia D season, at the end of which the team earned promotion to Divizia C. In March 2014 he was brought by Dan Alexa to be his assistant at ACS Poli Timișoara. He also coached juniors.

== Honours ==
=== Player ===
Politehnica Timișoara

- Divizia B: 1988–89
- Cupa României runner-up: 1991–92

Red Star Belgrade

- FR Yugoslav Cup: 1992–93

UM Timișoara

- Divizia B: 2000–01

=== Manager ===
Timișul Albina

- Divizia D: 2005–06

== External sources ==
- Sorin Vlaicu at WorldFootball.net
