= Vlaicu =

Vlaicu is a Romanian surname. Notable people with the surname include:

- Aurel Vlaicu (1882–1913), Romanian engineer, inventor and aviator
- Florin Vlaicu (born 1986), Romanian rugby union player
- Sorin Vlaicu (born 1965), Romanian footballer

As a given name, it may refer to:

- Vlaicu Bârna (1913–1999), poet
