= 1994 Supercupa României =

Supercupa României 1994
- Event: Supercupa României 1994
Steaua București	Gloria Bistrița
Divizia A	Cupa României
1	0
- Date: 20 August 1994
- Venue: Stadionul Național, București
- Referee: Ion Crăciunescu (Râmnicu Vâlcea)
- Attendance: 5.000

The 1994 Supercupa României was the first edition of Romania's season opener cup competition. The match was played in Bucharest at Stadionul Național on 20 August 1994, and was contested between Divizia A title holders, Steaua București and Cupa României champions, Gloria Bistrița. Steaua București became the first winner of the trophy after a goal scored by Marian Popa in extra time.

== Match ==
20 August 1994
18:00

Steaua București	1–0	Gloria Bistrița
Marian Popa 108'	(Report)

Stadionul Național
Attendance: 5.000
Referee: Ion Crăciunescu (Râmnicu Vâlcea)

Steaua București	Gloria Bistrița

STEAUA BUCUREȘTI:
P	1	(Romania) Dumitru Stângaciu
FD	2	(Romania) Aurel Panait	(substituted off) 68'
FC	6	(Romania) Daniel Prodan
FC	4	(Romania) Anton Doboș
MS	11	(Romania) Ilie Stan
MC	3	(Romania) Ionel Pârvu
MD	5	(Romania) Constantin Gâlcă
MO	10	(Romania) Basarab Panduru
MO	8	(Romania) Damian Militaru
A	7	(Romania) Marius Lăcătuș
A	9	(Romania) Adrian Ilie		(substituted off) 83'
Substitutes:
A	––	(Romania) Laurențiu Roșu		(substituted in) 68'
A	––	(Romania) Marian Popa		(substituted in) 83'	108'	Booked
Coach:
(Romania) Dumitru Dumitriu

GLORIA BISTRIȚA:
P	1	(Romania) Costel Câmpeanu
FS	2	(Romania) Dorel Zegrean	Booked
F	3	(Romania) Valer Săsărman
F	6	(Romania) Simion Mironaș
FD	7	(Romania) Cornel Sevastița
M	5	(Romania) Mihai Tararache
M	4	(Romania) Gabriel Cristea
M	8	(Romania) Marius Răduță
A	10	(Romania) Florin Stancu	Booked
A	9	(Romania) Ilie Lazăr
A	11	(Romania) Dănuț Matei
Substitutes:
Coach:
(Romania) Constantin Cârstea

MATCH OFFICIALS

- Assistant referees:
  - Ilie Coț (Ploiești)
  - Nicolae Grigorescu (Timișoara)
- Fourth official:

MAN OF THE MATCH

MATCH RULES

- 90 minutes.
- 30 minute de prelungire (două reprize de 15 minute)
- 30 minutes extra-time (15 minute intervals)
- Penalty shoot-out if scores level after extra time.
- Seven named substitutes
- Maximum of three substitutions.

== See also ==
- 1994–95 Divizia A
- 1994–95 Cupa României
