= Gheorghe Butoiu =

Romanian footballer (born 1968)

Personal information
- Date of birth: 7 November 1968 (age 58)
- Place of birth: Câmpulung Muscel, Romania
- Height: 1.69 m (5 ft 7 in)
- Position: Attacking midfielder

Youth career
- –1983: ARO Muscelul Câmpulung
- 1986–1988: Steaua București

Senior career*
| Years | Team | Apps | (Gls) |
| 1983–1986 | ARO Muscelul Câmpulung | | |
| 1988–1989 | Steaua Mizil | | |
| 1989–1996 | Farul Constanța | 161 | (39) |
| 1996 | Standard Liège | 13 | (2) |
| 1996–1998 | Rapid București | 39 | (7) |
| 1998 | Farul Constanța | 10 | (1) |
| 1998–1999 | Național București | 31 | (4) |
| 1999–2001 | Farul Constanța | 28 | (2) |
| 2001 | ARO Muscelul Câmpulung | 15 | (1) |
| Total | | 297 | (56) |

International career
| 1995 | Romania B | 1 | (1) |

Managerial career
- 2008–2009: CS Eforie
- 2009: Farul Constanța (assistant)
- 2009: Farul Constanța
- 2010: Farul II Constanța
- 2010: Farul Constanța
- 2010–2011: Farul Constanța (assistant)
- 2011: Farul Constanța
- 2012: Eolica Dobrogea
- 2013: Săgeata Năvodari
- 2013: Săgeata Năvodari (assistant)
- 2013: Săgeata Năvodari (caretaker)
- 2013–2014: Săgeata Năvodari (assistant)
- 2014: Săgeata Năvodari
- * Club domestic league appearances and goals

Gheorghe Butoiu (born 7 November 1968) is a Romanian former football player and manager.

== Club career ==
Butoiu was born on 7 November 1968 in Câmpulung Muscel and began playing junior-level football when he was aged 12 at local club ARO Muscelul Câmpulung. In 1983, at age 16, he started to play for the team's senior squad in Divizia C. In 1986, he was brought to play at Steaua București's youth center, after being seen by Nicolae Pantea. Butoiu worked at The Military Men with coaches Bujor Hălmăgeanu and Lajos Sătmăreanu. In 1988, Butoiu was sent to play for Steaua Mizil in Divizia B, where in his single season he was one of the team's top-scorers. Afterwards, Steaua București sent him and Ioan Tătăran to Farul Constanța in exchange for Marian Popa. At Farul, he made his Divizia A debut on 25 October 1989 under coach Gheorghe Constantin in a 0–0 draw against Sportul Studențesc București. He spent six and a half seasons with The Sailors, and in the first half of the 1995–96 season he scored a personal record of 12 goals. That performance impressed Standard Liège's assistant coach Léon Semmeling who came to Romania to see him play, including witnessing a 7–0 victory against Politehnica Iași in which Butoiu netted a double, afterwards recommending him to Les Rouches. At Standard he was teammates with compatriot Mircea Rednic, but he spent only half a year with the club, being used by head coach Robert Waseige in 13 games, scoring two victory goals against Cercle Brugge and Mechelen. Butoiu returned to Romania, signing with Rapid București where he worked with coaches Mircea Rădulescu, Ion Dumitru, Nicolae Manea and Mircea Lucescu. He also played with The Railway Men four games in the 1996–97 UEFA Cup, scoring one goal from about 40 meters in a 1–0 victory against Lokomotiv Sofia which helped the team advance to the next phase of the competition where they were eliminated by Karlsruhe. After his Rapid spell ended, Butoiu went to play again for a short while at Farul where he was wanted by coach Ioan Andone. Then he went to play for one season at Național București where he was requested by his former coach from Farul, Florin Marin, having a successful spell with The Bankers, during which he was also coached by José Ramón Alexanko and Gino Iorgulescu. In the 1999–2000 season he started his third spell at Farul which was unsuccessful as in the second half of the season coach Vasile Simionaș did not use him much and the team was relegated to Divizia B. Butoiu stayed with The Sailors in Divizia B for a half of season, working with coach Petre Grigoraș. For the second part of the season, he retired in his hometown, returning to the club where he began his football career, ARO Muscelul Câmpulung under the guidance of coach Ionel Augustin. Butoiu has a total of 259 appearances with 53 goals in Divizia A.

== International career ==
Butoiu was used by coach Anghel Iordănescu on 27 September 1995 in one game for Romania's B team at Belo Horizonte against the equivalent team of Brazil who had players Sávio and Zé Roberto among others. Butoiu managed to score the final goal of the 2–2 draw against goalkeeper Dida.

== Coaching career ==
Butoiu started coaching at Farul Constanța's youth center, managing in 2008 to win the national junior championship for the first time after 45 years with the help of players such as Denis Alibec, Cosmin Matei and Kehinde Fatai. Shortly after that performance, he started coaching seniors, first, CS Eforie in Liga III. In the beginning of the 2009–10 Liga II he returned to Farul as Marius Șumudică's assistant, becoming head coach for 18 games after Șumudică's departure. He started the year 2010 as head coach of Farul's satellite team in Liga III. However, after only five rounds in the second half of the season, Ștefan Stoica was dismissed after obtaining only four points and Butoiu had to return to coach the first team alongside technical director Dennis Șerban. For the following season, The Sailors named Ioan Sdrobiș as head coach, but Butoiu remained in the coaching staff as an assistant until January 2011 when Sdrobiș left the club and Butoiu became again head coach for a few months. In 2012 he led Eolica Dobrogea in Liga III together with Mihai Guliu and at the beginning of 2013 they went in Liga II to coach Săgeata Năvodari which they helped gain promotion in Liga I for the first time in history. In the following season he remained in Săgeata's technical staff as an assistant of Tibor Selymes. In December 2013 he had his first spell as head coach in Liga I, as after the dismissal of Selymes he was appointed as caretaker for the last two rounds of the year, obtaining in his first match the team's first away victory of the season, a 2–1 win against Gaz Metan Mediaș. Afterwards Butoiu continued to work in Săgeata's new coaching staff led by Cătălin Anghel, but the team was relegated back to the second league by the end of the season. In November 2014 after Anghel left the team, Butoiu led the team again for a short while as head coach.
