= Ion Vlădoiu =

Romanian footballer

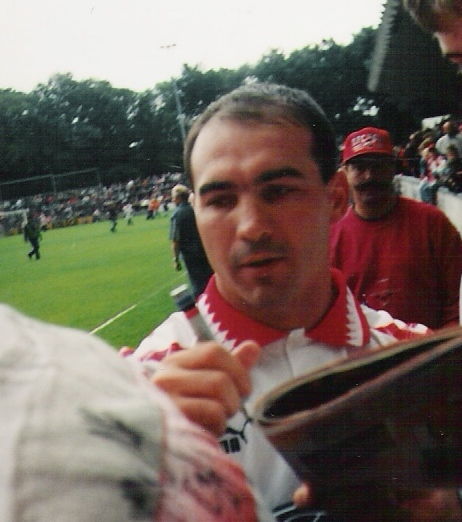
- Vlădoiu in 1996

Personal information
- Date of birth: 5 November 1968 (age 57)
- Place of birth: Călinești, Romania
- Height: 1.68 m (5 ft 6 in)
- Position: Striker

Youth career
- –1987: CSȘ Aripi Pitești

Senior career*
Years	Team	Apps	(Gls)
1987–1990	Argeș Pitești	75	(13)
1991–1993	Steaua București	77	(24)
1994–1995	Rapid București	43	(22)
1995–1996	Steaua București	33	(25)
1996–1998	1. FC Köln	51	(10)
1998–1999	Dinamo București	36	(26)
2000	Kickers Offenbach	15	(5)
2000–2001	Steaua București	15	(10)
2002	Argeș Pitești	16	(8)
2002	Universitatea Craiova	13	(2)
2003	Argeș Pitești	16	(0)
2004	UTA Arad	3	(1)
Total		393	(146)

International career
1992–2000	Romania	28	(2)

Managerial career
- 2006: FC Snagov
- 2006: Național București
- 2008–2009: Dinamo București (assistant)
- 2010: Argeș Pitești
- 2020–2022: Argeș Pitești (general manager)
- 2025–2026: Unirea Slobozia (assistant)
- * Club domestic league appearances and goals

Ion "Jean" Vlădoiu (born 5 November 1968) is a Romanian former professional footballer who played as a striker.

He is one of the few who played for the biggest teams of Romania – Steaua București, Rapid București, Dinamo București, Universitatea Craiova, Argeș Pitești and UTA Arad. Internationally, he played for Romania at the 1994 World Cup and Euro 1996.

== Club career ==
=== Early career ===
Vlădoiu was born on 5 November 1968 in Călinești, Romania and began playing junior-level football at CSȘ Aripi Pitești. He started his senior career at Argeș Pitești, making his Divizia A debut on 31 October 1987 under coach Florin Halagian in a 2–0 win over Oțelul Galați. Argeș reached the 1987–88 Balkans Cup final, where he played in the second leg of the 6–1 aggregate loss to Slavia Sofia.

=== Steaua București ===
In the middle of the 1990–91 season, Vlădoiu left Argeș to join Steaua București. He made four appearances in the 1991–92 UEFA Cup campaign, helping the team past Anorthosis Famagusta and Sporting Gijón—scoring twice against the latter—on their way to the round of 16, where they were defeated by Genoa. He won his first trophy, following a penalty shoot-out against Politehnica Timișoara in the 1992 Cupa României final with Vlădoiu netting his spot kick, as coach Victor Pițurcă sent him in the 54th minute to replace Marian Popa.

In the following season, he scored 10 times in the 29 league matches coach Anghel Iordănescu used him as Steaua won the title. That same season, Vlădoiu made six appearances in the European Cup Winners' Cup. He helped the team advance past Bohemians and Aarhus—scoring once against the former and twice against the latter—before they were eliminated in the quarter-finals by Royal Antwerp on the away goal rule after a 1–1 aggregate draw.

Afterwards, he participated with The Military Men in the 1993–94 Champions League and scored a double which helped them get past Croatia Zagreb in the first round, though the team was eliminated in the following round by AS Monaco. In the first half of the 1993–94 Divizia A season, Vlădoiu was used by coach Emerich Jenei in 14 games in which he netted one goal in a 3–0 away win over rivals Dinamo București. However, he left in the middle of the season to go to Rapid București, but Steaua managed to win the championship without him.

=== Rapid București ===
Vlădoiu reached the 1995 Cupa României final with Rapid and successfully converted his penalty kick during the shoot-out loss to Petrolul Ploiești, as coach Sorin Cârțu kept him on the pitch for the entire match. He participated with The Railwaymen in the 1994–95 UEFA Cup, scoring a brace as they got past Valletta in the qualifying round, then he netted a goal which helped them eliminate Charleroi in the first round, being defeated in the following round by Eintracht Frankfurt.

=== Return to Steaua ===
In 1995, Vlădoiu returned to Steaua, and his first performance was the winning of the Supercupa României in which he closed the score in the 2–0 win over Petrolul Ploiești. In the 1995–96 season, under coach Dumitru Dumitriu he netted a personal record of 25 goals, including a hat-trick in a 4–2 victory against Dinamo, winning the championship and being its top-scorer. Dumitriu also used him the full 90 minutes in the 3–1 win over Gloria Bistrița in the 1996 Cupa României final. In the same season he played six games in the Champions League group stage, receiving a red card in a 0–0 draw against Juventus.

=== 1. FC Köln ===
In 1996, Vlădoiu was transferred for a fee of 1.5 million deutschmarks to German side 1. FC Köln where he was partner in the offence with Toni Polster, and had compatriot Dorinel Munteanu as a teammate. In a few days following his transfer, the club sold 18,000 t-shirts with his name on them. Vlădoiu made his Bundesliga debut on 18 August 1996 under coach Peter Neururer in a 3–0 away victory against Fortuna Düsseldorf. He scored his first goal in the following round on 21 August in a 1–0 win over TSV 1860 Munich. Until the end of the season he netted a total of eight goals, including a brace in a 3–1 home victory against Schalke 04. In the following season he managed another double in a 4–2 home victory against VfB Stuttgart after two assists from Munteanu. On 9 May 1998, Vlădoiu made his last Bundesliga appearance in a 2–2 draw against Bayer Leverkusen, totaling 51 matches with 10 goals in the competition, Köln being relegated to 2. Bundesliga.

During his years spent with The Billy Goats, he also played in the Intertoto Cup, netting a hat-trick in 1995 in a 3–0 win against Aarau which helped them reach the semi-finals.

=== Dinamo București and Kickers Offenbach ===
In 1998 he returned to Romania, signing with Dinamo. During his spell with The Red Dogs, he made his last appearances in European competitions. The team got past Mondercange in the qualifying round of the 1999–2000 UEFA Cup, then got defeated 3–0 on aggregate by Benfica in the first round, Vlădoiu totaling 36 continental matches with 11 goals netted (including five games with three goals in the Intertoto Cup). In the first half of the 1999–2000 domestic season, he scored 12 goals in the 12 games coach Cornel Dinu used him. However, Vlădoiu had a hard time finding a place in the team's starting lineup, having to compete with Adrian Mutu, Marius Niculae and Adrian Mihalcea. He left in the middle of the season to go to 2. Bundesliga club Kickers Offenbach, but Dinamo managed to win The Double without him.

=== Third spell at Steaua ===
After his spell at Kickers Offenbach, Vlădoiu returned again to Steaua. He won the 2000–01 title, playing 14 games under the guidance of Victor Pițurcă, netting 10 goals, including a hat-trick in a 4–1 victory against Dinamo.

=== Late career ===
During the 2001–02 season, Vlădoiu made a comeback to Argeș Pitești. In 2003 he joined Universitatea Craiova, but shortly afterwards returned to Argeș. He made his last Divizia A appearance on 8 November 2003, playing for Argeș in a 1–0 home loss to "U" Craiova, totaling 324 matches in the competition with 130 goals. Vlădoiu ended his career by playing a few games for UTA Arad during the 2003–04 Divizia B season.

== International career ==
=== 1994 World Cup ===
Vlădoiu won 28 caps for Romania, most of them as a substitute, scoring twice. He made his debut on 14 November 1992 when coach Cornel Dinu sent him in the 67th minute to replace Ovidiu Hanganu in a 1–1 home draw against Czechoslovakia in the 1994 World Cup qualifiers. He made a total of four appearances in those successful World Cup qualifiers. Vlădoiu was part of Romania's "Golden Generation" that reached the quarter-finals in the 1994 World Cup. However, he played briefly during the final tournament when coach Anghel Iordănescu sent him in the 71st minute to replace Ilie Dumitrescu, but then he was sent off about three minutes later for a bad foul on Christophe Ohrel in a 4–1 group stage loss to Switzerland.

=== Euro 1996 ===
Afterwards he played six games during the successful Euro 1996 qualifiers. In the final tournament, the team lost all three group stage games to France, Bulgaria and Spain. Iordănescu used Vlădoiu only in the 2–1 defeat to the Spanish side when he sent him to replace goal-scorer Florin Răducioiu in the 89th minute.

=== Final years ===
In the following years, Vlădoiu played three games during the 1998 World Cup qualifiers, and scored once in a 4–0 win over Azerbaijan in the Euro 2000 qualifiers. On 3 September 2000, he made his last appearance for the national team in a 1–0 home win over Lithuania in the 2002 World Cup qualifiers.

For representing his country at two final tournaments, Vlădoiu was decorated by then President of Romania, Traian Băsescu on 25 March 2008, with the Ordinul "Meritul Sportiv" – (The Medal of "Sportive Merit") Class III.

== Managerial career ==
Vlădoiu had his first coaching experience in early 2006 at the "Străini de Fotbal" (Football Foreigners) TV show where he had to coach a group of 16 young men who had no experience with football.

He started his professional coaching career in 2006 at second league team FC Snagov. In October 2006 he went to first league side Național București which he led in four games, without securing a single victory. In the 2008–09 season he was the assistant of Mircea Rednic at Dinamo București. In 2010, Vlădoiu was appointed head coach at Argeș Pitești, but left the team about two weeks later because of the poor conditions at the club. From June 2025 to February 2026, he was an assistant for Andrei Prepeliță at Unirea Slobozia.

== Personal life ==
In 1994, Vlădoiu was named Honorary Citizen of Bucharest.

Sports commentator Ilie Dobre wrote a book about him titled Jean Vlădoiu - o stea printre stele (Jean Vlădoiu - a star among stars), which was released in 1996.

== Career statistics ==
Romania
Year	Apps	Goals
1992	2	0
1993	2	0
1994	5	0
1995	6	0
1996	7	1
1997	2	0
1998	0	0
1999	3	1
2000	1	0
Total	28	2

Scores and results list Romania's goal tally first, score column indicates score after each Vlădoiu goal.

List of international goals scored by Ion Vlădoiu
#	Date	Venue	Opponent	Score	Result	Competition
1	18 September 1996	Stadionul Cotroceni, Bucharest, Romania	United Arab Emirates	1–1	1–2	Friendly
2	9 June 1999	Stadionul Steaua, Bucharest, Romania	Azerbaijan	3–0	4–0	UEFA Euro 2000 Qual.

== Honours ==
Argeș Pitești

- Balkans Cup runner-up: 1987–88

Steaua București

- Divizia A: 1992–93, 1993–94, 1995–96, 2000–01
- Cupa României: 1991–92, 1995–96
- Supercupa României: 1995

Rapid București

- Cupa României runner-up: 1994–95

Dinamo București

- Divizia A: 1999–2000
- Cupa României: 1999–2000

Individual

- Divizia A top scorer: 1995–96 (25 goals)
