= Constantin Varga =

Romanian footballer

Personal information
- Date of birth: 18 November 1964 (age 62)
- Place of birth: Timișoara, Romania
- Position: Left back

Youth career
- 1972–1978: Politehnica Timișoara
- 1978–1982: Luceafărul București
- 1984–1985: ASA Târgu Mureș

Senior career*
Years	Team	Apps	(Gls)
1982–1983	Unirea Sânnicolau Mare		
1983–1984	Unirea Tomnatic		
1985	Bihorul Beiuș		
1986–1994	Politehnica Timișoara	271	(71)
1994	→ Győri ETO (loan)	4	(1)
1995–1996	Dinamo București	47	(3)
1996–1997	UTA Arad	25	(4)
1997–1998	UM Timișoara	30	(13)
1998–1999	Politehnica Timișoara	3	(0)
1999–2007	Minerul Moldova Nouă		
2013	ASU Politehnica Timișoara	10	(2)
Total		390	(94)

International career
1992	Romania	1	(1)
- * Club domestic league appearances and goals as of 17 January 2020

Constantin Varga (born 18 September 1964) is a Romanian former footballer who played as a defender.

== Club career ==
=== Early career ===
Varga, nicknamed "Piticul" (The Dwarf), was born on 18 September 1964 in Timișoara, Romania and began playing junior-level football at local club Politehnica under the guidance of coach Bodo Carol. At age 14, he went to Luceafărul București where he was teammates with Gheorghe Hagi and Miodrag Belodedici. He stayed at Luceafărul until he turned 18 and started his senior career at Divizia C club Unirea Sânnicolau Mare. After one year he went to Unirea Tomnatic in the same league. Another year later, Varga went to play for the youth of ASA Târgu Mureș. After about half a year spent at ASA, he joined fourth league team Bihorul Beiuș which he helped earn promotion to Divizia C.

=== Politehnica Timișoara ===
In 1986, Varga returned to Politehnica at the behest of coach Robert Cosmoc, making his Divizia A debut on 30 March in a 5–0 away loss to Universitatea Craiova. At the end of his first season, the team was relegated to Divizia B, but Varga stayed with the club, helping it get promoted back after one year. In the following season, Politehnica was relegated once again, but he helped it once more to gain promotion back to the first league by scoring 14 goals in the 1988–89 Divizia B season. In the 1990–91 UEFA Cup, coach Constantin Rădulescu used him in three matches, as in the first round they got past Atlético Madrid with 2–1 on aggregate, being eliminated in the next round by Sporting Lisbon against whom he scored once. He helped the club reach the 1992 Cupa României final, coach Ion Ionescu using him the entire match in the loss at the penalty shoot-out to Steaua București, Varga netting Politehnica's first spot kick. He then participated with the club in the 1992–93 UEFA Cup edition where in the first round they faced Real Madrid, obtaining a 1–1 draw at Timișoara and losing with 4–0 at Santiago Bernabéu. During his years spent with The White-Purples, Varga was known for his ability of scoring from free kicks, most notably scoring with a long-distance shot in a historical victory in 1987 against Dinamo București. He also scored three goals in three West derby victories against UTA Arad.

=== Győri ETO and return to Politehnica ===
In 1994, Varga had his only experience outside Romania at Hungarian team Győri ETO where he played alongside compatriot and former Politehnica teammate Lucian Popescu. He made his Nemzeti Bajnokság I on 7 May, as coach József Verebes used him in the first half of a 3–1 home win over Ferencvárosi, replacing him for the second half with Miklós Herczeg. Varga scored his only goal for Győri in a 1–1 draw against Debrecen, making his fourth and last Nemzeti Bajnokság I appearance on 28 May in a 3–0 away loss to BVSC. He then returned to Politehnica for the first half of the 1994–95 Divizia B season, leaving for the second half to join Dinamo, but Politehnica managed to gain first-league promotion without him.

=== Dinamo București ===
In his first season at Dinamo, Varga worked with coach Remus Vlad, finishing third in the league. Afterwards he played in both legs of the 2–1 aggregate loss to Levski Sofia in the preliminary round of the 1995–96 UEFA Cup. He made his last Divizia A appearance on 20 April 1996 in Dinamo's 1–1 home draw against Rapid București, totaling 238 matches with 50 goals in the competition.

=== Late career ===
In the following three seasons, Varga played in Divizia B for UTA Arad, UM Timișoara and once again Politehnica Timișoara. He continued to play in the Romanian lower leagues until his 50s, featuring for teams such as Minerul Moldova Nouă or ASU Politehnica Timișoara.

== International career ==
Varga played one friendly game for Romania on 26 August 1992 under coach Cornel Dinu in which he opened the scoring with a free kick in a 2–0 victory against Mexico.

=== International goals ===
Scores and results list Romania's goal tally first. "Score" column indicates the score after the player's goal.

#	Date	Venue	Opponent	Score	Result	Competition
1.	26 August 1992	Stadionul Național, Bucharest, Romania	Mexico	1–0	2–0	Friendly

== Honours ==
Politehnica Timișoara

- Divizia B: 1986–87, 1988–89, 1994–95
- Cupa României runner-up: 1991–92
