= 1992–93 Divizia A =

75th season of top-tier football league in Romania

Divizia A
- Season: 1992–93
- Champions: Steaua București
- Champions League: Steaua București
- UEFA Cup: Dinamo București; Rapid București; Gloria Bistrița
- Matches: 306
- Goals: 805 (2.63 per match)
- Top goalscorer: Ilie Dumitrescu (24)
- Biggest home win: Steaua 9–0 Reșița
- Biggest away win: U Cluj 1–5 Bistrița
- Highest scoring: Brașov 5–4 Farul; Farul 6–3 Oțelul; Steaua 9–0 Reșița
- Longest winning run: Steaua (9)
- Longest unbeaten run: Dinamo, Steaua (15)
- Longest winless run: Reșița, Bacău (9)
- Longest losing run: Reșița, Ploiești (5)

The 1992–93 Divizia A was the seventy-fifth season of Divizia A, the top-level football league of Romania.

== Teams ==
Location of teams in 1992-93 Divizia A

== League table ==
The country obtained a third place for the UEFA Cup following the UN ban of Yugoslavia.

Pos	Team	Pld	W	D	L	GF	GA	GD	Pts	Qualification or relegation
1	Steaua București (C)	34	25	7	2	84	22	+62	57	Qualification to Champions League first round
2	Dinamo București	34	23	7	4	81	24	+57	53	Qualification to UEFA Cup first round
3	FC U Craiova	34	16	10	8	50	36	+14	42	Qualification to Cup Winners' Cup first round
4	Rapid București	34	15	9	10	40	33	+7	39	Qualification to UEFA Cup first round Invitation to Intertoto Cup
5	Gloria Bistrița	34	15	5	14	45	41	+4	35	Qualification to UEFA Cup first round
6	Electroputere Craiova	34	13	9	12	35	32	+3	35	
7	Sportul Studenţesc București	34	13	8	13	40	43	−3	34	
8	Inter Sibiu	34	11	11	12	41	47	−6	33	
9	Farul Constanța	34	14	4	16	57	66	−9	32	
10	Oțelul Galați	34	13	6	15	40	49	−9	32	Invitation to Intertoto Cup
11	Universitatea Cluj	34	14	2	18	43	51	−8	30	
12	FC Brașov	34	12	6	16	36	45	−9	30	
13	Politehnica Timișoara	34	8	13	13	34	46	−12	29	
14	Dacia Unirea Brăila	34	10	9	15	36	51	−15	29	
15	Progresul București	34	9	11	14	38	53	−15	29	
16	FC Ploiești	34	12	3	19	47	50	−3	27	
17	Selena Bacău (R)	34	8	9	17	24	44	−20	25	Relegation to Divizia B
18	CSM Reșița (R)	34	9	3	22	34	72	−38	21	Relegation to Divizia B

Source: LT
Rules for classification: 1) points; 2) goal difference; 3) number of goals scored
(C) Champions; (R) Relegated

=== Results ===
Home \ Away	SEL	BRA	UCR	RES	DUB	DIN	EXT	FAR	GBI	INT	OȚE	PET	NAT	RAP	SPO	STE	POL	UCL
Selena Bacău	—	2–2	0–0	1–0	1–1	0–0	3–0	0–2	1–4	2–0	1–1	2–0	2–1	0–2	1–1	0–0	1–0	0–2
Brașov	1–0	—	0–1	4–0	3–0	0–2	1–0	5–4	1–0	0–0	4–1	2–0	0–0	1–0	0–0	1–3	0–0	3–1
Universitatea Craiova	4–0	1–0	—	3–2	0–0	2–1	1–1	3–2	3–0	2–2	4–0	2–0	2–2	2–1	1–0	0–0	1–1	2–0
Reșița	2–0	4–2	1–2	—	2–0	1–2	2–0	0–3	1–1	3–2	1–2	2–1	4–0	1–1	1–0	2–0	1–1	0–2
Dacia Unirea Brăila	2–0	2–0	2–2	3–1	—	1–1	1–0	4–1	2–0	3–2	3–2	1–0	2–2	0–0	1–1	1–3	0–0	4–2
Dinamo București	0–1	3–0	5–1	6–0	2–1	—	2–0	3–2	4–1	4–0	2–1	5–0	7–0	2–1	4–2	1–1	4–0	3–0
Electroputere Craiova	2–1	0–1	1–0	1–0	1–0	1–1	—	3–1	3–1	0–0	3–1	2–1	5–1	2–0	1–2	1–0	3–0	0–0
Farul Constanța	1–0	3–0	0–3	3–0	2–0	2–2	1–1	—	2–1	2–0	6–3	2–1	2–1	1–0	3–1	1–3	1–1	3–1
Gloria Bistrița	3–1	2–1	2–0	3–0	1–0	1–2	1–0	3–0	—	0–0	2–1	2–1	2–0	2–1	0–0	0–2	1–0	4–3
Inter Sibiu	2–1	0–0	4–1	3–2	1–1	1–1	1–0	2–0	1–0	—	0–1	2–1	2–1	1–0	3–3	1–1	0–0	3–0
Oțelul Galați	1–0	2–1	2–1	2–0	2–0	0–3	0–0	5–0	1–1	3–2	—	1–0	1–0	2–1	1–1	1–1	1–1	1–0
Petrolul Ploiești	4–0	2–0	0–1	2–0	2–0	0–1	2–2	3–1	2–1	3–0	3–0	—	3–0	1–1	4–1	0–2	3–1	3–2
Național București	0–0	2–1	0–0	2–0	3–0	1–1	0–0	2–2	2–0	4–2	2–0	2–0	—	2–2	1–2	1–2	2–1	1–0
Rapid București	1–0	2–0	2–1	2–0	3–0	2–0	2–0	2–0	2–0	0–0	1–0	1–0	1–1	—	2–1	1–1	2–2	1–0
Sportul Studenţesc București	1–2	4–1	0–0	2–0	1–0	0–3	1–0	2–1	1–0	1–0	1–0	4–2	0–0	0–1	—	0–3	3–0	2–1
Steaua București	2–0	3–0	3–1	9–0	7–1	1–0	3–0	6–2	2–1	1–0	2–1	4–2	2–0	3–0	1–0	—	6–0	3–2
Politehnica Timișoara	1–1	0–1	2–1	5–0	2–0	0–2	0–1	3–0	0–0	2–3	1–0	1–1	2–1	2–2	3–2	1–1	—	0–1
Universitatea Cluj	1–0	1–0	0–2	2–1	1–0	0–2	1–1	2–1	1–5	4–1	1–0	2–0	3–1	5–0	2–0	0–3	0–1	—

Source: LT (in Romanian)
Legend: Blue = home team win; Yellow = draw; Red = away team win.

== Top goalscorers ==
Position	Player	Club	Goals
1	Ilie Dumitrescu	Steaua București	24
2	Ilie Stan	Steaua București	20
3	Dorinel Munteanu	Dinamo București	15
4	Marian Popa	Farul Constanța	14
4	Marius Predatu	Universitatea Cluj	14

== Champion squad ==
Steaua București

Goalkeepers: Daniel Gherasim (23 / 0); Dumitru Stângaciu (12 / 0).
Defenders: Aurel Panait (22 / 0); Ion Sburlea (19 / 1); Ștefan Iovan (6 / 0); Bogdan Bucur (13 / 0); Ionel Pârvu (27 / 3); Anton Doboș (25 / 0); Cornel Cristescu (9 / 0); Daniel Prodan (20 / 1); Tiberiu Csik (2 / 0); Iulian Filipescu (27 / 3).
Midfielders: Constantin Gâlcă (29 / 4); Basarab Panduru (31 / 9); Ilie Stan (31 / 20); Daniel Iftodi (11 / 2); Ionel Fulga (17 / 0).
Forwards: Viorel Ion (32 / 4); Ilie Dumitrescu (29 / 24); Alexandru Andrași (16 / 1); Ion Vlădoiu (29 / 10); Adrian State (1 / 0); Remus Daniel Safta (8 / 2); Lavi Hrib (2 / 0).
(league appearances and goals listed in brackets)

Manager: Anghel Iordănescu.

== Attendances ==
#	Club	Average
1	FC Rapid	11,941
2	Farul	9,412
3	Oțelul	8,324
4	Steaua	7,706
5	Dinamo 1948	7,235
6	Reșița	7,235
7	Dacia Unirea	7,235
8	U Cluj	6,765
9	Craiova	6,529
10	Sibiu	6,059
11	Petrolul	5,588
12	Bacău	5,588
13	Timișoara	5,529
14	Gloria	4,824
15	Electroputere	4,618
16	Brașov	3,153
17	Progresul	2,824
18	Sportul Studențesc	2,812
