= Ion Sburlea =

Romanian footballer

Personal information
- Date of birth: 7 January 1971 (age 55)
- Place of birth: Târgu Cărbunești, Romania
- Height: 1.89 m (6 ft 2 in)
- Positions: Defensive midfielder; central defender

Senior career*
Years	Team	Apps	(Gls)
1989–1990	CS Universitatea Craiova	1	(0)
1990–1991	Jiul Petroșani	16	(0)
1991–1993	Steaua București	27	(1)
1993–1994	FC Universitatea Craiova	19	(0)
1995	Dinamo București	15	(0)
1996–1998	Național București	73	(11)
1998	Apollon Limassol	1	(1)
1999	Național București	1	(0)
1999–2000	Marítimo	3	(0)
2000–2001	Ceahlăul Piatra Neamț		
2001–2002	Astra Ploiești	2	(0)
Total		158	(13)

International career
1989	Romania Olympic	1	(0)
1991	Romania U21	4	(0)
1991	Romania B	1	(0)
- * Club domestic league appearances and goals

Ion Sburlea (born 7 January 1971) is a Romanian former footballer who played as a midfielder and defender.

== Honours ==
Steaua București

- Divizia A: 1992–93
- Cupa României: 1991–92

FC Universitatea Craiova

- Cupa României runner-up: 1993–94

Național București

- Cupa României runner-up: 1996–97
