= 1995–96 Divizia A =

78th season of top-tier football league in Romania

Divizia A
- Season: 1995–96
- Champions: Steaua București
- Relegated: Inter Sibiu; Politehnica Iaşi
- Champions League: Steaua București
- Cup Winners' Cup: Gloria Bistriţa
- UEFA Cup: Naţional București; Rapid București
- Intertoto Cup: Universitatea Craiova; Dinamo București
- Matches played: 306
- Goals scored: 805 (2.63 per match)
- Top goalscorer: Ion Vlădoiu (25)
- Biggest home win: Timișoara 9–1 Iaşi
- Biggest away win: Naţional 0–4 Rapid
- Highest scoring: Timișoara 9–1 Iaşi
- Longest winning run: Rapid, Steaua (5)
- Longest unbeaten run: Steaua (11)
- Longest losing run: Iaşi (5)

The 1995–96 Divizia A was the seventy-eighth season of Divizia A, the top-level football league of Romania.

== Teams ==
Location of teams in 1995-96 Divizia A

== League table ==
Pos	Team	Pld	W	D	L	GF	GA	GD	Pts	Qualification or relegation
1	Steaua București (C)	34	21	8	5	79	30	+49	71	Qualification to Champions League qualifying round
2	Național București	34	18	6	10	60	44	+16	60	Qualification to UEFA Cup qualifying round
3	Rapid București	34	18	5	11	59	33	+26	59	Qualification to UEFA Cup qualifying round
4	Universitatea Craiova	34	17	6	11	45	30	+15	57	Qualification to Intertoto Cup group stage
5	Dinamo București	34	15	7	12	40	37	+3	52	Qualification to Intertoto Cup group stage
6	Petrolul Ploiești	34	16	3	15	44	38	+6	51	
7	Politehnica Timișoara	34	14	7	13	58	47	+11	49 (Note: TIM 3-1 FAR; FAR 1-4 TIM)	
8	Farul Constanța	34	15	4	15	56	49	+7	49	
9	Universitatea Cluj	34	14	6	14	41	40	+1	48	
10	Brașov	34	13	7	14	38	60	−22	46	
11	Bacău	34	15	0	19	40	58	−18	45	
12	Gloria Bistrița	34	14	3	17	41	38	+3	45	Qualification to Cup Winners' Cup qualifying round
13	Oțelul Galați	34	14	3	17	42	46	−4	45	
14	Sportul Studențesc București	34	12	7	15	33	35	−2	43 (Note: SPO 1-0 CEA; CEA 1-0 SPO)	
15	Ceahlăul Piatra Neamț	34	13	4	17	34	46	−12	43	
16	Argeș Pitești	34	12	6	16	39	52	−13	42	
17	Inter Sibiu (R)	34	10	7	17	29	48	−19	37	Relegation to Divizia B
18	Politehnica Iași (R)	34	9	3	22	27	74	−47	30	Relegation to Divizia B

Source: LT (in Romanian)
Rules for classification: 1) points; 2) head-to-head points; 3) head-to-head goal difference; 4) head-to-head goals scored; 5) goal difference; 6) number of goals scored. Head-to-Head: used when head-to-head record is used to rank tied teams.
(C) Champions; (R) Relegated

=== Positions by round ===
Team ╲ Round	1	2	3	4	5	6	7	8	9	10	11	12	13	14	15	16	17	18	19	20	21	22	23	24	25	26	27	28	29	30	31	32	33	34
Argeș Pitești	12	6	9	7	5	8	6	7	8	8	7	9	10	13	17	11	9	10	8	11	9	10	10	10	11	14	13	14	16	17	16	16	15	16
Bacău	4	8	10	15	17	13	15	13	17	18	16	17	17	17	15	17	18	18	18	17	18	18	17	17	17	17	16	16	15	15	15	15	16	11
Brașov	11	14	17	13	9	12	13	10	12	10	15	11	16	11	14	13	12	13	11	13	11	11	11	12	12	9	10	8	9	12	10	11	9	10
Ceahlăul Piatra Neamț	17	13	14	10	8	5	5	4	3	4	5	4	5	5	6	6	6	8	9	8	12	14	15	14	14	13	14	12	13	11	9	10	14	15
Universitatea Craiova	2	4	3	4	4	3	4	3	4	3	3	3	3	2	3	5	4	5	4	3	3	3	3	4	4	3	3	3	4	5	5	4	4	4
Dinamo București	7	10	4	9	6	4	3	2	2	2	2	2	2	3	4	3	2	3	2	4	4	4	4	3	3	5	5	5	5	4	4	5	5	5
Farul Constanța	13	11	13	12	14	15	17	16	16	14	9	8	6	6	5	4	5	4	6	6	6	8	7	8	7	8	6	9	6	8	8	9	8	8
Gloria Bistrița	5	3	6	3	7	10	7	9	6	5	4	7	8	7	7	7	7	6	5	5	5	5	5	7	6	7	9	7	8	9	7	8	10	12
Inter Sibiu	8	5	8	11	13	14	12	15	11	13	10	12	9	12	13	16	13	14	13	9	13	16	16	16	15	16	17	17	17	16	17	17	17	17
Oțelul Galați	15	17	15	17	12	9	11	8	9	9	11	10	12	9	10	8	11	9	12	15	15	13	14	13	13	11	12	11	11	14	13	14	12	13
Petrolul Ploiești	3	7	5	5	3	6	8	6	7	6	6	6	7	10	8	9	8	7	7	7	7	6	8	6	8	6	7	6	7	6	6	6	6	6
Politehnica Iași	10	16	11	16	16	18	16	14	10	11	13	15	14	15	11	14	15	16	16	18	17	17	18	18	18	18	18	18	18	18	18	18	18	18
Național București	14	18	16	18	18	17	18	18	18	17	12	13	11	8	9	12	10	11	14	10	8	7	6	5	5	4	4	4	3	3	3	3	3	2
Rapid București	1	1	1	2	2	2	2	5	5	7	8	5	4	4	2	2	3	2	3	2	2	2	2	2	2	2	2	2	2	2	2	2	2	3
Sportul Studențesc București	16	9	12	8	11	11	10	12	14	12	14	16	15	16	12	15	16	17	17	16	16	15	13	15	16	15	15	15	14	13	14	12	13	14
Steaua București	9	2	2	1	1	1	1	1	1	1	1	1	1	1	1	1	1	1	1	1	1	1	1	1	1	1	1	1	1	1	1	1	1	1
Politehnica Timișoara	6	12	7	6	10	7	9	11	13	15	17	18	18	18	18	18	17	15	15	14	14	12	12	11	9	10	8	10	10	7	11	7	7	7
Universitatea Cluj	18	15	18	14	15	16	14	17	15	16	18	14	13	14	16	10	14	12	10	12	10	9	9	9	10	12	11	13	12	10	12	13	11	9

Source: LT (in Romanian)

=== Results ===
Home \ Away	ARG	BAC	BRA	CEA	UCR	DIN	FAR	GBI	INT	OȚE	PET	PIA	NAT	RAP	SPO	STE	POL	UCL
Argeș Pitești	—	2–0	1–1	1–1	2–0	1–0	2–1	2–1	2–1	2–2	2–1	6–0	4–0	3–2	1–0	1–2	0–0	0–2
Bacău	3–1	—	1–2	2–0	1–0	2–0	3–0	3–1	2–1	3–0	1–0	3–1	2–1	1–0	0–1	1–2	4–1	1–0
Brașov	1–1	2–1	—	0–0	1–1	2–1	3–1	1–0	2–1	1–0	1–0	2–0	0–0	1–0	4–3	1–0	1–1	1–0
Ceahlăul Piatra Neamț	1–0	3–1	2–1	—	0–2	2–0	0–0	1–0	2–0	3–1	1–2	1–0	1–2	0–1	1–0	2–1	1–0	2–0
Universitatea Craiova	2–1	1–0	3–1	4–0	—	3–1	2–1	1–0	2–0	3–0	3–0	3–0	1–0	2–0	1–0	1–1	3–1	0–0
Dinamo București	3–1	3–0	3–1	0–0	2–1	—	2–1	2–1	2–1	2–0	1–0	2–0	0–3	1–1	0–1	1–1	3–0	1–0
Farul Constanța	3–0	1–0	4–0	2–0	2–1	1–2	—	1–0	4–0	1–0	3–3	7–0	0–2	4–2	1–0	1–1	1–4	1–0
Gloria Bistrița	4–0	2–0	3–2	1–0	3–0	2–0	0–2	—	2–0	2–0	1–0	3–0	3–1	1–2	3–1	0–2	0–0	1–0
Inter Sibiu	0–0	0–2	3–0	2–0	2–0	0–0	3–2	0–0	—	1–1	2–1	0–1	1–0	2–1	2–0	0–0	1–1	1–0
Oțelul Galați	2–0	3–1	4–0	2–0	2–0	0–2	1–0	1–0	2–0	—	2–0	3–1	3–1	0–3	3–1	1–2	1–0	2–0
Petrolul Ploiești	1–0	3–0	4–2	3–2	1–0	1–0	2–0	2–0	1–0	2–0	—	5–0	0–0	2–1	1–0	2–2	2–0	2–0
Politehnica Iași	1–2	3–0	2–1	0–1	2–0	0–0	1–2	2–1	2–1	2–1	2–1	—	0–1	0–1	0–1	1–2	0–0	0–0
Național București	4–1	4–1	5–1	3–1	4–3	1–1	2–1	1–3	5–0	3–1	3–0	2–3	—	0–4	0–0	1–0	2–1	3–1
Rapid București	3–0	3–0	3–0	2–1	0–1	2–0	3–4	2–0	2–0	2–0	1–0	3–0	1–1	—	1–1	1–1	4–1	5–0
Sportul Studențesc București	3–0	3–0	2–0	1–0	0–0	0–1	2–1	2–1	0–1	1–1	2–1	3–1	0–0	0–0	—	0–2	1–0	2–3
Steaua București	4–0	5–0	5–0	6–2	1–0	4–2	2–2	3–1	3–1	1–0	2–1	4–0	5–1	3–0	1–1	—	5–1	4–0
Politehnica Timișoara	2–0	2–0	4–1	4–3	0–0	2–2	3–1	3–0	5–1	3–1	2–0	9–1	0–1	1–3	3–1	2–1	—	2–0
Universitatea Cluj	1–0	7–1	1–1	2–0	1–1	2–0	3–0	1–1	1–1	3–2	2–0	3–1	1–3	2–0	1–0	2–1	2–0	—

Source: LT (in Romanian)
Legend: Blue = home team win; Yellow = draw; Red = away team win.

== Top goalscorers ==
Position	Player	Club	Goals
1	Ion Vlădoiu	Steaua București	25
2	Marin Dună	Naţional București	17
3	Marcel Băban	Politehnica Timișoara	15
4	Ionel Dănciulescu	Dinamo București	14
5	Adrian Ilie	Steaua București	13

== Champion squad ==
Steaua București

Goalkeepers: Bogdan Stelea (25 / 0); Daniel Gherasim (12 / 0); Marius Mindileac (1 / 0).
Defenders: Anton Doboș (31 / 2); Daniel Prodan (31 / 5); Tiberiu Csik (26 / 2); Bogdan Bucur (21 / 0); Aurel Panait (18 / 0).
Midfielders: Iulian Filipescu (30 / 3); Ionel Pârvu (27 / 2); Constantin Gâlcă (29 / 4); Damian Militaru (26 / 3).
Forwards: Sabin Ilie (23 / 2); Adrian Ilie (24 / 13); Marius Lăcătuș (27 / 9); Roland Nagy (23 / 0); Narcis Răducan (30 / 3); Ion Vlădoiu (33 / 25); Laurențiu Roșu (29 / 3); Marius Mitu (1 / 0); Alin Stoica (1 / 0); Edward Iordănescu (1 / 0); Marin Dună (1 / 0).
(league appearances and goals listed in brackets)

Manager: Dumitru Dumitriu.
