= 1994–95 Divizia A =

77th season of top-tier football league in Romania

Divizia A
- Season: 1994–95
- Champions: Steaua București
- Relegated: Baia Mare; UTA Arad
- Champions League: Steaua București
- Cup Winners' Cup: Petrolul Ploieşti
- UEFA Cup: Universitatea Craiova; Dinamo București
- Intertoto Cup: Ceahlăul Piatra Neamţ; Farul Constanţa; Universitatea Cluj
- Matches played: 306
- Goals scored: 901 (2.94 per match)
- Top goalscorer: Gheorghe Craioveanu (27)
- Biggest home win: Craiova 10–3 UTA; Electroputere 8–1 Baia Mare
- Biggest away win: UTA 1–5 Steaua; Baia Mare 1–5 Naţional; Braşov 0–4 Naţional; Sportul 0–4 Dinamo; UTA 0–4 Craiova
- Highest scoring: Craiova 10–3 UTA
- Longest winning run: Steaua (8)
- Longest unbeaten run: Steaua (21)
- Longest losing run: UTA (6)

The 1994–95 Divizia A was the seventy-seventh season of Divizia A, the top-level football league of Romania.

== Teams ==
Location of teams in 1994-95 Divizia A

== League table ==
Pos	Team	Pld	W	D	L	GF	GA	GD	Pts	Qualification or relegation
1	Steaua București (C)	34	23	8	3	72	25	+47	77	Qualification to Champions League qualifying round
2	FC U Craiova	34	21	5	8	83	40	+43	68	Qualification to UEFA Cup preliminary round
3	Dinamo București	34	20	5	9	61	35	+26	65	Qualification to UEFA Cup preliminary round
4	Rapid București	34	16	6	12	55	42	+13	54	
5	Ceahlăul Piatra Neamț	34	16	5	13	56	54	+2	53	Qualification to Intertoto Cup group stage
6	Naţional București	34	16	4	14	66	60	+6	52 (Note: PRO: 9 pts; BIS: 6 pts; ARG: 3 pts)	
7	Gloria Bistrița	34	16	4	14	66	59	+7	52	
8	Argeș Pitești	34	16	4	14	47	54	−7	52	
9	Inter Sibiu	34	16	3	15	53	52	+1	51	
10	Petrolul Ploiești	34	14	7	13	44	41	+3	49	Qualification to Cup Winners' Cup qualifying round
11	Farul Constanța	34	13	6	15	42	49	−7	45	Qualification to Intertoto Cup group stage
12	Universitatea Cluj	34	13	4	17	39	42	−3	43	Qualification to Intertoto Cup group stage
13	Oțelul Galați	34	11	9	14	47	51	−4	42	
14	FC Brașov	34	10	9	15	40	54	−14	39	
15	Electroputere Craiova (R)	34	11	5	18	42	53	−11	38	Qualification to relegation play-offs
16	Sportul Studenţesc București	34	8	10	16	26	44	−18	34	Qualification to relegation play-offs
17	Maramureş Baia Mare (R)	34	6	9	19	34	69	−35	27	Relegation to Divizia B
18	UTA Arad (R)	34	4	9	21	28	77	−49	21	Relegation to Divizia B

Source: LT
Rules for classification: 1) points; 2) head-to-head points; 3) head-to-head goal difference; 4) head-to-head goals scored; 5) goal difference; 6) number of goals scored
(C) Champions; (R) Relegated

== Promotion / relegation play-off ==
Place	Team 1	Score	Team 2
Sfântu Gheorghe	Sportul Studențesc București	1–0	Corvinul Hunedoara
Brașov	Electroputere Craiova	2–2 (3–4 pen.)	Politehnica Iași

== Positions by round ==
Team ╲ Round	1	2	3	4	5	6	7	8	9	10	11	12	13	14	15	16	17	18	19	20	21	22	23	24	25	26	27	28	29	30	31	32	33	34
Argeș Pitești	3	3	1	5	4	9	5	9	5	7	5	6	10	11	8	7	4	6	4	7	5	7	8	6	5	7	7	8	5	7	6	7	9	8
Baia Mare	10	12	15	16	12	13	11	11	12	13	15	16	14	15	16	16	16	16	17	17	17	18	17	17	16	16	16	16	16	17	17	17	17	17
Brașov	14	10	14	13	17	12	15	16	15	17	17	17	17	14	15	14	14	14	15	14	14	14	14	15	15	15	15	15	14	15	14	14	14	14
Ceahlăul Piatra Neamț	4	4	7	11	7	10	7	10	7	8	7	5	6	5	7	5	6	5	9	10	8	8	7	9	8	6	5	5	6	5	7	5	5	5
FC U Craiova	12	14	16	14	14	15	13	12	11	9	6	8	5	4	3	3	3	2	2	2	2	2	2	2	2	2	2	2	2	2	2	2	2	2
Dinamo București	15	6	10	4	8	5	8	4	6	10	8	9	7	9	12	11	11	8	5	4	4	3	3	4	3	3	3	3	3	3	3	3	3	3
Electroputere Craiova	5	7	6	9	13	14	12	13	14	14	14	14	15	16	14	15	15	15	14	15	15	16	15	14	14	14	14	14	15	14	15	15	15	15
Farul Constanța	18	11	13	8	11	8	10	8	8	11	12	12	13	12	11	12	12	12	12	12	11	10	11	10	11	11	12	11	11	11	12	11	12	11
Gloria Bistrița	7	8	5	10	6	7	4	7	4	6	9	10	9	6	5	6	8	10	8	9	12	13	10	12	9	10	9	10	7	9	10	9	6	7
Inter Sibiu	8	16	12	7	10	6	9	6	10	5	4	4	4	7	6	9	10	11	11	11	10	9	12	8	10	9	10	9	10	8	9	8	10	9
Oțelul Galați	9	5	9	15	16	17	17	14	16	15	13	11	12	13	13	13	13	13	13	13	13	11	13	13	13	13	13	13	13	13	13	13	13	13
Petrolul Ploiești	2	1	4	3	5	2	6	5	9	4	10	7	8	8	9	8	5	4	7	6	7	6	5	5	7	5	6	7	9	10	8	10	8	10
Național București	6	9	3	1	1	3	1	1	1	1	2	1	1	1	1	2	2	3	3	3	3	4	6	7	6	8	8	6	8	6	5	6	7	6
Rapid București	1	2	2	2	2	1	2	2	3	3	3	2	2	3	4	4	7	9	6	5	6	5	4	3	4	4	4	4	4	4	4	4	4	4
Sportul Studențesc București	11	15	18	18	18	18	16	15	17	16	16	18	18	18	18	18	18	18	18	18	18	17	18	18	18	18	17	17	17	16	16	16	16	16
Steaua București	16	17	8	6	3	4	3	3	2	2	1	3	3	2	2	1	1	1	1	1	1	1	1	1	1	1	1	1	1	1	1	1	1	1
Universitatea Cluj	13	13	11	12	9	11	14	17	13	12	11	13	11	10	10	10	9	7	10	8	9	12	9	11	12	12	11	12	12	12	11	12	11	12
UTA Arad	17	18	17	17	15	16	18	18	18	18	18	15	16	17	17	17	17	17	16	16	16	15	16	16	17	17	18	18	18	18	18	18	18	18

Source: LT (in Romanian)

== Results ==
Home \ Away	ARG	BAI	BRA	CEA	UCR	DIN	ELC	FAR	GBI	INT	OȚE	PET	NAT	RAP	SPO	STE	UCL	UTA
Argeș Pitești	—	3–0	2–1	4–2	2–0	2–1	4–0	2–1	4–3	0–0	1–0	0–3	0–3	1–0	2–1	3–1	1–0	1–0
Baia Mare	2–3	—	1–1	1–3	2–0	2–0	2–0	1–1	1–3	2–3	1–1	3–0	1–5	2–0	1–1	0–1	1–2	3–1
Brașov	2–1	0–0	—	1–1	1–3	0–0	4–1	1–0	2–1	2–1	0–2	3–2	0–4	0–0	0–1	1–1	1–0	5–0
Ceahlăul Piatra Neamț	1–0	1–0	3–1	—	0–1	3–3	4–1	2–1	5–3	3–1	2–0	2–0	1–0	1–0	0–1	1–3	1–0	4–1
Universitatea Craiova	1–0	6–1	1–1	1–1	—	1–0	4–1	4–0	0–0	6–2	2–1	4–0	3–0	3–2	3–0	1–1	2–0	10–3
Dinamo București	4–0	2–0	4–0	1–0	0–1	—	3–0	4–2	7–4	2–1	3–2	1–0	3–1	2–0	2–0	0–0	2–0	1–1
Electroputere Craiova	0–0	8–1	2–0	1–1	5–4	3–1	—	0–1	0–0	2–0	3–2	2–0	3–1	0–1	0–0	0–1	1–0	3–1
Farul Constanța	2–1	0–0	2–2	3–1	0–1	1–0	1–0	—	2–1	2–0	2–0	2–0	1–1	2–1	2–1	0–1	2–1	4–0
Gloria Bistrița	3–2	6–1	2–1	3–1	2–0	1–2	0–0	2–1	—	3–1	3–0	2–0	2–1	3–2	1–0	4–3	2–1	2–0
Inter Sibiu	2–0	4–1	1–2	4–2	3–2	2–0	4–0	1–0	3–1	—	4–4	2–0	3–0	1–0	2–1	1–0	3–2	0–0
Oțelul Galați	1–2	3–0	3–2	3–1	2–0	1–2	1–0	2–0	0–0	1–0	—	0–0	2–5	4–0	2–0	0–1	0–0	2–1
Petrolul Ploiești	5–0	0–0	2–0	2–0	2–2	1–0	2–0	3–0	3–2	3–1	2–0	—	2–1	2–0	0–0	1–1	2–1	1–1
Național București	3–2	3–0	3–2	2–0	3–2	2–3	1–0	3–1	3–1	3–1	3–3	4–1	—	1–4	0–1	0–3	1–1	4–3
Rapid București	5–0	3–1	2–0	4–0	3–5	2–2	1–0	5–1	4–3	3–1	2–2	0–0	2–1	—	1–0	1–1	2–0	1–0
Sportul Studențesc București	2–0	2–2	1–1	1–2	0–3	0–4	1–0	3–3	2–1	0–1	1–1	2–0	1–1	0–1	—	0–2	1–0	1–1
Steaua București	1–0	0–0	5–0	5–2	1–0	2–0	4–2	2–1	3–1	2–0	5–1	2–0	6–0	1–1	3–0	—	3–2	1–1
Universitatea Cluj	3–3	2–1	2–1	1–1	1–3	0–1	2–1	2–0	2–1	2–0	2–0	2–1	2–0	1–2	1–0	0–1	—	2–1
UTA Arad	1–1	1–0	0–2	1–4	0–4	0–1	1–3	1–1	2–0	1–0	1–1	1–4	0–3	1–0	1–1	1–5	0–2	—

Source: LT (in Romanian)
Legend: Blue = home team win; Yellow = draw; Red = away team win.

== Top goalscorers ==
Position	Player	Club	Goals
1	Gheorghe Craioveanu	Universitatea Craiova	27
2	Florin Axinia	Ceahlăul Piatra Neamţ	23
3	Marin Dună	Naţional București	20
4	Ilie Lazăr	Gloria Bistriţa	16
4	Ion Vlădoiu	Rapid București	16

== Champion squad ==
Steaua București

Goalkeepers: Daniel Gherasim (16 / 0); Dumitru Stângaciu (28 / 0); Valentin Ion David (4 / 0).
Defenders: Tiberiu Csik (14 / 0); Aurel Panait (25 / 2); Bogdan Bucur (15 / 1); Iulian Filipescu (25 / 2); Ionel Pârvu (29 / 4); Anton Doboș (31 / 2); Daniel Prodan (31 / 2); Radu Cosma (1 / 0).
Midfielders: Constantin Gâlcă (31 / 9); Basarab Panduru (25 / 5); Damian Militaru (32 / 9); Ilie Stan (21 / 3); Daniel Iftodi (8 / 0); Roland Nagy (3 / 0).
Forwards: Marian Popa (14 / 7); Viorel Ion (8 / 0); Adrian Ilie (28 / 11); Marius Lăcătuș (29 / 8); Laurențiu Roșu (31 / 6); Cătălin Nicolae Popa (5 / 1); Marius Mitu (1 / 0); Costel Mozacu (1 / 0).
(league appearances and goals listed in brackets)

Manager: Dumitru Dumitriu.
