= 1995 Supercupa României =

- Event: 1995 Supercupa României
Steaua București	Petrolul Ploieşti
Divizia A	Cupa României
2	0
- Date: 5 August 1995 (18:00)
- Venue: Regie, Bucharest, Bucharest
- Referee: Adrian Porumboiu (Vaslui)
- Attendance: 10.000

The 1995 Supercupa României was the second edition of Romania's season opener cup competition. The match was played in Bucharest at Stadionul Regie on 5 August 1995, and was contested between Divizia A title holders, Steaua București and Cupa României champions, Petrolul Ploieşti. The winner was Steaua București.

== Match ==
5 August 1995
18:00

Steaua București	2–0	Petrolul Ploiești
Damian Militaru 25'; Ion Vlădoiu 56'	(Report)

Stadionul Regie
Attendance: 50.000
Referee: Adrian Porumboiu (Vaslui)

Steaua București	Petrolul Ploiești

STEAUA BUCUREȘTI:
P	1	(Romania) Bogdan Stelea
FD	3	(Romania) Tiberiu Csik
FC	6	(Romania) Daniel Prodan
FC	4	(Romania) Anton Doboș
FS	2	(Romania) Aurel Panait
MD	5	(Romania) Bogdan Bucur
MO	8	(Romania) Damian Militaru	(substituted off) 69'
MD	10	(Romania) Iulian Filipescu	(substituted off) 59'
A	7	(Romania) Marius Lăcătuș
A	11	(Romania) Marin Dună
A	9	(Romania) Ion Vlădoiu
Substitutes:
A	––	(Romania) Laurențiu Roșu		(substituted in) 59'
A	––	(Romania) Sabin Ilie	(substituted in) 69'	(yellow card) 69' (yellow-red card) 82'
Coach:
(Romania) Dumitru Dumitriu

PETROLUL PLOIEȘTI:
P	1	(Romania) Ștefan Preda
FD	2	(Romania) Daniel Chiriță
FC	4	(Romania) Gheorghe Bălăceanu
FC	6	(Romania) Valeriu Răchită
FS	3	(Romania) Gheorghe Leahu
M	7	(Romania) Mihai Pârlog	(substituted off) 75'
M	5	(Romania) Octavian Grigore
M	10	(Romania) Cristian Zmoleanu
M	8	(Romania) Marcel Abăluță	(yellow card) 67'
A	9	(Romania) Adrian Toader	(substituted off) 63'
A	11	(Romania) Daniel Zafiris
Substitutes:
A	––	(Romania) Ioan Andrecuț		(substituted in) 63'
M	––	(Romania) Gheorghe Matei		(substituted in) 75'
Coach:
(Romania) Ion Marin

MATCH OFFICIALS

- Assistant referees:
  - Dan Ologeanu
  - Patrițiu Abrudan (Cluj-Napoca)
- Fourth official:

MAN OF THE MATCH

MATCH RULES

- 90 minutes.
- 30 minute de prelungire (două reprize de 15 minute)
- 30 minutes extra-time (15 minute intervals)
- Penalty shoot-out if scores level after extra time.
- Seven named substitutes
- Maximum of three substitutions.

== See also ==
- 1995–96 Divizia A
- 1995–96 Cupa României
