= Aurel Panait =

Romanian footballer

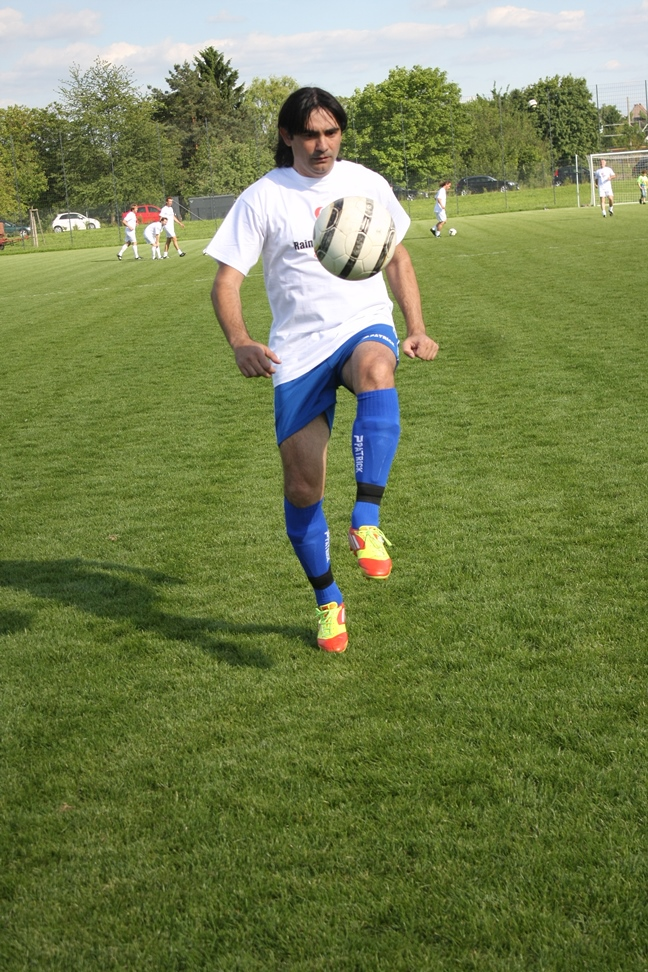
- Panait in 2014

Personal information
- Full name: Aurel Silviu Panait
- Date of birth: 27 August 1968 (age 58)
- Place of birth: Ploiești, Romania
- Height: 1.78 m (5 ft 10 in)
- Positions: Right-back; centre-back; right midfielder

Senior career*
Years	Team	Apps	(Gls)
1986–1991	Petrolul Ploiești	86	(2)
1991–1996	Steaua București	110	(5)
1996	Mödling		
1997	Wuppertal	30	(2)
1998	Mainz 05	9	(0)
1998–1999	Wuppertal	21	(1)
1999–2000	Wehen	20	(1)
2000–2001	BFC Dynamo	22	(0)
Total		298	(11)

International career
1992	Romania	1	(0)
- * Club domestic league appearances and goals

Aurel Silviu Panait (born 27 August 1968) is a Romanian former footballer who played as a defender and midfielder.

== International career ==
Aurel Panait played one friendly game at international level for Romania, when coach Cornel Dinu sent him on the field to replace Ilie Dumitrescu in the 69th minute of a 2–0 victory against Latvia.

== Honours ==
Petrolul Ploiești

- Divizia B: 1988–89

Steaua București

- Divizia A: 1992–93, 1993–94, 1994–95, 1995–96
- Cupa României: 1991–92, 1995–96
- Supercupa României: 1994, 1995

Dynamo Berlin

- NOFV-Oberliga Nord: 1991–92
