= Tiberiu Csik =

Romanian former professional footballer

Personal information
- Date of birth: 12 December 1971 (age 54)
- Place of birth: Satu Mare, Romania
- Height: 1.85 m (6 ft 1 in)
- Position: Defender

Team information
- Current team: Satu Mare (manager)

Youth career
- Olimpia Satu Mare

Senior career*
| Years | Team | Apps | (Gls) |
| 1988–1991 | Olimpia Satu Mare | ? | (?) |
| 1992 | Politehnica Timișoara | 37 | (0) |
| 1993–1999 | Steaua București | 84 | (3) |
| 1997 | → Jiul Petroșani (loan) | 8 | (0) |
| 1999–2000 | Újpest | 0 | (0) |
| 2000–2001 | Rocar București | 1 | (0) |
| 2001–2003 | Kaposvár | 45 | (1) |
| 2003–2005 | Olimpia Satu Mare | 54 | (2) |
| 2005–2006 | Universitatea Cluj | 23 | (0) |
| 2006–2007 | Minerul Lupeni | 36 | (0) |
| 2007 | Someșul Satu Mare | ? | (?) |
| Total | | 288+ | (6) |

Managerial career
- 2008–2014: Olimpia Satu Mare
- 2014: Olimpia Satu Mare (technical director)
- 2014–2016: Olimpia Satu Mare
- 2016: Olimpia Satu Mare (assistant)
- 2017: Olimpia Satu Mare (youth)
- 2018: Olimpia Satu Mare (assistant)
- 2020: Voința Lazuri
- 2021: Satu Mare (assistant)
- 2021–2023: Satu Mare
- * Club domestic league appearances and goals as of 14:35, 12 April 2022 (UTC)

Tiberiu Csik (born 12 December 1971) is a Romanian former professional footballer who played as a defender. After retirement Csik was associated for many years with his hometown team, Olimpia Satu Mare, in various positions ( main coach, youth coach, etc.), until the club was forced into dissolution in 2018. After leaving Olimpia, Csik had a brief stint with Csenger FC in Hungary followed by Vointa Lazuri back in Romania.

He is the older brother of former footballer Levente Csik.

== Honours ==
Steaua București

- Liga I (6): 1992–93, 1993–94, 1994–95, 1995–96, 1996–97, 1997–98
- Cupa României (3): 1995–96, 1996–97, 1998–99
- Supercupa României (3): 1994, 1995, 1998
