= Daniel Gherasim =

Romanian footballer

Personal information
- Full name: Daniel Gherasim
- Date of birth: 2 November 1964 (age 61)
- Place of birth: București, Romania
- Height: 1.82 m (6 ft 0 in)
- Position: Goalkeeper

Youth career
- 1979–1985: Steaua București

Senior career*
Years	Team	Apps	(Gls)
1985–1986	Mecanica Fină București		
1986–1987	FC Constanța		
1987–1990	Olt Scorniceşti	46	(0)
1988–1989	→ Universitatea Craiova (loan)	1	(0)
1990–1998	Steaua București	87	(0)
Total		134	(0)

International career
1996	Romania	2	(0)

Managerial career
- 1997–1998: Steaua București (assistant coach)
- 2002: Jiul Petroșani
- * Club domestic league appearances and goals

Daniel Gherasim (born 2 November 1964 in București) is a former Romanian professional footballer. His son Mihai Gherasim was also a football goalkeeper.

== International career ==
Daniel Gherasim played two games at international level for Romania, making his debut in a 1998 World Cup qualification match when he came as a substitute and replaced Florin Prunea in the 84th of a 3–0 victory against Lithuania.

== Honours ==
Steaua București

- Liga I: 1992–93, 1993–94, 1994–95, 1995–96, 1996–97, 1997–98
- Cupa României: 1991–92, 1995–96, 1996–97
