= Ionel Pârvu =

Romanian footballer

Personal information
- Full name: Ionel Antonel Pârvu
- Date of birth: 23 June 1970 (age 56)
- Place of birth: Curtea de Argeș, Romania
- Height: 1.80 m (5 ft 11 in)
- Position: Centre midfielder

Senior career*
Years	Team	Apps	(Gls)
1988–1992	Brașov	110	(20)
1992–1996	Steaua București	112	(12)
1996–1997	PAOK Thessaloniki	18	(1)
1997–1998	Onești	5	(0)
1998	Fortuna Düsseldorf	7	(0)
1998–1999	Onești	8	(2)
1999	Farul Constanţa	4	(0)
1999–2000	SV Sandhausen	8	(2)
2000	Onești	13	(2)
2000–2001	Metalurh Zaporizhzhia	23	(2)
2000–2001	→ Metalurh-2 Zaporizhzhia	12	(3)
2000	→ SSSOR-Metalurh Zaporizhzhia	1	(0)
2001–2003	Tavriya Simferopol	36	(1)
2003	Chernomorets Novorossiysk	5	(0)
2004–2005	Tavriya Simferopol	21	(2)
2005	Politehnica Iași	9	(1)
2005–2006	Brașov	2	(0)
2023–2024	SR Brașov	8	(1)
Total		402	(51)

International career
1993	Romania	1	(0)

Managerial career
- 2023: SR Brașov
- * Club domestic league appearances and goals as of 20:28, 14 January 2024 (UTC)

Ionel Pârvu (born 23 June 1970) is a Romanian football player and manager who currently acts as a player-manager for SR Brașov.

== International career ==
Pârvu made one appearance at international level for Romania on 22 September 1993 under coach Anghel Iordănescu in a friendly match which ended with a 1–0 victory against Israel.

== Honours ==
Steaua București

- Liga I: 1992–93, 1993–94, 1994–95, 1995–96
- Cupa României: 1995–96
- Supercupa României: 1994

SV Sandhausen

- Oberliga Baden-Württemberg: 2000
