= Basarab Panduru =

Romanian footballer

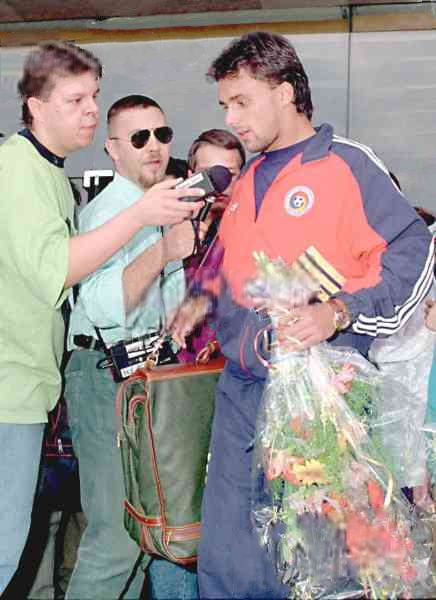
- Panduru being interviewed by journalists in 1994

Personal information
- Full name: Basarab Nică Panduru
- Date of birth: 11 July 1970 (age 56)
- Place of birth: Mârzănești, Romania
- Height: 1.73 m (5 ft 8 in)
- Position: Attacking midfielder

Youth career
- Automatica Alexandria
- –1987: CSM Reşiţa

Senior career*
Years	Team	Apps	(Gls)
1987–1990	CSM Reşiţa	62	(16)
1991–1995	Steaua București	131	(34)
1995–1998	Benfica	49	(7)
1996	→ Neuchâtel Xamax (loan)	7	(0)
1998–2000	Porto	6	(0)
2000	→ Salgueiros (loan)	7	(1)
Total		262	(58)

International career
1992–1996	Romania	22	(1)

Managerial career
- 2002: Poli AEK Timișoara
- 2003–2004: Poli AEK Timișoara
- 2004–2005: Oțelul Galați
- 2005: Vaslui
- 2006–2007: Farul Constanţa
- 2007–2008: Progresul București
- 2009–2010: Steaua București (sporting director)
- 2020: Al-Wasl (assistant)
- 2021–2022: Universitatea Craiova (assistant)
- * Club domestic league appearances and goals

Basarab Nică Panduru (born 11 July 1970) is a Romanian former professional footballer who played as an attacking midfielder. He is a television pundit for Orange Sport.

== Club career ==
Born in Mârzănești, Romania, Panduru started his professional career with CSM Reșița where he played between 1987 and 1990, before being signed by Steaua București at the beginning of 1991. Panduru's first game with Steaua was in the Romanian Cup, when the Steaua's officials did not take into consideration that just prior leaving CSM Reșița, Panduru was set to miss the next game due to yellow cards, therefore Steaua București lost that game after a federal decision.

As soon as he joined Steaua București he became an important part of the team. In 1995, however he left Romania to play for Benfica. The life in the capital of Portugal was not that easy, and he was loaned to Neuchâtel Xamax for half a season, before re-joining Benfica at the start of the 1996–97 season.

In 1998, he was bought by Benfica's rivals from Porto but failed to make an impact. During the summer of 1999, Panduru was close to sign a contract with Brazilian club Internacional however, the transfer did not materialize. Then Panduru signed for Salgueiros on loan from Porto, his third team in Portugal but after only half-a-season and long-term injuries Panduru decided to retire and become coach.

== International career ==
During his career Panduru earned 22 caps for Romania, scoring one goal, and was in the squad for the 1994 World Cup.

== Managerial career ==
Panduru's first coaching agreement was the one with Poli AEK Timișoara, signed in 2002. At Timișoara he met his former teammate from Steaua București, Anton Doboş, now the team's co-owner. The couple worked well together for a while, but in 2004 Panduru basically sacked himself when he made a bad remark, by saying: "The defenders are not footballers, they are only the ones who help the footballers". What Panduru did not take into consideration was that Anton Doboş, his boss, played as a defender.

He signed a new contract, this time with Oţelul Galaţi for the second half of the 2004–05 season without a league game, he left the team to sign with FC Vaslui in the summer of 2005, from where he was sacked after only few games. He was then the coach of Farul Constanţa before being sacked by the team owner after poor results.

At the end of October 2007 he signed on to manage second league team Progresul București.

In September 2009, Panduru was announced the new Director of Football of Steaua București, but on 14 May 2010, he resigned from this position, after a mutual agreement with the club's owner George Becali.

== Playing statistics ==
Appearances and goals by national team and year
National team	Year	Apps	Goals
Romania	1992	2	0
Romania	1993	3	1
Romania	1994	9	0
Romania	1995	6	0
Romania	1996	2	0
Total		22	1

Scores and results list Romania's goal tally first, score column indicates score after each Panduru goal.

List of international goals scored by Basarab Panduru
No.	Date	Venue	Opponent	Score	Result	Competition
1	22 September 1993	Stadionul Steaua, Bucharest, Romania	Israel	1–0	1–0	Friendly

== Honours ==
Steaua București

- Divizia A: 1992–93, 1993–94, 1994–95
- Cupa României: 1991–92
- Supercupa României: 1994

Benfica

- Taça de Portugal runner-up: 1996–97

Porto

- Primeira Divisão: 1998–99
- Supertaça Cândido de Oliveira: 1999
