= Alexandru Andrași =

Romanian footballer

Personal information
- Full name: Alexandru Csaba Andrași
- Date of birth: 13 May 1965 (age 61)
- Position: Midfielder

Senior career*
| Years | Team | Apps | (Gls) |
| 1986–1991 | FC Brașov | | |
| 1991–1993 | Steaua București | 38 | (6) |
| 1993–1994 | Rapid București | | |
| 1995–2000 | Vác | | |
| 2000–2002 | FC Brașov | | |
- * Club domestic league appearances and goals

Alexandru Andrași (born 13 May 1965) is a retired Romanian football midfielder. His brother, Iuliu was also a footballer, they played together at FC Brașov.

== Honours ==
Steaua București

- Divizia A: 1992–93
- Cupa României: 1991–92
