= Ilie Stan =

Romanian footballer and manager

Personal information
- Date of birth: 17 October 1967 (age 59)
- Place of birth: Căldărăști, Romania
- Height: 1.77 m (5 ft 10 in)
- Position: Midfielder

Youth career
- 1979–1985: Gloria Buzău

Senior career*
Years	Team	Apps	(Gls)
1985–1987	Gloria Buzău	41	(3)
1987–1995	Steaua București	176	(57)
1995–1996	Cercle Brugge	32	(1)
1997	Steaua București	11	(2)
1997	Național București	1	(0)
1997–1998	AEL Limassol	25	(2)
1998–1999	Hapoel Petah Tikva	22	(1)
1999–2000	Hapoel Tzafririm Holon	24	(3)
Total		332	(69)

International career
1992–1994	Romania	3	(0)

Managerial career
- 2001–2002: Al Ain (assistant)
- 2002: Romania (assistant)
- 2002–2003: Al-Shabab (assistant)
- 2003–2004: Al-Seeb
- 2004: UTA Arad
- 2004: Romania (assistant)
- 2005–2006: Al-Ittihad (assistant)
- 2006: FCM Târgovişte
- 2006–2007: Gloria Buzău
- 2007–2008: Dunărea Giurgiu
- 2008–2011: Victoria Brăneşti
- 2011: CS Mioveni
- 2011–2012: Steaua București
- 2012–2013: Concordia Chiajna
- 2013: FC Vaslui
- 2013–2014: FC Brașov
- 2014: Al Urooba
- 2015: Zakho
- 2016: Farul Constanța
- 2016: Al-Shamal
- 2016–2017: ASA Târgu Mureș
- 2017–2019: Foolad (technical manager)
- 2018: Foolad (caretaker)
- 2019–2021: Gloria Buzău
- 2021: FC Brașov
- 2022: Al-Seeb
- 2022–2023: Kazma
- 2023–2024: Al-Taraji
- 2024: Al-Hamriyah
- 2025: Gloria Buzău
- 2026: Saham
- * Club domestic league appearances and goals

Ilie Stan (born 17 October 1967) is a Romanian professional football manager and former player.

== Career statistics ==
Romania
Year	Apps	Goals
1992	1	0
1993	0	0
1994	2	0
Total	3	0

== Honours ==
=== Player ===
Steaua București

- Divizia A: 1987–88, 1988–89, 1992–93, 1993–94, 1994–95, 1996–97
- Cupa României: 1988–89, 1991–92, 1996–97
- Supercupa României: 1994, 1995
- European Cup runner-up: 1988–89

Cercle Brugge

- Belgian Cup runner-up: 1995–96

=== Coach ===
Victoria Brănești

- Liga II: 2009–10
- Liga III: 2008–09

Al-Seeb

- Oman Super Cup: 2022
