= Marius Mitu =

Romanian footballer

Personal information
- Full name: Marius Daniel Mitu
- Date of birth: 10 September 1976 (age 50)
- Place of birth: Bucharest, Romania
- Height: 1.79 m (5 ft 10 in)
- Position: Midfielder

Team information
- Current team: Peterborough Lions RFC (head coach)

Youth career
- Steaua București

Senior career*
Years	Team	Apps	(Gls)
1994–1996	Steaua București	4	(0)
1995	→ Steaua II București (loan)	15	(2)
1995–1996	→ La Louvière (loan)	13	(1)
1996–1997	FCM Târgoviște	11	(0)
1997–1999	Farul Constanța	57	(2)
1999–2000	Rocar București	32	(10)
2000–2001	Universitatea Craiova	25	(1)
2001–2002	RWDM	22	(2)
2002–2005	Lierse	90	(18)
2005–2006	Anderlecht	2	(1)
2006–2008	Metalurh Donetsk	39	(3)
2008	→ Skoda Xanthi (loan)	1	(0)
2009	Progresul București	1	(0)
2009	Panthrakikos	7	(1)
2010–2012	Râmnicu Vâlcea	28	(2)
Total		347	(43)

Managerial career
- 2018–: Romania minifootball
- * Club domestic league appearances and goals

Marius Mitu (born 10 September 1976) is a Romanian former professional footballer who played as a midfielder.

Mitu has played for Anderlecht until February 2006 and has appeared at Lierse previously. Mitu also played for R.W.D. Molenbeek (one year) and La Louvière (six months) in Belgium. Prior to his move to Belgium in 2001, he played for several Romanian clubs such as Steaua București and FC Universitatea Craiova.

He last played for CSM Râmnicu Vâlcea.
