= Ilie Dumitrescu =

Romanian footballer (born 1969)

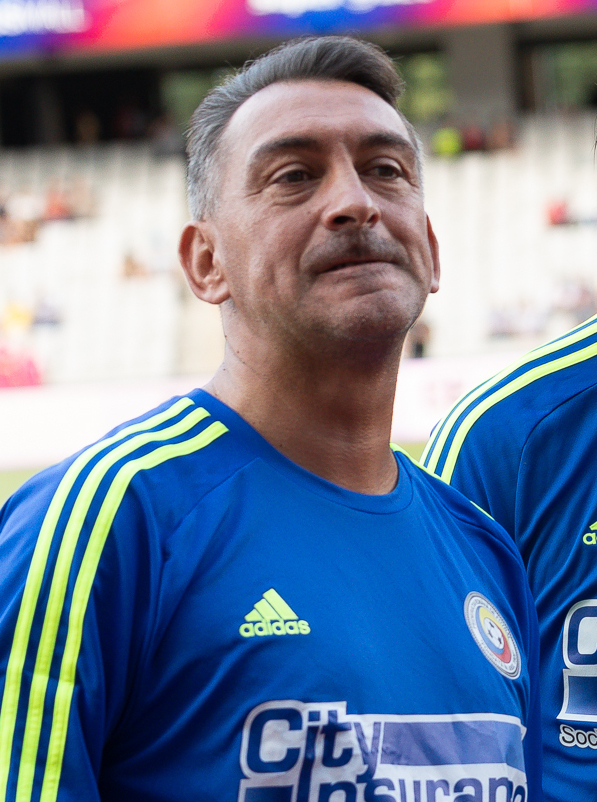
- Dumitrescu in 2018

Personal information
- Date of birth: 6 January 1969 (age 57)
- Place of birth: Bucharest, Romania
- Height: 1.72 m (5 ft 8 in)
- Position: Winger

Youth career
- 1977–1987: Steaua București

Senior career*
| Years | Team | Apps | (Gls) |
| 1987–1994 | Steaua București | 165 | (71) |
| 1987–1988 | → Olt Scorniceşti (loan) | 31 | (1) |
| 1994–1995 | Tottenham Hotspur | 18 | (4) |
| 1995 | → Sevilla (loan) | 13 | (1) |
| 1996 | West Ham United | 10 | (0) |
| 1996–1997 | América | 13 | (1) |
| 1997–1998 | Atlante | 27 | (3) |
| 1998 | Steaua București | 7 | (3) |
| Total | | 284 | (84) |

International career
| 1989–1998 | Romania | 64 | (20) |

Managerial career
- 2000: FC Braşov (sporting director)
- 2000–2001: Oţelul Galaţi
- 2001: FC Braşov
- 2001–2002: Alki Larnaca
- 2002: Romania U21
- 2002–2003: FCM Bacău
- 2003–2004: Apollon Limassol
- 2004: AEK Athens
- 2005: Egaleo
- 2005: Akratitos
- 2005–2006: Kallithea
- 2006: PAOK
- 2009: Panthrakikos
- 2010: Steaua București
- * Club domestic league appearances and goals

Ilie Dumitrescu (Romanian pronunciation: [iˈli.e dumiˈtresku]; born 6 January 1969) is a former Romanian professional football manager and former player, who is currently a television sport pundit for Digi Sport.

As a player, he was a winger who notably played in the Premier League with Tottenham Hotspur and West Ham United, and in La Liga with Sevilla. He began and finished his career with Steaua București, had spells in Mexico with América and Atlante and had a brief loan spell with Olt Scorniceşti during the early stages of his career. He initially shot to fame when his frontline partnership with Gheorghe Hagi and Florin Răducioiu led the Romania national team to the 1994 FIFA World Cup quarter-finals. In eliminating Argentina en route, Dumitrescu scored twice in a 3–2 win, despite playing in an unfamiliar striker position with Răducioiu unavailable. Overall he was capped 62 times, scoring 20 goals and was also a participant at the 1990 and 1998 FIFA World Cups.

Following retirement, Dumitrescu has had an extensive career as a manager in his native country as well as Greece and Cyprus, with a spells at Oţelul Galaţi, FC Braşov, Alki Larnaca, Romania U21, FCM Bacău, Apollon Limassol, AEK Athens, Egaleo, Akratitos, Kallithea, PAOK, Panthrakikos, and Steaua București.

== Club career ==
Born in Bucharest, Dumitrescu joined the Steaua București academy in 1977 at the age of 8 and made his way through the youth system. In April 1987, he made his debut in Divizia A at the age of 18. Steaua, who had won the European Champions Cup the previous year, loaned Dumitrescu to Olt Scorniceşti to gain more experience.

At Olt Scornicești, Dumitrescu was a regular starter, playing as left full-back.

Returning from his loan, Dumitrescu became an important part of the Steaua București squad, playing alongside big names such as Marius Lăcătuş and Gheorghe Hagi. After the 1990 World Cup in Italy, the best of his club teammates got contracts abroad, but Dumitrescu remained with Steaua and became the side's captain. With Steaua, he won the Romanian Cup in 1992, the championship in 1993 and played in the quarterfinals of the Cup Winners' Cup the same year.

Impressed by his performance at the USA World Cup in 1994, the representatives of Tottenham Hotspur were keen to offer him a contract. The North London side paid £2.6 million for Dumitrescu. He was later loaned out to Sevilla FC, with the La Liga side given an option to buy him during the loan.

Dumitrescu had a good time in southern Spain but the club baulked at the transfer fee Tottenham demanded. Dumitrescu returned to England.

After playing in the first half of the 1995–96 Premiership season and failing to impress, Dumitrescu was sold to West Ham United, where Harry Redknapp wanted to make him the player he once was. Dumitrescu played only 10 games before encountering problems with his work permit. His contract with West Ham was broken, leaving him free agent.

In the summer of 1996 he signed a contract with Club América in Mexico and before switching to their rivals Atlante a year later.

After two years in Mexico, Dumitrescu returned to Steaua București in 1998. Halfway through the season he announced his retirement as a professional player aged only 29.

== International career ==
In 1989, Dumitrescu made his debut for Romania national team, being used as a substitute in a game against Greece. Dumitrescu was part of the Romanian squad at the 1990 FIFA World Cup.

At the 1994 World Cup Dumitrescu played all the five games his team played in America. He was a key player in Romania's surprise 3–2 victory over previous runners-up Argentina, scoring the first two goals and assisting the third. His first goal came in the 11th minute and came direct via an eye-catching free kick from a wide position. Argentina equalized almost instantly from a penalty but Romania regained the lead minutes later through a well-worked passing move that enabled Dumitrescu to score from close range. The victory enabled Romania to progress to the quarter-finals; a first for the Romania national team.

== Managerial career ==
Following a short-lived career as a player agent – he had established a company called "Sport & Business World" in 1998 –, Dumitrescu took on his first position as a manager in 2000 signing with Oţelul Galaţi from Romania's Divizia A. From Galaţi he moved to FC Brașov and then Cypriot side Alki Larnaca in 2001–02. Here he won promotion to the Cypriot First Division and his team started the season very well, beating some of the best sides in Cyprus. However at the end of the season his team finished 11th. He then took the head coach role of the Romanian under 21 side. But Dumitrescu lasted only 6 weeks in the role.

Subsequently, he took control of FCM Bacău in Divizia A. However, after a disappointing season, Dumitrescu resigned in May 2003, leaving FCM Bacău in the relegation zone. Dumitrescu again went to Cyprus, this time as a coach for Apollon Limassol. By playing the Italian defensive system catenaccio, they won 12 of their first 13 matches and Dumitrescu was named the best manager in Cyprus for the year 2004. Dumitrescu soon moved on to his 6th club side, being named manager of the Greek side AEK Athens in February 2004.

His roving managerial career continued as he left AEK to join Egaleo, also from the Alpha Ethniki. The next three years found him at three other Greek clubs: Akratitos, Kallithea and PAOK. Dumitrescu was criticised for his style of play by PAOK fans. Having joined the club in February, he resigned in October.

After three years without a club he became manager of Panthrakikos in May 2009, but was sacked after only one game.

He ended his coaching career at Steaua București. He had spent only 40 days there, and resigned saying that he does not want to stay where he is not wanted.

== Personal life ==
After leaving Steaua București, he no longer considered any coaching jobs, and focused on running his business, a high-class restaurant in the centre of Bucharest, in which he had invested some of the money earned in his sports career, has been a regular guest commentator for television stations covering football matches, and endorsed a sports bets company.

== Playing statistics ==
Appearances and goals by national team and year
| National team | Year | Apps | Goals |
|---|---|---|---|
| Romania | 1989 | 4 | 0 |
| Romania | 1990 | 11 | 0 |
| Romania | 1991 | 4 | 0 |
| Romania | 1992 | 5 | 2 |
| Romania | 1993 | 9 | 5 |
| Romania | 1994 | 17 | 10 |
| Romania | 1995 | 5 | 1 |
| Romania | 1996 | 2 | 0 |
| Romania | 1997 | 4 | 1 |
| Romania | 1998 | 3 | 1 |
| Total | | 64 | 20 |

Scores and results list Romania's goal tally first, score column indicates score after each Dumitrescu goal.

| # | Date | Venue | Opponent | Score | Result | Competition |
|---|---|---|---|---|---|---|
| 1 | 26 August 1992 | Stadionul Național, Bucharest, Romania | Mexico | 2–0 | 2–0 | Friendly |
| 2 | 14 November 1992 | Stadionul Steaua, Bucharest, Romania | Czechoslovakia | 1–0 | 1–1 | 1994 FIFA World Cup qualification |
| 3 | 3 February 1993 | National Stadium of Peru, Lima, Peru | Peru | 2–0 | 2–0 | Friendly |
| 4 | 6 February 1993 | Harder Stadium, Santa Barbara, United States | United States | 1–1 | 1–1 | Friendly |
| 5 | 14 April 1993 | Stadionul Steaua, Bucharest, Romania | Cyprus | 1–1 | 2–1 | 1994 FIFA World Cup qualification |
| 6 | 14 April 1993 | Stadionul Steaua, Bucharest, Romania | Cyprus | 2–1 | 2–1 | 1994 FIFA World Cup qualification |
| 7 | 13 October 1993 | Stadionul Steaua, Bucharest, Romania | Belgium | 2–0 | 2–1 | 1994 FIFA World Cup qualification |
| 8 | 13 February 1994 | Hong Kong Stadium, Causeway Bay, Hong Kong | United States | 1–0 | 2–1 | Friendly |
| 9 | 13 February 1994 | Hong Kong Stadium, Causeway Bay, Hong Kong | United States | 2–1 | 2–1 | Friendly |
| 10 | 16 February 1994 | Changwon Stadium, Changwon, South Korea | South Korea | 1–1 | 2–1 | Friendly |
| 11 | 16 February 1994 | Changwon Stadium, Changwon, South Korea | South Korea | 2–1 | 2–1 | Friendly |
| 12 | 20 April 1994 | Stadionul Steaua, Bucharest, Romania | Bolivia | 1–0 | 3–0 | Friendly |
| 13 | 20 April 1994 | Stadionul Steaua, Bucharest, Romania | Bolivia | 2–0 | 3–0 | Friendly |
| 14 | 25 May 1994 | Stadionul Steaua, Bucharest, Romania | Nigeria | 1–0 | 2–0 | Friendly |
| 15 | 3 July 1994 | Rose Bowl, Pasadena, United States | Argentina | 1–0 | 3–2 | 1994 FIFA World Cup |
| 16 | 3 July 1994 | Rose Bowl, Pasadena, United States | Argentina | 2–1 | 3–2 | 1994 FIFA World Cup |
| 17 | 12 October 1994 | Wembley Stadium, London, England | England | 1–0 | 1–1 | Friendly |
| 18 | 26 April 1995 | Hüseyin Avni Aker Stadium, Trabzon, Turkey | Azerbaijan | 2–1 | 4–1 | UEFA Euro 1996 qualifying |
| 19 | 20 August 1997 | Stadionul Steaua, Bucharest, Romania | Macedonia | 3–1 | 4–2 | 1998 FIFA World Cup qualification |
| 20 | 6 June 1998 | Ilie Oană Stadium, Ploiești, Romania | Moldova | 3–0 | 5–1 | Friendly |

== Honours ==
=== Player ===
Steaua București

- Divizia A: 1986–87, 1988–89, 1992–93, 1993–94
- Cupa României: 1986–87, 1988–89, 1991–92
- Supercupa României: 1998
- European Cup runner-up: 1988–89

Individual

- Divizia A Golden Boot: 1992–93
