= Marcel Băban =

Romanian footballer (born 1968)

Personal information
- Date of birth: 16 October 1968 (age 58)
- Place of birth: Jimbolia, Romania
- Position: Striker

Senior career*
| Years | Team | Apps | (Gls) |
| 1991–1993 | Politehnica Timișoara | 53 | (17) |
| 1993–1994 | Darmstadt 98 | 0 | (0) |
| 1994–1996 | Politehnica Timișoara | 60 | (29) |
| 1996 | Rapid București | 8 | (0) |
| 1997 | Bohemians Praha | 4 | (0) |
| 1997–1998 | Zadarkomerc Zadar | 0 | (0) |
| 1998–2000 | Politehnica Timișoara | 25 | (7) |
| 2000–2001 | Ruch Chorzów | 3 | (0) |
| 2002–2003 | Corvinul Hunedoara | 31 | (18) |
| 2004 | Olimpia Satu Mare | 13 | (5) |
| 2004–2005 | Unirea Sânnicolau Mare | 11 | (3) |
| 2005–2006 | UTA Arad | 4 | (1) |
| Total | | 212 | (80) |
- * Club domestic league appearances and goals

Marcel Băban (born 16 October 1968) is a Romanian former professional footballer who played as a striker for teams such as Politehnica Timișoara, Rapid București, Corvinul Hunedoara, Darmstadt 98 and Bohemians Praha, among others.

After retirement, in 2010, Băban bought the club from his hometown, FC Jimbolia and transformed it into a football academy, named Marcel Băban Jimbolia. In March 2017, he bought third tier club, Nuova Mama Mia Becicherecu Mic, but due to lack of funding and some financial problems from the past, the club was relegated twice (2017 and 2018) and even if it was spared from relegation in the summer of 2017, the next season was disastrous, finishing last with -14 points and dissolving.

== Personal life ==
His son, Denis Băban, is also a footballer.

== Honours ==
Politehnica Timișoara

- Cupa României runner-up: 1991–92
- Divizia B: 1994–95
