= Roland Nagy =

Romanian footballer and manager

Personal information
- Date of birth: 12 June 1971 (age 55)
- Place of birth: Arad, Romania
- Height: 1.85 m (6 ft 1 in)
- Position: Midfielder

Youth career
- Motorul IMR Arad

Senior career*
Years	Team	Apps	(Gls)
1989–1990	Motorul IMR Arad		
1990–1991	UTA Arad	0	(0)
1992–1994	Brașov	65	(8)
1995–1997	Steaua București	58	(2)
1998–2000	Mainz 05	15	(0)
1999	→ FSV Frankfurt (loan)	22	(2)
2000–2002	Darmstadt 98	37	(3)
2002–2003	UTA Arad	21	(4)
2003–2004	Tricotaje Ineu	13	(0)
Total		231	(19)

Managerial career
- 2006–2007: UTA Arad (assistant)
- 2007: UTA Arad (caretaker)
- 2008: UTA Arad (caretaker)
- 2008–2009: UTA Arad (assistant)
- 2010–2012: UTA Arad
- 2012–2013: Național Sebiș
- 2014–2016: UTA Arad
- 2017–2018: Gloria LT Cermei (technical director)
- 2018–2019: Viitorul Arad (technical director)
- 2019–: Gloria LT Cermei (technical director)
- * Club domestic league appearances and goals

Roland "Roli" Nagy (born 12 June 1971) is a Romanian former professional footballer who played as a midfielder for teams such as: UTA Arad, FC Brașov, Steaua București, Mainz 05, FSV Frankfurt or Darmstadt 98. After retirement Roli Nagy started his football manager career being on several occasions the manager of UTA Arad, but he also managed teams such as Național Sebiș or Gloria Lunca-Teuz Cermei. He is currently the technical director of Gloria Lunca-Teuz Cermei.
