= 1993–94 Divizia A =

76th season of top-tier football league in Romania

Divizia A
- Season: 1993–94
- Champions: Steaua București
- Relegated: Politehnica Timișoara; Dacia Unirea Brăila
- Champions League: Steaua București
- Cup Winners' Cup: Gloria Bistriţa
- UEFA Cup: Universitatea Craiova; Dinamo Bucharest; Rapid București
- Matches played: 306
- Goals scored: 746 (2.44 per match)
- Top goalscorer: Gheorghe Craioveanu (22)
- Biggest home win: Naţional 6–0 Gloria; Steaua 6–0 UTA
- Biggest away win: Naţional 1–5 Rapid; Sportul 0–4 Dinamo
- Highest scoring: Oţelul 6–3 Politehnica
- Longest winning run: Dinamo, Rapid (5)
- Longest unbeaten run: Steaua (12)
- Longest losing run: Sportul, Naţional, Braşov, Electroputere, Dacia, Politehnica, Gloria (4)

The 1993–94 Divizia A was the seventy-sixth season of Divizia A, the top-level football league of Romania.

== Teams ==
Location of teams in 1993-94 Divizia A

== League table ==
Pos	Team	Pld	W	D	L	GF	GA	GD	Pts	Qualification or relegation
1	Steaua București (C)	34	22	9	3	63	19	+44	53	Qualification to Champions League qualifying round
2	FC U Craiova	34	16	8	10	64	46	+18	40	Qualification to UEFA Cup preliminary round
3	Dinamo București	34	16	7	11	65	40	+25	39	Qualification to UEFA Cup first round
4	Rapid București	34	16	6	12	43	32	+11	38	Qualification to UEFA Cup preliminary round
5	Petrolul Ploiești	34	14	10	10	34	30	+4	38	
6	Farul Constanța	34	15	7	12	42	38	+4	37	
7	Gloria Bistrița	34	16	3	15	47	43	+4	35	Qualification to Cup Winners' Cup first round
8	Inter Sibiu	34	13	8	13	40	41	−1	34	
9	Progresul București	34	14	4	16	44	42	+2	32	
10	Ceahlăul Piatra Neamț	34	11	10	13	27	40	−13	32	
11	UTA Arad	34	12	8	14	35	49	−14	32	
12	Universitatea Cluj	34	11	9	14	39	42	−3	31	
13	FC Brașov	34	13	5	16	38	52	−14	31	
14	Electroputere Craiova	34	10	10	14	25	34	−9	30	Invitation to Intertoto Cup
15	Oțelul Galați	34	12	5	17	38	47	−9	29	
16	Sportul Studenţesc București	34	11	7	16	30	45	−15	29	
17	Politehnica Timișoara (R)	34	11	6	17	39	53	−14	28	Relegation to Divizia B
18	Dacia Unirea Brăila (R)	34	9	6	19	33	53	−20	24	Relegation to Divizia B

Source: LT
Rules for classification: 1) points; 2) head-to-head points; 3) head-to-head goal difference; 4) head-to-head goals scored; 5) goal difference; 6) number of goals scored
(C) Champions; (R) Relegated

=== Positions by round ===
Team ╲ Round	1	2	3	4	5	6	7	8	9	10	11	12	13	14	15	16	17	18	19	20	21	22	23	24	25	26	27	28	29	30	31	32	33	34
Brașov	9	10	8	10	12	14	11	13	9	11	11	11	8	10	9	11	10	9	10	9	10	9	7	8	8	8	10	10	11	14	11	14	10	13
Ceahlăul Piatra Neamț	15	12	15	17	16	17	17	18	18	17	18	18	18	18	18	17	17	17	16	17	16	17	15	14	14	14	14	14	13	15	16	13	11	10
Universitatea Craiova	5	2	1	1	1	3	3	2	2	2	2	2	2	2	5	3	3	2	5	3	3	3	3	3	2	2	3	2	3	2	2	2	2	2
Dacia Unirea Brăila	10	14	11	14	7	6	9	10	10	13	12	14	11	8	11	9	11	12	13	14	12	14	14	15	17	17	17	18	18	18	18	18	18	18
Dinamo București	18	15	10	13	9	13	10	11	8	9	4	6	6	5	2	2	2	4	2	2	2	2	2	2	3	3	2	3	2	3	3	3	3	3
Electroputere Craiova	13	17	17	18	17	18	15	12	13	16	14	13	14	14	12	13	14	14	15	15	15	15	16	16	15	15	15	15	16	17	17	15	12	14
Farul Constanța	7	3	3	2	2	1	2	3	3	4	5	4	3	6	3	5	5	5	6	6	7	8	9	7	6	7	7	8	8	7	6	7	7	6
Gloria Bistrița	16	6	13	8	10	7	5	5	4	6	9	12	9	12	10	10	9	6	4	5	6	7	8	9	9	9	8	7	5	6	5	6	6	7
Inter Sibiu	8	5	4	5	4	8	6	6	5	3	3	3	4	3	6	4	6	7	7	8	8	6	4	6	4	5	4	5	7	4	8	8	9	8
Oțelul Galați	14	7	12	6	13	15	16	17	15	18	15	15	15	15	15	16	16	15	14	12	13	12	13	13	13	12	11	11	10	12	10	12	15	15
Petrolul Ploiești	11	13	14	9	14	9	12	8	11	10	7	8	7	7	4	6	4	3	3	4	4	5	6	5	7	4	5	6	4	5	4	4	4	5
Național București	2	4	7	4	6	4	7	9	12	7	10	7	10	9	8	8	8	8	9	7	5	4	5	4	5	6	6	4	6	8	9	9	8	9
Rapid București	17	18	16	15	11	11	14	16	16	14	13	9	12	11	13	14	12	11	11	11	11	11	11	10	10	10	9	9	9	9	7	5	5	4
Sportul Studențesc București	3	8	9	12	15	12	8	7	6	8	6	10	13	13	14	15	15	16	18	18	18	18	18	18	18	18	18	17	17	16	15	17	17	16
Steaua București	1	1	2	3	3	2	1	1	1	1	1	1	1	1	1	1	1	1	1	1	1	1	1	1	1	1	1	1	1	1	1	1	1	1
Politehnica Timișoara	12	16	18	16	18	16	18	15	17	15	17	16	16	16	17	18	18	18	17	16	17	16	17	17	16	16	16	16	15	13	14	16	16	17
Universitatea Cluj	4	11	5	7	8	10	13	14	14	12	16	17	17	17	16	12	13	13	12	13	14	13	12	12	12	11	12	13	14	11	13	11	14	12
UTA Arad	6	9	6	11	5	5	4	4	7	5	8	5	5	4	7	7	7	10	8	10	9	10	10	11	11	13	13	12	12	10	12	10	13	11

Source: LT (in Romanian)

=== Results ===
Home \ Away	BRA	CEA	UCR	DUB	DIN	ELC	FAR	GBI	INT	OȚE	PET	NAT	RAP	SPO	STE	POL	UCL	UTA
Brașov	—	2–0	2–0	2–0	0–0	1–0	0–1	1–0	3–1	4–0	1–1	2–1	0–2	1–0	0–1	1–3	2–1	3–0
Ceahlăul Piatra Neamț	2–1	—	1–4	4–2	2–1	0–0	1–0	1–0	0–0	1–0	0–0	0–2	2–0	1–1	1–1	2–0	1–1	2–0
Universitatea Craiova	6–2	3–0	—	5–0	3–2	0–0	1–2	2–0	0–0	1–0	0–1	2–1	3–1	1–2	3–1	1–0	3–0	4–1
Dacia Unirea Brăila	0–0	0–0	1–1	—	1–0	3–0	1–0	2–4	2–0	1–0	2–1	4–0	0–0	2–1	2–5	0–3	0–0	2–0
Dinamo București	6–1	4–0	2–3	2–0	—	4–2	2–1	2–0	4–1	3–1	3–1	2–0	3–1	0–0	0–3	4–1	4–1	5–2
Electroputere Craiova	0–1	0–0	2–2	1–0	2–2	—	0–1	2–1	1–0	5–1	0–0	1–0	1–0	1–0	0–0	0–0	2–0	1–1
Farul Constanța	0–1	2–0	1–1	2–1	2–1	3–1	—	1–0	2–3	0–3	0–0	3–0	2–1	4–0	1–1	3–1	3–0	1–1
Gloria Bistrița	2–1	2–0	3–2	3–0	1–1	1–0	3–1	—	2–0	1–0	2–1	1–0	1–2	5–0	0–1	4–0	1–0	3–1
Inter Sibiu	4–1	3–1	2–2	2–0	1–0	2–0	0–0	2–0	—	1–0	1–1	2–0	2–0	1–2	0–2	2–1	3–2	3–1
Oțelul Galați	1–0	0–1	3–1	4–3	2–0	1–0	2–0	1–1	1–1	—	4–0	1–0	1–1	3–1	0–1	6–3	1–1	0–0
Petrolul Ploiești	3–0	2–0	2–1	1–0	0–1	1–0	2–0	2–0	0–0	2–0	—	2–0	1–0	1–1	1–1	1–0	1–0	3–0
Național București	1–1	0–0	5–2	2–1	3–0	3–0	2–3	6–0	2–0	3–0	1–0	—	1–5	2–0	0–3	1–0	0–0	1–0
Rapid București	2–1	0–1	3–1	0–0	0–0	0–1	3–0	1–2	2–0	1–0	3–0	2–2	—	1–0	2–1	1–0	2–1	3–1
Sportul Studențesc București	3–2	2–1	0–1	2–1	0–4	0–1	1–0	2–0	1–0	0–1	1–1	0–2	0–1	—	0–0	4–0	2–0	2–1
Steaua București	2–0	2–0	1–1	2–0	1–0	2–0	0–0	2–1	4–1	2–1	4–0	3–0	0–0	3–1	—	2–0	2–0	6–0
Politehnica Timișoara	0–0	2–0	1–2	2–1	2–2	2–0	4–1	2–0	2–1	4–0	1–1	0–3	0–2	0–0	2–2	—	1–0	1–0
Universitatea Cluj	5–1	2–1	3–1	2–1	1–1	0–0	1–1	3–2	1–0	2–0	1–0	1–0	2–0	1–1	1–2	5–1	—	1–2
UTA Arad	4–0	1–1	1–1	2–0	1–0	2–1	0–1	1–1	1–1	2–0	2–1	1–0	2–1	2–0	1–0	1–0	0–0	—

Source: LT (in Romanian)
Legend: Blue = home team win; Yellow = draw; Red = away team win.

== Top goalscorers ==
Position	Player	Club	Goals
1	Gheorghe Craioveanu	FC U Craiova	22
2	Ilie Dumitrescu	Steaua București	17
3	Marian Ivan	Brașov	16
3	Ilie Lazăr	Gloria Bistriţa	16
5	Adrian Ungur	UTA Arad	15

== Champion squad ==
Steaua București

Goalkeepers: Daniel Gherasim (8 / 0); Dumitru Stângaciu (32 / 0).
Defenders: Tiberiu Csik (7 / 0); Aurel Panait (22 / 2); Bogdan Bucur (9 / 1); Iulian Filipescu (21 / 0); Ionel Pârvu (29 / 3); Anton Doboș (34 / 0); Daniel Prodan (27 / 2); Sorin Marian Tufan (11 / 0).
Midfielders: Constantin Gâlcă (33 / 2); Basarab Panduru (30 / 8); Ilie Stan (28 / 7); Daniel Iftodi (11 / 3); Ionel Fulga (13 / 2); Horia Codorean (1 / 1).
Forwards: Viorel Ion (24 / 5); Ilie Dumitrescu (25 / 17); Ion Vlădoiu (14 / 1); Adrian Ilie (23 / 3); Remus Daniel Safta (2 / 0); Marius Lăcătuș (17 / 5); Laurențiu Roșu (4 / 0).
(league appearances and goals listed in brackets)

Manager: Emerich Jenei.
