= 1991–92 Cupa României =

Tournament details
- Country: Romania

Final positions
- Champions: Steaua București
- Runners-up: Politehnica Timişoara

The 1991–92 Cupa României was the 54th edition of Romania's most prestigious football cup competition.

The title was won by Steaua București against Politehnica Timişoara.

== Format ==
The competition is an annual knockout tournament.

First round proper matches are played on the ground of the lowest ranked team, then from the second round proper the matches are played on a neutral location.

If a match is drawn after 90 minutes, the game goes in extra time, if the scored is still tight after 120 minutes, then the winner will be established at penalty kicks.

In the quarter-finals and semi-finals, each tie is played as a two legs.

From the first edition, the teams from Divizia A entered in competition in sixteen finals, rule which remained till today.

== First round proper ==
Team 1	Score	Team 2
1 March 1992
Unirea Alba Iulia (Div. B)	0–0 (a.e.t.) (4–2 p)	(Div. A) Argeş Piteşti
Foresta Brebu (Div. D)	1–3	(Div. A) Dinamo București
Progresul București (Div. B)	1–1 (a.e.t.) (5–6 p)	(Div. A) Rapid București
Sportul Studentesc București (Div. A)	4–0	(Div. A) FC Bacau
Viscofil București (Div. C)	1–3	(Div. A) Electroputere Craiova
Dunărea Călărași (Div. C)	3–2	(Div. A) Gloria Bistrița
Constructorul Craiova (Div. C)	0–1	(Div. A) FC U Craiova
Unirea Dej (Div. C)	0–4	(Div. A) Steaua București
Corvinul Hunedoara (Div. A)	3–2	(Div. A) FC Brașov
Steaua Mecanică Huşi (Div. C)	1–2	(Div. A) Petrolul Ploiești
Minerul Mătăsari (Div. C)	0–2	(Div. A) ASA 1962 Târgu Mureș
Gaz Metan Mediaș (Div. B)	0–5	(Div. A) Farul Constanța
Ceahlăul Piatra Neamț (Div. B)	0–2	(Div. A) Oțelul Galați
Unirea Seini (Div. D)	0–1 (a.e.t.)	(Div. A) Politehnica Timişoara
CFR Timișoara (Div. B)	2–2 (a.e.t.) (7–6 p)	(Div. A) Inter Sibiu
Mureșul Toplița (Div. C)	0–1	(Div. A) Dacia Unirea Brăila

== Second round proper ==
Team 1	Score	Team 2
11 March 1992
Oțelul Galați	1–1 (a.e.t.) (6–7 p)	CFR Timișoara
Dinamo București	0–1 (a.e.t.)	Sportul Studenţesc București
Rapid București	0–1	Dacia Unirea Brăila
Politehnica Timișoara	2–0	Electroputere Craiova
FC U Craiova	2–1	Petrolul Ploiești
ASA 1962 Târgu Mureș	1–2	Dunărea Călărași
Unirea Alba Iulia	0–3	Steaua București
Corvinul Hunedoara	1–4	Farul Constanța

== Quarter-finals ==
The matches were played on 26 March and 15 April 1992.

Team 1	Agg.	Team 2	1st leg	2nd leg
Dacia Unirea Brăila	1–2	FC U Craiova	1–0	0–2
Steaua București	6–0	Sportul Studenţesc București	3–0	3–0
Dunărea Călărași	1–2	Politehnica Timișoara	1–0	0–2
Farul Constanța	5–2	CFR Timișoara	4–1	1–1

== Semi-finals ==
The matches were played on 27 May and 3 June 1992.

Team 1	Agg.	Team 2	1st leg	2nd leg
Steaua București	5–4	FC U Craiova	3–1	2–3
Politehnica Timișoara	2–0	Farul Constanța	1–0	1–0

== Final ==
24 June 1992
17:00 EET

Steaua București	1–1 (a.e.t.)	Politehnica Timişoara
Andraşi 14'	Report	Băban 20'
Penalties
Stan (penalty scored); Vlădoiu (penalty scored); Andraşi (penalty scored); Bucur (penalty missed)	3–2	(penalty scored) Varga; (penalty scored) Roşu; (penalty missed) Băban; (penalty missed) Stoicov; (penalty missed) Crăciun

Stadionul Regie, Bucharest
Attendance: 8,000
Referee: Adrian Porumboiu (Romania)
