= 1996 Cupa României final =

- Event: 1995–96 Cupa României
Steaua București	Gloria Bistriţa
Divizia A	Divizia A
3	1
- Date: 28 April 1996
- Venue: Stadionul Naţional, Bucharest
- Referee: Adrian Porumboiu (Romania)
- Attendance: 25,000

The 1996 Cupa României final was the 58th final of Romania's most prestigious cup competition. The final was played at the Stadionul Naţional in Bucharest on 28 April 1996 and was contested between Divizia A sides Steaua București and Gloria Bistriţa. The cup was won by Steaua.

== Route to the final ==
FC Steaua București

Round of 32	Petrolistul Boldeşti	0–3	Steaua București
Round of 16	Steaua București	3–0	Petrolul Stoina
Quarter-finals	Dinamo București	0–1	Steaua București
Semi-finals	Steaua București	4–1	Inter Sibiu

CF Gloria Bistriţa

Round of 32	Gloria IRIS Corneşti	0–1	Gloria Bistriţa
Round of 16	Gloria Bistriţa	3–1	Armatura Zalău
Quarter-finals	Gloria Bistriţa	2–1	Farul Constanţa
Semi-finals	Gloria Bistriţa	2–0	Naţional București

== Match details ==
28 April 1996
18:00 EEST

Steaua București	3–1	Gloria Bistriţa
Ilie 59'; Bucur 77'; Gâlcă 89'	Report	Miszti 44'

Stadionul Naţional, Bucharest
Attendance: 25,000
Referee: Adrian Porumboiu (Romania)

Steaua București	Gloria Bistriţa

STEAUA BUCUREŞTI:
GK	23	(Romania) Bogdan Stelea
RB	2	(Romania) Tiberiu Csik		(substituted off) 52'
CB	6	(Romania) Daniel Prodan
CB	4	(Romania) Anton Doboş
LB	3	(Romania) Ionel Pârvu
RM	11	(Romania) Iulian Filipescu
DM	5	(Romania) Constantin Gâlcă
AM	8	(Romania) Narcis Răducan		(substituted off) 70'
LM	10	(Romania) Laurenţiu Roşu		(substituted off) 56'
FW	7	(Romania) Marius Lăcătuş (c)
FW	9	(Romania) Ion Vlădoiu
Substitutes:
FW	16	(Romania) Sabin Ilie	(red card) 67'	(substituted in) 59'
MF	15	(Romania) Roland Nagy		(substituted in) 56'
FW	14	(Romania) Bogdan Bucur		(substituted in) 70'
Manager:
(Romania) Dumitru Dumitriu

GLORIA BISTRIŢA:
GK	1	(Romania) Costel Câmpeanu (c)
DF	7	(Romania) Ioan Miszti
DF	5	(Romania) Gabriel Cristea
DF	6	(Romania) Simion Mironaş
DF	3	(Romania) Valer Săsărman		(substituted off) 79'
DF	4	(Romania) Emil Dăncuş
MF	2	(Romania) Eugen Voica		(substituted off) 59'
MF	8	(Romania) Dorel Purdea
MF	10	(Romania) Daniel Iftodi		(substituted off) 81'
FW	9	(Romania) Ilie Lazăr
FW	11	(Romania) Dănuţ Matei
Substitutes:
MF	13	(Romania) Marian Năstase	(red card) 75'	(substituted in) 59'
MF	14	(Romania) Dumitru Halostă		(substituted in) 79'
FW	15	(Romania) Marius Raduţă		(substituted in) 81'
Manager:
(Romania) Remus Vlad and Ion Balaur

MATCH OFFICIALS

- Assistant referees:
  - (Romania) Patriţiu Abrudan
  - (Romania) Nicolae Grigorescu
- Fourth official:

MAN OF THE MATCH

MATCH RULES

- 90 minutes.
- 30 minutes extra-time (15-minute intervals)
- Penalty shoot-out if scores level after extra time.
- Seven named substitutes
- Maximum of 3 substitutions.
