= Dorel Zegrean =

Romanian footballer (born 1969)

Personal information
- Full name: Dorel Ioan Zegrean
- Date of birth: 4 December 1969 (age 56)
- Place of birth: Mărișelu, Romania
- Height: 1.73 m (5 ft 8 in)
- Position: Right-back

Youth career
- Viitorul Bistrița
- Mecanica Bistrița

Senior career*
Years	Team	Apps	(Gls)
1989–1995	Gloria Bistrița	123	(12)
1995–1997	Național București	37	(2)
1997–2000	Fortuna Sittard	68	(1)
2000–2002	BFC Dynamo	18	(1)
2002–2003	Gloria Bistrița	3	(0)
Total		249	(16)

International career
1991	Romania U21	1	(0)
1994–1995	Romania B	2	(0)
1994–1995	Romania	3	(0)
- * Club domestic league appearances and goals

Dorel Ioan Zegrean (born 4 December 1969) is a Romanian former professional footballer who played as a right-back.

== Club career ==
Zegrean was born on 4 December 1969 in Mărișelu, Romania. He played junior-level football at Viitorul Bistrița and later for neighboring club Mecanica. He began playing senior football at Gloria Bistrița during the 1989–90 Divizia B season, at the end of which the team earned first-league promotion. Subsequently, Zegrean made his Divizia A debut on 13 March 1991 under coach Remus Vlad in Gloria's 2–0 away loss to Argeș Pitești. He began playing in European competitions during the 1993–94 UEFA Cup, appearing in both legs of the 2–0 aggregate loss to Maribor in the first round. In the same season, the team reached the Cupa României final, where Zegrean played the entire match under coach Constantin Cârstea in the 1–0 victory against Universitatea Craiova. He started the following season by playing the entire match in the 1–0 loss to Steaua București in the 1994 Supercupa României. Afterwards, he played in both matches in the first round of the 1994–95 Cup Winners' Cup, where they won the first leg 2–1 against Real Zaragoza but lost the second 4–0.

In 1995, Zegrean went to play for Național București. He helped them eliminate Partizan Belgrade and Chornomorets Odesa in the early rounds of the 1996–97 UEFA Cup. The team also reached the 1997 Cupa României final, with Zegrean being a starter under coach Florin Halagian before being replaced by Tinel Petre in the 60th minute as Național lost 4–2 to Steaua. During his two-season spell with The Bankers, they finished as league runners-up both years.

In 1997, Zegrean went to play for Fortuna Sittard where he became teammates with compatriots Alin Bănceu and Cosmin Mariș, and a young Mark van Bommel. He made his Eredivisie debut on 19 August 1997 under coach Pim Verbeek in a 4–1 away loss to Twente. On 23 March 1998, he scored his first goal in the competition in a 3–1 home win over Utrecht. Subsequently, he played four games in the 1998 Intertoto Cup. The team reached the 1998–99 KNVB Cup final, but coach Bert van Marwijk did not use him in the 2–0 loss to Ajax.

In 2000, Zegrean joined German fourth-tier side BFC Dynamo, where he became teammates with fellow Romanians Florin Bătrânu, Aurel Panait, Dănuț Oprea and Silvian Cristescu. The team won the 2000–01 NOFV-Oberliga Nord and then played a two-legged promotion play-off, losing 5–2 on aggregate to 1. FC Magdeburg. In 2002, Zegrean returned to Gloria Bistrița and played in a 1–0 away loss to Lille in the Intertoto Cup. He made his last Divizia A appearance on 23 November 2002 in a 3–0 loss to Ceahlăul Piatra Neamț, totaling 163 matches with 14 goals in the competition.

== International career ==
In 1991, Zegrean made one appearance for Romania's under-21 team in a 1–1 draw against Israel. Subsequently, he played for Romania B in a 1–0 loss to Argentina and a 2–2 draw against Brazil.

Zegrean played three friendly games for Romania, making his debut on 16 February 1994 under coach Anghel Iordănescu in a 2–1 away loss to South Korea. On 8 February 1995, he played in a 1–0 loss to Greece. His last appearance for the national team took place one week later in a 1–1 draw against Turkey.

== Personal life ==
His daughter, Bianca, is a handball player.

== Honours ==
Gloria Bistrița

- Divizia B: 1989–90
- Cupa României: 1993–94
- Supercupa României runner-up: 1994

Național București

- Divizia A runner-up: 1995–96, 1996–97
- Cupa României runner-up: 1996–97

Fortuna Sittard

- KNVB Cup runner-up: 1998–99

BFC Dynamo

- NOFV-Oberliga Nord: 2000–01
