= Valer Săsărman =

Romanian footballer (1969–2021)

Personal information
- Date of birth: 25 August 1969
- Place of birth: Braniștea, Romania
- Date of death: 29 August 2021 (aged 52)
- Place of death: Măluț, Romania
- Height: 1.87 m (6 ft 2 in)
- Position: Defender

Youth career
- 1985–1986: Laminorul Beclean

Senior career*
Years	Team	Apps	(Gls)
1986–1988	Laminorul Beclean		
1988–2001	Gloria Bistrița (Note: The statistics for the 1988–89 and 1989–90 Divizia B seasons are unavailable.)	329	(7)
Total		329	(7)

International career
1990–1991	Romania U21	15	(0)
1990	Romania Olympic	1	(0)
1991	Romania B	1	(0)

Managerial career
- 2001–2002: Someșul Gaz Beclean (youth)
- 2002–2005: Someșul Gaz Beclean
- 2008–2009: Gloria Bistrița (youth)
- 2009–2010: Voința Mărișelu
- 2013–2014: Gloria II Bistrița
- 2014: Gloria Bistrița (assistant)
- 2014–2015: Gloria Bistrița
- 2015–2016: Gloria Bistrița (youth)
- 2017: FC Bistrița
- 2017–2021: 1. FC Gloria (youth)
- * Club domestic league appearances and goals

Valer Săsărman (25 August 1969 – 29 August 2021) was a Romanian professional footballer who played as a defender. Săsărman started his career at Laminorul Beclean, but played for the rest of it for Gloria Bistrița, appearing in 329 Divizia A matches and scoring seven goals. After retirement, Săsărman worked as a coach at both youth and senior level.

== Club career ==
Săsărman was born on 25 August 1969 in Braniștea, Romania and began playing junior-level football in 1985 for Laminorul Beclean. He began playing for the club's senior squad in 1986 in Divizia C. In 1988, he joined Divizia B club Gloria Bistrița, helping them gain promotion to the first league at the end of the 1989–90 season. He made his Divizia A debut on 12 August 1990 under coach Remus Vlad in a 0–0 draw against Argeș Pitești. Săsărman spent 13 seasons with Gloria and helped the team win the 1993–94 Cupa României, as coach Constantin Cârstea used him the full 90 minutes in the 1–0 win over Universitatea Craiova in the final. Subsequently, he played the entire match under Cârstea in the 1994 Supercupa României, as they were defeated 1–0 by Steaua București. Săsărman helped Gloria reach another Cupa României final in 1996 where he played as a starter under Remus Vlad in the 3–1 loss to Steaua. During his time with Gloria, Săsărman also made 10 appearances in European competitions (including three in the Intertoto Cup). Notably, he played in a 2–1 win over Real Zaragoza in the 1994–95 Cup Winners' Cup and a 1–1 draw against Gabriel Batistuta's Fiorentina in the 1996–97 Cup Winners' Cup. In his last four years of his career, he was the team's captain as Costel Câmpeanu left the club. Săsărman has a total of 329 matches with seven goals in Divizia A, all of them for Gloria.

== International career ==
From 1990 to 1991, Săsărman was consistently featured for Romania's under-21, Olympic and B sides.

== Managerial career ==
After he ended his playing career, Săsărman started coaching juniors in 2001 at Someșul Gaz Beclean. One year later, he became the head coach of Someșul's senior team in Divizia C, leading them until 2005. In 2008, he went back to coaching juniors for one year at Gloria Bistrița. Afterwards, Săsărman went to coach Voința Mărișelu in the fourth league. From 2013 to 2014, he led Gloria II Bistrița. In January 2014, he became assistant coach for the club's main squad in the third division and in September that year he became its head coach until 2015. Between 2015 and 2016, Săsărman coached juniors once again at Gloria. Afterwards, he was head coach at fourth-tier club FC Bistrița. From 2017 to 2021, he worked as a youth coach at 1. FC Gloria.

== Death ==
Săsărman died on 29 August 2021, after suffering a stroke at his home in Măluț, Bistrița-Năsăud County.

== Honours ==
Gloria Bistrița

- Divizia B: 1989–90
- Cupa României: 1993–94, runner-up 1995–96
- Supercupa României runner-up: 1994
