= Costel Câmpeanu =

Romanian footballer

Personal information
- Date of birth: 14 May 1965 (age 61)
- Place of birth: Bacău, Romania
- Height: 1.90 m (6 ft 3 in)
- Position: Goalkeeper

Senior career*
Years	Team	Apps	(Gls)
1986–1987	Viitorul Gheorgheni		
1987–1989	SC Bacău	48	(0)
1989–1991	Dinamo București	19	(0)
1992	Gloria Bistrița	27	(0)
1993	Progresul București	9	(0)
1993–1994	Ceahlăul Piatra Neamț	23	(0)
1994–2005	Gloria Bistrița	342	(0)
1999	→ Ceahlăul Piatra Neamț (loan)	0	(0)
2005–2006	Aerostar Bacău		
Total		468	(0)

Managerial career
- 2005–2006: Aerostar Bacău
- 2008–2009: Pambac Bacău
- 2010: FCM Onești
- * Club domestic league appearances and goals as of 28 September 2008

Costel Câmpeanu (born 14 May 1965 in Bacău) is a former Romanian football player and coach.

== Playing career ==
Câmpeanu was born on 14 May 1965 in Bacău and began playing football in the 1986–87 Divizia C season at Viitorul Gheorgheni. Afterwards he went to play for his hometown team, SC Bacău where on 26 August 1987 he made his Divizia A debut under coach Nicolae Vătafu in a 4–2 away loss to Argeș Pitești. After two years he went to play for Dinamo București where in his first season he helped the club win The Double, being used by coach Mircea Lucescu in 10 league games, as the team's first-choice goalkeeper was Bogdan Stelea. In the 1991–92 season, Dinamo won another title, but Câmpeanu played only one game in the league, having to leave after the first half of the season to play for Gloria Bistrița, as he had a conflict with coach Florin Halagian. After one year spent at Gloria, he went for half a year to Progresul București, then moved for one year at Ceahlăul Piatra Neamț.

In 1994, Câmpeanu went to play again for Gloria, spending a total of 11 seasons with the club this time, also captaining the team. He played the entire match under coach Constantin Cârstea in the 1994 Supercupa României, as they were defeated 1–0 by Steaua București. Subsequently, he helped Gloria reach the 1996 Cupa României final where he played the full 90 minutes under coach Remus Vlad in the 3–1 loss to Steaua. He also achieved notable results in European competitions such as a 2–1 win over Real Zaragoza in the 1994–95 Cup Winners' Cup, a 1–1 draw against Gabriel Batistuta's Fiorentina in the 1996–97 Cup Winners' Cup and another 1–1 draw against Brescia in the 2003 Intertoto Cup. During his time with The Blue Vampires, the team was heavily involved in match fixing under the club's influential president Jean Pădureanu, and Câmpeanu had to intentionally make mistakes to concede goals, years later stating in interviews that he regrets doing so.

In 1999, he returned for a short spell at Ceahlăul where the head coach was Viorel Hizo, whom he had known from their time together at Dinamo, where Hizo was Halagian's assistant coach. Câmpeanu played in Ceahlăul's 1999 Intertoto Cup campaign which included a 1–1 draw against Juventus. Câmpeanu's last spell as a player was at Aerostar Bacău in the 2005–06 Divizia C season when he was 40 years old. Throughout his career he earned a total of 470 Divizia A appearances and 25 in European competitions (including 19 in the Intertoto Cup), being nicknamed Burebista, after the first king of Dacia because of his career longevity. On 13 May 2020, Gazeta Sporturilor included him in a first XI of best Romanian players who never played for Romania's national team.

== Coaching career ==
Câmpeanu coached Aerostar Bacău, Pambac Bacău and FCM Onești in the Romanian lower leagues.

== Honours ==
=== Player ===
Dinamo București

- Divizia A: 1989–90, 1991–92
- Cupa României: 1989–90

Gloria Bistrița

- Supercupa României runner-up: 1994
- Cupa României runner-up: 1995–96
