= Bogdan Stelea =

Romanian footballer (born 1967)

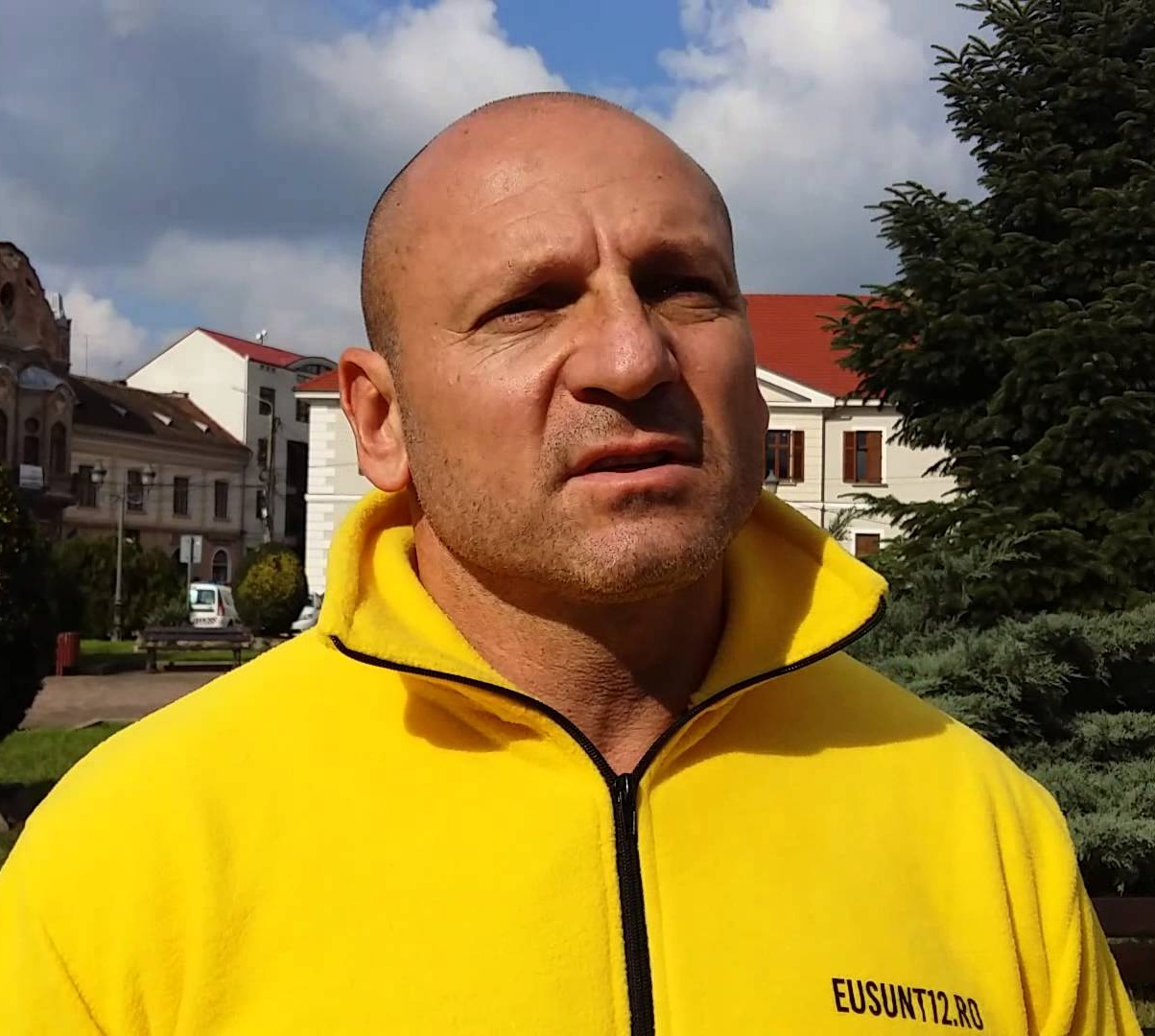
- Stelea in 2015

Personal information
- Full name: Bogdan Gheorghe Stelea
- Date of birth: 5 December 1967 (age 58)
- Place of birth: Bucharest, Romania
- Height: 1.88 m (6 ft 2 in)
- Position: Goalkeeper

Youth career
- 1980–1986: Dinamo București

Senior career*
Years	Team	Apps	(Gls)
1986–1991	Dinamo București	98	(0)
1987	→ Politehnica Iași (loan)	0	(0)
1992–1993	Mallorca	52	(0)
1993–1994	Standard Liège	3	(0)
1994	Rapid București	13	(0)
1994–1995	Samsunspor	29	(0)
1995–1997	Steaua București	47	(0)
1997–2004	Salamanca	183	(0)
2002	→ Rapid București (loan)	10	(0)
2004–2005	Dinamo București	13	(0)
2005	Akratitos	14	(0)
2006	Oțelul Galați	0	(0)
2006–2008	Unirea Urziceni	37	(0)
2008–2009	FC Brașov	23	(0)
Total		522	(0)

International career
1988–2005	Romania	91	(0)

Managerial career
- 2009–2011: Romania (assistant)
- 2012: Astra Ploiești
- 2013–2014: Romania U21
- 2014: Viitorul Constanța
- * Club domestic league appearances and goals

Bogdan Gheorghe Stelea (Romanian pronunciation: [boɡˈdan ˈstele̯a]; born 5 December 1967) is a Romanian former professional footballer who played as a goalkeeper.

He played professionally into his 40s, featuring for all three major Liga I clubs in his country's capital. A significant part of his career was spent in Spain, mainly with Salamanca. Additionally, Stelea made nearly 100 appearances for Romania, representing the nation in three World Cups and two European Championships.

== Club career ==
Stelea was born on 5 December 1967 in Bucharest, Romania and began playing football at age 12 when he was brought to the youth center of Dinamo București by boxing coach Dumitru Ion. There, he worked with Iosif Varga, and also during these years he was teammates with future national team competitor Florin Prunea. He made his Liga I debut on 20 November 1986, playing for Dinamo under the guidance of coach Mircea Lucescu in a 2–0 victory against Oțelul Galați. However, shortly afterwards he was sent on loan for the second half of the season to Politehnica Iași, where he did not make any appearances.

Stelea returned under Lucescu's command at Dinamo and became the first-choice goalkeeper in 1988, replacing Dumitru Moraru. His first achievement was reaching the quarter-finals of the 1988–89 European Cup Winners' Cup where they were eliminated on the away goals rule after 1–1 on aggregate by Sampdoria; he conceded only two goals in six games and kept four clean sheets. In the following season he helped the club win The Double, playing 22 league matches, and appearing the entire match in the 6–4 win over rivals Steaua București in the Cupa României final. He also played eight matches in the 1989–90 European Cup Winners' Cup campaign when the team reached the semi-finals where they were eliminated after losing 2–0 on aggregate to Anderlecht; he conceded five goals and kept three clean sheets.

While he was in a training camp before a game in the 1990–91 European Cup against Porto, Stelea was nicknamed Arnold by Corneliu Vadim Tudor who visited them, because his haircut looked similar to Arnold Schwarzenegger's in the movie Red Heat. In the 1991–92 season he was used by coach Florin Halagian in 11 league games as The Red Dogs won the championship undefeated. They also eliminated Luis Figo's Sporting Lisbon in the UEFA Cup with a 2–1 aggregate victory. However, he did not finish the season with them, as he was transferred late in 1991 to Mallorca for €300,000.

Stelea made his La Liga debut under coach Lorenzo Serra Ferrer in a 2–0 away loss to Real Madrid, and one of the goals conceded was scored by his compatriot Gheorghe Hagi. After two seasons in Spain, with relegation in his first, he joined Belgium's Standard Liège where he was teammates with fellow Romanian Mircea Rednic. His debut in the Belgian First Division took place on 4 December 1993 under coach René Vandereycken in a 2–0 home win over KSV Waregem. Stelea also played in the first half of the 3–0 loss to Anderlecht in the 1993 Belgian Super Cup, being replaced by Gilbert Bodart for the second half. Because he did not play much for Standard and risked not being selected for Romania's 1994 World Cup squad, he returned home to play for half a year at Rapid București. After he participated in the World Cup, Stelea spent one year in Turkey at Samsunspor alongside compatriots Marius Cheregi and Daniel Timofte, being brought there by coach Gheorghe Mulțescu as first choice goalkeeper. He managed to keep a clean sheet in his Turkish league debut on 14 August 1994 in a 0–0 away draw against Kocaelispor.

In 1995, Stelea joined Steaua București for a two-year spell under coach Dumitru Dumitriu. His first performance there was keeping a clean sheet in a 2–0 victory against Petrolul Ploiești in the 1995 Supercupa României. In the 1995–96 season, he made 25 league appearances and played in the 3–1 win over Gloria Bistrița in the Cupa României final, as the team won The Double. In the following season, Stelea played 22 league matches and appeared in the 4–2 victory over Național București in the Cupa României final, helping Steaua win another Double. He also played 11 games in the Champions League group stage over the course of these two seasons. During this time he also had a successful trial with Sunderland, but the transfer ultimately failed to materialize.

In 1997, Stelea was transferred to UD Salamanca for €900,000, where he experienced his steadiest period, remaining with the team for seven years. However, this period was interrupted by a small loan spell at Rapid with whom he played under coach Mircea Rednic in the 2–1 victory against Dinamo in the 2002 Cupa României final. He appeared in 191 overall games for Los Charros during his tenure while competing mainly in the second division, but spent his first two seasons in the top flight. During these years, the club earned the nickname "Salamanca Rumana" as Stelea played alongside fellow Romanians Cătălin Munteanu, Lucian Marinescu and Gabriel Popescu, building upon the earlier tenure of Ovidiu Stîngă. His performances in 1998 earned him the fourth place in the Romanian Footballer of the Year award. In 2004, Stelea returned to Dinamo, helping the club win the 2004–05 Cupa României, being used by coach Ioan Andone in the final where he kept a clean sheet in the 1–0 victory against Farul Constanța. In 2005 he was brought to Greece to Akratitos together with Lucian Marinescu by his former national team colleague Ilie Dumitrescu, who was the coach. His debut in the Alpha Ethniki took place on 28 August 2005 in a 3–1 home win over Iraklis.

In 2006, Stelea returned to Romania and signed with Oțelul Galați, where he spent half a season, but did not feature in any matches because of an injury. The following campaign he moved to Unirea Urziceni for two seasons, being coached by his former national team colleague Dan Petrescu, but he became first choice only in the second season. He played for Unirea in the 2008 Cupa României final, which was lost 2–1 to CFR Cluj. Stelea finally ended his 23-year-long career at age 41 by the end of the 2008–09 season, playing 23 matches under coach Răzvan Lucescu at FC Brașov, managing not to concede any goals for 707 consecutive minutes. He kept a clean sheet in his last Romanian top-flight match on 10 June 2009, a 1–0 victory over Politehnica Timișoara that brought his career total in the competition to 241 matches.

== International career ==
=== Early years and 1990 World Cup ===
Stelea played 91 games for Romania in which he conceded 72 goals, making his debut on 23 November 1988 when coach Emerich Jenei sent him to replace Silviu Lung for the last 20 minutes of a 3–0 friendly victory against Israel. His second game was a 1–0 victory against Bulgaria in the successful 1990 World Cup qualifiers. He was selected by coach Jenei to be part of the final tournament squad, but did not play in any games.

=== 1994 World Cup and Euro 1996 ===
After playing one match during the Euro 1992 qualifiers, Stelea made six appearances in the successful 1994 World Cup qualifiers. He was part of the "Golden Generation" that reached the quarter-finals of the 1994 World Cup final tournament, but was used by coach Anghel Iordănescu in only two group stage games, a 3–1 victory against Colombia and a 4–1 loss to Switzerland. Florin Prunea was chosen to play in the other three games of the campaign. Stelea played 10 games during the successful Euro 1996 qualifiers. Subsequently, he played under Iordănescu in two 1–0 losses to France and Bulgaria in the final tournament, as his side failed to progress from their group.

=== 1998 World Cup and Euro 2000 ===
Stelea played eight games in the successful 1998 World Cup qualifiers. Afterwards he was used by Iordănescu in all four games during the final tournament as the team reached the round of 16 where they were eliminated after a 1–0 loss to Croatia. He went on to play seven matches during the successful Euro 2000 qualifiers. Then he played under Jenei in all four games in the final tournament as they reached the quarter-finals where they were defeated with 2–1 by Italy.

=== Final years ===
Stelea played seven games during the 2002 World Cup qualifiers, including the lost play-off to Slovenia. In his final years, he made one appearance in the Euro 2004 qualifiers in a 3–0 victory against Bosnia and Herzegovina. He also was the team's captain for the first and only time in a 2006 World Cup qualifier 1–1 draw against Armenia in which he had a highly appreciated performance. He made his final appearance for the national team on 9 February 2005 in a 2–2 friendly draw against Slovakia.

For representing his country during 1990–2000 at the World and European Cups final tournaments, Stelea was decorated by President of Romania Traian Băsescu on 25 March 2008 with the Ordinul "Meritul Sportiv" – (The Medal "The Sportive Merit") class III.

=== Controversies ===
On 3 June 1998, during a friendly against Paraguay, played at the Ghencea stadium, Stelea was booed by the fans after conceding a goal by Roberto Acuña and in response he made some obscene gestures towards them. He later stated that he had a moment of weakness because his child was very sick in the hospital at that time. In 2001, he had a fight with the striker Ionel Ganea in a training session that occurred before a Romania – Italy game.

== Managerial career ==
Stelea started his coaching career in 2009, when he worked as an assistant for Romania's national team under Răzvan Lucescu, who had been his coach at his last club, FC Brașov. On 6 June 2012, Stelea became head coach of Astra Ploiești, but two months later, following a home draw against CS Turnu Severin, he was sacked and replaced with Gheorghe Mulțescu. Afterwards he went to coach for a year Romania's under-21 national team from 2013 until 2014. In June 2014, Stelea accepted an offer from his former national team colleague Gheorghe Hagi to coach his club Viitorul Constanța, but resigned after not obtaining any victory in the first four rounds of the season.

== Personal life ==
His son, Bogdan Stelea Jr., was also a footballer who played as a defender and spent his career in the lower leagues of Romania, playing for teams such as FC Snagov and Chindia Târgoviște.

In 1994, Stelea was named Honorary Citizen of Bucharest.

== Career statistics ==
=== Club ===
Appearances and goals by club, season and competition
Club	Season	League			National cup (Note: Includes Cupa României, Copa del Rey, Belgian Cup, Turkish Cup, Greek Cup)		Continental		Other (Note: Includes Supercupa României, Belgian Super Cup)		Total	
Club	Season	Division	Apps	Goals	Apps	Goals	Apps	Goals	Apps	Goals	Apps	Goals
Dinamo București	1986–87	Divizia A	1	0	0	0	0	0	—		1	0
Dinamo București	1987–88	Divizia A	9	0	1	0	0	0	—		10	0
Dinamo București	1988–89	Divizia A	29	0	3	0	6 (Note: Appearances in UEFA Cup Winners' Cup)	0	—		38	0
Dinamo București	1989–90	Divizia A	22	0	3	0	8	0	—		33	0
Dinamo București	1990–91	Divizia A	26	0	3	0	4 (Note: Appearances in UEFA European Cup)	0	—		33	0
Dinamo București	1991–92	Divizia A	11	0	0	0	4 (Note: Appearances in UEFA Cup)	0	—		15	0
Dinamo București	Total		98	0	10	0	22	0	—		130	0
Politehnica Iași (loan)	1986–87	Divizia B	0	0	0	0	—		—		0	0
Mallorca	1991–92	La Liga	27	0	0	0	—		—		27	0
Mallorca	1992–93	Segunda División	25	0	4	0	—		—		29	0
Mallorca	1993–94	Segunda División	0	0	1	0	—		—		0	0
Mallorca	Total		52	0	5	0	—		—		57	0
Standard Liège	1993–94	Belgian First Division	3	0	0	0	0	0	1	0	4	0
Rapid București (loan)	1993–94	Divizia A	13	0	—		—		—		13	0
Samsunspor	1994–95	1.Lig	29	0	4	0	—		—		33	0
Steaua București	1995–96	Divizia A	25	0	3	0	8 (Note: Appearances in UEFA Champions League)	0	1	0	37	0
Steaua București	1996–97	Divizia A	22	0	3	0	5	0	—		30	0
Steaua București	Total		47	0	6	0	13	0	—		67	0
Salamanca	1997–98	La Liga	30	0	2	0	—		—		32	0
Salamanca	1998–99	La Liga	33	0	2	0	—		—		35	0
Salamanca	1999–00	Segunda División	28	0	0	0	—		—		28	0
Salamanca	2000–01	Segunda División	14	0	4	0	—		—		18	0
Salamanca	2001–02	Segunda División	4	0	0	0	—		—		4	0
Salamanca	2002–03	Segunda División	36	0	0	0	—		—		36	0
Salamanca	2003–04	Segunda División	38	0	0	0	—		—		38	0
Salamanca	Total		183	0	8	0	—		—		191	0
Rapid București (loan)	2001–02	Divizia A	10	0	2	0	—		—		12	0
Dinamo București	2004–05	Divizia A	13	0	5	0	0	0	—		18	0
Akratitos	2005–06	Alpha Ethniki	14	0	2	0	—		—		16	0
Oțelul Galați	2005–06	Divizia A	0	0	—		—		—		0	0
Unirea Urziceni	2006–07	Liga I	9	0	1	0	—		—		10	0
Unirea Urziceni	2007–08	Liga I	28	0	4	0	—		—		32	0
Unirea Urziceni	Total		37	0	5	0	—		—		42	0
FC Brașov	2008–09	Liga I	23	0	1	0	—		—		24	0
Career total			522	0	48	0	35	0	2	0	607	0

=== International ===
Appearances and goals by national team and year
National team	Year	Apps	Goals
Romania	1988	1	0
Romania	1989	1	0
Romania	1990	4	0
Romania	1991	1	0
Romania	1992	6	0
Romania	1993	1	0
Romania	1994	11	0
Romania	1995	6	0
Romania	1996	6	0
Romania	1997	7	0
Romania	1998	12	0
Romania	1999	7	0
Romania	2000	9	0
Romania	2001	8	0
Romania	2002	4	0
Romania	2003	2	0
Romania	2004	4	0
Romania	2005	1	0
Total		91	0

== Honours ==
Dinamo București

- Divizia A: 1989–90, 1991–92
- Cupa României: 1989–90, 2004–05

Standard Liège

- Belgian Super Cup runner-up: 1993

Steaua București

- Divizia A: 1995–96, 1996–97
- Cupa României: 1995–96, 1996–97
- Supercupa României: 1995

Rapid București

- Cupa României: 2001–02

Unirea Urziceni

- Cupa României runner-up: 2007–08

Individual

- Romanian Footballer of the Year (fourth place): 1998
