= 1994 Cupa României final =

- Event: 1993–94 Cupa României
Gloria Bistriţa	Universitatea Craiova
Divizia A	Divizia A
1	0
- Date: 30 April 1994
- Venue: Stadionul Regie, Bucharest
- Referee: Adrian Porumboiu (Romania)
- Attendance: 7,000

The 1994 Cupa României final was the 56th final of Romania's most prestigious cup competition. The final was played at the Stadionul Regie in Bucharest on 30 April 1994 and was contested between Divizia A sides Gloria Bistriţa and Universitatea Craiova. The cup was won by Gloria Bistriţa.

== Route to the final ==
ACF Gloria Bistriţa

Round of 32	Gloria Reşiţa	1–3	Gloria Bistriţa
Round of 16	Gloria Bistriţa	5–0	Petrolul Berca
Quarter-finals	Poiana Câmpina	0–3	Gloria Bistriţa
Semi-finals	Universitatea CLuj	1–4	Gloria Bistriţa

Universitatea Craiova

Round of 32	Energia Iernut	0–2	Universitatea Craiova
Round of 16	Farul Constanţa	0–5	Universitatea Craiova
Quarter-finals	FC Selena Bacău	0–2	Universitatea Craiova
Semi-finals	Universitatea Craiova	1–0	Argeş Piteşti

== Match details ==
30 April 1994
17:00 EEST

Gloria Bistriţa	1–0	Universitatea Craiova
Ilea 26'	Report

Stadionul Regie, Bucharest
Attendance: 7,000
Referee: Adrian Porumboiu (Romania)

Gloria Bistriţa	Universitatea Craiova

GLORIA BISTRIŢA:
GK	1	(Romania) Florin Tene
DF	2	(Romania) Dorel Zegrean
DF	5	(Romania) Gabriel Cristea
DF	4	(Romania) Mircea Dumitriu	(substituted off) 78'
DF	3	(Romania) Valer Săsărman
MF	6	(Romania) Simion Mironaş
MF	8	(Romania) Ion Balaur	(substituted off) 75'
MF	10	(Romania) Marius Răduţă
MF	7	(Romania) Cornel Sevastiţa
FW	11	(Romania) Florin Stancu
FW	9	(Romania) Nicolae Ilea
Substitutes:
MF	14	(Romania) Dumitru Halostă	(substituted on) 75'
DF	15	(Romania) Cristian Alexandru	(substituted on) 78'
Manager:
(Romania) Constantin Cârstea

UNIVERSITATEA CRAIOVA:
GK	1	(Romania) Dorin Arcanu
DF	2	(Romania) Daniel Mogoşanu
DF	3	(Romania) Ion Sburlea
DF	5	(Romania) Gheorghe Biță
DF	7	(Romania) Remus Ganea	(substituted off) 78'
MF	4	(Romania) Cristian Vasc
MF	6	(Romania) Corneliu Papură
MF	10	(Romania) Ovidiu Stîngă
MF	11	(Romania) Silvian Cristescu	(substituted off) 35'
FW	8	(Romania) Gheorghe Craioveanu
FW	9	(Romania) Ionel Gane
Substitutes:
MF	16	(Romania) Augustin Călin	(substituted on) 35'
FW	17	(Romania) Nicolae Zamfir	(substituted on) 78'
Manager:
(Romania) Marian Bondrea

MATCH OFFICIALS

- Assistant referees:
  - (Romania) Ilie Coţ
  - (Romania) Nicolae Grigorescu
- Fourth official:

MAN OF THE MATCH

MATCH RULES

- 90 minutes.
- 30 minutes extra-time (15-minute intervals)
- Penalty shoot-out if scores level after extra time.
- Seven named substitutes
- Maximum of 3 substitutions.
