= Adrian Ilie =

Romanian footballer (born 1974)

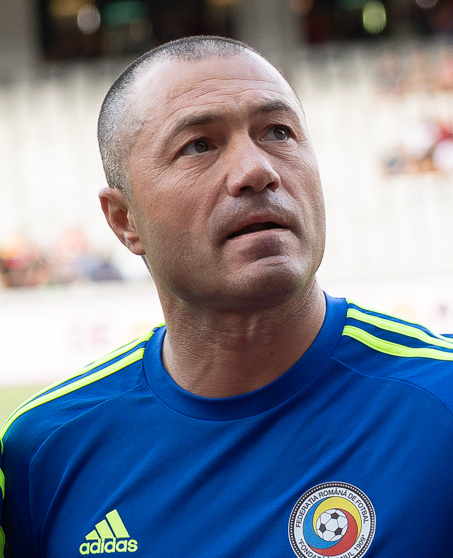
- Ilie in 2018

Personal information
- Full name: Bucurel Adrian Ilie
- Date of birth: 20 April 1974 (age 52)
- Place of birth: Craiova, Romania
- Height: 1.80 m (5 ft 11 in)
- Position: Forward

Youth career
- –1992: CSȘ Craiova

Senior career*
Years	Team	Apps	(Gls)
1992–1993	Electroputere Craiova	31	(12)
1993–1996	Steaua București	85	(28)
1996–1997	Galatasaray	30	(12)
1998–2002	Valencia	84	(29)
2002–2004	Alavés	22	(6)
2004	→ Beşiktaş (loan)	13	(6)
2004–2005	Zürich	23	(7)
Total		287	(100)

International career
1992–1995	Romania U21	17	(21)
1993–2005	Romania	55	(13)

Managerial career
- 2007: Steaua București (sporting director)
- * Club domestic league appearances and goals

Bucurel Adrian Ilie (born 20 April 1974) is a Romanian former professional footballer who played as a forward.

Nicknamed The Cobra, he is best known for his spell with Valencia in Spain.

He played for the Romania national team in one World Cup and two European Championships.

== Club career ==
Ilie began his career with his local club Electroputere Craiova before transferring to Romania's biggest club Steaua Bucuresti in 1993. During his three years with Steaua, Ilie helped the club to three consecutive Romanian league titles and the 1995–96 Cupa României.

In 1996, Ilie was purchased by Turkish side Galatasaray for an amount of €2.35 million, where he won the Turkish championship in 1996–97. After an impressive season, he moved from Galatasaray to Valencia CF for a reported US$ 7 million, where he replaced in the squad the Brazilian star Romário and took over his no. 11 jersey. At Valencia he impressed from his debut, scoring twelve goals in 17 matches, and thus getting the nickname of "Cobra" from coach Claudio Ranieri, because he was as "lethal as a cobra". At the Mestalla, Ilie made a remarkable attacking duo together with teammate Claudio López, helping Los Che to win the 1998–99 Copa del Rey. In 2000, under Héctor Cúper's command, Valencia reached the final of the UEFA Champions League, where Ilie appeared as a substitute for Gerardo in a 3–0 loss to Real Madrid CF. Two years later, Ilie was a member of Rafael Benítez's 2001–02 La Liga winning squad, scoring only two goals in 10 matches because of injuries.

In 2002, Ilie left Valencia to join Deportivo Alavés but the club was relegated to the Segunda División in his only season. He then returned to Turkey to play for Beşiktaş J.K. before transferring to Switzerland's FC Zürich a year later. In 2005, he signed with Belgian side Beerschot AC but never played with the club due to a severe ankle injury, resulting in his retirement from football in 2006, at the age of only 31.

However, in 2009, he decided to come back into professional football after some discussions with Russian club FC Terek Grozny but he had to quit after failing his medical tests.

== International career ==
At the international level, Ilie won 55 caps for Romania, scoring 13 goals. He played at the 1996 European Football Championship, 1998 FIFA World Cup and 2000 European Football Championship. At 1998 FIFA World Cup, he scored against Colombia one of the most spectacular goals of the tournament. In the period between 1997 and 2000, alongside teammate Gheorghe Hagi, he was Romania's national team leader, scoring important goals and impressing with his skills. In 1998, he won the title of Romania's footballer of the year.

== Personal life ==
He is the older brother of fellow footballer Sabin Ilie.

== Career statistics ==
=== Club ===
Appearances and goals by club, season and competition
Club	Season	League			Cup		Supercup		Continental		Total	
Club	Season	Division	Apps	Goals	Apps	Goals	Apps	Goals	Apps	Goals	Apps	Goals
Electroputere Craiova	1991–92	Divizia A	1	0			—		—		1	0
Electroputere Craiova	1992–93	Divizia A	30	12			—		1	0	31	12
Electroputere Craiova	Total		31	12					1	0	32	12
Steaua București	1993–94	Divizia A	23	3		0	—		4	0	27	3
Steaua București	1994–95	Divizia A	28	11			1	0	6	3	35	14
Steaua București	1995–96	Divizia A	24	13			—		7	2	31	14
Steaua București	1996–97	Divizia A	10	1			—		5	5	15	6
Steaua București	Total		85	28			1	0	22	10	108	38
Galatasaray	1996–97	1.Lig	18	6			1	0	—		19	6
Galatasaray	1997–98	1.Lig	12	6			—		7	5	19	11
Galatasaray	Total		30	12			1	0	7	5	38	17
Valencia	1997–98	La Liga	17	12	3	1	—		—		20	13
Valencia	1998–99	La Liga	24	10	4	0	—		5	2	33	12
Valencia	1999–00	La Liga	22	5	1	0	1	0	12	3	36	8
Valencia	2000–01	La Liga	10	0	1	0	—		2	0	13	0
Valencia	2001–02	La Liga	10	2	0	0	—		3	3	13	5
Valencia	Total		83	29	9	1	1	0	22	8	115	38
Alavés	2002–03	La Liga	22	6	1	0	—		2	0	25	6
Beşiktaş (loan)	2003–04	Süper Lig	13	6			—		2	0	15	6
Zürich	2004–05	Swiss Super League	23	7	4	4	—		—		27	11
Career total			287	100	14	5	3	0	56	23	360	128

=== International ===
National team	Year	Apps	Goals
Romania	1993	1	0
Romania	1996	9	1
Romania	1997	6	1
Romania	1998	11	6
Romania	1999	6	2
Romania	2000	5	1
Romania	2001	9	2
Romania	2002	4	0
Romania	2003	2	0
Romania	2005	2	0
Total		55	13

Romania score listed first, score column indicates score after each Ilie goal.

List of international goals scored by Adrian Ilie
No.	Date	Venue	Opponent	Score	Result	Competition
1	14 August 1996	Stadionul Steaua, Bucharest, Romania	Israel	1–0	2–0	Friendly
2	30 April 1997	Stadionul Steaua, Bucharest, Romania	Republic of Ireland	1–0	1–0	1998 FIFA World Cup qualification
3	3 June 1998	Stadionul Steaua, Bucharest, Romania	Paraguay	1–0	3–2	Friendly
4	3 June 1998	Stadionul Steaua, Bucharest, Romania	Paraguay	2–1	3–2	Friendly
5	15 June 1998	Stade de Gerland, Lyon, France	Colombia	1–0	1–0	1998 FIFA World Cup Group G
6	2 September 1998	Stadionul Steaua, Bucharest, Romania	Liechtenstein	3-0	7–0	UEFA Euro 2000 qualifying
7	2 September 1998	Stadionul Steaua, Bucharest, Romania	Liechtenstein	4–0	7–0	UEFA Euro 2000 qualifying
8	2 September 1998	Stadionul Steaua, Bucharest, Romania	Liechtenstein	5–0	7–0	UEFA Euro 2000 qualifying
9	5 June 1999	Stadionul Steaua, Bucharest, Romania	Hungary	1–0	2–0	UEFA Euro 2000 qualifying
10	4 September 1999	Tehelné pole, Bratislava, Slovakia	Slovakia	0–1	1–5	UEFA Euro 2000 qualifying
11	16 August 2000	Stadionul Cotroceni, Bucharest, Romania	Poland	1–0	1–1	Friendly
12	6 June 2001	Darius and Girėnas Stadium, Kaunas, Lithuania,	Lithuania	0–1	1–2	2002 FIFA World Cup qualification
13	5 September 2001	Népstadion, Budapest, Hungary	Hungary	0–1	0–2	2002 FIFA World Cup qualification

== Honours ==
Steaua București

- Divizia A: 1993–94, 1994–95, 1995–96
- Cupa României: 1995–96
- Supercupa României: 1994, 1995

Galatasaray

- 1.Lig: 1996–97
- Turkish Super Cup: 1997

Valencia

- La Liga: 2001–02
- Copa del Rey: 1998–99
- Supercopa de España: 1999
- UEFA Intertoto Cup: 1998
- UEFA Champions League runner-up: 1999–2000, 2000–01

Zürich

- Swiss Cup: 2004–05

Individual

- Gazeta Sporturilor Romanian Footballer of the Year: 1998
