= Nicolae Ilea =

Romanian footballer

Personal information
- Full name: Nicolae Cornel Ilea
- Date of birth: 29 November 1969 (age 56)
- Place of birth: Satu Mare, Romania
- Height: 1.83 m (6 ft 0 in)
- Position: Striker

Senior career*
Years	Team	Apps	(Gls)
1989–1991	Olimpia Satu Mare		
1991–1992	Universitatea Cluj	28	(16)
1992–1994	Gloria Bistrița	59	(7)
1994–1999	Debrecen	152	(66)
1999–2000	MTK Hungaria	10	(3)
2000	Videoton	9	(2)
2001	Nyíregyháza	10	(2)
2001–2002	Olimpia Satu Mare	8	(2)
2002–2006	Oașul Negrești (Note: The statistics for the 2002–03 and 2005–06 Divizia C seasons are unavailable.)	51	(15)
Total		327	(113)
- * Club domestic league appearances and goals

Nicolae Cornel Ilea (born 29 November 1969) is a retired Romanian football striker. He scored the only goal of the 1994 Cupa României final against FC Universitatea Craiova, which helped Gloria Bistrița win the first trophy in the club's history.

== Honours ==
Universitatea Cluj

- Divizia B: 1991–92

Gloria Bistrița

- Cupa României: 1993–94

Debrecen

- Magyar Kupa: 1998–99
