= Negrean =

Negrean is a Romanian surname. Notable people with the surname include:

- Sandu Negrean (born 1947), Romanian footballer player
- Tiberiu Negrean (born 1988), Romanian water polo player
