= Hințești oil field =

Oil field in Argeș County, Romania

Hinţeşti
- Country: Romania
- Region: Argeș County
- Offshore/onshore: onshore
- Operator: Petrom

Field history
- Discovery: 1984
- Start of production: 1985

Production
- Current production of oil: 800 barrels per day (~40,000 t/a)
- Estimated oil in place: 13.8 million tonnes (~ 16.34×10^{6} m^{3} or 102.8 million bbl)

The Hinţeşti oil field is an oil field located in Moșoaia, Argeș County. It was discovered in 1984 and developed by Petrom. It began production in 1985 and produces oil and natural gas. The total proven reserves of the Hinţeşti oil field are around 102.8 million barrels (13.8 million tonnes), and production is centered on 800 barrels per day (130 m^{3}/d).
