= Alin Bănceu =

Romanian footballer

Personal information
- Full name: Alin Gheorghe Bănceu
- Date of birth: 30 December 1973 (age 52)
- Place of birth: Mediaș, Romania
- Height: 1.89 m (6 ft 2 in)
- Positions: Left back; left midfielder; central defender

Youth career
- Universitatea Cluj

Senior career*
Years	Team	Apps	(Gls)
1992–1993	Universitatea Cluj	2	(0)
1993–1994	CFR Cluj	33	(2)
1994–1997	Universitatea Cluj	84	(2)
1997–1999	Fortuna Sittard	7	(0)
1999–2001	Național București	16	(0)
2001–2002	Ceahlăul Piatra Neamț	12	(1)
2002–2003	Fermana	15	(0)
Total		169	(5)

International career
1995	Romania U21	3	(0)
1996	Romania B	1	(0)
- * Club domestic league appearances and goals

Alin Gheorghe Bănceu (born 30 December 1973) is a Romanian former footballer who played as a defender and midfielder.

== Club career ==
Bănceu was born on 30 December 1973 in Mediaș, Romania. He played junior-level football at Universitatea Cluj. He made his Divizia A debut on 4 October 1992 under coach Remus Vlad in "U" Cluj's 2–0 away victory against CSM Reșița. Subsequently, he spent the 1993–94 season at Divizia B club CFR Cluj. Bănceu returned to Universitatea, where he made four appearances in the 1995 Intertoto Cup.

In 1997, Bănceu and his teammate, Cosmin Mariș, were transferred together from "U" Cluj to Fortuna Sittard. There, they became teammates with their compatriot Dorel Zegrean and a young Mark van Bommel. During a friendly against Genk, Bănceu was kicked in the groin by an opponent and was transported to a hospital where he had one testicle removed. He made his Eredivisie debut on 23 September 1997 when Bert van Marwijk sent him in the 82nd minute to replace Patrick Paauwe in a 3–2 away loss to PSV Eindhoven. Over the course of two seasons, Bănceu made only seven league appearances for Fortuna due to a serious injury to his right leg.

In 1999, Bănceu returned to Romania for a two-season spell at Național București. For the 2001–02 season, he joined Ceahlăul Piatra Neamț and made his final Divizia A appearances, totaling 114 matches with three goals in the competition. He ended his career in 2003, after playing one season for Serie C club Fermana.

== International career ==
In 1995, Bănceu made three appearances for Romania's under-21 team, including victories over Azerbaijan and Israel, and a 0–0 draw against France. The following year, he played for Romania B in a 3–1 loss to Egypt.

== After retirement ==
After his playing career ended, Bănceu worked for a while as a general manager at Universitatea Cluj.
