= Sandu Negrean =

Romanian footballer (born 1974)

Personal information
- Date of birth: 25 November 1974 (age 51)
- Place of birth: Năsăud, Romania
- Height: 1.70 m (5 ft 7 in)
- Position: Forward

Youth career
- Metalurgistul Cluj-Napoca

Senior career*
Years	Team	Apps	(Gls)
1997–1999	Olimpia Gherla		
1999	Arieșul Turda		
2000–2002	Baia Mare (Note: The statistics for the 1999–2000 Divizia C season are unavailable.)	58	(30)
2002–2006	Gloria Bistrița	117	(34)
2007	Universitatea Cluj	25	(0)
2008–2009	Gloria Bistriţa	24	(0)
Total		224	(64)

Managerial career
- 2009–2013: Gloria Bistrița (assistant)
- 2013–2014: Gloria Bistrița
- 2014: Gloria Bistrița (assistant)
- * Club domestic league appearances and goals as of 27 February 2018

Sandu Negrean (born 25 November 1974) is a Romanian former football forward. In his career, Negrean played for teams such as Olimpia Gherla, Arieșul Turda, Baia Mare, Gloria Bistrița and Universitatea Cluj. His best period was his first spell at Gloria where he scored 34 goals in 117 Divizia A matches. After retirement, he started a career in coaching and worked for Gloria as both an assistant and head coach.

== Playing career ==
Negrean was born on 25 November 1974 in Năsăud, Romania and began playing junior-level football at Metalurgistul Cluj-Napoca. He began playing at senior level in 1997 at Divizia C club Olimpia Gherla. In the middle of the 1998–99 season, he went to play for Arieșul Turda. In 1999, he joined Baia Mare, helping them achieve promotion to Divizia B at the end of his first season. In the following two seasons he scored a total of 30 goals, as the club finished in second place in each season.

In 2002, Negrean went to play for Gloria Bistrița where he formed an offensive partnership with Cristian Coroian. He made his Divizia A debut on 17 August 2002 under coach Remus Vlad in a 0–0 draw against Farul Constanța. One week later, he scored his first goal in a 3–0 home win over Sportul Studențesc București. Until the end of the 2002–03 season, Negrean netted seven goals, including a brace in a 2–0 victory against Astra Ploiești, to help Gloria finish in third place. In the 2004–05 season, he scored a career-best nine goals in the first division, which included a double in a 4–3 win over Universitatea Craiova. During his years spent at Gloria, Negrean also made 13 appearances with three goals scored in the Intertoto Cup over the course of four seasons. Notably, he netted a hat-trick to help his side eliminate Olympiakos Nicosia and reach the second round of the 2002 edition where they were defeated by Slaven Belupo.

In the middle of the 2006–07 season, Negrean joined second tier club Universitatea Cluj where he was wanted by coach Adrian Falub. He helped them gain promotion to the first league at the end of the season. After playing the first half of the 2007–08 season for "U" Cluj, he returned to Gloria Bistrița. There, he made his last Liga I appearance on 29 May 2009 in a 3–1 win over CS Otopeni, totaling 154 matches with 34 goals in the competition.

== Managerial career ==
In 2009, Negrean was appointed to Sandu Tăbârcă's coaching staff at Gloria Bistrița. In July 2013, Negrean became the head coach of the team, partnering with his former colleague in the forward line of Gloria from his playing days, Cristian Coroian, who was the technical director. In March 2014, Coroian became the team's head coach and Negrean worked as his assistant. They both left the club in September 2014 due to the poor conditions at the club.

== Controversy ==
In December 2007, Negrean lost control of his vehicle and hit seven parked cars while having an alcohol concentration of 0.83 mg per liter of exhaled air.

== Personal life ==
His son, Alexandru, was also a footballer.

== Honours ==
Baia Mare

- Divizia C: 1999–2000

Universitatea Cluj

- Divizia B: 2006–07
