= Dealu Viilor =

Dealu Viilor may refer to several places in Romania:

- Dealu Viilor, a village in Moșoaia Commune, Argeș County
- Dealu Viilor, a village in Poiana Lacului Commune, Argeș County
- Dealu Viilor, a village in Cătunele Commune, Gorj County
