= Cristian Coroian =

Romanian footballer & manager (born 1973)

Personal information
- Full name: Cristian Ambrozie Coroian
- Date of birth: 14 March 1973 (age 53)
- Place of birth: Gherla, Romania
- Height: 1.84 m (6 ft 0 in)
- Position: Forward

Senior career*
| Years | Team | Apps | (Gls) |
| 1993–1996 | CFR Cluj (Note: The statistics for the 1993–94 Divizia B season are unavailable.) | 67 | (40) |
| 1996 | Universitatea Cluj | 17 | (6) |
| 1997–1998 | Național București | 18 | (0) |
| 1998–2005 | Gloria Bistrița | 183 | (40) |
| 2005–2007 | CFR Cluj | 56 | (17) |
| 2007–2011 | Gloria Bistrița | 91 | (23) |
| Total | | 432 | (126) |

Managerial career
- 2009–2013: Gloria Bistrița (assistant)
- 2013: FCM Târgu Mureș (assistant)
- 2013: FCM Târgu Mureș (caretaker)
- 2013–2014: Gloria Bistrița (technical director)
- 2014: Gloria Bistrița
- 2014–2015: Metalurgistul Cugir
- * Club domestic league appearances and goals as of 27 February 2018

Cristian Ambrozie Coroian (born 14 March 1973) is a retired Romanian footballer and manager. He played as a forward and spent most of his career with CFR Cluj and Gloria Bistrița.

== Playing career ==
Coroian was born on 14 March 1973 in Gherla, Romania and began playing senior-level football at Divizia B club CFR Cluj in 1993. The team suffered relegation at the end of the 1994–95 season, but Coroian stayed with the club, helping it get promoted back after one year by scoring 31 goals. Subsequently, he joined Universitatea Cluj, where he made his Divizia A debut under coach Dan Anca on 31 July 1996 in a 2–2 draw against Rapid București. In the middle of the 1996–97 season, he moved to Național București, helping the team finish runner-up in the championship. The team also reached the 1997 Cupa României final, but coach Florin Halagian did not use him in the 4–2 loss to Steaua București. He also played in a 1–0 loss to Kocaelispor in the first round of the 1997–98 UEFA Cup Winners' Cup.

In 1998, Coroian went to play for Gloria Bistrița. There, beginning in 2002, he formed an offensive partnership with Sandu Negrean. Coroian spent seven seasons with the club, helping them secure a third place in the 2002–03 season and he netted 13 goals in the 2004–05 season. He also played 12 matches and scored three goals in the Intertoto Cup over the course of four seasons. Notably, Coroian scored a brace to help his side eliminate Teuta and reach the third round of the 2002 edition where they were defeated by Lille, and he also played in a 1–1 draw against Brescia during the 2003 edition.

In 2005, Coroian returned to CFR Cluj. Under coach Dorinel Munteanu, he played seven games in the 2005 Intertoto Cup campaign as CFR got past Athletic Bilbao, Saint-Étienne and Žalgiris, scoring two goals —one against each of the last two— with the team reaching the final where they were defeated 4–2 on aggregate by Lens. Afterwards, he scored 11 goals to help CFR earn a third place in the 2006–07 season.

Coroian made a comeback to Gloria Bistrița in 2007. He played five matches under coach Ioan Sabău in the 2007 Intertoto Cup, helping the team eliminate Grbalj against whom he scored a goal, and Maccabi Haifa. The team reached the final, earning a 2–1 home victory against Atlético Madrid, but lost the second leg with 1–0, thus losing the final on the away goals rule. In October 2007, during a match against Universitatea Craiova, Coroian was kicked in the back by the opposing goalkeeper, Mircea Bornescu, who struck him with his studs, resulting in four fractured ribs for Coroian and a six-match suspension for Bornescu. Coroian made his last Liga I appearance on 4 December 2010 in Gloria's 3–3 draw against Politehnica Timișoara, totaling 365 matches with 86 goals in the competition.

On 13 May 2020, Gazeta Sporturilor included him on a list of best Romanian players who never played for Romania's national team.

== Managerial career ==
In 2009, Coroian became assistant coach of Gloria Bistrița, a position he held until 2013. In April 2013, Coroian had his first experience as head coach, as he became the caretaker of Liga II club FCM Târgu Mureș, after previously working for them as an assistant. He was sacked at the end of the season, being replaced by Edward Iordănescu. In July 2013, Coroian became the technical director of Gloria Bistrița, partnering with his former colleague in the forward line of Gloria from his playing days, Sandu Negrean, who was the head coach. In March 2014, Coroian became the team's head coach and Negrean worked as his assistant. They both left the club in September 2014 due to the poor conditions at the club.

In October 2014, Coroian was hired as manager of Liga III club Metalurgistul Cugir and had a good first season, finishing in second place. However, on 22 July 2015, during a training session, he suffered a stroke that left him with lasting health complications, forcing him to retire from his career as a football manager. On 8 July 2017, in an event organized by CFR Cluj, a charity match was played at Dr. Constantin Rădulescu Stadium between CFR and Gloria Bistriţa old boys teams. The teams included former colleagues of Coroian, such as Adrian Anca, Dorinel Munteanu, Cristian Panin and Cosmin Tilincă (CFR); Ovidiu Maier, Sandu Negrean and Valer Săsărman (Gloria).

== Honours ==
CFR Cluj

- Divizia C: 1995–96
- Intertoto Cup runner-up: 2005

Național București

- Divizia A runner-up: 1996–97
- Cupa României runner-up: 1996–97

Gloria Bistrița

- Intertoto Cup runner-up: 2007
