= Braniștea, Bistrița-Năsăud =

Braniștea Árpástó
- Commune
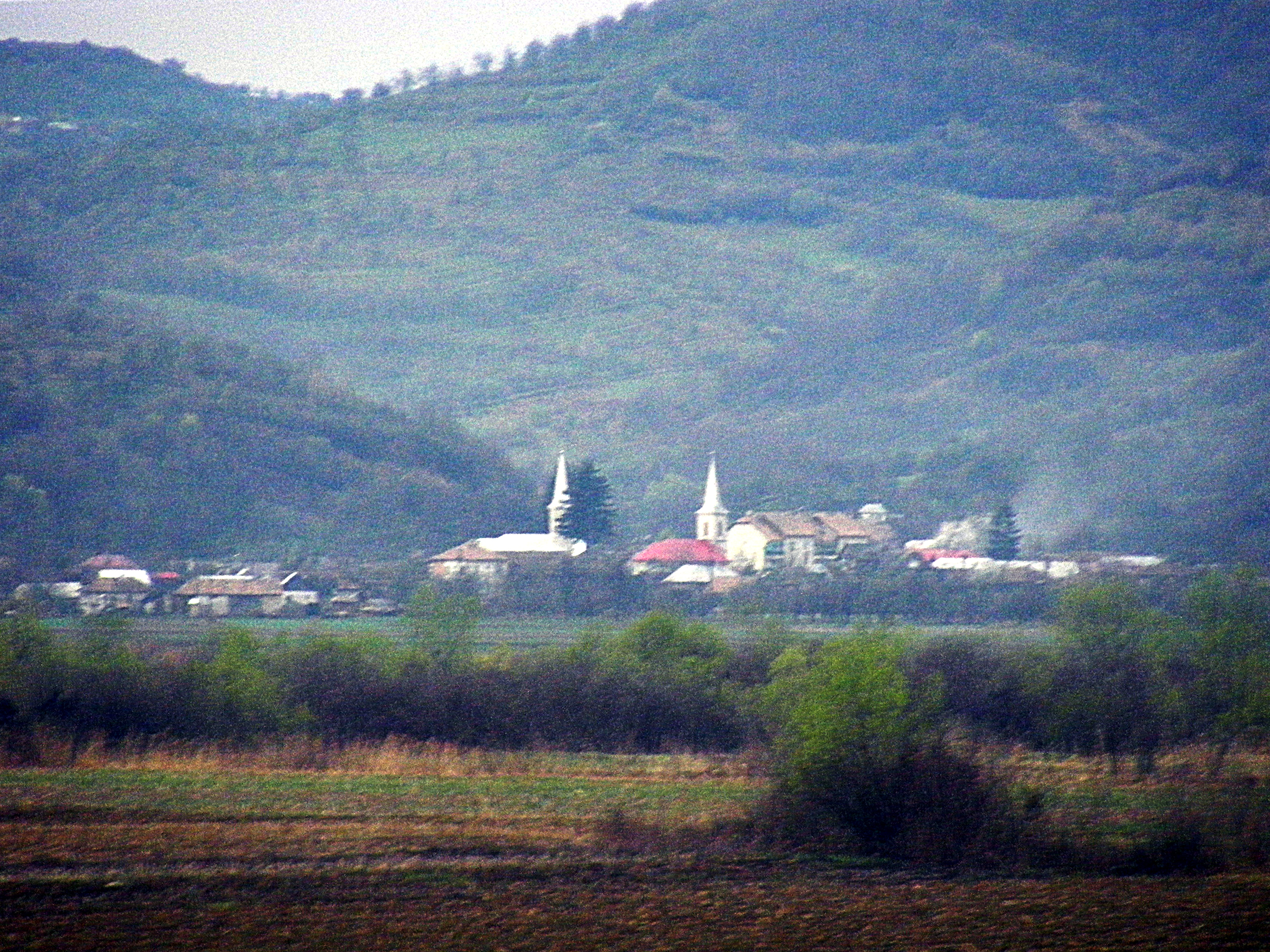
- View of Braniștea village

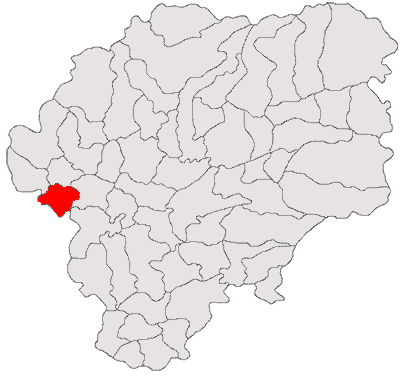
- Location in Bistrița-Năsăud County

- Location in Romania
- Coordinates: 47°10′22″N 24°3′55″E
- Country: Romania
- County: Bistrița-Năsăud

Government
  - Mayor (2020–2024): Tamás Martonos (UDMR)
- Area: 41.64 km^{2} (16.08 sq mi)
- Elevation: 245 m (804 ft)
- Population (2021-12-01): 2,780
  - Density: 66.8/km^{2} (173/sq mi)
- Time zone: UTC+02:00 (EET)
  - Summer (DST): UTC+03:00 (EEST)
- Postal code: 427010
- Area code: +(40) 263
- Vehicle reg.: BN
- Website: branisteabn.ro

Braniștea (Hungarian: Árpástó) is a commune in Bistrița-Năsăud County, Transylvania, Romania. It is composed of three villages: Braniștea, Cireșoaia (formerly Dicea; Magyardécse; German: Bellsdorf) and Măluț (Omlásalja).

== Geography ==
The commune lies on the Transylvanian Plateau, on the left bank of the Someșul Mare River. It is located in the western part of the county, on the border with Cluj County, at a distance of 9 km (5.6 mi) from the town of Beclean and 40 km (25 mi) from the county seat, Bistrița; the city of Dej is 17 km (11 mi) to the west, in Cluj County.

Braniștea borders Unguraș village to the south, Sânmărghita village to the west, Reteag and Uriu villages to the north, Cristeștii Ciceului and Coldău villages to the northeast, the town of Beclean to the east, and Rusul de Jos and Malin villages to the southeast.

== Demographics ==
At the 2021 census, Braniștea had a population of 2,780; of those, 55.94% were Hungarians and 37.55% Romanians. At the 2011 census, the commune had 3,047 inhabitants, of which 62.7% were Hungarians and 37.1% Romanians. At the 2002 census, 60.6% were Reformed, 34.6% Romanian Orthodox, 2.4% Seventh-day Adventist, and 1.1% Pentecostal.

== Natives ==
- Victor Mureșan (1881–1951), priest, delegate at the Great National Assembly of Alba Iulia of December 1, 1918
- Valer Săsărman (1969–2021), footballer
