= Mircea Bornescu =

Romanian former footballer

Personal information
- Full name: Mircea Alexandru Bornescu
- Date of birth: 3 May 1980 (age 46)
- Place of birth: Bucharest, Romania
- Height: 1.87 m (6 ft 2 in)
- Position: Goalkeeper

Youth career
- 1986–1991: Mecanică Fină București
- 1991–1999: Național București

Senior career*
Years	Team	Apps	(Gls)
1999–2000	Juventus București	21	(0)
2000–2002	Apulum Alba Iulia	36	(0)
2002–2005	FC Caracal	74	(7)
2005–2009	Universitatea Craiova	123	(6)
2009–2011	Rapid București	44	(0)
2011	Kavala	0	(0)
2011	Petrolul Ploiești	5	(0)
2012	Universitatea Cluj	14	(0)
2012–2014	Petrolul Ploiești	32	(0)
2014–2015	Rapid București	14	(0)
2016–2017	Voluntari	24	(0)
Total		387	(13)

International career
1998	Romania U18	6	(0)
1998	Romania U21	1	(0)

Managerial career
- 2021: FC U Craiova (team manager)
- * Club domestic league appearances and goals

Mircea Bornescu (born 3 May 1980 in Bucharest) is a Romanian former footballer who played as a goalkeeper.

== Club career ==
=== Early career ===
Bornescu was born on 3 May 1980 in Bucharest, Romania and began playing junior-level football in 1986 at local club Mecanică Fină. In 1991, he joined the junior center of Național București. He started his senior career at Juventus București during the 1999–2000 Divizia B season. In 2001, he moved to Apulum Alba Iulia for one year before joining Extensiv Craiova. There, Bornescu scored his first goal on his birthday, after he was encouraged by coach Nicolae Ungureanu to execute a penalty awarded to his side. Afterwards, he became the main penalty taker, scoring another six goals throughout the 2004–05 season when the club changed its name from Extensiv Craiova to FC Caracal.

=== "U" Craiova, Rapid and Kavala ===
In 2005, Bornescu went to play for Universitatea Craiova. He scored four goals from the penalty spot in 29 matches during the 2005–06 season to help the team achieve promotion to the first league. Subsequently, he made his Liga I debut on 29 July 2006 under coach Ovidiu Stîngă, managing to keep a clean sheet in a 0–0 draw against FC Vaslui. Until the end of the season, he netted two penalties, including the winning goal in a 2–1 victory over Unirea Urziceni and another one in a 2–2 draw against Pandurii Târgu Jiu. In October 2007, during a match against Universitatea Craiova, Bornescu kicked opponent Cristian Coroian in the back with his studs, resulting in four fractured ribs for Coroian and a six-match suspension for Bornescu. Following four seasons spent with "U" Craiova, Bornescu joined Rapid București in 2009. After a two-season spell with Rapid, he went alongside coach Marius Șumudică to Greek side Kavala. However, he never played an official match for them, leaving within two months after the club's relegation due to past match-fixing involvement.

=== Petrolul and "U" Cluj ===
In September 2011, Bornescu and former Kavala teammate Alin Buleică signed with Petrolul Ploiești at the request of coach Valeriu Răchită. In 2012, he moved to Universitatea Cluj. In May 2012, Bornescu found himself at the center of a controversy during a derby against CFR Cluj when, after conceding a penalty goal, he shoved Ricardo Cadú to the ground because the opponent was celebrating directly in front of the "U" Cluj fans, sparking a massive team brawl that ultimately forced referee Alexandru Tudor to stop the match. Bornescu and Cadú each received a two-match suspension. In the summer of 2012, he was transferred back to Petrolul Ploiești, along with 11 other players from "U" Cluj, a move that occurred when the owner of the Cluj team left the club to take control of Petrolul. During a league game against Gaz Metan Mediaș on 29 May 2013, Bornescu was sent off for biting opponent Tha'er Bawab; consequently, his victim was sent off for a retaliatory punch to the face, after which a brawl ensued between the two teams and Bornescu received an eight-match suspension. The team won the 2012–13 Cupa României, but due to the suspension, coach Cosmin Contra could not use Bornescu in the 1–0 win over CFR Cluj in the final. He later featured in two matches during the 2013–14 Europa League campaign, beginning with a 4–0 win against Víkingur Gøta that secured their progression past the second round. He subsequently appeared in a 2–1 victory over Swansea City in the play-off second leg; however, the team was eliminated following a 5–1 defeat in the opening leg.

=== Rapid and Voluntari ===
In the summer of 2014, Bornescu made a comeback to Rapid, but could not avoid the team's relegation to the second league at the end of the 2014–15 season. Afterwards, he joined Voluntari in January 2016. He helped the team win the 2016–17 Cupa României, but coach Claudiu Niculescu preferred to use Dragoș Balauru in the victory in the final against Astra Giurgiu. Bornescu's last Liga I appearance took place on 31 May 2017 in Voluntari's 1–1 draw against Politehnica Iași, totaling 227 matches in the competition.

== International career ==
In 1998, Bornescu made several appearances for Romania's under-18 and under-21 sides.

== Personal life ==
His father, Petre, was a boxer who was the national champion in 1986 and 1987.

== Honours ==
Universitatea Craiova

- Divizia B: 2005–06

Petrolul Ploiești

- Cupa României: 2012–13

FC Voluntari

- Cupa României: 2016–17
