= Iustin Răducan =

Romanian footballer (born 2005)

Personal information
- Full name: Iustin Alexandru Răducan
- Date of birth: 20 July 2005 (age 21)
- Place of birth: Bucharest, Romania
- Height: 1.82 m (6 ft 0 in)
- Position: Forward

Youth career
- –2022: Sport Team București
- 2022: → CSA Steaua București (loan)
- 2022–2023: CSA Steaua București

Senior career*
Years	Team	Apps	(Gls)
2022–2023	CSA Steaua București	6	(0)
2023–2025	Petrolul Ploiești	15	(0)
2026	CS Dinamo București	5	(0)

International career^{‡}
2022	Romania U17	3	(0)
2022–2023	Romania U18	13	(1)
2023	Romania U19	5	(1)
- * Club domestic league appearances and goals as of 9 May 2026 ‡ National team caps and goals as of 21 November 2023

Iustin Alexandru Răducan (born 20 July 2005) is a Romanian professional footballer who plays as a forward.

== Club career ==
Răducan made his professional debut for Petrolul Ploiești on 24 September 2023, in a goalless Liga I draw with Hermannstadt.

== Personal life ==
Răducan's father, Narcis, was also a footballer.
