= Corneliu Bogdan =

Corneliu Bogdan (born Grumberg, 1921 – 2 January 1990) was a Romanian diplomat, who was Romania's ambassador to the United States between 1967 and 1976.

He was born in Moșoaia, Argeș County. In his youth he was one of the leaders of the Romanian National Students' Union. In 1989 he was a visiting scholar at the Woodrow Wilson International Center for Scholars.

He was a minister of state at the post-revolutionary Ministry of Foreign Affairs (28 December 1989 to 2 January 1990).

Corneliu Bogdan was married to Emilia, with whom he had three children: Svetlana, Ileana, and Olga.

He died in Bucharest of a stroke, and is buried in the city's Bellu Cemetery.

== Books ==
- Sferele de influență, București, Editura Politică, 1986 (with Eugen Preda)
- Spheres of Influence (with Eugen Preda), Columbia University Press, ISBN 0-88033-961-6 (0-88033-961-6)
