= Narcis Răducan =

Romanian footballer

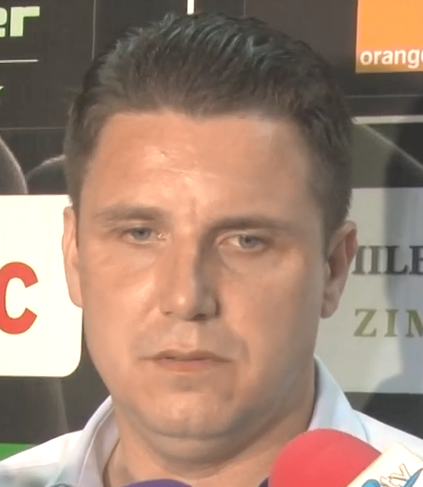
- Răducan în 2015

Personal information
- Full name: Narcis Claudiu Răducan
- Date of birth: 23 September 1974 (age 52)
- Place of birth: Focșani, Romania
- Height: 1.77 m (5 ft 10 in)
- Position: Attacking midfielder

Youth career
- 1990–1993: Unirea Focșani
- 1993: Viitorul București

Senior career*
Years	Team	Apps	(Gls)
1993–1994	Progresul București	8	(0)
1994–1995	Selena Bacău	32	(18)
1995–1996	Steaua București	32	(3)
1996–1997	Bacău	15	(2)
1997–1998	Steaua București	16	(1)
1998–1999	Bacău	30	(4)
1999–2000	Rapid București	16	(0)
2000–2001	Național București	21	(2)
2001–2002	Electromagnetica București	4	(1)
2002	Rapid București	4	(0)
2002–2005	Bacău	71	(6)
2005–2006	AEL Limassol	21	(0)
2006–2007	AEK Larnaca	24	(6)
2007–2008	Ceahlăul Piatra Neamț	5	(1)
Total		299	(44)

International career
2000	Romania	1	(0)
- * Club domestic league appearances and goals

Narcis Claudiu Răducan (born 23 September 1974) is a Romanian former professional footballer who played as a midfielder.

== Personal life ==
Răducan was born in Focşani. His son, Iustin, was also a footballer.

== Honours ==
FCM Bacău

- Liga II: 1994–95

Steaua București

- Liga I: 1995–96, 1996–97, 1997–98
- Cupa României: 1995–96, 1996–97

Rapid București

- Cupa României: 2001–02
- Supercupa României: 1999
