= Mihai Zamfir =

Romanian footballer

Personal information
- Date of birth: 22 January 1955 (age 71)
- Place of birth: Moșoaia, Romania
- Height: 1.86 m (6 ft 1 in)
- Positions: Right back; left back

Youth career
- 1971–1973: Argeș Pitești

Senior career*
| Years | Team | Apps | (Gls) |
| 1973–1984 | Argeș Pitești | 276 | (10) |
| 1984–1987 | Olt Scornicești | 89 | (1) |
| 1988 | Inter Sibiu | | |
| 1988–1989 | Dacia Pitești | | |
| Total | | 365 | (11) |

International career
| 1978–1981 | Romania | 10 | (0) |

Managerial career
- Dacia Pitești
- 1993: Argeș Pitești
- 1998: Chimica Târnăveni
- 1999: Argeș Pitești
- 2000: Dacia Pitești
- 2000: Politehnica Timișoara
- 2001: Cimentul Fieni
- 2001–2002: Argeș Pitești (assistant)
- 2003–2004: Dacia Mioveni (assistant)
- 2006–2007: Unirea Alba Iulia
- 2010: Argeș Pitești
- 2011–2012: Girom Albota
- 2014: Al Sabah
- * Club domestic league appearances and goals

Mihai Zamfir (born 22 January 1955) is a Romanian former football defender and manager.

== Club career ==
Zamfir was born on 22 January 1955 in Moșoaia, Romania and began playing junior-level football in 1971 at Argeș Pitești. He made his Divizia A debut on 30 September 1973 under coach Ștefan Coidum in a 2–1 home victory against Sportul Studențesc București. In the 1978–79 UEFA Cup edition he helped the team eliminate Panathinaikos in the first round with a 5–1 aggregate victory. In the following round they met Valencia led by Mario Kempes, earning a 2–1 win in the first leg, but they lost the second one with 5–2, thus the campaign ended. In the same season he helped Argeș win the title, being used by coach Florin Halagian in 33 games in which he scored two goals. In the following season they got past AEK Athens in the first round of the 1979–80 European Cup, the team being eliminated in the following one by title holders and eventual winners, Nottingham Forest, Zamfir receiving a red card for repeated fouls in the 80th minute of the first leg.

In 1984 he joined Olt Scornicești where he made his last Divizia A appearance on 17 December 1987 in a 0–0 draw against Dinamo București, totaling 365 matches with 11 goals in the competition and 12 games in European competitions. Zamfir ended his career in 1989, after playing in Divizia B for Inter Sibiu and Dacia Pitești, helping the first earn promotion to the first league.

== International career ==
Zamfir played 10 games for Romania, making his debut when coach Ștefan Kovács sent him in the 24th minute to replace Florin Cheran in a 2–0 win over Bulgaria in the 1977–80 Balkan Cup. He also played in the second leg against Bulgaria which ended in a 1–1 draw. Subsequently, he made three appearances in the Euro 1980 qualifiers. Zamfir's last appearance occurred on 8 April 1981 in a 2–1 away loss in a friendly against Israel.

== Managerial career ==
Zamfir coached several clubs in Romanian football, starting with Dacia Pitești, then working for Argeș Pitești, Chimica Târnăveni, Politehnica Timișoara, Cimentul Fieni, Unirea Alba Iulia and Girom Albota. He also worked as an assistant for Nicolae Dobrin and Florin Halagian at Argeș Pitești, and for Cornel Iliescu at Dacia Mioveni. Zamfir coached abroad at the United Arab Emirates club Al Sabah.

== Personal life ==
His wife, Dana, was a handball player and his daughter Cristina played volleyball.

== Honours ==
Argeș Pitești

- Divizia A: 1978–79

Inter Sibiu

- Divizia B: 1987–88
