= Traian Georgescu =

Romanian former footballer

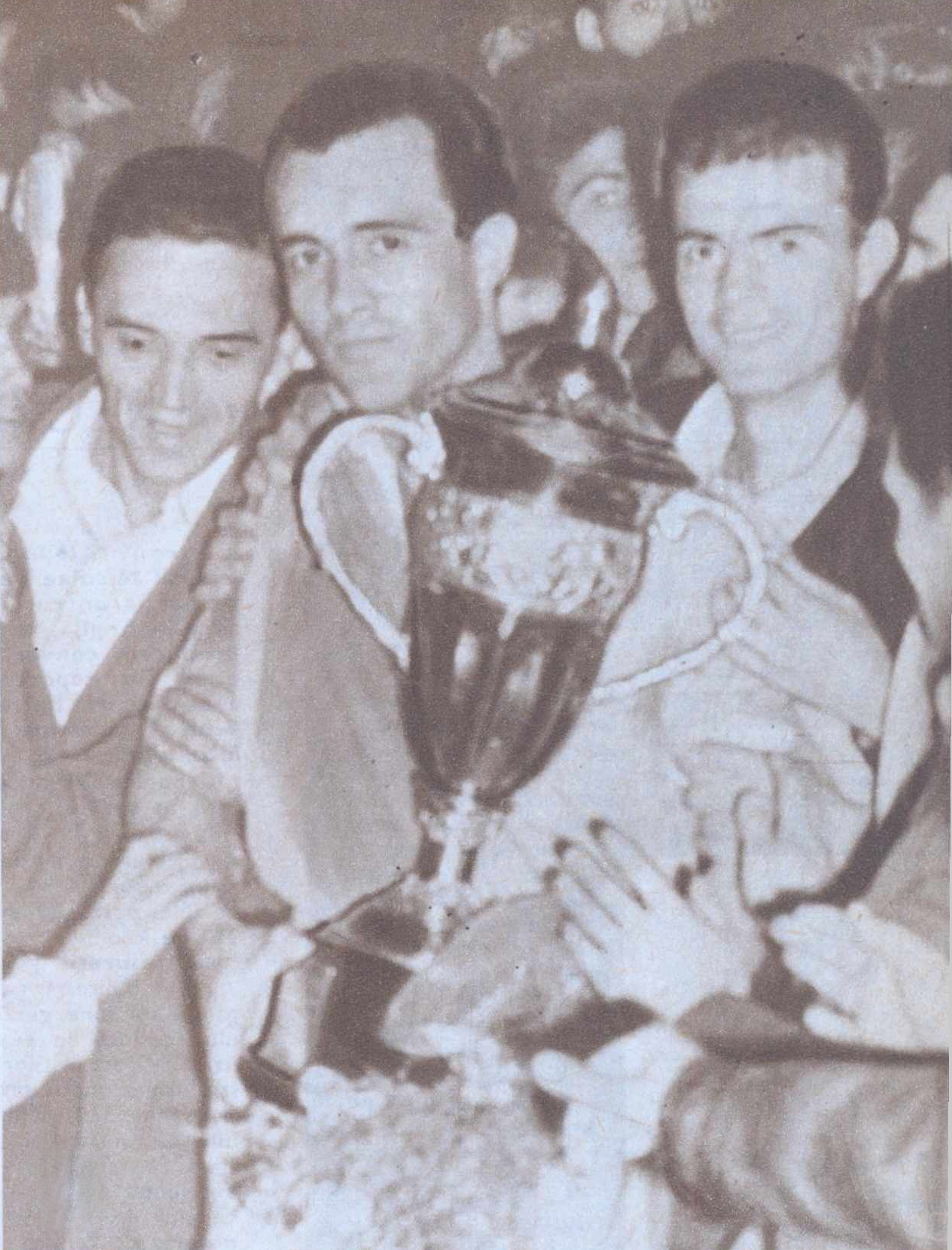
- Georgescu holding the Cupa României trophy in 1965.

Personal information
- Date of birth: 20 March 1931
- Place of birth: Ploiești, Romania
- Date of death: 15 May 2008 (aged 77)
- Place of death: Romania
- Height: 1.74 m (5 ft 9 in)
- Positions: Midfielder; defender

Youth career
- 1946–1948: Prahova Ploiești
- 1948–1951: Concordia Ploiești

Senior career*
| Years | Team | Apps | (Gls) |
| 1951–1966 | Universitatea Cluj | 303 | (17) |
- * Club domestic league appearances and goals as of 1 January 2020

Traian Georgescu (20 March 1931 – 15 May 2008) was a Romanian football defender who spent his entire career at Universitatea Cluj. He was U Cluj's captain when the club won the 1964–65 Cupa României.

== Career ==
"The man who brought balance. An exceptional player, he was the conductor of the defence. At the same time, he provided the midfielders and forwards with his precise passing. A truly selfless player and an exceptional captain. That is what a captain should be like."

— Former U Cluj teammate Remus Câmpeanu on Georgescu.

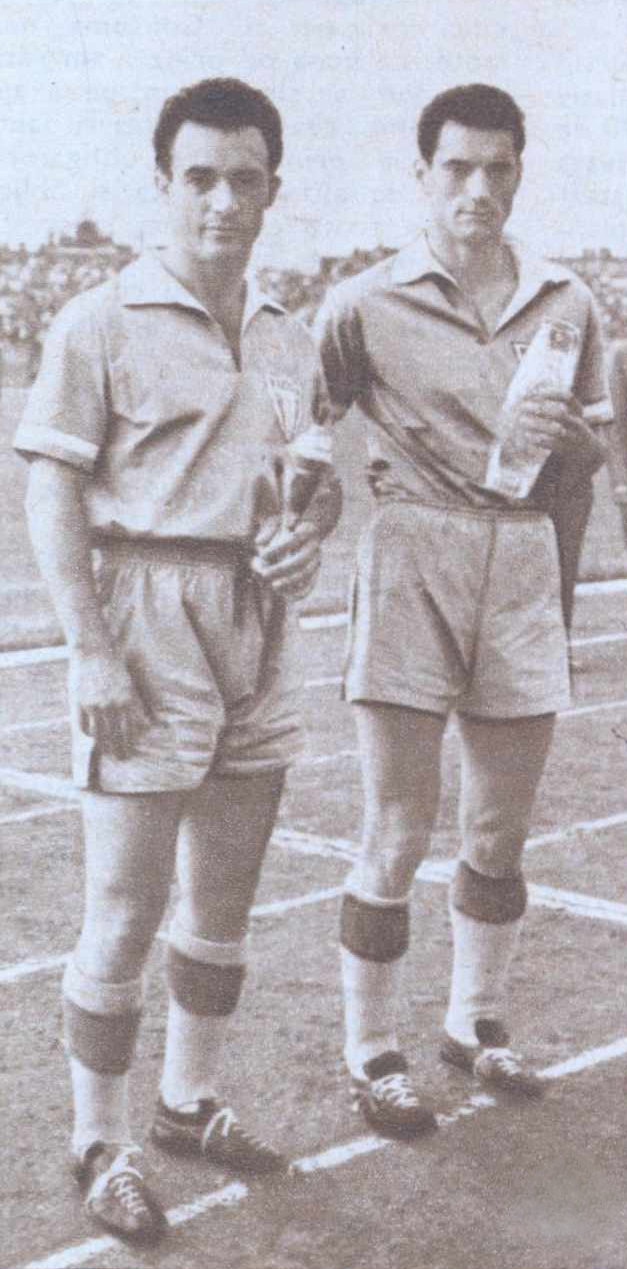
Georgescu (left) with fellow U Cluj teammate Mihai Adam in 1965.

Georgescu was born on 20 March 1931 in Ploiești, Romania and began playing junior-level football in 1946 at local club Prahova, then switched teams in 1948, going to neighboring club Concordia. He went to college at the Faculty of Medicine in Cluj-Napoca, where he started to play senior-level football at Universitatea, making his Divizia A debut on 15 April 1951 under coach Iuliu Baratky in a 4–1 away loss to Flacăra Petroșani. In the same year, he scored a hat-trick in Universitatea's 3–1 victory against CCA București, and the press considered the second goal the most beautiful of that season for "U", as Georgescu made a run from the center of the field and with a 20-meter shot, he defeated goalkeeper Ion Voinescu. By the end of his first season he would score a total of six goals, in addition to the hat-trick against CCA, he scored once against each of Dinamo București, Locomotiva Timișoara and Flacăra Mediaș, the latter being in the Cupa României. In 1954, he was called up by Romania's national team coach, Ștefan Dobay for a friendly against Hungary, but he did not play. After the team was relegated in 1956, Georgescu stayed with the club, also becoming the team's captain after Mircea Luca retired, helping it get promoted back to the first league a year later in which he scored four goals in 23 matches. He helped "U" Cluj win the 1964–65 Cupa României, being used the entire match by coach Andrei Sepci in the 2–1 victory in the final against Dinamo Pitești. Subsequently, Georgescu played three games in the 1965–66 European Cup Winners' Cup, helping The Red Caps eliminate Austrian team, Wiener Neustadt in the first round, being eliminated in the following round by Atlético Madrid. He retired shortly after the double against the Spaniards, having a total of 280 Divizia A games with 13 goals scored.

== Personal life and death ==
He also worked as a surgeon, and when his teammate Remus Câmpeanu was diagnosed with appendicitis, Georgescu performed the surgery on Câmpeanu's request.

Georgescu died in 2008, several years after being diagnosed with Alzheimer's disease.

== Honours ==
Universitatea Cluj

- Divizia B: 1957–58
- Cupa României: 1964–65

== See also ==
- List of one-club men in association football
