= Cosmin Mariș =

Romanian footballer

Personal information
- Full name: Cosmin Adrian Mariș
- Date of birth: 6 January 1975 (age 51)
- Place of birth: Cluj, Romania
- Position: Forward

Youth career
- Universitatea Cluj

Senior career*
Years	Team	Apps	(Gls)
1994–1997	Universitatea Cluj	61	(16)
1997–2001	Fortuna Sittard	10	(0)
2001–2002	TOP Oss	23	(0)
2004–2005	ACU Arad		
Total		94	(16)

International career
1997	Romania U21	1	(0)
- * Club domestic league appearances and goals

Cosmin Adrian Mariș (born 6 January 1975) is a Romanian former footballer who played as a forward.

== Club career ==
Mariș was born on 6 January 1975 in Cluj, Romania. He played junior-level football at Universitatea Cluj. He made his Divizia A debut on 19 April 1995 under coach Ioan Andone in "U" Cluj's 1–0 home loss to Dinamo București. Subsequently, he made three appearances in the 1995 Intertoto Cup. In the 1995–96 season, Mariș scored a personal record of nine league goals, including a double in a 2–0 win over Rapid București. His last Divizia A appearance took place on 7 June 1997 in a 3–1 loss to Ceahlăul Piatra Neamț, totaling 61 matches with 16 goals in the competition.

In 1997, Mariș and his teammate, Alin Bănceu, were transferred together from "U" Cluj to Fortuna Sittard. There, they became teammates with their compatriot Dorel Zegrean and a young Mark van Bommel. Mariș made his Eredivisie debut on 3 May 1998 when Bert van Marwijk sent him in the 87th minute to replace Roberto Lanckohr in a 4–1 home win over NAC Breda. Over the course of four seasons, Mariș made 10 league appearances for Fortuna.

For the 2001–02 season, Mariș joined Eerste Divisie club TOP Oss. He ended his career in 2005, after playing one season for Divizia B club ACU Arad. His career performances were limited by a fibula fracture.

== International career ==
Mariș played one game for Romania's under-21 team on 19 March 1997 when coach Victor Pițurcă sent him in the 49th minute to replace Bogdan Andone in a 1–1 draw against Hungary.
