= Simion Mironaș =

Romanian footballer (1965–2022)

Personal information
- Date of birth: 19 November 1965
- Place of birth: Tarcău, Romania
- Date of death: 7 May 2022 (aged 56)
- Place of death: Iași, Romania
- Position: Defender

Senior career*
Years	Team	Apps	(Gls)
1985–1986	Minerul Vatra Dornei		
1986	CSM Suceava	67	(5)
1986–1988	→ Steaua II București (loan)		
1991	Argeș Pitești	19	(1)
1992–1997	Gloria Bistrița	153	(32)
1993	→ Békéscsaba (loan)	5	(0)
1994	→ Dinamo București (loan)	2	(0)
1996	→ Rapid București (loan)	13	(0)
1998	Unirea Dej	1	(0)
1998–1999	Progresul Șomcuta Mare		
1999–2000	Olimpia Satu Mare	31	(4)
2000	Corvinul Hunedoara	6	(0)
Total		297	(42)
- * Club domestic league appearances and goals

Simion Mironaș (19 November 1965 – 7 May 2022) was a Romanian professional footballer who played as a defender.

== Career ==
In the 8th round of the 1994–95 Divizia A season Simion played on 13 October 1994 for Gloria Bistrița against Rapid București and on 15 October for Dinamo București against Universitatea Cluj, thus becoming the only Romanian that played for two teams in the same round.

== Conviction ==
On 28 February 1998, Mironaș was involved in a road accident while driving his car in Susenii Bârgăului, Bistrița-Năsăud County and hit two teenagers, one of them who was 15 years old died. He was driving without a license after a few days earlier he hit a pregnant woman on the crosswalk. Mironaș received a one-year suspended sentence.

== Honours ==
Gloria Bistrița

- Cupa României: 1993–94
