= Remus Vlad =

Romanian footballer and manager

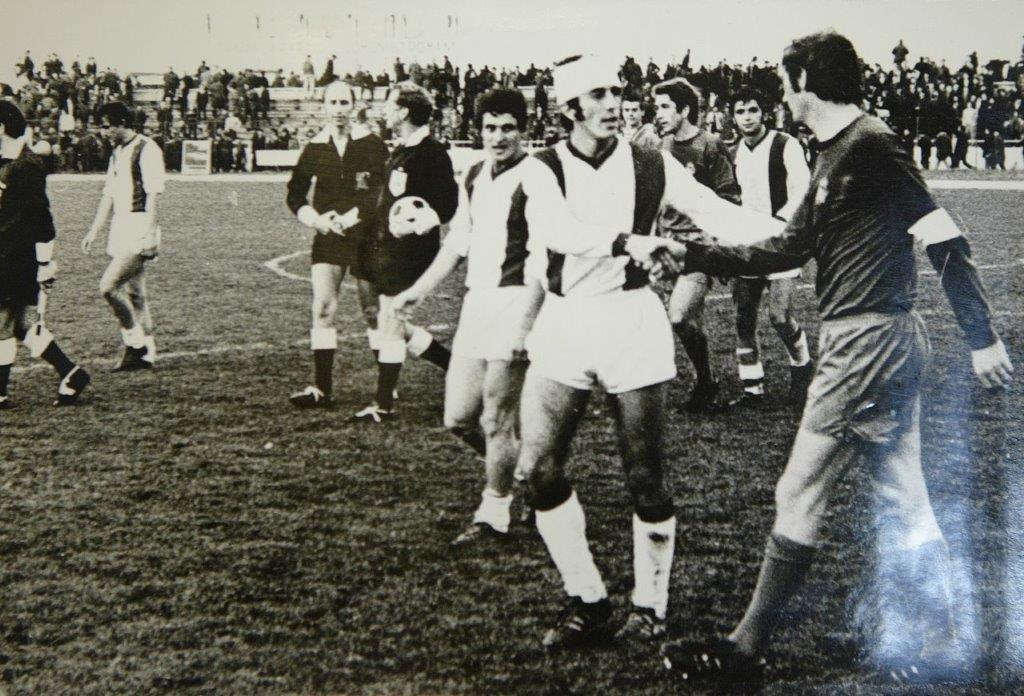
- Remus Vlad (left) and Ignacio Zoco (right) in 1972.

Personal information
- Date of birth: 19 January 1946 (age 80)
- Place of birth: Cinciș, Romania
- Height: 1.76 m (5 ft 9 in)
- Position: Defender

Youth career
- 1957–1959: Minerul Teliuc
- 1960–1966: Corvinul Hunedoara

Senior career*
Years	Team	Apps	(Gls)
1966–1968	Metalul Hunedoara	13	(0)
1968–1974	Argeș Pitești	175	(4)
1974–1978	Corvinul Hunedoara	44	(0)
Total		232	(4)

International career^{‡}
1967–1968	Romania U-21	30	(0)
1972–1978	Romania	3	(0)

Managerial career
- 1982–1983: Corvinul Hunedoara
- 1983–1985: Universitatea Cluj
- 1985–1988: Universitatea Cluj
- 1990–1992: Gloria Bistrița
- 1992–1993: Universitatea Cluj
- 1993–1994: Universitatea Cluj (technical director)
- 1994: Gloria Bistrița
- 1994: Gloria Bistrița (technical director)
- 1995: Dinamo București
- 1996–1997: Gloria Bistrița
- 1999–2000: Olimpia Satu Mare
- 2002–2004: Gloria Bistrița
- 2004–2009: Gloria Bistrița (technical director)
- 2014: Gloria Bistrița (technical director)
- * Club domestic league appearances and goals as of 1 March 2018 ‡ National team caps and goals as of 1 March 2018

Remus Vlad (born 19 January 1946) is a Romanian former professional footballer and manager. Vlad played as a defender.

== Club career ==
Vlad was born 19 January 1946 in Cinciș, Hunedoara County, Romania and began playing junior-level football in 1957 at Minerul Teliuc. In 1960 he moved to Metalul Hunedoara where he worked with junior coach Dumitru Pătrașcu, then six years later he started to play for the senior squad in Divizia B.

Vlad was close to a move to Dinamo București, but eventually he went to Argeș Pitești. There, on 18 August 1968 he made his Divizia A debut under coach Ion Bălănescu in a 4–0 home win against Politehnica Iași. In his first years at the club he would make a successful partnership in the central defense with Ion Barbu. After Barbu went to play for Beşiktaş, Vlad was elected as the team's captain, as star player Nicolae Dobrin insisted for this because he appreciated Vlad's professionalism. In the 1971–72 season he helped Argeș win their first title, as coaches Titus Ozon and Florin Halagian gave him 30 appearances. Afterwards he played four games in the 1972–73 European Cup, eliminating Aris Bonnevoie in the first round, then in the following one they won a home game with 2–1 against Real Madrid, but lost the second leg with 3–1. Years later in an interview for the Adevărul newspaper, he talked about the victory against the Spaniards:"I am proud of the fact that I was the captain of the team. That match was the biggest event in my sporting life, I met a huge team. It was a performance, we beat the great Real Madrid in Pitești. The Spaniards had a team with many internationals. We were a group of young people, including Florin Halagian, our coach was young. We also had a very good second coach, Tănase Dima. I had no special preparation for the match against Real. Before the match, we all had special personal experiences, because we realized what a great team we were going to play with, the legendary Santiago Bernabéu was also present in Pitești. It was an extraordinary event, I was somehow floating."

In 1974, Vlad returned to Hunedoara in Divizia B, helping them gain promotion to the first league two years later. Vlad's last Divizia A appearance occurred on 4 December 1977 in a 1–0 home win to Olimpia Satu Mare, totaling 219 matches with four goals in the competition and 10 games in European competitions (including four in the Inter-Cities Fairs Cup).

== International career ==
Vlad was taken in consideration to be a member of Romania's squad that went to the 1970 World Cup, but eventually Nicolae Pescaru was preferred in his place. He played three friendly games for The Tricolours, making his debut under Gheorghe Ola on 30 January 1972 in a 4–2 away win over Morocco. His following game was a 2–2 draw against Peru and his last one was a 2–0 away loss to the Soviet Union.

== Managerial career ==
While still being an active player, Vlad started coaching juniors at Corvinul, discovering Mircea Rednic. In 1982 he became head coach of Corvinul after Mircea Lucescu left the team, guiding it through the 1982–83 UEFA Cup campaign, as they eliminated Grazer AK in the first round, but were defeated in the following one by FK Sarajevo. With a few rounds before the end of his first season, Vlad left the team because the club transferred Rednic and Ioan Andone to Dinamo București without consulting him.

He went to coach in Divizia B at Universitatea Cluj, being brought there by the club's president Remus Câmpeanu, helping them gain promotion to the first league in his second season. Subsequently, Vlad led The Red Caps for three full seasons in the top-league, earning a seventh-place finish in the first season and two tenth-place finishes in the next two seasons. However, after the first half of the 1988–89 season he was replaced with Cornel Dinu. Notably, in this period he gave 18-year-old Ioan Sabău his Divizia A debut. In 1990 he went to coach Gloria Bistrița in Divizia B, helping them earn a first-ever promotion to the first league. Vlad returned to "U" Cluj for the 1992–93 Divizia A season, finishing it in 11th place. He then started the following season by working as the club's technical director, with Dan Anca serving as head coach. In 1994 he returned to Gloria Bistrița, first as head coach. Shortly afterwards he became Gloria's technical director and together with coach Constantin Cârstea, they helped the club win its first trophy, the 1993–94 Cupa României, after a 1–0 win over Universitatea Craiova in the final.

In January 1995, Vlad became head coach of Dinamo București, taking the club from the seventh place and finishing third. Thus they qualified to the 1995–96 UEFA Cup where they were eliminated in the preliminary round by Levski Sofia with 2–1 on aggregate. He left the club in November 1995. Vlad returned to Gloria Bistrița once again, reaching the 1996 Cupa României final which was lost with 3–1 to Steaua București. He also led the team in the 1996–97 Cup Winners' Cup, helping them eliminate Valletta in the qualifying round, being eliminated with 2–1 on aggregate by Gabriel Batistuta's Fiorentina in the first round. From 1999 to 2000 he worked for eight months at Olimpia Satu Mare. Vlad had his last coaching spell from 2002 until 2004 at Gloria Bistrița with which he finished the 2002–03 season in third place. Afterwards he would work for Gloria on several occasions as a technical director.

Vlad has a total of 355 matches as a manager in the Romanian top-division, Divizia A, consisting of 144 victories, 63 draws and 148 losses, also totaling 20 matches led in European competitions.

== Personal life ==
In 2013, Vlad received the Honorary Citizen of Hunedoara title.

== Honours ==
=== Player ===
Argeș Pitești

- Divizia A: 1971–72

Corvinul Hunedoara

- Divizia B: 1975–76

=== Manager ===
Universitatea Cluj

- Divizia B: 1984–85

Gloria Bistrița

- Divizia B: 1989–90
- Cupa României runner-up: 1995–96
