= Sandu Tăbârcă =

Romanian footballer and manager

Personal information
- Date of birth: 11 July 1965 (age 61)
- Place of birth: Timișoara, Romania
- Position: Forward

Senior career*
Years	Team	Apps	(Gls)
- UM Timișoara
–1990	Electromotor Timișoara		
1991–1995	ASK Ybbs		
1996–1998	SV Neumarkt		
1998–2001	SKU Amstetten		

Managerial career
- 2001–2006: SKU Amstetten
- 2006–2007: FC Waidhofen/Ybbs
- 2009: Gloria Bistrița
- 2010–2011: Universitatea Craiova (sporting director)
- 2011: Universitatea Craiova (assistant)
- 2011: Voința Sibiu (technical director)
- 2012: FCM Târgu Mureș (technical director)
- 2012–2013: Rapid București (assistant)
- 2013: Brașov (assistant)
- 2013: Rapid București
- 2021–2022: ASU Politehnica Timișoara (academy manager)
- 2023: Universitatea Cluj (assistant)
- 2023–2025: Universitatea Cluj (technical director)
- * Club domestic league appearances and goals

Sandu Tăbârcă, sometimes written Tăbîrcă, (born 11 July 1965) is a Romanian football manager and former player.
