= Sabin Ilie =

Romanian footballer (born in 1975)

Personal information
- Date of birth: 11 May 1975 (age 51)
- Place of birth: Craiova, Romania
- Height: 1.77 m (5 ft 10 in)
- Position: Striker

Youth career
- –1993: CSȘ Craiova

Senior career*
Years	Team	Apps	(Gls)
1993–1994	Electroputere Craiova	4	(0)
1994–1995	Brașov	19	(5)
1995–1997	Steaua București	54	(33)
1997	Fenerbahçe	12	(3)
1998	Kocaelispor	7	(2)
1998–2002	Valencia	0	(0)
1999	→ Lleida (loan)	20	(3)
1999	→ Steaua București (loan)	15	(3)
2000	→ Național București (loan)	24	(14)
2001	→ Energie Cottbus (loan)	10	(0)
2001	→ Dinamo București (loan)	7	(3)
2002	→ Național București (loan)	23	(5)
2002–2003	Debrecen	10	(6)
2003–2004	Rapid București	31	(18)
2005	Changchun Yatai	24	(14)
2005	Vaslui	4	(0)
2006	Jiangsu Sainty	5	(1)
2006	UTA Arad	8	(1)
2007	Iraklis	3	(1)
2007	Dunărea Giurgiu	4	(0)
2008	Qingdao Hailifeng	22	(18)
2018	Viitorul Domnești		
Total		306	(130)

International career
1996–1997	Romania U21	4	(0)

Managerial career
- 2018: Viitorul Domnești (player/manager)
- 2019: Daco-Getica București (team manager)
- 2021–2022: Academica Clinceni (scouting team manager)
- * Club domestic league appearances and goals

Sabin Ilie (born 11 May 1975) is a Romanian former professional footballer who played as a striker in Romania, Turkey, Spain, Germany, Hungary, China and Greece.

== Career ==
Ilie had a long career, playing for nineteen clubs. He began his career with Electroputere Craiova, and played for Steaua București and Național București before short spells in Turkey, Spain and Germany. He had a spell with Fenerbahçe and Kocaelispor in the Turkish Süper Lig.

== Personal life ==
He is the younger brother of fellow footballer Adrian Ilie.

== Honours ==
Steaua București

- Divizia A: 1995–96, 1996–97
- Cupa României: 1995–96, 1996–97
- Supercupa României: 1995

Individual

- Divizia A top scorer: 1996–97 (31 goals)
- China League One top scorer: 2008 (18 goals)
