= Dumitru Dumitriu =

Romanian footballer

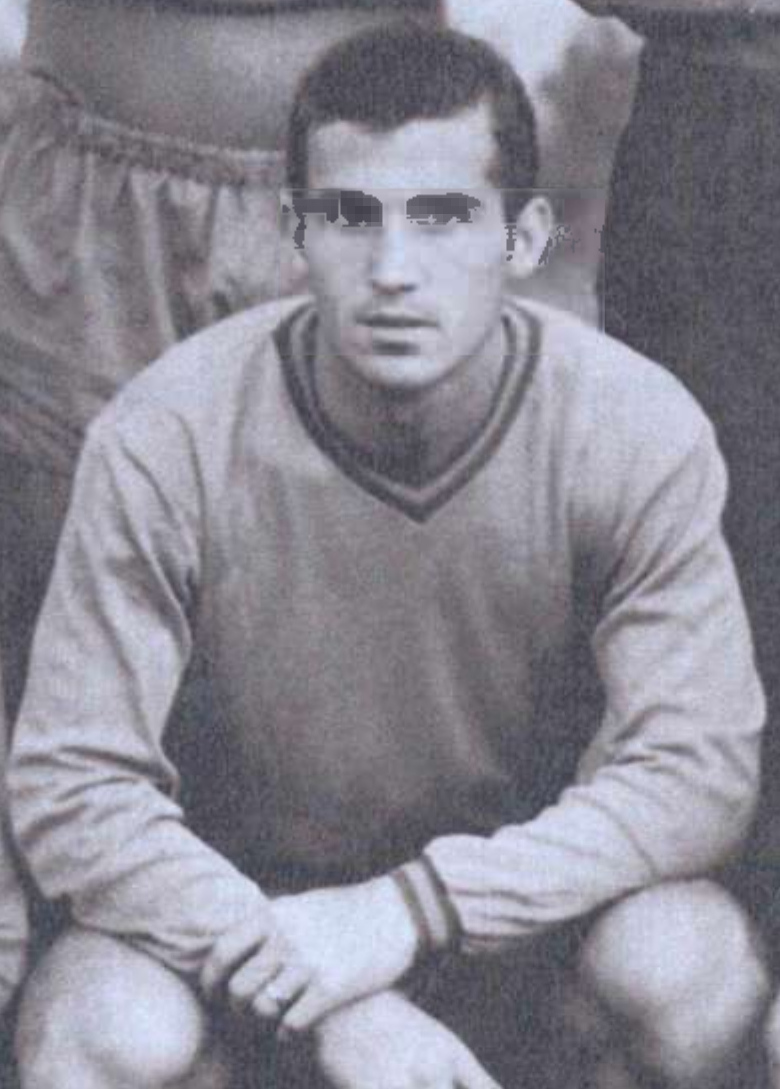
- Dumitriu in 1968

Personal information
- Date of birth: 19 November 1945 (age 80)
- Place of birth: Bucharest, Romania
- Height: 1.76 m (5 ft 9 in)
- Position: Midfielder

Team information
- Current team: Academica Clinceni (vice-president)

Youth career
- 1953–1964: Rapid București

Senior career*
Years	Team	Apps	(Gls)
1964–1965	Metalul Târgoviște		
1965–1968	Târgu Mureș^{1}^{2}	22	(13)
1968–1972	Steaua București	90	(11)
1972–1973	Rapid București	27	(6)
1973–1974	Olimpia Satu Mare	25	(3)
1974–1975	Galați	28	(4)
1975–1977	ICSIM București		
Total		192	(37)

International career
1967	Romania	1	(0)

Managerial career
- 1976–1977: ICSIM București (player-manager)
- 1977–1978: Rapid Fetești
- 1978–1980: CS Botoșani
- 1980–1982: Ceahlăul Piatra Neamț
- 1982–1984: Autobuzul București
- 1984–1986: Steaua Mizil
- 1987: Rulmentul Bârlad
- 1988–1990: Steaua București (assistant)
- 1990–1991: Romania U-21
- 1991–1992: Dacia Unirea Brăila
- 1992–1993: Steaua București (assistant)
- 1993–1994: Romania (assistant)
- 1994–1997: Steaua București
- 1997–1998: AEK Athens
- 1998: Apollon Limassol
- 1998–1999: Rapid București
- 1999–2000: Oțelul Galați
- 2000–2001: Rocar București
- 2001–2002: Panionios
- 2002: FCM Bacău
- 2003: Akratitos
- 2003–2004: Bihor Oradea
- 2004: Politehnica Timișoara
- 2005: FCSB
- 2006–2008: Prefab Moldelu (technical director)
- 2009–2010: FCSB II (technical director)
- 2010: Politehnica Iași
- 2011–2012: Inter Clinceni
- 2014–2015: Inter Clinceni
- 2015: FCSB
- * Club domestic league appearances and goals

Dumitru Dumitriu (born 19 November 1945 in Bucharest), commonly known as Țiți Dumitru or Dumitriu III, is a retired Romanian footballer and coach. He is the younger brother of Emil Dumitriu (Dumitriu II) who was an International footballer and champion of Romania with Rapid București and the elder brother of Constantin Dumitriu (Dumitriu IV) who won the Romanian championship with Steaua București.

== Club career ==
Dumitriu started his youth career with Rapid București and made his senior career debut with Metalul Târgoviște in 1964. After a year, he moved to ASA Târgu Mureș, where he spent three years. In 1968, he signed with Steaua București, where he played until 1972. In the same year he joined Bucharest city rivals Rapid București. He also played for Olimpia Satu Mare, FCM Galați and ICSIM București.

== International career ==
He won a cap for Romania in 1967.

== Managerial career ==
After he quit playing in 1977, he became quickly a player/manager for ICSIM București, amongst others in the beginning he managed lower league sides such as Rapid Fetești, Autobuzul București, Steaua Mizil, and Rulmentul Bârlad.

The highlight of his career as a manager was with Steaua București, qualifying them three times in a row in the UEFA Champions League and also winning the Romanian First League in 1995, 1996 and 1997. In 1999 and 2005 he won the championship again, this time with Rapid București and then with FCSB, leading him to a total of 5 championships won. He also guided Steaua to two Romanian Cups in 1996 and 1997, and two Romanian Supercups in 1994 and 1995.

In 1994, he was the assistant coach to Anghel Iordănescu in the 1994 FIFA World Cup.

In the 1997–98 season he reached the Cup Winners' Cup quarter-finals as AEK Athens manager, losing a semi-final place to Lokomotiv Moscow in the last minute of the second leg match.

== Honours ==
=== Player ===
Steaua București

- Romanian Cup (3): 1968–69, 1969–70, 1970–71

=== Manager ===
Steaua București

- Romanian First League (3): 1994–95, 1995–96, 1996–97
- Romanian Cup (2): 1995–96, 1996–97
- Romanian Supercup (2): 1994, 1995

Rapid București

- Romanian First League (1): 1998–99

Rocar București

- Romanian Cup runner-up (1): 2000–01

FCSB

- Romanian First League (1): 2004–05

== Notes ==
^1 The 1965–1966 appearances and goals made for ASA Târgu Mureş are unavailable.
^2 The 1966–1967 appearances made for ASA Târgu Mureş are unavailable.
