= Ioan Miszti =

Romanian footballer (born 1969)

Personal information
- Date of birth: 30 April 1969 (age 57)
- Place of birth: Chinteni, Romania
- Height: 1.85 m (6 ft 1 in)
- Positions: Defender; midfielder

Senior career*
Years	Team	Apps	(Gls)
1992–1994	CFR Cluj (Note: The statistics for the 1992–93 Divizia B season are unavailable.)	2	(0)
1994–2003	Gloria Bistrița	235	(26)
Total		237	(26)
- * Club domestic league appearances and goals

Ioan Miszti (born 30 April 1969) is a Romanian footballer who played as a defender.
