= Remus Câmpeanu =

Romanian footballer (1938–2021)

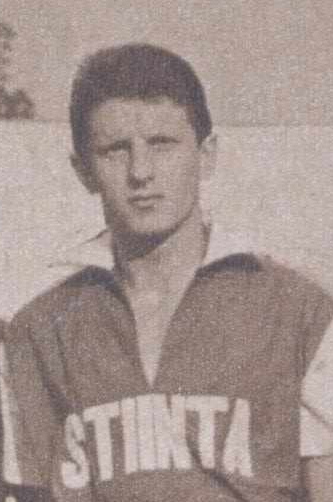
- Câmpeanu in 1963

Personal information
- Date of birth: 8 September 1938
- Place of birth: Cluj-Napoca, Romania
- Date of death: 3 April 2021 (aged 82)
- Height: 1.76 m (5 ft 9 in)
- Position: Left-back

Youth career
- 1950–1957: Flamura Roșie Cluj

Senior career*
Years	Team	Apps	(Gls)
1957–1960	Flamura Roșie Cluj		
1960–1974	Universitatea Cluj	328	(3)

International career
1963	Romania B	1	(0)
- * Club domestic league appearances and goals

Remus Câmpeanu (8 September 1938 – 3 April 2021) was a Romanian footballer who played as a left-back for Universitatea Cluj.

== Club career ==
"I was a hard-working player that the team could rely on, regardless of the opponent. I didn’t stand out, but I did my duty to my teammates. I was fond of all my teammates. Traian Georgescu was one of my best friends and helped me a lot in my career."

— Remus Câmpeanu reflecting on his playing career.

Câmpeanu was born on 8 September 1938 in Cluj-Napoca, Romania and began playing junior-level football when he was aged 11 at local club, Flamura Roșie. Later he played for Flamura's senior squad, helping the team get promoted to Divizia C and after only one season, to Divizia B, working with coaches Nicolae Szoboszlay and Ștefan Kovács.

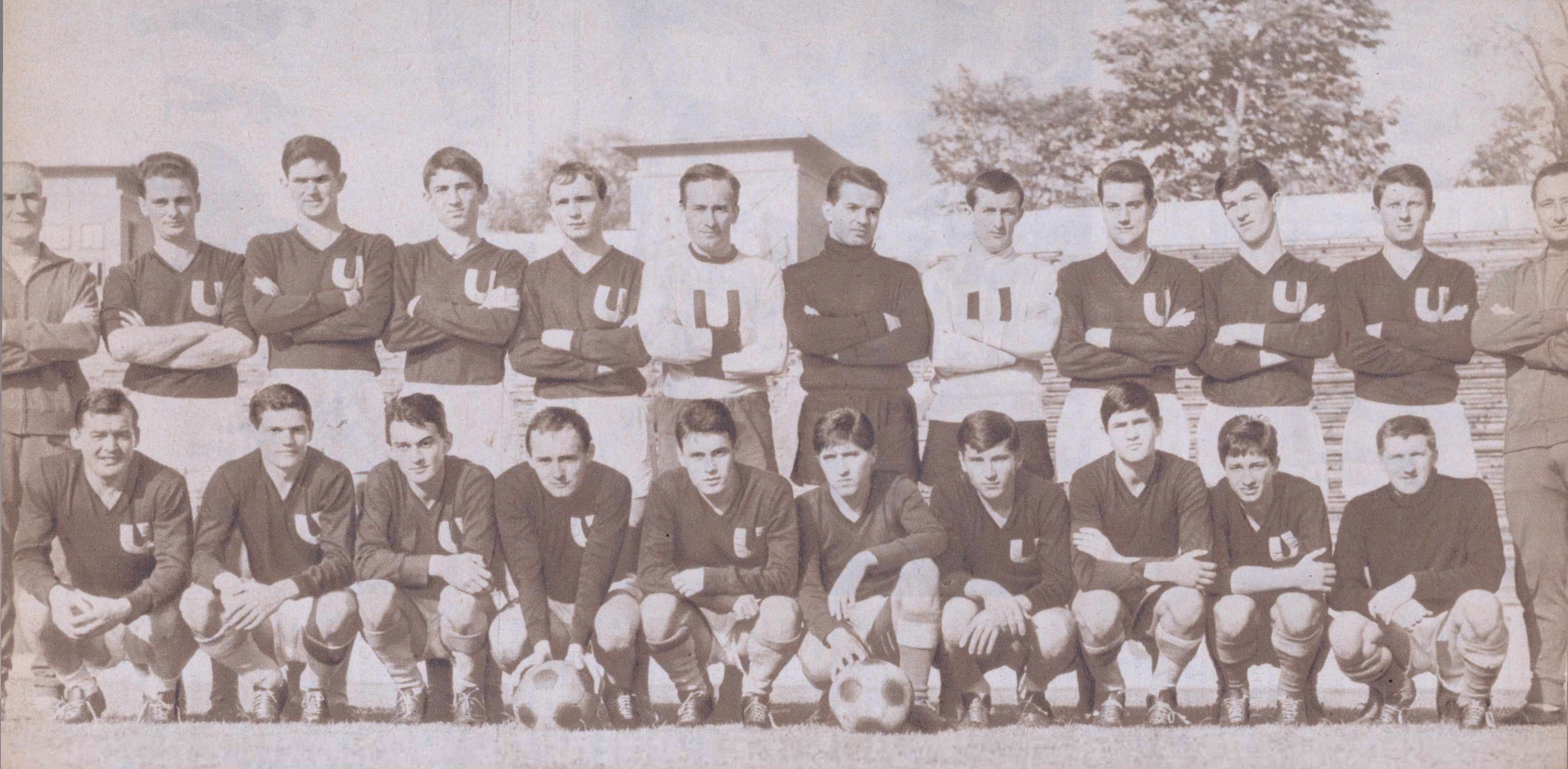
Câmpeanu (standing, second from the right) with U Cluj in 1966

In 1960, he was advised by Kovács to go play for Universitatea Cluj, where on 4 September he made his Divizia A debut under coach Andrei Sepci in a 2–0 away loss to Corvinul Hunedoara. He helped the club win the 1964–65 Cupa României, being used by Sepci in the entire game of the 2–1 victory in the final against Argeș Pitești in which he opened the scoring with a spectacular goal from about 30 meters. In the following season, Câmpeanu played four games in the 1965–66 European Cup Winners' Cup, helping "U" Cluj eliminate Austrian team, Wiener Neustadt in the first round, being eliminated in the following round by Atlético Madrid. In 1966, after Traian Georgescu left the club, Câmpeanu became the team's captain. In the 1971–72 season he helped The Red Caps finish in third position. Two years later, on 19 June 1974 he made his last Divizia A appearance in a 2–0 away loss to FC Constanța, totaling 328 matches with three goals in the competition. After his retirement from playing football, Câmpeanu was Universitatea Cluj's president from 1975 until 1989 and for a short while in 2008.

== International career ==
In 1963, Câmpeanu played for Romania B in a 1–1 draw against Yugoslavia. On 13 May 2020, Gazeta Sporturilor included him in list of best Romanian players who never played for Romania's senior team.

== Personal life and death ==
Romanian journalist Ion Cupen wrote a book about him titled Confesiunile unui veteran al gazonului (Confessions of a veteran of the pitch), which was released in 1978. When Câmpeanu was diagnosed with appendicitis, he asked his teammate and captain, Traian Georgescu, who was also a surgeon, to perform the operation. His older brother, Ovidiu, was also a footballer, having played for Victoria Cluj, Aurul Brad and Jiul Petroșani, while his nephew, Septimiu, played for Universitatea Cluj. On 13 May 2013, at Cluj Arena during halftime of the match between Universitatea Cluj and CSMS Iași, he was awarded the title of Honorary Citizen of Cluj County - "Clujean of Honor".

Câmpeanu died on 3 April 2021 at the age of 82.

== Honours ==
Flamura Roșie Cluj

- Divizia C: 1958–59

Universitatea Cluj

- Cupa României: 1964–65
