= Constantin Cârstea =

Romanian footballer and coach

Personal information
- Date of birth: 22 February 1949
- Place of birth: Moșoaia, Romania
- Date of death: 16 November 2009 (aged 60)
- Place of death: Smeura, Romania
- Height: 1.76 m (5 ft 9 in)
- Position: Defender

Youth career
- 1961–1970: Argeș Pitești

Senior career*
Years	Team	Apps	(Gls)
1970–1982	Argeș Pitești	244	(8)

International career
1979	Romania	1	(0)

Managerial career
- 1982–1985: Argeș Pitești (assistant)
- 1985: Argeș Pitești
- 1986–1987: Dacia Pitești
- 1987–1988: Olt Scornicești
- 1988–1989: IPA Aluminiu Slatina
- 1990–1991: Argeș Pitești
- 1991–1992: Chimia Râmnicu Vâlcea
- 1992–1993: Gloria Bistrița
- 1994–1995: Gloria Bistrița
- 1995–1996: Argeș Pitești
- 1997–2002: Gloria Bistrița
- 2004–2005: Gloria Bistrița
- 2006: Unirea Alba Iulia
- 2007: Argeș Pitești
- 2007: Mioveni
- 2009: Gloria Buzău
- * Club domestic league appearances and goals

Constantin Cârstea (22 February 1949 – 16 November 2009) was a Romanian footballer who played as a defender. He was also a football coach. As a player he spent his entire professional career with Argeș Pitești.

== Club career ==
Cârstea was born on 22 February 1949 in Moșoaia, Romania and began playing junior-level football in 1961 at Argeș Pitești. He made his Divizia A debut on 8 March 1970 under coach Constantin Teașcă in a 2–1 away loss to Bihor Oradea. In the following two seasons he was in the team's squad but did not play a single league game, this being a period in which the club won the 1971–72 title. He made his debut in European competitions in the 1978–79 UEFA Cup when he helped Argeș eliminate Panathinaikos in the first round with a 5–1 aggregate victory. In the following one they were defeated with 6–4 on aggregate by Valencia, but Cârstea did not play in either game. In the same season he helped the club win the title, being used by coach Florin Halagian in 31 games. In the following season they got past AEK Athens in the first round of the 1979–80 European Cup, the team being eliminated in the following one by title holders and eventual winners, Nottingham Forest. He scored his only goal in European competitions in a 4–0 win over APOEL Nicosia in the 1981–82 UEFA Cup edition. Cârstea's last Divizia A appearance took place on 13 November 1982 in a 3–0 home victory over SC Bacău in which he scored once, totaling 244 matches with eight goals in the competition and 11 games with one goal in European competitions.

== International career ==
Cârstea made one appearance for Romania, playing on 13 May 1979 under coach Florin Halagian in a 1–1 draw against Cyprus in the Euro 1980 qualifiers.

== Managerial career ==
Cârstea began coaching in 1983 when he was the assistant of former teammate and good friend Nicolae Dobrin at Argeș Pitești. In 1985 he became the team's head coach. He spent most of his managerial career coaching in several spells each of Argeș and Gloria Bistrița. He also worked for Dacia Pitești, Olt Scornicești, IPA Aluminiu Slatina, Chimia Râmnicu Vâlcea, Unirea Alba Iulia, Mioveni and Gloria Buzău. His highest achievements were with Gloria Bistrița, first when with the help of technical director Remus Vlad, the club won the first trophy in its history, the 1993–94 Cupa României, after a 1–0 victory over Universitatea Craiova in the final. He also guided Gloria in the first round of the 1994–95 Cup Winners' Cup, where they won the first leg 2–1 against Real Zaragoza but lost the second 4–0; Zaragoza ultimately went on to win the competition.

Cârstea has a total of 428 matches as a manager in the Romanian top-division, Divizia A, consisting of 170 victories, 69 draws and 189 losses.

== Death ==
Cârstea died on 16 November 2009 at age 60 in the Smeura village, part of his native commune, Moșoaia.

== Honours ==
=== Player ===
Argeș Pitești

- Divizia A: 1978–79

=== Manager ===
Gloria Bistrița

- Cupa României: 1993–94
