= Moșoaia =

- Commune
- Location in Romania
- Coordinates: 44°49′N 24°46′E
- Country: Romania
- County: Argeș

Government
  - Mayor (2020–2024): Ion Necula (PNL)
- Area: 44.9 km^{2} (17.3 sq mi)
- Elevation: 405 m (1,329 ft)
- Population (2021-12-01): 7,883
  - Density: 180/km^{2} (450/sq mi)
- Time zone: EET/EEST (UTC+2/+3)
- Postal code: 117505
- Area code: +40 x42
- Vehicle reg.: AG
- Website: www.primariamosoaia.ro

Moșoaia is a commune in Argeș County, Muntenia, Romania. It is composed of seven villages: Bătrâni, Ciocănăi, Dealu Viilor, Hințești, Lăzărești, Moșoaia, and Smeura.

== Natives ==
- Corneliu Bogdan (1921–1990), diplomat
- Constantin Cârstea (1949–2009), football player and manager
- Mihai Zamfir (born 1955), football player and manager
