= 1995–96 Cupa României =

Tournament details
- Country: Romania

Final positions
- Champions: Steaua București
- Runners-up: Gloria Bistrița

The 1995–96 Cupa României was the 58th edition of Romania's most prestigious football cup competition.

The title was won by Steaua București against Gloria Bistrița.

== Format ==
The competition is an annual knockout tournament.

First round proper matches are played on the ground of the lowest ranked team, then from the second round proper the matches are played on a neutral location.

If a match is drawn after 90 minutes, the game goes into extra time. If the match is still tied, the result is decided by penalty kicks.

From the first edition, the teams from Divizia A entered in competition in sixteen finals, rule which remained till today.

== First round proper ==
Team 1	Score	Team 2
16 December 1995
Petrolistul Boldești (Div. C)	0–3	(Div. A) Steaua București
FC Brașov (Div. A)	0–1	(Div. A) Farul Constanța
Tractorul Brașov (Div. B)	1–2	(Div. A) Inter Sibiu
Danubiana București (Div. C)	5–1	(Div. A) Politehnica Timișoara
Dunărea Călărași (Div. B)	0–3	(Div. A) Naţional București
Gloria IRIS Corneşti (Div. C)	0–1	(Div. A) Gloria Bistrița
Petrolul Drăgăşani (Div. C)	1–3	(Div. A) Oțelul Galați
Foresta Fălticeni (Div. B)	1–1 (a.e.t.) (5-3 p)	(Div. A) Rapid București
Gaz Metan Mediaș (Div. B)	4–3 (a.e.t.)	(Div. A) Ceahlăul Piatra Neamț
Petrolul Ploiești (Div. A)	4–1	(Div. A) Universitatea Cluj
CSM Reșița (Div. B)	0–1	(Div. A) Dinamo București
Petrolul Stoina (Div. C)	1–1 (a.e.t.) (6-5 p)	(Div. A) AS Bacău
CFR Timișoara (Div. B)	2–3	(Div. A) Sportul Studenţesc București
ASA 1962 Târgu Mureș (Div. B)	2–0	(Div. A) Politehnica Iași
Sportul Municipal Vaslui (Div. C)	1–3	(Div. A) Argeș Pitești
Armătura Zalău (Div. C)	0–0 (a.e.t.) (5-3 p)	(Div. A) FC U Craiova

== Second round proper ==
Team 1	Score	Team 2
20 December 1995
Dinamo București	1–0	Gaz Metan Mediaș
Naţional București	2–0	ASA 1962 Târgu Mureș
Petrolul Ploiești	2–1	Foresta Fălticeni
Farul Constanța	1–0	Oțelul Galați
Gloria Bistrița	3–1	Armătura Zalău
Steaua București	3–0	Petrolul Stoina
Argeș Pitești	1–0	Danubiana București
Sportul Studenţesc București	0–2	Inter Sibiu

== Quarter-finals ==
Team 1	Score	Team 2
13 March 1996
Gloria Bistrița	2–1	Farul Constanța
Dinamo București	0–1	Steaua București
Naţional București	1–1 (a.e.t.) (3-1 p)	Petrolul Ploiești
Argeș Pitești	1–1 (a.e.t.) (3-4 p)	Inter Sibiu

== Semi-finals ==
Team 1	Score	Team 2
3 April 1996
Gloria Bistrița	2–0	Naţional București
Steaua București	4–1	Inter Sibiu

== Final ==
28 April 1996
18:00 EEST

Steaua București	3–1	Gloria Bistriţa
Ilie 59'; Bucur 77'; Gâlcă 89'	Report	Miszti 44'

Stadionul Naţional, Bucharest
Attendance: 25,000
Referee: Adrian Porumboiu (Romania)
