= 1993–94 Cupa României =

Tournament details
- Country: Romania

Final positions
- Champions: Gloria Bistrița
- Runners-up: FC U Craiova

The 1993–94 Cupa României was the 56th edition of Romania's most prestigious football cup competition.

The title was won by Gloria Bistrița against FC U Craiova.

== Format ==
The competition is an annual knockout tournament.

First round proper matches are played on the ground of the lowest ranked team, then from the second round proper the matches are played on a neutral location.

If a match is drawn after 90 minutes, the game goes into extra time. If the match is still tied, the result is decided by penalty kicks.

From the first edition, the teams from Divizia A entered in competition in sixteen finals, rule which remained till today.

== Round of 32 ==
Team 1	Score	Team 2
7 December 1993
Vrancart Adjud (Div. C)	0–0 (a.e.t.) (2-3 p)	(Div. A) Steaua București
Selena Bacău (Div. B)	3–1	(Div. A) Oțelul Galați
Petrolul Berca (Div. C)	1–0	(Div. A) Sportul Studenţesc București
Poiana Câmpina (Div. C)	2–1	(Div. A) Petrolul Ploiești
ARO Câmpulung (Div. D)	0–0 (a.e.t.) (5-3 p)	(Div. A) Rapid București
Metalurgistul Cugir (Div. C)	0–2	(Div. A) Progresul București
Rapid Miercurea Ciuc (Div. C)	2–1	(Div. A) Electroputere Craiova
Ceahlăul Piatra Neamț (Div. A)	1–2	(Div. A) Dinamo București
Argeș Pitești (Div. B)	2–0	(Div. A) UTA Arad
Gloria Reşiţa (Div. B)	1–3	(Div. A) Gloria Bistrița
Politehnica Timișoara (Div. A)	0–1	(Div. A) Dacia Unirea Brăila
Jiul Petroșani (Div. B)	0–1 (a.e.t.)	(Div. A) Farul Constanța
Cetatea Târgu Neamț (Div. C)	0–3	(Div. A) Inter Sibiu
Severnav Turnu Severin (Div. D)	0–1	(Div. A) FC Brașov
8 December 1993
Sportul Călăraşi (Div. C)	0–0 (a.e.t.) (3-5 p)	(Div. A) Universitatea Cluj
Energia Iernut (Div. D)	0–2	(Div. A) FC U Craiova

== Round of 16 ==
Team 1	Score	Team 2
14 December 1993
Poiana Câmpina	1–1 (a.e.t.) (5-4 p)	Rapid Miercurea Ciuc
Gloria Bistrița	5–0	Petrolul Berca
Farul Constanța	0–5	FC U Craiova
Dinamo București	2–0	Progresul București
Inter Sibiu	1–3 (a.e.t.)	FC Brașov
ARO Câmpulung	1–2	Universitatea Cluj
Argeș Pitești	0–0 (a.e.t.) (4-3 p)	Steaua București
15 December 1993
Selena Bacău	3–0	Dacia Unirea Brăila

== Quarter-finals ==
Team 1	Score	Team 2
2 March 1994
Poiana Câmpina	0–3	Gloria Bistrița
Selena Bacău	0–2	FC U Craiova
Dinamo București	0–1	Argeș Pitești
FC Brașov	0–0 (a.e.t.) (5-6 p)	Universitatea Cluj

== Semi-finals ==
Team 1	Score	Team 2
12 March 1994
FC U Craiova	1–0	Argeș Pitești
Universitatea Cluj	1–4 (a.e.t.)	Gloria Bistrița

== Final ==
30 April 1994
17:00 EEST

Gloria Bistriţa	1–0	Universitatea Craiova
Ilea 26'	Report

Stadionul Regie, Bucharest
Attendance: 7,000
Referee: Adrian Porumboiu (Romania)

Cupa României 1993–94 winners

1st title
