= ACF Gloria Bistrița =

Association football club in Romania

Gloria Bistrița
- Full name: Asociația Club de Fotbal Gloria Bistrița
- Nicknames: Vampirii albaștri (The Blue Vampires); Alb-albaștrii (The White and Blues); Glorioșii (The Glorious Ones); Echipa lui Dracula (Dracula's Squad)
- Short name: Gloria
- Founded: 6 July 1922; 103 years ago
- Dissolved: 2015
- Ground: Jean Pădureanu
- Capacity: 7,800
- Website: https://www.gloria-bistrita.ro
Home colours	Away colours	Third colours

Asociația Club de Fotbal Gloria Bistrița (Romanian pronunciation: [ˈɡlori.a ˈbistritsa]), commonly known as Gloria Bistrița, or simply as Gloria, was a Romanian professional football club based in Bistrița, Bistrița-Năsăud County founded on 6 July 1922 and dissolved in 2015.

== History ==
Chart of yearly table positions of Gloria Bistrița in the national leagues.

The club was founded on 6 July 1922, and among its founding staff were Simion Sbârcea as president, Teofil Moldovan as secretary, and Ion Bota, Leon Bârsan, Dumitru Hara, Simion Pop, Ioan Archiudean, and others as members of the club's administration committee.

Throughout its earlier history, the club had several other names: Ceramica Bistrița (before World War II), CS Bistrița (after World War II) and Progresul Bistrița until 1956, when the old name, Gloria, was readopted.

In the 1954 season, the team participated in the Liga II promotion playoffs but missed on the promotion, in spite of the fact that, at that time, Progresul had on its team future Romania national team players, Anton and Dumitru Munteanu brothers.

Gloria promoted to Divizia B at the end of the 1957–58 season after winning Series IV of Divizia C. The team also reached the Round of 16 in Cupa României, after eliminating first-division side CS Târgu Mureș 5–2, but lost 2–3 to CS Oradea. The squad included Radu, Kaiser, Ivanenco, Covaci, Țiriac, Vasilescu, Botescu, Ilie Copil, Marin Vasile, Firică, Zeană and Rădulescu.

In the 1958–59 season, coached by Gheorghe Nuțescu, Gloria ranked last in Series II of Divizia B but was spared from relegation due to the expansion of the second division. Nuțescu continued to lead the team until mid-season of the 1959–60 campaign, when he was replaced by Adalbert Pall, who guided Gloria to a 9th-place finish in Series I.

Pall remained in charge during the first half of the 1960–61 season but was replaced midway by Gheorghe Nuțescu, who returned to the bench and led the team until the end of the campaign, which concluded with relegation to the Regional Championship after a 13th-place finish in Series III.

During the 1962–63 season, Gloria Bistrița, once again guided by Gheorghe Nuțescu, won the Cluj Regional Championship and promoted to Divizia C, where they competed in the North Series. Gloria ranked 3rd in 1963–64, finished as runners-up in 1964–65, but unexpectedly relegated at the end of the 1965–66 season after finishing 13th.

In the 1966–67 campaign, Gloria once again won the Cluj Regional Championship after finishing 1st in the Someș Series and defeating CFR Cluj, winners of the Mureș Series, in the regional final (1–1 away and 2–1 home). However, they lost the promotion play-off against Știința Târgu Mureș, champions of the Mureș Region, 2–1 at home and 0–2 away.

Gloria returned to Divizia C at the end of the following season, after once again winning the Someș Series of the Cluj Regional Championship and earning direct promotion due to the expansion of the third tier. In Divizia C, Gloria played in Series VII and finished 4th in the 1968–69 season.

The following season, Gloria won the series and qualified for the promotion play-off, finishing 2nd in Promotion Group II held in Arad, behind UM Timișoara and ahead of Minaur Zlatna and Tractorul Brașov, thus returning to the second division after nearly a decade. Constantin Popescu had at his disposal the following players Bocșa, Barta, Pădureanu, Cîțu, Rusu, Pantelimon, Moldovan, Greavu, Olteanu, Pop, Iuliu Ciocan, Treabă, Victor Ciocan, Mureșan, Dinu, Schim and Kadar.

After the relegation at the end of the 1973–74 season, when the team ranked last in Series III, Gloria finally earned promotion for the third time under Gheorghe Nuțescu’s reign during the 1974–75 season. The team then played in Divizia B for fifteen consecutive years, between 1975 and 1990, featuring many valuable players such as Daniel Iftodi, Gheorghe Hurloi, Victor Ciocan, and others.

=== Promotion in top division and European cups ===
Gloria earned promotion to the Romanian top league at the end of the 1989–90 season by winning Series III of the second division under coach Remus Vlad, and subsequently competed at that level without interruption until 2011. During this time, the club also gave Romanian football remarkable players such as Viorel Moldovan, Gavril Balint, Lucian Sânmărtean, Ciprian Tătărușanu, Emilian Dolha, Cristian Coroian, and others. After beginning somewhat shyly in the top division, in 1993 Gloria finished in fifth place and managed to achieve their premiere qualification for a European international competition, the UEFA Cup. They drew 0–0 with Maribor at home, but were eliminated after a 2–0 defeat on the road in the second leg. In 1994, Gloria Bistrița won the Romanian Cup after defeating Universitatea Craiova by a score of 1–0. Despite finishing in seventh place, thanks to their cup final win, Gloria qualified for the UEFA Cup Winners' Cup. They beat the future UEFA Cup Winners' Cup winners Real Zaragoza 2–1 in Bistrița, but were eliminated after losing 4–0 at the Estadio La Romareda. After an absence of one season, although having finished in 12th place, Gloria returned to the UEFA Cup Winners' Cup after losing 3–1 in the final of the Romanian Cup against league champions Steaua București. They qualified past the inaugural round after defeating Valletta FC by scores of 2–1 in both legs. In the first round proper, Gloria drew 1–1 in Bistrița against Italian giants Fiorentina, but were eliminated by losing 1–0 in Florence.

In 1997, Gloria made its debut in the UEFA Intertoto Cup. At the group stage, playing in group 10, they finished in fourth place (out of 5 teams), having lost against Montpellier (1–2), Čukarički Stankom (3–2) and Groningen (4–1) and having won against Spartak Varna (2–1). In 2000, Gloria won Cupa Ligii, 3–1 on penalties, after having drawn 2–2 after extra time against FCM Bacau. They then failed to qualify for the second round of the 2001 Intertoto Cup after losing 1–0 to Jazz Pori in Finland and winning 2–1 in Bistrița. In 2002, Gloria qualified for the third round for the first time after eliminating Union Luxembourg (2–1 in Bistrița and 0–0 in Luxembourg) and Teuta Durrës (3–0 in Bistrița and 0–1 in Albania), but were eliminated by Lille (2–0 in both legs). In 2003, Gloria Bistrița finished the league season tied on points with FC Brasov in third place, the club's best ever performance, and qualified for the second round of the Intertoto Cup after eliminating Bangor City (0–1 in Wales and 5–2 in Bistrița), but the team was eventually eliminated by Brescia (1–2 in Italy and 1–1 in Bistrița).

In 2005, Gloria earned its best European results ever against Olympiakos Nicosia: 5–0 in Cyprus (its best away European victory) and 11–0 in Bistrița (its best home European victory). In 2007, Gloria finished its business with European competitions. In the 2007 Intertoto Cup, they eliminated OFK Grbalj (2–1 in Bistrița and 1–1 in Montenegro) and Maccabi Haifa (2–0 in Bistrița and 0–2 in Israel, 3–2 on penalties), but then lost the Cup final match (in the Southern-Mediterranean region) against Atlético Madrid. Even though they beat Atlético, 2–1 in Bistrița, they lost 1–0 in Madrid, and so, 2–2 on aggregate, the Spanish prevailed on the away goals rule.

After 2007, Gloria changed its objective, from European competitions to avoiding relegation. In 2011, Gloria was relegated in Liga II after failing to achieve a license for the next season.

=== Insolvency ===
Gloria's funding problems worsened. However, Gloria Bistrița resisted on the pitch, and finished runner-up in the second division, thereby earning promotion to Liga I once again, under the leadership of coach Nicolae Manea. In the following season, however, Gloria had the worst record in first division, finishing 18th, and were relegated yet again. After the second relegation, Manea left the club to coach Corona Brașov, taking with him former Gloria strikers, Cristian Coroian and Sandu Negrean, as technical director and head coach respectively, with the stated objective of gaining promotion.

On 25 July 2014, Gloria was relegated to Liga III, due to many financial problems, and changed its name from ACF Gloria 1922 Bistrița to Gloria Progresul Bistrița.

On 3 August 2015, the club was relegated to Liga V, due to many financial problems, and went bankrupt.

=== Successors ===
Academia Gloria logo.

After the bankruptcy of ACF Gloria 1922 Bistriţa, a new club was formed, AF Gloria Bistrița, also known as Academia Gloria, club that wanted to continue the football tradition of Gloria and had also a short term rivalry with FC Bistrița, another team that wanted to fight for the supremacy in the town. Eventually FC Bistrița won the battle and promoted to Liga III, but due to lack of funds the team retired in the second part of the season and dissolved soon after. The death of the one who led Gloria for decades, Jean Pădureanu, seemed to be the last hammer blow for the football in Bistrița. Academia Gloria was a disputed project from its beginning, the new logo that depicted an ostrich with a ball at its feet has long been challenged by both media and supporters. Even if the team managed to promote from Liga V to Liga IV in its first year, has been stuck to this level for next two. The lack of results, the lack of interest in getting the ACF Gloria 1922 Bistriţa brand (to become the official successor) and the lack of professionalism at the level of management have removed both supporters and local authorities from this team, which was finally dissolved in the summer of 2018.

In the summer of 2018 when it seemed the situation had already a note of apathy and resignation, ACS Dumitra, a multiple champion of the Bistrița-Năsăud County and also the champion of the last season, announced that it changed its name to 1. FC Gloria Bistrița. The new president of the club was named Ioan Horoba, who was also the sporting director of ACF Gloria 1922 Bistriţa, in Pădureanu's era. In the squad were found players who have been successful with the old club such as: Sergiu Costin, Alin Chibulcutean, Sergiu Mândrean or Adrian Nalați.Founded on 31 May 2018 under the name of 1. FC Gloria, the team is considered as the unofficial successor of ACF Gloria Bistrița, both by supporters, the media, but also the club itself assuming this status. The team has a similar name, same colors (white and blue), is playing on the same stadium, also having former directors, managers and players of the old club involved in the destiny of the new entity. 1. FC Gloria also announced that in the future would like to buy ACF Gloria 1922 Bistriţa brand and to become its official successor.

== Stadium ==
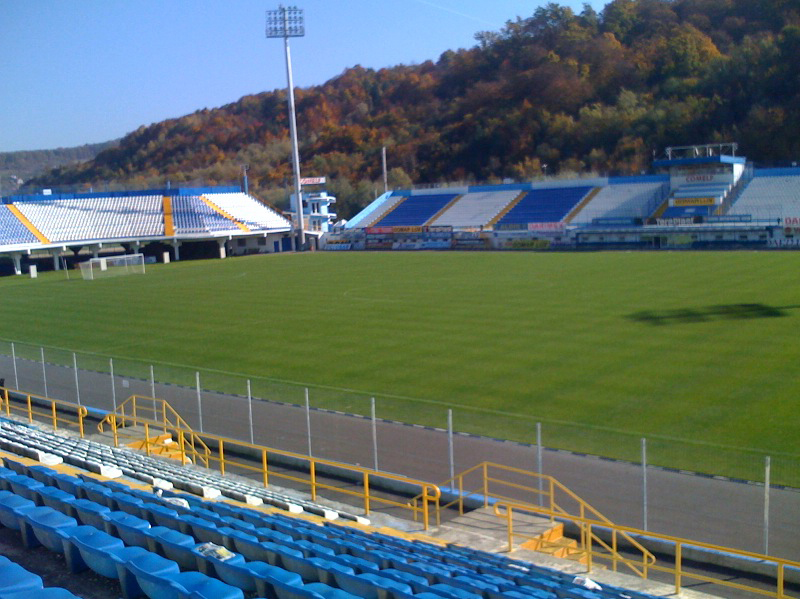

The stadium was inaugurated in 1930 and modernized in 2008. It was called Stadionul Municipal Gloria, before being named after the most important person in the club's history, Jean Pădureanu. The stadium has a total capacity of 7,800 seats.

== European record ==
Competition	S	P	W	D	L	GF	GA	GD
UEFA Cup Winners' Cup / European Cup Winners' Cup	2	6	3	1	2	7	9	−2
UEFA Europa League / UEFA Cup	1	2	0	1	1	0	2	−2
UEFA Intertoto Cup	7	28	11	4	13	46	33	+13
Total	10	36	14	6	16	53	44	+9

== Statistics by competition ==
=== UEFA Cup Winners' Cup / European Cup Winners' Cup ===
Season	Round	Country	Club	Home	Away	Aggregate
1994–95	First round	Spain	Real Zaragoza	2–1	0–4	2–5
1996–97	Qualifying round	Malta	Valletta	2–1	2–1	4–2
1996–97	First round	Italy	Fiorentina	1–1	0–1	1–2

=== UEFA Europa League / UEFA Cup ===
Season	Round	Country	Club	Home	Away	Aggregate
1993–94	First round	Slovenia	NK Maribor	0–0	0–2	0–2

=== UEFA Intertoto Cup ===
Season	Round	Country	Club	Home	Away	Aggregate
1997	Group stage (10)	France	Montpellier	1–2		4th place
1997	Group stage (10)	(Serbia and Montenegro) Yugoslavia	Čukarički Stankom		2–3	4th place
1997	Group stage (10)	Bulgaria	Spartak Varna	2–1		4th place
1997	Group stage (10)	Netherlands	Groningen		1–4	4th place
2001	First round	Finland	FC Jazz	2–1	0–1	2–2 (a)
2002	First round	Luxembourg	Union Luxembourg	2–0	0–0	2–0
2002	Second round	Albania	Teuta	3–0	0–1	3–1
2002	Third round	France	Lille	0–2	0–1	0–3
2003	First round	Wales	Bangor City F.C.	5–2	1–0	6–2
2003	Second round	Italy	Brescia Calcio	1–1	1–2	2–3
2004	First round	Switzerland	FC Thun	0–0	0–2	0–2
2005	First round	Cyprus	Olympiakos Nicosia	11–0	5–0	16–0
2005	Second round	Croatia	NK Slaven Belupo	0–1	2–3	2–4
2007	First round	Montenegro	Grbalj	2–1	1–1	3–2
2007	Second round	Israel	Maccabi Haifa	(aet) 0–2	2–0	2–2 (3–2 p)
2007	Third round	Spain	Atlético Madrid	2–1	1–0	2–2 (a)

== Former managers ==
- (Romania) Augustin Botescu (1956)
- (Romania) Gheorghe Nuțescu (1958–1959)
- (Romania) Adalbert Pall (1960)
- (Romania) Gheorghe Nuțescu (1961)
- (Romania) Virgil Mărdărescu (1961–1962)
- (Romania) Gheorghe Nuțescu (1962–1963)
- (Romania) Constantin Popescu (1968–1974)
- (Romania) Gheorghe Nuțescu (1974–1975)
- (Romania) Ion Nunweiller (1981–1983)
- (Romania) Ilie Savu (1984–1985)
- (Romania) Constantin Cernăianu (1987–1988)
- (Romania) Remus Vlad (1990–1992)
- (Romania) Constantin Cârstea (1992–1993)
- (Romania) Remus Vlad (1994)
- (Romania) Constantin Cârstea (1994–1996)
- (Romania) Remus Vlad (1996–1997)
- (Romania) Constantin Cârstea (1997–2002)
- (Romania) Remus Vlad (2002–2004)
- (Romania) Constantin Cârstea (2004–05)
- (Romania) Ioan Sabău (July 2005 – June 2009)
- (Romania) Sandu Tăbârcă (July 2009 – Oct 09)
- (Romania) Florin Halagian (Oct 2009)
- (Romania) Marian Pană (Oct 2009 – Dec 09)
- (Romania) Marius Șumudică (Jan 2010 – May 10)
- (Romania) Laurențiu Reghecampf (June 2010 – Oct 10)
- (Romania) Nicolae Manea (Oct 2010 – April 2011)
- (Romania) Florin Halagian (April 2011)
- (Romania) Nicolae Manea (April 2011 – June 2013)
- (Romania) Sandu Negrean (June 2013 – March 2014)
- (Romania) Cristian Coroian (March 2014 – September 2014)
- (Romania) Valer Săsărman (September 2014 – August 2015)

== Club honours ==
=== Championships ===
Liga I

- Best finish 3rd 2002–03

Liga II

- Winners (1): 1989–90
- Runners-up (8): 1976–77, 1978–79, 1980–81, 1981–82, 1983–84, 1984–85, 1987–88, 2011–12

Liga III

- Winners (3): 1957–58, 1969–70, 1974–75
- Runners-up (1): 1964–65

Cluj Regional Championship

- Winners (5): 1954, 1956, 1962–63, 1966–67, 1967–68

=== Cups ===
Cupa României

- Winners (1): 1993–94
- Runners-up (1): 1995–96

Cupa Ligii

- Winners (1): 2000

Supercupa României

- Runners-up (1): 1994

=== European ===
UEFA Intertoto Cup

- Runners-up (1): 2007

== Club records in Liga 1 ==
Club records in Liga 1 dating from the past 20 years

Longest winning run

- 5 matches, June 10, 1995 – August 19, 1995

Longest unbeaten run

- 7 matches, March 22, 1997 – May 3, 1997

Biggest wins

- 5–0 against Rapid București, 1990–91 season
- 5–0 against Jiul Petroșani, 1990–91 season
- 5–0 against Sportul Studențesc, 1993–94 season
- 6–1 against FC Maramureș, 1994–95 season
- 5–0 against Oțelul Galați, 1996–97 season
- 0–5 against Jiul Petroșani, 1997–98 season
- 5–0 against Foresta Suceava, 1998–99 season
- 6–1 against Unirea Alba Iulia, 2004–05 season
- 5–0 against Politehnica Iași, 2009–10 season

Biggest losses

- 0–6 against Progresul București, 1994–95 season
- 0–6 against UTA Arad, 2002–03 season
- 0–6 against Brașov, 2009–10 season

Most played games

- Victor Ciocan – over 600

Most goals

- Victor Ciocan – 426
