= 1991–92 FC Dinamo București season =

FC Dinamo București
1991–92 season
- Manager: Florin Halagian
- Divizia A: 1st
- Romanian Cup: Last 16
- UEFA Cup: Second round
- Top goalscorer: Gábor Gerstenmájer (21 goals)

The 1991–92 season was FC Dinamo București's 43rd season in Divizia A. The year 1992 brings the 14th Divizia A title in history. Dinamo dominated the season from start to finish and ended without a single loss. The newcomers Gábor Gerstenmájer and Albanian Sulejman Demollari made an instant impact, scoring together 39 goals in league only. The technical staff was formed from Florin Halagian – head coach, Viorel Hizo and Florin Cheran – assistants, and Dutch Rinus Israel – technical director.

In Europe, Dinamo entered the UEFA Cup and in the first round passed by Sporting CP, but was stopped in the second round by another club from Genoa. After Sampdoria, now Genoa C.F.C.

== Results ==
Divizia A
Round	Date	Opponent	Stadium	Result
1	25 August 1991	Petrolul Ploieşti	H	6–0
2	1 September 1991	Sportul Studențesc	A	1–1
3	8 September 1991	Inter Sibiu	H	5–0
4	12 September 1991	Farul Constanța	A	0–0
5	22 September 1991	Politehnica Timişoara	H	4–1
6	26 September 1991	U Craiova	A	3–1
7	6 October 1991	Steaua București	H	1–0
8	9 October 1991	FC Argeș	A	1–0
9	19 October 1991	FC Brașov	H	5–2
10	27 October 1991	Rapid București	A	3–0
11	31 October 1991	Dacia Unirea Brăila	H	2–1
12	24 November 1991	ASA Târgu Mureș	A	1–0
13	30 November 1991	Oțelul Galați	H	4–1
14	4 December 1991	Electroputere Craiova	A	0–0
15	8 December 1991	FC Bacău	H	3–0
16	11 December 1991	Gloria Bistrița	H	2–1
17	15 December 1991	Corvinul Hunedoara	A	1–1
18	8 March 1992	FC Ploiești	A	4–0
19	15 March 1992	Sportul Studențesc	H	1–0
20	22 March 1992	Inter Sibiu	A	2–2
21	29 March 1992	Farul Constanța	H	4–0
22	4 April 1992	Politehnica Timişoara	A	0–0
23	12 April 1992	U Craiova	H	2–0
24	19 April 1992	Steaua București	A	1–1
25	25 April 1992	FC Argeș	H	3–1
26	29 April 1992	FC Brașov	A	0–0
27	9 May 1992	Rapid București	H	4–4
28	13 May 1992	Dacia Unirea Brăila	A	1–1
29	24 May 1992	ASA Târgu Mureș	H	2–0
30	31 May 1992	Oțelul Galați	A	2–2
31	7 June 1992	Electroputere Craiova	H	1–0
32	14 June 1992	FC Bacău	A	1–1
33	17 June 1992	Gloria Bistrița	A	1–1
34	21 June 1992	Corvinul Hunedoara	H	5–1

Divizia A 1991–92 Winners
Dinamo București
14th Title

Cupa României
Round	Date	Opponent	Stadium	Result
Last 32	1 March 1992	Foresta Brebu	Brebu	3–1
Last 16	11 March 1992	Sportul Studențesc	București	0–1

== UEFA Cup ==
First round

18 September 1991
21:00

Sporting CP	1–0	Dinamo București
Yordanov 76'

Estádio José Alvalade, Lisbon
Referee: Michel Piraux (Belgium)

2 October 1991
14:30

Dinamo București	2–0 (a.e.t.)	Sporting CP
Gerstenmájer 75', 115'

Stadionul Dinamo, Bucharest
Referee: Bo Karlsson (Sweden)

Dinamo București won 2–1 on aggregate.

Second round

23 October 1991
20:30

Genoa	3–1	Dinamo București
Aguilera 15', 59' (pen.); Branco 22'		Munteanu 88'

Stadio Luigi Ferraris, Genoa
Referee: Leif Sundell (Sweden)

6 November 1991
13:30

Dinamo București	2–2	Genoa
Gerstenmájer 68'; Cristea 89'		Matei 8' (o.g.); Aguilera 53'

Stadionul Dinamo, Bucharest
Referee: Ray Lewis (England)

Genoa won 5-3 on aggregate.

== Squad ==
Goalkeepers: Bogdan Stelea (11 / 0); Costel Câmpeanu (1 / 0); Florin Tene (21 / 0); Perlat Musta (Albania) (2 / 0).
Defenders: Iulian Mihăescu (27 / 1); Marian Pană (24 / 0); Gheorghe Mihali (30 / 0); Tibor Selymes (27 / 0); Adrian Matei (16 / 0); Tudorel Cristea (13 / 1); Anton Doboș (4 / 0); Marius Răduță (7 / 0).
Midfielders: Marius Cheregi (28 / 4); Gábor Gerstenmájer (30 / 21); Zoltán Kádár (29 / 1); Costel Pană (29 / 7); Dorinel Munteanu (33 / 12); Sebastian Moga (32 / 4); Cristinel Atomulesei (8 / 0); Marius Priseceanu (4 / 0); George Visalom (1 / 0).
Forwards: Sulejman Demollari (Albania) (30 / 18); Daniel Scînteie (7 / 3); Gheorghe Pena (1 / 0); Nelson Mensah (Ghana) (12 / 2); Cristian Sava (14 / 1).
(league appearances and goals listed in brackets)

Manager: Florin Halagian.

== Transfers ==
Dinamo brought Sebastian Moga (Gloria Bistriţa), Gheorghe Mihali and Dorinel Munteanu (Inter Sibiu), Zoltan Kadar (U Cluj) and Gábor Gerstenmájer (FC Braşov). Dinamo transferred the first foreign players in the history: the Albanians Sulejman Demollari (Dinamo Tirana) and Perlat Musta (Partizani Tirana) along with Ghanaian Nelson Mensah.

In the summer break Vasile Miriuță was sold to Gloria Bistriţa and Marian Damaschin left for Feyenoord Rotterdam.

In the winter break, Anton Doboş was sold to Steaua, Bogdan Stelea to RCD Mallorca, Costel Câmpeanu to Gloria Bistriţa in exchange for Florin Tene.

== See also ==
- List of unbeaten football club seasons
