= 1992–93 FC Dinamo București season =

FC Dinamo București
1991–92 season
- Head coach: Florin Halagian (until 5 October); Alexandru Moldovan (5 October-3 May); Florin Halagian & Alexandru Moldovan (from 3 May)
- Divizia A: 2nd
- Romanian Cup: Last 8
- Champions League: Second round
- Top goalscorer: Dorinel Munteanu (15 goals)

The 1992–93 season was FC Dinamo București's 44th season in Divizia A. Dinamo finished second in the championship, four points behind rivals Steaua. Before the 29th day, Dinamo and Steaua had the same number of points, but Dinamo lost the next match, at home, against Selena Bacău, then won only six points in the final five games.

After the title won the year before, Dinamo entered the newly-formed UEFA Champions League and in the first round eliminated Kuusysi Lahti from Finland, but lost in the second round against Olympique de Marseille, the eventual winner of the competition.

== Results ==
Divizia A
Round	Date	Opponent	Stadium	Result	Goals for Dinamo
1	16 August 1992	Politehnica Timișoara	H	4–0	Demollari (32,61), Gerstenmajer (34,88)
2	23 August 1992	Dacia Unirea Brăila	A	1–1	Munteanu (32)
3	30 August 1992	Inter Sibiu	H	4–0	Kadar (2), Gerstenmajer (44), Demollari (45), Munteanu (75)
4	2 September 1992	Farul Constanța	A	2–2	Selymes (47), Munteanu (53)
5	6 September 1992	Gloria Bistrița	H	4–1	Munteanu (22), Gerstenmajer (25), Moga (77, 86)
6	11 September 1992	FC Brașov	A	2–0	Munteanu (40), Mihali (63)
7	20 September 1992	Rapid București	H	2–1	Mensah (10), Mihali (78)
8	26 September 1992	Steaua București	A	0–1	
9	4 October 1992	Oțelul Galați	H	2–1	Gerstenmajer (24), Moga (27)
10	17 October 1992	FC Ploiești	A	1–0	Gerstenmajer (47)
11	25 October 1992	Universitatea Cluj	H	3–0	Kadar (1), Hanganu (37), Gerstenmajer (73)
12	30 October 1992	Selena Bacău	A	0–0	
13	8 November 1992	Progresul București	H	7–0	Hanganu (43,59,86), Gerstenmajer (70), Kadar (82), Munteanu (84), Selymes (88)
14	21 November 1992	CSM Reșița	A	2–1	Munteanu (57), Kadar (59)
15	2 December 1992	Electroputere Craiova	H	2–0	Gerstenmajer (14,34)
16	6 December 1992	Universitatea Craiova	H	5–1	Munteanu (29), Gerstenmajer (38,79), Hanganu (57), Kadar (74)
17	9 December 1992	Sportul Studenţesc	A	3–0	Kadar (29,43), Demollari (46)
18	14 March 1993	Politehnica Timișoara	A	2–0	Munteanu (16), Kadar (85)
19	21 March 1993	Dacia Unirea Brăila	H	2–1	Mihali (51), Munteanu (55)
20	25 March 1993	Inter Sibiu	A	1–1	Cheregi (51)
21	28 March 1993	Farul Constanța	H	3–2	Kadar (21,34), Selymes (69)
22	4 April 1993	Gloria Bistrița	A	2–1	C. Pană (55), M. Pană (86)
23	7 April 1993	FC Brașov	H	3–0	C. Pană (32), Demollari (62), Hanganu (87)
24	17 April 1993	Rapid București	A	0–2	
25	25 April 1993	Steaua București	H	1–1	Hanganu (54)
26	2 May 1993	Oțelul Galați	A	3–0	Hanganu (63), Munteanu (78 p, 89)
27	8 May 1993	Petrolul Ploiești	H	5–0	Demollari (4), Hanganu (45), Munteanu (59p), Priseceanu (70), Mensah (84)
28	16 May 1993	Universitatea Cluj	A	2–0	Munteanu (63), Demollari (75)
29	23 May 1993	Selena Bacău	H	0–1	
30	6 June 1993	Progresul București	A	1–1	Priseceanu (69)
31	9 June 1993	CSM Reșița	H	6–0	Hanganu (10,56, 63), C. Pană (19), Savu (85), Selymes (65)
32	13 June 1993	Electroputere Craiova	A	1–1	Priseceanu (49)
33	16 June 1993	Universitatea Craiova	A	1–2	Munteanu (53)
34	20 June 1993	Sportul Studențesc	H	4–2	Priseceanu (7,37), Mensah (43), Mihali (67)

Cupa României
Round	Date	Opponent	Stadium	Result	Goals for Dinamo
Last 32	28 February 1993	Danubiana București	București	8–1	Mihali 18, Demollari 21,54,85, C. Pană 30, Selymes 61, Kadar 81, Munteanu 83
Last 16	17 March 1993	Universitatea Cluj	Oradea	2–3	Hanganu (27), Demollari (86p)

== UEFA Champions League ==
First round

16 September 1992
19:00

Kuusysi (Finland)	1–0	(Romania) Dinamo București
Rinne 16'	Report

Lahden kisapuisto, Lahti
Attendance: 1,330
Referee: Wilfred Wallace (Republic of Ireland)

30 September 1992
15:30

Dinamo București (Romania)	2–0 (a.e.t.)	(Finland) Kuusysi
Gerstenmájer 64'; Demollari 116'	Report

Stadionul Dinamo, Bucharest
Attendance: 9,000
Referee: Stavros Zakestidis (Greece)

Dinamo București won 2–1 on aggregate.

Second round

21 October 1992
18:00

Dinamo București (Romania)	0–0	(France) Marseille
	Report

Stadionul Dinamo, Bucharest
Attendance: 45,000
Referee: Peter Mikkelsen (Denmark)

4 November 1992
19:00

Marseille (France)	2–0	(Romania) Dinamo București
Bokšić 32', 68'	Report

Stade Vélodrome, Marseille
Attendance: 25,000
Referee: Arcangelo Pezzella (Italy)

Marseille won 2–0 on aggregate.

== Squad ==
Goalkeepers: Florin Prunea (22/0), Florin Tene (9/0), Perlat Musta (3/0).

Defenders: Zoltan Kadar (34/10), Gheorghe Mihali (32/4), Tibor Selymes (30/4), Adrian Matei (25/0), Vasile Jercălău (17/0), Leontin Grozavu (12/0), Marian Pană (9/1), Tudorel Cristea (2/0).

Midfielders: Dorinel Munteanu (34/15), Costel Pană (26/3), Daniel Timofte (26/0), Marius Cheregi (25/1), Sebastian Moga (23/3), Gábor Gerstenmájer (16/12), Marius Priseceanu (14/5), Cristian Sava (1/0), Eugen Popiştaşu (1/0), Cezar Dinu (1/0).

Forwards: Ovidiu Hanganu (33/12), Sulejman Demollari (27/7), Nelson Mensah (9/3), Marian Savu (5/1).

== Transfers ==
Cezar Dinu, Leontin Grozavu, Ovidiu Hanganu and Eugen Popistașu were the new players brought by Dinamo. Anton Doboş, Iulian Mihăescu, Cristinel Atomulesei, Gabriel Răduță, George Visalom, Gheorghe Pană, Daniel Scînteie left the club.
