= Cezar Zamfir =

Romanian footballer

Personal information
- Full name: Iulius Cezar Zamfir
- Date of birth: 27 October 1966 (age 60)
- Place of birth: Bucharest, Romania
- Height: 1.68 m (5 ft 6 in)
- Position: Midfielder

Senior career*
Years	Team	Apps	(Gls)
1985–1987	Progresul București		
1987	Dinamo București	0	(0)
1988–1989	Inter Sibiu (Note: The statistics for the 1987–88 Divizia B season are unavailable.)	27	(3)
1989–1990	Dinamo București	38	(6)
1991	Inter Sibiu	19	(2)
1991–1998	Rapid București	175	(20)
1998–1999	Gloria Bistrița	20	(0)
1999–2000	Sportul Studențesc		
Total		275	(31)

Managerial career
- 1999–2010: Sportul Studențesc (assistant)
- 2003: Sportul Studențesc
- 2006: Sportul Studențesc (caretaker)
- 2007: Sportul Studențesc
- 2010–2011: Astra Ploiești (assistant)
- 2011: FCM Târgu Mureș (assistant)
- 2011: Astra Ploiești (assistant)
- 2013–2014: Astra Giurgiu (assistant)
- 2017: ASA Târgu Mureș (assistant)
- 2017–2018: Miercurea Ciuc (assistant)
- 2018–2019: Sportul Snagov (assistant)
- 2019: Metaloglobus București (assistant)
- 2019–2022: UTA Arad (assistant)
- 2022–2023: UTA Arad (assistant)
- 2024: Petrolul Ploiești (assistant)
- 2025–2026: ASA Târgu Mureș (assistant)
- * Club domestic league appearances and goals

Iulius Cezar Zamfir (born 27 October 1966) is a Romanian former professional footballer who played as a midfielder.

== Playing career ==
Zamfir was born on 27 October 1966 in Bucharest, Romania and began playing football in 1985 at local club Progresul. In 1987, he joined Dinamo București, but left mid-season to play for Divizia B side Inter Sibiu, helping them achieve first league promotion at the end of the season. Subsequently, Zamfir made his Divizia A debut under coach Constantin Ardeleanu on 21 August 1988 in a 0–0 draw against Universitatea Cluj. He helped Inter Sibiu win the 1990–91 Balkans Cup while working with coach Viorel Hizo. In 1989, Zamfir went back to Dinamo and won The Double in his first season, playing 21 league matches under coach Mircea Lucescu, scoring six goals, including the third goal of a 3–0 victory against rivals Steaua București. He also played seven matches in the 1989–90 European Cup Winners' Cup, helping the team reach the semi-finals where they were eliminated after a 2–0 aggregate loss to Anderlecht. Then he played four games in the 1990–91 European Cup campaign, as Dinamo got past St Patrick's Athletic in the first round, being defeated by Porto in the following round.

In the middle of the 1990–91 season, Zamfir made a comeback to Inter Sibiu. In 1991, he went to play for Rapid București. His first performance there was reaching the 1995 Cupa României final, where he played the entire match under coach Sorin Cârțu in the loss to Petrolul Ploiești. Rapid reached another Cupa României final in 1998, but coach Lucescu did not use Zamfir in the 1–0 victory against Universitatea Craiova. He appeared in 12 UEFA Cup games for The Railwaymen, most notably helping his side eliminate Charleroi in the first round of the 1994–95 edition. In 1998, Zamfir joined Gloria Bistrița where he made his last Divizia A appearances, totaling 275 matches with 31 goals in the competition. He ended his career after playing in the 1999–2000 Divizia B season for Sportul Studențesc.

== Managerial career ==
Zamfir started his managerial career in 1999, working as an assistant at Sportul Studențesc București until 2010, during which he also served as the team's head coach on several occasions. Afterwards he worked as Tibor Selymes's assistant at Astra Ploiești and FCM Târgu Mureș, after they previously worked together at Sportul Studențesc. He also worked as an assistant for Valentin Sinescu, Daniel Isăilă and Florin Marin at Astra Giurgiu. In 2017, he began working as László Balint's assistant coach at ASA Târgu Mureș, Miercurea Ciuc, Sportul Snagov, Metaloglobus București, UTA Arad and Petrolul Ploiești. In 2025, Zamfir became Eusebiu Tudor's assistant at ASA Târgu Mureș.

== Honours ==
Inter Sibiu

- Divizia B: 1987–88
- Balkans Cup: 1990–91

Dinamo București

- Divizia A: 1989–90
- Cupa României: 1989–90

Rapid București

- Cupa României: 1997–98, runner-up 1994–95
