= CS Universitatea Craiova league record by opponent =

Universitatea Craiova is a professional association football club based in Craiova, Romania. The club was founded in 1948 by a group of professors and students from the University of Craiova. The team was promoted for the first to the top league of Romanian football in the 1964–65 season.

CS Universitatea Craiova played their first top league fixture on 30 August 1964 against Steaua București. Since that game they have played in 1010 first league matches and have faced 48 different sides. Their most regular opponents have been Dinamo București, whom they have played against on 64 occasions. The club has won 29 of the league matches against Argeș Pitești which represents the most Craiova have won against any team. They have drawn more matches with Dinamo București than with any other club, with 18 of their meetings finishing without a winner. Steaua București are the side that has defeated Craiova in more league games than any other club, having won 34 of their encounters.

== Key ==
- The table includes results of matches played by Universitatea Craiova in Liga I.
- † Teams with this background and symbol in the "Club" column are competing in the 2017–18 Liga I alongside Universitatea Craiova.
- ‡ Clubs with this background and symbol in the "Club" column are defunct
- The name used for each opponent is the name they had when Universitatea Craiova most recently played a league match against them. Results against each opponent include results against that club under any former name. For example, results against Universitatea Cluj include matches played against Știința Cluj.
- P = matches played; W = matches won; D = matches drawn; L = matches lost; F = goals for; A = goals against; Win% = percentage of total matches won
- The columns headed "First" and "Last" contain the first and most recent seasons in which Universitatea Craiova played league matches against each opponent

== All-time league record ==
Statistics correct as of matches played on season 2016–17.

Opponent	P	W	D	L	F	A	P	W	D	L	F	A	P	W	D	L	F	A	Win%	First	Last	Notes	
Opponent	Home						Away						Total						Win%	First	Last	Notes	
ASA Târgu Mureș ‡	21	18	2	1	49	8		21	5	4	12	18	29		42	23	6	13	67	78	54.76	1967–68	1991–92
ASA Târgu Mureș ‡	3	2	1	0	4	2		3	1	1	1	3	2		6	3	2	1	7	6	50.00	2014–15	2015–16
Argeș Pitești	28	23	4	1	61	19		28	6	4	18	24	46		56	29	8	19	85	107	51.79	1964–65	1991–92
Astra Giurgiu †	4	0	1	3	2	6		4	1	1	2	2	7		8	1	2	5	4	9	12.50	2014–15	2016–17
Bihor Oradea ‡	16	15	1	0	43	9		16	6	2	8	17	19		32	21	3	8	60	62	65.63	1964–65	1990–91
CFR Cluj †	12	6	4	2	26	14		12	2	7	3	7	9		24	8	11	5	33	35	33.33	1969–70	2016–17
CFR Timișoara	1	0	1	0	1	1		1	1	0	0	1	0		2	1	1	0	2	1	50.00	1970–71	1970–71
CS Târgoviște ‡	6	4	2	0	16	1		6	1	1	4	5	8		12	5	3	4	21	24	41.67	1977–78	1983–84
CSM Suceava ‡	1	1	0	0	2	0		1	1	0	0	1	0		2	2	0	0	3	2	100.00	1987–88	1987–88
CSMS Iași †	4	3	0	1	7	3		4	1	0	3	4	7		8	4	0	4	11	14	50.00	2014–15	2015–16
Ceahlăul Piatra Neamț	1	1	0	0	2	0		1	0	0	1	1	2		2	1	0	1	3	4	50.00	2014–15	2014–15
Chimia Râmnicu Vâlcea ‡	10	10	0	0	42	4		10	2	2	6	9	13		20	12	2	6	51	55	60.00	1974–75	1986–87
Concordia Chiajna †	4	2	2	0	6	2		4	1	2	1	4	3		8	3	4	1	10	9	37.50	2014–15	2015–16
Corvinul Hunedoara ‡	15	13	2	0	43	7		15	3	5	7	15	22		30	16	7	7	58	65	53.33	1976–77	1991–92
Dacia Unirea Brăila	2	1	0	1	2	2		2	1	1	0	1	0		4	2	1	1	3	2	50.00	1990–91	1991–92
Dinamo București †	32	15	9	8	44	34		32	1	9	22	23	74		64	16	18	30	67	118	25.00	1964–65	2016–17
Dunărea Galați ‡	5	4	1	0	17	5		5	4	1	0	8	4		10	8	2	0	25	21	80.00	1974–75	1983–84
Electroputere Craiova ‡	1	1	0	0	1	0		1	0	1	0	1	1		2	1	1	0	2	2	50.00	1991–92	1991–92
FC Bacău ‡	24	23	1	0	61	10		24	3	8	13	19	40		48	26	9	13	80	101	54.17	1967–68	1991–92
FC Baia Mare	6	6	0	0	18	2		6	1	2	3	4	6		12	7	2	3	22	24	58.33	1964–65	1984–85
FC Botoșani †	4	3	1	0	5	2		4	0	0	4	3	8		8	3	1	4	8	13	37.50	2014–15	2016–17
FC Brașov	22	18	2	2	42	6		22	2	9	11	12	31		44	20	11	13	54	73	45.45	1964–65	2014–15
FC Voluntari †	3	2	0	1	9	2		3	3	0	0	5	1		6	5	0	1	14	10	83.33	2015–16	2016–17
FCM Reșița	6	5	1	0	13	3		6	0	1	5	6	13		12	5	2	5	19	26	41.67	1972–73	1977–78
Farul Constanța	20	16	3	1	44	13		20	3	2	15	11	36		40	19	5	16	55	80	47.50	1964–65	1991–92
Flacăra Moreni	4	4	0	0	8	0		4	1	0	3	2	7		8	5	0	3	10	15	62.50	1986–87	1989–90
Gaz Metan Mediaș †	2	1	1	0	2	1		2	0	1	1	2	3		4	1	2	1	4	5	25.00	2014–15	2016–17
Gloria Bistrița	2	2	0	0	7	2		2	0	0	2	0	4		4	2	0	2	7	11	50.00	1990–91	1991–92
Gloria Buzău	5	4	1	0	21	2		5	0	2	3	2	6		10	4	3	3	23	27	40.00	1978–79	1986–87
Inter Sibiu ‡	4	2	1	1	8	3		4	0	2	2	1	5		8	2	3	3	9	13	25.00	1988–89	1991–92
Jiul Petroșani	22	17	4	1	43	8		22	1	8	13	16	36		44	18	12	14	59	79	40.91	1966–67	1990–91
Olimpia Satu Mare	5	4	1	0	12	3		5	0	1	4	0	9		10	4	2	4	12	21	40.00	1974–75	1979–80
Olt Scornicești	11	9	1	1	28	8		11	4	3	4	13	11		22	13	4	5	41	39	59.09	1979–80	1989–90
Oțelul Galați	5	2	2	1	6	5		5	1	0	4	3	8		10	3	2	5	9	14	30.00	1986–87	2014–15
Pandurii Târgu Jiu	3	1	2	0	3	2		3	1	1	1	3	3		6	2	3	1	6	6	33.33	2014–15	2015–16
Petrolul Ploiești	22	15	6	1	36	6		22	4	5	13	19	33		44	19	11	14	55	69	43.18	1964–65	2015–16
Politehnica Iași ‡	18	15	2	1	39	9	18	5	7	6	17	22	36	20	9	7	56	61	55.56	1964–65	1984–85		
Politehnica Timișoara †	21	16	4	1	48	6	21	7	6	8	23	23	42	23	10	9	71	71	54.76	1965–66	2015–16		
Progresul București	8	7	1	0	19	3	8	2	1	5	13	14	16	9	2	5	32	33	56.25	1964–65	1981–82		
Rapid București ‡	21	20	1	0	51	9	21	5	6	10	22	32	42	25	7	10	73	83	59.52	1964–65	2014–15		
Siderurgistul Galați ‡	1	1	0	0	3	1	1	0	0	1	1	3	2	1	0	1	4	6	50.00	1965–66	1965–66		
Sportul Studenţesc București	20	16	3	1	45	10	20	3	6	11	19	38	40	19	9	12	64	83	47.50	1972–73	1991–92		
Steaua București †	32	14	8	10	54	48	32	4	4	24	26	65	64	18	12	34	80	119	28.13	1964–65	2016–17		
UTA Arad	16	15	1	0	39	8	16	2	5	9	12	26	32	17	6	9	51	65	53.13	1964–65	1981–82		
Universitatea Cluj	22	16	5	1	52	9	22	7	4	11	18	32	44	23	9	12	70	84	52.27	1964–65	2014–15		
Vagonul Arad ‡	1	0	0	1	1	2	1	0	1	0	4	4	2	0	1	1	5	5	0.00	1968–69	1968–69		
Victoria București ‡	5	3	1	1	11	8	5	2	1	2	3	4	10	5	2	3	14	15	50.00	1985–86	1989–90		
Viitorul Constanța †	4	1	1	2	5	6	4	1	1	2	2	7	8	2	2	4	7	12	25.00	2014–15	2016–17		
