= Dorinel Munteanu =

Romanian footballer and manager

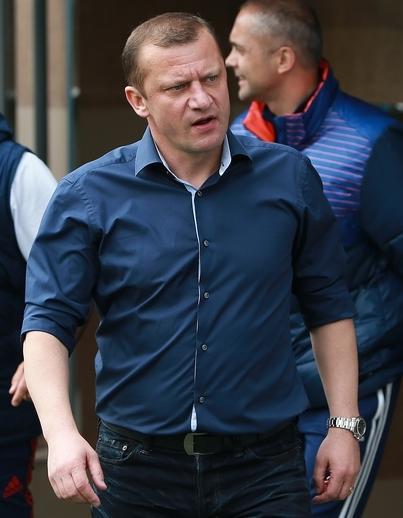
- Munteanu coaching Mordovia Saransk in 2013

Personal information
- Full name: Dorinel Ionel Munteanu
- Date of birth: 25 June 1968 (age 58)
- Place of birth: Grădinari, Romania
- Height: 1.69 m (5 ft 7 in)
- Position: Midfielder

Team information
- Current team: CSM Reșița (head coach)

Senior career*
Years	Team	Apps	(Gls)
1981–1982	Grădinari		
1982–1986	Minerul Oravița		
1986–1987	Metalul Bocșa	13	(0)
1987–1988	CSM Reșița	5	(0)
1988–1989	Olt Scornicești	33	(2)
1989–1991	Inter Sibiu	47	(7)
1991–1993	Dinamo București	67	(27)
1993–1995	Cercle Brugge	65	(12)
1995–1999	1. FC Köln	129	(18)
1999–2003	VfL Wolfsburg	101	(11)
2004–2005	Steaua București	33	(2)
2005–2006	CFR Cluj	26	(0)
2006–2007	Argeș Pitești	3	(0)
2007–2008	Vaslui	16	(0)
2008	Universitatea Cluj	3	(0)
2008	Steaua București	0	(0)
2009	Universitatea Cluj	0	(0)
Total		541	(79)

International career
1988–1990	Romania U21	3	(0)
1991–2007	Romania	134	(16)

Managerial career
- 2004–2005: Steaua București (player/assistant)
- 2005–2006: CFR Cluj (player/coach)
- 2006–2007: Argeș Pitești (player/coach)
- 2007–2008: Vaslui (player/coach)
- 2008: Universitatea Cluj (player/coach)
- 2008: Steaua București (player/coach)
- 2009: Universitatea Cluj (player/coach)
- 2009–2012: Oțelul Galați
- 2012: Dinamo București
- 2012–2013: Mordovia Saransk
- 2013: Kuban Krasnodar
- 2014: Gabala
- 2015: Astra Giurgiu
- 2016–2017: Zakho
- 2017–2018: CSMȘ Reșița (technical director)
- 2018–2019: Concordia Chiajna
- 2019–2020: CSM Reșița
- 2021–2024: Oțelul Galați
- 2025: Sepsi OSK
- 2025–2026: Hermannstadt
- 2026–: CSM Reșița
- * Club domestic league appearances and goals

Dorinel Ionel Munteanu (Romanian pronunciation: [doriˈnel munˈte̯anu]; born 25 June 1968) is a Romanian football manager and former player, currently in charge of Liga II club CSM Reșița.

A former midfielder, Munteanu is the most capped Romanian player of all time, with a total of 134 appearances and 16 goals. He played in two editions of the World Cup, those held in the United States in 1994 and France in 1998, as well as two European Championships, in 1996 and 2000.

== Club career ==
=== Early career ===
Munteanu, nicknamed "Neamțul" (The German), was born on 25 June 1968 in Grădinari, Caraș-Severin County, Romania. He started playing senior level football at age 13, in the Romanian lower leagues at the local club from his native Grădinari. About one year later he played in a friendly against Minerul Oravița which then decided to transfer him. At Oravița, Munteanu made his Divizia C debut under the guidance of coach Eugen Pojoni. Four years later he went to play at Divizia B level for Metalul Bocșa. In 1987 he was close to a move to Politehnica Timișoara but eventually stayed in Divizia B, going to CSM Reșița.

=== Olt Scornicești and Inter Sibiu ===
In 1988, Munteanu joined Olt Scornicești where on 21 August he made his Divizia A debut under coach Silviu Stănescu in a 0–0 away draw against Victoria București.

Afterwards, he signed with Inter Sibiu with which he won the 1990–91 Balkans Cup under coach Viorel Hizo. He also scored seven goals during the 1990–91 domestic league to help his side earn a fourth place.

=== Dinamo București ===
Munteanu's childhood favorite team Dinamo București bought him and Gheorghe Mihali from Inter Sibiu in 1991. In Munteanu's first season, he managed to score 12 goals in the 33 league games coach Florin Halagian used him as the capital side won the national championship undefeated. In the same season, Munteanu helped Dinamo eliminate Luis Figo's Sporting Lisbon with a 2–1 aggregate victory in the first round of the UEFA Cup, with their campaign ending in the following round as they lost to Genoa against whom he scored once.

In the next season, Munteanu netted a personal record of 15 league goals as The Red Dogs finished in second place. He also helped them get past Kuusysi Lahti in the first round of the 1992–93 Champions League. Dinamo faced Olympique Marseille in the second round, where they drew 0–0 in the first leg but lost the subsequent game with 2–0, the French ultimately winning the competition.

=== Cercle Brugge ===
In 1993, Munteanu along with teammates Tibor Selymes, Marius Cheregi and Ovidiu Hanganu transferred from Dinamo to Cercle Brugge, which paid 2.7 million deutschmarks for Munteanu's transfer. He made his Belgian First Division debut on 7 August under coach Georges Leekens in a 2–0 away loss to Gent. On 17 October, he netted his first goal in a 4–2 defeat in the Bruges derby against Club Brugge. At the end of his first season he was named the Belgian league Man of the Season. On 20 May 1995 he made his last appearance in the Belgian First Division in a 1–1 draw against Eendracht Aalst, totaling 65 matches and netting 12 goals in the competition.

=== 1. FC Köln ===
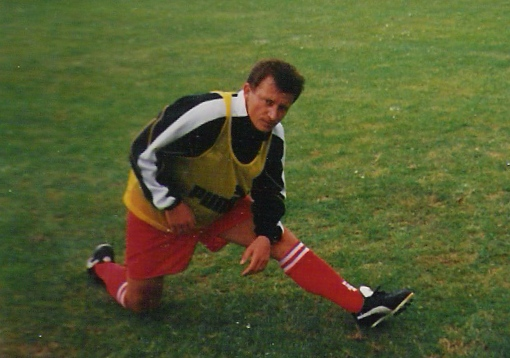
Munteanu with 1. FC Köln

After two years in Belgium, he was transferred for a fee of €1.1 million to German side 1. FC Köln where he was teammates with compatriot Ion Vlădoiu. Munteanu made his Bundesliga debut on 12 August 1995 under coach Morten Olsen in a 1–0 home loss to Schalke 04. He scored his first goal on 15 October in a 2–2 draw against Bayer Leverkusen, and by the end of the season, he also managed a brace in a 3–0 home win over Eintracht Frankfurt. At the end of his third season, Köln was relegated but Munteanu stayed with the club for one more year in 2. Bundesliga.

During his time with The Billy Goats, he also participated in the Intertoto Cup. In 1995, he scored two goals against Tottenham in an 8–0 victory, helping his team reach the round of 16. Then, in the 1997 edition, the team reached the semi-finals, Munteanu scoring two goals in group stage wins against Maccabi Petah Tikva and Cork City.

=== VfL Wolfsburg ===
In 1999 he joined VfL Wolfsburg which paid €850,000 to Köln for him. He made his Bundesliga debut for them on 13 August under coach Wolfgang Wolf in a 2–1 home victory against TSV 1860 Munich. On 20 February he netted his first goal for The Wolves when he opened the score in a 2–0 home win over Arminia Bielefeld. In the 2003 Intertoto Cup he scored twice, in wins against Marek Dupnitsa and Cibalia in the group stage and semi-finals respectively, as the team reached the final where he did not play in the aggregate loss to Perugia.

On 5 October 2003, Munteanu made his last Bundesliga appearance in Wolfsburg's 5–3 away loss to Werder Bremen, totaling 198 matches with 22 goals in the competition.

=== Steaua București ===
In 2003, aged 35, he was released from his contract by VfL Wolfsburg and was convinced by coach Victor Pițurcă to sign with Steaua București where he was shortly injured in a game against Național București. In the 2004–05 season, Munteanu worked with coaches Walter Zenga and Dumitru Dumitriu who used him in 28 matches in which he netted one goal in a 1–0 win over Brașov and the team won the title. In the same season, he played 11 games in the UEFA Cup as Steaua managed to eliminate title holders Valencia in the campaign, reaching the round of 16 where the journey ended in favor of Villarreal.

=== Late career ===
In 2005, Munteanu went as a player-coach at CFR Cluj. He played seven games in the 2005 Intertoto Cup campaign as CFR got past Athletic Bilbao, Saint-Étienne and Žalgiris, reaching the final where they were defeated 4–2 on aggregate by Lens in which he scored once. In October 2006 he left CFR and joined Argeș Pitești where he made three league appearances. For the 2007–08 season, Munteanu worked at Vaslui where on 1 December 2007 he made his last Liga I appearance in a 1–0 away loss to Rapid București, totaling 225 matches with 38 goals in the competition.

He played his last three games as a professional footballer while he was at Universitatea Cluj during the 2008–09 Liga II season. Afterwards, even though he was registered as a player-coach at Steaua București and during his second spell at "U" Cluj, he eventually did not make any appearances. Throughout his career, Munteanu was placed several times among the top five in the Romanian Footballer of the Year ranking, finishing third in both 1992 and 2005.

== International career ==
=== Early years ===
Munteanu played three games for Romania's under-21 side between 1988 and 1990.

He made his debut for Romania's main team on 23 May 1991 at the age of 22, under coach Mircea Rădulescu who used him the full 90 minutes of a friendly which ended with a 1–0 away loss to Norway, played at the Ullevaal stadium in Oslo. He netted his first goal on 21 December 1991 in a 3–1 friendly loss to Egypt.

=== 1994 World Cup ===
Munteanu played 10 matches during the successful 1994 World Cup qualifiers. In the final tournament, coach Anghel Iordănescu used him as a starter in all five games. Romania's "Golden Generation" advanced past the group stage and then eliminated Argentina with a 3–2 victory in the round of 16. They were subsequently defeated after a penalty shoot-out by Sweden in the quarter-finals.

=== Euro 1996 ===
During the Euro 1996 qualifiers, he played eight games and scored two goals in victories against Israel and Slovakia. In the final tournament, Iordănescu used him in all three games which were losses to France, Bulgaria and Spain, as Romania failed to progress from their group. In the game against the Bulgarians, Munteanu's powerful 25-meter shot defeated goalkeeper Borislav Mihaylov, hitting the crossbar and falling approximately 20 centimeters beyond the goal line, but referee Peter Mikkelsen wrongfully disallowed the goal.

=== 1998 World Cup ===
During the 1998 World Cup qualifiers he made eight appearances, scoring a hat-trick in a 8–1 victory against Liechtenstein. Munteanu was used by Iordănescu for the entirety of all four games in the final tournament. In the group stage, Romania earned victories in the first two rounds against Colombia and England, thus mathematically being qualified before the last group match against Tunisia. In order to celebrate, the players dyed their hair blonde and presented themselves like that at the game. They were defeated with 1–0 by Croatia in the round of 16 after a goal scored from a penalty by Davor Šuker.

=== Euro 2000 ===
Munteanu played nine games and scored three goals in the Euro 2000 qualifiers. The first goal was in the 90th minute of a 1–0 win over Portugal as Ionuț Lupescu moved the ball towards him at a free kick and he netted the goal with a powerful 25-meter shot. The next one was in a 2–0 victory against rivals Hungary and the third was from a penalty in a 4–0 win over Azerbaijan.

In the final tournament, coach Emerich Jenei used him for the entirety of all four matches. He scored once in the 3–2 victory against England that helped them qualify to the quarter-finals where they lost 2–0 to Italy.

=== Final years ===
In the 2002 World Cup qualifiers, Munteanu helped the team reach a play-off where they faced Slovenia, losing 3–2 on aggregate.

Afterwards, he scored his last goal for The Tricolours in a 5–2 home loss to Denmark in the Euro 2004 qualifiers. During the second leg against the Danes, while Romania was leading in the final minutes of the game with 2–1, Munteanu executed a corner kick which was recovered by the opponents who eventually equalized, thus qualifying instead of Romania to the final tournament. After the game he was criticized for the way he executed the corner.

In the following years, Munteanu played in the 2006 World Cup qualifiers and Euro 2008 qualifiers. His last appearance for the national team took place on 12 September 2007, when coach Victor Pițurcă sent him in the 62nd minute to replace Paul Codrea in a 3–1 friendly loss to Germany that was played at RheinEnergieStadion in Cologne.

He has a total of 134 matches and 16 goals for Romania, his number of caps being the national record.

For representing his country at four final tournaments, Munteanu was decorated by then President of Romania, Traian Băsescu on 25 March 2008, with the Ordinul "Meritul Sportiv" – (The Medal of "Sportive Merit") Class III.

== Managerial career ==
=== Player-coach period ===
In 2005, Munteanu went as a player-coach at CFR Cluj. He helped them get past Athletic Bilbao, Saint-Étienne and Žalgiris in the 2005 Intertoto Cup, reaching the final where they were defeated 4–2 on aggregate by Lens. The team also finished fifth in the 2005–06 Divizia A season. During the first half of the 2006–07 season, despite a good start with CFR Cluj, Munteanu announced his resignation, due to club management's interference with his decisions and lack of support. Munteanu had a pending offer from Argeș Pitești and he decided to accept it, despite the team being bottom of the first league after 10 games. Towards the end of the season, due to impossibility of avoiding the relegation of Argeș, he was sacked, only to be confirmed shortly thereafter as the new manager of fellow first league team FC Vaslui. He was pressed by the owner to leave Vaslui in March 2008, following a 1–0 loss to Steaua București. Munteanu became head coach of Universitatea Cluj in September 2008, but only after seven games he quit to join Steaua. He led Steaua in five league games in which the team was undefeated. However, he lost all three games in the Champions League group stage to Lyon, Bayern Munich and Fiorentina, being dismissed by the club's president, Gigi Becali. Shortly afterwards he returned to "U" Cluj in the second league, helping it avoid relegation to the third.

=== Oțelul Galați ===
On 1 July 2009, Oțelul Galați club official, Marius Stan confirmed that Munteanu signed with the club. In the first season under his command, the team finished eighth.

In the next season, Oțelul managed to produce one of the biggest surprises in Romanian football by becoming champion for the first time in its history. Munteanu was seen as the primary factor for this success. He started the following season by winning the Supercupa României after a 1–0 victory against Steaua București. Afterwards, under Munteanu's guidance, The Steelworkers took part in the 2011–12 Champions League group stage, but failed to gain a single point as they lost all six games to Basel, Benfica and Manchester United.

In the championship, they finished sixth and did not qualify for the European competitions. The 2012–13 season started badly for Oțelul, earning only five points in the first six rounds, as a consequence, Munteanu resigned.

=== Dinamo București and abroad spells ===
In November 2012, he was installed as head coach of Dinamo București. After only one month and four games in charge at Dinamo, Munteanu resigned at the end of 2012, citing his desire to coach abroad. Just a day later, on 28 December 2012, Munteanu signed a contract for one and a half years with Russian Premier League team, Mordovia Saransk. He brought Romanian forward Daniel Oprița to the team, but the spell was unsuccessful as Mordovia was relegated at the end of the season.

On 1 August 2013, Munteanu took charge of Russian side Kuban Krasnodar where among his players were compatriot Gigel Bucur and French international Djibril Cissé. He helped the team eliminate Motherwell and Feyenoord in the 2013–14 Europa League campaign, reaching the group stage where they lost the first two games against St. Gallen and Valencia. He was sacked on 12 October 2013 while the team was in 10th place, because the club's officials were not satisfied with the results.

On 14 June 2014, Munteanu was appointed as manager of Gabala, bringing fellow Romanians Andrei Cristea, Adrian Ropotan and Alexandru Benga to the club. Munteanu was relieved of his duties on 8 December 2014, following four wins in 16 matches.

=== Astra Giurgiu and Zakho ===
On 4 March 2015, Munteanu was presented as the head coach of Astra Giurgiu, but late in April he left the team due to poor results.

In late December 2016, he signed with Iraqi side, Zakho and his spell was again short, leaving them about two months later.

=== CSMȘ Reșița and Concordia Chiajna ===
In April 2017 he went to work as technical director at third league club CSMȘ Reșița, while Leontin Doană was head coach.

In September 2018, Munteanu returned to first league football, going to Concordia Chiajna, being dismissed in January 2019 as the club's officials were not satisfied with the results.

In November 2019 he made a comeback to Reșița, this time in the second league and as head coach, helping the team avoid relegation at the end of the season.

=== Return to Oțelul Galați ===
In July 2021, Munteanu returned to Oțelul Galați, then in the third league, helping them earn promotion to the second at the end of his first season at the club. In the following season, he managed another promotion, helping the club return to the first league after eight years. His next performance was reaching the 2024 Cupa României final which was lost at the penalty shoot-out to Corvinul Hunedoara.

Munteanu left Oțelul in December 2024, citing the club's financial problems as the reason.

=== Sepsi OSK and Hermannstadt ===
On 18 March 2025, Munteanu was presented as the head coach of Sepsi OSK. However, in late April he was dismissed following four losses and one draw in the five games he was in charge.

In December 2025, Munteanu was employed by Hermannstadt as a replacement for Marius Măldărășanu. After failing to save the team from relegation at the end of the 2025–26 season, he left the club.

== Personal life ==
In 1994, Munteanu was named Honorary Citizen of Bucharest.

Sports commentator Ilie Dobre wrote a book about him titled Dorinel Munteanu - metronomul de la mijlocul terenului (Dorinel Munteanu - the metronome in the midfield), which was released in 2001.

== Career statistics ==
=== Club ===
Appearances and goals by club, season and competition
Club	Season	League			National cup (Note: Includes Cupa României, Belgian Cup, DFB-Pokal)		Europe		Other		Total	
Club	Season	Division	Apps	Goals	Apps	Goals	Apps	Goals	Apps	Goals	Apps	Goals
Minerul Oravița	1982–83	Divizia C	?	?	?	?	–		–		?	?
Minerul Oravița	1983–84	Divizia C	?	?	?	?	–		–		?	?
Minerul Oravița	1984–85	Divizia C	?	?	?	?	–		–		?	?
Minerul Oravița	1985–86	Divizia C	?	?	?	?	–		–		?	?
Minerul Oravița	Total		?	?	?	?	–		–		?	?
Metalul Bocșa	1986–87	Divizia B	13	0	1	0	–		–		14	0
CSM Reșița	1987–88	Divizia B	5	0	0	0	–		–		5	0
Olt Scornicești	1988–89	Divizia A	31	2	1	0	–		–		32	2
Olt Scornicești	1989–90	Divizia A	2	0	–		–		–		2	0
Olt Scornicești	Total		33	2	1	0	–		–		34	2
Inter Sibiu	1989–90	Divizia A	14	0	1	0	–		–		15	0
Inter Sibiu	1990–91	Divizia A	33	7	6	0	4 (Note: Appearances in Balkans Cup)	1	–		43	8
Inter Sibiu	Total		47	7	7	0	4	1	–		58	8
Dinamo București	1991–92	Divizia A	33	12	2	0	4 (Note: Appearances in UEFA Cup)	1	–		39	13
Dinamo București	1992–93	Divizia A	34	15	2	1	4 (Note: Appearances in UEFA Champions League)	0	–		40	16
Dinamo București	Total		67	27	4	1	8	1	–		79	29
Cercle Brugge	1990–91	Belgian First Division	34	7	1	0	–		–		35	7
Cercle Brugge	1994–95	Belgian First Division	31	5	2	1	–		–		33	6
Cercle Brugge	Total		65	12	3	1	–		–		68	13
1. FC Köln	1995–96	Bundesliga	33	4	1	0	4 (Note: Appearances in UEFA Intertoto Cup)	3	–		38	7
1. FC Köln	1996–97	Bundesliga	31	4	1	1	–		–		32	5
1. FC Köln	1997–98	Bundesliga	33	3	0	0	5	2	–		38	5
1. FC Köln	1998–99	2. Bundesliga	32	7	1	0	–		–		33	7
1. FC Köln	Total		129	18	3	1	9	5	–		141	24
VfL Wolfsburg	1999–00	Bundesliga	22	3	1	0	3	0	–		26	3
VfL Wolfsburg	2000–01	Bundesliga	24	3	2	0	2	0	–		28	3
VfL Wolfsburg	2001–02	Bundesliga	33	3	3	1	4	0	–		40	4
VfL Wolfsburg	2002–03	Bundesliga	18	2	1	1	–		–		19	3
VfL Wolfsburg	2003–04	Bundesliga	4	0	1	0	5	2	–		10	2
VfL Wolfsburg	Total		101	11	8	2	14	2	–		123	15
Steaua București	2003–04	Divizia A	5	1	–		–		–		5	1
Steaua București	2004–05	Divizia A	28	1	1	0	11	0	–		40	1
Steaua București	Total		33	2	1	0	11	0	–		45	2
CFR Cluj	2005–06	Divizia A	21	0	1	0	7	1	–		29	1
CFR Cluj	2006–07	Liga I	5	0	–		–		–		5	0
CFR Cluj	Total		26	0	1	0	7	1	–		34	1
Argeș Pitești	2006–07	Liga I	3	0	1	0	–		–		4	0
Vaslui	2007–08	Liga I	16	0	0	0	–		–		16	0
Universitatea Cluj	2008–09	Liga II	3	0	1	0	–		–		4	0
Steaua București	2008–09	Liga I	0	0	–		0	0	–		0	0
Career total			541	79	30	5	53	10	0	0	624	94

=== International ===
Appearances and goals by national team and year
National team	Year	Apps	Goals
Romania	1991	7	2
Romania	1992	8	0
Romania	1993	9	0
Romania	1994	13	0
Romania	1995	6	2
Romania	1996	10	0
Romania	1997	5	3
Romania	1998	14	1
Romania	1999	10	2
Romania	2000	11	1
Romania	2001	11	1
Romania	2002	7	2
Romania	2003	8	2
Romania	2004	0	0
Romania	2005	9	0
Romania	2006	3	0
Romania	2007	3	0
Total		134	16

Scores and results list Romania's goal tally first, score column indicates score after each Munteanu goal.

List of international goals scored by Dorinel Munteanu
No.	Date	Venue	Opponent	Score	Result	Competition
1	21 December 1991	Cairo International Stadium, Cairo, Egypt	Egypt	1–1	1–3	Friendly
2	24 December 1991	Port Said Stadium, Port Said, Egypt	Egypt	1–0	1–1	Friendly
3	7 June 1995	Stadionul Steaua, Bucharest, Romania	Israel	2–1	2–1	UEFA Euro 1996 qualifying
4	15 October 1995	Všešportový areál, Košice, Slovakia	Slovakia	2–0	2–0	UEFA Euro 1996 qualifying
5	6 September 1997	Sportpark, Eschen, Liechtenstein	Liechtenstein	5–0	8–1	1998 FIFA World Cup qualification
6	6 September 1997	Sportpark, Eschen, Liechtenstein	Liechtenstein	6–0	8–1	1998 FIFA World Cup qualification
7	6 September 1997	Sportpark, Eschen, Liechtenstein	Liechtenstein	7–1	8–1	1998 FIFA World Cup qualification
8	10 October 1998	Estádio das Antas, Porto, Portugal	Portugal	1–0	1–0	UEFA Euro 2000 qualifying
9	5 June 1999	Stadionul Steaua, Bucharest, Romania	Hungary	2–0	2–0	UEFA Euro 2000 qualifying
10	9 June 1999	Stadionul Steaua, Bucharest, Romania	Azerbaijan	2–0	4–0	UEFA Euro 2000 qualifying
11	20 June 2000	Stade du Pays de Charleroi, Charleroi, Belgium	England	2–2	3–2	UEFA Euro 2000
12	28 March 2001	Boris Paichadze Dinamo Arena, Tbilisi, Georgia	Georgia	1–0	2–0	2002 FIFA World Cup qualification
13	27 March 2002	Stadionul Gheorghe Hagi, Constanța, Romania	Ukraine	1–0	4–1	Friendly
14	7 September 2002	Koševo City Stadium, Sarajevo, Bosnia and Herzegovina	Bosnia and Herzegovina	2–0	3–0	UEFA Euro 2004 qualifying
15	12 February 2003	GSZ Stadium, Larnaca, Cyprus	Slovakia	1–1	2–1	Friendly
16	29 March 2003	Stadionul Lia Manoliu, Bucharest, Romania	Denmark	2–1	2–5	UEFA Euro 2004 qualifying

== Managerial statistics ==
As of 1 November 2026

Team	From	To	Record							
Team	From	To	G	W	D	L	GF	GA	GD	Win %
(Romania) CFR Cluj	1 July 2005	2 October 2006	49	24	13	12	77	52	+25	48.98
(Romania) Argeș Pitești	5 October 2006	26 April 2007	21	5	7	9	14	20	−6	23.81
(Romania) Vaslui	1 July 2007	5 April 2008	27	10	10	7	37	27	+10	37.04
(Romania) Universitatea Cluj	26 August 2008	26 October 2008	10	5	2	3	14	13	+1	50.00
(Romania) Steaua București	27 October 2008	15 December 2008	8	1	4	3	4	7	−3	12.50
(Romania) Universitatea Cluj	1 April 2009	30 June 2009	12	4	5	3	14	11	+3	33.33
(Romania) Oțelul Galați	8 July 2009	30 August 2012	121	54	25	42	139	118	+21	44.63
(Romania) Dinamo București	15 November 2012	27 December 2012	5	2	3	0	9	6	+3	40.00
(Russia) Mordovia Saransk	28 December 2012	10 June 2013	11	3	2	6	12	16	−4	27.27
(Russia) Kuban Krasnodar	11 June 2013	12 October 2013	19	7	6	6	22	23	−1	36.84
(Azerbaijan) Gabala	14 June 2014	8 December 2014	18	6	5	7	20	26	−6	33.33
(Romania) Astra Giurgiu	4 March 2015	28 April 2015	10	3	3	4	8	7	+1	30.00
(Iraq) Zakho	30 December 2016	23 February 2017	5	0	2	3	1	8	−7	0.00
(Romania) Concordia Chiajna	18 September 2018	7 January 2019	14	2	4	8	10	26	−16	14.29
(Romania) CSM Reșița	10 November 2019	29 May 2020	7	2	2	3	10	9	+1	28.57
(Romania) Oțelul Galați	6 July 2021	30 December 2024	138	64	41	33	200	126	+74	46.38
(Romania) Sepsi OSK	18 March 2025	28 April 2025	5	0	1	4	3	12	−9	0.00
(Romania) Hermannstadt	10 December 2025	4 June 2026	23	7	6	10	29	33	−4	30.43
(Romania) CSM Reșița	9 June 2026	present	14	9	0	5	22	17	+5	64.29
Total			517	208	141	168	645	558	+87	40.23

== Honours ==
=== Player ===
Inter Sibiu

- Balkans Cup: 1990–91

Dinamo București

- Divizia A: 1991–92

VfL Wolfsburg

- Intertoto Cup runner-up: 2003

Steaua București

- Divizia A: 2004–05

CFR Cluj

- Intertoto Cup runner-up: 2005

=== Individual ===
- Romanian Footballer of the Year (third place): 1992, 2005, (fourth place): 1995, 2000, (fifth place): 1991, 1996
- Man of the Season (Belgian First Division): 1993–94

=== Coach ===
CFR Cluj

- Intertoto Cup runner-up: 2005

Oțelul Galați

- Liga I: 2010–11
- Cupa României runner-up: 2023–24
- Supercupa României: 2011
- Liga III: 2021–22

Individual

- Gazeta Sporturilor Romania Coach of the Month: September 2023

== See also ==
- List of men's footballers with 100 or more international caps
