= Cotora =

Cotora is a Romanian surname. Notable people with the surname include:

- Florin Cotora (1972–2026), Romanian footballer
- Lucian Cotora (born 1969), Romanian footballer, brother of Florin

== See also ==
- Cotorra
- Kotora
