= Radu Niculescu =

Romanian footballer (born 1975)

Personal information
- Full name: Horia Radu Niculescu
- Date of birth: 2 March 1975 (age 51)
- Place of birth: Sibiu, Romania
- Height: 1.84 m (6 ft 0 in)
- Position: Striker

Youth career
- –1989: Șoimii IPA Sibiu

Senior career*
Years	Team	Apps	(Gls)
1989–1990	Șoimii IPA Sibiu		
1990–1994	Inter Sibiu	54	(14)
1994	Dinamo București	3	(0)
1994	Inter Sibiu	8	(2)
1995	Universitatea Craiova	9	(1)
1995–2002	Național București	125	(53)
1998	→ Rapid București (loan)	8	(2)
2001	→ Steaua București (loan)	10	(3)
2002	→ Galatasaray (loan)	9	(3)
2002–2003	Ankaragücü	7	(2)
2003	Steaua București	1	(1)
2003	Național București	4	(0)
2004	Changchun Yatai	10	(3)
Total		248	(84)

International career
1993	Romania U18	3	(0)
1993–1994	Romania U21	2	(1)
1994–2000	Romania	15	(2)
- * Club domestic league appearances and goals

Radu Horia Niculescu (born 2 March 1975) is a Romanian former professional footballer who played as a striker.

== International career ==
Niculescu won 15 caps for the Romania national team, scoring twice, between 1994 and 2000. He played at the 1998 FIFA World Cup as a substitute against Colombia and Croatia.

== Career statistics ==
Appearances and goals by national team and year
National team	Year	Apps	Goals
Romania	1994	5	1
Romania	1995	2	0
Romania	1998	6	1
Romania	1999	0	0
Romania	2000	2	0
Total		15	2

Scores and results list Romania's goal tally first, score column indicates score after each Niculescu goal.

List of international goals scored by Radu Niculescu
No.	Date	Venue	Opponent	Score	Result	Competition
1	20 April 1994	Stadionul Steaua, Bucharest, Romania	Bolivia	3–0	3–0	Friendly
2	6 June 1998	Stadionul Ilie Oană, Ploiești, Romania	Moldova	5–0	5–1	Friendly

== Honours ==
Șoimii IPA Sibiu

- Divizia C: 1989–90

Inter Sibiu

- Balkans Cup: 1990–91

Național București

- Cupa României runner-up: 1996–97

Steaua București

- Divizia A: 2000–01

Galatasaray

- Süper Lig: 2001–02
