= Iosif Tâlvan =

Romanian football midfielder

Personal information
- Full name: Iosif Ovidiu Tâlvan
- Date of birth: 29 July 1972 (age 54)
- Place of birth: Sibiu, Romania
- Height: 1.76 m (5 ft 9 in)
- Position: Midfielder

Youth career
- Șoimii Sibiu

Senior career*
Years	Team	Apps	(Gls)
1991–1996	Inter Sibiu	145	(2)
1996–2002	Dinamo București	113	(4)
1999	→ Rocar București (loan)	6	(0)
2000	→ Astra Ploiești (loan)	8	(0)
2003	Henan Jianye	24	(2)
2004	Pegah Gilan		
2004	Dinamo București	0	(0)
2005	FC Sibiu	13	(0)
2005	Apulum Alba Iulia	13	(0)
2006	Universitatea Cluj	20	(0)
2007–2008	Minerul Lupeni	20	(0)
Total		362	(8)

International career^{‡}
1993–1996	Romania B	2	(0)
1995	Romania	2	(0)

Managerial career
- 2012: Voința Sibiu (assistant)
- * Club domestic league appearances and goals as of 14 September 2007 ‡ National team caps and goals as of 14 September 2007

Iosif Ovidiu Tâlvan (born 29 July 1972, in Sibiu) is a retired Romanian football midfielder.

== Club career ==
Tâlvan was born on 29 July 1972 in Sibiu, Romania and grew up as a fan of Universitatea Craiova. He began playing junior-level football at local club Șoimii. Tâlvan started his senior career at neighboring club Inter, making his Divizia A debut on 27 October 1991 under coach Ștefan Coidum in a 2–0 loss to Universitatea Craiova. After the team suffered relegation at the end of the 1995–96 season, Tâlvan moved to Dinamo București. Following two and a half years spent with Dinamo, he was sent on loan to second-tier club Rocar București. He helped Rocar gain promotion to the first league after defeating UTA Arad in a promotion play-off. In the middle of the 1999–2000 season, Tâlvan returned to Dinamo, playing nine league games under coach Cornel Dinu to help the club win The Double. Afterwards, he had another loan spell, this time to first-tier club Astra Ploiești. Midway through the 2000–01 season, he came back to Dinamo and helped them win the Cupa României by playing the entire match under coach Cornel Dinu in the 4–2 win over Rocar in the final. In the following season, Tâlvan made 26 league appearances and scored two goals under coaches Marin Ion and Dinu as the team won another title. Over his years at Dinamo, he played 10 matches in European competitions (including four games in the UEFA Intertoto Cup). Notably, during the 2001–02 UEFA Cup, he helped the team get past Dinamo Tirana in the qualifying round, but they were defeated by Grasshopper in the first round. Tâlvan started the 2002–03 season at Dinamo, but he was transferred in the middle of it to Chinese club Henan Jianye. However, The Red Dogs still managed to win the Cupa României without him. Tâlvan made his last Divizia A appearance on 8 December 2002 in Dinamo's 1–0 win over Universitatea Craiova, totaling 268 matches with six goals in the competition. After one year in China with Henan, Tâlvan moved in 2004 to Iranian club Pegah Gilan for a four-month spell. Subsequently, he made a comeback to Dinamo, but did not get to play in any official match for them. He then went to play in the second league for FC Sibiu before joining Apulum Alba Iulia. In the middle of the 2005–06 season, Tâlvan moved to Universitatea Cluj. After making seven appearances for Universitatea in the first half of the 2006–07 season, he joined Minerul Lupeni, but "U" still managed to achieve promotion without him. Tâlvan ended his career after making five appearances for Minerul during the 2007–08 season.

== International career ==
In 1993 and 1996, Tâlvan played two matches for Romania B.

Tâlvan played two friendly games for Romania, making his debut on 8 February 1995, when coach Anghel Iordănescu sent him on at halftime to replace Florin Bătrânu in a 1–0 loss to Greece. His second match was a 1–1 draw against Turkey.

== Coaching career ==
In 2012, Tâlvan was assistant coach to Dorin Zotincă at Liga II club Voința Sibiu.

== Honours ==
Dinamo București

- Divizia A: 1999–2000, 2001–02
- Cupa României: 1999–2000, 2000–01, 2002–03

Universitatea Cluj

- Liga II: 2006–07
