= Gheorghe Mihali =

Romanian footballer and manager

Personal information
- Date of birth: 9 December 1965 (age 60)
- Place of birth: Baia Borșa, Romania
- Height: 1.80 m (5 ft 11 in)
- Position: Centre-back

Youth career
- 1978–1981: Minerul Borșa
- 1981–1984: Luceafărul București

Senior career*
Years	Team	Apps	(Gls)
1984–1989	Olt Scornicești	141	(0)
1990–1991	Inter Sibiu	43	(3)
1991–1995	Dinamo București	123	(10)
1995–1998	Guingamp	100	(5)
1999–2001	Dinamo București	52	(7)
Total		459	(25)

International career
1983	Romania U18	1	(0)
1986–1987	Romania U21	6	(1)
1991	Romania B	3	(0)
1991–1996	Romania	31	(0)

Managerial career
- 2002: Dinamo București (youth)
- 2002: Romania U21 (assistant)
- 2005–2006: CFR Cluj (assistant)
- 2006–2007: Argeș Pitești (assistant)
- 2007–2008: CSM Focșani
- 2008: Universitatea Cluj (assistant)
- 2008–2009: Universitatea Cluj
- 2009: Dinamo II București (assistant)
- 2009: Dinamo II București
- 2009–2011: Al-Ettifaq (assistant)
- 2011: Dubai CSC (assistant)
- 2012: CSMS Iași (assistant)
- 2012: Dinamo București (assistant)
- 2012–2013: Mordovia Saransk (assistant)
- 2013: Kuban Krasnodar (assistant)
- 2016–2017: Al-Minaa (assistant)
- 2017: UTA Arad (assistant)
- 2017: Mioveni (assistant)
- 2017: Mioveni
- 2019: Balotești
- 2019–2020: AF Muscelul Câmpulung
- 2020: Dinamo București (assistant)
- 2020–2022: Dinamo București U19
- 2022–2023: Dunărea Călărași
- * Club domestic league appearances and goals

Gheorghe "Gică" Mihali (born 9 December 1965) is a Romanian football manager and former player.

== Club career ==
=== Early career ===
Mihali was born on 9 December 1965 in Baia Borșa, Romania and began playing junior-level football in 1978 at local club Minerul. In 1981, he moved to Luceafărul București. He began his senior career at Olt Scornicești, making his Divizia A debut on 30 September 1984 under coach Dumitru Macri in a 1–0 win over Argeș Pitești. In the middle of the 1989–90 season, Mihali signed with Inter Sibiu, with which he won the 1990–91 Balkans Cup under coach Viorel Hizo.

=== Dinamo București ===
In 1991, Mihali and Dorinel Munteanu were transferred from Inter Sibiu to Dinamo București. In Mihali's first season, he played 30 league games under coach Florin Halagian, as the capital side won the national championship undefeated. In the same season, he helped Dinamo eliminate Luis Figo's Sporting Lisbon with a 2–1 aggregate victory in the first round of the UEFA Cup, with their campaign ending in the following round as they lost to Genoa. He also helped them get past Kuusysi Lahti in the first round of the 1992–93 Champions League. Dinamo faced Olympique Marseille in the second round, where they drew 0–0 in the first leg but lost the subsequent game with 2–0, the French ultimately winning the competition.

=== Guingamp ===
In 1995, Mihali went to play for Guingamp. He made his debut in the French Division 1 on 26 July 1995 under coach Francis Smerecki in the 1–1 draw against Paris Saint-Germain. On 20 January 1996, he scored his first goal in the competition in a 3–0 win over Saint-Étienne. He played seven matches in the 1996 Intertoto Cup, helping the team win the competition. Mihali helped Guingamp reach the 1996 Coupe de France final, playing the entire match under Smerecki in the loss to Nice. In the 1996–97 season, he scored a brace in a 3–1 victory against Marseille. The team suffered relegation at the end of the 1997–98 season, but Mihali stayed with the club for another half a year in French Division 2. Mihali played a total of 95 matches with five goals in French Division 1 and five games in French Division 2.

=== Return to Dinamo ===
In the middle of the 1998–99 season, Mihali returned to Dinamo. He helped the team win The Double in the 1999–2000 season, playing 21 league games with three goals under coach Cornel Dinu and the entire match in the 2–0 win over Universitatea Craiova in the Cupa României final. Subsequently, he played the full 90 minutes under Dinu in the 2001 Cupa României final, as Dinamo defeated Rocar București 4–2. Mihali made his last Divizia A appearance on 9 June 2001 in Dinamo's 3–1 victory against Universitatea Craiova in which he scored once, totaling 359 matches with 20 goals in the competition and 23 games in European competitions (including seven appearances in the Intertoto Cup).

== International career ==
From 1983 to 1991, Mihali was consistently featured for Romania's under-18, under-21 and B squads. He helped the B side win the 1991 Nehru Cup, where he played three matches, including the 3–1 win over rivals Hungary in the final.

Mihali played 31 matches for Romania, making his debut on 21 December 1991 under coach Mircea Rădulescu in a 3–1 friendly win against Egypt. He played in six matches during the successful 1994 World Cup qualifiers. Mihali was part of the "Golden Generation", being used by coach Anghel Iordănescu in the first four matches during the final tournament. After getting past the group stage, they defeated Argentina with a 3–2 victory in the round of 16 with Mihali having a highly regarded performance in front of Abel Balbo. They were eliminated after the penalty shoot-out by Sweden in the quarter-finals, without Mihali playing. He played two games during the successful Euro 1996 qualifiers. In the final tournament, the team lost all three group stage games against France, Bulgaria and Spain. Iordănescu used him only in the 1–0 loss to the French side, which was also his final appearance for the national team.

For representing his country at two final tournaments, Mihali was decorated by then President of Romania, Traian Băsescu on 25 March 2008, with the Ordinul "Meritul Sportiv" – (The Medal of "Sportive Merit") Class III.

== Managerial career ==
Mihali turned to coaching a year after his retirement, starting with a youth team of Dinamo București. In 2002, he was part of Ilie Dumitrescu's staff at the helm of Romania's under-21 national team.

From 2005 to 2007, Mihali served as assistant coach to Dorinel Munteanu, first at CFR Cluj and later at Argeș Pitești. His first head coaching role came in 2007, when he was appointed at CSM Focșani. After securing only 13 points from 15 games, Mihali resigned from the Liga II club. In 2008, he reunited with Munteanu, working as his assistant at Universitatea Cluj. That October, Mihali was promoted to head coach of "U" Cluj after Munteanu departed for Steaua București. However, Mihali was dismissed in April 2009 following a dispute with the club's supporters. Later that year, he served as both an assistant and head coach for Dinamo II București. From 2009 to 2011, he assisted Marin Ion in the Middle East, where Ion managed Al-Ettifaq and Dubai CSC. Mihali returned to Romania in 2012 to become the assistant coach at CSMS Iași, during the managerial tenures of Ionuț Popa and Liviu Ciobotariu.

In November 2012, Mihali returned to Dinamo after 11 years to serve once again as Dorinel Munteanu's assistant coach. In the following years, he continued to work under Munteanu at Russian clubs Mordovia Saransk and Kuban Krasnodar. In 2016, he was Marin Ion's assistant at Al-Minaa in Iraq. In 2017, Mihali returned to Romania to serve as Adrian Mihalcea's assistant, first at UTA Arad and later that year at Mioveni; both tenures were in the second league. After Mihalcea left to work as the assistant coach of Cosmin Contra for Romania's national team, Mihali led Mioveni as head coach for a while. In January 2019, he was appointed head coach of second-tier club Balotești, but was sacked in April after earning only three points in seven rounds. Subsequently, in June 2019, he took over Liga IV side AFC Câmpulung Muscel, but left half a year later while the team was in second place.

In 2020, Mihali worked again under Mihalcea as an assistant at Dinamo. Afterwards, he worked for the club's under-19 team. In June 2022, he was named the head coach of Liga III club Dunărea Călărași, but terminated his contract with them in April 2023 due to modest results.

== Career statistics ==
=== International ===
Appearances and goals by national team and year
National team	Year	Apps	Goals
Romania	1991	2	0
Romania	1992	8	0
Romania	1993	3	0
Romania	1994	10	0
Romania	1995	4	0
Romania	1996	4	0
Total		31	0

== Honours ==
=== Player ===
Inter Sibiu

- Balkans Cup: 1990–91

Dinamo București

- Divizia A: 1991–92, 1999–2000
- Cupa României: 1999–2000, 2000–01

Guingamp

- Coupe de France runner-up: 1996–97
- UEFA Intertoto Cup: 1996

Romania B

- Nehru Cup: 1991
