= Nicolae Grigore (footballer, born 1975) =

Romanian footballer

Personal information
- Date of birth: 12 March 1975 (age 51)
- Place of birth: Sibiu, Romania
- Height: 1.80 m (5 ft 11 in)
- Position: Defender

Senior career*
Years	Team	Apps	(Gls)
1996–1997	Carpati Mârșa		
1997–1998	Inter Sibiu	29	(0)
1998–2000	Gaz Metan Mediaș	75	(1)
2001–2003	Alania Vladikavkaz	36	(0)
2003–2004	Unirea Alba Iulia	14	(0)
2004–2007	SKA-Energiya Khabarovsk	105	(7)
2008–2012	Voința Sibiu (Note: The statistics for the 2008–09 Liga IV and 2009–10 Liga III seasons are unavailable.)	54	(3)
Total		313	(11)
- * Club domestic league appearances and goals

Nicolae Grigore (born 12 March 1975 in Sibiu) is a former Romanian football player.

== Honours ==
Gaz Metan Mediaș

- Divizia B: 1999–2000

Voința Sibiu

- Liga III: 2009–10
- Liga IV: 2008–09
