= Adrian Văsâi =

Romanian professional footballer

Personal information
- Date of birth: 9 September 1964 (age 62)
- Place of birth: Bucharest, Romania
- Position: Midfielder

Team information
- Current team: Romania U17 (manager)

Youth career
- 1974–1983: Sportul Studențesc

Senior career*
| Years | Team | Apps | (Gls) |
| 1983–1986 | Sportul Studențesc | 1 | (0) |
| 1986–1995 | Inter Sibiu | 212 | (70) |
| 1992 | → Nyíregyháza Spartacus (loan) | 2 | (0) |
| 1995 | Vanspor | 2 | (0) |
| 1995–1997 | Jiul Petroșani | | |
| Total | | 217 | (70) |

Managerial career
- 1998–2000: Inter Sibiu
- 2002–2003: IS Câmpia Turzii
- 2005: Liberty Salonta
- 2006: FC Sibiu
- 2007–2012: Romania U17
- 2012–2013: Romania U19
- 2015–2017: CNP Timișoara
- 2017–2018: Romania U15
- 2018–2019: Romania U16
- 2019–2020: Romania U17
- 2020–2022: Romania U19
- * Club domestic league appearances and goals as of 2 May 2020

Adrian Văsâi (also known as Adrian Văsîi; born 9 September 1964) is a Romanian former footballer and currently the manager of Romania national under-17 football team.

As a footballer, Văsâi grew up in the academy of Sportul Studențesc, club for which he made his debut in the top-flight in 1983. Subsequently, Văsâi moved to Inter Sibiu where he spent the most important part of his career, playing in 212 matches and scoring 70 goals. He also had a short spells in the Süper Lig at Vanspor and in Nemzeti Bajnokság I at Nyíregyháza Spartacus, before ending his career at Jiul Petroșani.

As a manager, Văsâi started his career at Inter Sibiu, where he was the last manager in the club's history, subsequently being in charge of IS Câmpia Turzii (achieving the round of 16 in the 2002–03 Cupa României) and Liberty Salonta (contributing to a successful promotion campaign to Liga I). Since 2007, Văsâi is an employee of the Romanian Football Federation, time in which he was the manager of U15, U16, U17 and U19 national squads, as well as the coordinator of the Timișoara National Training Center (CNP Timișoara).

== Honours ==
=== Player ===
Inter Sibiu

- Divizia B: Winner (1) 1987–88
- Balkans Cup: Winner (1) 1990–91

Jiul Petroșani

- Divizia B: Winner (1) 1995–96

=== Manager ===
Liberty Salonta

- Divizia B: Winner (1) 2005–06
