= Kotora =

Kotora is a Slovak surname. Notable people with the surname include:

- Igor Kotora (born 1989), Slovak footballer
- James Kotora (born 1983), American U.S. Naval Officer

== See also ==
- Cotora, Romanian surname
