= Dorin Zotincă =

Romanian footballer

Personal information
- Full name: Dorin Bogdan Zotincă
- Date of birth: 13 April 1971 (age 55)
- Place of birth: Brașov, Romania
- Height: 1.87 m (6 ft 2 in)
- Position: Defender

Youth career
- –1989: Șoimii Sibiu

Senior career*
Years	Team	Apps	(Gls)
1989–1995	Inter Sibiu	140	(25)
1995	Dinamo București	10	(0)
1996	Inter Sibiu	9	(1)
1996–1998	Universitatea Cluj	29	(6)
1998	Național București	2	(0)
1999–2000	CSM Reșița	14	(2)
Total		204	(34)

International career
1994	Romania	2	(0)

Managerial career
- 2008–2009: FC Vaslui (assistant)
- 2009: FC Vaslui (caretaker)
- 2010: Universitatea Cluj (assistant)
- 2012: Voința Sibiu
- 2012–2013: FC Vaslui (assistant)
- 2020–2021: Hermannstadt II
- 2023–2026: Hermannstadt (head of youth development)
- 2026: Hermannstadt
- * Club domestic league appearances and goals

Dorin Bogdan Zotincă (born 13 April 1971) is a Romanian former footballer who played as a defender and midfielder. His brother, Alex Zotincă was also a footballer.

== International career ==
Dorin Zotincă played two friendly games at international level for Romania.

== Honours ==
Inter Sibiu

- Balkans Cup: 1990–91
