= 1991–92 Divizia A =

74th season of top-tier football league in Romania

Divizia A
- Season: 1991–92
- Champions: Dinamo București
- Relegated: Argeş Piteşti; Târgu Mureş; Corvinul Hunedoara
- Champions League: Dinamo București
- Cup Winners' Cup: Steaua București
- UEFA Cup: Electroputere Craiova; Universitatea Craiova; Politehnica Timişoara
- Matches: 306
- Goals: 763 (2.49 per match)
- Top goalscorer: Gábor Gerstenmájer (21)
- Biggest home win: Dinamo 6–0 Petrolul; Electroputere Craiova 6–0 Petrolul
- Biggest away win: Farul 0–5 Steaua
- Highest scoring: Universitatea 5–4 Steaua
- Longest winning run: Dinamo (9)
- Longest unbeaten run: Dinamo (34)
- Longest losing run: Corvinul (5)

The 1991–92 Divizia A was the seventy-fourth season of Divizia A, the top-level football league of Romania.

== Teams ==
Location of teams in 1991-92 Divizia A

== League table ==
An additional place for UEFA Cup was added following the UN ban to Yugoslavia.

Pos	Team	Pld	W	D	L	GF	GA	GD	Pts	Qualification or relegation
1	Dinamo București (C)	34	21	13	0	76	23	+53	55	Qualification to Champions League first round
2	Steaua București	34	20	8	6	68	31	+37	48	Qualification to Cup Winners' Cup first round
3	Electroputere Craiova	34	16	7	11	43	28	+15	39	Qualification to UEFA Cup first round
4	FC U Craiova	34	14	11	9	38	28	+10	39	Qualification to UEFA Cup first round
5	Politehnica Timișoara	34	15	9	10	36	34	+2	39	Qualification to UEFA Cup first round
6	Dacia Unirea Brăila	34	14	7	13	39	37	+2	35	Invitation to Balkans Cup
7	Rapid București	34	13	9	12	34	37	−3	35	Invitation to Intertoto Cup
8	Oțelul Galați	34	15	5	14	38	46	−8	35	
9	Brașov	34	13	8	13	53	49	+4	34	
10	Petrolul Ploiești	34	14	6	14	37	49	−12	34	
11	Gloria Bistrița	34	13	7	14	46	40	+6	33	
12	Inter Sibiu	34	13	7	14	42	43	−1	33	
13	Farul Constanța	34	14	4	16	40	43	−3	32	
14	Bacău	34	11	7	16	32	54	−22	29	
15	Sportul Studenţesc București	34	10	8	16	37	47	−10	28	
16	Argeș Pitești (R)	34	8	8	18	38	52	−14	24	Invitation to Intertoto Cup; Relegation to Divizia B
17	ASA Târgu Mureș (R)	34	8	5	21	31	55	−24	21	Relegation to Divizia B
18	Corvinul Hunedoara (R)	34	6	7	21	35	67	−32	19	Relegation to Divizia B

Source: LT
Rules for classification: 1) points; 2) goal difference; 3) number of goals scored
(C) Champions; (R) Relegated

=== Positions by round ===
Team ╲ Round	1	2	3	4	5	6	7	8	9	10	11	12	13	14	15	16	17	18	19	20	21	22	23	24	25	26	27	28	29	30	31	32	33	34
ASA Târgu Mureș	13	16	13	16	17	13	9	12	14	11	13	14	16	14	15	16	17	17	17	18	17	17	17	17	17	17	17	17	17	17	17	17	17	17
Argeș Pitești	14	17	16	13	11	10	13	14	17	14	14	11	12	11	12	13	14	15	15	16	16	16	16	16	16	16	16	15	16	16	16	16	16	16
Bacău	3	4	3	8	8	9	8	10	8	9	8	9	6	9	11	8	12	13	13	14	14	14	15	13	13	14	14	14	14	14	14	14	15	14
Brașov	4	9	11	10	9	12	14	11	12	10	11	13	13	13	13	14	13	11	11	11	13	12	12	12	12	12	10	8	9	7	8	10	12	9
Corvinul Hunedoara	2	7	4	9	12	14	16	17	15	16	16	18	15	17	17	18	16	18	18	17	18	18	18	18	18	18	18	18	18	18	18	18	18	18
Universitatea Craiova	11	6	10	7	7	8	7	7	5	4	4	5	4	5	4	4	4	4	4	4	4	3	4	3	4	3	3	3	3	5	4	3	3	4
Dacia Unirea Brăila	10	15	14	15	13	15	17	18	18	17	18	15	18	16	18	15	15	14	14	13	12	13	13	14	14	13	13	13	13	11	9	7	8	6
Dinamo București	1	3	1	1	1	1	1	1	1	1	1	1	1	1	1	1	1	1	1	1	1	1	1	1	1	1	1	1	1	1	1	1	1	1
Electroputere Craiova	8	5	2	6	5	5	4	6	6	7	5	8	9	8	8	6	5	5	5	5	5	6	5	7	6	6	6	7	6	4	6	5	5	3
Farul Constanța	17	18	18	17	16	18	18	15	11	12	10	12	10	12	9	11	9	9	10	8	10	8	11	9	11	9	11	10	11	13	13	13	13	13
Petrolul Ploiești	18	13	9	5	2	2	2	2	2	2	2	2	2	3	3	3	3	3	3	3	3	4	3	4	3	4	4	5	5	6	5	6	6	10
Gloria Bistrița	12	8	12	14	15	11	10	8	9	8	9	6	7	6	6	9	7	6	7	7	9	11	10	8	5	7	9	11	12	10	7	11	11	11
Inter Sibiu	9	10	15	11	14	16	15	16	13	15	15	16	14	15	14	12	10	10	8	9	8	5	7	10	8	10	12	12	10	12	10	12	7	12
Oțelul Galați	7	12	8	12	10	6	5	4	3	5	6	4	5	4	5	5	6	8	9	10	7	9	8	11	10	11	8	6	8	9	12	9	10	8
Rapid București	15	11	7	4	6	7	11	9	10	13	12	10	11	7	10	7	11	12	12	12	11	10	9	6	9	8	7	9	7	8	11	8	9	7
Sportul Studențesc București	16	14	17	18	18	17	12	13	16	18	17	17	17	18	16	17	18	16	16	15	15	15	14	15	15	15	15	16	15	15	15	15	14	15
Steaua București	6	2	6	3	3	3	3	3	4	3	3	3	3	2	2	2	2	2	2	2	2	2	2	2	2	2	2	2	2	2	2	2	2	2
Politehnica Timișoara	5	1	5	2	4	4	6	5	7	6	7	7	8	10	7	10	8	7	6	6	6	7	6	5	7	5	5	4	4	3	3	4	4	5

Source: RS (in Romanian)

=== Results ===
Home \ Away	ASA	ARG	BAC	BRA	COR	UCR	DUB	DIN	EXT	FAR	GBI	INT	OȚE	PET	RAP	SPO	STE	POL
ASA Târgu Mureș	—	4–0	0–0	2–2	2–0	0–0	3–1	0–1	1–0	3–0	0–3	1–3	2–2	4–0	0–1	1–2	1–0	1–2
Argeș Pitești	5–0	—	2–4	0–1	1–0	0–2	1–2	0–1	1–1	2–0	1–1	1–0	4–0	2–1	0–1	3–1	1–1	3–1
Bacău	1–0	1–0	—	2–2	2–0	0–0	0–1	1–1	2–0	1–0	0–2	0–0	1–0	2–0	3–1	2–1	1–2	2–0
Brașov	3–0	2–1	3–0	—	4–1	1–1	2–1	0–0	3–1	2–0	2–1	2–0	0–2	2–0	1–1	1–1	3–2	0–0
Corvinul Hunedoara	4–2	4–1	3–0	2–5	—	0–3	1–1	1–1	0–0	0–1	3–2	1–2	3–1	1–1	0–0	4–1	2–2	1–3
Universitatea Craiova	1–0	2–0	4–1	1–0	3–0	—	0–2	1–3	1–0	1–1	2–0	2–0	0–0	0–0	3–1	1–0	5–4	1–1
Dacia Unirea Brăila	0–0	1–1	2–1	3–2	1–0	0–0	—	1–1	2–1	3–0	1–2	2–0	1–2	1–0	1–0	1–0	0–0	4–0
Dinamo București	2–0	3–1	3–0	5–2	5–1	2–0	2–1	—	1–0	4–0	2–1	5–0	4–1	6–0	4–4	1–0	1–0	4–1
Electroputere Craiova	3–1	2–0	4–0	2–0	1–0	1–1	1–0	0–0	—	3–0	2–1	1–1	1–0	6–0	1–0	2–1	1–1	2–0
Farul Constanța	2–0	1–0	3–0	3–1	5–0	1–0	4–1	0–0	0–1	—	3–1	1–0	3–0	1–2	2–0	2–1	0–5	1–1
Gloria Bistrița	2–0	2–0	2–0	2–1	3–1	3–0	4–2	1–1	2–0	0–2	—	2–1	1–0	1–1	1–2	0–0	1–2	0–1
Inter Sibiu	4–0	2–1	1–1	2–1	4–1	0–0	1–0	2–2	2–1	3–1	1–1	—	2–1	2–0	3–1	2–3	1–1	1–0
Oțelul Galați	3–2	1–1	3–0	1–0	2–0	1–0	1–1	2–2	1–0	1–0	1–0	1–0	—	2–1	3–2	2–1	2–0	0–1
Petrolul Ploiești	2–0	1–1	3–1	4–1	2–1	2–0	3–1	0–4	1–2	1–0	1–0	3–1	1–0	—	0–0	0–0	2–1	2–1
Rapid București	0–1	0–0	1–1	2–1	0–0	2–0	1–0	0–3	2–0	2–1	1–0	1–0	2–0	2–0	—	1–1	1–2	2–1
Sportul Studențesc București	1–0	2–2	2–1	2–1	3–0	1–3	0–1	1–1	0–3	1–0	1–1	1–0	5–2	0–3	0–0	—	2–4	2–0
Steaua București	4–0	5–1	4–1	2–2	2–0	1–0	2–0	1–1	3–0	2–1	3–1	2–0	2–0	1–0	3–0	1–0	—	0–0
Politehnica Timișoara	1–0	2–1	4–0	2–0	1–0	0–0	1–0	0–0	0–0	1–1	2–2	2–1	3–0	2–0	1–0	1–0	0–3	—

Source: RS (in Romanian)
Legend: Blue = home team win; Yellow = draw; Red = away team win.

== Top goalscorers ==
Position	Player	Club	Goals
1	(Romania) Gábor Gerstenmájer	Dinamo București	21
2	(Albania) Sulejman Demollari	Dinamo București	18
3	(Romania) Costel Lazăr	Petrolul Ploieşti	16
4	(Romania) Ioan Marcu	Brașov	15
5	(Romania) Adrian Văsâi	Inter Sibiu	14

== Champion squad ==
Dinamo București

Goalkeepers: Bogdan Stelea (11 / 0); Costel Câmpeanu (1 / 0); Florin Tene (21 / 0); Perlat Musta (Albania) (2 / 0).
Defenders: Iulian Mihăescu (27 / 1); Marian Pană (24 / 0); Gheorghe Mihali (30 / 0); Tibor Selymes (27 / 0); Adrian Matei (16 / 0); Tudorel Cristea (13 / 1); Anton Doboș (4 / 0); Marius Răduță (7 / 0).
Midfielders: Marius Cheregi (28 / 4); Gábor Gerstenmájer (30 / 21); Zoltán Kádár (29 / 1); Costel Pană (29 / 7); Dorinel Munteanu (33 / 12); Sebastian Moga (32 / 4); Cristinel Atomulesei (8 / 0); Marius Priseceanu (4 / 0); George Visalom (1 / 0).
Forwards: Sulejman Demollari (Albania) (30 / 18); Daniel Scînteie (7 / 3); Gheorghe Pena (1 / 0); Nelson Mensah (Ghana) (12 / 2); Cristian Sava (14 / 1).
(league appearances and goals listed in brackets)

Manager: Florin Halagian.

== Attendances ==
#	Club	Average
1	Dacia Unirea	10,882
2	Oțelul	10,706
3	Dinamo 1948	8,841
4	Steaua	8,176
5	Timișoara	7,559
6	Petrolul	7,382
7	Farul	7,235
8	FC Rapid	7,088
9	Argeș	6,853
10	Craiova	6,088
11	Gloria	5,147
12	Sibiu	4,676
13	Electroputere	4,324
14	Bacău	4,312
15	Brașov	3,976
16	Târgu Mureș	3,974
17	Sportul Studențesc	2,679
18	Hunedoara	2,429

== See also ==
- 1991–92 Divizia B
