= Cotorra =

Coordinates: 9.05°N 75.8°W

- Municipality and town
- Flag

- Location of the municipality and town of Cotorra in the Córdoba Department of Colombia.
- Country: Colombia
- Department: Córdoba Department

Area
  - Total: 89 km^{2} (34 sq mi)

Population (Census 2018)
  - Total: 16,215
  - Density: 180/km^{2} (470/sq mi)
- Time zone: UTC-5 (Colombia Standard Time)

Cotorra is a town and municipality located in the Córdoba Department, northern Colombia. According to 2018 estimates, the population of Cotorra was 16,215, with a population density of 180 persons per square kilometer.

== See also ==
- Cotora
