= Bogdan Bănuță =

Romanian footballer

Personal information
- Date of birth: 19 August 1965
- Place of birth: Pitești, Romania
- Date of death: 19 April 1992 (aged 26)
- Place of death: Șeica Mare, Romania
- Position: Midfielder

Youth career
- Argeș Pitești

Senior career*
Years	Team	Apps	(Gls)
1982–1990	Argeș Pitești	165	(23)
1982–1983	→ Dacia Pitești (loan)		
1991–1992	Inter Sibiu	16	(1)
Total		181	(24)

International career
1983	Romania U18	2	(0)
1986–1987	Romania U21	5	(1)
- * Club domestic league appearances and goals

Bogdan Bănuță (19 August 1965 – 19 April 1992) was a Romanian footballer who played as a midfielder. On 19 April 1992, when Inter Sibiu's team was traveling to Bistrița for a match with Gloria, their bus overturned after hitting a bridgehead in Șeica Mare and Bănuță and his teammate Radu Gabriel Năstase were the players who lost their lives in the accident.
