= 1990–91 Divizia A =

73rd season of top-tier football league in Romania

Divizia A
- Season: 1990–91
- Champions: Universitatea Craiova
- Relegated: Jiul Petroşani; Bihor Oradea; Universitatea Cluj
- European Cup: Universitatea Craiova
- UEFA Cup: Steaua București; Dinamo București
- Cup Winners' Cup: Bacău
- Matches: 306
- Goals: 844 (2.76 per match)
- Top goalscorer: Ovidiu Hanganu (24)
- Biggest home win: Universitatea Craiova 8–1 Corvinul; Corvinul 7–0 Sportul
- Biggest away win: Rapid 1–4 Universitatea Craiova; Bihor 0–3 Corvinul; Cluj 0–3 Gloria; Cluj 0–3 Farul; Cluj 0–3 Dinamo
- Highest scoring: Universitatea Craiova 8–1 Corvinul; Dinamo 7–2 Cluj
- Longest winning run: Inter, Steaua (5)
- Longest unbeaten run: Steaua (11)
- Longest losing run: Cluj (6)

The 1990–91 Divizia A was the seventy-third season of Divizia A, the top-level football league of Romania.

== Teams ==
Location of teams in 1990-91 Divizia A

== League table ==
Pos	Team	Pld	W	D	L	GF	GA	GD	Pts	Qualification or relegation
1	Universitatea Craiova (C)	34	22	6	6	74	26	+48	50	Qualification to European Cup first round
2	Steaua București	34	20	10	4	67	28	+39	50	Qualification to UEFA Cup first round
3	Dinamo București	34	16	11	7	54	27	+27	43	Qualification to UEFA Cup first round
4	Inter Sibiu	34	18	2	14	56	46	+10	38	
5	Gloria Bistrița	34	15	7	12	51	38	+13	37	
6	Politehnica Timișoara	34	14	7	13	45	45	0	35	
7	Petrolul Ploiești	34	15	5	14	48	49	−1	35	
8	Argeș Pitești	34	13	8	13	49	42	+7	34	
9	Brașov	34	14	6	14	47	45	+2	34	
10	Farul Constanța	34	12	10	12	40	40	0	34	
11	Rapid București	34	13	6	15	44	45	−1	32	Invitation to Intertoto Cup
12	Sportul Studenţesc București	34	10	12	12	45	53	−8	32	Invitation to Intertoto Cup
13	Dacia Unirea Brăila	34	13	5	16	33	49	−16	31	
14	Corvinul Hunedoara (Note: Corvinul were deducted two points.)	34	15	2	17	47	62	−15	30	
15	Bacău	34	11	7	16	32	42	−10	29	Qualification to Cup Winners' Cup first round
16	Jiul Petroșani (R)	34	11	6	17	46	65	−19	28	Relegation to Divizia B
17	Bihor Oradea (R)	34	7	8	19	40	75	−35	22	Relegation to Divizia B
18	Universitatea Cluj (R)	34	5	6	23	26	67	−41	16	Relegation to Divizia B

Source: LT
Rules for classification: 1) points; 2) goal difference; 3) number of goals scored
(C) Champions; (R) Relegated

=== Positions by round ===
Team ╲ Round	1	2	3	4	5	6	7	8	9	10	11	12	13	14	15	16	17	18	19	20	21	22	23	24	25	26	27	28	29	30	31	32	33	34
Argeș Pitești	9	4	10	8	12	10	11	8	7	9	8	10	8	11	9	11	9	8	7	6	8	9	8	6	5	6	6	10	6	9	8	10	8	8
Bacău	15	15	11	13	11	12	10	12	10	11	10	11	14	14	13	13	13	12	13	14	14	15	14	15	15	15	15	15	15	15	15	15	15	15
Bihor Oradea	17	17	17	18	18	18	18	18	18	18	18	18	17	18	18	17	17	17	17	17	17	17	18	17	17	17	17	17	17	17	17	17	17	17
Brașov	2	8	3	9	10	7	5	6	9	8	7	7	9	7	10	8	11	13	11	12	12	13	12	12	12	8	11	7	9	10	12	9	10	9
Corvinul Hunedoara	1	1	6	4	8	6	9	5	8	7	9	6	7	8	7	9	7	7	8	8	9	7	10	9	9	7	8	6	8	12	9	12	12	14
Universitatea Craiova	8	14	12	7	6	3	2	4	3	2	3	2	1	1	2	1	1	2	1	1	1	1	1	1	1	1	1	1	1	1	1	1	1	1
Dacia Unirea Brăila	13	18	18	17	17	17	17	16	17	16	16	16	16	15	16	15	15	15	15	15	15	14	15	14	14	14	14	14	14	14	14	14	14	13
Dinamo București	3	6	5	3	2	5	3	2	1	3	4	4	3	3	3	3	2	3	3	3	3	3	2	3	3	3	3	3	3	3	3	3	3	3
Farul Constanța	5	9	4	10	5	8	8	7	5	6	6	8	6	5	6	6	5	5	5	7	5	6	5	7	7	10	7	11	11	7	10	7	9	10
Gloria Bistrița	10	13	9	12	13	15	14	14	12	13	11	9	12	10	12	10	10	11	10	11	11	11	11	11	11	13	10	8	7	6	7	5	5	5
Inter Sibiu	18	11	7	5	3	2	4	3	4	4	1	3	4	6	5	5	6	6	6	5	7	5	7	5	6	5	4	4	4	4	4	4	4	4
Jiul Petroşani	11	7	13	15	15	14	13	15	14	14	13	15	15	16	15	16	16	16	16	16	16	16	16	16	16	16	16	16	16	16	16	16	16	16
Petrolul Ploiești	16	10	15	14	14	13	15	13	13	10	12	13	10	13	11	12	12	9	12	10	10	10	9	8	8	9	12	13	13	8	6	8	7	7
Rapid București	4	5	2	6	9	11	12	11	15	15	14	14	11	9	8	7	8	10	9	9	6	8	6	10	10	12	9	12	10	13	11	13	13	11
Sportul Studențesc București	6	2	8	2	4	4	7	10	11	12	15	12	13	12	14	14	14	14	14	13	13	12	13	13	13	11	13	9	12	11	13	11	11	12
Steaua București	7	3	1	1	1	1	1	1	2	1	2	1	2	2	1	2	3	1	2	2	2	2	3	2	2	2	2	2	2	2	2	2	2	2
Politehnica Timișoara	14	12	14	11	7	9	6	9	6	5	5	5	5	4	4	4	4	4	4	4	4	4	4	4	4	4	5	5	5	5	5	6	6	6
Universitatea Cluj	12	16	16	16	16	16	16	17	16	17	17	17	18	17	17	18	18	18	18	18	18	18	17	18	18	18	18	18	18	18	18	18	18	18

Source: LT (in Romanian)

=== Results ===
Home \ Away	ARG	BAC	BHO	BRA	COR	UCR	DUB	DIN	FAR	GBI	INT	JIU	PET	RAP	SPO	STE	POL	UCL
Argeș Pitești	—	1–0	4–1	3–0	2–1	2–0	4–0	1–1	3–1	2–0	0–1	5–1	1–1	2–1	3–1	1–1	2–0	3–0
Bacău	1–1	—	0–1	1–0	2–0	1–0	2–1	0–0	0–0	1–0	3–1	2–0	2–0	2–1	3–1	0–0	0–0	2–1
Bihor Oradea	2–1	4–1	—	1–1	0–3	0–2	0–0	2–2	0–0	1–1	3–1	1–3	2–2	3–2	2–2	1–3	0–1	3–1
Brașov	1–0	2–0	2–1	—	2–0	1–1	3–0	1–1	4–0	2–1	3–0	4–1	1–0	1–1	3–0	1–1	4–1	2–1
Corvinul Hunedoara	5–1	3–1	3–2	1–0	—	0–2	2–1	2–1	1–0	1–0	2–1	3–2	0–1	2–0	7–0	0–0	1–0	1–0
Universitatea Craiova	4–0	3–1	4–0	3–0	8–1	—	2–0	1–0	2–2	5–2	5–1	1–1	3–0	3–1	3–1	1–1	3–0	4–0
Dacia Unirea Brăila	2–1	1–0	3–2	1–3	3–0	0–1	—	2–1	2–1	1–0	2–0	4–1	1–0	1–0	0–1	1–1	0–1	3–1
Dinamo București	2–0	2–1	5–0	4–0	2–0	1–1	0–0	—	4–0	2–1	2–1	2–0	3–1	1–0	0–0	1–0	0–0	7–2
Farul Constanța	3–1	0–0	3–1	0–0	3–0	1–2	3–1	0–0	—	1–1	2–0	0–0	3–0	2–1	2–1	0–0	1–0	1–0
Gloria Bistrița	0–0	2–1	3–1	3–2	4–1	1–0	1–0	1–1	2–0	—	1–0	5–0	2–1	5–0	0–0	1–2	3–2	2–1
Inter Sibiu	3–1	2–0	2–3	2–0	5–2	3–0	4–0	2–0	2–1	2–1	—	3–2	4–2	1–0	0–0	1–2	3–0	2–0
Jiul Petroşani	2–2	2–1	1–0	4–0	2–0	0–1	3–1	1–2	1–0	1–3	2–1	—	3–1	1–2	3–1	1–1	1–1	3–0
Petrolul Ploiești	1–1	2–0	2–0	2–1	4–1	1–0	1–1	2–0	1–0	1–0	1–2	3–2	—	1–0	4–1	2–1	6–2	1–1
Rapid București	1–0	3–1	4–0	2–1	2–0	1–4	1–0	0–0	2–0	1–0	0–1	6–1	2–1	—	2–2	0–2	2–1	3–0
Sportul Studențesc București	1–0	3–1	2–0	1–0	1–1	2–2	0–0	1–3	2–2	4–1	1–1	3–0	3–0	4–1	—	1–2	0–2	3–1
Steaua București	2–1	2–0	4–0	4–1	6–2	1–0	6–0	1–0	4–1	0–0	3–1	5–1	2–1	0–0	3–1	—	2–1	3–1
Politehnica Timișoara	2–0	1–0	2–2	2–0	2–1	0–2	3–0	3–1	2–4	1–1	2–1	1–0	3–0	2–2	0–0	3–2	—	4–0
Universitatea Cluj	0–0	2–2	5–1	2–1	2–0	0–1	0–1	0–3	0–3	0–3	0–2	0–0	1–2	0–0	1–1	2–0	1–0	—

Source: LT (in Romanian)
Legend: Blue = home team win; Yellow = draw; Red = away team win.

== Top goalscorers ==
Position	Player	Club	Goals
1	Ovidiu Hanganu	Corvinul Hunedoara	24
2	Marian Bâcu	Jiul Petroşani	17
3	Marian Damaschin	Dinamo București	15
3	Gábor Gerstenmájer	Braşov	15
5	Ion Vlădoiu	Argeș Pitești / Steaua București	14

== Champion squad ==
Universitatea Craiova

Goalkeepers: Florin Prunea (32 / 0); Ștefan Crișan (1 / 0); Gabriel Boldici (2 / 0).
Defenders: Vasile Mănăilă (30 / 2); Emil Săndoi (33 / 13); Adrian Popescu (29 / 1); Nicolae Zamfir (27 / 3); Victor Cojocaru (16 / 0); Costel Carabaș (1 / 0).
Midfielders: Ion Olaru (31 / 2); Dănuț Bică (26 / 0); Gheorghe Ciurea (31 / 13); Pavel Badea (31 / 10); Viorel Prună (9 / 1); Silvian Cristescu (10 / 3); Gheorghe Ceaușilă (6 / 0); Daniel Mogoșanu (27 / 2); Dumitru Mitriță (2 / 0); Cătălin Gârleşteanu (4 / 0).
Forwards: Eugen Neagoe (20 / 5); Adrian Pigulea (31 / 12); Ștefan Stoica (9 / 0); Gheorghe Craioveanu (13 / 3); Claudiu Constantin Stoica (4 / 0); Ovidiu Stîngă (1 / 0); Ion Dudan (4 / 0); Roland Agalliu (Albania) (5 / 3).
(league appearances and goals listed in brackets)

Manager: Sorin Cârțu.

== Attendances ==
#	Club	Average
1	Dacia Unirea	16,294
2	Craiova	13,471
3	FC Rapid	12,882
4	Steaua	11,412
5	Farul	10,559
6	Timișoara	10,235
7	Sibiu	7,265
8	Gloria	7,059
9	Petrolul	6,529
10	Argeș	6,382
11	Dinamo 1948	6,059
12	Bacău	4,882
13	Hunedoara	4,676
14	Jiul	4,588
15	U Cluj	3,871
16	Brașov	3,676
17	Bihor	3,618
18	Sportul Studențesc	2,865

== See also ==
- 1990–91 Divizia B
