= Ion Olaru =

Romanian footballer

Personal information
- Date of birth: 24 August 1961 (age 65)
- Place of birth: Romania
- Position: Midfielder

Senior career*
Years	Team	Apps	(Gls)
1988–1992	FC Universitatea Craiova		
1992–1993	Lausanne-Sport	35	(1)
1993	FC Universitatea Craiova		
1994–1995	SR Delémont		
- * Club domestic league appearances and goals

Ion Olaru (born 24 August 1961) is a retired Romanian football midfielder.
