= Florin Cotora =

Romanian footballer (1972–2026)

Personal information
- Date of birth: 12 December 1972
- Place of birth: Sibiu, Romania
- Date of death: 19 October 2026 (aged 53)
- Height: 1.84 m (6 ft 0 in)
- Position: Goalkeeper

Senior career*
Years	Team	Apps	(Gls)
1991–2001	Inter Sibiu	134	(0)
2001–2002	Minaur Zlatna	21	(0)
2002–2005	Apulum Alba Iulia	44	(0)
Total		199	(0)
- * Club domestic league appearances and goals

Florin Cotora (12 December 1972 – 19 October 2026) was a Romanian footballer who played as a goalkeeper. His brother, Lucian, was also a footballer; they played together at Inter Sibiu. After he ended his playing career, he worked as a DJ.

Cotora died on 19 October 2026, at the age of 53.

== Honours ==
Apulum Alba Iulia

- Divizia B: 2002–03
