= 1992–93 Cupa României =

Tournament details
- Country: Romania

Final positions
- Champions: FC U Craiova
- Runners-up: Dacia Unirea Brăila

The 1992–93 Cupa României was the 55th edition of Romania's most prestigious football cup competition.

The title was won by FC U Craiova against Dacia Unirea Brăila.

== Format ==
The competition is an annual knockout tournament.

First round proper matches are played on the ground of the lowest ranked team, then from the second round proper the matches are played on a neutral location.

If a match is drawn after 90 minutes, the game goes into extra time. If the match is still tied, the result is decided by penalty kicks.

In the quarter-finals and semi-finals, each tie is played as a two legs.

From the first edition, the teams from Divizia A entered in competition in sixteen finals, rule which remained till today.

== First round proper ==
Team 1	Score	Team 2
28 February 1993
Aris Arad (Div. C)	1–6	(Div. A) Gloria Bistrița
Selena Bacău (Div. A)	2–0	(Div. A) Sportul Studenţesc București
Maramureş Baia Mare (Div. B)	5–1	(Div. A) Politehnica Timișoara
ICIM Braşov (Div. B)	1–0	(Div. A) Oțelul Galați
CSM Bucecea (Div. D)	1–5	(Div. A) Inter Sibiu
Danubiana București (Div. C)	1–8	(Div. A) Dinamo București
Gloria Buzău (Div. B)	0–2	(Div. A) Steaua București
Cimentul Fieni (Div. C)	0–2	(Div. A) Universitatea Cluj
ASA Câmpulung Moldovenesc (Div. C)	1–2	(Div. A) Progresul București
Venus Lugoj (Div. C)	0–6	(Div. A) FC U Craiova
Steaua Mizil (Div. B)	0–1	(Div. A) Dacia Unirea Brăila
Minerul Motru (Div. D)	2–1 (a.e.t.)	(Div. A) Electroputere Craiova
Unirea Tricolor Olteniţa (Div. C)	0–0 (a.e.t.) (7–8 p)	(Div. A) Petrolul Ploiești
MECONERG Oneşti (Div. C)	0–3	(Div. A) Rapid București
CSM Reșița (Div. A)	1–0	(Div. A) Farul Constanța
Severnav Turnu Severin (Div. D)	0–1	(Div. A) FC Brașov

== Second round proper ==
Team 1	Score	Team 2
17 March 1993
ICIM Braşov	2–4 (a.e.t.)	Maramureş Baia Mare
Gloria Bistrița	1–0	Rapid București
Dacia Unirea Brăila	1–0	Minerul Motru
FC Brașov	1–1 (a.e.t.) (4–2 p)	Selena Bacău
Universitatea Cluj	3–2	Dinamo București
Inter Sibiu	1–0	Petrolul Ploiești
FC U Craiova	1–0 (a.e.t.)	CSM Reșița
31 March 1993
Steaua București	1–0	Progresul București

== Quarter-finals ==
The matches were played on 21 April and 28 April 1993.

Team 1	Agg.	Team 2	1st leg	2nd leg
Maramureş Baia Mare	3–2	Inter Sibiu	2–2	1–0
Gloria Bistrița	2–1	Steaua București	1–0	1–1
Dacia Unirea Brăila	2–1	FC Brașov	1–0	1–1
FC U Craiova	4–3	Universitatea Cluj	2–0	2–3

== Semi-finals ==
The matches were played on 12 May and 19 May 1993.

Team 1	Agg.	Team 2	1st leg	2nd leg
Dacia Unirea Brăila	4–3	Maramureş Baia Mare	3–2	1–1
FC U Craiova	2–1	Gloria Bistrița	1–0	1–1 (a.e.t.)

== Final ==
26 June 1993
17:00 EET

FC U Craiova	2–0	Dacia Unirea Brăila
Vasc 81'; Craioveanu 88'	Report

Stadionul Naţional, Bucharest
Attendance: 10,000
Referee: Mircea Salomir (Romania)

Cupa României 1992–93 winners

1st title
