= Nelson Mensah =

Ghanaian footballer

Personal information
- Full name: Nelson Samuel Mensah
- Date of birth: 7 December 1973 (age 52)
- Place of birth: Accra, Ghana
- Position: Forward

Senior career*
| Years | Team | Apps | (Gls) |
| 1992–1993 | Dinamo București | 21 | (5) |
| 1993 | Hapoel Tel Aviv | 13 | (1) |
| 1994 | Hapoel Beit She'an | | |
| Total | | 34 | (6) |

International career
| 1993 | Ghana U20 | 2 | (0) |
| 1991–1993 | Ghana | 2 | (1) |
- * Club domestic league appearances and goals

Nelson Samuel Mensah (born 7 December 1973) is a Ghanaian former professional footballer who played as a forward. He was the first African to play in Romania's top league.

== Club career ==
Mensah was born on 7 December 1973 in Accra, Ghana. In the middle of the 1991–92 season, he joined Dinamo București, becoming one of the first foreign players and the first African to arrive in Romania after the 1989 Revolution. On 8 March 1992, he made his Divizia A debut when coach Florin Halagian sent him in the 85th minute to replace Gábor Gerstenmájer, netting a goal one minute later in a 4–0 win over Petrolul Ploiești. He finished the season with 12 appearances and two goals scored, as the club won the title undefeated. In the following season, Mensah helped them advance past Kuusysi Lahti in the first round of the 1992–93 Champions League. Dinamo faced Olympique Marseille in the second round, where they drew 0–0 in the first leg but lost the subsequent game with 2–0, the French ultimately winning the competition. In the same season he scored three goals in three league victories against Rapid București, Petrolul and Sportul Studențesc București. Subsequently, Mensah joined Hapoel Tel Aviv, making 13 appearances and scoring once in the first half of the 1993–94 Liga Leumit season. For the second half of the season, he went to play for second-tier club Hapoel Beit She'an and helped them gain promotion to the first league.

== International career ==
Mensah played two games for Ghana's under-20 team in the 1993 World Youth Championship, and both were draws against Uruguay and Germany in the group stage. He did not play in the rest of the campaign due to an injury, but the team managed to reach the final, which they lost 2–1 to Brazil.

Mensah debuted for Ghana in a 1–0 victory against Nigeria during the 1991 CEDEAO Cup, scoring the goal. His second game was a friendly where he came as a substitute in a 2–0 victory against Indonesia.

== Controversy ==
On 6 June 1993, Mensah was attacked following Dinamo's match against Progresul București. After the game, while leaving the stadium, he was assaulted by several players of Progresul, with Leonard Strizu and Cosmin Olăroiu being the most aggressive. Subsequently, Mensah was hospitalized due to his injuries.

== Career statistics ==
=== Club ===
Appearances and goals by club, season and competition
| Club | Season | League | | | Cup | | Continental | | Total | |
| Club | Season | Division | Apps | Goals | Apps | Goals | Apps | Goals | Apps | Goals |
|---|---|---|---|---|---|---|---|---|---|---|
| Dinamo București | Divizia A | 1991–92 | 12 | 2 | 1 | 0 | 0 | 0 | 13 | 2 |
| Dinamo București | Divizia A | 1992–93 | 9 | 3 | 0 | 0 | 4 (Note: Appearances in the UEFA Champions League) | 0 | 13 | 3 |
| Dinamo București | Divizia A | Total | 21 | 5 | 1 | 0 | 4 | 0 | 26 | 5 |
| Hapoel Tel Aviv | Liga Leumit | 1993–94 | 13 | 1 | 0 | 0 | 0 | 0 | 13 | 1 |
| Career total | | | 34 | 6 | 1 | 0 | 4 | 0 | 39 | 6 |

=== International goals ===
Scores and results list Ghana's goal tally first. "Score" column indicates the score after each Nelson Mensah goal.

| # | Date | Venue | Opponent | Score | Result | Competition |
|---|---|---|---|---|---|---|
| 1. | 2 November 1991 | Abidjan, Ivory Coast | Nigeria | 1–0 | 1–0 | 1991 CEDEAO Cup |

== Honours ==
Dinamo București

- Divizia A: 1991–92

Ghana U20

- FIFA World Youth Championship runner-up: 1993
