= Lucian Cotora =

Romanian footballer

Personal information
- Date of birth: 16 February 1969 (age 57)
- Place of birth: Cisnădie, Romania
- Height: 1.80 m (5 ft 11 in)
- Position: Central defender

Senior career*
Years	Team	Apps	(Gls)
1987–1996	Inter Sibiu (Note: The statistics for the 1987–88 Divizia B season are unavailable.)	247	(10)
1997–1998	Dinamo București	36	(0)
1998–2000	Inter Sibiu	63	(8)
2001–2003	Extensiv Craiova	52	(1)
2004–2005	FC Sibiu	34	(1)
2006	Apulum Alba Iulia	15	(0)
2006–2007	AS Cisnădie		
Total		447	(20)

International career
1995	Romania	1	(0)
- * Club domestic league appearances and goals

Lucian Cotora (born 16 February 1969) is a Romanian former footballer who played as a central defender. His brother, Florin Cotora was also a footballer, they played together at Inter Sibiu. After he ended his playing career he worked as a youth coach.

== International career ==
Lucian Cotora played one friendly game at international level for Romania, when coach Anghel Iordănescu used him in a 1–0 loss against Greece.

== Honours ==
Inter Sibiu

- Divizia B: 1987–88
- Balkans Cup: 1990–91
