= Tudorel Cristea =

Romanian footballer

Personal information
- Date of birth: 22 April 1964 (age 62)
- Place of birth: Bucharest, Romania
- Height: 1.82 m (6 ft 0 in)
- Positions: Left midfielder; centre-back

Youth career
- 1972–1982: Steaua București

Senior career*
Years	Team	Apps	(Gls)
1982–1984	Mecanică Fină București		
1984–1985	FCM Brașov	37	(3)
1986–1990	Sportul Studențesc București	152	(24)
1991–1992	Dinamo București	29	(5)
1992–1993	Progresul București	17	(8)
1993	Dinamo București	3	(0)
1994	Royal Cappellen		
1994–1995	Național București	22	(5)
1995–2000	Sportul Studențesc București	126	(14)
Total		386	(59)

International career
1986–1991	Romania	9	(0)

Managerial career
- 2010: Phoenix Ulmu
- * Club domestic league appearances and goals

Tudorel Cristea (born 22 April 1964) is a Romanian former footballer who played as a midfielder and defender. After he retired from his playing career he worked for a while as a manager.

== International career ==
Tudorel Cristea played nine friendly games at international level for Romania. He made his debut when he came as a substitute and replaced Nelu Stănescu at half time in a 1–1 against Iraq.

== Honours ==
Mecanică Fină București

- Divizia C: 1983–84

Dinamo București

- Divizia A: 1991–92
