= Perlat Musta =

Albanian footballer

Personal information
- Date of birth: 15 October 1958 (age 68)
- Place of birth: Vlorë, Albania
- Position: Goalkeeper

Youth career
- Partizani Tirana

Senior career*
Years	Team	Apps	(Gls)
1979–1991	Partizani Tirana	205	(2)
1991–1994	Dinamo București	7	(0)
1992–1993	→ Progresul (loan)	0	(0)
1994–1996	Partizani Tirana	29	(0)

International career
- Albania U21
1981–1993	Albania	23	(0)

Managerial career
- 1997–1998: Partizani Tirana
- 2009–2011: Kamza
- 2012: Partizani
- * Club domestic league appearances and goals

Perlat Musta (born 15 October 1958) is an Albanian former professional footballer who played as a goalkeeper. He has been considered by many pundits in Albania as one of the greatest goalkeepers in Albania. In December 2018 he was honoured for his services to Albanian football, alongside Edvin Murati and Qamil Teliti.

== Early life ==
Perlat Musta was born in Vlorë on 15 October 1958 into a family which did not have "strong" connections with football. He began to show his liking for football at the age of 10, and unlike his coevals, Musta's favourite position was goalkeeper.

== Club career ==
Musta was a product of Partizani Tirana academy, and was promoted to senior squad in 1979 and went on to play there until 1991. In January 1991, he scored from the penalty spot in a league match against Luftëtari. He left Albania in 1991 like many Albanians following the fall of communism, joining Romanian side Dinamo București. He failed to establish himself as a regular at Dinamo because of the two Romanian international goalkeepers, Florin Prunea and Florin Tene.

He played only two matches in his first season at Ştefan cel Mare in his first season, but he managed to win his first and only Champion of Romania title. He was loaned to Progresul București, but returned to Dinamo București. In 1994 he returned to Partizani Tirana where he played as starter in the next two seasons and also served as goalkeeper Coach.

== International career ==
Musta had a successful youth international career, winning the Balkan Youth Championship twice in 1978 and 1981.

He made his senior debut for Albania in a September 1981 FIFA World Cup qualification match against Finland and earned a total of 23 caps, scoring no goals.

His final international was a June 1993 World Cup qualification against Denmark. He was also once the captain of the team in a match against Romania, which took place in 1987 at the Steaua Stadium.

== Personal life ==
His daughter Aulona Musta is an Albanian blogger and social media celebrity.

== Career statistics ==
Appearances and goals by national team and year
National team	Year	Apps	Goals	Goals Conceded
Albania	1981	3	0	10
Albania	1982	2	0	1
Albania	1983	5	0	8
Albania	1984	3	0	5
Albania	1985	4	0	4
Albania	1986	2	0	5
Albania	1987	2	0	6
Albania	1993	2	0	6
Total		23	0	45

== Honours ==
Partizani Tirana

- Albanian Superliga: 1978–79, 1980–81, 1986–87
- Albanian Cup: 1979–80, 1990–91

Dinamo București

- Liga I: 1991–92

Albania U21

- Balkan Youth Championship: 1978, 1981
