= Gábor Gerstenmájer =

Romanian footballer

Personal information
- Date of birth: 13 September 1967 (age 59)
- Place of birth: Satu Mare, Romania
- Height: 1.84 m (6 ft 0 in)
- Position: Attacking midfielder

Senior career*
Years	Team	Apps	(Gls)
1987–1990	Olimpia Satu Mare		
1988	→ Victoria Carei (loan)		
1990–1991	Brașov	31	(15)
1991–1993	Dinamo București	46	(33)
1993–1994	Luzern	46	(12)
1995–1999	Schaffhausen (Note: The statistics for the 1998–99 season are unavailable.)	95	(36)
1999–2001	Winterthur	72	(22)
2001–2002	Baden	13	(1)
2002–2003	Frauenfeld		
Total		303	(119)

International career
1992	Romania	3	(0)

Managerial career
- 2008: FC Bruhl
- 2013–2014: Red Star Zürich
- 2014–2015: Baden
- 2017: Young Fellows Juventus (assistant)
- 2018–2020: FC Wetzikon
- 2026–: FC Greifensee
- * Club domestic league appearances and goals

Gábor Gerstenmájer (born 13 September 1967) is a Romanian former footballer who played as an attacking midfielder. He was the Divizia A top-scorer, netting 21 goals during the 1991–92 season while playing for Dinamo București. Following his success with Dinamo, he moved to Switzerland and played there until his retirement.

== Club career ==
Gerstenmájer was born on 13 September 1967 in Satu Mare, Romania, being of German Swabian descent. From 1987 to 1990, he played for Divizia B club Olimpia Satu Mare, with a short interruption in 1988, when he played for Victoria Carei. During these years, he learned a lot about football from coach Iosif Vigu. Subsequently, he joined Brașov, making his Divizia A debut on 12 August 1990 under coach Ioan Nagy in a 3–0 win over Inter Sibiu, scoring the final goal of the game.

In 1991, Gerstenmájer was signed by Dinamo București. He was the top-scorer of the 1991–92 season, netting a career-best 21 goals in the 30 matches under coach Florin Halagian, a performance which helped the team win the title undefeated. One of these goals was scored in a 1–1 draw against rivals Steaua București. In the same season, Gerstenmájer helped Dinamo eliminate Luis Figo's Sporting Lisbon by scoring a double in the 2–1 aggregate victory in the first round of the UEFA Cup, with their campaign ending in the following round as they lost to Genoa against whom he scored once. In the next season, Gerstenmájer scored 12 league goals as The Red Dogs finished in second place. He also scored a goal that helped them get past Kuusysi Lahti in the first round of the 1992–93 Champions League. Dinamo faced Olympique Marseille in the second round, where they drew 0–0 in the first leg but lost the subsequent game with 2–0, the French ultimately winning the competition. His last Divizia A appearance took place on 6 December 1992 in a 5–1 victory against Universitatea Craiova in which he scored a brace, totaling 77 matches with 48 goals in the competition.

Gerstenmájer was transferred for a $450,000 fee by Swiss second-tier club Luzern. He made his debut on 28 February 1993 under coach Bertalan Bicskei in a 0–0 draw against Bulle, a match in the promotion/relegation group A. In his following appearance, he scored a hat-trick in a 5–0 win over Delémont. From 8 May to 5 June, he scored five goals in five consecutive victories against Basel, Locarno, Chênois, Wil and Grasshopper which helped the team earn promotion to the first league. Afterwards, Gerstenmájer made his Nationalliga A debut on 28 July 1993 in a 2–1 away win over Neuchâtel Xamax. On 25 September, he netted a hat-trick in a 5–2 victory against Aarau and three weeks later he scored once in a 2–2 draw against Lugano. Gerstenmájer moved to Nationalliga B club Schaffhausen in 1995. In the summer of 1996, he convinced his former Dinamo teammate Zoltán Kádár to join the club. From 1999 to 2003, Gerstenmájer played for Winterthur, Baden and Frauenfeld in the Swiss lower leagues, retiring afterwards.

== International career ==
Gerstenmájer played three games for Romania in 1992, making his debut on 12 February under coach Mircea Rădulescu in a 1–0 friendly loss to Greece. His following match took place when he replaced Gheorghe Hagi for the last 20 minutes of the 5–1 victory against Wales in the 1994 World Cup qualifiers. Gerstenmájer's last appearance for the national team was a friendly which ended with a 2–0 win over Mexico.

== Managerial career ==
From 2008 to 2020, Gerstenmájer was head coach at several clubs in the Swiss lower leagues such as FC Bruhl, Red Star Zürich, Baden, FC Wetzikon, and FC Greifensee, also working as an assistant coach in 2017 for Young Fellows Juventus.

== Honours ==
Dinamo București

- Divizia A: 1991–92

Individual

- Divizia A top-scorer: 1991–92
