= Daniel Scînteie =

Romanian footballer

Personal information
- Date of birth: 1 July 1968 (age 58)
- Position: Forward

Senior career*
Years	Team	Apps	(Gls)
1984–1986	Aripile Bacău		
1987–1990	SC Bacău		
1990–1992	FC Dinamo București		
1992–1993	Selena Bacău		
1993–1994	Hapoel Be'er Sheva		
1994–1995	Hapoel Beit Shean	16	(7)
1995–1998	FCM Bacău		
1999	FC Onești		
1999–2001	Ceahlăul Piatra Neamț		
- * Club domestic league appearances and goals

Daniel Scînteie (born 1 July 1968) is a retired Romanian football striker.
