= Viorel Hizo =

Romanian football manager

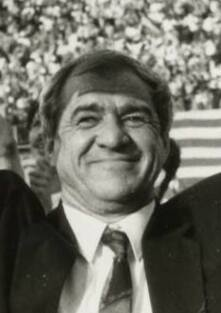
- Hizo pictured in 1994, after winning the Samsung Cup with Rapid Bucharest

Personal information
- Full name: Viorel Doru Hizo
- Date of birth: 6 February 1947 (age 79)
- Place of birth: Sibiu, Romania
- Position: Goalkeeper

Managerial career
- Years: Team
- 1984–1991: Inter Sibiu (assistant)
- 1991–1993: Inter Sibiu
- 1993–1995: Rapid București
- 1995: Progresul București
- 1995–1996: Rapid București
- 1996–1997: FC Brașov
- 1997–1998: Dinamo București
- 1998–2000: Ceahlăul Piatra Neamț
- 2001–2002: Rapid București
- 2002: Farul Constanța
- 2003–2004: Ceahlăul Piatra Neamț
- 2004: Rapid București
- 2004–2005: Chongqing Lifan
- 2005–2006: Pandurii Târgu Jiu
- 2006–2007: FC Vaslui
- 2007–2008: Ceahlăul Piatra Neamț
- 2008: FC Vaslui
- 2009: Rapid București
- 2010: Universitatea Cluj
- 2010–2012: FC Vaslui
- 2012–2013: FC Vaslui
- 2013: Ceahlăul Piatra Neamț

Viorel Doru Hizo (born 6 February 1947) is a Romanian retired professional football manager.

== Coaching career ==
Hizo coached several top clubs in Romania, his first job as head coach was with his hometown side Inter Sibiu capturing the Balkans Cup title in 1991. He also managed Chongqing Qiche in China. He won the UEFA Intertoto Cup with FC Vaslui in 2008.

#	Name	Matches	Record	Win Rate
1.	Inter Sibiu	59	25 - 13–21	42.3%
2.	Rapid	106	56 - 15–35	52.8%
3.	Național	10	5 - 0–5	50.0%
4.	Brașov	33	11 - 5–17	33.3%
5.	Dinamo	28	14 - 2–12	50.0%
6.	Ceahlăul	119	52 - 18–49	43.7%
7.	Farul	13	5 - 1–7	38.4%
8.	Pandurii	19	4 - 5–10	21.1%
9.	Vaslui	96	47 - 26–23	
10.	Ceahlăul Piatra Neamț	3	1 - 0–2	

== Post-coaching career ==
After retiring from coaching, Hizo continued to be recognized for his contributions to Romanian football. In June 2025, he was awarded the Key to the City of Sibiu and granted the honorary title of Cetățean de Onoare (Honorary Citizen) of Sibiu. The honor, presented by Mayor Astrid Fodor, recognized his long-standing influence in football and his enduring connection to his hometown.
