= Tibor Selymes =

Romanian footballer (born 1970)

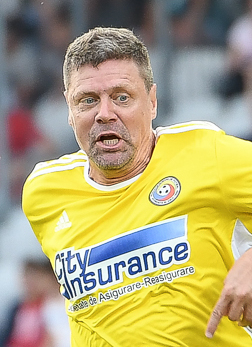
- Selymes in a charity match in 2018

Personal information
- Date of birth: 14 May 1970 (age 56)
- Place of birth: Bălan, Romania
- Height: 1.76 m (5 ft 9 in)
- Position: Left-back

Youth career
- Metalul Târgu Secuiesc
- –1988: FC Brașov

Senior career*
Years	Team	Apps	(Gls)
1988–1990	FC Brașov	64	(3)
1990–1993	Dinamo București	83	(6)
1993–1996	Cercle Brugge	83	(4)
1996–1999	Anderlecht	65	(3)
1999–2001	Standard Liège	36	(1)
2001–2002	Haladás	8	(0)
2002–2004	Debrecen	37	(4)
2004–2005	AEL Limassol	8	(1)
Total		384	(22)

International career
1992–1999	Romania	46	(0)

Managerial career
- 2005–2006: Sopron
- 2006: Sopron
- 2007–2009: Liberty Salonta
- 2009–2010: Sportul Studențesc
- 2010–2011: Astra Ploiești
- 2011: FCM Târgu Mureș
- 2011: Astra Ploiești
- 2013: Dinamo II București
- 2013: Săgeata Năvodari
- 2014: Kaposvár
- 2014–2015: Oțelul Galați
- 2015: Petrolul Ploiești
- 2016: Delta Tulcea
- 2017: Olimpia Satu Mare
- 2018–2019: Politehnica Iași (sporting director)
- 2022–2024: Știința Miroslava
- 2025: Politehnica Iași (academy technical director)
- 2025–2026: Politehnica Iaşi
- * Club domestic league appearances and goals

Tibor Selymes (born 14 May 1970) is a Romanian football manager and former player.

== Playing career ==
Born in Bălan of Hungarian descent, Selymes made his debut in Divizia A with FC Brașov in 1988. He later played many years in Belgium.

Selymes got 46 caps for the Romania national team between 1992 and 1999, and was in the squad for the 1994 World Cup, Euro 1996 and the 1998 World Cup.

== Managerial career ==
In September 2010 Selymes was appointed as manager of Astra Ploiești. He was sacked in August 2011, after only two games from the 2011–12 season, both lost by Astra. He then took control of FCM Târgu Mureș, but stayed there for only three games, resigning after one draw and two defeats. He returned to Astra in November 2011. On 16 December 2011, he was fired from Astra, the second time this season.

On 2 April 2013, Selymes returned to Dinamo, after 20 years. He signed a contract for two months to manage the second team of the club.

On 17 June 2013, he signed Săgeata Năvodari that will make its Liga I debut. On 6 January 2014, Selymes was appointed as the manager of the Hungarian League club Kaposvári Rákóczi FC. The club was relegated at the end of the 2013–14 season, and Selymes left.

In September 2014, he signed a contract with former Romanian champions Oțelul Galați. He resigned in March 2015. In June 2015, he was named the new manager of Petrolul Ploiești.

== Personal life ==
Tibor is the nephew of Nicolae Selymes, who was also an international footballer who played for Dinamo București and FC Brașov in the 1960s. In 2010 Selymes attempted to launch his own airline but ultimately failed when he did not pass the sufficient qualifications to fly an aeroplane.

== Playing statistics ==
Appearances and goals by national team and year
National team	Year	Apps	Goals
Romania	1992	2	0
Romania	1993	7	0
Romania	1994	10	0
Romania	1995	6	0
Romania	1996	10	0
Romania	1997	8	0
Romania	1998	2	0
Romania	1999	1	0
Total		46	0

== Honours ==
=== Player ===
Dinamo București

- Divizia A: 1991–92

Cercle Brugge

- Belgian Cup runner-up: 1995–96

Anderlecht

- Belgian Cup runner-up: 1996–97

Standard Liège

- Belgian Cup runner-up: 1999–2000

Haladás

- Magyar Kupa runner-up: 2001–02

Debrecen

- Magyar Kupa runner-up: 2002–03
