= FC Inter Sibiu =

Association football club in Sibiu

- Full name: Fotbal Club Inter Stars 2020 Sibiu
- Nicknames: Interiștii; Sibienii (The People from Sibiu); Bleu-Albaștrii (The Bleu and Blues)
- Short name: Inter
- Founded: 1968 (original club); 2020; 6 years ago (modern club)
- Ground: Obor
- Capacity: 2,000
- Chairman: Teodor Birț
- Manager: Mihai Ianc
- League: Liga III
- 2025–26: Liga III, Seria VI, 8th
Home colours	Away colours

Asociația Fotbal Club Inter Stars Sibiu 2020, commonly known as FC Inter Sibiu or Inter Sibiu (Romanian pronunciation: [ˌinter siˈbiw]), is a Romanian football club based in Sibiu, Sibiu County, which competes in Liga III, the third tier of the Romanian football league system.

The original club was founded in 1968 as Independența Sibiu and later became one of the most successful football teams in the history of the city. During the late 1980s it became associated with Nicu Ceaușescu, the youngest son of Romanian communist leader Nicolae Ceaușescu. Inter spent eight consecutive seasons in the Romanian top flight between 1988 and 1996, achieved its best league finish with 4th place in 1990–91, and won the 1990–91 Balkans Cup. The original club was dissolved in 2000 following financial difficulties.

The Inter name was revived in 2020 through a new club founded by businessman Teodor Birț, which began competitive activity in Liga IV in 2021. The revived side won the Liga IV Sibiu championship in 2024–25 and was promoted to Liga III for the 2025–26 season. In March 2026, the club obtained the right to use the historic FC Inter Sibiu crest, colours and sporting record.

Following the withdrawal and effective disappearance of FC Hermannstadt's senior team in the summer of 2026, Inter became the highest-ranked active football club based in the city of Sibiu. It continues to compete in Liga III in the 2026–27 season, representing the city at national level.

== History ==
=== Independența Sibiu and rise to the top flight (1968–1990) ===
FC Inter Sibiu was originally founded in the summer of 1968 under the name Independența Sibiu. The club was financially supported by the local Independența factory, a manufacturer of metallurgical machinery, and became closely associated with the Terezian neighbourhood of Sibiu.

After winning the 1968–69 Sibiu County Championship, Independența faced Carpați Covasna, the champions of Covasna County, in the promotion play-off. The Sibiu side won both legs, 2–0 at home and 2–1 away, and consequently entered Divizia C for the first time.

During the following decade, Independența alternated between the third and fourth levels of the Romanian football league system. From the early 1980s, under the administrative leadership of Mihai Găldean, chairman of the supporting factory, the club established itself more consistently in Divizia C. At the time, the most prominent football club in Sibiu was Șoimii Sibiu, a former top-flight side and long-standing member of Divizia B.

Former logo.

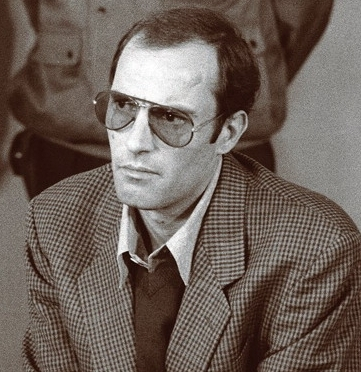
Nicu Ceaușescu

After several seasons in the upper half of Divizia C, the club was renamed AS Inter Sibiu in the summer of 1985. Although the name was sometimes assumed to have been inspired by Inter Milan, contemporary accounts state that Inter originated from a combination of In from Independența and Ter from the Terezian neighbourhood. The similarity with the Italian club was nevertheless reflected in the use of blue and black striped kits.

Inter won its Divizia C series in the 1985–86 season, finishing level on 61 points with Electromureș Târgu Mureș but taking first place and earning promotion to Divizia B.

The summer of 1986 represented a major change in Sibiu football. Inter's promotion coincided with the relegation of Șoimii Sibiu, and Inter subsequently moved to the Municipal Stadium, previously used by Șoimii. The club also adopted the name FC Inter Sibiu.

With Marian Bondrea and Viorel Hizo among its coaches and with several former Șoimii players in the squad, Inter finished 10th in its first Divizia B season. One year later, in 1987–88, the club won its series by seven points over Jiul Petroșani and achieved promotion to Divizia A for the first time.

During the latter stages of the promotion campaign, Nicu Ceaușescu, son of Romanian leader Nicolae Ceaușescu and at the time First Secretary of the Sibiu County Committee of the Romanian Communist Party, became associated with the club. His involvement subsequently became one of the more controversial aspects of Inter's history.

Former Inter coach Viorel Hizo later stated that Ceaușescu became involved only when promotion was already close to being secured and primarily assisted the club financially and with player transfers, rather than with results on the field.

Inter finished 11th in its inaugural 1988–89 Divizia A season before improving to 6th in 1989–90. Ceaușescu's association with the club ended following the Romanian Revolution of December 1989.

=== Peak years, Balkans Cup and decline (1990–2000) ===
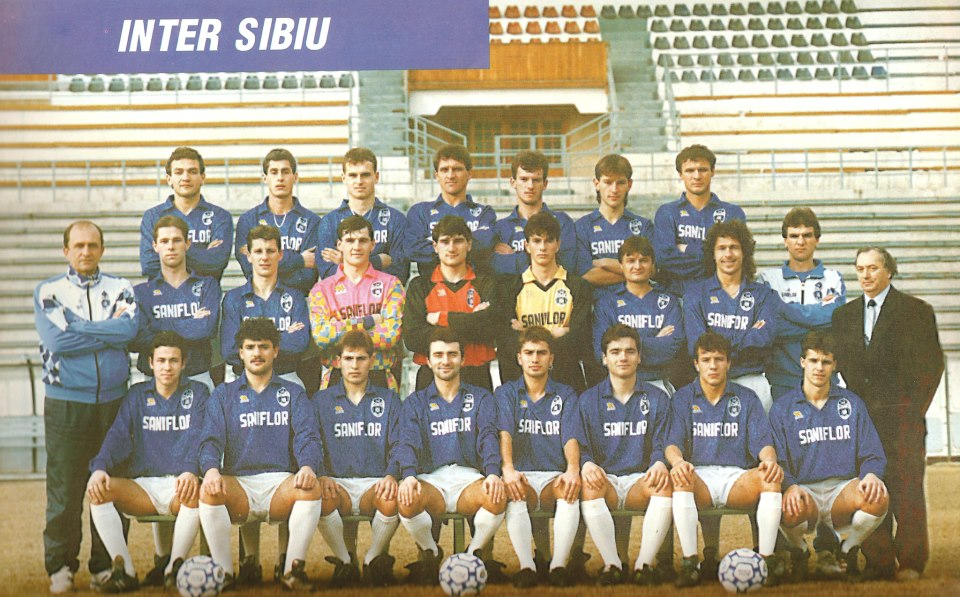
Inter Sibiu's 1990–91 squad, which won the Balkans Cup.

Inter remained one of Romania's stronger top-flight sides immediately after the fall of the communist regime. The club reached its historical peak during the 1990–91 season, finishing 4th in Divizia A, the highest league position in its history.

The same season also brought the club's only international trophy. Inter won the 1990–91 Balkans Cup, defeating Yugoslav side Budućnost Titograd 1–0 on aggregate in the final, with Laurențiu Nicolae scoring the decisive goal.

During the following seasons, Inter generally occupied mid-table positions in Divizia A. Its prolonged spell in the top flight eventually came to an end in 1995–96, when the club was relegated after eight consecutive seasons at the highest level.

Period	Name
1968–1985	Independența Sibiu
1985–1986	AS Inter Sibiu
1986–2000	FC Inter Sibiu
2000–2020	Inactive
2020–present	AFC Inter Stars Sibiu 2020 / FC Inter Sibiu

Back in Divizia B, Inter narrowly avoided a second consecutive relegation in 1996–97, finishing 15th out of 18 teams, only one point above the relegation places.

The club subsequently remained a mid-table second-division side, finishing 12th in 1997–98, 11th in 1998–99 and 9th in 1999–2000.

Increasing financial difficulties eventually proved impossible to overcome. During the first part of the 2000–01 season, FC Inter Sibiu withdrew from the championship and ceased to exist, bringing the original club's 32-year history to an end.

=== Football in Sibiu after Inter's disappearance ===
The disappearance of Inter was followed by a period of instability in Sibiu football. Șoimii Sibiu also disappeared shortly afterwards, leaving the city without either of its traditional senior clubs.

Several projects attempted to restore competitive football in Sibiu during the following years. FC Sibiu was established in the early 2000s but survived for only a few seasons. It was followed by Voința Sibiu, which rose rapidly through the divisions and reached Liga I in 2011, but was relegated after a single season and subsequently disappeared because of financial problems.

In 2015, another new club, FC Hermannstadt, was established. Hermannstadt rose from Liga IV to Liga I in three consecutive seasons, reached the 2018 Cupa României final and became Sibiu's principal senior football team for much of the following decade.

=== Revival of Inter (2020–2024) ===
A new Inter project was launched in August 2020 at the initiative of businessman Teodor Birț, the former president of FC Hermannstadt who had previously overseen that club's rise from Liga IV to Liga I.

The new organisation was established legally as AFC Inter Stars Sibiu 2020, while publicly using the historic FC Inter Sibiu identity. Birț described it at the time as a new project starting from scratch rather than the legal continuation of the club dissolved in 2000. The long-term objective was to restore the Inter name to the upper levels of Romanian football.

Because of the disruption caused by the COVID-19 pandemic, the club's first official match did not take place until April 2021, when Inter entered the Sibiu County championship.

The club also began developing a youth academy, entering teams at U16, U17 and U19 level in competitions organised by the Romanian Football Federation.

Inter dominated the 2021–22 Liga IV Sibiu season and secured the county title several rounds before the end of the championship.

In the promotion play-off, however, the Sibiu side was eliminated by Olimpic Zărnești. The first leg in Zărnești ended 1–1, before Inter lost 1–2 at home in the return match and remained in Liga IV. A subsequent appeal by Inter regarding the eligibility of an Olimpic player was rejected by the Romanian Football Federation.

Inter again challenged for honours in 2022–23, but finished second in the county championship behind ACS Mediaș. It also reached the county final of the Cupa României, losing 1–2 to FC Avrig.

During the 2023–24 season, the club adopted a stronger emphasis on young locally developed players and remained in the county championship, while Păltiniș Rășinari won the league title.

=== Return to the national leagues (2024–present) ===
Inter emerged as the dominant team in the 2024–25 Liga IV Sibiu season. The club finished first with 72 points from 26 matches, eight points ahead of AFC Agnita, while also recording the league's best attacking and defensive records, with 185 goals scored and only 23 conceded.

As county champion, Inter was drawn against the representative of Harghita County in the promotion play-off. Its scheduled opponent was unable to participate, meaning AFC Inter Stars Sibiu 2020 was awarded promotion and officially entered Liga III for the 2025–26 season.

The 2025–26 campaign marked the revived club's first season in the national leagues. Inter competed in Series VI and subsequently entered the relegation play-out, where it secured its Liga III status and finished 4th. The result ensured a second consecutive season in the third tier.

A major development regarding the club's historical identity occurred in March 2026. On 2 March, the Bucharest Court of Appeal issued a final ruling rejecting an appeal lodged by Inter Media and Communication S.p.A. As a result, AFC Inter Stars Sibiu 2020 obtained the right to use the historic FC Inter Sibiu crest, colours and sporting record, including the achievements of the former club that won the Balkans Cup in 1991.

Ahead of the 2026–27 season, Inter continued its policy of building primarily around players from Sibiu and the surrounding area, while strengthening the squad with several experienced footballers, including former Hermannstadt defender Florin Bejan.

The club's position within Sibiu football changed significantly during the summer of 2026. Following the relegation and subsequent withdrawal of FC Hermannstadt from Liga II, Hermannstadt's senior team ceased competitive activity. Inter consequently became the highest-ranked active senior football club based in the city of Sibiu, competing in Liga III. Local reports also indicated that, following Hermannstadt's collapse, potential sponsors and investors could redirect their support towards the Inter project.

For the 2026–27 campaign, the club continued to pursue the long-term objective established at the time of its revival: rebuilding FC Inter as the principal football representative of Sibiu and eventually returning the historic name to the upper divisions of Romanian football.

== Grounds ==
The club plays its home matches on Păltiniș Stadium in Rășinari, with a capacity of 300 seats. Between 1982 and 1986, Inter Sibiu played its home matches on Independența Stadium in Terezian neighborhood, Sibiu. After the 1986 promotion to Divizia B, interiștii started to play their home matches on Municipal Stadium, in Sub Arini Park zone, Sibiu.

== Honours ==
=== Domestic ===
- Liga I:
  - Best finish in Liga I: 4th (1990–91)
- Liga II:
  - Winners (1): 1987–88
- Liga III:
  - Winners (1): 1985–86
- Liga IV – Sibiu County
  - Winners (5): 1968–69, 1973–74, 1980–81, 1981–82, 2021–22
  - Runners-up (2): 2020–21, 2022–23

=== Continental ===
- Balkans Cup:
  - Winners (1): 1990–91

=== Other performances ===
- Appearances in Liga I: 8

== Club officials ==
=== Board of directors ===
Role	Name
President	(Romania) Teodor Birț
Vice-presidents	(Romania) Radu Bălă (Romania) Dănuț Sanda
Sporting Manager	(Romania) Nicolae Grigore
Organizer of Competitions	(Romania) Marius Lungu
Secretary	(Romania) Mihail Mîndreci
Delegate	(Romania) Vasile Armenean

=== Current technical staff ===
Role	Name
Manager	(Romania) Mihai Ianc
Assistant Manager	(Romania) Nicolae Grigore	(Romania) Theodor Botă
Goalkeeping Coach	(Romania) Marius Zăvoi

== League history ==
Season	Tier	Division	Place	Notes	Cupa României
2026–27	3	Liga III (Series II)	TBD		First round
2025–26	3	Liga III (Series VI)	7th / 4th	Play-out	Regional phase
2024–25	4	Liga IV (SB)	1st (C, P)	Promoted	County phase – Winners
2023–24	4	Liga IV (SB)	4th		County phase – Final
2022–23	4	Liga IV (SB)	2nd		
2021–22	4	Liga IV (SB)	1st (C)	Lost promotion play-off	
2020–21	4	Liga IV (SB)	2nd		
2001–20	Not active				
2000–01	2	Divizia B (Series II)	18th	Withdrew during season; club dissolved	
1999–00	2	Divizia B (Series II)	9th		
1998–99	2	Divizia B (Series II)	11th		
1997–98	2	Divizia B (Series II)	12th		
1996–97	2	Divizia B (Series II)	15th		Round of 16
1995–96	1	Divizia A	17th (R)	Relegated	Semi-finals
1994–95	1	Divizia A	9th		Round of 32
1993–94	1	Divizia A	8th		Round of 16
1992–93	1	Divizia A	8th		Quarter-finals
1991–92	1	Divizia A	12th		Round of 32
1990–91	1	Divizia A	4th		Semi-finals
1989–90	1	Divizia A	6th		Round of 32
1988–89	1	Divizia A	11th		Round of 16
1987–88	2	Divizia B (Series II)	1st (C, P)	Promoted	
1986–87	2	Divizia B (Series II)	10th		
1985–86	3	Divizia C (Series XI)	1st (C, P)	Promoted	
1984–85	3	Divizia C (Series XI)	7th		
1983–84	3	Divizia C (Series XI)	4th		
1982–83	3	Divizia C (Series IX)	7th		
1981–82	4	Liga IV (SB)	1st (C, P)	Promoted without play-off	
1980–81	4	Liga IV (SB)	1st (C)	Lost promotion play-off	
1979–80	4	Liga IV (SB)	4th		
1978–79	3	Divizia C (Series XI)	15th (R)	Relegated	
1977–78	3	Divizia C (Series XII)	7th		
1976–77	3	Divizia C (Series XII)	10th		
1975–76	3	Divizia C (Series XI)	4th		
1974–75	3	Divizia C (Series XII)	10th		
1973–74	4	Liga IV (SB)	1st (C, P)	Promoted	
1972–73	Independența Sibiu moved to Cisnădie and competed as Independența Cisnădie				
1971–72	3	Divizia C (Series IX)	1st (C)	Lost promotion play-off	
1970–71	3	Divizia C (Series VI)	1st (C)	Lost promotion play-off	
1969–70	3	Divizia C (Series VI)	7th		
1968–69	4	Liga IV (SB)	1st (C, P)	Promoted; club's first season	

== Notable former players ==
- (Romania) Zoltan Ritli
- (Romania) Adrian Damian
- (Romania) Marius Baciu
- (Romania) Mihail Majearu
- (Romania) Florin Cotora
- (Romania) Lucian Cotora
- (Romania) Adrian Blid
- (Romania) Gheorghe Mihali
- (Romania) Radu Niculescu
- (Romania) Marius Predatu
- (Romania) Răzvan Toboşaru
- (Romania) Bogdan Bănuță
- (Romania) Cristian Sava
- (Romania) Adrian Văsâi
- (Romania) Dorinel Munteanu
- (Romania) Ovidiu Tâlvan
- (Romania) Constantin Lazăr
- (Romania) Ovidiu Maier
- (Romania) Cezar Zamfir
- (Romania) Marius Szeghedi
- (Romania) Marian Mărgărit
- (Romania) Cătălin Popa
- (Romania) Bogdan Bucur
- (Romania) Corneliu Szeghedi
- (Romania) Dorin Zotincă
- (Romania) Mircea Bolba
- (Romania) Lucian Burchel
- (Romania) Alexandru Szenes
- (Romania) Neculai Alexa
- (Romania) Ionel Fulga
- (Romania) Cornel Cașolțan
- (Romania) Marius Pistol
- (Romania) Bogdan Mara
- (Romania) Benonie Popescu
- (Romania) Radu Neguț
- (Romania) Alex Zotincă
- (Romania) Claudiu Moldovan
- (Romania) Cristian Lazăr

== Former managers ==
- (Romania) Marian Bondrea (1986–1988)
- (Romania) Alexandru Moldovan (1990)
- (Romania) Ștefan Coidum (1991–1992)
- (Romania) Viorel Hizo (1991–1993)
- (Romania) Florin Halagian (1994–1995)
- (Romania) Cornel Țălnar (1995–1996)
- (Romania) Adrian Văsâi (1998–2000)
- (Romania) Silviu Ștefănescu
- (Romania) Jean Gavrilă
- (Romania) Gheorghe Țurlea
- (Romania) Constantin Ardeleanu
- (Romania) Ștefan Dorian
