= 1990–91 Balkans Cup =

Tournament details
- Teams: 6

Final positions
- Champions: (Romania) Inter Sibiu (1st title)
- Runners-up: (Socialist Federal Republic of Yugoslavia) Budućnost Titograd

Tournament statistics
- Matches played: 10
- Goals scored: 13 (1.3 per match)

The 1990–91 season of the Balkans Cup club tournament was the 27th season of the competition. It was won by Romanian side Inter Sibiu in the final against Yugoslav Budućnost Titograd for their first title in the competition.

== Quarter-finals ==
Team 1	Agg.	Team 2	1st leg	2nd leg
17 Nëntori Tirana (Albania)	1–2	(Socialist Federal Republic of Yugoslavia) Budućnost Titograd	0–0	1–2
Etar Veliko Tarnovo (Bulgaria)	1–2	(Greece) OFI	0–0	1–2
Inter Sibiu (Romania)		Bye	—	—
Galatasaray (Turkey)		Bye	—	—

=== First leg ===
19 September 1990

17 Nëntori Tirana (Albania)	0–0	(Socialist Federal Republic of Yugoslavia) Budućnost Titograd

Dinamo Stadium, Tirana

19 September 1990

Etar Veliko Tarnovo (Bulgaria)	0–0	(Greece) OFI

Ivaylo Stadium, Veliko Tarnovo

=== Second leg ===
2 October 1990

Budućnost Titograd (Socialist Federal Republic of Yugoslavia)	2–1	(Albania) 17 Nëntori Tirana

City Stadium, Titograd

Budućnost won 2–1 on aggregate.

2 October 1990

OFI (Greece)	2–1	(Bulgaria) Etar Veliko Tarnovo
Goal		Kola 36'

Theodoros Vardinogiannis Stadium, Heraklion

OFI won 2–1 on aggregate.

== Semi-finals ==
Team 1	Agg.	Team 2	1st leg	2nd leg
Budućnost Titograd (Socialist Federal Republic of Yugoslavia)	1–1 (a)	(Turkey) Galatasaray	0–0	1–1
OFI (Greece)	2–2 (a)	(Romania) Inter Sibiu	2–1	0–1

=== First leg ===
23 October 1990

Budućnost Titograd (Socialist Federal Republic of Yugoslavia)	0–0	(Turkey) Galatasaray

City Stadium, Titograd

24 October 1990

OFI (Greece)	2–1	(Romania) Inter Sibiu

Theodoros Vardinogiannis Stadium, Heraklion

=== Second leg ===
6 November 1990

Galatasaray (Turkey)	1–1	(Socialist Federal Republic of Yugoslavia) Budućnost Titograd
Yücedağ 55'	Report	Saveljić 75'

Ali Sami Yen Stadium, Istanbul
Referee: ? (Bulgaria)

Galatasaray 1–1 Budućnost on aggregate. Budućnost won on away goals.

6 November 1990

Inter Sibiu (Romania)	1–0	(Greece) OFI

Municipal, Sibiu

Inter Sibiu 2–2 OFI Crete on aggregate. Inter Sibiu won on away goals.

== Finals ==
Team 1	Agg.	Team 2	1st leg	2nd leg
Budućnost Titograd (Socialist Federal Republic of Yugoslavia)	0–1	(Romania) Inter Sibiu	0–0	0–1 (a.e.t.)

=== First leg ===
9 April 1991

Budućnost Titograd (Socialist Federal Republic of Yugoslavia)	0–0	(Romania) Inter Sibiu

City Stadium, Titograd
Referee: Vutsaras Maletios (Greece)

=== Second leg ===
23 April 1991

Inter Sibiu (Romania)	1–0 (a.e.t.)	(Socialist Federal Republic of Yugoslavia) Budućnost Titograd
Cotora 105'

Stadionul Municipal, Sibiu
Attendance: 17,000
Referee: Dimitar Dimitrov (Bulgaria)
