= Teleorman (river) =

- Location within Romania

Location
- Country: Romania
- Counties: Argeș, Teleorman
- Towns: Costești

Physical characteristics
- Mouth: Vedea
  - location: Ștorobăneasa
  - coordinates: 43.8571°N 25.4449°E
- Length: 169 km (105 mi)
- Basin size: 1,427 km^{2} (551 sq mi)

Basin features
- Progression: Vedea→ Danube→ Black Sea
- Tributaries
  - left: Clănița

The Teleorman is a left tributary of the river Vedea in Romania. It discharges into the Vedea near Smârdioasa. The following towns and villages are situated along the river Teleorman, from source to mouth: Gura Văii, Albota, Podu Broșteni, Broșteni, Costești, Șerboeni, Ionești, Vlăduța, Podeni, Cornățel, Recea, Izvoru, Palanga, Popești, Tătărăștii de Sus, Tătărăștii de Jos, Slăvești, Trivalea-Moșteni, Olteni, Orbeasca, Lăceni, Măgura, Vitănești, Purani, Teleormanu, Mârzănești, Cernetu and Ștorobăneasa. Its length is 169 km (105 mi) and its basin size is 1,427 km^{2} (551 sq mi).

== Tributaries ==
The following rivers are tributaries of the Teleorman (from source to mouth):

- Left: Mareș, Albota, Băidana, Negraș, Pârâul Dobrei, Clănița, Vâjiștea
- Right: Valea Copacilor, Bucov, Teleormănel
