= Clănița =

- Location within Romania

Location
- Country: Romania
- Counties: Argeș, Teleorman

Physical characteristics
- Mouth: Teleorman
  - location: Măgura
  - coordinates: 44.0268°N 25.3870°E
- Length: 81 km (50 mi)
- Basin size: 267 km^{2} (103 sq mi)

Basin features
- Progression: Teleorman→ Vedea→ Danube→ Black Sea
- Tributaries
  - left: Viroși

The Clănița is a left tributary of the river Teleorman in Romania. It discharges into the Teleorman in Măgura. The following villages are situated along the river Clănița, from source to mouth: Scurtu Mare, Talpa-Ogrăzile, Gălăteni, Clănița, Frăsinet, Băbăița and Guruieni. Its length is 81 km (50 mi) and its basin size is 267 km^{2} (103 sq mi).
