= April 18 =

April 18 this year in various calendars
- Saturday, 18 April 2026
Akan	Nwonamemene
Armenian	2 Mareri 1475
Aztec	Tlaxochimaco 18, 8 Miquiztli
Babylonian	29 Adaru, 2336 SE
Balinese pawukon	Luang, Pepet, Beteng, Laba, Keliwon, Aryang, Saniscara of Landep, Brahma, Jangur, Raja
Bengali	5 Boisakh, BS 1433
Chinese	Yang Water Dog・Stomach Mansion; Fire Horse Year, Month 3, Day 2 (Qingming, 2 days until Guyu)
Common Era	18 April 2026 CE
Coptic	10 Parmouti, AM 1742
Egyptian	2 Thoth, 2775 NE
Ethiopian	10 Miyāzyā, 2018 Amätä Məhrät
French Republican	Décade III, Nonidi de Germinal de l'Année 234 de la République
Gregorian	18 April, AD 2026
Hebrew	1 Iyar, AM 5786; Omer 16
Hindu	Aśvinī・Viṣkambha; Solar: 5 Vaiśākha, 1948 SE; Lunisolar: Pratipada, Śukla pakṣa of Vaiśākha, 2083 VE; Rāudra・5127 KY・1,872,683
Icelandic	Laugardagur, 26 Einmánuður 2025
Islamic	1 Dhu al-Qi'dah, AH 1447 (using tabular method)
ISO week date	2026-W16-6
Japanese	2 Yayoi, Reiwa 8 (Seimei, 2 days until Kokuu)
Julian	5 April, AD 2026 (AM 7534)
Julian day	2461149
Korean	2 Yongdal, 4359 DE
Maya	13.0.13.9.6; 19 Pop, 8 Cimi
Roman	Nonis Aprilibus, MMDCCLXXIX AUC
Solar Hijri	29 Farvardin, SH 1405
Tibetan	1 nag pa, me pho rta 2153 or 1772 or 1000

<<	April					>>
Su	Mo	Tu	We	Th	Fr	Sa
			1	2	3	4
5	6	7	8	9	10	11
12	13	14	15	16	17	18
19	20	21	22	23	24	25
26	27	28	29	30
2026

April 18 in recent years
2026 (Saturday)
2025 (Friday)
2024 (Thursday)
2023 (Tuesday)
2022 (Monday)
2021 (Sunday)
2020 (Saturday)
2019 (Thursday)
2018 (Wednesday)
2017 (Tuesday)

April 18 is the 108th day of the year (109th in leap years) in the Gregorian calendar; 257 days remain until the end of the year.

== Events ==
=== Pre-1600 ===
- 796 – King Æthelred I of Northumbria is murdered in Corbridge by a group led by his ealdormen, Ealdred and Wada. The patrician Osbald is crowned, but abdicates within 27 days.
- 1428 – Peace of Ferrara between Republic of Venice, Duchy of Milan, Republic of Florence and House of Gonzaga: ending of the second campaign of the Wars in Lombardy fought until the Treaty of Lodi in 1454, which will then guarantee the conditions for the development of the Italian Renaissance.
- 1506 – The cornerstone of the current St. Peter's Basilica is laid.
- 1518 – Bona Sforza is crowned as queen consort of Poland.
- 1521 – Trial of Martin Luther begins its second day during the assembly of the Diet of Worms. He refuses to recant his teachings despite the risk of excommunication.

=== 1601–1900 ===
- 1689 – Bostonians rise up in rebellion against Sir Edmund Andros.
- 1738 – Real Academia de la Historia ("Royal Academy of History") is founded in Madrid.
- 1775 – American Revolution: The British Army advances up the Charles River in Massachusetts to destroy supplies of American militias, while Paul Revere and other riders rapidly warn the countryside.
- 1783 – Three-Fifths Compromise: The first instance of black slaves in the United States of America being counted as three-fifths of persons (for the purpose of taxation), in a resolution of the Congress of the Confederation. This was later adopted in the 1787 Constitution.
- 1797 – War of the First Coalition: The Peace of Leoben is signed by Napoleon Bonaparte and Maximilian, Count of Merveldt, creating an armistice between France and Austria, setting the stage for the Treaty of Campo Formio and ending the War of the First Coalition.
- 1831 – The University of Alabama is founded in Tuscaloosa, Alabama.
- 1847 – American victory at the battle of Cerro Gordo opens the way for invasion of Mexico.
- 1857 – The Spirits Book by Allan Kardec is published, marking the birth of Spiritualism in France.
- 1864 – Battle of Dybbøl: A Prussian-Austrian army defeats Denmark and gains control of Schleswig. Denmark surrenders the province in the following peace settlement.
- 1897 – The Greco-Turkish War is declared between Greece and the Ottoman Empire.
- 1899 – The St. Andrew's Ambulance Association is granted a royal charter by Queen Victoria.

=== 1901–present ===
- 1902 – The 7.5 M_{w} Guatemala earthquake shakes Guatemala with a maximum Mercalli intensity of VIII (Severe), killing between 800 and 2,000.
- 1906 – The 7.9 M_{w}earthquake and fire destroy much of San Francisco, California, killing more than 3,000 people, making one of the worst natural disasters in American history.
- 1909 – Joan of Arc is beatified in Rome.
- 1912 – The Cunard liner RMS Carpathia brings 705 survivors from the RMS Titanic to New York City.
- 1915 – World War I: French pilot Roland Garros is shot down and glides to a landing on the German side of the lines.
- 1916 – World War I: During a mine warfare in high altitude on the Dolomites, the Italian troops conquer the Col di Lana held by the Austrian army.
- 1930 – A fire kills 118 people at a wooden church in the small Romanian town of Costești, most of them schoolchildren, after starting during Good Friday services.
- 1938 – Superman debuts in Action Comics #1 (cover dated June 1938).
- 1939 – Robert Menzies, who became Australia's longest-serving prime minister, is elected as leader of the United Australia Party after the death of Prime Minister Joseph Lyons.
- 1942 – World War II: The Doolittle Raid on Japan: Tokyo, Yokohama, Kobe and Nagoya are bombed.
- 1942 – Pierre Laval becomes Prime Minister of Vichy France.
- 1943 – World War II: Operation Vengeance, Admiral Isoroku Yamamoto is killed when his aircraft is shot down by U.S. fighters over Bougainville Island.
- 1945 – World War II: Over 1,000 bombers attack the small island of Heligoland, Germany.
- 1945 – Italian resistance movement: In Turin, despite the harsh repressive measures adopted by Nazi-fascists, a great pre-insurrectional strike begins.
- 1946 – The International Court of Justice holds its inaugural meeting in The Hague, Netherlands.
- 1946 – Jackie Robinson makes his regular season debut for the Montreal Royals of the International League, to make them the first integrated modern professional baseball team.
- 1947 – The Operation Big Bang, the largest non-nuclear man-made explosion to that time, destroys bunkers and military installations on the North Sea island of Heligoland, Germany.
- 1949 – The Republic of Ireland Act comes into force, declaring Éire to be a republic and severing Ireland's "association" with the Commonwealth of Nations.
- 1954 – Gamal Abdel Nasser seizes power in Egypt.
- 1955 – Twenty-nine nations meet at Bandung, Indonesia, for the first Asian-African Conference.
- 1972 – East African Airways Flight 720 crashes during a rejected takeoff from Addis Ababa Bole International Airport in Addis Ababa, Ethiopia, killing 43.
- 1978 – The Ba Chúc massacre begins, which precipitates the Cambodian–Vietnamese War the same year.
- 1980 – The Republic of Zimbabwe (formerly Rhodesia) comes into being, with Canaan Banana as the country's first President. The Zimbabwean dollar replaces the Rhodesian dollar as the official currency.
- 1980 – The town of Elmore City, Oklahoma holds its first dance in the town's history.
- 1988 – The United States launches Operation Praying Mantis against Iranian naval forces in the largest naval battle since World War II.
- 1988 – In Israel John Demjanjuk is sentenced to death for war crimes committed in World War II, although the verdict is later overturned.
- 1996 – The Israeli military commits the Qana massacre in a deliberate shelling of a United Nations compound near the village of Qana in southern Lebanon, killing 106 Lebanese civilians who were taking shelter there and wounding over 100 more.
- 2018 – King Mswati III of Swaziland announces that his country's name will change to Eswatini.
- 2018 – Anti-government protests start in Nicaragua.
- 2019 – A redacted version of the Mueller report is released to the United States Congress and the public.
- 2026 – Seven people are killed and fourteen others are injured in a mass shooting in Kyiv, Ukraine

== Births ==
=== Pre-1600 ===
- 359 – Gratian, Roman emperor (died 383)
- 588 – K'an II, Mayan ruler (died 658)
- 812 – Al-Wathiq, Abbasid caliph (died 847)
- 1446 – Ippolita Maria Sforza, Italian noble (died 1484)
- 1480 – Lucrezia Borgia, daughter of Pope Alexander VI (died 1519)
- 1503 – Henry II of Navarre (died 1555)
- 1534 – William Harrison, English clergyman (died 1593)
- 1580 – Thomas Middleton, English Jacobean playwright and poet (died 1627)
- 1590 – Ahmed I, Ottoman Emperor (died 1617)

=== 1601–1900 ===
- 1605 – Giacomo Carissimi, Italian priest and composer (died 1674)
- 1666 – Jean-Féry Rebel, French violinist and composer (died 1747)
- 1740 – Sir Francis Baring, 1st Baronet, English banker and politician (died 1810)
- 1759 – Jacques Widerkehr, French cellist and composer (died 1823)
- 1771 – Karl Philipp, Prince of Schwarzenberg (died 1820)
- 1772 – David Ricardo, British economist and politician (died 1823)
- 1794 – William Debenham, English founder of Debenhams (died 1863)
- 1813 – James McCune Smith, African-American physician, apothecary, abolitionist, and author (died 1865)
- 1819 – Carlos Manuel de Céspedes, Cuban lawyer and activist (died 1874)
- 1819 – Franz von Suppé, Austrian composer and conductor (died 1895)
- 1838 – Paul-Émile Lecoq de Boisbaudran, French chemist and academic (died 1912)
- 1854 – Ludwig Levy, German architect (died 1907)
- 1857 – Clarence Darrow, American lawyer (died 1938)
- 1858 – Dhondo Keshav Karve, Indian educator and activist, Bharat Ratna Awardee (died 1962)
- 1858 – Alexander Shirvanzade, Armenian playwright and author (died 1935)
- 1863 – Count Leopold Berchtold, Austrian-Hungarian politician and diplomat, Joint Foreign Minister of Austria-Hungary (died 1942)
- 1863 – Linton Hope, English sailor and architect (died 1920)
- 1863 – Siegfried Bettmann, founder of the Triumph Motorcycle Company and Mayor of Coventry (died 1955)
- 1864 – Richard Harding Davis, American journalist and author (died 1916)
- 1874 – Ivana Brlić-Mažuranić, Croatian author and poet (died 1938)
- 1877 – Vicente Sotto, Filipino lawyer and politician (died 1950)
- 1879 – Korneli Kekelidze, Georgian philologist and scholar (died 1962)
- 1880 – Sam Crawford, American baseball player, coach, and umpire (died 1968)
- 1882 – Isaac Babalola Akinyele, Nigerian ruler (died 1964)
- 1882 – Leopold Stokowski, English conductor (died 1977)
- 1883 – Aleksanteri Aava, Finnish poet (died 1956)
- 1884 – Jaan Anvelt, Estonian educator and politician (died 1937)
- 1889 – Jessie Street, Australian activist (died 1970)
- 1892 – Eugene Houdry, French-American mechanical engineer and inventor (died 1962)
- 1897 – Ardito Desio, Italian geologist and cartographer (died 2001)
- 1898 – Patrick Hennessy, Irish soldier and businessman (died 1981)
- 1900 – Bertha Isaacs, Bahamian teacher, tennis player, politician and women's rights activist (died 1997)

=== 1901–present ===
- 1901 – Al Lewis, American songwriter (died 1967)
- 1901 – László Németh, Hungarian dentist, author, and playwright (died 1975)
- 1902 – Waldemar Hammenhög, Swedish author (died 1972)
- 1902 – Giuseppe Pella, Italian politician, 32nd Prime Minister of Italy (died 1981)
- 1904 – Pigmeat Markham, African-American comedian, singer, and dancer (died 1981)
- 1905 – Sydney Halter, Canadian lawyer and businessman (died 1990)
- 1905 – George H. Hitchings, American physician and pharmacologist, Nobel Prize laureate (died 1998)
- 1907 – Miklós Rózsa, Hungarian-American composer and conductor (died 1995)
- 1911 – Maurice Goldhaber, Ukrainian-American physicist and academic (died 2011)
- 1914 – Claire Martin, Canadian author (died 2014)
- 1915 – Joy Davidman, Polish-Ukrainian American poet and author (died 1960)
- 1916 – Carl Burgos, American illustrator (died 1984)
- 1918 – Gabriel Axel, Danish-French actor, director, and producer (died 2014)
- 1918 – André Bazin, French critic and theorist (died 1958)
- 1918 – Shinobu Hashimoto, Japanese director, producer, and screenwriter (died 2018)
- 1918 – Clifton Hillegass, American publisher, founded CliffsNotes (died 2001)
- 1918 – Tony Mottola, American guitarist and composer (died 2004)
- 1919 – Virginia O'Brien, American actress and singer (died 2001)
- 1919 – Esther Afua Ocloo, Ghanaian entrepreneur and pioneer of microlending (died 2002)
- 1920 – John F. Wiley, American football player and coach (died 2013)
- 1921 – Jean Richard, French actor and singer (died 2001)
- 1922 – Barbara Hale, American actress (died 2017)
- 1924 – Clarence "Gatemouth" Brown, American singer-songwriter and guitarist (died 2005)
- 1925 – Marcus Schmuck, Austrian mountaineer and author (died 2005)
- 1926 – Doug Insole, English cricketer (died 2017)
- 1927 – Samuel P. Huntington, American political scientist, author, and academic (died 2008)
- 1927 – Tadeusz Mazowiecki, Polish journalist and politician, Prime Minister of Poland (died 2013)
- 1928 – Karl Josef Becker, German cardinal and theologian (died 2015)
- 1928 – Otto Piene, German sculptor and academic (died 2014)
- 1929 – Peter Hordern, English soldier and politician (died 2024)
- 1930 – Clive Revill, New Zealand actor and singer (died 2025)
- 1930 – Jean Guillou, French organist (died 2019)
- 1931 – Bill Miles, American director and producer (died 2013)
- 1934 – James Drury, American actor (died 2020)
- 1934 – George Shirley, African-American tenor and educator
- 1935 – Costas Ferris, Egyptian-Greek actor, director, producer, and screenwriter
- 1936 – Roger Graef, American-English criminologist, director, and producer (died 2022)
- 1936 – Vladimir Hütt, Estonian physicist and philosopher (died 1997)
- 1937 – Keiko Abe, Japanese marimba player and composer
- 1937 – Jan Kaplický, Czech architect, designed the Selfridges Building (died 2009)
- 1939 – Glen Hardin, American pianist and arranger
- 1939 – Thomas J. Moyer, American lawyer and judge (died 2010)
- 1940 – Joseph L. Goldstein, American biochemist and geneticist, Nobel Prize laureate
- 1940 – Mike Vickers, English guitarist, saxophonist, and songwriter
- 1941 – Michael D. Higgins, Irish sociologist and politician, 9th President of Ireland
- 1942 – Michael Beloff, English lawyer and academic
- 1942 – Robert Christgau, American journalist and critic
- 1942 – Jochen Rindt, German-Austrian racing driver (died 1970)
- 1944 – Kathy Acker, American author and poet (died 1997)
- 1944 – Philip Jackson, Scottish sculptor and photographer
- 1945 – Bernard Arcand, Canadian anthropologist and author (died 2009)
- 1946 – Hayley Mills, English actress
- 1947 – Moses Blah, Liberian general and politician, 23rd President of Liberia (died 2013)
- 1947 – Jerzy Stuhr, Polish actor, director, and screenwriter (died 2024)
- 1947 – James Woods, American actor and producer
- 1948 – Régis Wargnier, French director, producer, and screenwriter
- 1950 – Grigory Sokolov, Russian pianist and composer
- 1953 – Rick Moranis, Canadian-American actor, comedian, singer and screenwriter
- 1953 – Sk. Mujibur Rahman, Bengali politician
- 1954 – Michael Salvatori, American composer
- 1954 – Robert Greenberg, American pianist and composer
- 1958 – Gabi Delgado-López, Spanish-German singer, co-founder of D.A.F. (died 2020)
- 1958 – Malcolm Marshall, Barbadian cricketer and coach (died 1999)
- 1959 – Susan Faludi, American journalist, author and feminist
- 1960 – Yelena Zhupiyeva-Vyazova, Ukrainian runner
- 1961 – Jane Leeves, English actress and dancer
- 1961 – John Podhoretz, American journalist and author
- 1962 – Jeff Dunham, American ventriloquist and comedian
- 1963 – Conan O'Brien, American television host, comedian, and writer
- 1964 – Niall Ferguson, Scottish historian and academic
- 1969 – Keith DeCandido, American author
- 1970 – Saad Hariri, Saudi Arabian-Lebanese businessman and politician, 33rd Prime Minister of Lebanon
- 1970 – Willie Roaf, American football player
- 1971 – David Tennant, Scottish actor
- 1972 – Rosa Clemente, American journalist and activist
- 1972 – Eli Roth, American actor, director, producer, and screenwriter
- 1973 – Derrick Brooks, American football player
- 1973 – Haile Gebrselassie, Ethiopian runner
- 1974 – Edgar Wright, English filmmaker
- 1976 – Melissa Joan Hart, American actress
- 1976 – Andrew Ng, British-born American artificial intelligence researcher
- 1979 – Matt Cooper, Australian rugby league player
- 1979 – Kourtney Kardashian, American television personality
- 1981 – Audrey Tang, Taiwanese Minister of Digital Affairs and programmer
- 1983 – Miguel Cabrera, Venezuelan baseball player
- 1984 – America Ferrera, American actress
- 1985 – Łukasz Fabiański, Polish footballer
- 1986 – Tina Bru, Norwegian politician
- 1988 – Vanessa Kirby, English actress
- 1989 – Alia Shawkat, American actress
- 1990 – Wojciech Szczęsny, Polish footballer
- 1992 – Chloe Bennet, American actress
- 1993 – Mika Zibanejad, Swedish ice hockey player
- 1994 – Aminé, American singer-songwriter
- 1995 – Divock Origi, Belgian footballer
- 1996 – Ski Mask the Slump God, American rapper
- 2003 – Breckie Hill, American influencer

== Deaths ==
=== Pre-1600 ===
- 727 – Agallianos Kontoskeles, Byzantine commander and rebel leader
- 850 – Perfectus, Spanish monk and martyr
- 909 – Dionysius II, Syriac Orthodox patriarch of Antioch
- 943 – Fujiwara no Atsutada, Japanese nobleman and poet (born 906)
- 963 – Stephen Lekapenos, co-emperor of the Byzantine Empire
- 1161 – Theobald of Bec, French-English archbishop (born 1090)
- 1176 – Galdino della Sala, Italian archdeacon and saint
- 1430 – John III, Count of Nassau-Siegen, German count
- 1552 – John Leland, English poet and historian (born 1502)
- 1555 – Polydore Vergil, English historian (born 1470)
- 1556 – Luigi Alamanni, Italian poet and politician (born 1495)
- 1567 – Wilhelm von Grumbach, German adventurer (born 1503)
- 1587 – John Foxe, English historian and author (born 1516)

=== 1601–1900 ===
- 1636 – Julius Caesar, English judge and politician (born 1557)
- 1650 – Simonds d'Ewes, English lawyer and politician (born 1602)
- 1674 – John Graunt, English demographer and statistician (born 1620)
- 1689 – George Jeffreys, 1st Baron Jeffreys, Welsh judge and politician, Lord Chancellor of Great Britain (born 1648)
- 1732 – Louis Feuillée, French astronomer, geographer, and botanist (born 1660)
- 1742 – Arvid Horn, Swedish general and politician (born 1664)
- 1763 – Marie-Josephte Corriveau, Canadian murderer (born 1733)
- 1794 – Charles Pratt, 1st Earl Camden, English lawyer, judge, and politician, Lord Chancellor of Great Britain (born 1714)
- 1796 – Johan Wilcke, Swedish physicist and academic (born 1732)
- 1802 – Erasmus Darwin, English physician and botanist (born 1731)
- 1832 – Jeanne-Elisabeth Chaudet, French painter (born 1761)
- 1859 – Tatya Tope, Indian general (born 1814)
- 1864 – Juris Alunāns, Latvian philologist and linguist (born 1832)
- 1873 – Justus von Liebig, German chemist and academic (born 1803)
- 1890 – Paweł Bryliński, Polish sculptor (born 1814)
- 1898 – Gustave Moreau, French painter and academic (born 1826)

=== 1901–present ===
- 1906 – Luis Martín, Spanish religious leader, 24th Superior-General of the Society of Jesus (born 1846)
- 1912 – Martha Ripley, American physician (born 1843)
- 1917 – Vladimir Serbsky, Russian psychiatrist and academic (born 1858)
- 1923 – Savina Petrilli, Italian religious leader (born 1851)
- 1936 – Milton Brown, American singer and bandleader (born 1903)
- 1936 – Ottorino Respighi, Italian composer and conductor (born 1879)
- 1938 – George Bryant, American archer (born 1878)
- 1942 – Aleksander Mitt, Estonian speed skater (born 1903)
- 1942 – Gertrude Vanderbilt Whitney, American heiress, sculptor and art collector, founded the Whitney Museum of American Art (born 1875)
- 1943 – Isoroku Yamamoto, Japanese admiral (born 1884)
- 1945 – John Ambrose Fleming, English physicist and engineer, invented the vacuum tube (born 1849)
- 1945 – Ernie Pyle, American journalist and soldier (born 1900)
- 1947 – Jozef Tiso, Slovak priest and politician, President of Slovakia (born 1887)
- 1951 – Óscar Carmona, Portuguese field marshal and politician, 11th President of Portugal (born 1869)
- 1955 – Albert Einstein, German-American physicist, engineer, and academic (born 1879)
- 1958 – Maurice Gamelin, Belgian-French general (born 1872)
- 1963 – Meyer Jacobstein, American academic and politician (born 1880)
- 1964 – Ben Hecht, American director, producer, and screenwriter (born 1894)
- 1965 – Guillermo González Camarena, Mexican engineer (born 1917)
- 1974 – Marcel Pagnol, French author, playwright, and director (born 1895)
- 1988 – Oktay Rıfat Horozcu, Turkish poet and playwright (born 1914)
- 1995 – Arturo Frondizi, Argentinian lawyer and politician, 32nd President of Argentina (born 1908)
- 2002 – Thor Heyerdahl, Norwegian ethnographer and explorer (born 1914)
- 2004 – Kamisese Mara, Fijian politician, 2nd President of Fiji (born 1920)
- 2008 – Germaine Tillion, French ethnologist and anthropologist (born 1907)
- 2012 – Dick Clark, American television host and producer, founded Dick Clark Productions (born 1929)
- 2012 – René Lépine, Canadian businessman and philanthropist (born 1929)
- 2012 – Robert O. Ragland, American musician (born 1931)
- 2012 – K. D. Wentworth, American author (born 1951)
- 2013 – Goran Švob, Croatian philosopher and author (born 1947)
- 2013 – Anne Williams, English activist (born 1951)
- 2014 – Guru Dhanapal, Indian director and producer (born 1959)
- 2014 – Sanford Jay Frank, American screenwriter and producer (born 1954)
- 2014 – Brian Priestman, English conductor and academic (born 1927)
- 2019 – Lyra McKee, Irish journalist (born 1990)
- 2022 – Harrison Birtwistle, British composer (born 1934)
- 2024 – Dickey Betts, American guitarist, singer, songwriter and composer (born 1943)
- 2024 – Mandisa, American gospel singer (born 1976)

== Holidays and observances ==
- Christian feast day:
  - Anthusa of Constantinople
  - Cyril VI of Constantinople (Eastern Orthodox Church)
  - Eleutherius and Antia
  - Galdino della Sala
  - Blessed Marie of the Incarnation
  - Molaise of Leighlin
  - Perfectus
  - Blessed Savina Petrilli
  - April 18 (Eastern Orthodox liturgics)
- Army Day (Iran)
- Coma Patients' Day (Poland)
- Friend's Day (Brazil)
- Independence Day (Zimbabwe)
- International Day For Monuments and Sites
- Invention Day (Japan)
- Victory over the Teutonic Knights in the Battle of the Ice (Russia; Julian Calendar)
- World Amateur Radio Day
