= Ungheni, Argeș =

Ungheni
- Commune
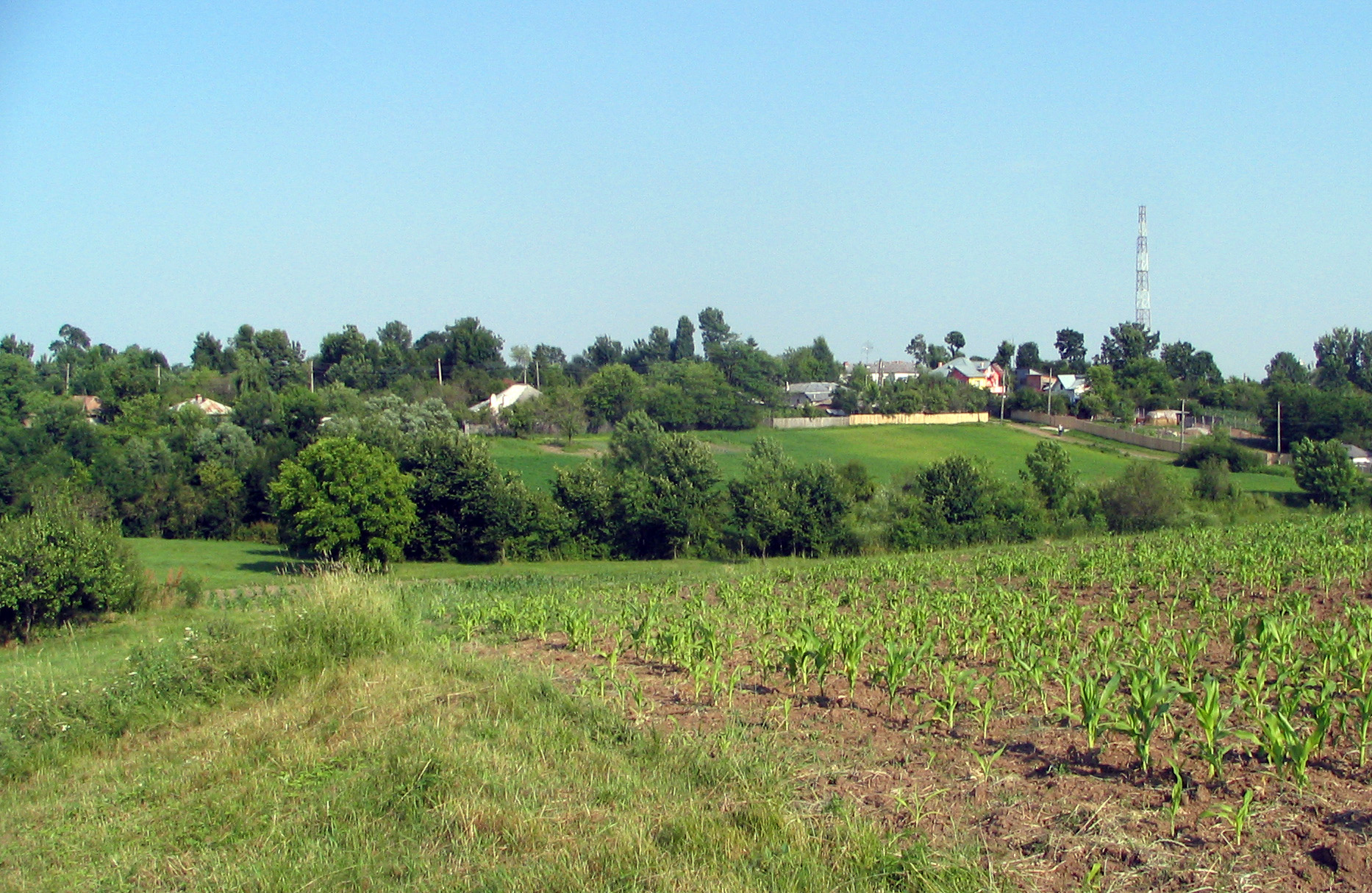

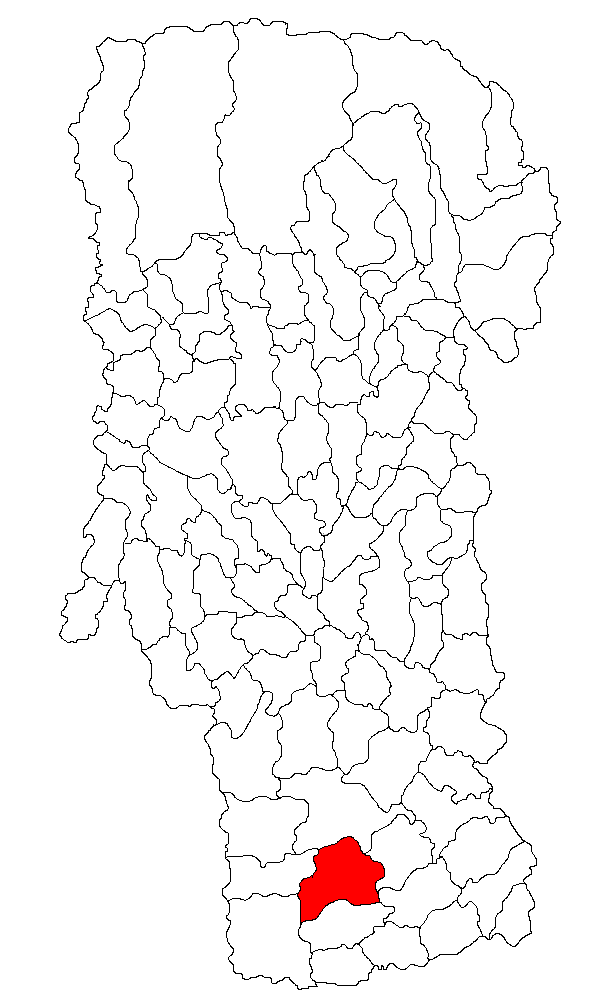
- Location in Argeș County

- Location in Romania
- Coordinates: 44°30′N 24°58′E
- Country: Romania
- County: Argeș
- Population (2021-12-01): 2,349
- Time zone: UTC+02:00 (EET)
  - Summer (DST): UTC+03:00 (EEST)
- Vehicle reg.: AG

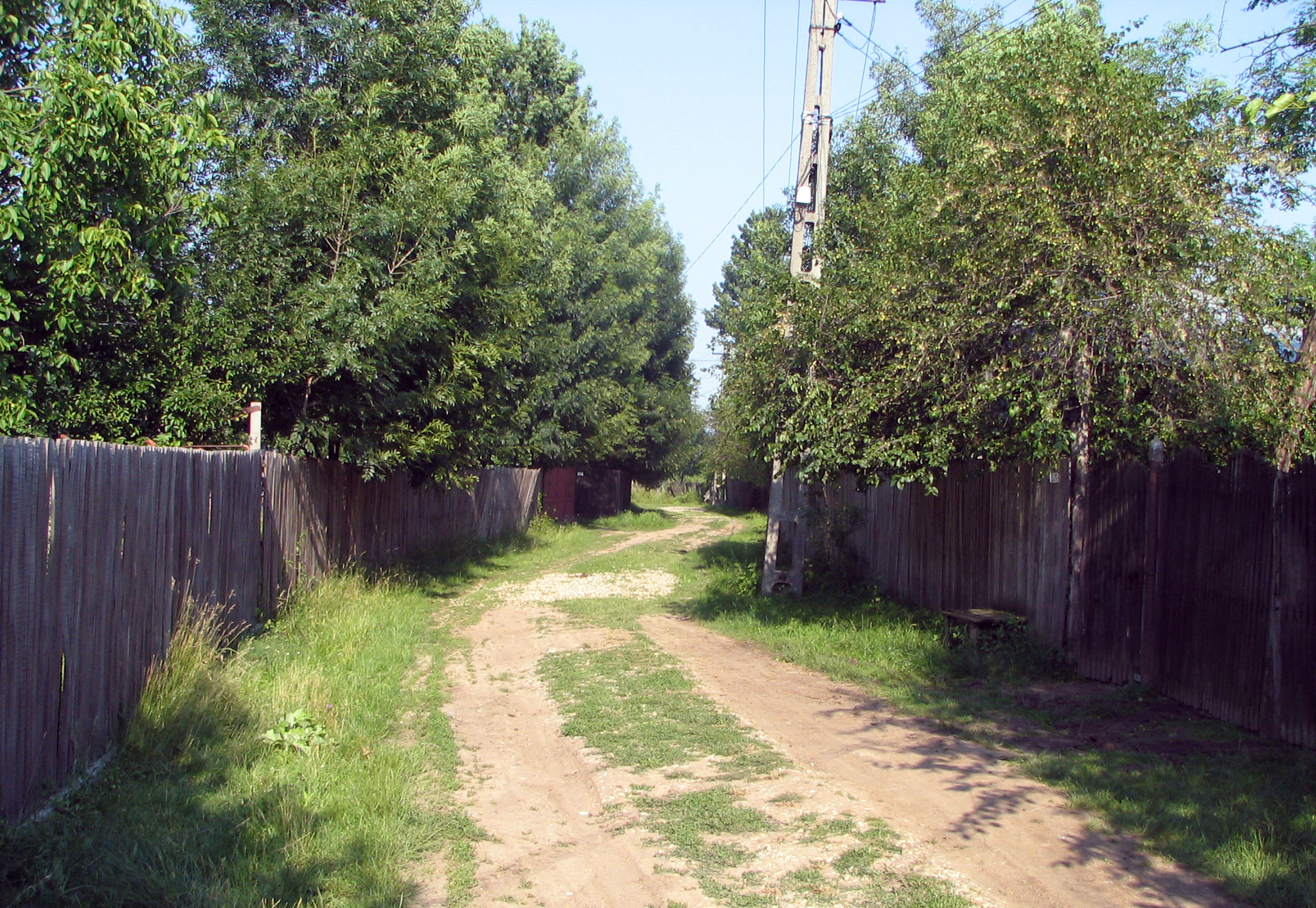
A dirt road through Ungheni

Ungheni is a commune in the southwestern part of Argeș County, Muntenia, Romania. It is composed of six villages: Colțu, Găujani, Goia, Humele, Satu Nou and Ungheni.

Nearby localities are Recea (to the east), Miroși (to the south), Stolnici (to the west) and Buzoești (to the north). The National Road DN65A Pitești - Costești - Roșiorii de Vede - Turnu Măgurele goes through Ungheni. The nearest river is Teleorman.
