= Teleorman =

Teleorman may refer to:

- Teleorman County, a county of Romania
- Teleorman (river), a river in southern Romania
- The Teleorman, a Romanian navy longboat lost in the Sinking of the Teleorman

== See also ==
- Diocese of Alexandria and Teleorman
- Teleormanu, a village in Mârzănești, Romania
