= Ștorobăneasa =

- Commune
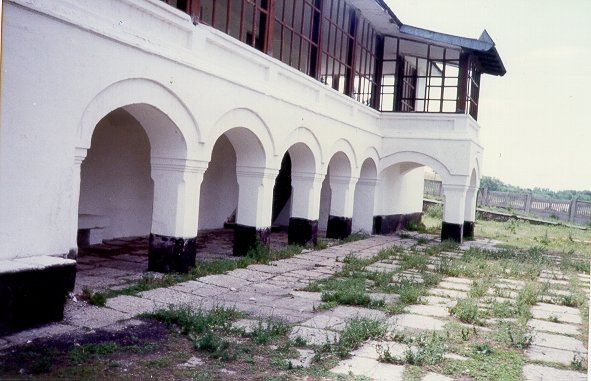
- The Noica Mansion in Ștorobăneasa

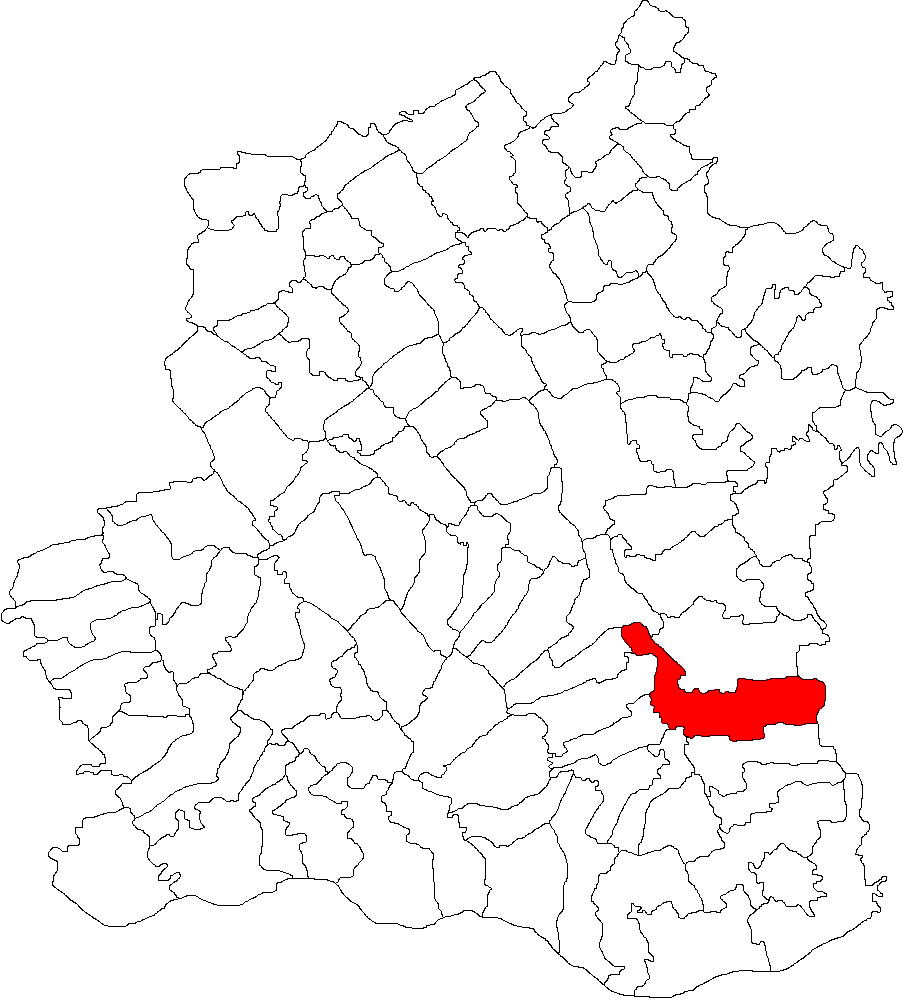
- Location in Teleorman County

- Location in Romania
- Coordinates: 43°53′N 25°27′E
- Country: Romania
- County: Teleorman
- Subdivisions: Beiu, Ștorobăneasa

Government
  - Mayor (2024–2028): Mugurel Putineanu (AUR)
- Area: 91.48 km^{2} (35.32 sq mi)
- Elevation: 34 m (112 ft)
- Population (2021-12-01): 2,655
  - Density: 29.02/km^{2} (75.17/sq mi)
- Time zone: UTC+02:00 (EET)
  - Summer (DST): UTC+03:00 (EEST)
- Postal code: 147375
- Area code: +(40) 247
- Vehicle reg.: TR
- Website: comunastorobaneasa.ro

Ștorobăneasa is a commune in the southern part of Teleorman County, Muntenia, Romania, on the left side of the Teleorman River. The commune had 2,655 inhabitants as of 2021 and a surface of 352.8 ha (872 acres) within the built-up area. It is composed of two villages, Beiu and Ștorobăneasa.

== Geography ==
Situated in the Burnasului Plain, in the central part of the Wallachian Plain, Ștorobăneasa Commune shows a uniform and monotonous landscape. The commune is crossed by the Teleorman and Vedea rivers, which meet in Beiu. With a temperate-continental climate the area is characterized through high temperature, low precipitations, and frequent periods of drought.

The commune is located the southeastern part of Teleorman County, on the border with Giurgiu County, 18 km (11 mi) southeast of the county seat, Alexandria, and 30 km (19 mi) north of Zimnicea, a port on the Danube.

Ștorobăneasa borders the following communes: Brânceni and Smârdioasa to the west, Mârzănești to the north, Cervenia to the south, and Gogoșari (Giurgiu County) to the east.

== Economy ==
The economic activity of the commune is generally concentrated on agriculture and livestock.

=== Projects ===
- Water supply system in Ștorobăneasa.
- Construction of the Ștorobăneasa Kindergarten.

== Tourism ==
Noica Mansion is one of Ștorobăneasa's tourist objectives. It cannot be visited at this time, as the building is in conservation. The building has been vandalized twice: first by the communist authorities after the owners were arrested (later assassinated in jail), and second after being return to its rightful owner, Radu Noica, a German citizen. The building (in a good state in 2005), was vandalized, doors stolen, windows broken, some walls hammered down. Villagers turned the adjacent land in a garbage dump. It was saved just before the collapse in 2015 by a foreign buyer that recognized its particular architectural style and decided to put in conservation. Its renovation date is still pending, the complicated bureaucratic regime of historical monuments in Romania, its location outside of a major city, as well as the bad will of the local community pushing back the renovation date.
