= Lăceni =

Lăceni may refer to several villages in Romania:

- Lăceni, a village in the town of Costeşti, Argeș County
- Lăceni, a village in Orbeasca Commune, Teleorman County
