= Vâjiștea =

- Location within Romania

Location
- Country: Romania
- Counties: Teleorman County
- Villages: Răsmirești, Schitu Poienari

Physical characteristics
- Mouth: Teleorman
  - location: Teleormanu
  - coordinates: 43.9611°N 25.4555°E
- Length: 17 km (11 mi)
- Basin size: 97 km^{2} (37 sq mi)

Basin features
- Progression: Teleorman→ Vedea→ Danube→ Black Sea

The Vâjiștea is a left tributary of the river Teleorman in Romania. It discharges into the Teleorman in the village Teleormanu. Its length is 17 km (11 mi) and its basin size is 97 km^{2} (37 sq mi).
