= Ungheni (disambiguation) =

Ungheni may refer to:

- Ungheni, a city in the Republic of Moldova
- Ungheni district, a district in the Republic of Moldova
- Ungheni, Mureș, a city in Mureș County, Romania
- Ungheni, Argeș, a commune in Argeș County, Romania
- Ungheni, Iași, a commune in Iaşi County, Romania
- Ungheni, a village in Răucești Commune, Neamţ County, Romania
