= Negrilești =

Negrilești may refer to several places in Romania:

- Negrilești, Bistrița-Năsăud, a commune in Bistrița-Năsăud County
- Negrilești, Vrancea, a commune in Vrancea County
- Negrilești, Galați, a commune in Galați County
- Negrilești, a village in Scurtu Mare Commune, Teleorman County
