= Goleasca =

Goleasca may refer to several villages in Romania:

- Goleasca, a village in Recea, Argeș
- Goleasca, a village in Bucșani, Giurgiu
