= Valea Părului =

Valea Părului may refer to several villages in Romania:

- Valea Părului, a village in Beceni Commune, Buzău County
- Valea Părului, a village in Mârzănești Commune, Teleorman County
