= Scurtu =

Scurtu may refer to several entities in Romania:

- Scurtu, a tributary of the Răstolița in Mureș County
- Scurtu Mare, a commune in Teleorman County
- Scurtu, a village in Berlești Commune, Gorj County
