= Savina Petrilli =

Religious figure (1851–1923)

Blessed Savina Petrilli
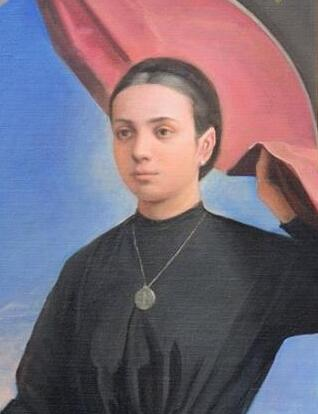
- Born: 29 August 1851; Siena, Grand Duchy of Tuscany
- Died: 18 April 1923 (aged 71); Siena, Kingdom of Italy
- Venerated in: Catholic Church
- Beatified: 24 April 1988, Saint Peter's Square, Vatican City by Pope John Paul II
- Feast: 18 April
- Patronage: Sisters of the Poor of Saint Catherine of Siena

Savina Petrilli (29 August 1851 - 18 April 1923) was an Italian Catholic professed religious who founded the Sisters of the Poor of Saint Catherine of Siena upon receiving the encouragement of Pope Pius IX.

Petrilli devoted her congregation to alleviating the conditions of needy girls and the poor who came seeking help. The first house outside their native Italy to be opened by the Sisters after their foundation was in Brazil, though Petrilli continued to direct the house in Siena, living there until her death from cancer in 1923.

Her beatification took place on April 24, 1988. She is commemoration in the current edition of the Roman Martyrology on 18 April, Where the entry (in Latin) reads 'Siena in Tuscany, Blessed Savina Petrilli, virgin, who founded the Congregation of the Sisters of St Catherine of Siena to bring aid to needy girls and to the poor.' The same date is that of her feastday in local liturgical calendars.o

== Life ==
Savina Petrilli was born on 29 August 1851 in Siena, the second daughter of Celso Petrilli and his wife Matilde Venturini; her elder sister was Emilia. In 1861, at the age of ten, Savina read an account of the life of Catherine of Siena that instilled in her a strong devotion to Catherine. In 1863, at the then usual age of twelve, she had her First Communion.

At the age of fifteen she joined the local group of the Marian movement, the Daughters of Mary and was to become its president in 1873. In 1868, aged seventeen, she made a private vow pledging to remain a virgin. The following year, in 1869 she was received in a private audience by Pope Pius IX. On hearing that she was from Siena, the Pope suggested that she found a religious congregation devoted to Catherine of Siena. Accepting this advice, Savina confided her intentions to her sister Emilia, who was on the verge of death.

Along with five others, Savina made her profession as a religious on 15 August 15, 1873, which is regarded as the date of foundation of her congregation in a little chapel in her family's house. The Archbishop of Siena, Enrico Bindi, who was present for the occasion, gave approval to the new congregation under the name of the Sisters of the Poor of Saint Catherine of Siena. Savina and the other newly professed sisters occupied a new house together on 7 September 1874. In 1881 the Sisters opened a house at Onano, in the Province of Viterbo, some 100 kilometres (62 mi) northwest of Rome and in 1903 they took the courageous step of opening their first mission outside Italy, in Brazil. The papal decree of praise for the congregation (a necessary step in the procedure for approval) was issued by Pope Leo XIII in 1891. Approbation as a congregation of pontifical right came initially on September 5, 1899 and the process of approbation was completed on June 17, 1906 by means of a decree approving the congregation's constitutions, granted under the pontificate of Pope Pius X.

Savina died in Siena of cancer on April 18, 1923, at 5:20 pm. Her congregation now operates in Latin America in Brazil, Argentina and Uruguay, but spread also to the United States of America, India and the Philippines. As of 2005 there were 589 religious women in a total of 87 houses.

== Beatification ==
The beatification process for Savina began on 21 June 1922 with a diocesan process in her home diocese of in Siena. Such a process involves the compiling of evidence regarding her life and in particular her significant religious activities. The process was able also to take possession of her writings in order that they could be examined by theologians to ascertain if they adhered to the magisterium of the Catholic Church. A decree was issued by the Holy See on December 21, 1968, declaring them free from religious error.

On October 15, 1981 the Congregation for the Causes of Saints in Rome, which oversees proceedings with regard to the canonization of saints, formally opened the Roman phase of the process, a move that bestowed on Savina Petrilli the posthumous title of Servant of God. This constitutes the first stage in the process. Rome subsequently granted a decree of ratification to what had been achieved by the diocesan process at Siena, recognizing that it had completed all the tasks assigned to it. With this act, came the closure of the Siena process.

In 198r, the Positio - a large dossier on Savina's religious activity as well as a biographical account - was compiled and submitted to the Congregation for the Causes of Saints for its own examination. The positive results led to Pope John Paul II proclaiming Savina Petrilli to be Venerable on November 16, 1985.

According to the laws of the Catholic Church a single miracle was needed for Savina's beatification. Such a miracle was notified to the authorities and was investigated in the diocese of origin and in 1986 was authenticated and the report sent to Rome for extensive evaluation. In 1987 Pope John Paul II approved the findings on the reported miracle, a healing, and declared it to be a credible miracle. On April 24, 1988, in Saint Peter's Square, the Pope celebrated the solemn Mass during which he beatified Savina Petrilli.
