= Stan Ghițescu =

Romanian politician (1881–1952)

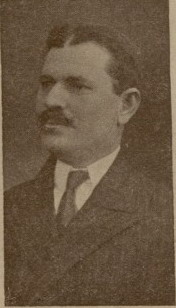

Minister of Labour
- In office 4 July 1940 – 4 September 1940
- Prime Minister: Ion Gigurtu
- Preceded by: Mihai Ralea
- In office 4 September 1940 – 14 September 1940
- Prime Minister: Ion Antonescu
- Succeeded by: Vasile Iașinschi

Personal details
- Born: 2 June 1881 Mârzănești, Teleorman County, Kingdom of Romania
- Died: 25 February 1952 (aged 70) Sighet Prison, Romanian People's Republic
- Party: People's Party; National Agrarian Party; National Christian Party; National Renaissance Front; Iron Guard
- Occupation: Politician

Stan Ghițescu (2 June 1881 – 25 February 1952) was a Romanian politician.

Born in Mârzănești, Teleorman County, he attended a normal school and entered Alexandru Averescu's People's Party. He served as mayor of Roșiorii de Vede from 1920 to 1921. In 1926, he was elected vice president of the Assembly of Deputies. He later joined Octavian Goga's National Agrarian Party, which subsequently merged with the National-Christian Defense League to form the National Christian Party. He became general secretary of the new party, and while Goga was Prime Minister from December 1937 to March 1938, served as Minister of Cooperation. He took part in the 1938 formation of the National Renaissance Front, the sole party under King Carol II. He served as Minister of Labor in two cabinets during the summer of 1940: under Ion Gigurtu from 4 July to 4 September, and under Ion Antonescu from 4 to 14 September until the establishment of the National Legionary State. Arrested under the new communist regime, he was sent to Sighet Prison in May 1950, and died there nearly two years later. He was buried in a mass grave.
