= Tătărăștii de Sus =

- Commune
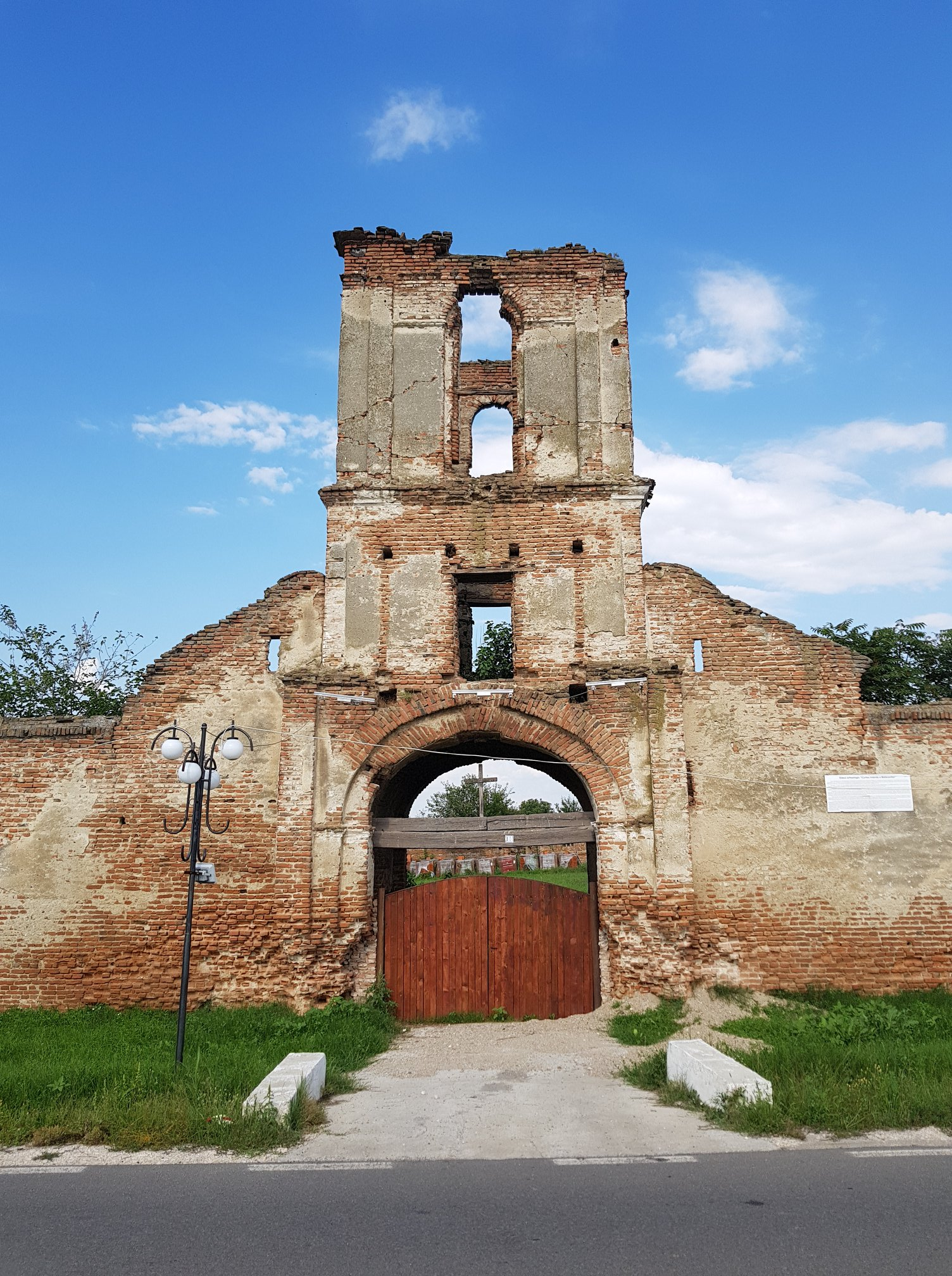
- Ruins of the Bălăceanu boyar family estate

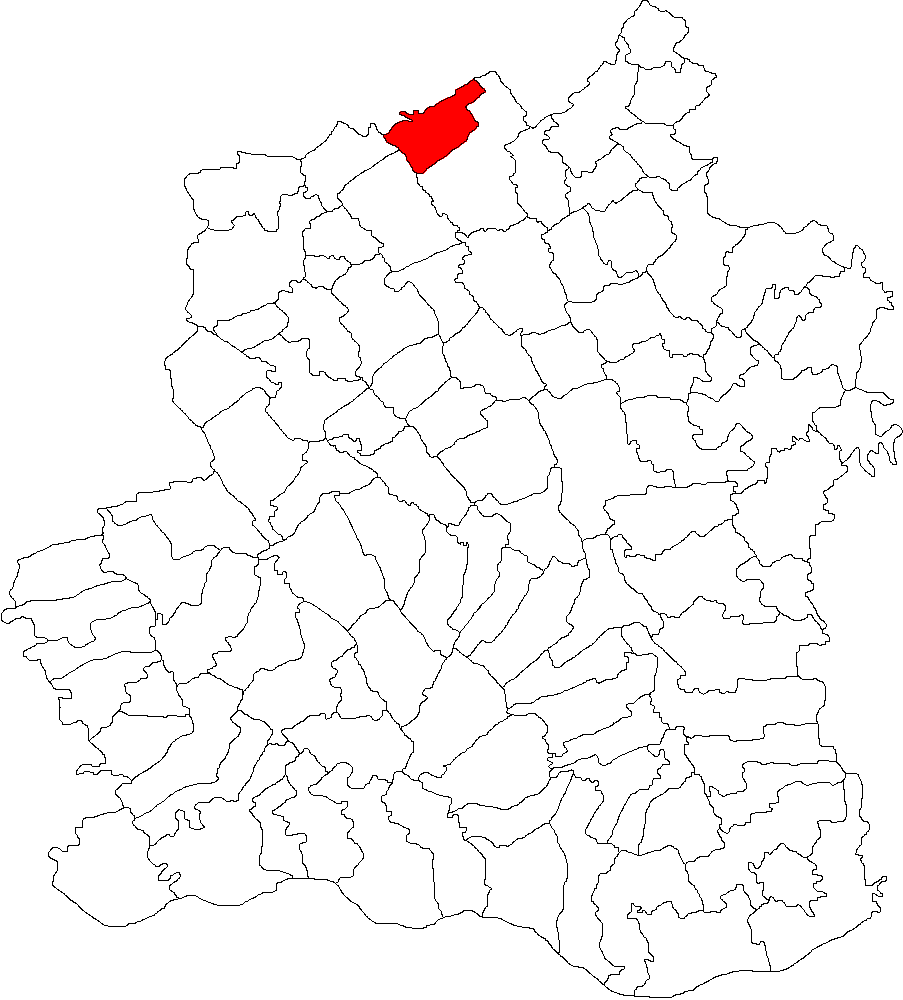
- Location in Teleorman County

- Location in Romania
- Coordinates: 44°25′N 25°07′E
- Country: Romania
- County: Teleorman
- Subdivisions: Dobreni, Tătărăștii de Sus, Udupu

Government
  - Mayor (2020–2024): Bogdan Alexandru Dumitrescu (PNL)
- Area: 60 km^{2} (23 sq mi)
- Elevation: 125 m (410 ft)
- Population (2021-12-01): 2,781
  - Density: 46/km^{2} (120/sq mi)
- Time zone: UTC+02:00 (EET)
  - Summer (DST): UTC+03:00 (EEST)
- Postal code: 147400
- Area code: +(40) 247
- Vehicle reg.: TR
- Website: comunatatarastiidesus.com

Tătărăștii de Sus is a commune in Teleorman County, Muntenia, Romania. It is composed of three villages: Dobreni, Tătărăștii de Sus, and Udupu.

The commune lies in the Wallachian Plain, on the banks of the Teleorman River. It is located in the northern part of the county, on the border with Argeș County.
