= Albota =

- Commune
- Location in Romania
- Coordinates: 44°46′53″N 24°50′53″E
- Country: Romania
- County: Argeș

Government
  - Mayor (2020–2024): Ion Dumitru (PSD)
- Area: 59 km^{2} (23 sq mi)
- Elevation: 302 m (991 ft)
- Population (2021-12-01): 4,037
  - Density: 68/km^{2} (180/sq mi)
- Time zone: UTC+02:00 (EET)
  - Summer (DST): UTC+03:00 (EEST)
- Postal code: 117030
- Area code: +(40) 248
- Vehicle reg.: AG
- Website: www.cjarges.ro/en/web/albota/

Albota is a commune in Argeș County, Muntenia, Romania. It is composed of five villages: Albota, Cerbu, Frătești, Gura Văii, and Mareș.

The commune is traversed by the DN65 road, which connects Pitești to Slatina. The Teleorman River has its source in Gura Văii.

== History ==
At the end of the 19th century, the commune was part of the Pitești plasă of Argeș County and consisted of the villages of Morlevești, Moșneni-Albotești and Albota de Sus, with a total population of 500. The commune had two churches and a rural school. At that time, the territory of the present-day commune also included the communes of Cerbu and Mareș, which were likewise part of the same plasa. The former consisted of the villages of Arnota and Cerbu and had a total population of 478, one church and a rural school. The latter consisted of the villages of Frătești, Grădiștea and Mareș, with a combined population of 922, two churches (one stone church in Grădiștea and one wooden church in Mareș), and a primary school.

The 1925 Socec Yearbook records the communes as part of the Cotmeana plasă of the same county. Albota commune had 1,118 inhabitants in the villages of Albota de Jos, Albota de Sus and Moșteni; Cerbu commune had the same composition and a population of 732; while Mareș commune had 1,152 inhabitants in the villages of Grădiștea, Toncești and Mareș and the hamlet of Frătești. In 1931, the communes of Cerbu and Mareș were abolished, and their villages were incorporated into Albota commune, which then consisted of the villages of Albota de Jos, Albota de Sus, Arnota, Cerbu, Grădiștea, Mareș and Toncești.

In 1950, Albota commune was transferred to the Pitești raion of the Argeș Region. In 1968, it was returned to Argeș County, which was re-established that year. At the same time, the villages of Albota de Jos and Albota de Sus were merged to form the village of Albota.

Historical population
Year	Pop.	±%
2002	3,895	—
2011	3,842	−1.4%
2021	4,037	+5.1%
Source: Census data

== Natives ==
- Sanda Movilă (1900–1970), poet and novelist
- Marin Radu (born 1956), football player and manager
