= Daniel Tudor (footballer) =

Romanian footballer and coach

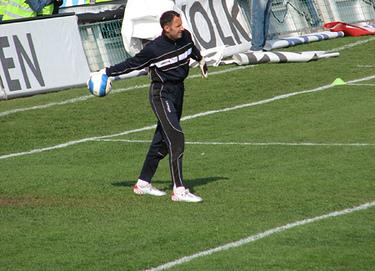

Personal information
- Full name: Daniel Ovidiu Tudor
- Date of birth: 1 June 1974 (age 52)
- Place of birth: Frăsinet, Romania
- Height: 1.93 m (6 ft 4 in)
- Position: Goalkeeper

Team information
- Current team: Universitatea Craiova (GK coach)

Youth career
- –1993: Metalul Frăsinet

Senior career*
Years	Team	Apps	(Gls)
1993–1995	Flacăra Moreni (Note: The statistics for the 1993–94 Divizia B season are not available.)	19	(0)
1995–2003	Dinamo București	10	(0)
1997	→ Flacăra Moreni (loan)		
1998	→ Farul Constanța (loan)	7	(0)
1998–2000	→ Rocar București (loan)	33	(0)
2000–2002	→ Universitatea Craiova (loan)	19	(0)
2003–2006	Fehérvár	81	(1)
2006–2008	UTA Arad	47	(0)
2008–2010	Unirea Urziceni	13	(0)
2011	Juventus București	7	(0)
Total		236	(1)

Managerial career
- 2011–2012: CFR Cluj (GK coach)
- 2012–2013: CFR Cluj (GK coach)
- 2013–2014: Kuban Krasnodar (GK coach)
- 2015–2017: Krasnodar (GK coach)
- 2017: Akhmat Grozny (GK coach)
- 2018: Dinamo București (GK coach)
- 2018: Arsenal Tula (GK coach)
- 2018–2019: Spartak Moscow (GK coach)
- 2020: Riga (GK coach)
- 2020–2021: CFR Cluj (GK coach)
- 2021–2022: Al-Ittihad (GK coach)
- 2022: Universitatea Craiova (GK coach)
- 2022–2023: Universitatea Craiova (GK coach)
- 2024–2025: Universitatea Craiova (GK coach)
- 2025: Torpedo Moscow (GK coach)
- 2025–: Universitatea Craiova (GK coach)
- * Club domestic league appearances and goals

Daniel Ovidiu Tudor (Romanian pronunciation: [daniˈel oˈvidju ˈtudor]; born 1 June 1974) is a Romanian football coach and a former goalkeeper, currently goalkeeping coach at Liga I club Universitatea Craiova.

== Career ==
Tudor was born on 1 June 1974 in Frăsinet, Romania. He began playing senior-level football in 1993 at Flacăra Moreni in Divizia B. In 1995 he joined Dinamo București where on 27 February 1996 coach Marian Bondrea gave him his Divizia A debut in a 1–0 away loss to Argeș Pitești. In the following years, Tudor was loaned by Dinamo to various teams of Romanian football, first back at Moreni, but this time in the third league, then at Farul Constanța in Divizia A. Afterwards he went to Rocar București which he helped gain promotion from the second league to the first, and his last loan spell was at Universitatea Craiova in the first league. Subsequently, he came back to Dinamo, where he won under coach Ioan Andone the 2002–03 Cupa României, keeping a clean sheet in the 1–0 win over Național București in the final, being named "The man of the match".

In July 2003, Tudor signed with Fehérvár where he was teammates with fellow Romanians Gabriel Vochin, Marian Savu and Ion Voicu. On 26 July coach János Csank gave him his Nemzeti Bajnokság I debut in a 1–1 draw against Pécsi. On 22 May 2004, he scored the only goal of his career from a penalty in a 6–1 win over Lombard Pápa. In his last season he won the 2005–06 Magyar Kupa, but coach Aurél Csertői did not use him in the final. During his period spent at Fehérvár, Tudor was nicknamed "Pink Panther", and at one point the Hungarians considered giving him Hungarian citizenship in order to play for the national team. However, he left because of some unpaid salaries, moving back to Romania at UTA Arad.

After two seasons at UTA, Tudor signed with Unirea Urziceni with whom he won the title in his first season, though coach Dan Petrescu used him in only two matches as Giedrius Arlauskis was the first-choice goalkeeper. He then participated with Urziceni in the 2009–10 Champions League group stage, where on 20 October 2009 he made his single appearance in the competition, saving a Steven Davis penalty to help his side win 4–1 with Rangers at the Ibrox Stadium. On 10 April 2010, Tudor played his last Liga I match, a 1–1 draw against FC Vaslui, totaling 114 appearances in the competition. He ended his career after playing seven games for Juventus București in the second half of the 2010–11 Liga II season.

== Honours ==
Dinamo București

- Cupa României: 2002–03

Fehérvár

- Magyar Kupa: 2005–06

Unirea Urziceni

- Liga I: 2008–09
- Supercupa României runner-up: 2009
