= Băbăița =

- Commune
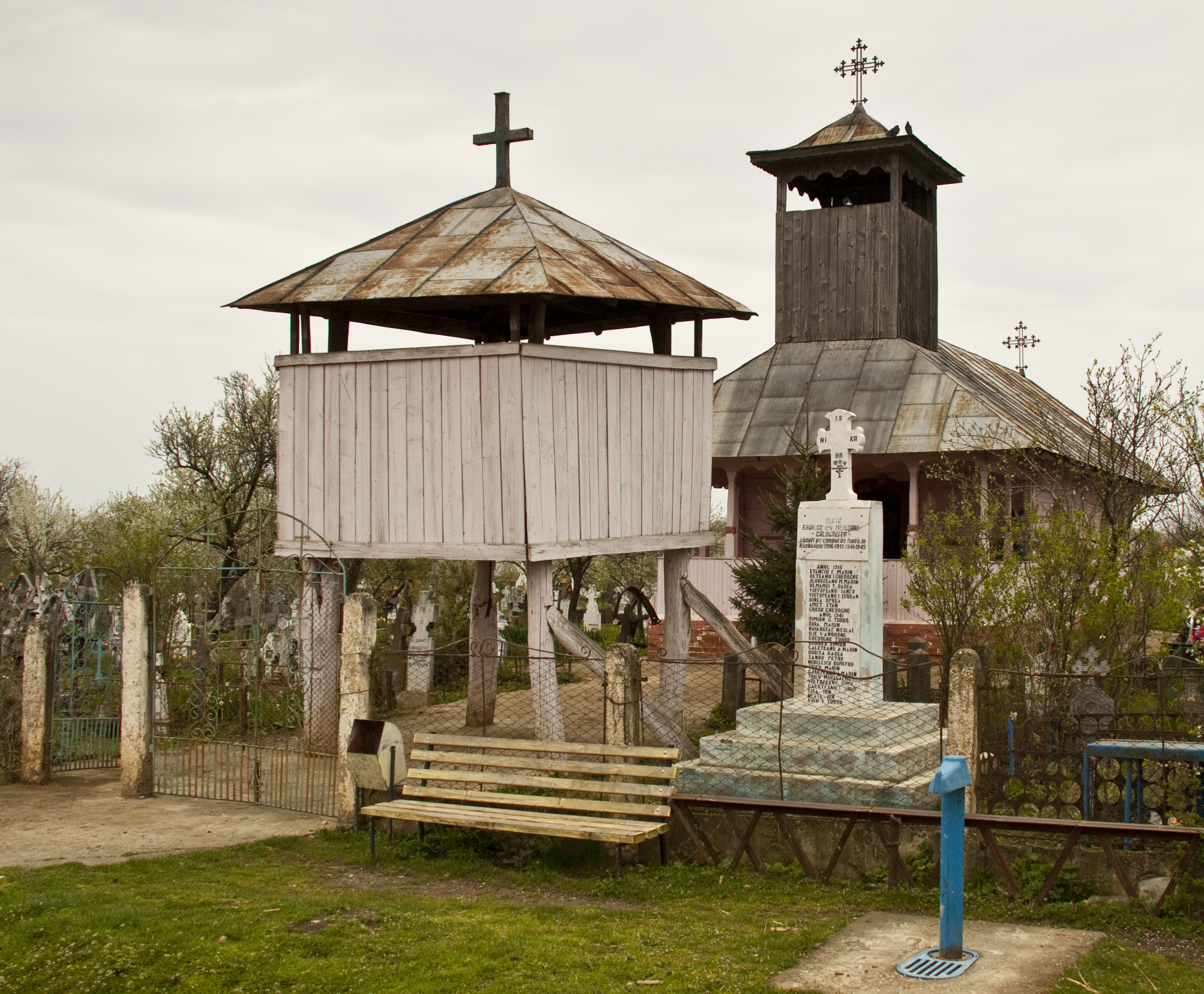
- Wooden church in Merișani

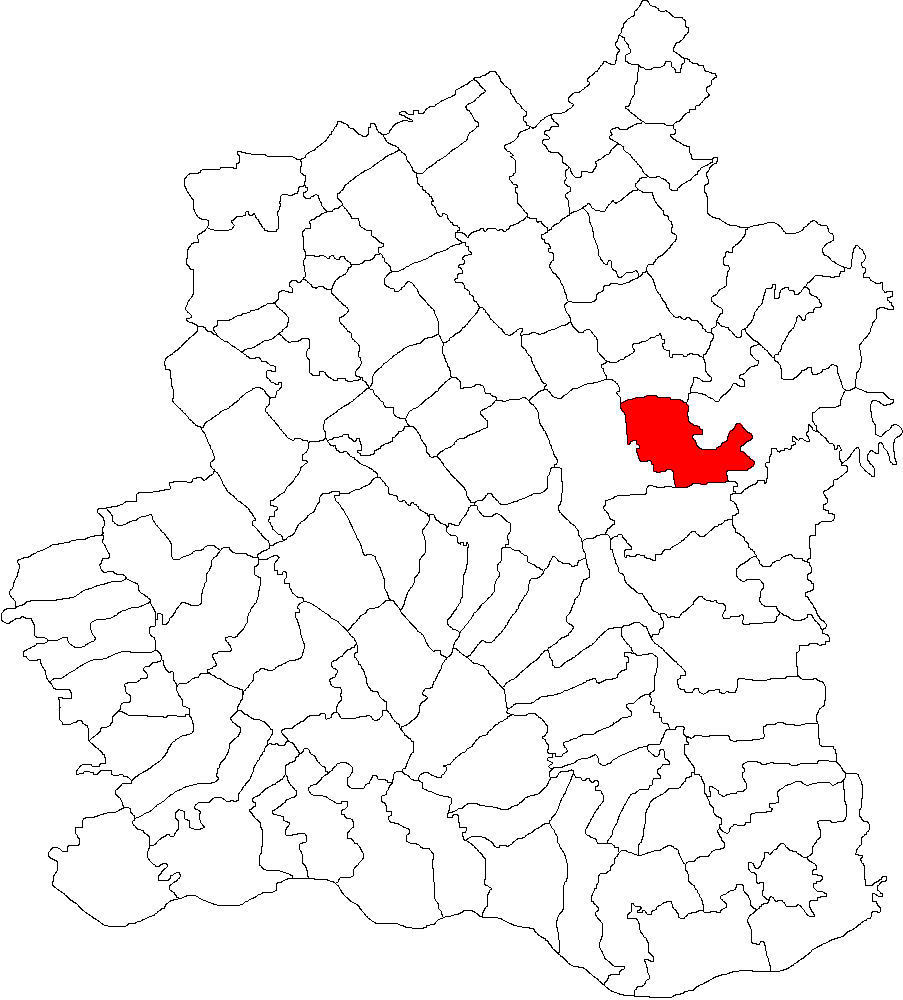
- Location in Teleorman County

- Location in Romania
- Coordinates: 44°10′N 25°23′E
- Country: Romania
- County: Teleorman
- Subdivisions: Băbăița, Merișani

Government
  - Mayor (2020–2024): Stelea Vîrtopeanu (PNL)
- Area: 52.58 km^{2} (20.30 sq mi)
- Population (2021-12-01): 2,629
  - Density: 50.00/km^{2} (129.5/sq mi)
- Time zone: UTC+02:00 (EET)
  - Summer (DST): UTC+03:00 (EEST)
- Postal code: 147010
- Vehicle reg.: TR
- Website: primariababaita.ro

Băbăița (Romanian pronunciation: [bəbəˈit͡sa]) is a commune in Teleorman County, Muntenia, Romania. It is composed of two villages, Băbăița and Merișani. It included two other villages until 2004, when they were split off to form Frăsinet Commune.

The commune is situated in the Wallachian Plain, 26 km (16 mi) north of the county seat, Alexandria.
