= 1930 Costești wooden church fire =

1930 fire in Romania

- Date: 18 April 1930
- Time: 6 p.m.
- Location: Costești, Argeș County, Romania; 44°40′11″N 24°52′48″E
- Also known as: Black Easter
- Type: Fire, stampede
- Cause: A lit candle
- Deaths: 118
- Injuries: 12
- Property damage: A wooden church destroyed

In 1930, a devastating fire destroyed the wooden church in Costești, AD, a small town in Argeș County, Romania, and killed 118 people, mostly primary school and high school students, the youngest of them being an 8-year-old girl. The event was also known in Romanian press as the Black Easter.

The fire took place on 18 April 1930, during a religious service on Good Friday, when hundreds of people from the Orthodox community gathered at the wooden church in the town, built in the eighteenth century. The church was no more than 48 square meters and so children, singers and some elders gathered in the narthex while parents listened to service from outside.

The fire broke out during Lamentations, from a candle that reached a wreath braid. The fire was extinguished immediately, but without anyone even noticing, the wreaths housed in the church attic were also ignited. The church door, with an opening width of only 60 centimetres, was locked, trapping inside 130 people. Within a few minutes, dozens of people died from smoke inhalation or burns. The shingle roof also collapsed, crushing to death many still trapped in the church. Only 14 people managed to escape, of whom two died a few days later from burns.

After the fire, the Synod of the Romanian Orthodox Church, at the initiative of Patriarch Miron Cristea, launched a national public offertory, supported by newspaper Universul, headed at that time by Stelian Popescu. From all over the country, but also abroad, from Europe and the United States, tons of aid arrived to the families of those killed. At the funeral of 116 victims Queen Marie and her grandson, King Michael I were in attendance.

Shortly after the tragedy, several parents of those killed committed suicide, feeling guilty for the death of children. Between 1932 and 1934, a new cathedral was built on the site.

Parents rushed to the door, trying to get in, to save their children. They were pushing to enter, children were struggling to get out and failed, because of their parents, that blocked their exit. That scrimmage kept them captive, prey to the flames. They all died, 116 children, all youth of the village.

— Virgil Ionescu, the last survivor of Costești tragedy in an interview for Adevărul, November 2009
