= Sinking of the Teleorman =

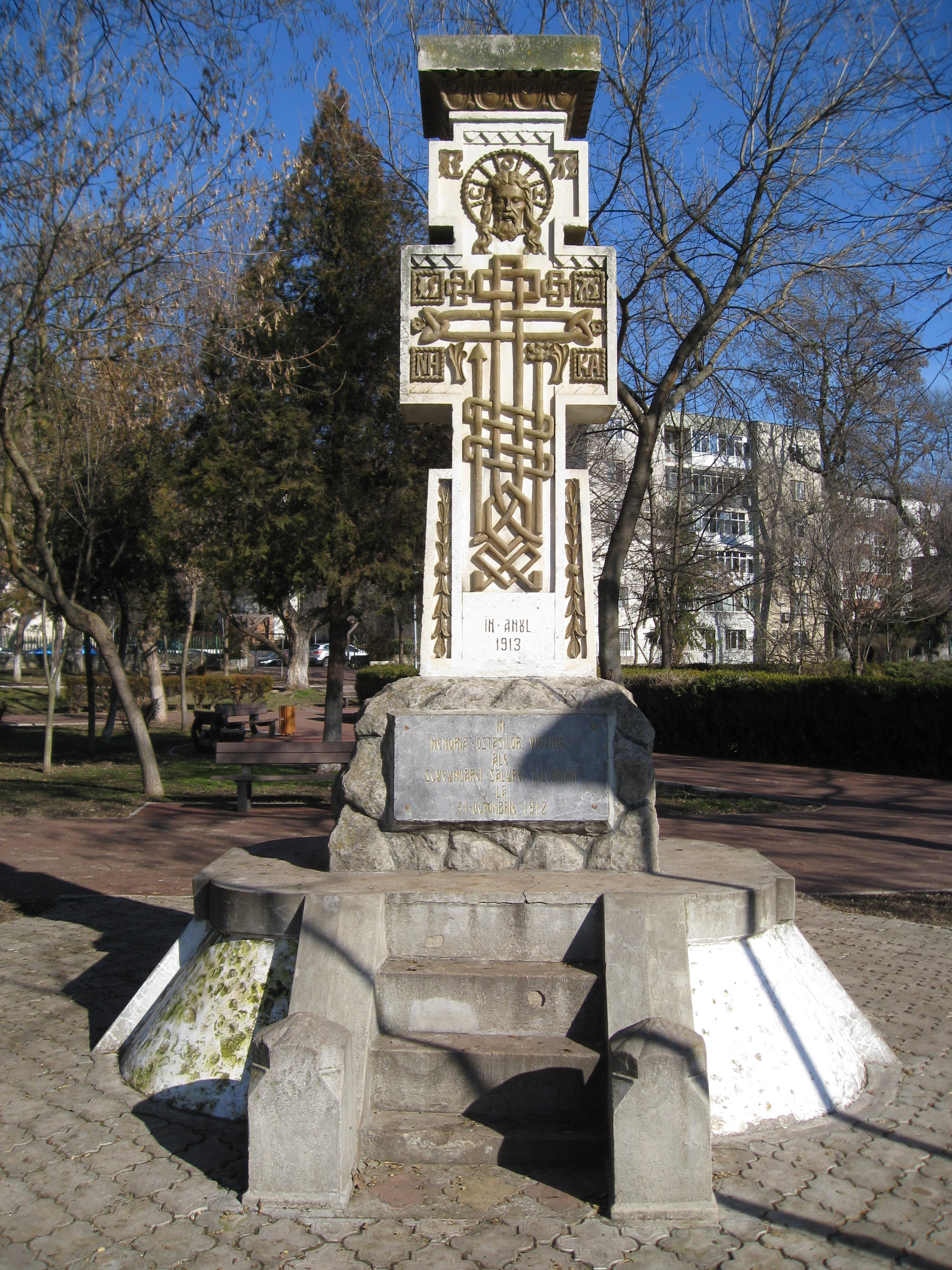
Memorial cross in Călărași

On October 31, 1912, the longboat Teleorman, a Romanian Navy vessel, was traveling on the Danube from Călărași to Ostrov. On board were 44 border guards stationed at Predeal, on the frontier with Austria-Hungary. In addition, a civilian mechanic, a stoker, a corporal and two sergeants were on the boat. The Teleorman sank upon reaching a bend in the Borcea, the Danube channel at Călărași. This occurred because the boat was too full and listed to one side at the turn. The troops were thrown to that side, causing the boat to overturn and sink. The boat was located, and telegrams requesting divers were sent to Giurgiu and Constanța. The navy sergeant commanding the vessel was rescued, as were a border guard sergeant, three soldiers and two sailors; 44 died.
