= Saint Galdino =

Roman Catholic saint

Saint Galdino della Sala
- Archbishop of Milan
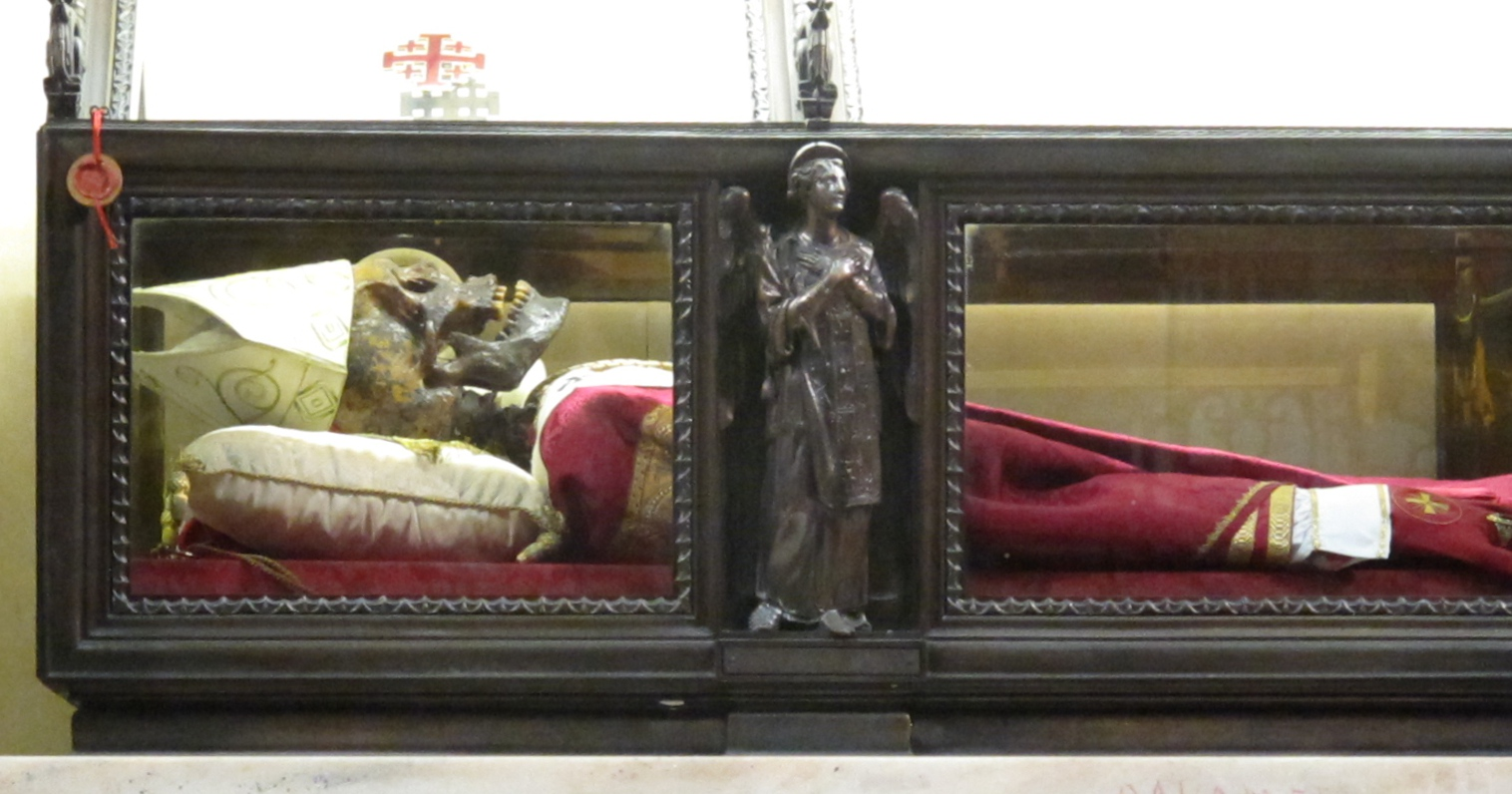
- Relics of Galdino della Sala
- Church: Roman Catholic Church
- Archdiocese: Milan
- Metropolis: Milan
- See: Milan
- Appointed: 27 March 1166
- Term ended: 18 April 1176
- Successor: Algisio da Pirovano
- Other post: Cardinal-Priest of Santa Sabina (1165-1176)

Orders
- Consecration: 18 April 1166 by Pope Alexander III
- Created cardinal: 15 December 1165 by Pope Alexander III

Personal details
- Born: Galdino della Sala c. 1096 Milan, Holy Roman Empire
- Died: 18 April 1176 (aged 79–80) Milan, Holy Roman Empire
- Buried: Cathedral of Milan, Italy

Sainthood
- Feast day: 18 April
- Venerated in: Roman Catholic Church
- Canonized: Rome, Papal States by Pope Alexander III
- Attributes: Crozier; Cardinal's attire
- Patronage: Archdiocese of Milan; Lombardy

Galdino della Sala (c. 1096 – 18 April 1176), Galdinus or Galdimus (Milanese: Galdin), was a Roman Catholic saint from Milan in northern Italy. He was a cardinal elevated in 1165 and he also served as Archbishop of Milan from 1166 to his death in 1176. He was a staunch supporter both of Pope Alexander III, and of Milan and its neighbours in Lombardy, in their joint and parallel struggles against the Antipope Victor IV, supported by Holy Roman Emperor Frederick I Barbarossa.

He is remembered also for his charity in Milan to the poor and to those imprisoned for debt. Alexander III canonized him as a saint of the Roman Catholic Church, and he is a patron of both Lombardy and his old archdiocese.

== Life ==
He was born in Milan around 1096, into the della Sala family which was considered to be minor nobility of the city.

He was a strong supporter of the Roman papacy in the schism that erupted in 1159, after the death of Pope Adrian IV. Pope Alexander III was the Roman candidate, while Antipope Victor IV was supported by Frederick Barbarossa and his cardinals. Galdino's Milanese church supported Alexander III, and Galdino, as archdeacon of the church, took a very public stand. Frederick came to besiege Milan and reduced it within six months.

Galdino joined Alexander III in Genoa and followed him to Maguelonne, Montpellier, and Clermont. He later followed him to Sicily and Rome, upon his return in 1165. When Alexander returned to the papacy in 1165, he named Galdino in the consistory of 15 December as the Cardinal Priest of the titular church of Santa Sabina, and a year later made him the Archbishop of Milan. The year after that, Alexander III made Galdino the apostolic legate for Lombardy.

When the Lombard League expelled Barbarossa, Galdino took possession of his see and began deposing any Lombard priests who were faithful to Victor IV. He consecrated new bishops at Lodi, Alba, Cremona, Vercelli, Asti, Turin, Novara, Brescia, and Alessandria.

On 18 April 1176, Galdino della Sala died in his pulpit, having just completed a sermon against the Cathars, who were seen by orthodox Catholics as heretics.

== Sainthood ==
Pope Alexander III canonized Galdino as a saint of the Roman Catholic Church during his pontificate.

His liturgical feast day in the Roman Catholic Church, celebrated particularly in churches which follow the Ambrosian Rite, is 18 April (the anniversary of his death).

== See also ==
- Guelphs and Ghibellines
- Lombard League
