= Frăsinet, Teleorman =

Frăsinet
- Commune
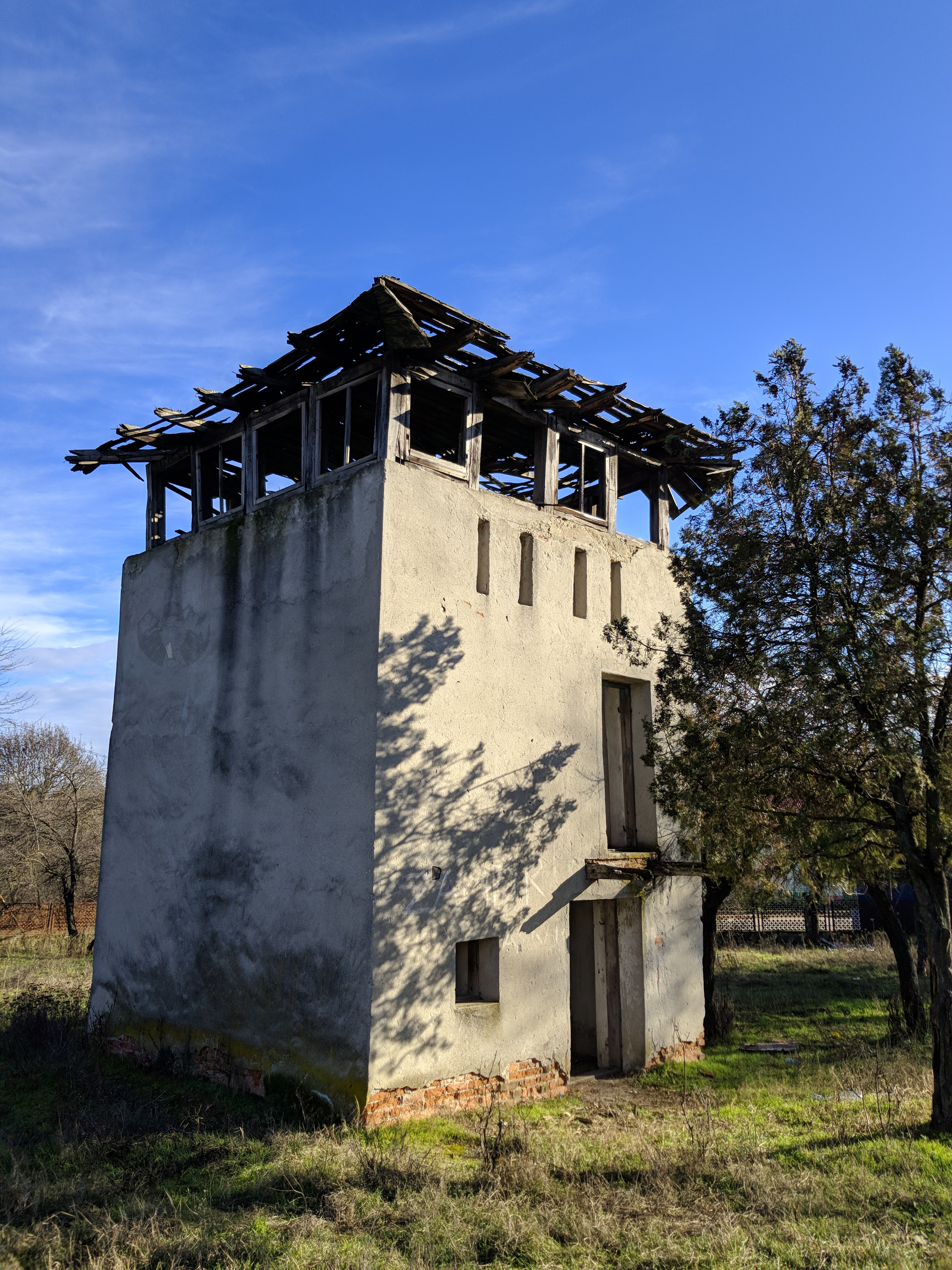
- Frăsinet observation tower, 18th century

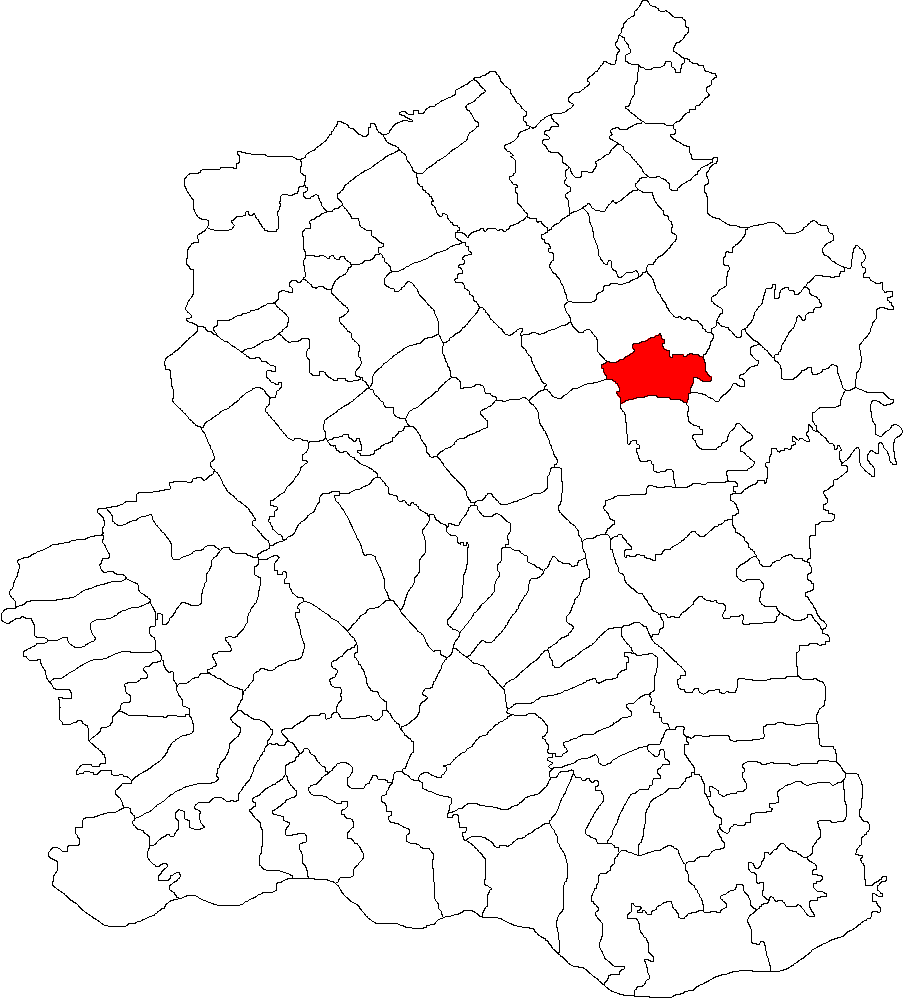
- Location in Teleorman County

- Location in Romania
- Coordinates: 44°11′N 25°23′E
- Country: Romania
- County: Teleorman
- Subdivisions: Clănița, Frăsinet

Government
  - Mayor (2020–2024): Florentin Adrian Ghimiș (PNL)
- Elevation: 97 m (318 ft)
- Population (2021-12-01): 2,148
- Time zone: UTC+02:00 (EET)
  - Summer (DST): UTC+03:00 (EEST)
- Postal code: 147012
- Area code: +(40) 247
- Vehicle reg.: TR
- Website: www.primariafrasinettr.ro

Frăsinet (Romanian pronunciation: [frəsiˈnet]) is a commune in Teleorman County, Muntenia, Romania. It is composed of two villages, Clănița and Frăsinet. These were part of Băbăița Commune until 2004, when they were split off.

== Natives ==
- Daniel Tudor (born 1974), football coach and a former goalkeeper
