= Orbeasca =

- Commune
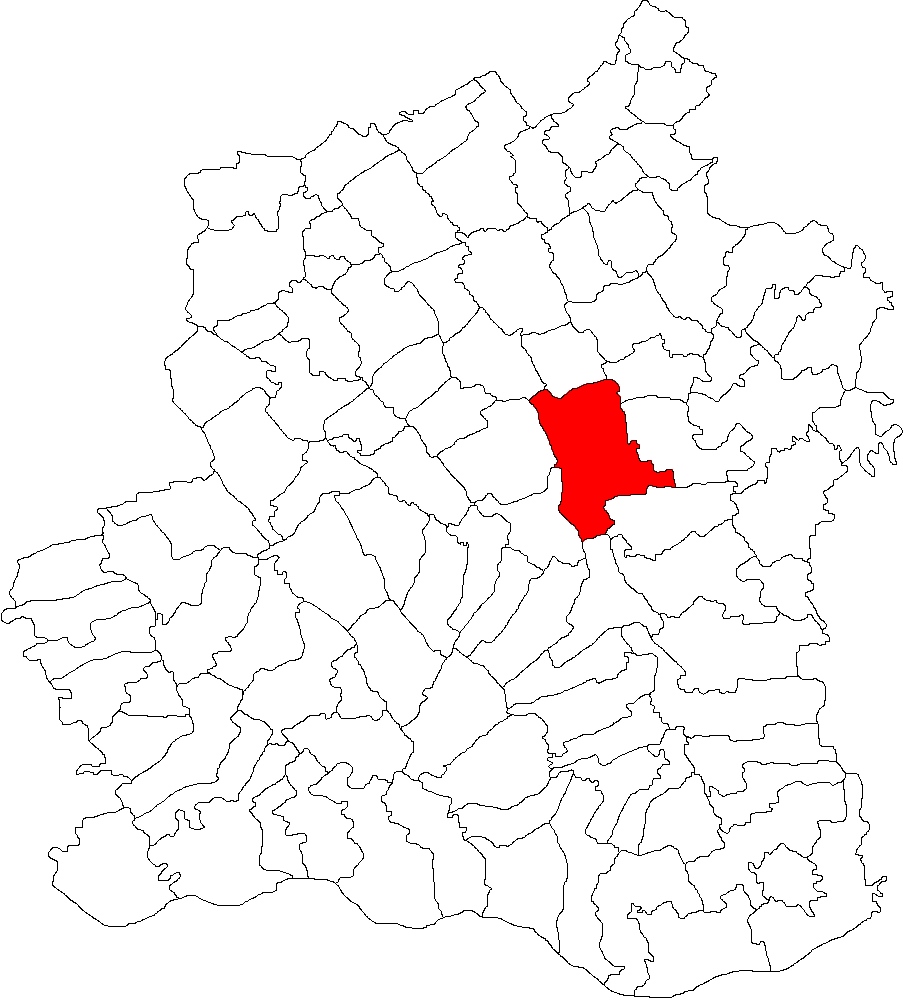
- Location in Teleorman County

- Location in Romania
- Coordinates: 44°08′N 25°19′E
- Country: Romania
- County: Teleorman
- Subdivisions: Lăceni, Orbeasca de Jos, Orbeasca de Sus

Government
  - Mayor (2020–2024): Gheorghe Budică (PSD)
- Area: 105.14 km^{2} (40.59 sq mi)
- Elevation: 65 m (213 ft)
- Population (2021-12-01): 6,472
  - Density: 62/km^{2} (160/sq mi)
- Time zone: EET/EEST (UTC+2/+3)
- Postal code: 147237
- Area code: +(40) 247
- Vehicle reg.: TR
- Website: comunaorbeasca.ro

Orbeasca is a commune in Teleorman County, Muntenia, Romania. It is composed of three villages: Lăceni, Orbeasca de Jos (the commune center) and Orbeasca de Sus.
