= Recea, Argeș =

Recea
- Commune
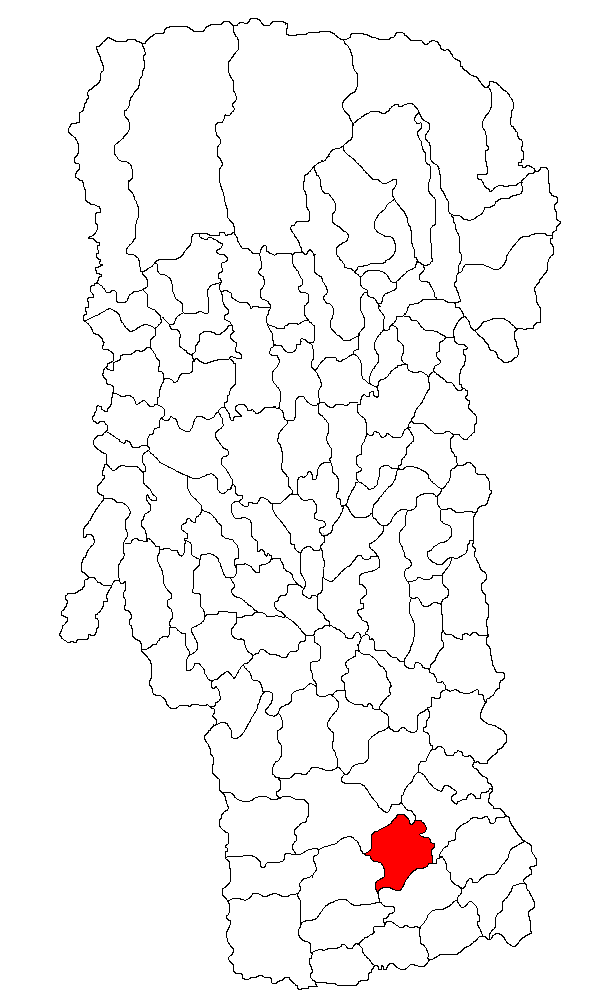
- Location in Argeș County

- Location in Romania
- Coordinates: 44°31′N 25°02′E
- Country: Romania
- County: Argeș
- Population (2021-12-01): 2,430
- Time zone: EET/EEST (UTC+2/+3)
- Vehicle reg.: AG

Recea is a commune in the south of Argeș County, Muntenia, Romania, having a population of 3,272 (2002 census). It is composed of five villages: Deagu de Jos, Deagu de Sus, Goleasca, Orodel and Recea.

It lies in the Teleorman river valley and the main source of revenue is agriculture.
