= Măgura, Teleorman =

Măgura
- Commune
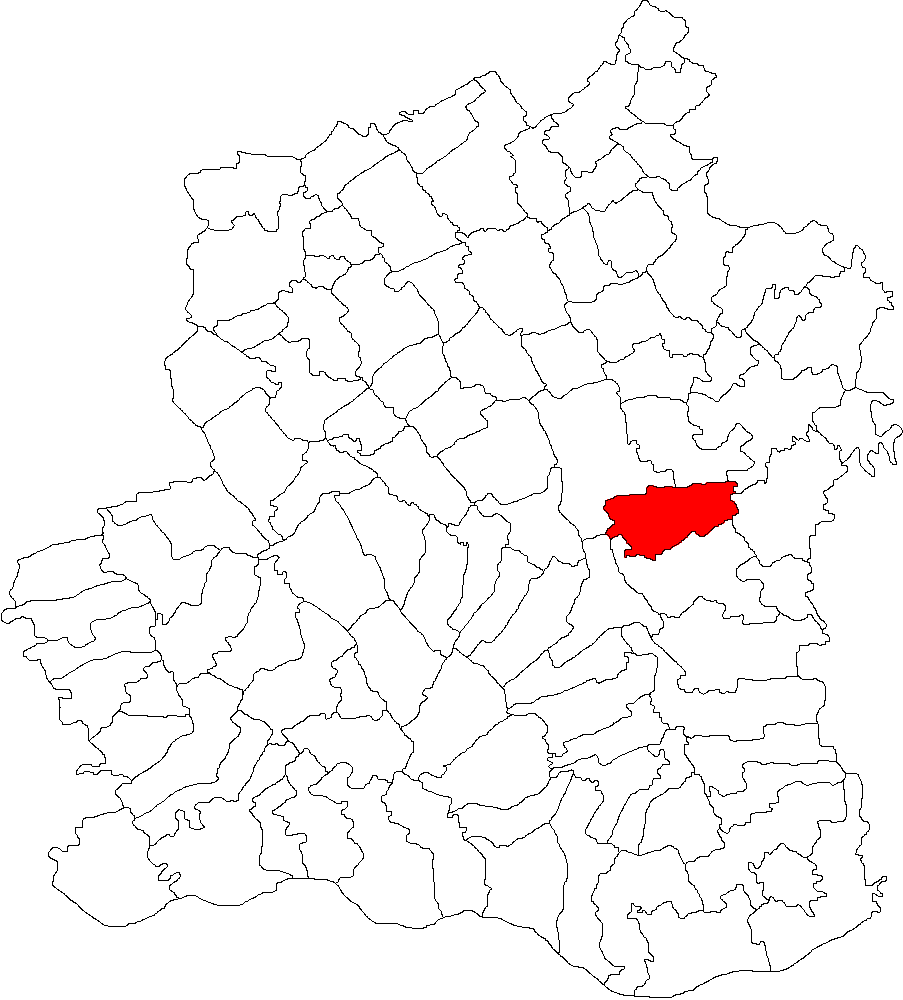
- Location in Teleorman County

- Location in Romania
- Coordinates: 44°02′N 25°24′E
- Country: Romania
- County: Teleorman
- Subdivisions: Guruieni, Măgura
- Population (2021-12-01): 2,299
- Time zone: EET/EEST (UTC+2/+3)
- Vehicle reg.: TR

Măgura (Romanian pronunciation: [ˈməɡura]) is a commune in Teleorman County, Muntenia, Romania. It is composed of two villages, Guruieni and Măgura.
