= Vitănești =

- Commune
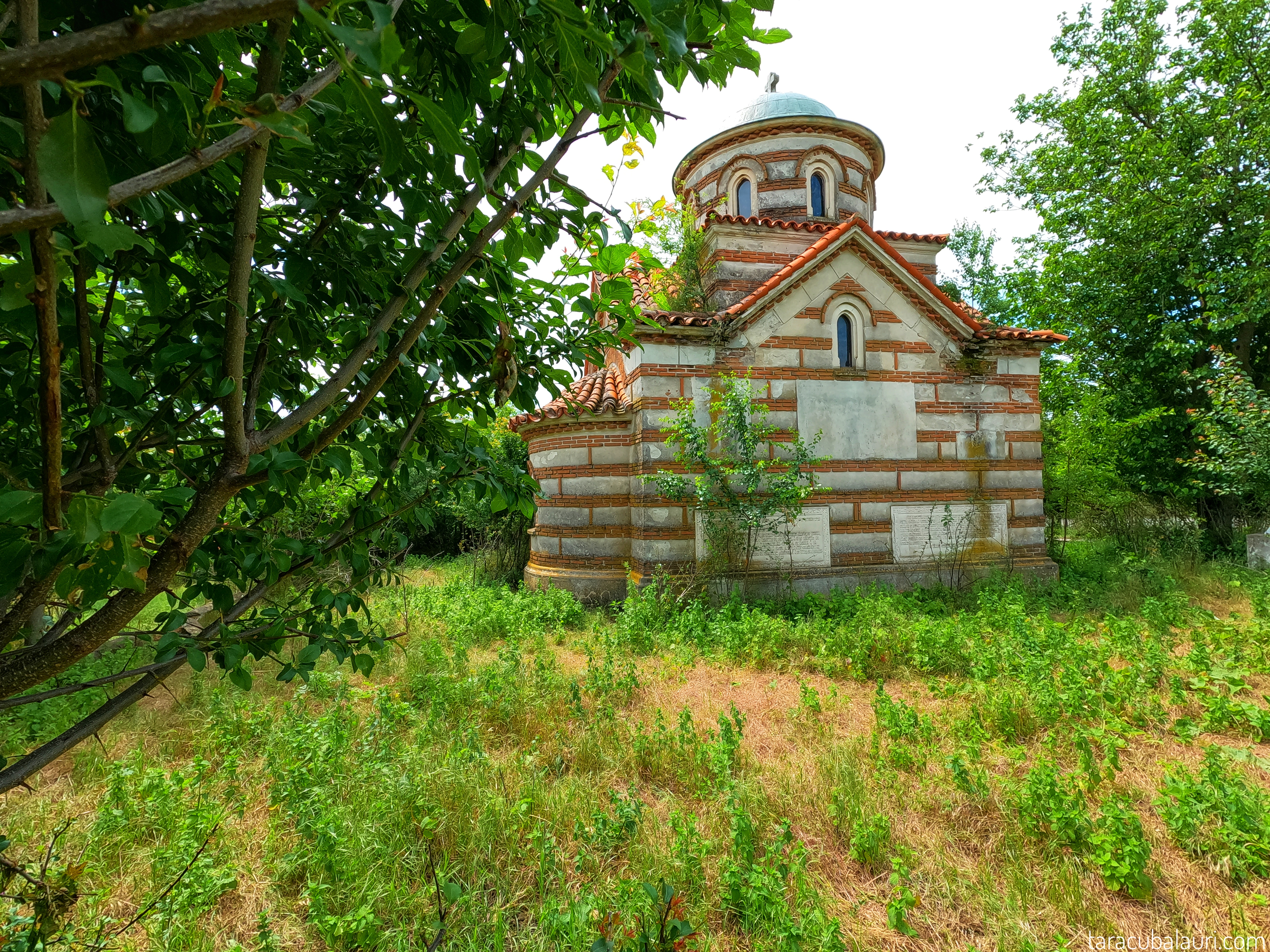
- The Victor Antonescu Chapel in Vitănești

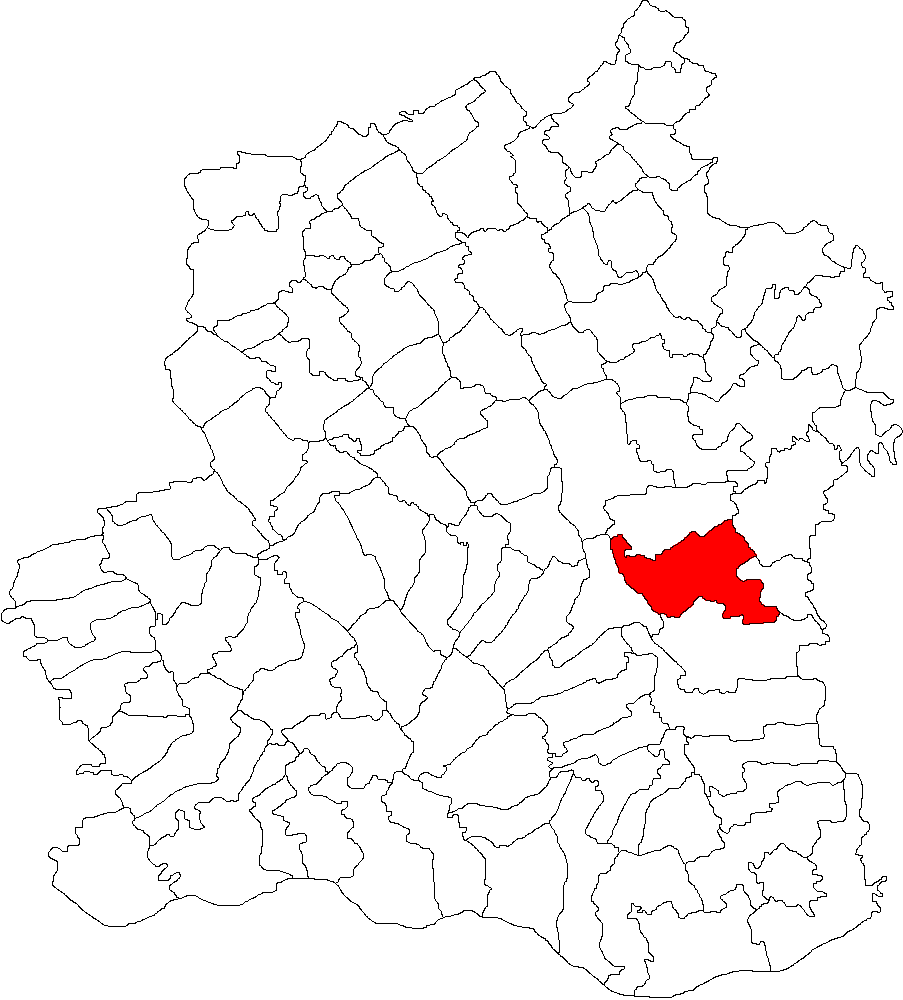
- Location in Teleorman County

- Location in Romania
- Coordinates: 44°00′N 25°25′E
- Country: Romania
- County: Teleorman
- Subdivisions: Purani, Schitu Poienari, Siliștea, Vitănești

Government
  - Mayor (2020–2024): Simion Nedea (PNL)
- Area: 72.82 km^{2} (28.12 sq mi)
- Elevation: 54 m (177 ft)
- Population (2021-12-01): 2,539
  - Density: 34.87/km^{2} (90.30/sq mi)
- Time zone: UTC+02:00 (EET)
  - Summer (DST): UTC+03:00 (EEST)
- Postal code: 147440
- Vehicle reg.: TR
- Website: primariavitanesti.ro

Vitănești (Purani until 1996) is a commune in Teleorman County, Muntenia, Romania. It is composed of four villages: Purani, Schitu Poienari, Siliștea, and Vitănești.

The commune is crossed by the 44th parallel north.

Notable residents include the philosopher and writer Constantin Noica (1909–1987).
