= Smârdioasa =

- Commune
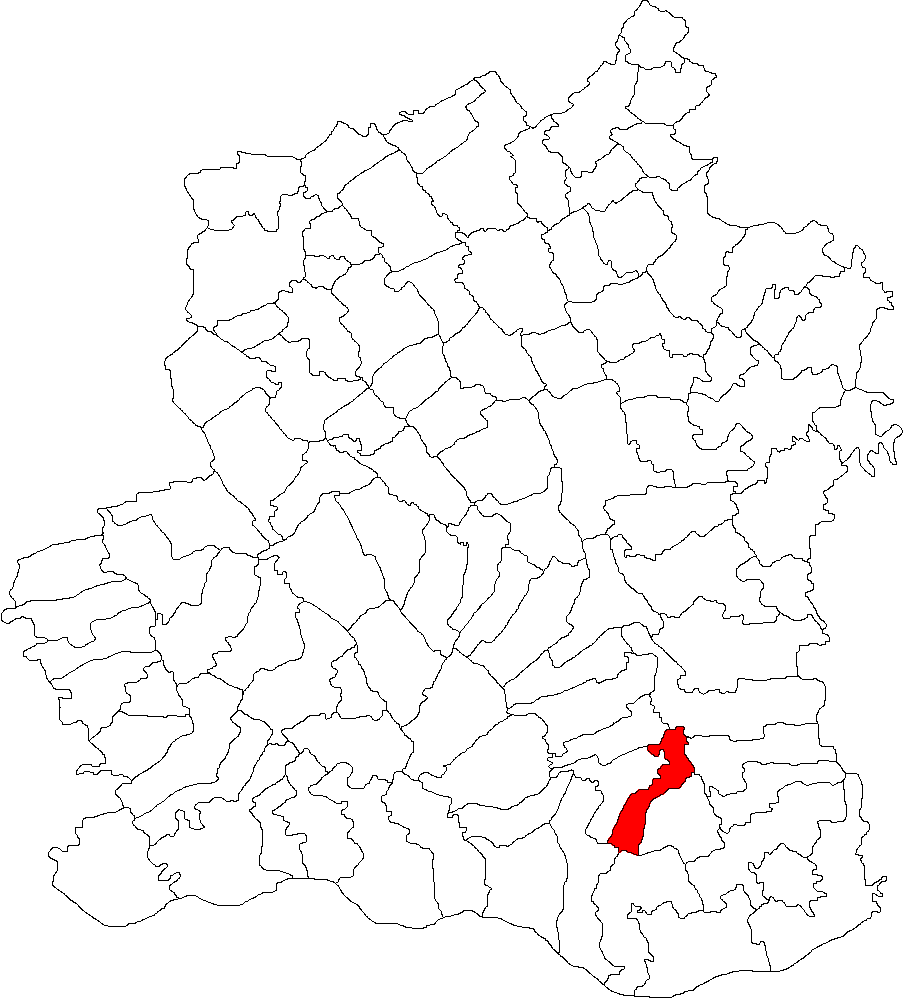
- Location in Teleorman County

- Location in Romania
- Coordinates: 43°51′N 25°26′E
- Country: Romania
- County: Teleorman
- Subdivisions: Smârdioasa, Șoimu

Government
  - Mayor (2020–2024): George Pomojnicu (PNL)
- Area: 31.68 km^{2} (12.23 sq mi)
- Elevation: 34 m (112 ft)
- Population (2021-12-01): 2,117
  - Density: 67/km^{2} (170/sq mi)
- Time zone: EET/EEST (UTC+2/+3)
- Postal code: 147360
- Area code: +(40) 247
- Vehicle reg.: TR
- Website: primariasmardioasa.ro

Smârdioasa is a commune in Teleorman County, Muntenia, Romania. It is composed of two villages, Smârdioasa and Șoimu.

Historical population
Year	Pop.	±%
1832	215	—
1912	2,555	+1088.4%
1930	3,018	+18.1%
1956	3,421	+13.4%
1977	3,415	−0.2%
1992	2,831	−17.1%
2002	2,739	−3.2%
2011	2,385	−12.9%
2021	2,117	−11.2%
Source: Census data
