= Buzoești =

- Commune
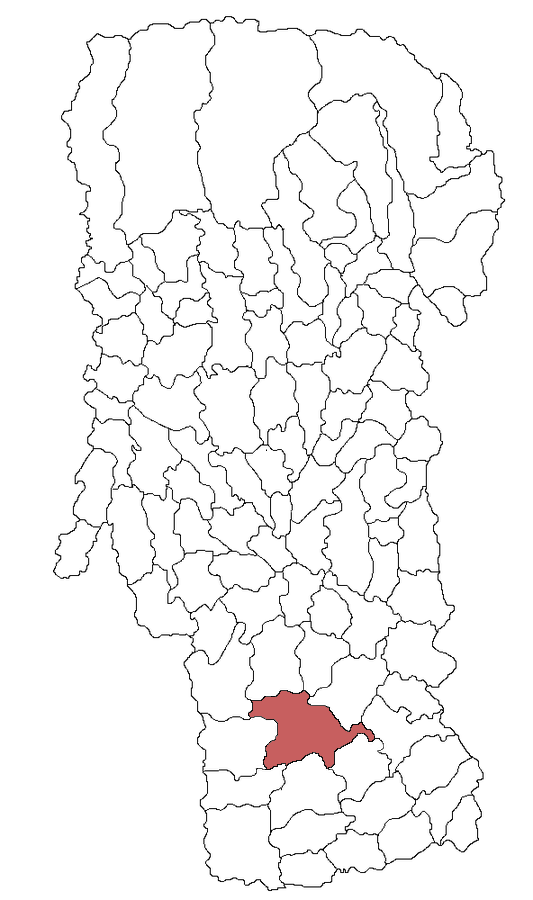
- Location in Argeș County

- Location in Romania
- Coordinates: 44°35′N 24°55′E
- Country: Romania
- County: Argeș

Government
  - Mayor (2020–2024): Ion Tănase (PNL)
- Area: 160.27 km^{2} (61.88 sq mi)
- Elevation: 194 m (636 ft)
- Population (2021-12-01): 5,056
  - Density: 31.55/km^{2} (81.71/sq mi)
- Time zone: UTC+02:00 (EET)
  - Summer (DST): UTC+03:00 (EEST)
- Postal code: 117182
- Area code: (+40) 0248
- Vehicle reg.: AG
- Website: primariabuzoesti.ro

Buzoești is a commune in Argeș County, Muntenia, Romania. It is composed of eleven villages: Bujoreni, Buzoești, Cornățel, Curteanca, Ionești, Podeni, Redea, Șerboeni, Tomșanca, Vlăduța, and Vulpești (the commune centre).

Historical population
Year	Pop.	±%
2002	6,306	—
2011	5,975	−5.2%
2021	5,056	−15.4%
Source: Census data

== Natives ==
- Ionuț Badea (born 1975), football manager and former player
