= Scurtu Mare =

- Commune
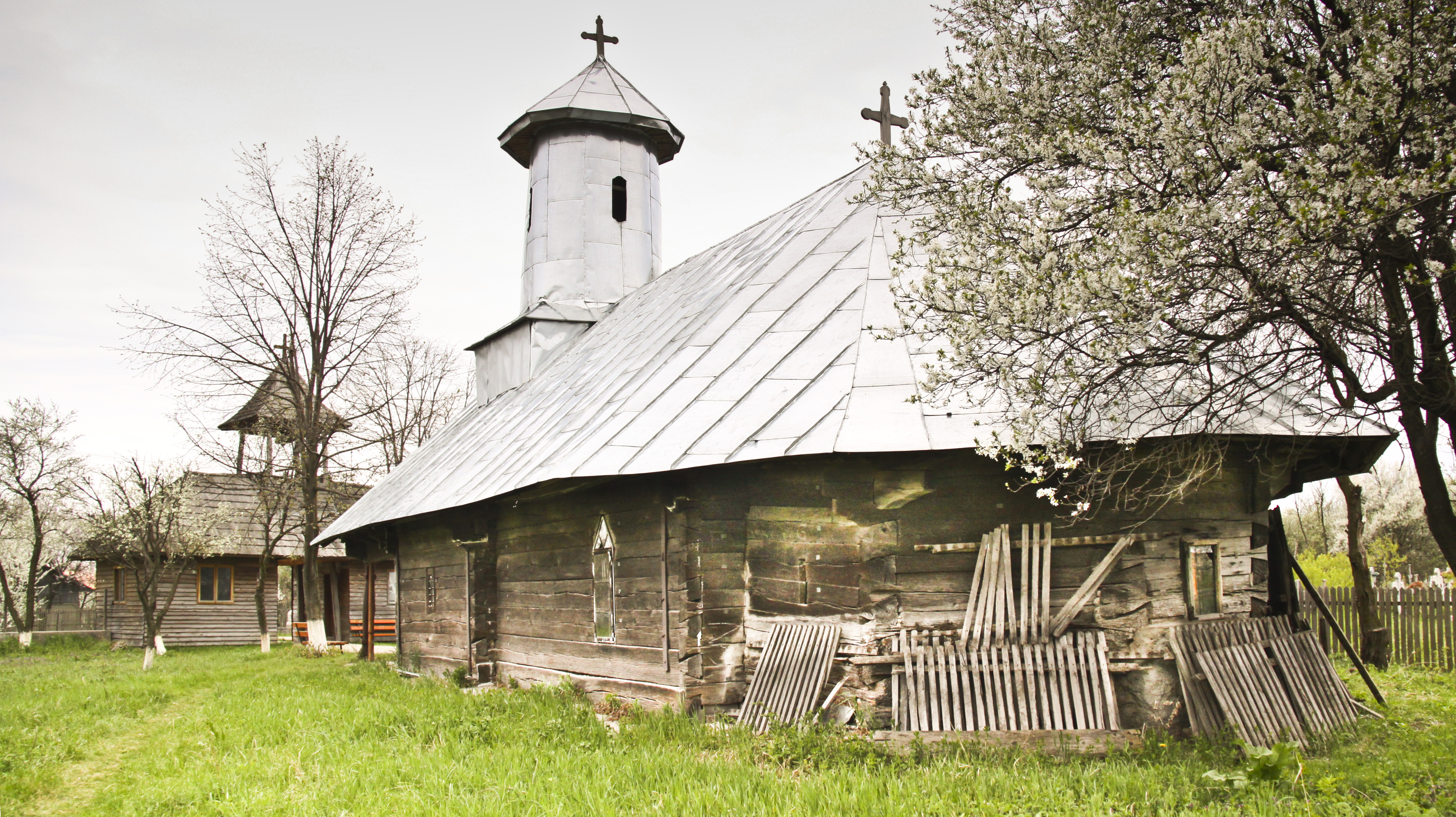
- Wooden church in Drăcești

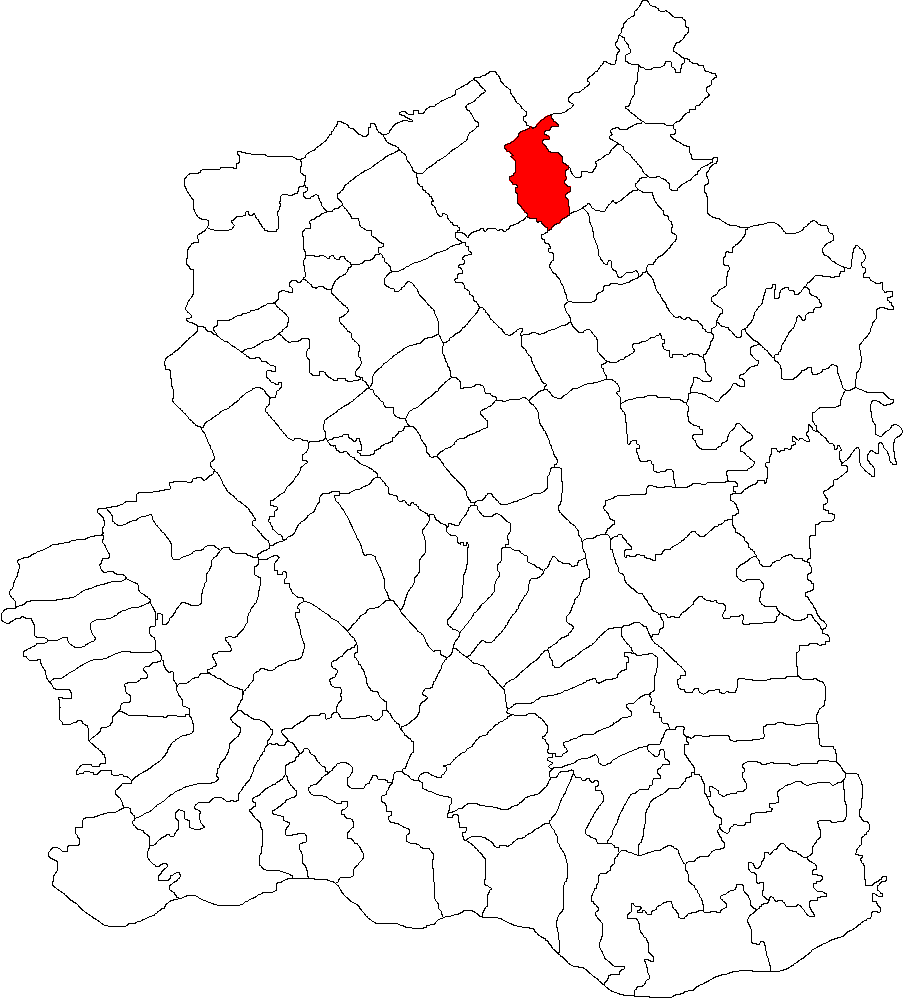
- Location in Teleorman County

- Location in Romania
- Coordinates: 44°21′N 25°16′E
- Country: Romania
- County: Teleorman
- Subdivisions: Albeni, Drăcești, Negrilești, Scurtu Mare, Scurtu-Slăvești, Valea Poștei
- Population (2021-12-01): 1,395
- Time zone: UTC+02:00 (EET)
  - Summer (DST): UTC+03:00 (EEST)
- Vehicle reg.: TR

Scurtu Mare is a commune in Teleorman County, Muntenia, Romania. It is composed of six villages: Albeni, Drăcești, Negrilești, Scurtu Mare, Scurtu-Slăvești and Valea Poștei.
