= Costești =

- Town
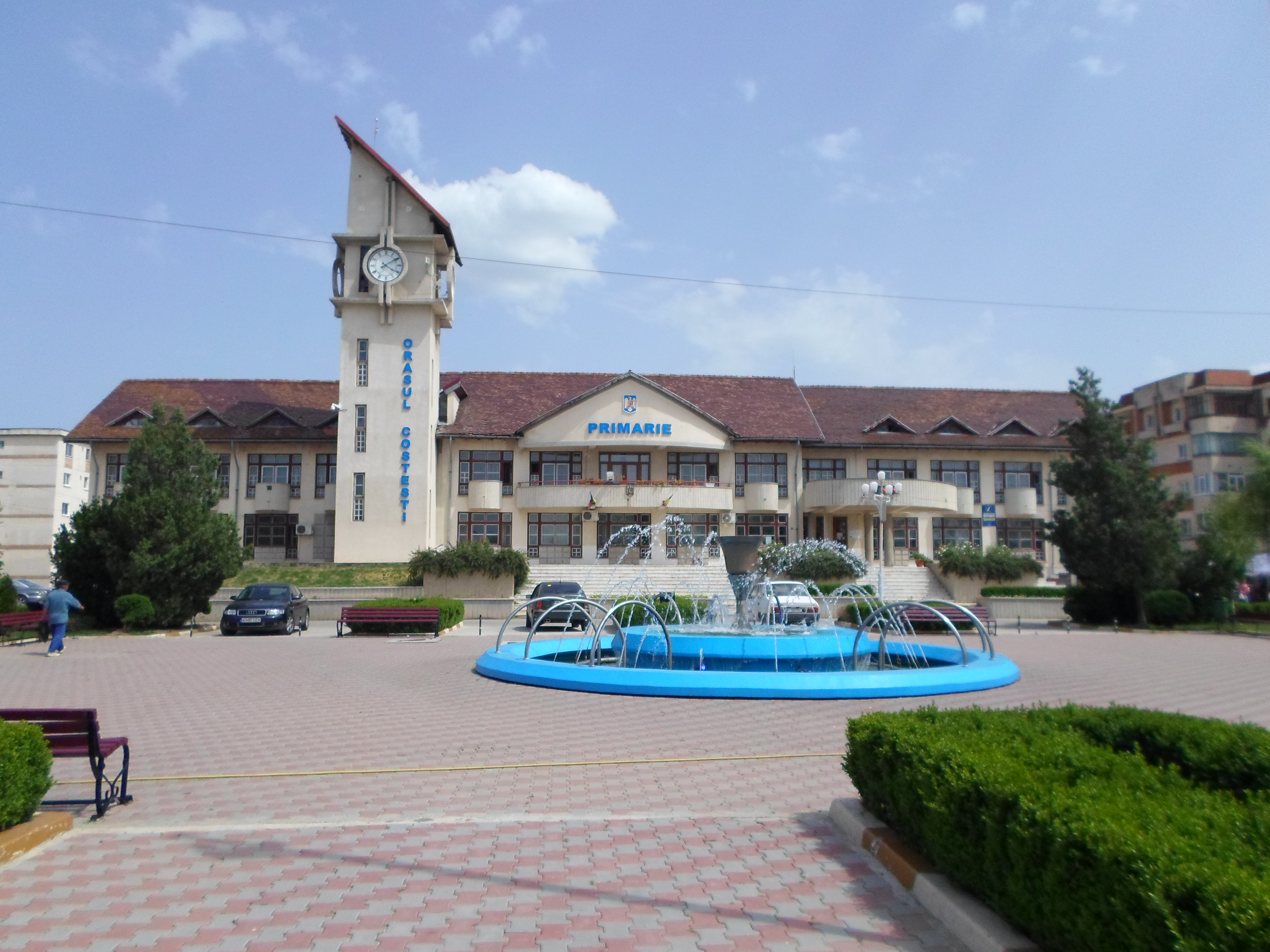
- City Hall

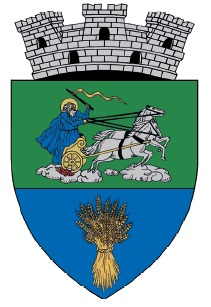
- Coat of arms

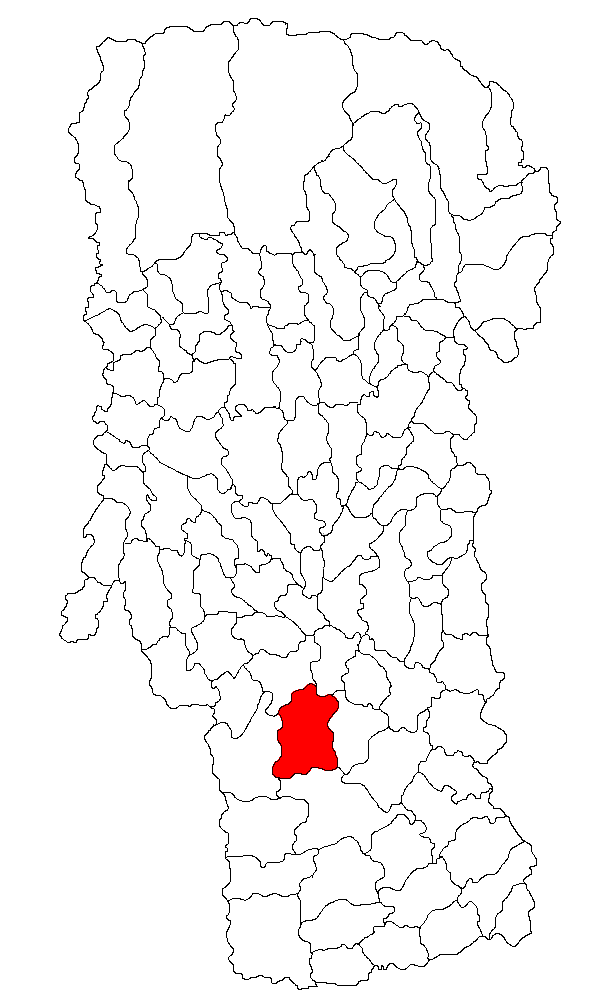
- Location in Argeș County

- Location in Romania
- Coordinates: 44°40′11″N 24°52′48″E
- Country: Romania
- County: Argeș

Government
  - Mayor (2024–2028): Ion Baicea (PSD)
- Area: 108.64 km^{2} (41.95 sq mi)
- Elevation: 224 m (735 ft)
- Population (2021-12-01): 9,460
  - Density: 87.1/km^{2} (226/sq mi)
- Time zone: UTC+02:00 (EET)
  - Summer (DST): UTC+03:00 (EEST)
- Postal code: 115200
- Area code: (+40) 0248
- Vehicle reg.: AG
- Website: primariacostestiag.ro

Historical population
Year	Pop.	±%
1977	10,471	—
1992	12,040	+15.0%
2002	12,091	+0.4%
2011	10,058	−16.8%
2021	9,460	−5.9%
Source: Census data

Costești (Romanian pronunciation: [kosˈteʃtʲ]) is a town in Argeș County, Muntenia, Romania. The population as of 2021 was 9,460. The town administers six villages: Broșteni, Lăceni, Pârvu Roșu, Podu Broșteni, Smei, and Stârci.

The 1930 Costești wooden church fire took place here.
