= Mârzănești =

- Commune
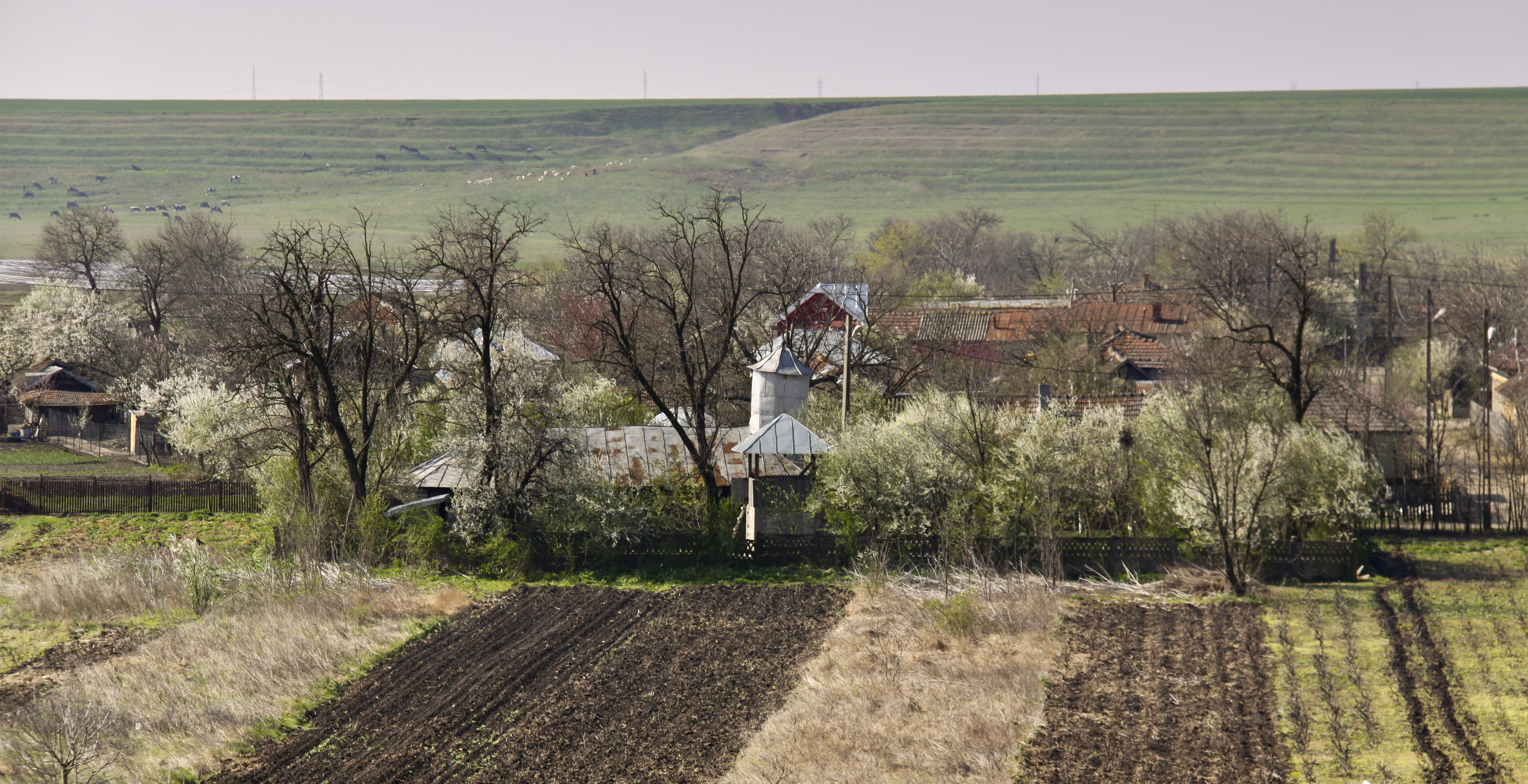
- Teleormanu village

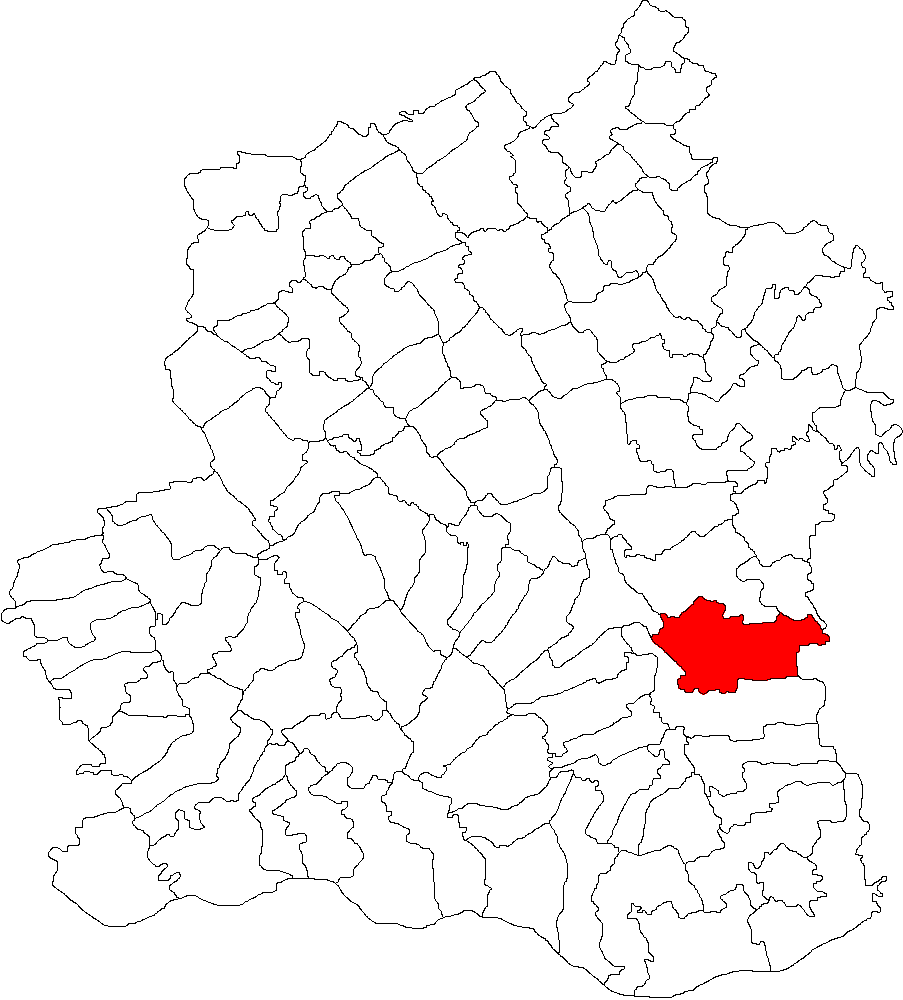
- Location in Teleorman County

- Location in Romania
- Coordinates: 43°56′N 25°28′E
- Country: Romania
- County: Teleorman
- Subdivisions: Cernetu, Mârzănești, Teleormanu, Valea Părului

Government
  - Mayor (2020–2024): Viorel Mihăilă (PNL)
- Area: 88.2 km^{2} (34.1 sq mi)
- Elevation: 65 m (213 ft)
- Population (2021-12-01): 3,200
  - Density: 36/km^{2} (94/sq mi)
- Time zone: UTC+02:00 (EET)
  - Summer (DST): UTC+03:00 (EEST)
- Postal code: 147202
- Area code: +40 x47
- Vehicle reg.: TR
- Website: primarimarzanesti.ro

Mârzănești is a commune in Teleorman County, Muntenia, Romania. It is composed of four villages: Cernetu, Mârzănești, Teleormanu, and Valea Părului.

== Natives ==
- Stan Ghițescu (1881–1952), politician
- Basarab Panduru (born 1970), football forward and manager
- Florea Voicilă (born 1954), football forward and manager
