= Vălărița =

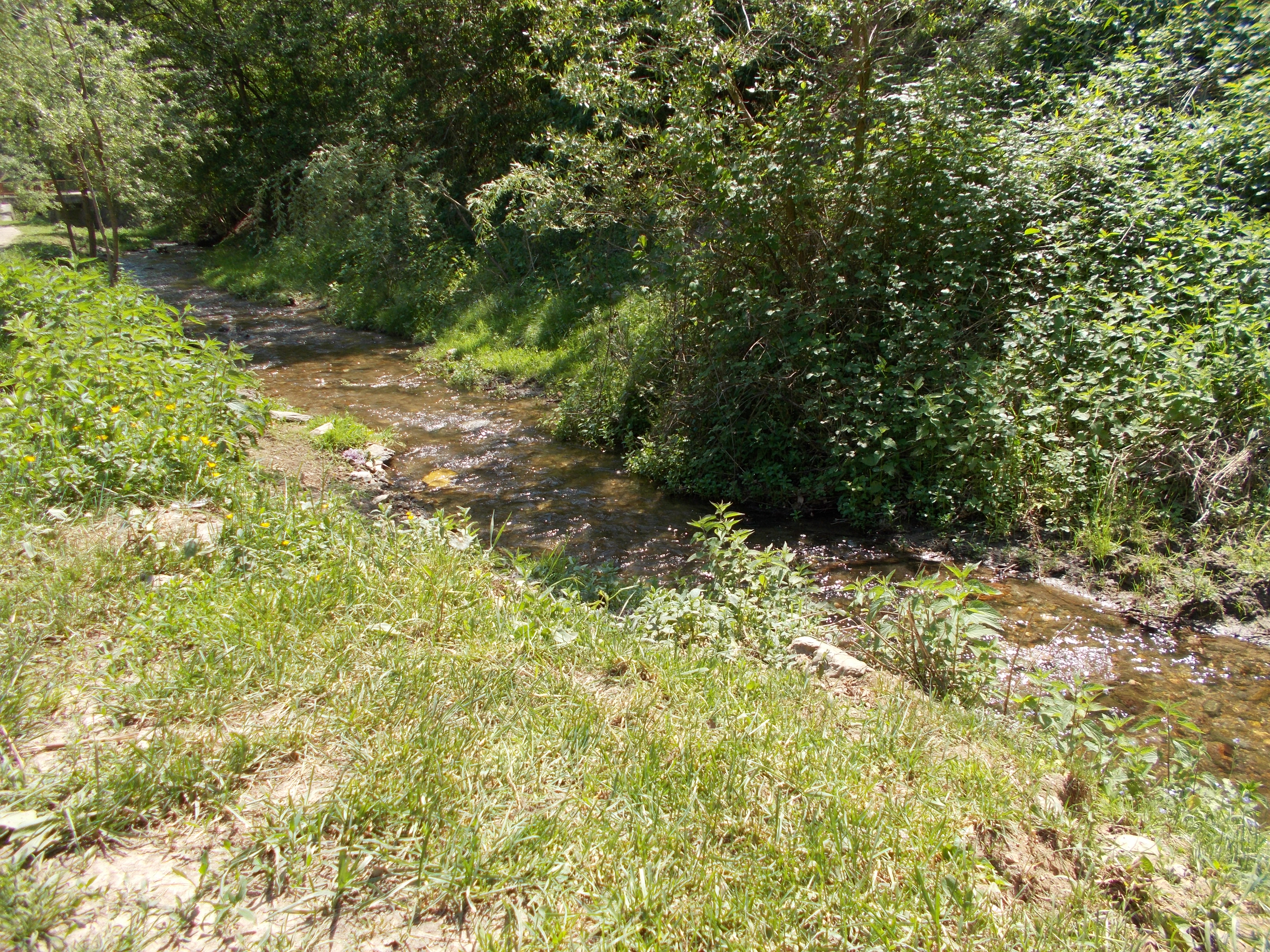

- Location within Romania

Location
- Country: Romania
- Counties: Hunedoara County
- Villages: Cernișoara Florese, Vălari

Physical characteristics
- Mouth: Cerna
  - location: Toplița
  - coordinates: 45.6850°N 22.7819°E
- Length: 15 km (9.3 mi)
- Basin size: 31 km^{2} (12 sq mi)

Basin features
- Progression: Cerna→ Mureș→ Tisza→ Danube→ Black Sea

The Vălărița is a left tributary of the river Cerna in Romania. It flows into the Cerna in Toplița. Its length is 15 km (9.3 mi) and its basin size is 31 km^{2} (12 sq mi).
