= Hunedoara steel works =

Steel mill in Hunedoara, Romania

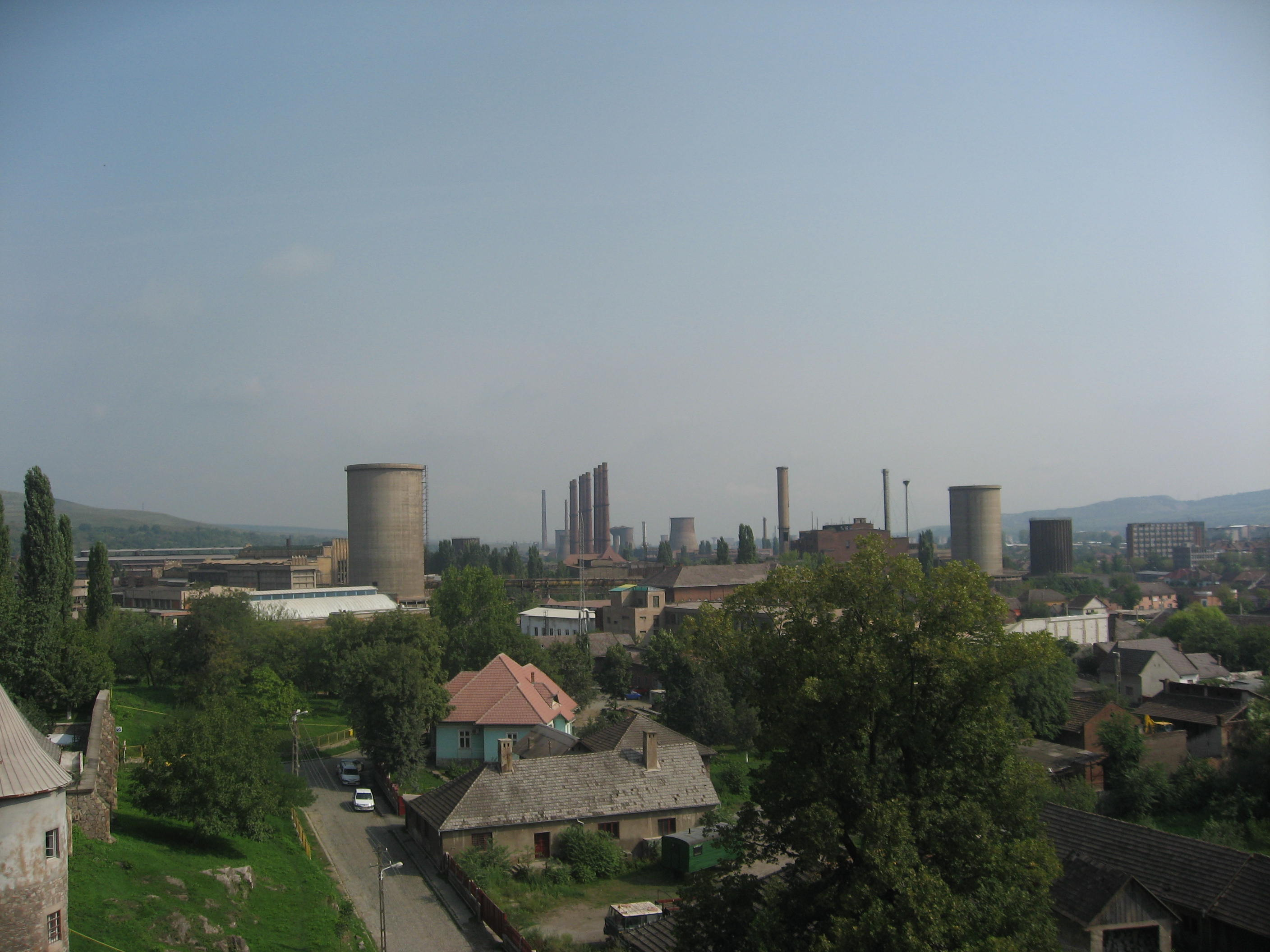
- Built: June 1884; 142 years ago
- Location: Hunedoara, Romania
- Industry: Steel
- Owner: UMB Grup

The Hunedoara steel works, formerly known as ArcelorMittal Hunedoara, the Hunedoara Ironworks (Romanian: Uzinele de Fier Hunedoara), Hunedoara Steel Works (Combinatul Siderurgic Hunedoara), and Siderurgica Hunedoara is a steel mill in Hunedoara, Transylvania, Romania.

== History ==
=== Beginnings in Austria-Hungary ===
Several factors led to the establishment of the works, which were located in an area that was then part of Austria-Hungary: late 19th-century technological development that resulted in increased steel production through new techniques, spurred by the serious need of metal for the Austro-Hungarian Army; the aged and unprofitable methods used by the area's iron workshops; the building of a railroad; and the enlargement of the market due to increased metal consumption in Transylvania's mechanical plants. Building started in August 1882, with two blast furnaces 14.40 m (47.2 ft) high and 110 m^{3} (3,900 cu ft) in volume. The third furnace, with a capacity of 40–50 tons per day, started to be built in 1884; the fourth was started in 1885 and could produce 10–150 tons a day; and the fifth, which could generate 80–150 tons a day, in 1903. The first three burned charcoal, while the last two ran on coke.

Iron ore was extracted from the mine near the Ghelari plant some 16 km away, and was brought there on a ropeway conveyor built at the same time as the first furnace. Increased production of cast iron had led to a greater demand for iron ore, which in turn caused intense extraction of deep deposits in the Poiana Ruscă Mountains. Industrial-scale quarrying began at Ghelari in 1863, followed by shaft mining from 1881. As the ropeway conveyor could no longer handle a significantly enlarged capacity, the 16-km Ghelari-Hunedoara narrow gauge railway was built between 1890 and 1900. Also in the same area were built the 18-km Govăjdia–Bătrâna River funicular for charcoal transport and the 14-km Govăjdia-Bunila one for bringing charcoal and limestone. The latter was also supplied from local quarries and carried in by harnessed pack animals.

The works were officially opened on June 12, 1884. The following May, the second blast furnace went into operation, and it was in the years after that Hunedoara became the area's steel-producing center. The factory administration moved there, and the old iron, forging and machine workshops gradually lost their importance, although the Govăjdia Blast Furnace remained active as late as 1918. In 1886, the practice of turning cast iron into steel began at Hunedoara, using new technologies. The cast iron was shipped to steel works at Cugir, Podbrezová, and Diósgyőr, but the technical and economic results were unsatisfactory. Experiments within the Hunedoara works had failed due to deficiencies in the craftsmanship of the improvised equipment, and this was purpose-rebuilt in 1887. However, once they started operating again, a fire destroyed them, after which the 1887 cast iron moulding hall and the experimental Bessemer converter were rebuilt, operating for six months.

The opening of the third furnace in June 1890 led to a renewed decision to start producing steel; this happened in 1892 after two 12-ton Martin open hearth furnaces and two Bessemer converters were installed. A fourth furnace, 288 m^{3} (10,200 cu ft) in volume and 3.3 m (11 ft) higher than the others, started production in August 1895, reaching its planned capacity of 109 tons per day within a month.

=== Interwar period ===
Transylvania united with Romania in 1918, with the works passing into the ownership of the Romanian government the following year. After 1920, they were now known as the Hunedoara Ironworks (Uzinele de Fier Hunedoara; UFH) and continued as a mining and steel-making center, with considerable holdings of raw materials and output capacity: iron ore mines at Ghelari, Arănieş and Vadu Dobrii; mining concessions at Lunca Cernii de Jos, Alun, Sălciua de Jos, Trascău, Runc, and one near Odorheiu Secuiesc; five tall furnaces producing 119,000 tons a year; a workshop for moulding cast iron pieces with a 1,500 ton-a-year capacity; a forge equipped with two steam hammers; a machine workshop for preparing 500–600 tons per year of moulded or forged pieces; a cinder block workshop putting out up to 1,200,000 bricks each year; a limestone quarry at Bunila; a number of coal depots manufacturing charcoal for the furnaces; a tall blast furnace at Govăjdia equipped with a cast iron mould and a Martin furnace; a 400-hp hydropower plant; a funicular network for carrying materials; a mill; and workshops for agricultural and other types of tools.

Starting in 1926, engineers and economists insisted, through proposals they made and carried out, on increased output up to the maximum level. For instance, one plan from that year, by the head mine inspector of the Jiu Valley, called for high growth to be achieved both by using the plant to its fullest capacity; and by refining cast iron to a higher degree, first into steel and then into laminated products, by using upgraded equipment.

Between 1937 and 1940, a modern steel production and rolling section was built, with machinery imported from Nazi Germany, covering 8,500 m^{2} (91,000 sq ft) and fitted with four special components. First, the four Siemens-Martin open-hearth furnaces, heated by six gas generators, could each fit 25 loads of tons, with a total capacity of 90,000 tons of steel ingots per year. The alloy loaded into the furnaces was 75% cast iron and 25% scrap iron, and the hall where they were located was fitted with a mixer for 200 tons of liquid cast iron, to be used during production. Second, the 5 ton-per-load electric furnace produced special steels for tools, including alloys of chromium and tungsten, up to 6,000 tons a year. Later, this was modernized and moved to the foundry. Third, the foundry room with pits for shaping steel into ingots. Fourth, seven sliding bridges: two 50-ton ones; one 3-ton one; one 7.5-ton bridge fitted with electromagnets; two 7.5.-ton cantilever bridges; and one featuring a gripping mechanism for transporting finished ingots.

=== Communist era ===
By 1957, Hunedoara had more than 36,000 residents and was coming to be seen as a factory town, an image that would endure through 1999. The plant, known during this period as the Hunedoara Steel Works (Combinatul Siderurgic Hunedoara; CSH), employed workers from surrounding villages as well as peasants from Moldavia and Muntenia driven to settle in the city as part of the forced industrialization drive of the decade-old Communist regime. They spurred the city's growth from 4800 residents in 1930 to almost 90,000 in 1990, making it the country's largest city dependent on a single industry. Unlike other Romanian cities that were just starting to industrialize with the beginning of Nicolae Ceaușescu's rule in 1965, the process was completed earlier in Hunedoara, which by the 1960s already had the sense of a unified community, and by 1970 had reached the height of its urban and industrial development. Production reached its peak in 1982–84, stalling during the regime's last years.

Hunedoara was the leading Romanian producer of long steel profiles, made in two electric arc furnaces. The first, with a capacity of 150,000 tons per year, two 50-ton furnaces and two 20-ton ones for alloyed steels shaped into ingots, featured vacuum degasification and electro-slag remelting. The second, turning out up to 400,000 tons a year, had two 100-ton secondary treatment furnaces with a continuous turning mechanism and eccentric bottom tap-holes. There were also two open hearth furnace steel mills. The first had five 100-ton ovens with an annual capacity of 300,000 tons a year, and a rolling mill for up to 450,000 tons of light profiles a year, used for making special products. The second Siemens-Martin steel mill had a production capacity of some 3.2 million tons per year and a rolling plant for light profiles (440,000 tons a year), heavy profiles (1,130,000 tons a year) and wire (280,000 tons a year). Stainless steel for bearings was also produced.

=== Evolution after 1990 ===
==== Privatization and aftermath ====
The Communist regime fell in 1989 with the Romanian Revolution, and the transition to a market economy found the works ill-equipped to survive, with their technology not having been upgraded since the late 1970s.

In 1991, the works became a state-owned joint-stock company, Siderurgica Hunedoara. The following year, steel plant #1, with a capacity of some 330,000 tons of steel a year, was shut down, as well as three furnaces at steel plant #2. In mid-1999, steel plant #2 was gradually shut down: first sintering was halted, then coking and finally on June 12, 115 years to the day after the works were inaugurated, the cast iron-producing furnaces. A further shutdown occurred in the spring of 2003, and some 5,300 workers were laid off. The company was renamed Mittal Steel Hunedoara in September 2003 as part of a privatization program completed the following April, when it was acquired from the Romanian government by a subsidiary of Mittal Steel Company. It took on the name of ArcelorMittal Hunedoara in 2006, following the acquisition of Arcelor by Mittal, which formed ArcelorMittal.

==== Production ====
After the fall of communism, production and employment fell by a factor of ten.

As of 2007, the works produced billets for pipes; heavy, medium and light profiles; reinforced concrete; wire; and special profiles, including mine gallery supports. Later on, the focus was defined as remaining on steel products and long hot-rolled bars. In 2011, there were plans for the installation of a new rolling machine producing up to 400,000 tons of europrofile cylinder locks a year, starting in 2012.

==== Employment ====
The drastic production reduction was followed by a surge in unemployment—from 20,000 workers in 1993, only less than 700 were counted in 2011-because while some younger workers emigrated, the majority stayed in the city and by 2011 faced serious difficulties in finding new work or took early retirement.

In 2008, the number of employees had fallen to 1,260, following a wave of compensated early retirements. For several months at the end of that year and into the next, the works entirely stopped production for the first time in 80 years: most of its output went abroad, due to a drop in orders during the Great Recession. By 2011, there were 820 employees. That year, eight exhaust chimneys, each over 90 m (300 ft) high and built in 1957, were demolished. These had become a symbol of the city, each of the ovens they served producing 400 tons of steel in one charge prior to 1990, but had become degraded. The chimney of blast furnace #4, itself demolished in 2004, remains standing. In the two years preceding this demolition, around 70% of the disused buildings were taken down, including a 1950s power plant that took seven years of attempts to destroy and was considered cursed.

As of 2010, hundreds of individuals were making a living by carting off and selling iron and copper from disused portions of the works.

==== Sale to UMB Grup ====
In September 2025, ArcelorMittal announced the closure of the mill due to high energy costs and reduced orders, affecting 477 jobs. The mill was sold to UMB Grup in April 2026 for €12.5 million plus VAT.

== The plant ==
=== Pollution ===
Metallurgical activity caused substantial air, water and soil pollution in Hunedoara, especially before 1990. Close to 140 ha (350 acres) of industrial land that is now city property remains contaminated. Since 2004, exhaust has been filtered and waste water has been treated.

== Heritage preservation ==
The plant's administrative headquarters, which functioned as a school for workers prior to the Communist era, is considered a historic building, but once abandoned in the years after 1990, it entered a state of disrepair. Its stairs, cables, floors and furniture were stolen and sold by local Roma, its interior, sheltering stray dogs, strewn with documents and remaining furniture wrecked by those searching for valuables within, the attic ravaged and housing bats, the basement covered with crates and hundreds of gas masks once used by Patriotic Guards to protect themselves from the pollution of the plant.

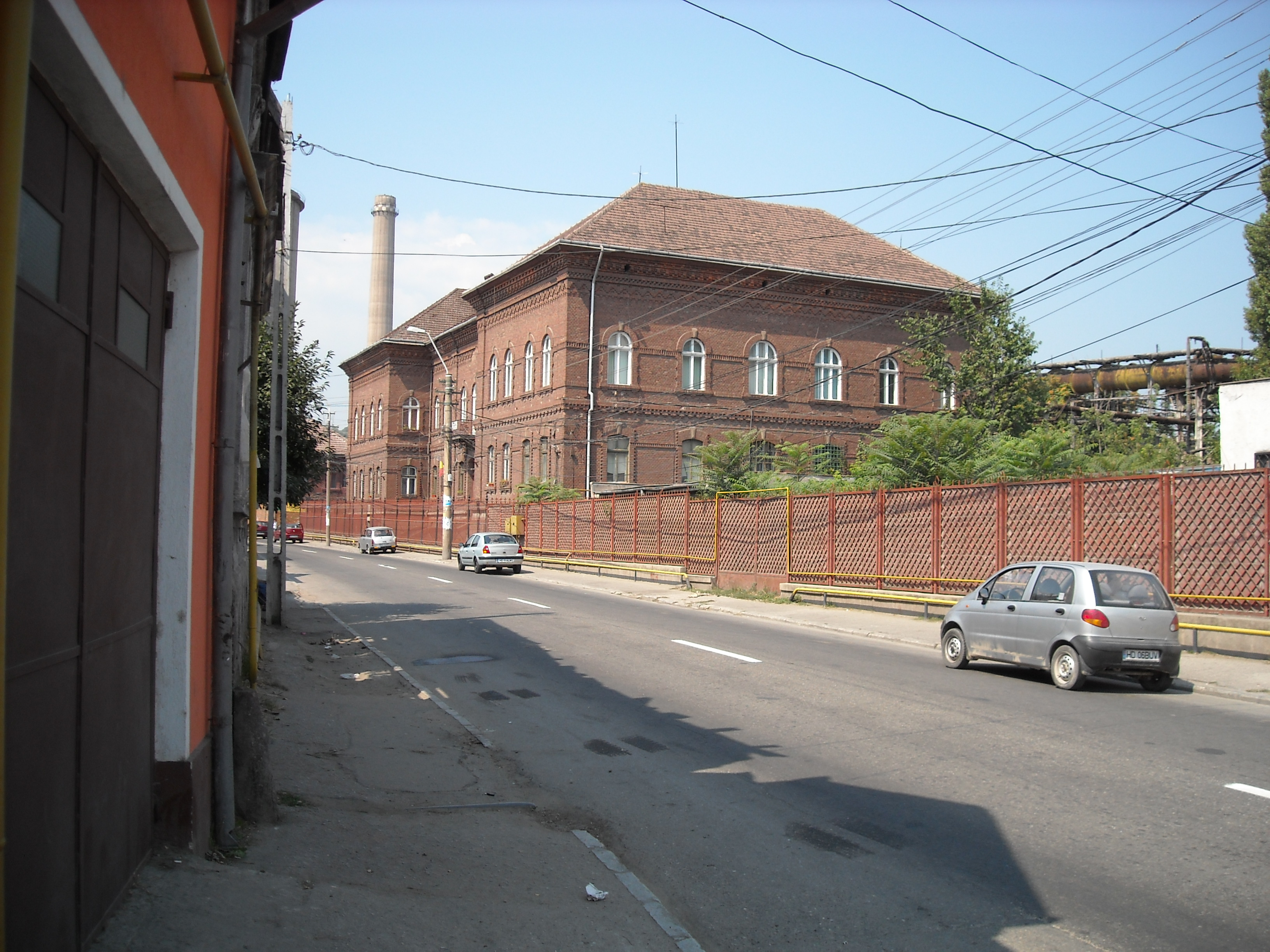
Administration building

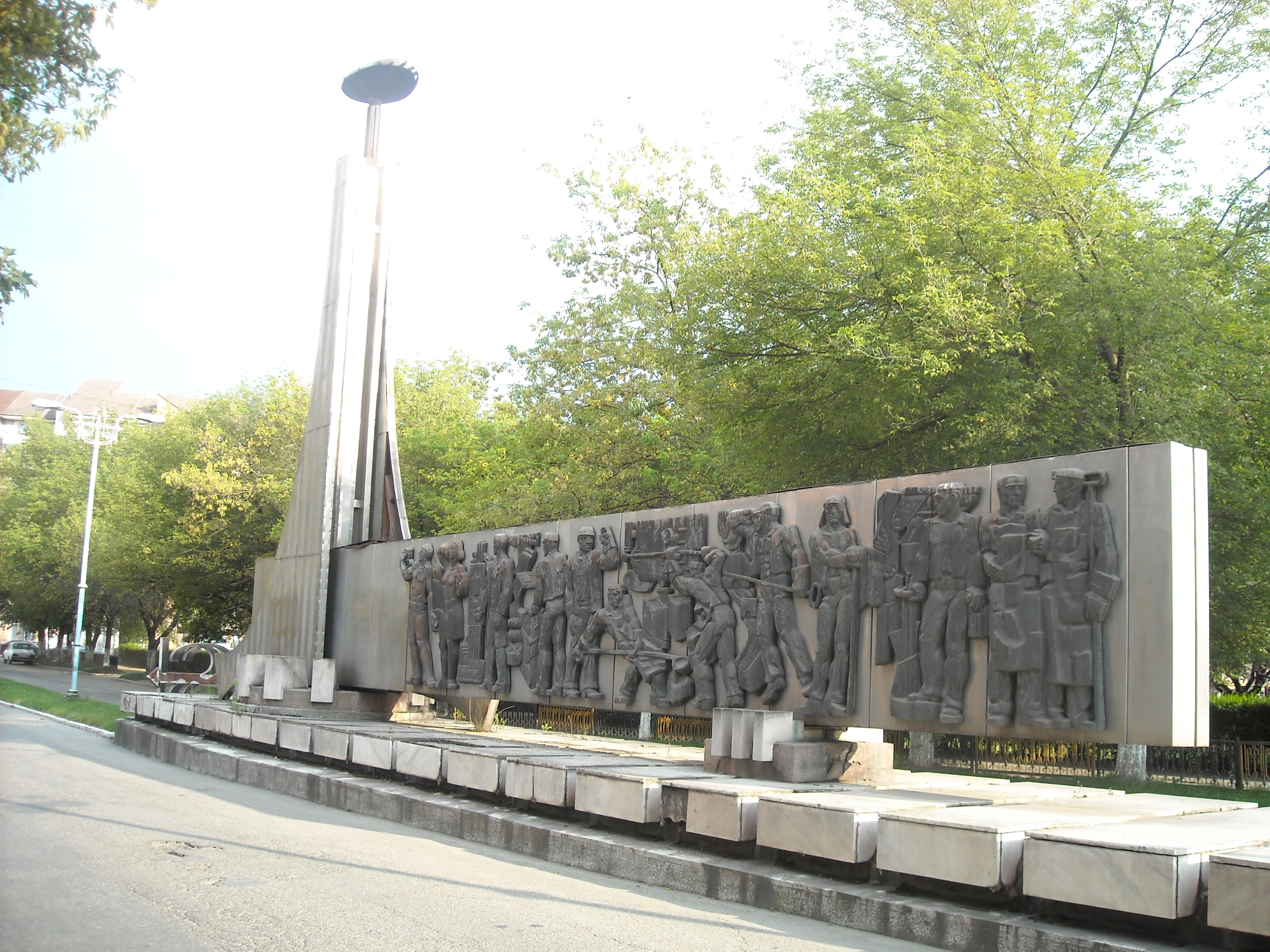
Metalworkers' monument

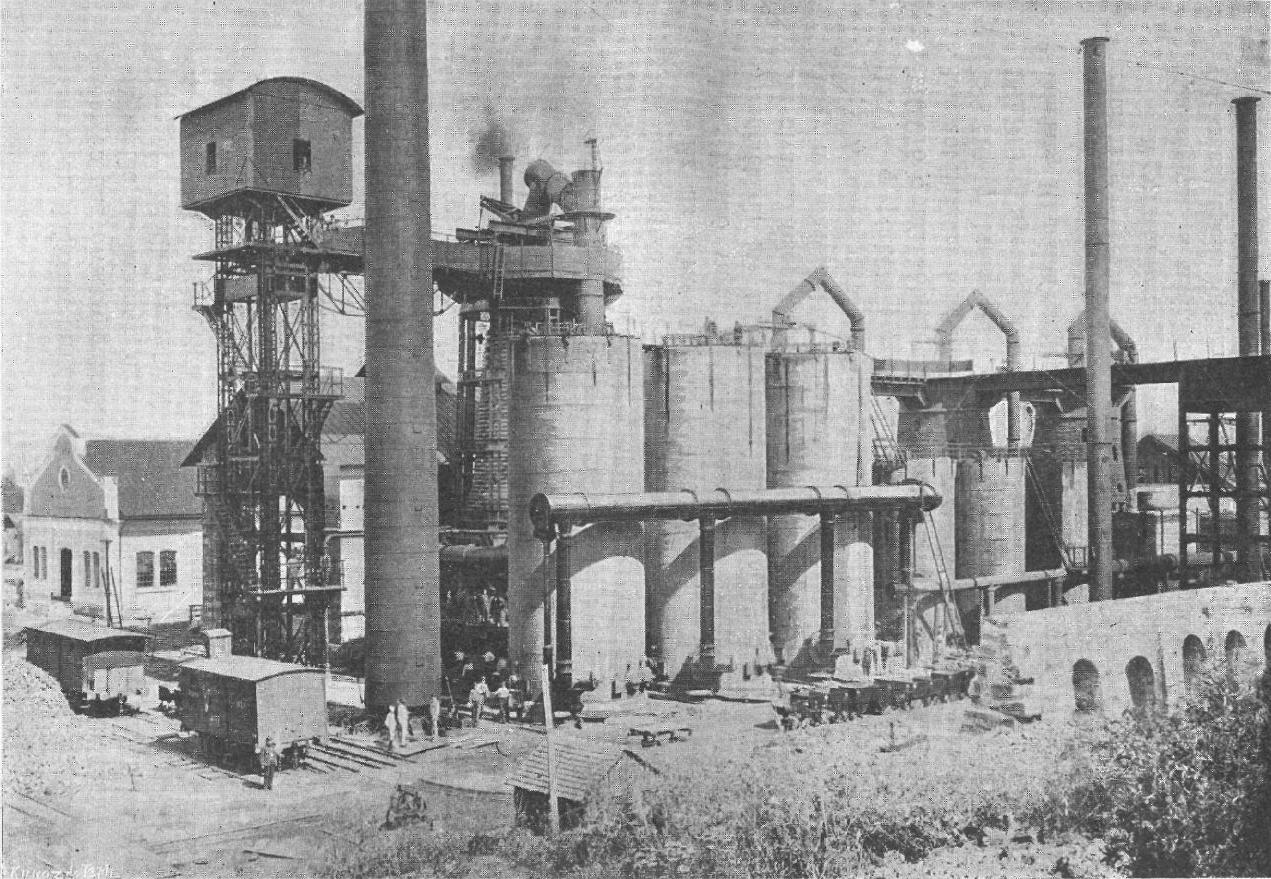
The works in 1896

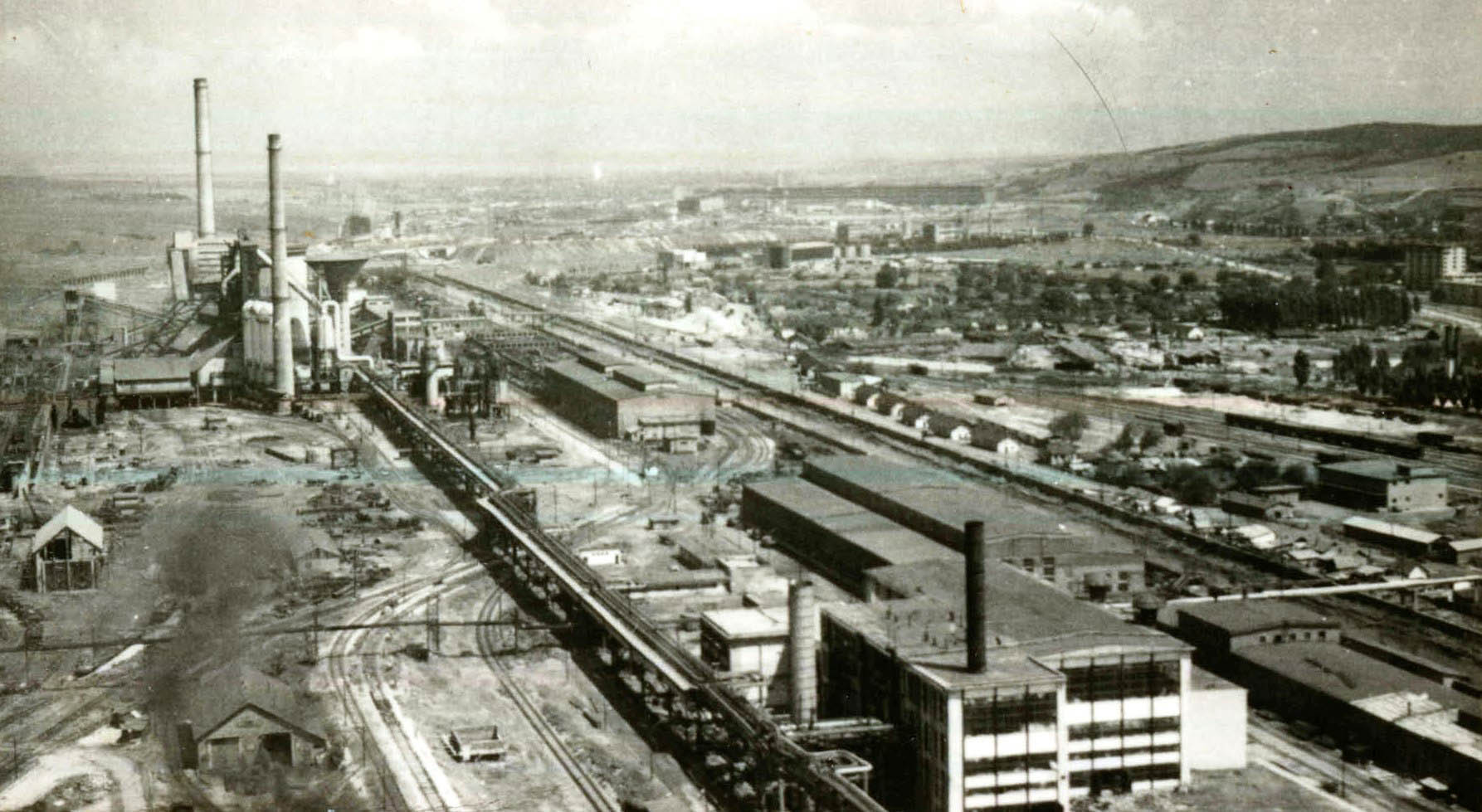
In 1970, exterior

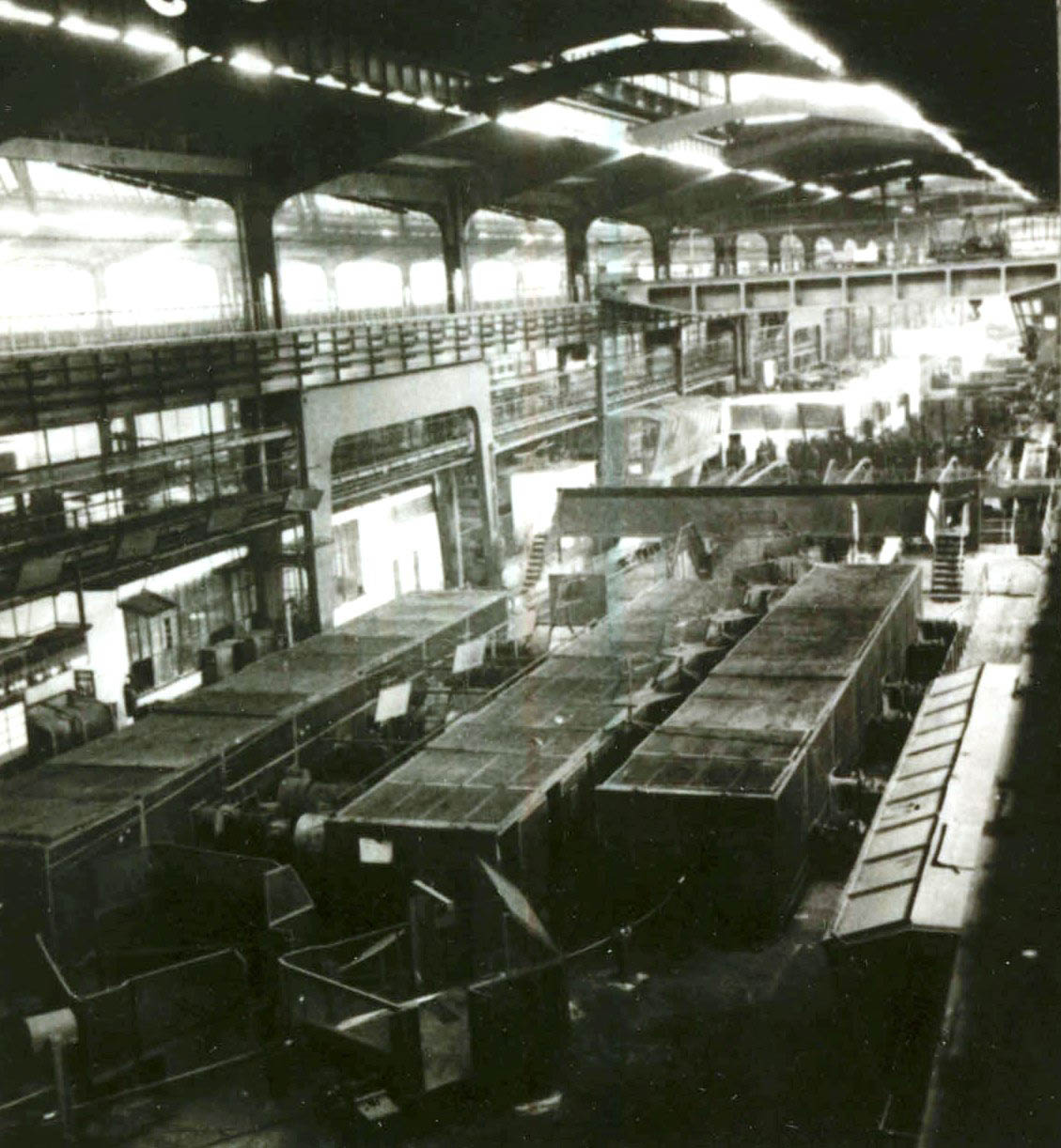
Interior

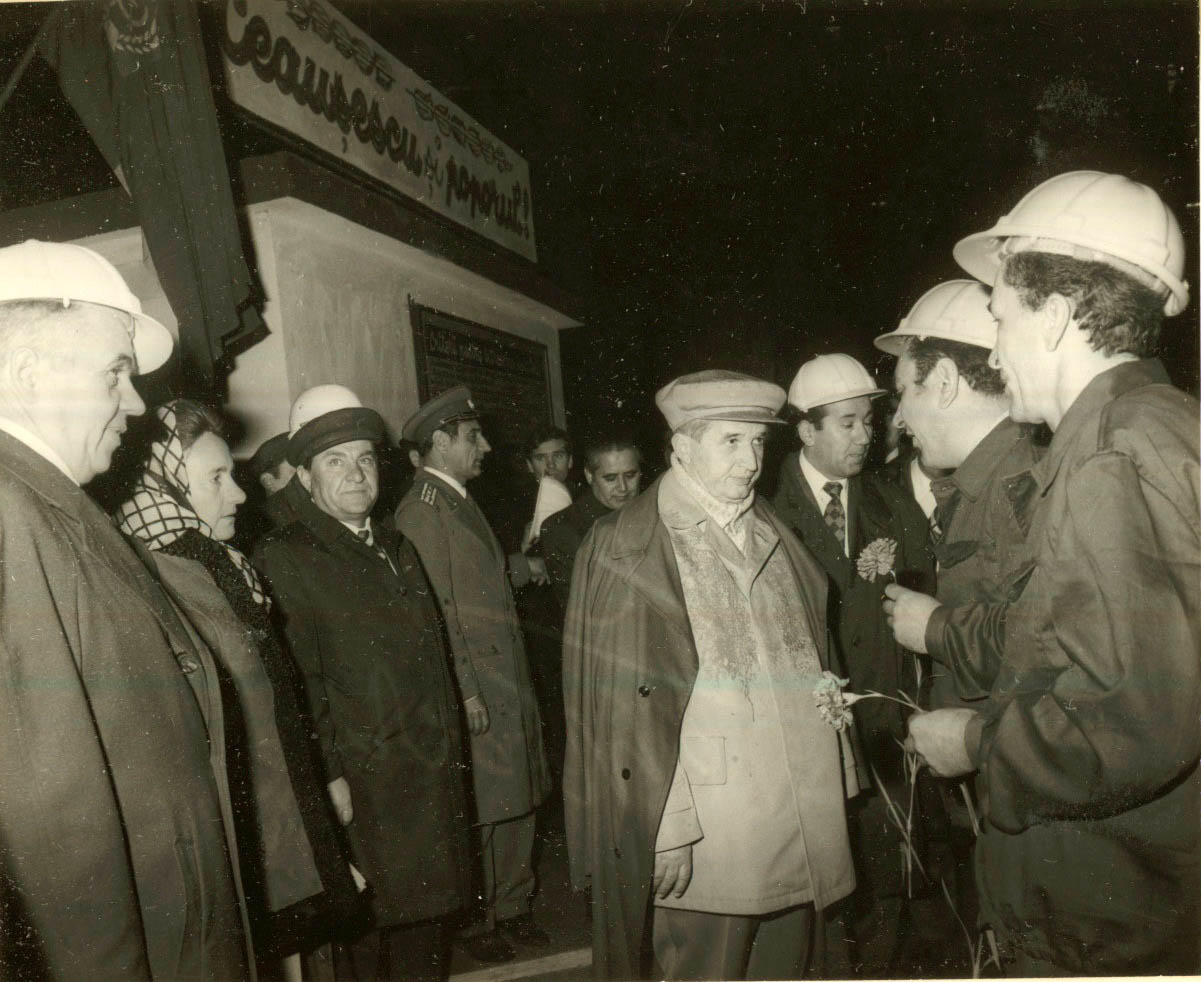
Nicolae Ceaușescu visiting the works in 1977

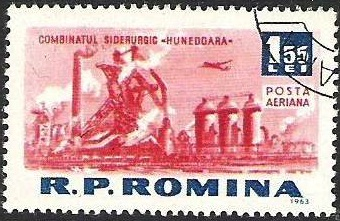
1963 postage stamp featuring the works

== See also ==
- Galați steel works
