= Nădrab =

- Location within Romania

Location
- Country: Romania
- Counties: Hunedoara County
- Villages: Govăjdia

Physical characteristics
- Mouth: Govăjdia
  - location: Govăjdia
  - coordinates: 45.7406°N 22.7920°E
- Length: 18 km (11 mi)
- Basin size: 52 km^{2} (20 sq mi)

Basin features
- Progression: Govăjdia→ Cerna→ Mureș→ Tisza→ Danube→ Black Sea
- Tributaries
  - left: Sohodol

The Nădrab is a right tributary of the river Govăjdia in Romania. It flows into the Govăjdia in the village Govăjdia. Its length is 18 km (11 mi) and its basin size is 52 km^{2} (20 sq mi).
