= Peștiș (Cerna) =

- Location within Romania

Location
- Country: Romania
- Counties: Hunedoara County
- Villages: Nandru, Josani, Pestișu Mic, Peștișu Mare

Physical characteristics
- Mouth: Cerna
  - location: Peștișu Mare
  - coordinates: 45.7958°N 22.9288°E
- Length: 22 km (14 mi)
- Basin size: 54 km^{2} (21 sq mi)

Basin features
- Progression: Cerna→ Mureș→ Tisza→ Danube→ Black Sea
- Tributaries
  - left: Valea Boului

The Peștiș is a left tributary of the river Cerna in Romania. It discharges into the Cerna in Peștișu Mare. Its length is 22 km (14 mi) and its basin size is 54 km^{2} (21 sq mi).
