= Bordul =

Bordul may refer to:

- Bordul, a tributary of the Cerna in Hunedoara County, Romania
- Bordul, a tributary of the Nădrag in Timiș County, Romania

== See also ==
- Gura Bordului, a village in Hunedoara County, Romania
