= Neagu River =

Neagu River may refer to:

- Neagu, a tributary of the Sebeș in Alba County, Romania
- Neagu, a tributary of the Valea Mare in Alba County, Romania

== See also ==
- Neagu (disambiguation)
- Negoiu River (disambiguation)
