= Cristur =

Cristur may refer to:

- Cristuru Secuiesc, a town in Harghita County, Romania, also called Cristur-Odorhei
- Cristur-Şieu, a village in Șieu-Odorhei Commune, Bistriţa-Năsăud County, Romania
- Criţ, a village in Buneşti Commune, Braşov County, Romania, formerly called Cristuru Săsesc
- Cristur, a village in Deva city, Hunedoara County, Romania
- Cristur-Crişeni, a village in Crişeni Commune, Sălaj County, Romania
- Crestur, a village in Petreu Commune, Bihor County, Romania
- Recea-Cristur, a commune in Cluj County, Romania
- Cristur (river), a river in Hunedoara County, Romania
