= Bunila (river) =

- Location within Romania

Location
- Country: Romania
- Counties: Hunedoara County

Physical characteristics
- Mouth: Cerna
  - location: near Hășdău
  - coordinates: 45.6670°N 22.6912°E
- Length: 13 km (8.1 mi)
- Basin size: 24 km^{2} (9.3 sq mi)

Basin features
- Progression: Cerna→ Mureș→ Tisza→ Danube→ Black Sea

The Bunila is a left tributary of the river Cerna in Romania. It discharges into the Cerna near Hășdău. Its length is 13 km (8.1 mi) and its basin size is 24 km^{2} (9.3 sq mi).
