= Govăjdia =

Govăjdia Runc
- Location within Romania

Location
- Country: Romania
- Counties: Hunedoara County
- Villages: Runcu Mare, Govăjdia

Physical characteristics
- Mouth: Cerna
  - location: Downstream of Lake Cinciş
  - coordinates: 45.7035°N 22.8781°E
- Length: 37 km (23 mi)
- Basin size: 155 km^{2} (60 sq mi)

Basin features
- Progression: Cerna→ Mureș→ Tisza→ Danube→ Black Sea
- Tributaries
  - left: Valea Răchițelii, Cerbăl
  - right: Mărgineu, Nădrab

The Govăjdia (also: Runc) is a left tributary of the river Cerna in Romania. It discharges into the Cerna in Teliucu Superior, downstream from the Cinciș Dam. Its length is 37 km (23 mi) and its basin size is 155 km^{2} (60 sq mi).
