= Valea Bisericii =

Valea Bisericii may refer to several places in Romania:

- Valea Bisericii, a village in Samarinești Commune, Gorj County
- Valea Bisericii, a village in Drăgoești Commune, Ialomița County
- Valea Bisericii, a tributary of the Colceag in Ialomița County, Romania
- Valea Bisericii, a tributary of the Cristur in Hunedoara County, Romania
