= Teliuc mine =

Iron mine in Romania

- Location: Teliucu Inferior, Hunedoara County, Romania
- Products: Iron ore
- Production: 100,000 tonnes of iron ore
- Financial year: 2008
- Opened: 1900

The Teliuc mine is a large open pit mine in the western of Romania in Hunedoara County, 15 km west of Hunedoara and 406 km north-west of the capital, Bucharest. Teliuc represents one of the largest iron ore reserves in Romania having estimated reserves of 3 million tonnes of ore. The mine produces around 100,000 tonnes of iron ore/year.
