= Negoiu River =

Negoiu River may refer to:

- Negoiu, a tributary of the Bistrița in Gorj County
- Negoi, a tributary of the Cerna in Hunedoara County
- Negoiu, a tributary of the Greci in Tulcea County
- Negoiu, a tributary of the Ilva in Mureș County

== See also ==
- Negoiu Peak
- Neagu River (disambiguation)
- Negovanu River
