= Cristur (river) =

- Location within Romania

Location
- Country: Romania
- Counties: Hunedoara County
- Villages: Cârjiți, Popești, Almașu Mic, Cristur

Physical characteristics
- Mouth: Cerna
  - location: Cristur
  - coordinates: 45.8257°N 22.9489°E
- Length: 14 km (8.7 mi)
- Basin size: 37 km^{2} (14 sq mi)

Basin features
- Progression: Cerna→ Mureș→ Tisza→ Danube→ Black Sea
- Tributaries
  - right: Valea Bisericii

The Cristur (also: Valea Cristurului or Cârjiți) is a left tributary of the river Cerna in Romania. It flows into the Cerna in the village Cristur. Its length is 14 km (8.7 mi) and its basin size is 37 km^{2} (14 sq mi).
