= Neagoe =

Neagoe or Neagoie is a Romanian surname of Old Church Slavonic origin, derived from the word neaga (care, nurture) and thus meaning "caretaker", someone who takes good care of those around him.

One of the oldest attestations of Neagoe as a given name is Neagoe Basarab, Voivode (Prince) of Wallachia between 1512 and 1521, from the old princely family of Basarab.

== People with the surname ==
Notable people with the surname include:

- Andrei Neagoe (born 1987), Romanian footballer
- Eugen Neagoe (born 1967), Romanian footballer and manager
- Gogu Neagoe (born 1976), Romanian cartoonist
- Nicolae Neagoe (1941–2023), Romanian bobsledder
- Peter Neagoe (1881–1960), American writer and painter
- Robert Neagoe (born 1982), Romanian footballer
- Ştefan Neagoe (1838–1897), Romanian educator and writer

== People with the given name ==
- Neagoe Basarab, Voivode (Prince) of Wallachia between 1512 and 1521
- Neagoe Ștrehăianul, Romanian Boyar.

== See also ==
- Neagu
- Neagoe Basarab
- All pages with titles beginning with Neagoe
- All pages with titles containing Neagoe
