= Bunila =

- Commune
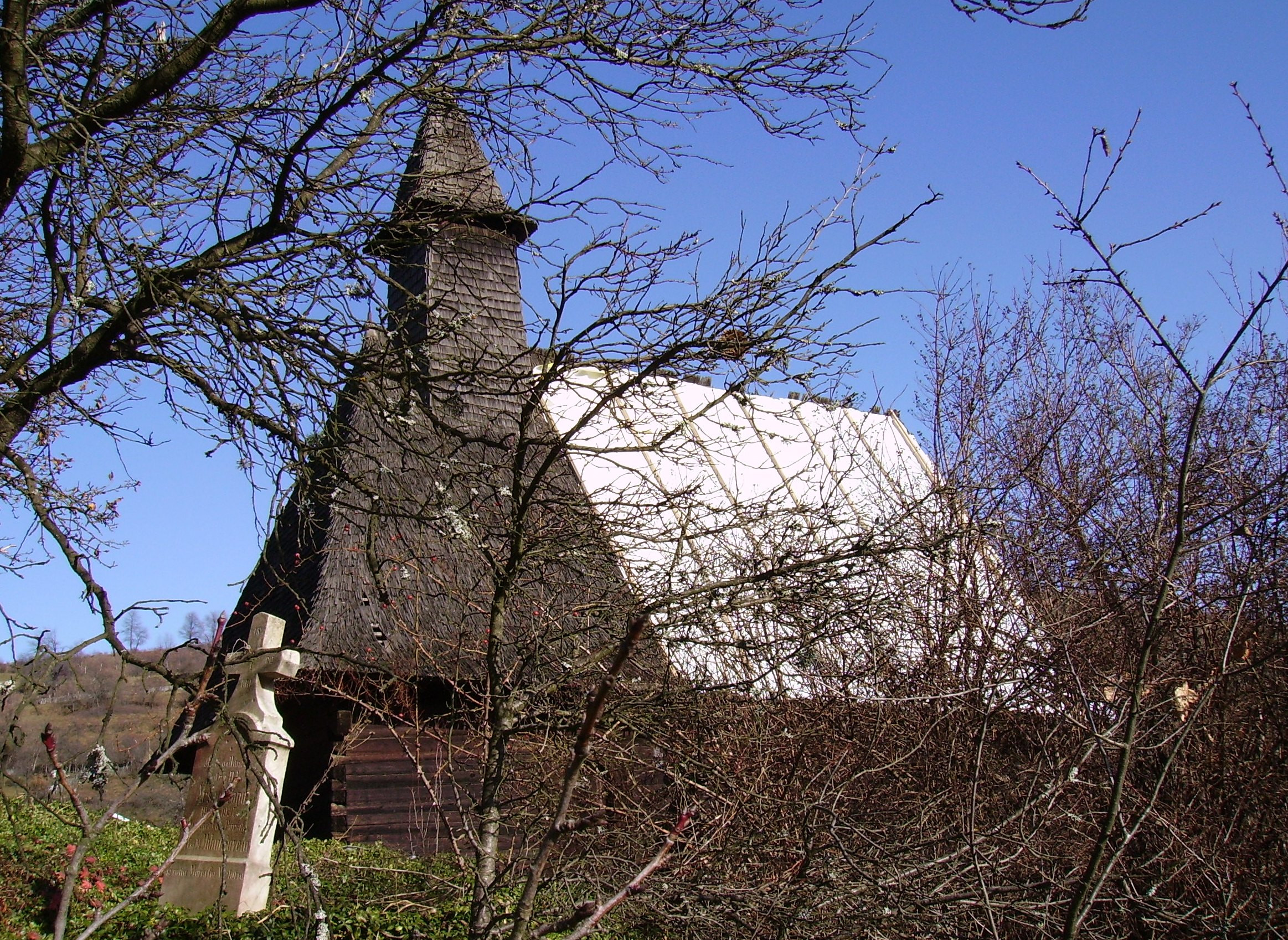
- Wooden church in Alun

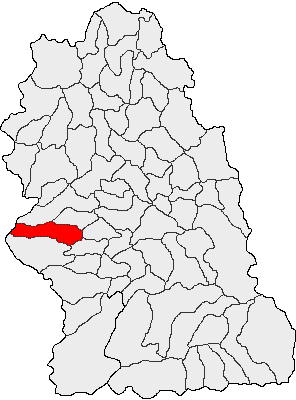
- Location in Hunedoara County

- Location in Romania
- Coordinates: 45°42′N 22°40′E
- Country: Romania
- County: Hunedoara

Government
  - Mayor (2024–2028): Romulus Stroia (PNL)
- Area: 74.09 km^{2} (28.61 sq mi)
- Elevation: 900 m (3,000 ft)
- Population (2021-12-01): 247
  - Density: 3.33/km^{2} (8.63/sq mi)
- Time zone: UTC+02:00 (EET)
  - Summer (DST): UTC+03:00 (EEST)
- Postal code: 337160
- Area code: (+40) 0254
- Vehicle reg.: HD
- Website: primariacomuneibunila.ro

Bunila (Hungarian: Bunyila) is a commune in Hunedoara County, Transylvania, Romania. It is composed of five villages: Alun (Álun), Bunila, Cernișoara Florese (Csernisorfloresza), Poienița Voinii (Poienicavojni), and Vadu Dobrii (Vádudobri).

The commune is situated in the Poiana Ruscă Mountains, at an altitude of 900 m (3,000 ft), on the banks of the river Vălărița. It is located in the western part of Hunedoara County, 26 km (16 mi) southwest of Hunedoara, on the border with Timiș County.

Historical population
Year	Pop.	±%
1850	1,106	—
1930	1,692	+53.0%
2002	462	−72.7%
2011	306	−33.8%
2021	247	−19.3%
Source: Census data

At the 2021 census, the commune had a population of 247, of which 83.81% were Romanians and 2.02% Hungarians. As of 2025, there have been no births registered since then in Bunila.
