= Toplița, Hunedoara =

Toplița
- Commune
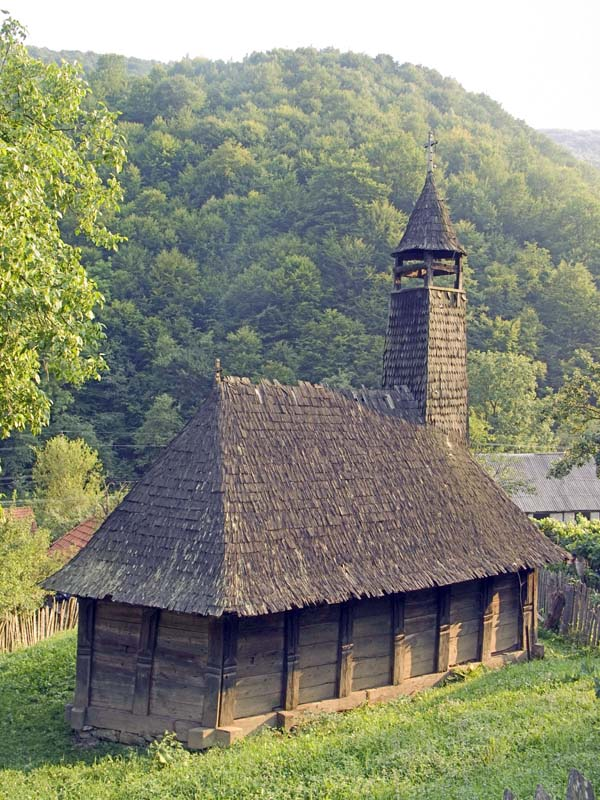
- Wooden church in Vălari

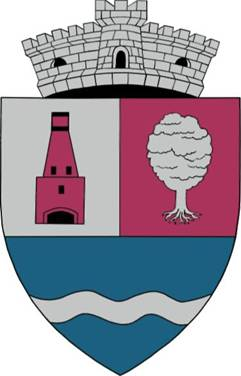
- Coat of arms

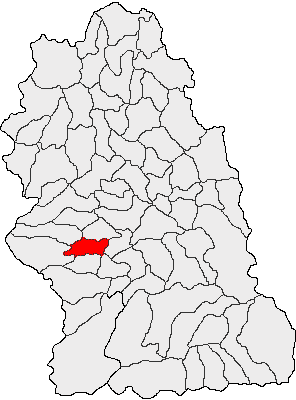
- Location in Hunedoara County

- Location in Romania
- Coordinates: 45°41′N 22°47′E
- Country: Romania
- County: Hunedoara

Government
  - Mayor (2024–2028): Alin Adrian Vișan (PSD)
- Area: 50.75 km^{2} (19.59 sq mi)
- Elevation: 372 m (1,220 ft)
- Population (2021-12-01): 624
  - Density: 12.3/km^{2} (31.8/sq mi)
- Time zone: UTC+02:00 (EET)
  - Summer (DST): UTC+03:00 (EEST)
- Postal code: 337480
- Area code: (+40) 02 54
- Vehicle reg.: HD
- Website: toplita-hunedoara.ro

Toplița (Hungarian: Királybányatoplica) is a commune in Hunedoara County, Transylvania, Romania. It is composed of eight villages: Curpenii Silvașului, Dăbâca (Doboka), Dealu Mic (Párosza), Goleș (Golles), Hășdău (Hosdó), Mosoru (Moszor), Toplița, and Vălari (Valár).

The commune is located in the central-west part of the county, 18 km (11 mi) southwest of Hunedoara, at the foot of the Poiana Ruscă Mountains. It lies on the banks of the Cerna River and its tributary, the Bunila.

Historical population
Year	Pop.	±%
1850	1,376	—
1910	2,202	+60.0%
2002	882	−59.9%
2011	715	−18.9%
2021	624	−12.7%
Source: Census data
