= Neagu =

Neagu is a Romanian-language name.

== People with the surname ==
- Alexandru Cătălin Neagu (born 1993), Romanian professional footballer
- Alexandru Neagu (1948–2010), Romanian footballer
- Andreas Neagu (born 1985), German-born Romanian bobsledder
- Cristian Neagu (born 1980), Romanian retired footballer and manager
- Cristina Neagu (born 1988), Romanian professional handballer
- Dragoș Neagu (born 1967), retired Romanian rower
- Fănuș Neagu (1932–2011), Romanian writer
- George Neagu (born 1985), Romanian professional footballer
- Ionuț Neagu (born 1989), Romanian professional footballer
- Marian Neagu (born 1991), Romanian professional footballer
- Paul Neagu (1938–2004), British-Romanian artist
- Răzvan Neagu (born 1987), Romanian former football player
- Theodor Anton Neagu (1932–2017), Romanian micropaleontologist & stratigrapher
- Traian Neagu (born 1987), Romanian sprint canoeist

== People with the given name ==
- Neagu Bratu (born 1935), Romanian former sports shooter
- Neagu Djuvara (1916–2018), Romanian historian, essayist, philosopher, journalist, novelist and diplomat
- Neagu Rădulescu (1912–1972), Romanian prose writer and caricaturist

== See also ==
- Neagoe
