= Cerna (Mureș) =

Cerna Cserna-patak, Cerna Hunedoreană, Cerna Ardeleană
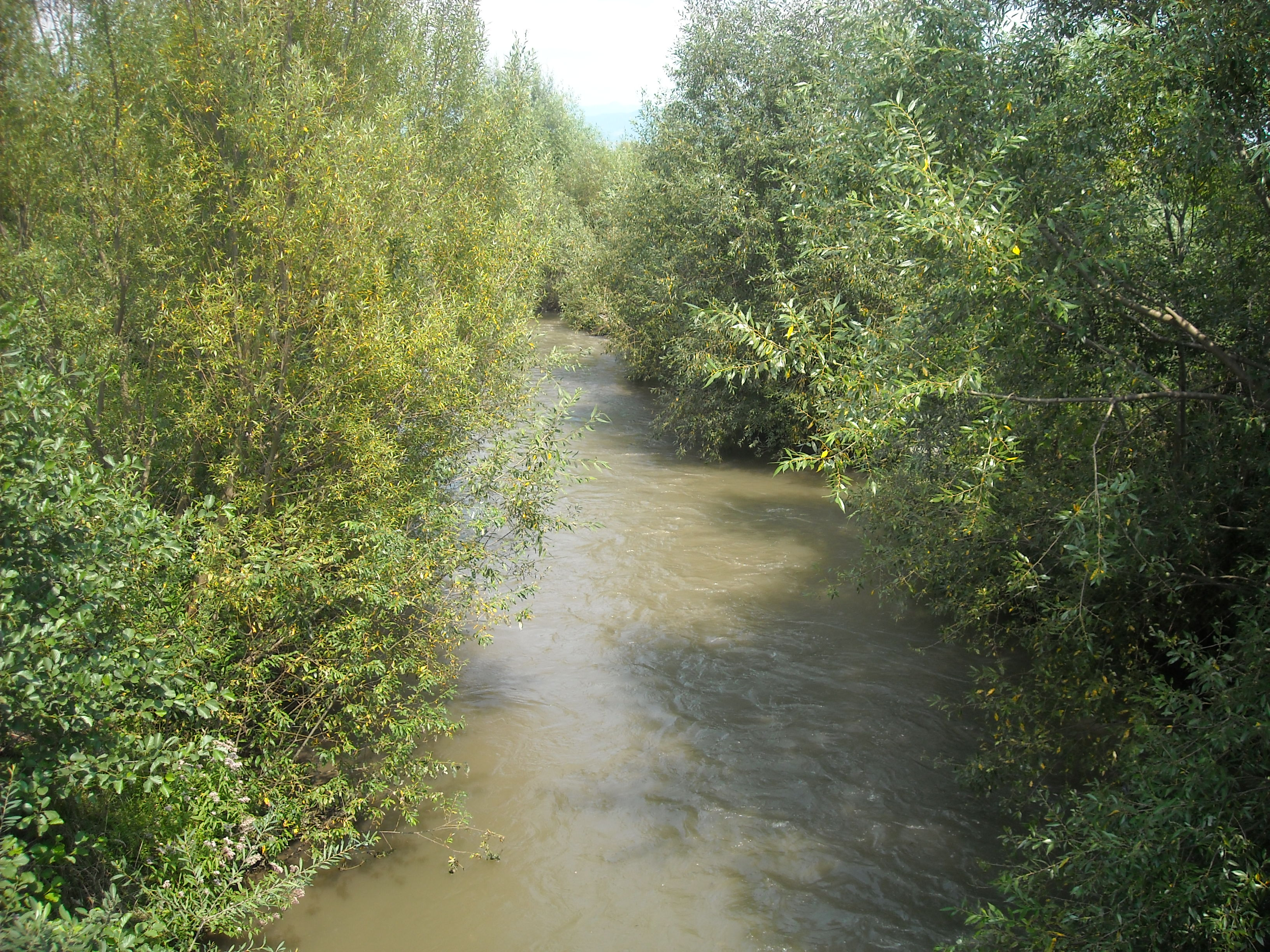

- Location within Romania

Location
- Country: Romania
- Counties: Hunedoara County
- Communes: Lunca Cernii de Jos, Toplița, Teliucu Inferior, Hunedoara, Deva, Simeria

Physical characteristics
- Source: Poiana Ruscă Mountains
- Mouth: Mureș
  - location: Upstream of Deva
  - coordinates: 45°53′1″N 22°56′59″E
- Length: 73 km (45 mi)
- Basin size: 727 km^{2} (281 sq mi)

Basin features
- Progression: Mureș→ Tisza→ Danube→ Black Sea
- Tributaries
  - left: Govăjdia

The Cerna (also: Cerna Hunedoreană or Cerna Ardeleană, Hungarian: Cserna-patak) is a left tributary of the river Mureș in Transylvania, Romania. Its name both in Romanian and Hungarian languages originates from a Slav language, meaning "black (water)". Its source is in the Poiana Ruscă Mountains. It flows through the town Hunedoara and the villages Gura Bordului, Lunca Cernii de Sus, Lunca Cernii de Jos, Hășdău, Dăbâca, Toplița, Cinciș-Cerna, Teliucu Superior, Teliucu Inferior, Peștișu Mare and Sântandrei. It discharges into the Mureș in Sântuhalm near Deva. Its length is 73 km (45 mi) and its basin size is 727 km^{2} (281 sq mi).

== Tributaries ==
The following rivers are tributaries to the river Cerna (from source to mouth):

- Left: Bordul, Ireanc, Sălicea, Bunila, Vălărița, Govăjdia, Zlaști, Peștiș, Cristur, Valea Ursului
- Right: Cernușorița, Negoi, Hășdău, Lingina, Valea Boții
