= Pestișu Mic =

- Commune
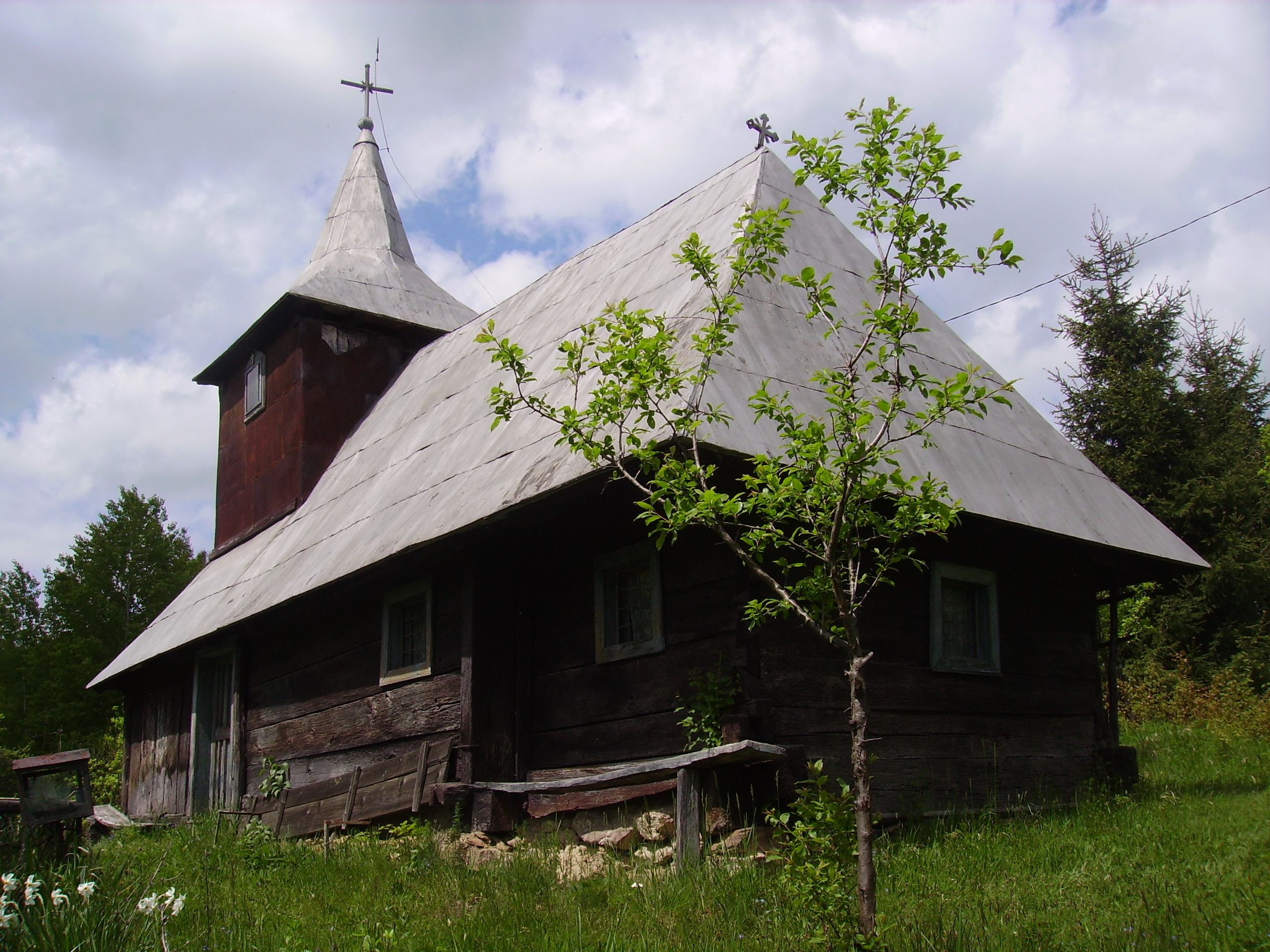
- Wooden church in Cutin

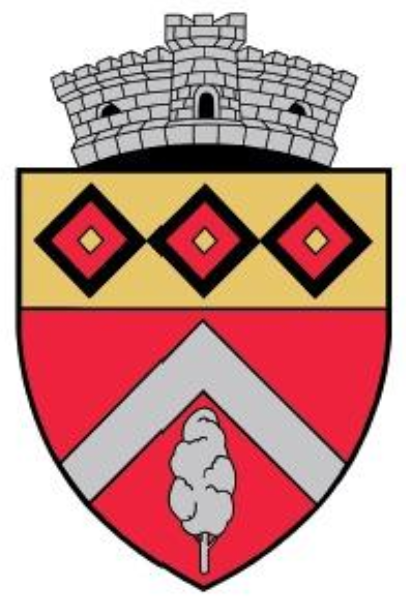
- Coat of arms

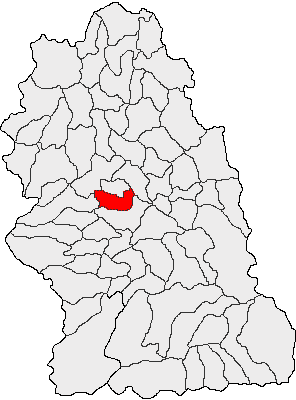
- Location in Hunedoara County

- Location in Romania
- Coordinates: 45°48′N 22°53′E
- Country: Romania
- County: Hunedoara

Government
  - Mayor (2024–2028): Saul-Daniel Dobruțchi (PNL)
- Area: 52.27 km^{2} (20.18 sq mi)
- Elevation: 259 m (850 ft)
- Population (2021-12-01): 1,250
  - Density: 23.9/km^{2} (61.9/sq mi)
- Time zone: UTC+02:00 (EET)
  - Summer (DST): UTC+03:00 (EEST)
- Postal code: 337335
- Area code: (+40) 0254
- Vehicle reg.: HD
- Website: primariapestisumic.ro

Pestișu Mic (Hungarian: Felsőpestes) is a commune in Hunedoara County, Transylvania, Romania. It is composed of nine villages: Almașu Mic (Keresztényalmás), Ciulpăz (Csulpesz), Cutin (Kutyén), Dumbrava (Erdőhát), Josani (Zsoszány), Mănerău (Magyarosd), Nandru (Nándor), Pestișu Mic, and Valea Nandrului (Nándorválya).

Historical population
Year	Pop.	±%
1850	2,356	—
1910	2,509	+6.5%
2002	1,290	−48.6%
2011	1,207	−6.4%
2021	1,250	+3.6%
Source: Census data
