= Lunca Cernii de Jos =

- Commune
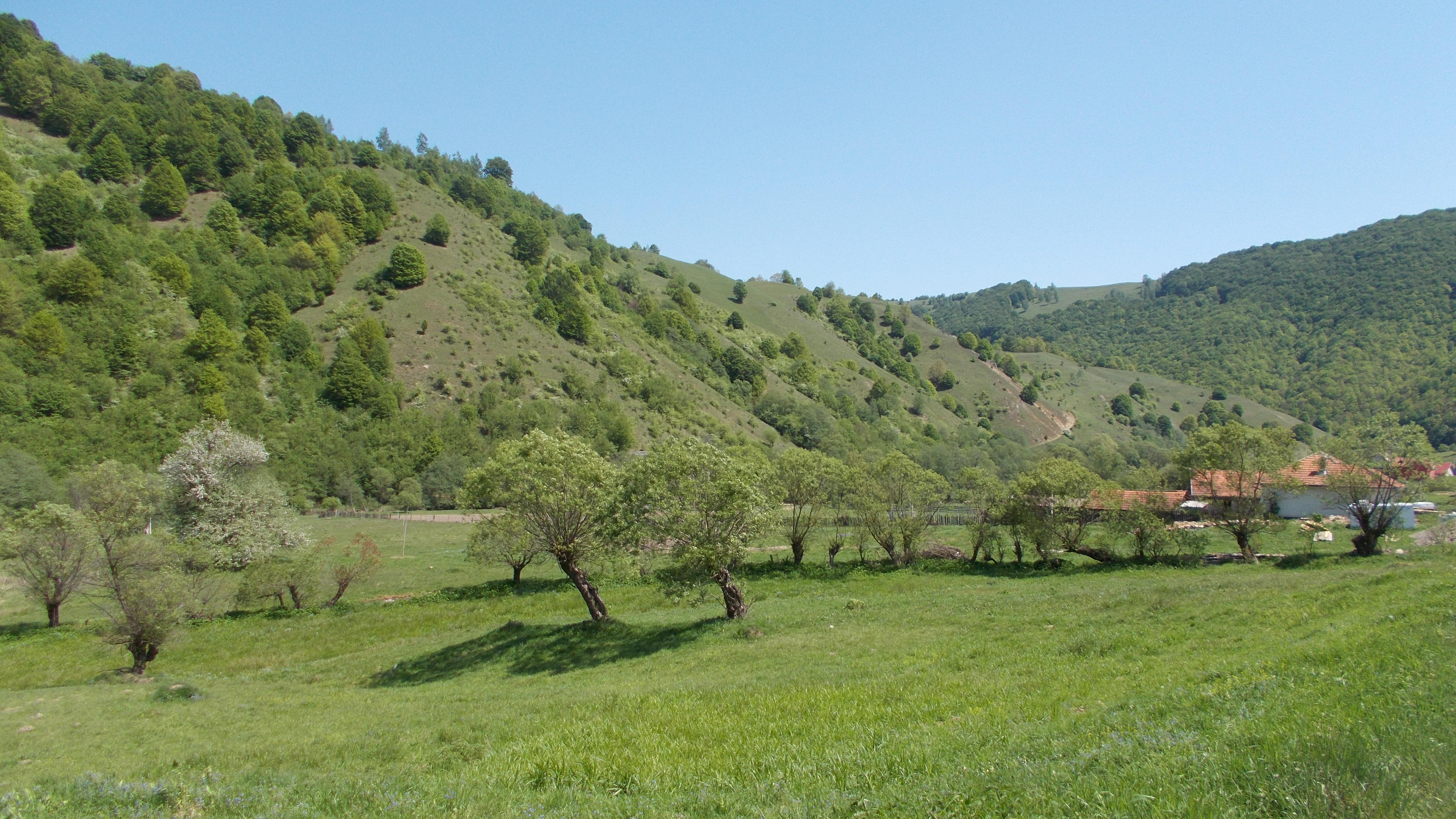
- Lunca Cernii de Jos

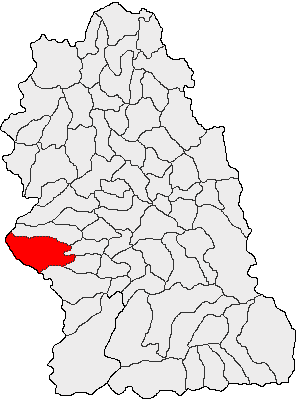
- Location in Hunedoara County

- Location in Romania
- Coordinates: 45°38′N 22°37′E
- Country: Romania
- County: Hunedoara

Government
  - Mayor (2024–2028): Luminița Valentina Lupulescu (PNL)
- Area: 152.05 km^{2} (58.71 sq mi)
- Elevation: 850 m (2,790 ft)
- Highest elevation: 1,000 m (3,300 ft)
- Lowest elevation: 565 m (1,854 ft)
- Population (2021-12-01): 758
  - Density: 4.99/km^{2} (12.9/sq mi)
- Time zone: UTC+02:00 (EET)
  - Summer (DST): UTC+03:00 (EEST)
- Postal code: 337300
- Area code: (+40) 02 54
- Vehicle reg.: HD
- Website: comunaluncacerniidejos.ro

Lunca Cernii de Jos (Hungarian: Alsónyiresfalva, German: Birkendorf) is a commune in Hunedoara County, Transylvania, Romania. It is composed of eight villages: Ciumița (Csumicapuszta), Fântâna (Vádtelep), Gura Bordului, Lunca Cernii de Jos, Lunca Cernii de Sus (Felsőnyiresfalva), Meria (Kékesfalva), Negoiu (Nyegojlunka), and Valea Babii.

== Geography ==
The commune is located in the southwestern part of the county. The nearest city is Hunedoara, 46 km (29 mi) distant; the county seta, Deva, is 70 km (43 mi) to the northeast. Lunca Cernii de Jos is situated among the foothills of the Poiana Ruscă Mountains. The average altitude is 850 m (2,790 ft), and the terrain is hilly. The commune borders two other counties, Caraș-Severin and Timiș.

== Villages ==
Name	Population (2011)	Coordinates
Ciumița	0	45°39′49″N 22°34′44″E
Fântâna	25	45°40′10″N 22°35′29″E
Gura Bordului	58	45°38′12″N 22°31′56″E
Lunca Cernii de Jos	157	45°37′59″N 22°37′0″E
Lunca Cernii de Sus	229	45°38′21″N 22°35′3″E
Meria	246	45°39′38″N 22°38′1″E
Negoiu	171	45°36′39″N 22°33′48″E
Valea Babii	19	45°37′27″N 22°34′25″E

The name of the commune derives from lunca ("valley") of the Cerna River. Lunca Cernii de Jos and Lunca Cernii de Sus lie for 11 km (6.8 mi) along the river valley; the local peasantry works in animal husbandry and logging. Meria is located on a mountainside at over 1,000 m (3,300 ft) altitude, separated from other villages by high peaks, deep valleys and dense forest. Negoiu is situated in the Negoiului and Sterminosului valleys.

Historical population
Year	Pop.	±%
1850	1,620	—
1956	4,334	+167.5%
2002	1,116	−74.3%
2011	905	−18.9%
2021	758	−16.2%
Source: Census data

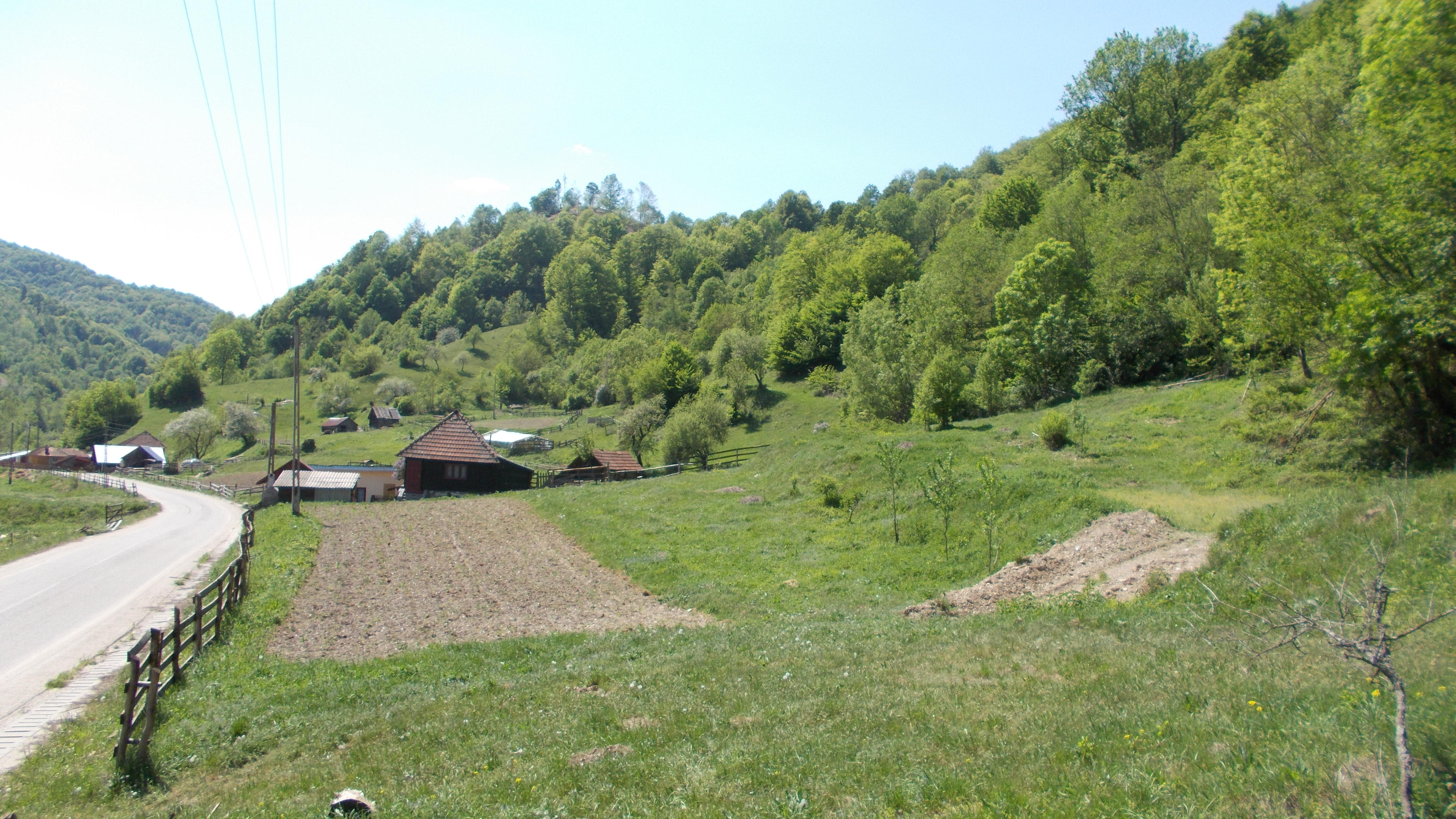
Gura Bordului

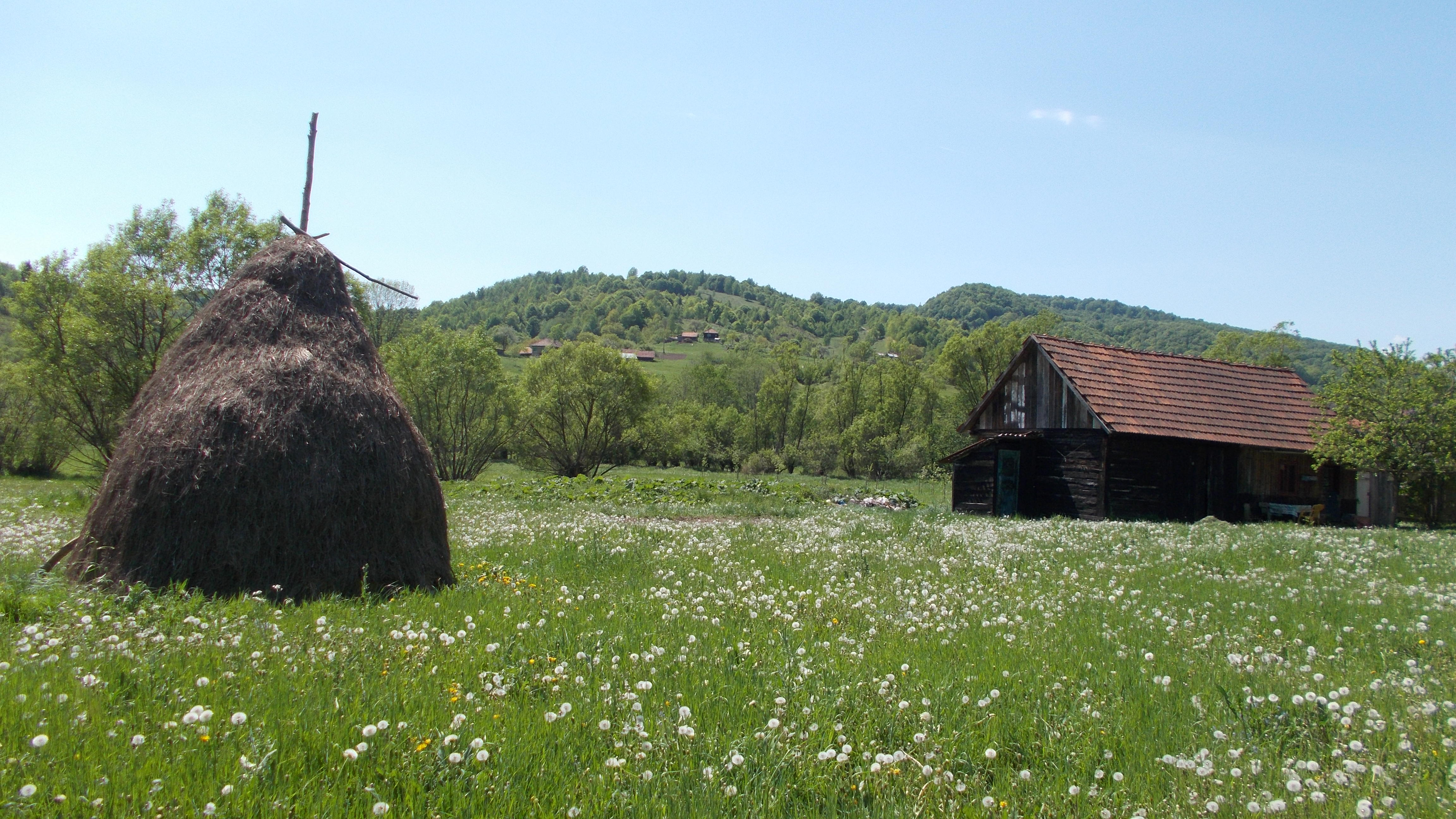
Lunca Cernii de Sus

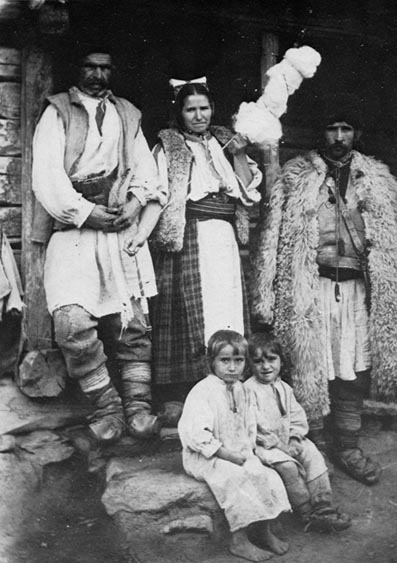
Peasant family in Meria (1911)
