= Teliucu Inferior =

- Commune
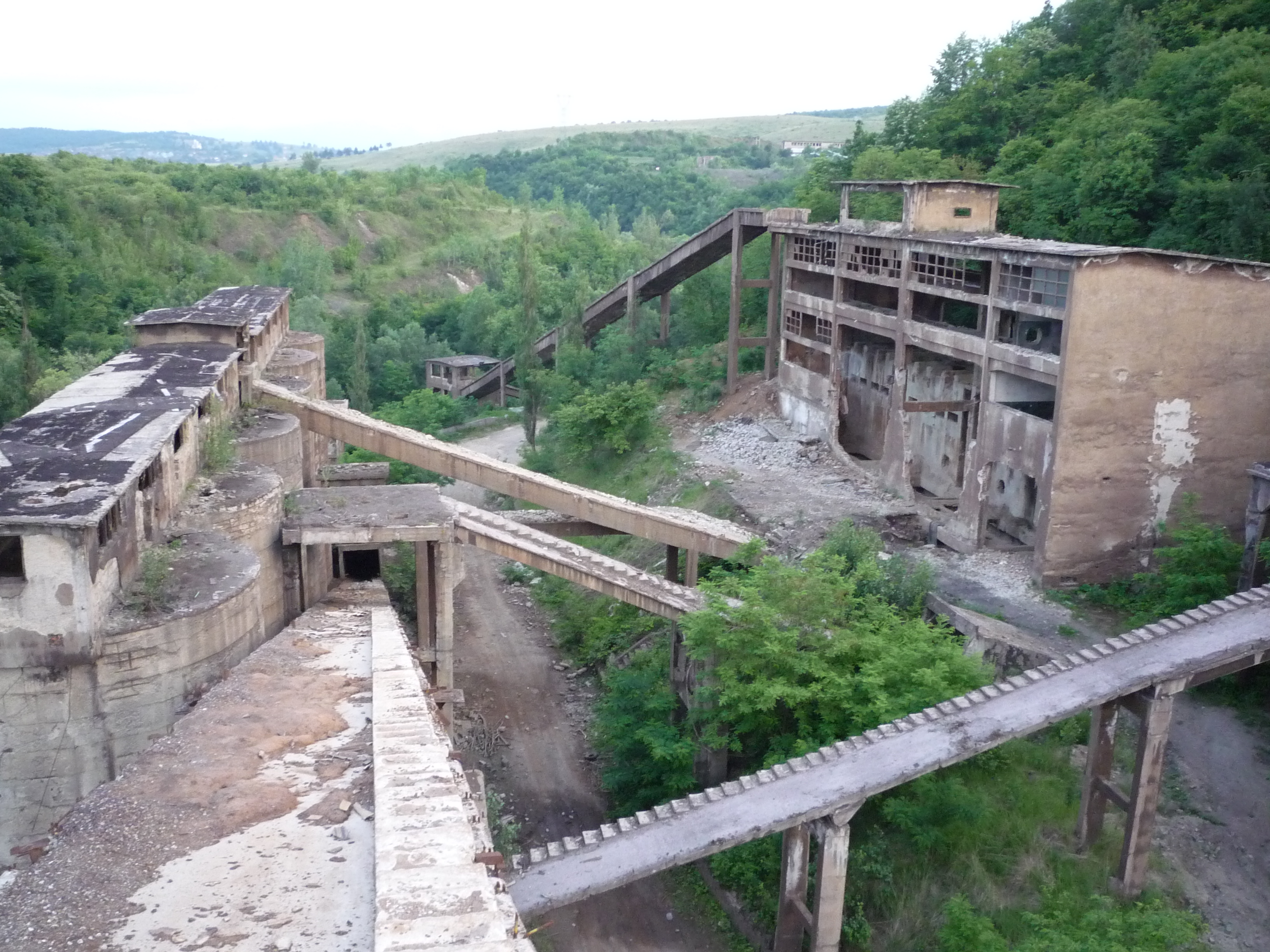
- Abandoned coal preparation plant in Teliucu Inferior

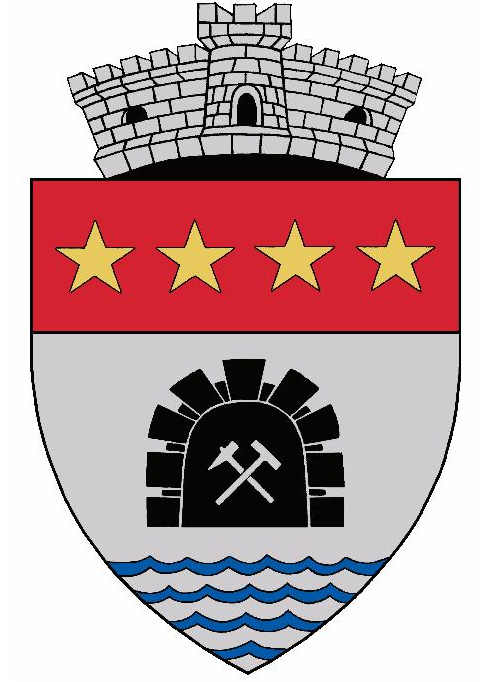
- Coat of arms

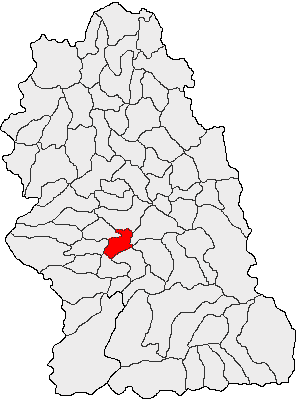
- Location in Hunedoara County

- Location in Romania
- Coordinates: 45°43′N 22°53′E
- Country: Romania
- County: Hunedoara

Government
  - Mayor (2024–2028): Daniel Gheorghe Sorin Pupeză (PNL)
- Area: 39.50 km^{2} (15.25 sq mi)
- Elevation: 268 m (879 ft)
- Population (2021-12-01): 2,022
  - Density: 51.19/km^{2} (132.6/sq mi)
- Time zone: UTC+02:00 (EET)
  - Summer (DST): UTC+03:00 (EEST)
- Postal code: 337465
- Area code: (+40) 02 54
- Vehicle reg.: HD
- Website: comuna-teliucu-inferior.ro

Teliucu Inferior (Hungarian: Alsótelek, German: Untertelek) is a commune in Hunedoara County, Transylvania, Romania. It is composed of four villages: Cinciș-Cerna (Csolnakoscserna), Izvoarele (Lindzsina), Teliucu Inferior, and Teliucu Superior (Felsőtelek).

Iron mining began there in Roman times. The Teliuc mine is a large open pit mine located on the territory of the commune.

Historical population
Year	Pop.	±%
1850	1,219	—
1966	6,156	+405.0%
2002	2,552	−58.5%
2011	2,344	−8.2%
2021	2,022	−13.7%
Source: Census data

== Natives ==
- Aurel Țicleanu (born 1959), football manager and former player
- Remus Vlad (born 1946), football manager and former player
