= Hunedoara County =

County of Romania

Hunedoara County Județul Hunedoara
- County
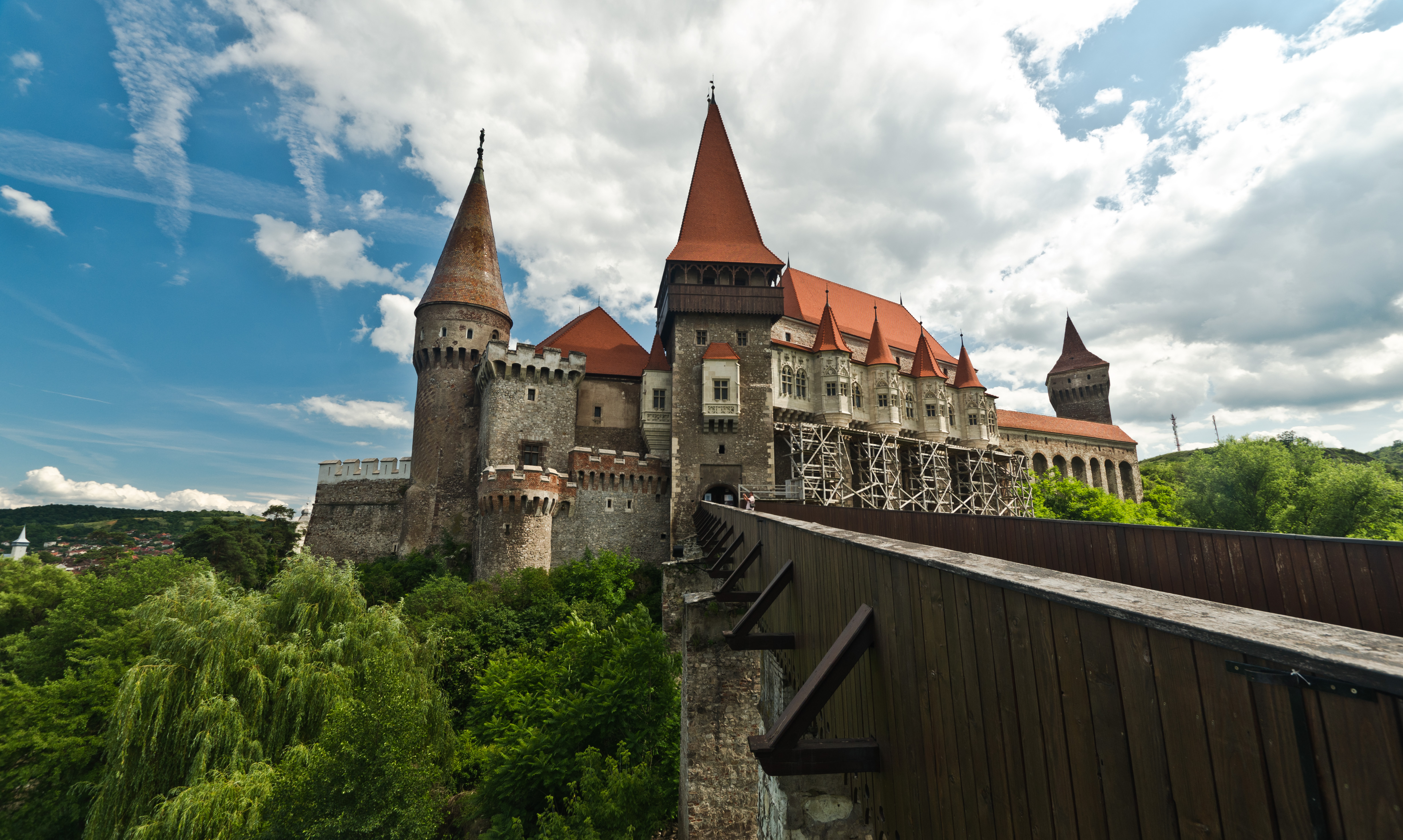
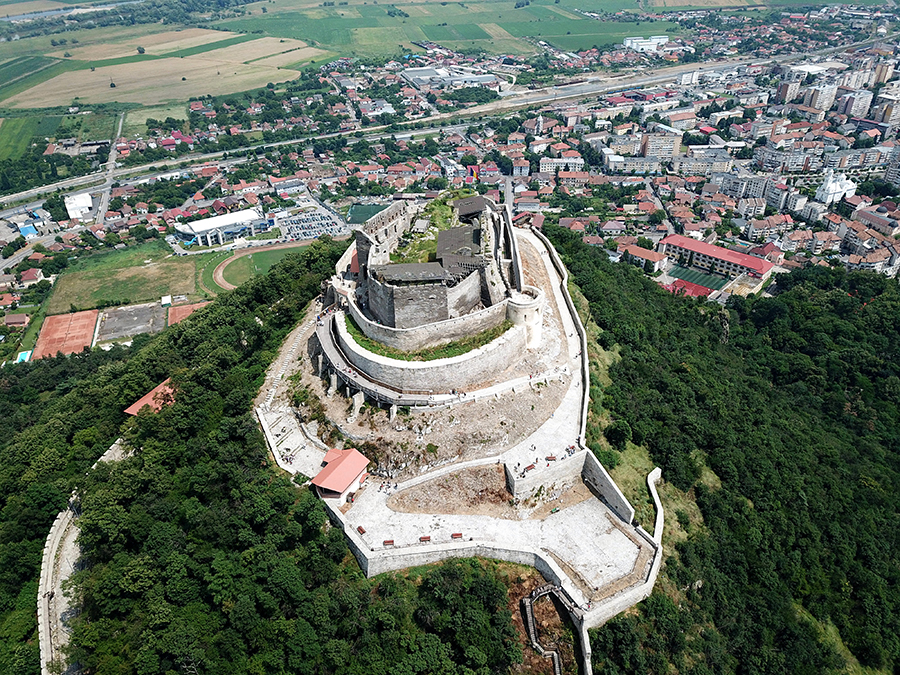
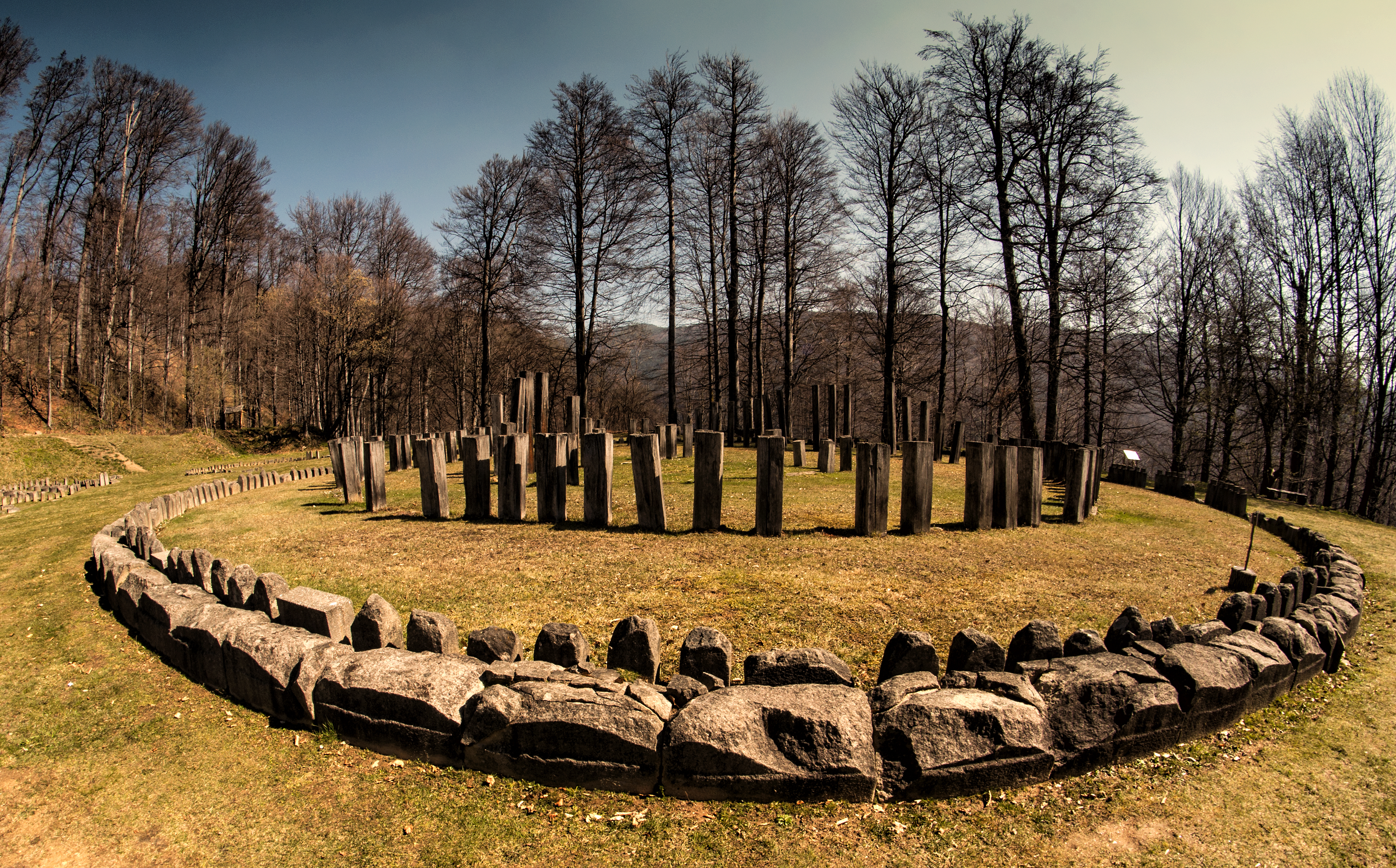
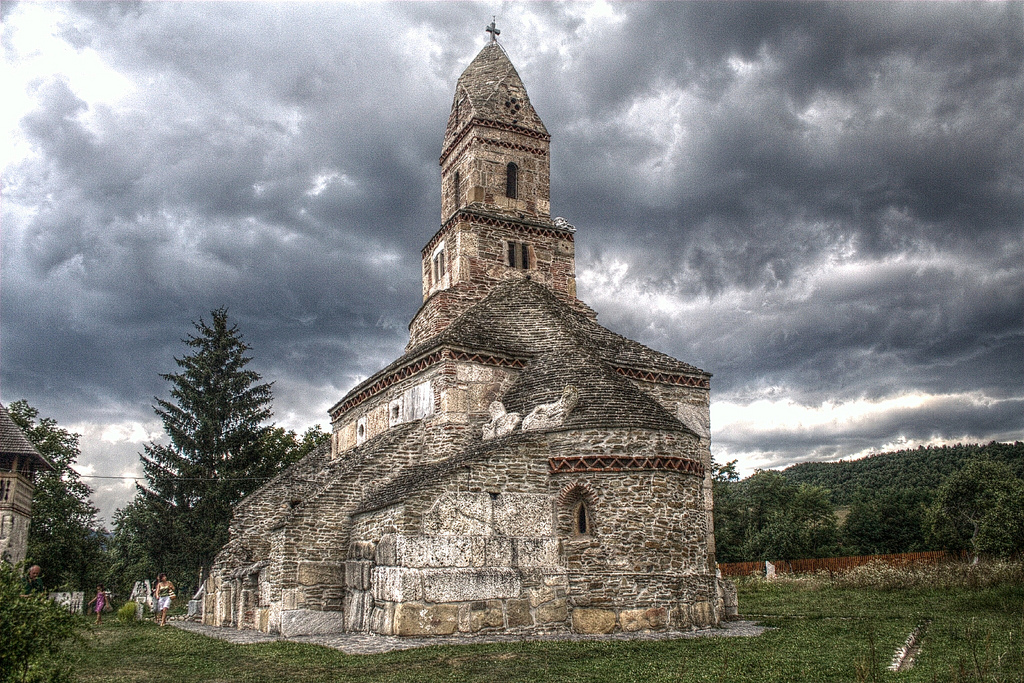
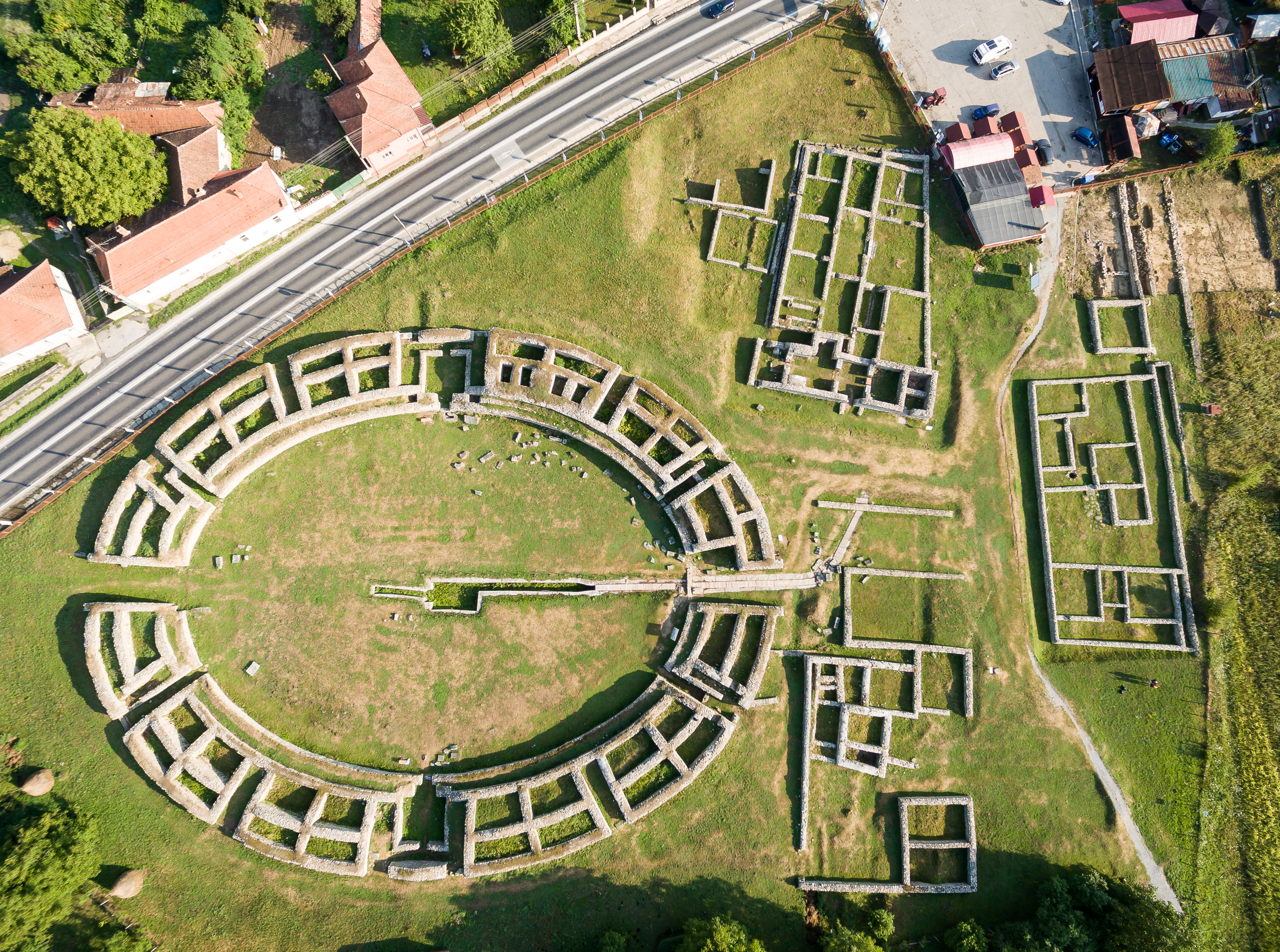
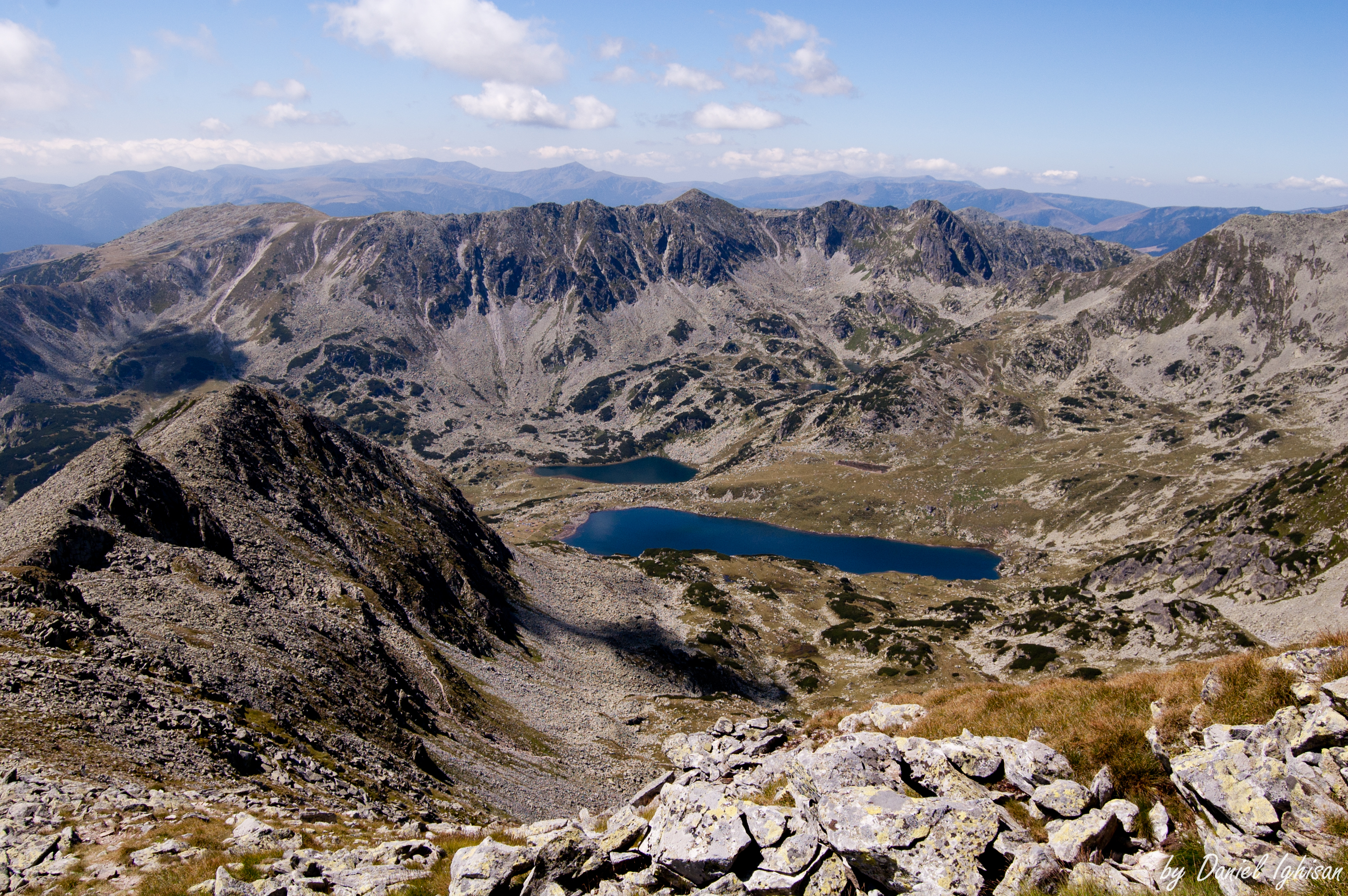
- Corvin Castle Fortress of Deva Sarmizegetusa Regia Densuș Church Ulpia Traiana Sarmizegetusa Bucura Lake

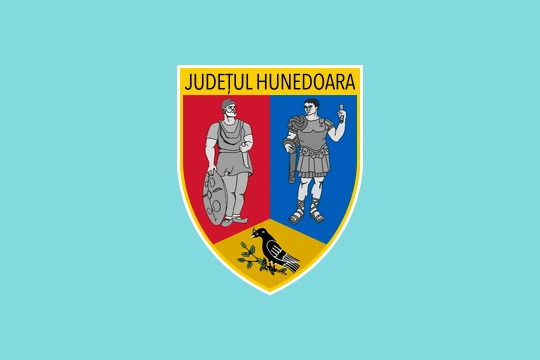
- Flag Coat of arms

- Coordinates: 45.78°N 22.93°E
- Country: Romania
- Development region: Vest
- Historical region: Transylvania
- Capital: Deva

Government
  - Type: County Board
  - President of the County Board: Laurențiu Nistor (PSD)
  - Prefect: Lörincz Széll (UDMR)

Area
  - Total: 7,063 km^{2} (2,727 sq mi)
  - Rank: 9th

Population (2021-12-01)
  - Total: 361,657
  - Rank: 20th
  - Density: 51.20/km^{2} (132.6/sq mi)
- Telephone code: (+40) 254 or (+40) 354
- ISO 3166 code: RO-HD
- GDP (nominal): US$ 5.980 billion (2025)
- GDP per capita: US$ 16,535 (2025)
- Website: County Council; Prefecture www.orastie.info

Hunedoara County (Romanian pronunciation: [huneˈdo̯ara]) is a county (județ) of Romania. Hunedoara County is located in the Transylvania region with a few divisions in the north being located in the Crișana region. Its capital city is Deva, and it's located on the left bank of the Mureș River. The county is also part of the Danube–Criș–Mureș–Tisa Euroregion.

== Name ==
In Hungarian, it is known as Hunyad megye, in German as Kreis Hunedoara, and in Slovak as Huňadská župa. The county got its name from the city of Hunedoara (Hungarian: Vajdahunyad), which is the Romanian transliteration of the Hungarian Hunyadvár (lit. 'Castle of Hunyad', archaic: Hwnyadwar), old name of the municipality. That most likely originated from the Hungarian huny verb meaning 'to close' or 'to die', but may also come from where the name of the Huns, who were headquartered near for a time and were the first to establish solid rule over the land since the Dacians.

== Geography ==

This county has a total area of 7,063 km^{2}.

Mainly, the relief is made up of mountains, divided by the Mureș River valley which crosses the county from East to West. To the North side there are the Apuseni Mountains and to the South side there are mountains from the Southern Carpathians group, Parâng Mountains group and Retezat-Godeanu Mountains group: Orastie and Surianu Mountains (South-East), Retezat Mountains (South), Poiana Ruscai Mountains (South-West).

Except from the Mureș River with its tributaries Strei, Râul Mare and Cerna which forms wide valleys, in the North side Crișul Alb River also forms a valley in the Apuseni Mountains - Zarand region. In the South side along the Jiu River with its two branches Jiul de Vest and Jiul de Est, there is a large depression, and an accessible route towards Southern Romania - Oltenia.

=== Neighbours ===
- Alba County in the East and North.
- Arad County, Timiș County and Caraș-Severin County in the West.
- Gorj County in the South.
- Vâlcea County in the South-East.

== Economy ==
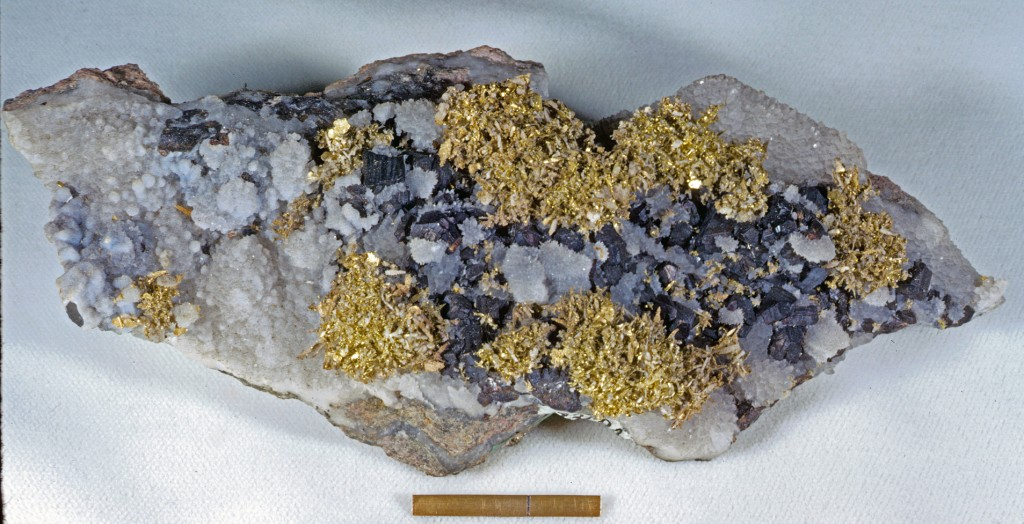
Gold and sphalerite on quartz, from Sacarîmb, Hunedoara County. Scale at bottom is one inch, with a rule at one cm.

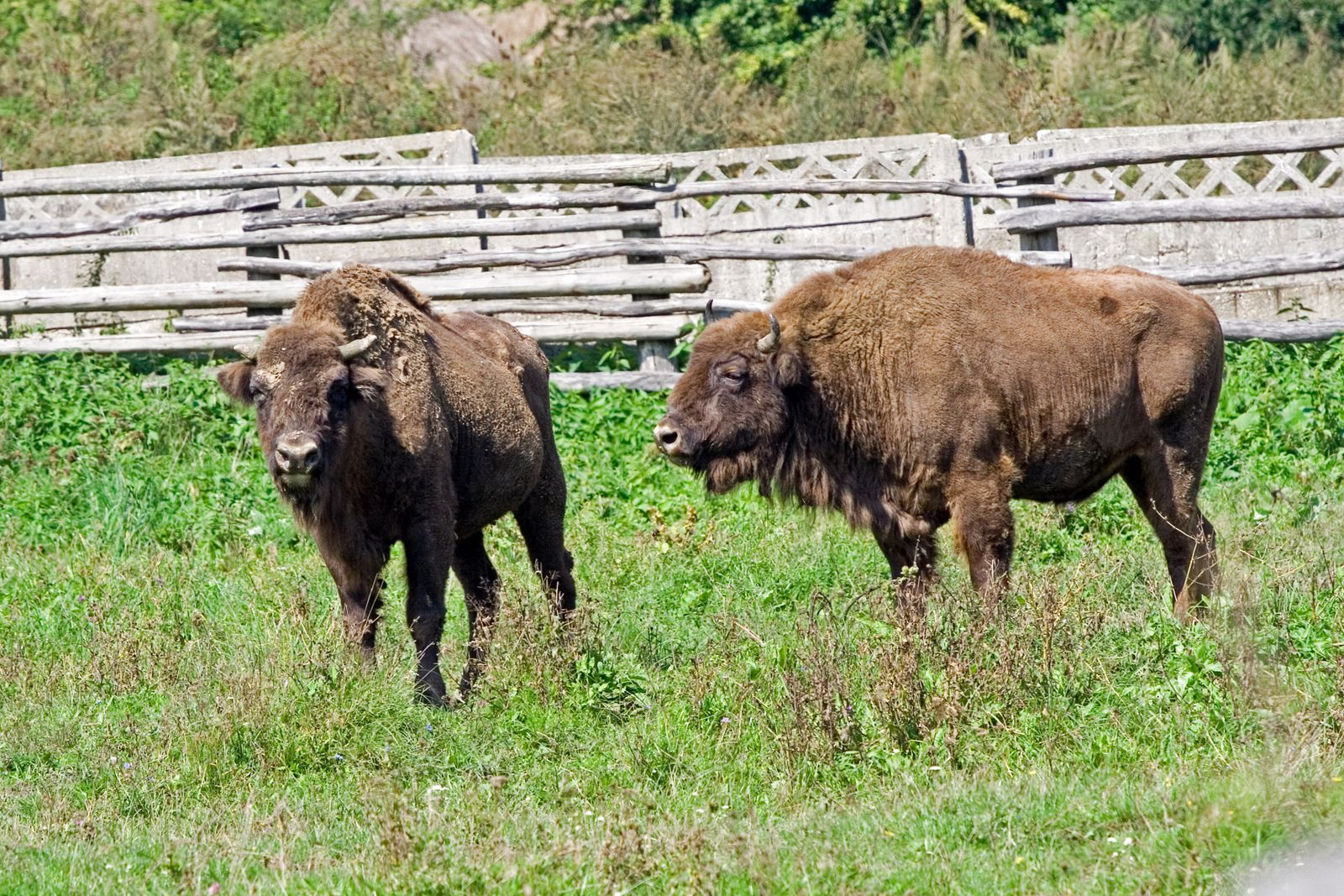
European bison in Hațeg nature reserve

Hunedoara County was one of the most industrialised areas during the communist period, and was very negatively affected when the industry collapsed after the fall of the communist regime.

The industry in the Hunedoara county is linked with the mining activity in the region. In the mountains, from ancient times, metals and coal have been exploited.

Energy-related enterprises are located in the county - one of the biggest thermoelectric plant is located at Mintia.

The Jiu Valley, located in the south of the country, has been a major mining area throughout the second half of the 19th century and the 20th century, but many mines were closed down in the years following the collapse of the communist regime.

The city of Hunedoara has also suffered significantly from the 1990s onwards - under communism it contained the largest steel works in Romania (until Galați took the lead), but activity gradually diminished after the fall of communism due to the loss of the market. This was a blow to the overall prosperity of the town, which is now recovering through new investments.

Agricultural activities also take place in Hunedoara county, which include livestock raising, and fruit and cereal cultivation. The county also has touristic potential, especially through the Dacian Fortresses of the Orăștie Mountains and the Corvin Castle.

The predominant industries in the county are:

- Metallurgy.
- Construction materials.
- Textile industry.
- Mining equipment.
- Food industry.

In the 1990s, a large number of mines were closed down, leaving Hunedoara county with the highest unemployment rate in Romania, of 9.6%, in comparison to the national average of 5.5%.

== Tourism ==
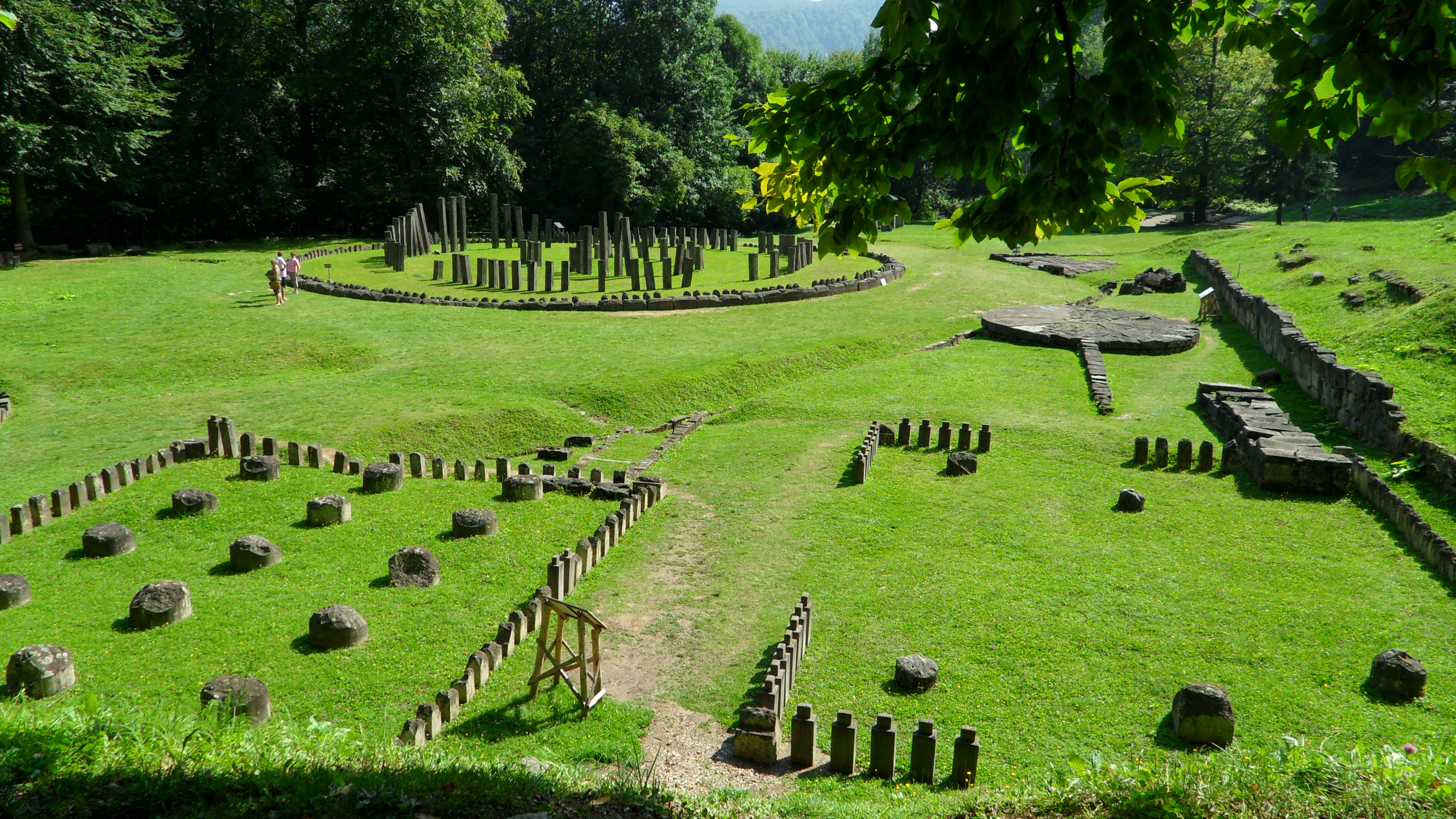
Ruins of Dacian temples of Sarmizegetusa Regia

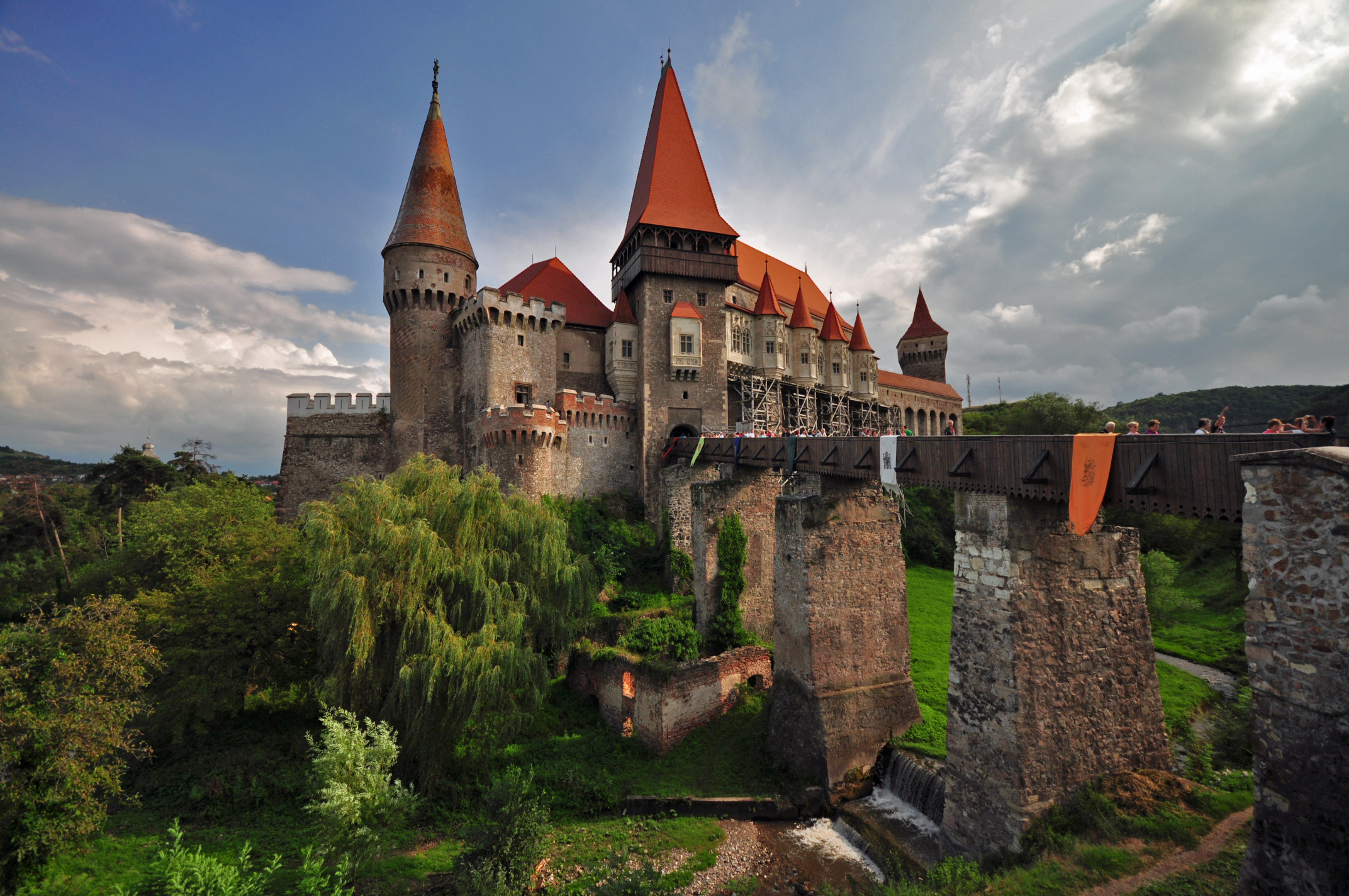
Corvin Castle in Hunedoara is one of the largest medieval castles in Europe and features in one of the lists of the Seven Wonders of Romania.

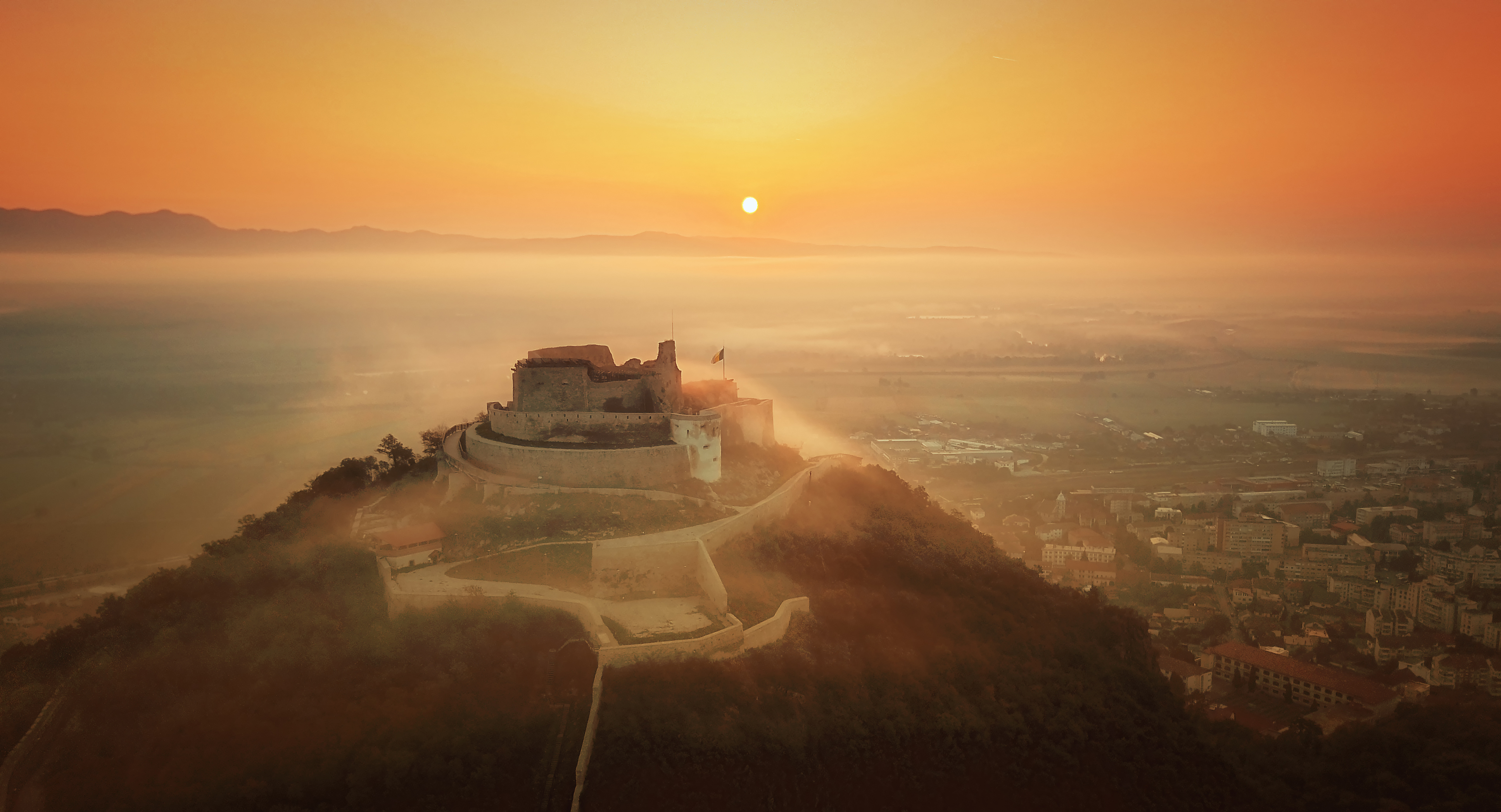
Fortress of Deva in Deva

Retezat National Park is one of the counties in Romania, you can also find the Dacian and Roman complexes in the Orăştie Mountains.

The main tourist attractions in the county are:

- The Dacian Fortresses of the Orăștie Mountains - nowadays part of UNESCO World Heritage.
- Colonia Augusta Ulpia Traiana Dacica Sarmizegetusa - the capital of the Roman province of Dacia.
- The medieval edifices of Densuș, Deva, Hunedoara, Santămaria-Orlea, Strei.
- The Medieval Castle from Hunedoara
- The Medieval Guard Tower from Crivadia
- The Via Transilvanica long-distance hiking and biking trail, which crosses the county

== Demographics ==
According to the 2021 census, the county had a population of 361,657 and the population density was 51.2/km^{2} (132.6/sq mi).

The population of Hunedoara county is the second eldest of all Romanian counties, with an average age of the residents of 45.5 years, only behind Teleorman County (46.3 years). Hunedoara's Jiu River Valley is traditionally a coal-mining region, and its high level of industrialisation drew many people from other regions of Romania in the period before the fall of the communist regime.

Ethnic composition of Hunedoara County (2021)
1. Romanians (95.0%)
2. Hungarians (2.90%)
3. Romani (1.72%)
4. Germans (Transylvanian Saxons) (0.16%)
5. Others (0.21%)

Year	County population
1948	306,955
1956	381,902 ▲
1966	474,602 ▲
1977	514,436 ▲
1992	547,993 ▲
2002	485,712 ▼
2011	396,253 ▼
2021	361,657 ▼

== Politics ==
The Hunedoara County Council, renewed at the 2024 local elections, consists of 32 councilors, with the following party composition:

Party	Seats	Current County Council
Social Democratic Party (PSD)	16	
National Liberal Party (PNL)	9	
Alliance for the Union of Romanians (AUR)	7	

== Administrative divisions ==
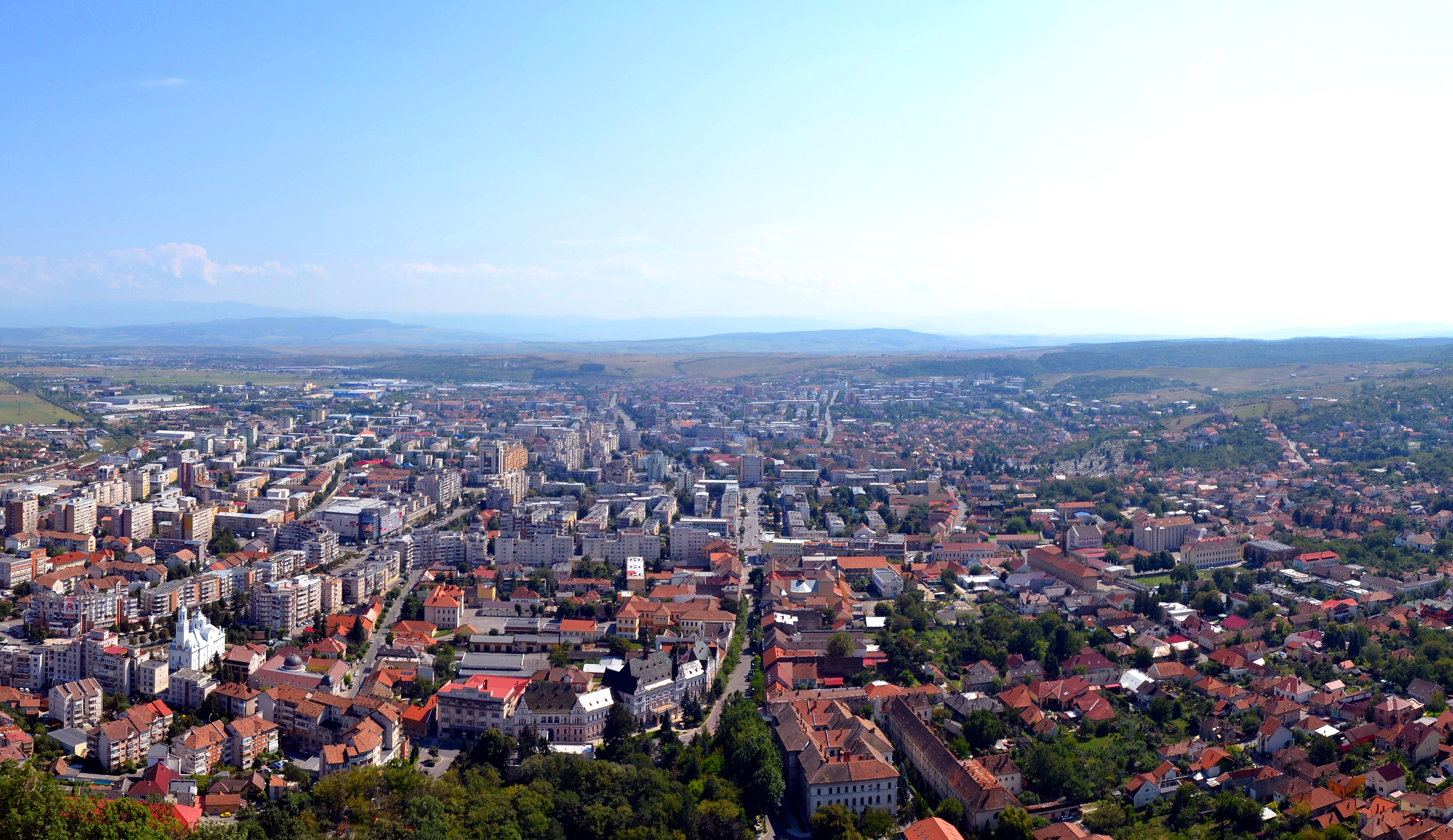
Deva

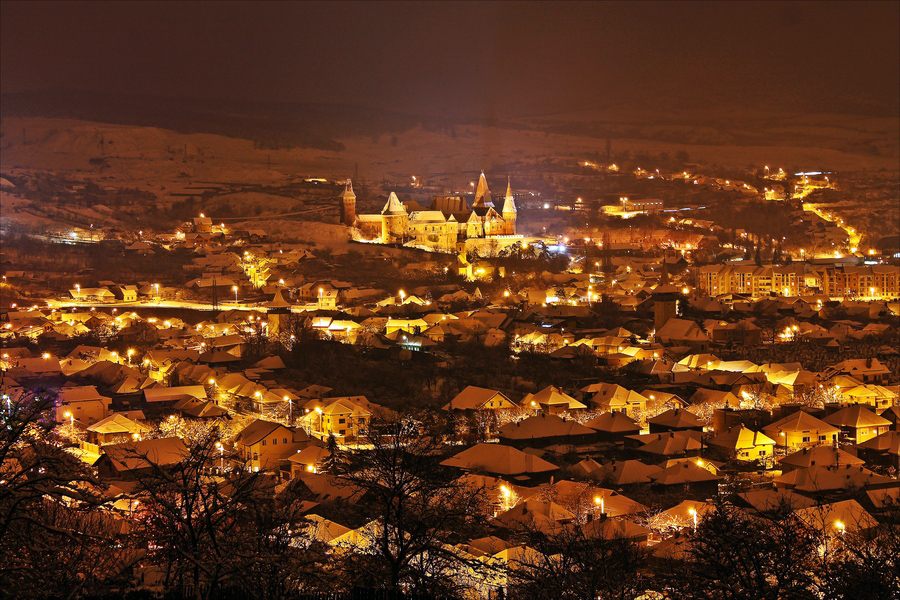
Hunedoara

Hunedoara County has 7 municipalities, 7 towns and 55 communes. Although Hunedoara County is the most urbanized county in Romania (75% of the population is urban - in 2011) it does not contain any city of more than 100,000 people. Also, following the de-industrialization after the communism fall, the major urban centres in the county, particularly Hunedoara and Petroșani, suffered significant population decline.

- Municipalities
  - Brad - population: 12,690 (as of 2021)
  - Deva - capital city; population: 53,113 (as of 2021)
  - Hunedoara - population: 50,457 (as of 2021)
  - Lupeni - population: 18,699 (as of 2021)
  - Orăștie - population: 16,825 (as of 2021)
  - Petroșani - population: 31,044 (as of 2021)
  - Vulcan - population: 19,772 (as of 2021)
- Towns
  - Aninoasa
  - Călan
  - Geoagiu
  - Hațeg
  - Petrila
  - Simeria
  - Uricani
- Communes
  - Baia de Criș
  - Balșa
  - Bănița
  - Baru
  - Băcia
  - Băița
  - Bătrâna
  - Beriu
  - Blăjeni
  - Boșorod
  - Brănișca
  - Bretea Română
  - Buceș
  - Bucureșci
  - Bulzeștii de Sus
  - Bunila
  - Burjuc
  - Cerbăl
  - Certeju de Sus
  - Cârjiți
  - Crișcior
  - Densuș
  - Dobra
  - General Berthelot
  - Ghelari
  - Gurasada
  - Hărău
  - Ilia
  - Lăpugiu de Jos
  - Lelese
  - Lunca Cernii de Jos
  - Luncoiu de Jos
  - Mărtinești
  - Orăștioara de Sus
  - Pestișu Mic
  - Pui
  - Rapoltu Mare
  - Răchitova
  - Ribița
  - Râu de Mori
  - Romos
  - Sarmizegetusa
  - Sălașu de Sus
  - Sântămăria-Orlea
  - Șoimuș
  - Teliucu Inferior
  - Tomești
  - Toplița
  - Totești
  - Turdaș
  - Vața de Jos
  - Vălișoara
  - Vețel
  - Vorța
  - Zam

== Historical county ==
Județul Hunedoara
- County (Județ)
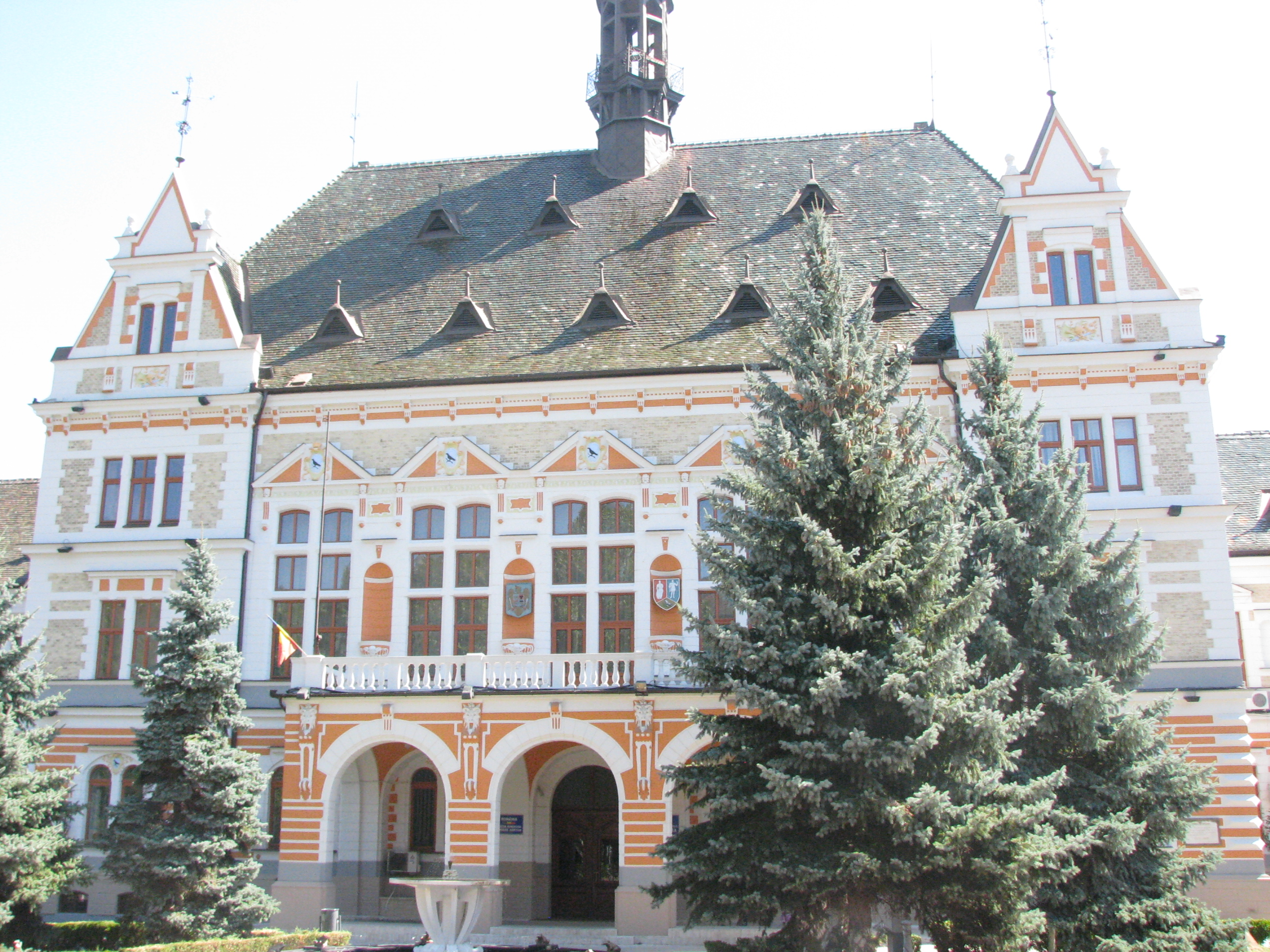
- The Hunedoara County Prefecture building of the interwar period, currently serving the same function.

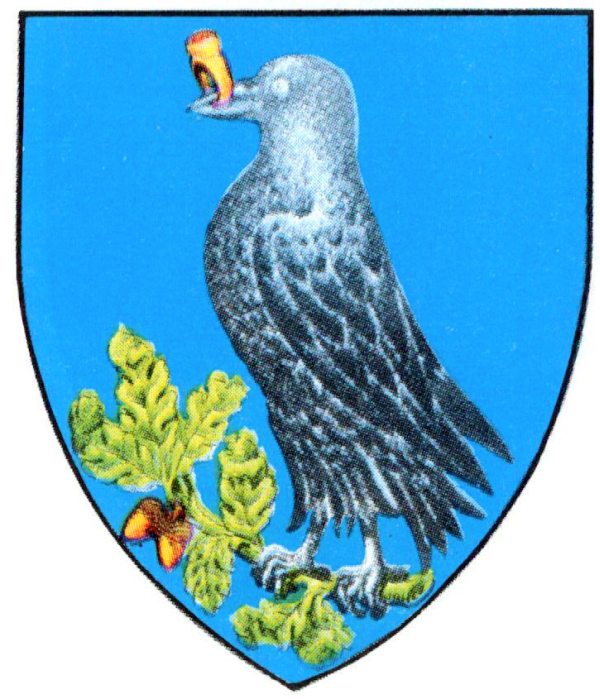
- Coat of arms

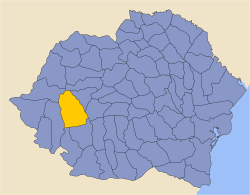
- Country: Romania
- Historic region: Transylvania
- Capital city (Reședință de județ): Deva
- Established: 1925

Area
  - Total: 7,695 km^{2} (2,971 sq mi)

Population (1930)
  - Total: 332,118
  - Density: 43.16/km^{2} (111.8/sq mi)
- Time zone: UTC+2 (EET)
  - Summer (DST): UTC+3 (EEST)

Historically, the county was located in the central-western part of Greater Romania, in the southwestern part of Transylvania. It included a large part of the present Hunedoara County.

After the administrative unification law in 1925, the name of county remained as it was, but the territory was reorganized. It was bordered on the west by the counties of Severin and Arad, to the north by Turda County, to the east by the counties of Sibiu and Alba, and to the south by the counties of Gorj and Mehedinți.

=== Administration ===
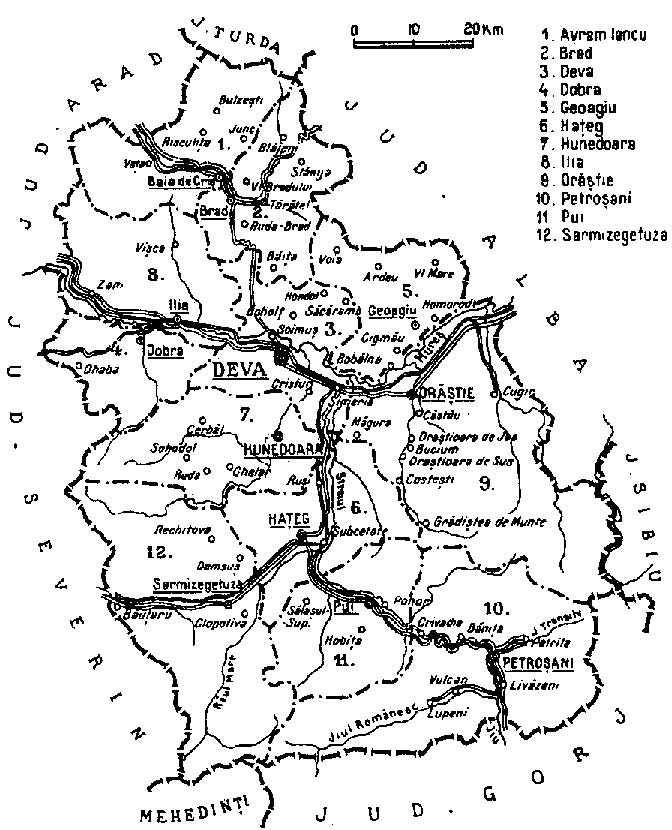
Map of Hunedoara County as constituted in 1938.

The county originally consisted of ten districts (plăși):

1. Plasa Avram Iancu, headquartered at Avram Iancu
2. Plasa Brad, headquartered at Brad
3. Plasa Deva, headquartered at Deva
4. Plasa Geoagiu, headquartered at Geoagiu
5. Plasa Hațeg, headquartered at Hațeg
6. Plasa Hunedoara, headquartered at Hunedoara
7. Plasa Ilia, headquartered at Ilia
8. Plasa Orăștie, headquartered at Orăștie
9. Plasa Petroșani, headquartered at Petroșani
10. Plasa Pui, headquartered at Pui

Subsequently, two other districts were established:

11. Plasa Dobra, headquartered at Dobra
12. Plasa Sarmizegetusa, headquartered at Sarmizegetusa

=== Population ===
According to the census data of 1930, the county's population was 332,118, of which 82.0% were Romanians, 11.3% Hungarians, 2.5% Germans, 1.5% Romanies, 1.4% Jews, as well as other minorities. In the religious aspect, the population consisted of 64.2% Eastern Orthodox, 18.5% Greek Catholic, 9.1% Roman Catholic, 4.5% Reformed, as well as other minorities.

==== Urban population ====
In 1930, the urban population of the county was 41,234, of which 52.8% were Romanians, 30.4% Hungarians, 6.7% Germans, 6.6% Jews, 1.6% Romanies, as well as other minorities. From the religious point of view, the urban population was made up of 42.0% Eastern Orthodox, 25.7% Roman Catholic, 10.5% Greek Catholic, 9.9% Reformed, 6.9% Jewish, 3.5% Lutheran, 1.0% Unitarian, as well as other minorities.

== See also ==
- Hunyad County of the Kingdom of Hungary
