= Bucureșci (river) =

- Location within Romania

Location
- Country: Romania
- Counties: Hunedoara County
- Villages: Curechiu, Bucureșci, Crișcior

Physical characteristics
- Source: Bihor Mountains
- Mouth: Crișul Alb
  - location: Crișcior
  - coordinates: 46.1252°N 22.8634°E
- Length: 17 km (11 mi)
- Basin size: 84 km^{2} (32 sq mi)

Basin features
- Progression: Crișul Alb→ Körös→ Tisza→ Danube→ Black Sea
- Tributaries
  - right: Valea Șeitorilor, Cornet

The Bucureșci is a left tributary of the river Crișul Alb in Romania. It discharges into the Crișul Alb in Crișcior. Its length is 17 km (11 mi) and its basin size is 84 km^{2} (32 sq mi).
