= Transylvanian mining railway =

CFI Hunedoara
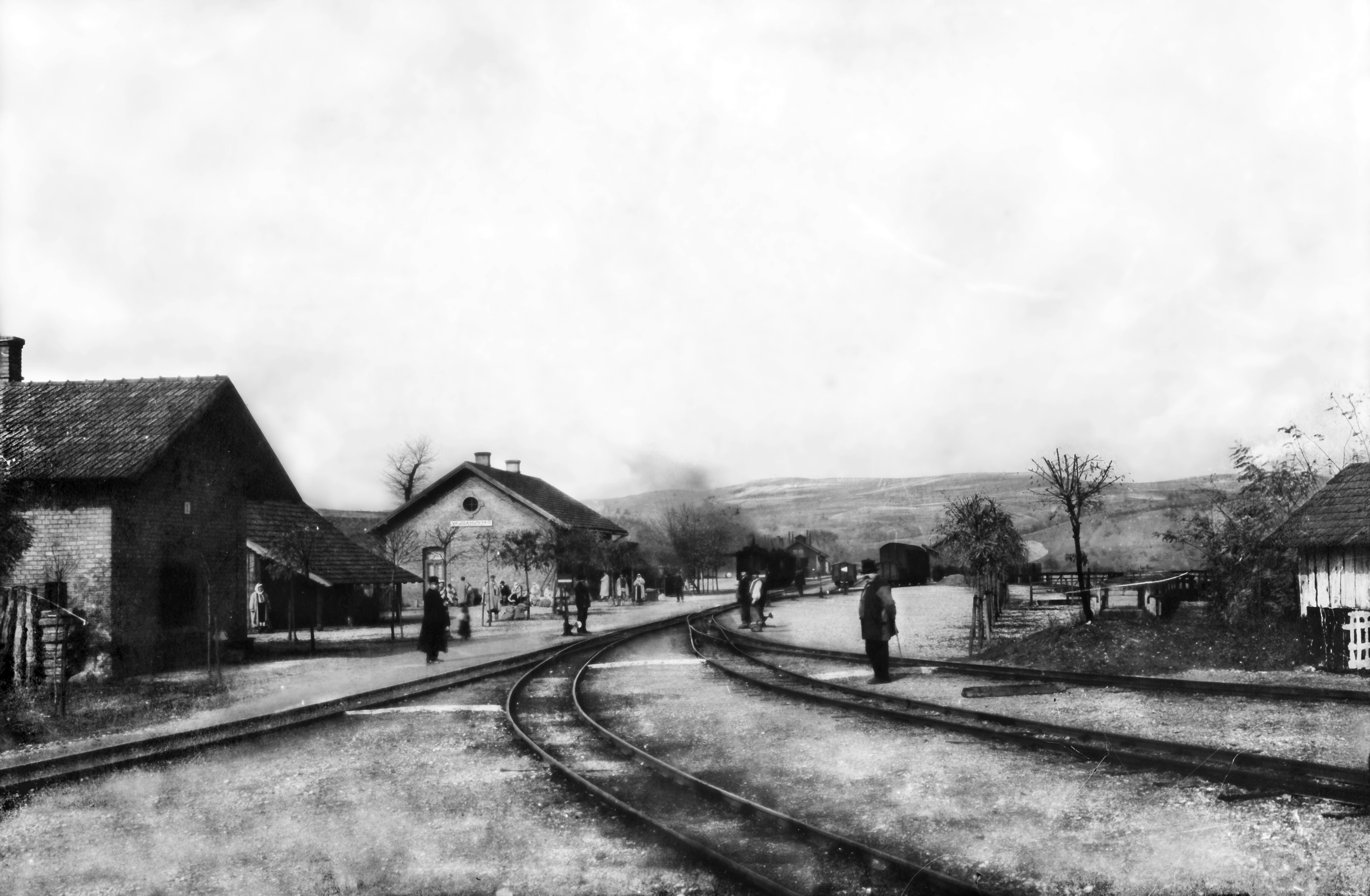
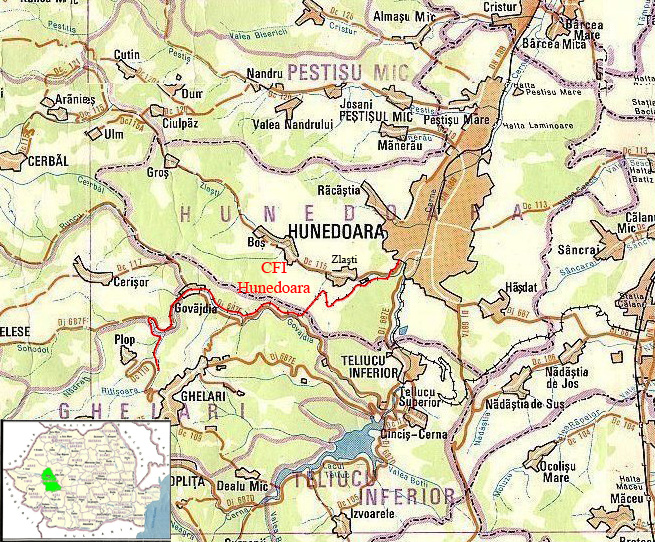
- Hunedoara's West Station in 1905

Technical
- Line length: 16 km (9.9 mi)
- Track gauge: 760 mm (2 ft 5 15/16 in)
- Minimum radius: 40–50 m (131.2–164.0 ft)
- Operating speed: 20 km/h (12 mph) max.
- Maximum incline: 25‰-27‰ or 2.5 %-2.7 %

The Transylvanian Mining Railway was a local interest narrow-gauge (760mm gauge) railway which was the first mining railway in Transylvania. This railway was built to ease the transportation of the iron ore mined from the iron ore mines from Ghelari to the blast furnace in Govăjdia and the ironworks from Hunedoara. This railway was also known as the "Hunedoara-Ghelari Local Interest Railway", "CFI Hunedoara", "Mocănița Hunedoara", "Calea Ferată Minieră Ardeleană", "Erdélyi Bányavasút" in Hungarian. The line was 10 km (6.2 mi) long from Hunedoara to Govăjdia and another 6 km (3.7 mi) from Govăjdia to the Retișoara terminus. This line was used by mixed trains that carried both iron ore and passengers from Ghelari to Govăjdia and Hunedoara's ironworks. They also transported dolomite and limestone from the limestone quarries near Govăjdia to the ironworks.

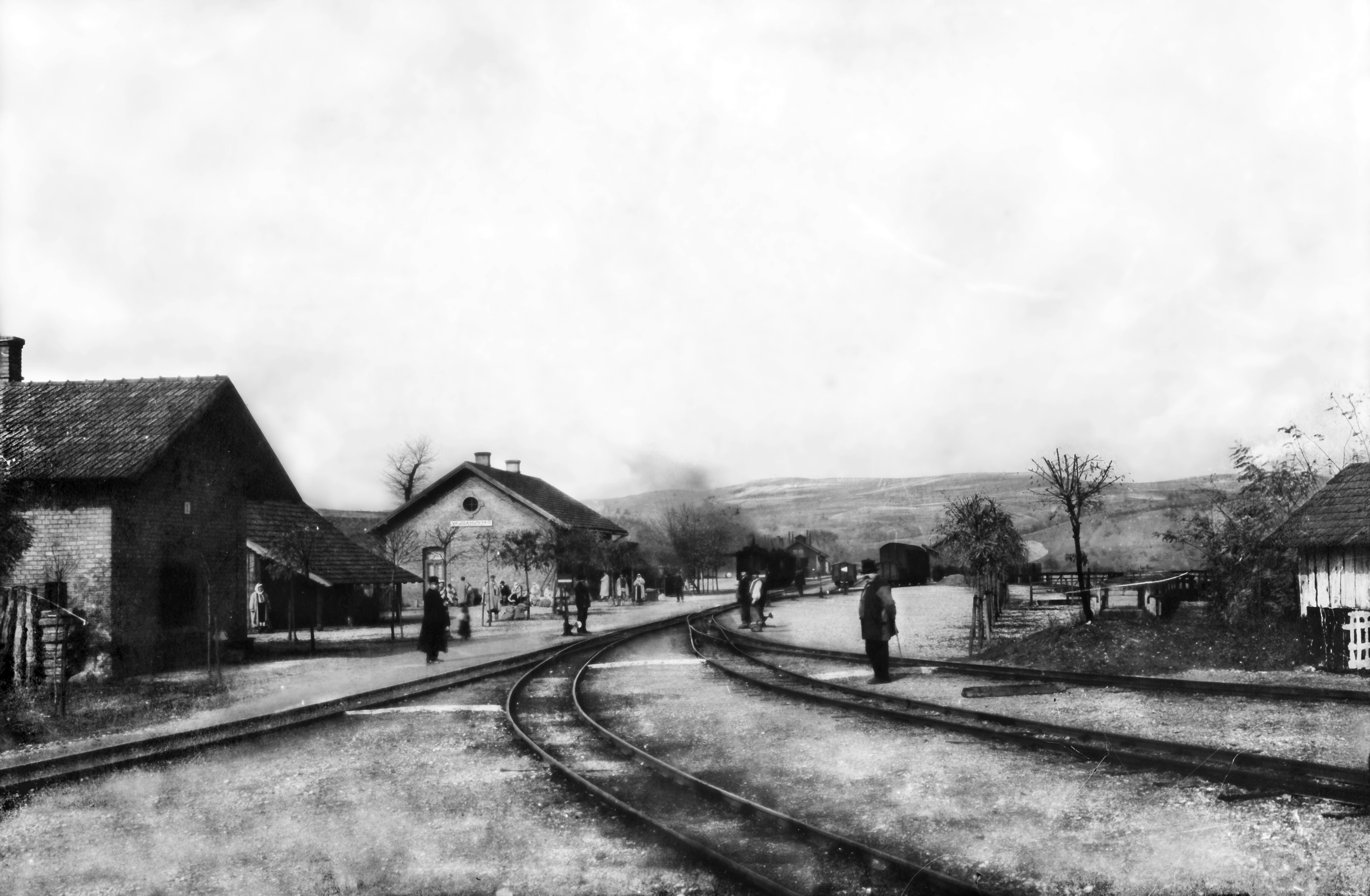
Hunedoara's West Station in 1905

== Line history ==
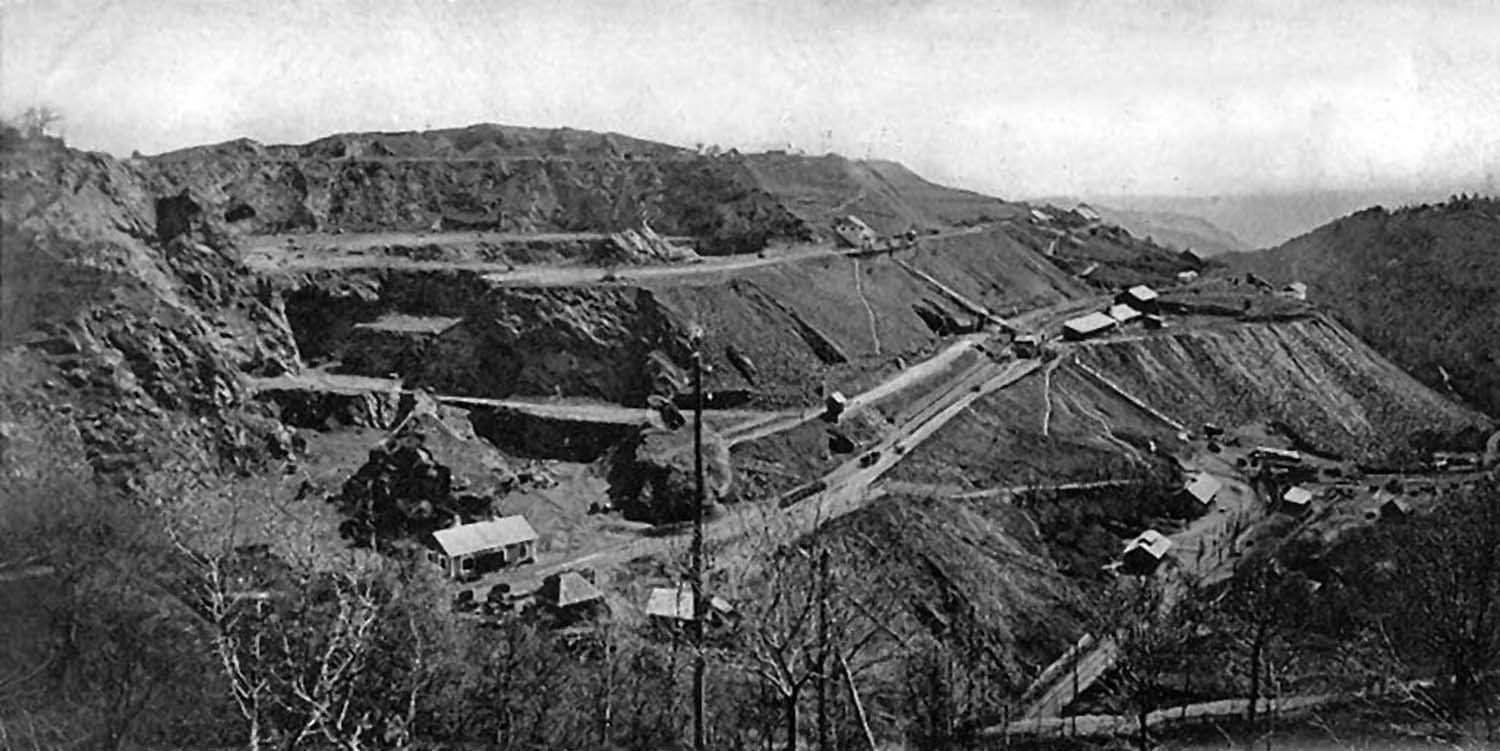
The central iron ore mine in Ghelari 1904

Earlier the iron ore transport from the mines in Ghelari to the chutes and tipplers of the ironworks from Govăjdia was done by horses with two baskets attached on each side or other hired carriers until the demand and the price for the transported iron ore rose in 1859 from 18.6 Fillér/1 quintal to 53.6 Fillér/1 quintal of transported iron ore. Because of the rising expenses for the transportation of iron ore, the administration was forced to replace the transport system.

In 1859 they started digging a 600 m (2,000 ft)-long tunnel from the main mine in Ghelari to Retișoara's valley which was completed in 1866 at a cost of 111,768 Krones and 50 Fillérs. Meanwhile, they built a 790 metres (2,590 feet)-long, 633 mm gauge railway specially for horse-drawn ore cars. At the end of the line they built a 160-metre-long chute where they dumped the iron ore to the Retișoara's valley floor which was 90–100 m (300–330 ft) lower than the level of the tunnel's exit. After the ore was dumped down the chute, the carriers transported the ore to the Govăjdia Blast Furnace which was 4 km (2.5 mi) away.

Thanks to these investments they have managed to lower the prices for the transported ore from 30 Fillérs to 10 Fillérs, but the ironworks from Govăjdia received less iron ore because the transporters came up with new demands which rushed the construction of the railway to the blast furnace in Govăjdia.

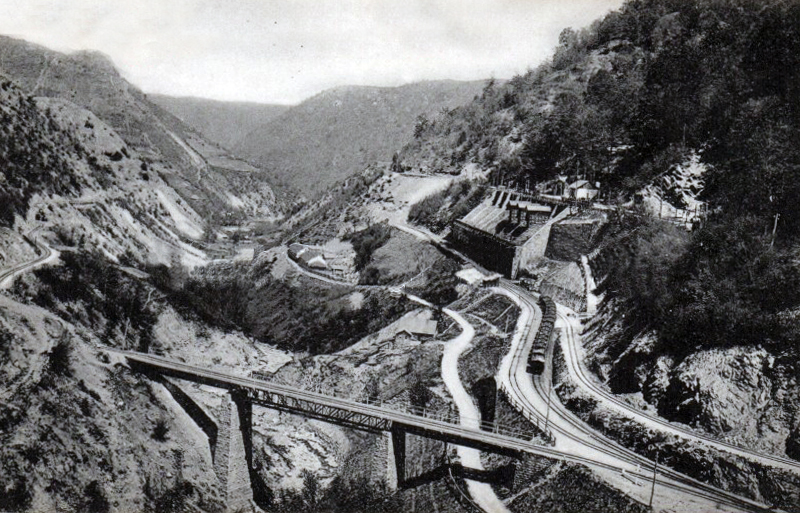
The Retișoara valley viaduct and terminus with the loading bins for the iron ore

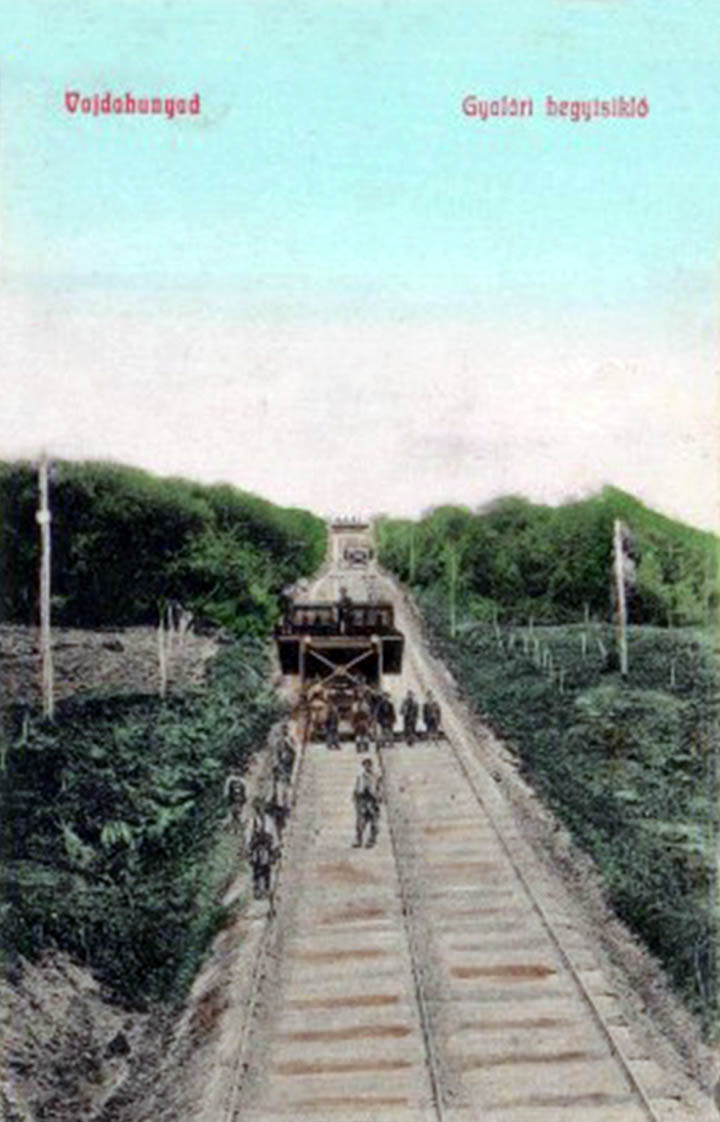
View from the bottom of the inclined plane from Retișoara valley

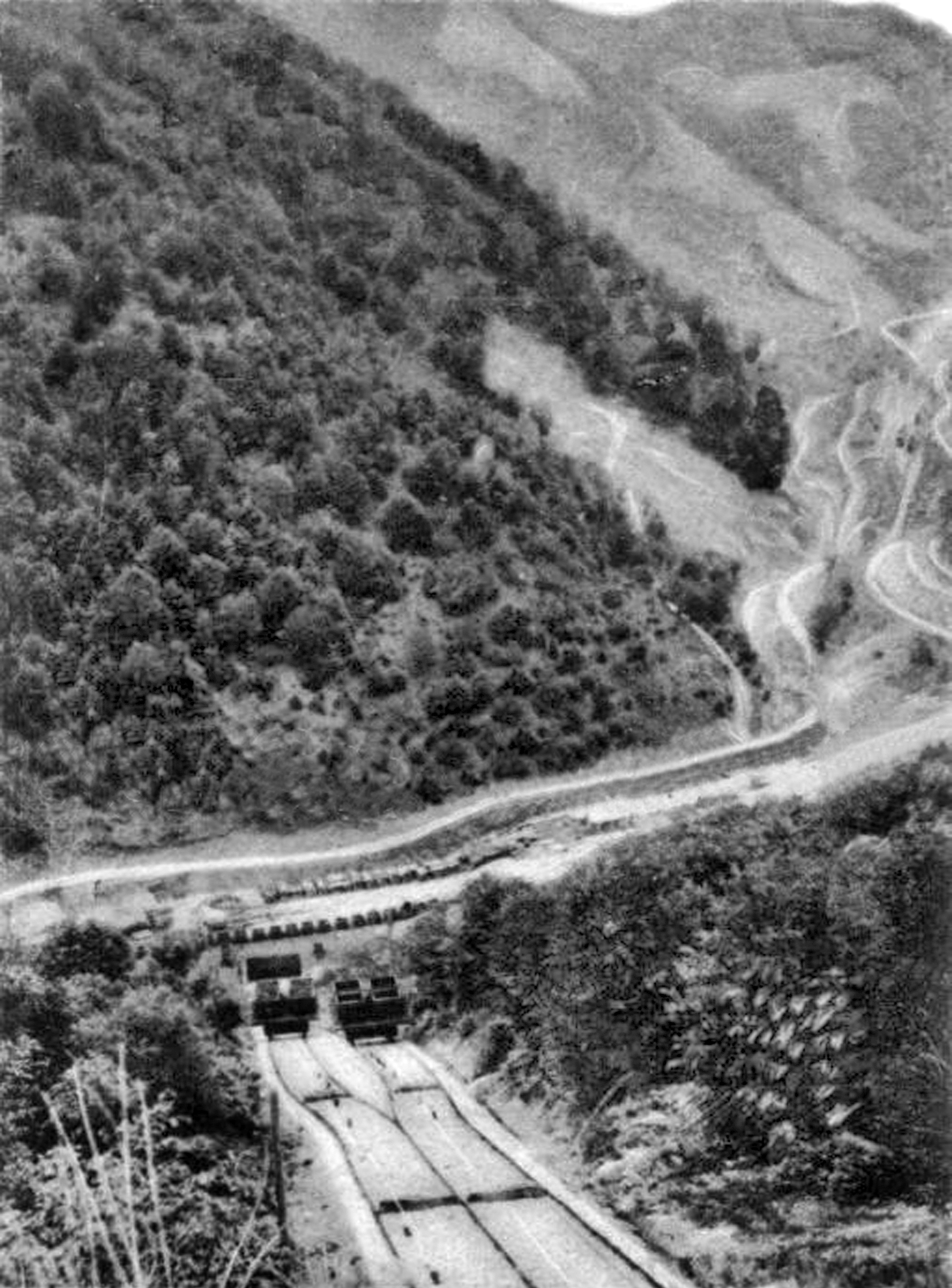
View from the top of the Retișoara valley inclined plane

The altitude difference between the "Lukács László" mining face from the central mine in Ghelari and the throat of the blast furnace in Govăjdia was 260 metres (850 feet); to compensate they built a 5,120-metre-long, 633 mm gauge, divided in three sections by the chutes from Nădrab and Retișoara at a total cost of 20,000 Krones. Later they built two water-driven jaw crushers for the iron ore. The last section of the Retișoara-Govăjdia line was completed in July 1871 and handed over for use. After the opening of the line and chutes, the transported iron ore cost dropped to 7 Fillérs for each quintal of transported iron ore. In 1888 the chutes were replaced by inclined planes (funicular), the first one 140 metres (460 feet) long at Nădrab, and the other 260 metres (850 feet) long at Retișoara.

After the construction of the ironworks at Hunedoara in 1882, the large quantity of iron ore mined from Ghelari could not be transported to Hunedoara by the existing systems. For that, it was necessary to build a separate transport system. Because of economic and geographic problems, they opted for the construction of a ropeway conveyor system. Its construction was completed in 1884, which ensured entirely the ore necessities of the first three blast furnaces from Hunedoara.

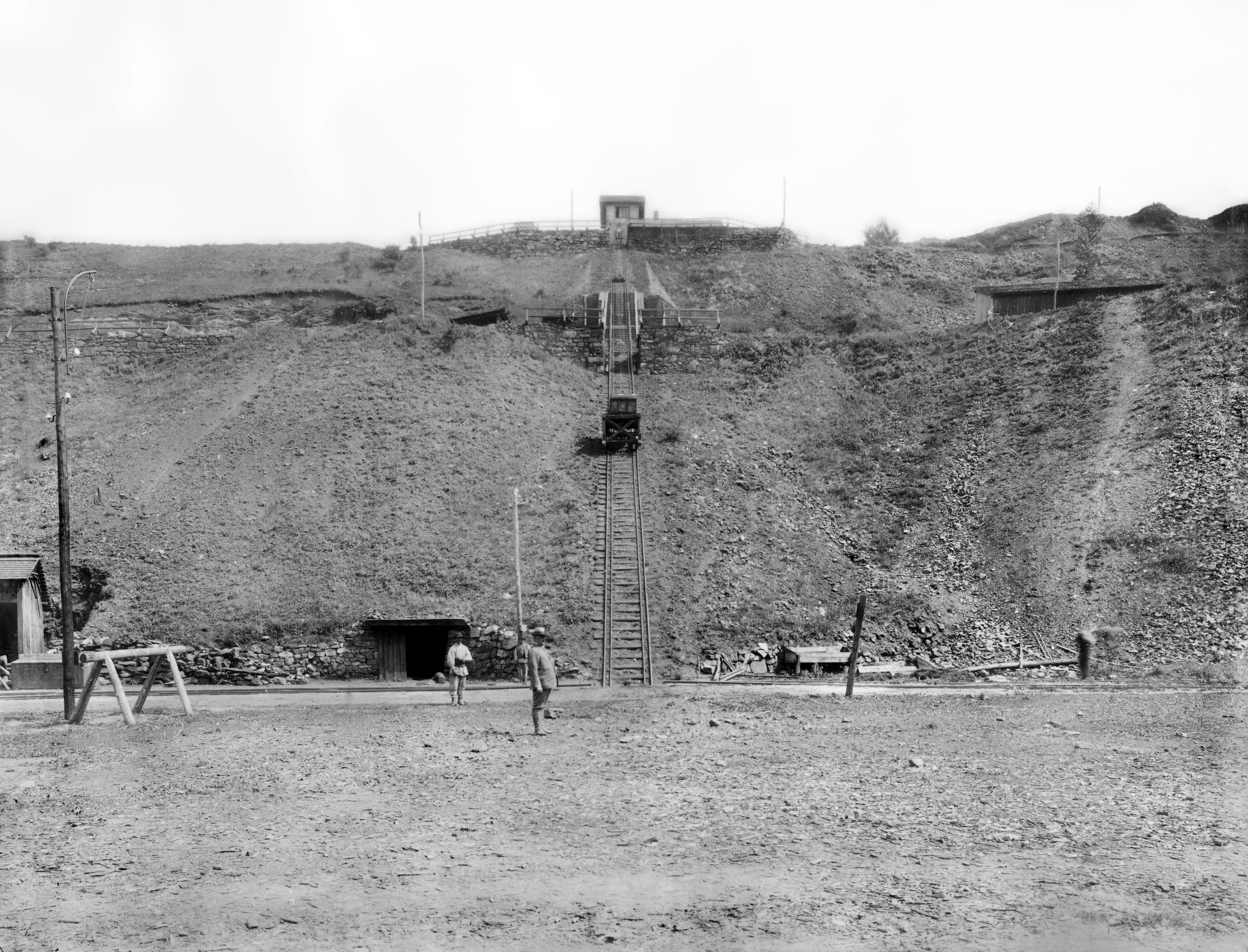
The inclined plane from the central mine in Ghelari. On the left of the inclined plane is the "Kerpely" adit.

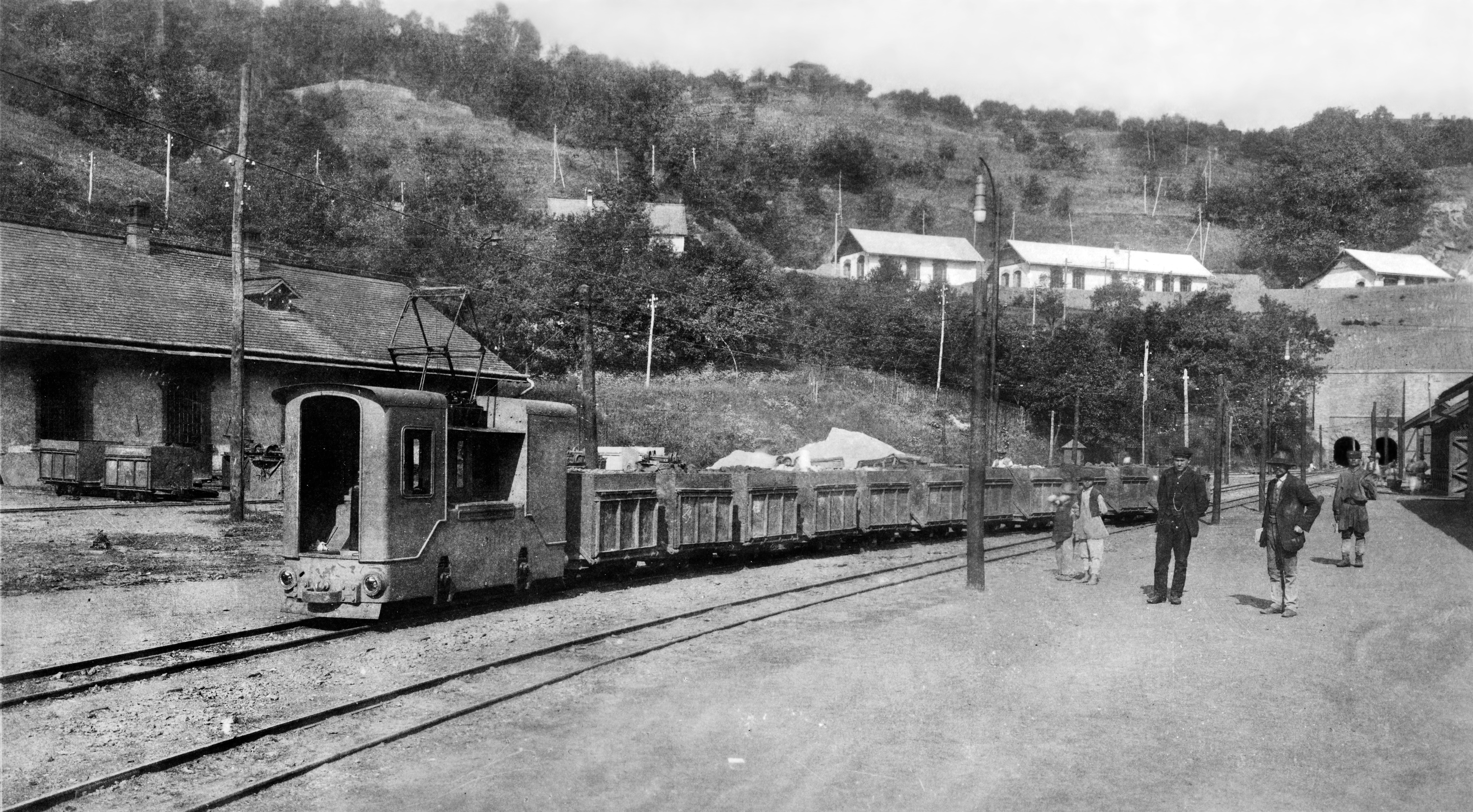
The electrified mine railway and electric train from the "Lukács László" mining face from the central mine of Ghelari

However, after the start of the 4th blast furnace the existing ropeway conveyor system proved to be insufficient in ensuring the iron ore needs for all four blast furnaces, so they decided to build a second ropeway conveyor system between Ghelari and Hunedoara parallel to the existing one.

Considering the high costs of transportation for the iron ore and charcoal to the blast furnaces from Govăjdia and Hunedoara, in 1897 they decided on a radical overhaul of the transport system.

This is how the Transylvanian Mining Railway was built, where at the Retișoara terminus arrived the iron ore mined from the mines of Ghelari, which was then transported to the iron works from Govăjdia and Hunedoara.

The construction of the Transylvanian Mining Railway determined the radical overhaul of the Ghelari central mine's transport system, so it became necessary to descend the entire quantity of mined ore to the "Kerpely" mine face adit which was connected by railway to the "Lukács László" tunnel by extending the adit and the extension of this adit could have been done with modest costs.

The construction of the "Lukács László" tunnel was started in 1898 from two directions and met in the middle in 1899, the tunnel was 504.9 m (1,656 ft) long along with the "Lukács László" adit reached 754 m (2,474 ft). The two entrances of the tunnel were lined with stone, for the rest of the tunnel lining was not necessary because it was passing through solid shale. The tunnel is 20 m (66 ft) lower than the tunnel built in 1863, so because of the incline the water coming from the upper tunnel flowed down to the lower tunnel.

Through the "Lukács László" tunnel from the inclined plane, a 633mm gauge, electrified railway with an incline of 4‰ was built to the "Kerpely" adit where formally a horse-drawn existed and was electrified, also the inclined plane from Retişoara valley was overhauled to lower and raise 4 filled ore cars and 4 empty ore cars on the two platforms. The inclined plane worked by gravity so the weight of the first platform with the filled ore cars descending to the valley floor, pulled up via a cable the platform with the empty ore cars. The iron ore lowered on the inclined plane was forwarded via an 850 metres (2,790 feet)-long electrified (sometimes helped by a steam locomotive) which started from the base of the inclined plane and ended at the Retișoara's terminus where three electrically driven jaw crushers were installed to crush and sort the iron ore into eight class loading bins where they loaded the iron ore into the cars of the train from where the iron ore was transported to the ironworks from Govăjdia and Hunedoara. The trackbed preparation work began in 1888 and in 1897 and 1898 were so advanced, that for the line construction the decision steps were made after the connection of the Ghelari mine railway to the Retișoara inclined plane and after the overhaul of the Retișoara inclined plane, further more the legal occupation of the necessary terrain for the railway has started, the surveying of the trackbed was done successfully between January 9–13, 1899, the ministry of commerce asked for a visit from the government that was held at the Hunedoara town hall on 14 February 1899, the construction authorization was given verbally on the mining company's responsibility. The construction of the railway was started at the beginning of spring, on 4 March 1899 with the ceremonial first hoe stroke. The contract for the construction and usage of the railway was made between three Austrian companies called Gfrerer, Schoch, and Grossmann under the ordinance number 24089 from 15 March 1899 issued by the Hungarian Kingdom's Finance Ministry.

The Transylvanian Mining Railway starts at Hunedoara, passes over the Zlaști valley, and through the 747 m (2,451 ft) tunnel at Cățănaș into Govăjdia valley from where it goes to Retişoara valley that belongs to Ghelari, where it ends at the base of the inclined plane at a total length of 16 km (9.9 mi), with a 760mm gauge built exclusively for steam locomotive usage, the highest incline on the open line was 27‰, in the stations 25‰, the tightest turn radius on the open track was 50 metres, in stations 50 metres. The weight of the steel rails used was 13.75 kg/m (27.7 lb/yd) with usage of jointed tracks that were mounted on ties that were so densely placed so under the 2.5-ton weight exerted by each wheel, would not surpass 1 ton on each cm².

The distance between tracks in the stations measured from the centre was 3 metres, considering the largest with of the rolling stock of 2.2 meters. The ties were trapezoid shaped, made of oak, at a length of 1.5 metres each, 12 cm high, bottom 20 cm wide, top 14 cm wide.

The Transylvanian Mining Railway had four stations, at Hunedoara, Govăjdia, Nădrab, and Retișoara, and four halts: two at Zlaști, one at Cățănaș, and one at Tulea. The Hunedoara's West station was 5,35 metres higher than the upper factory railway leading to the throat of the number 4 blast furnace, and 6,65 above the level of the throat of the number 4 blast furnace. The lines of the station were connected to the factory's upper ore tipplers where the iron ore filled cars were shunted in by a locomotive and emptied. The station was also connected to the charcoal tipplers. Here they also emptied the limestone. The line was also connected via a metal bridge to the earlier mentioned charcoal tipplers where the charcoal transported from the charcoal kilns in the Poiana Ruscă mountains and emptied here. For the transportation of iron ore on regular railway, a transfer station was built to transfer the iron ore from the narrow-gauge ore cars to the regular gauge cars. The exclusively mountain specific, mining railway with the high incline, three tunnels (the longest at 747 meters), with numerous artworks, exquisite metallic bridges, had a positive impact on the development and value of the two ironworks, also helped on the improvement of the image and installations of the ironworks, so it proved to be a real success for the local iron ore mining and the two ironworks.

The construction of the railway was constructed on the mining company's own expense, until 1906 the construction and conversion to a local interest railway cost 3,655,000 krones, and another 300,000 krones calculated for a 30-year usage after the opening, so the railway is passed freely into the property and administration of the state Treasury.

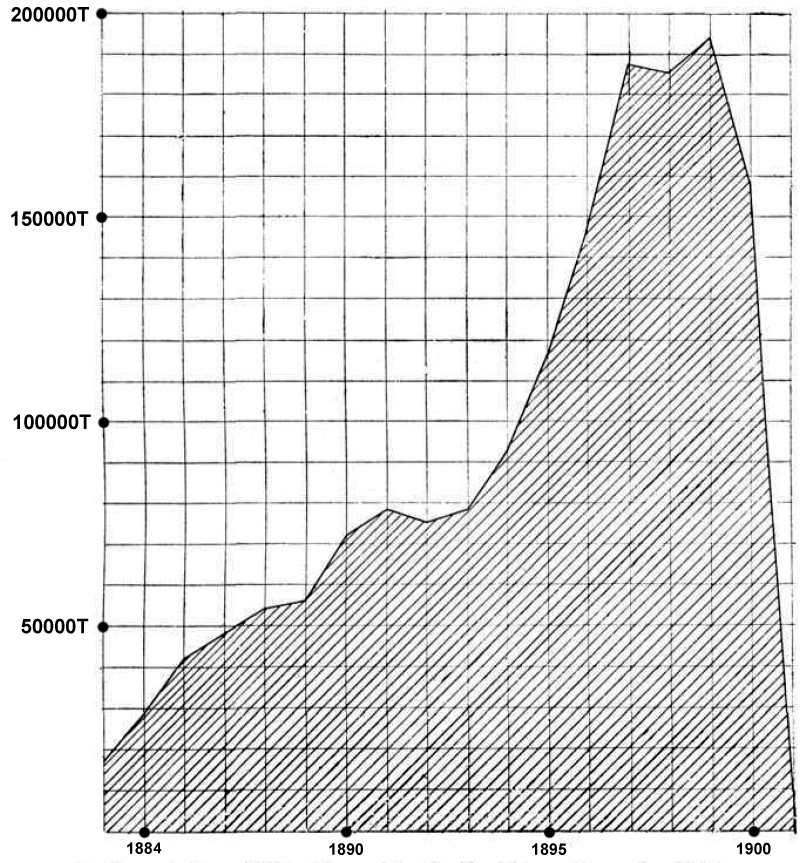
The diagram showing the quantity of transported iron ore via the ropeway conveyor system from Ghelari to Hunedoara, 1883–1901

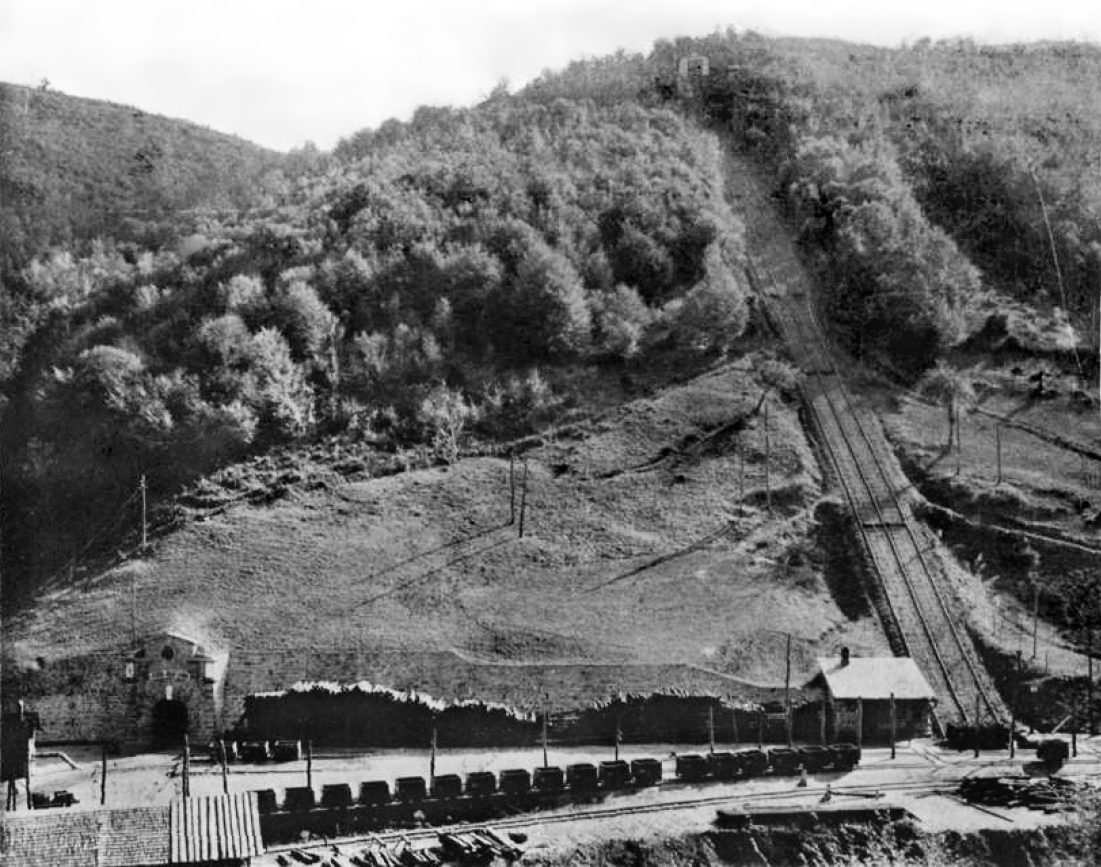
The "Ferencz József" adit and the inclined plane from Retişoara valley

On the railway they were compelled to transport to Hunedoara at least 180,000 tonnes of ore yearly (to Govăjdia 20,000 tonnes of ore yearly at a cost of 60–140 Fillér per ton), and also around 9,000 tonnes of other materials and blast furnace products from Govăjdia yearly towards Hunedoara at a unitary price of 1,2 Fillér, in case of higher traffic the transport costs would be lowered accordingly.

The notes gathered by the Hungarian Kingdom's ministry of commerce at the time of visit of the government, were approved under the ordinance number 14230 on 27 April 1899, in the meantime the construction authorization was finally given. The mining railway was finalized under 19 months according to the construction contract. The inspection of the line was done on 29 September 1900 and handed over for use. In the second half of November 1900 the first test transport was also done to the contract accordingly when the line's transport simplification capacity was proven.

The above-mentioned installations were put in use and handed over for traffic in the autumn of 1900. On the Transylvanian mining railway from the opening, the following iron ore quantity was transported:

- 1900 – 20,380.8 T
- 1901 – 188,920.2 T
- 1902 – 206,507.2 T
- 1903 – 204,323.3 T
- 1904 – 184,302.9 T
- 1905 – 169,076.4 T

This railway was operated non-stop through the two world wars as a local interest railway with mixed trains. In the 1950s the original locomotives were replaced by 11 steam locomotives built at Reșița. The loco shed at Govăjdia was demolished and a new loco shed at Hunedoara was built on a hill near the Corvin Castle. The original West-station building at Hunedoara was demolished and a new station building was built, the tracks were realigned and a delta junction was constructed around the station building, where they rotated the locomotives without a turn table. Hunedoara's west station was the first station in Europe where the locomotives could circle around the station building. The terminus at Retișoara along with the last three km of railway were closed in the early 1970s, after a different tunnel was constructed in the mid-1960s between the underground mines from Ghelari and the iron ore processing plant from Teliucu Inferior. In 1967 a dolomite and talc quarry was opened at Crăciuneasa hamlet near Govăjdia, in the same time the terminus was built at Crăciuneasa called "Stația Finală" which was located at 13 km (8.1 mi) from Hunedoara. From here they transported dolomite, limestone, and talc to the limeworks from Zlaști and to the Hunedoara steel works.

In 1976 the entire line received major overhaul by replacing the 14 kg/m rails in to 40 kg/m type rails that were produced in Reșița. In the late 1970s-early 1980s the old Reşiţa steam locomotives were replaced by five 450 horsepower "Bo-BoDh" type "L45H" class diesel-hydraulic, locomotives; and one L35H class hydraulic locomotive, that were produced by the "Faur" factories from Bucharest. The original 7 ton capacity ore cars were replaced by "K" type hopper cars with capacities between 20–20 tons each with four axles mounted on two bogies. One Reşiţa steam locomotive number 12F was transformed into a mobile heating unit for passenger cars in winters. In 1990 the passenger service ceased, meantime at the loco shed worked around 120 employees in three shifts which were conductors, mechanics, drivers, track maintenance, etc. They coupled to the trains tourist cars on demand. The original Zlaşti valley viaduct was replaced in the summer of 1992 to support greater loads. On the 13 km long segment they transported dolomite, talc and limestone to the limeworks from Zlaşti and the steelworks in Hunedoara until 2000.

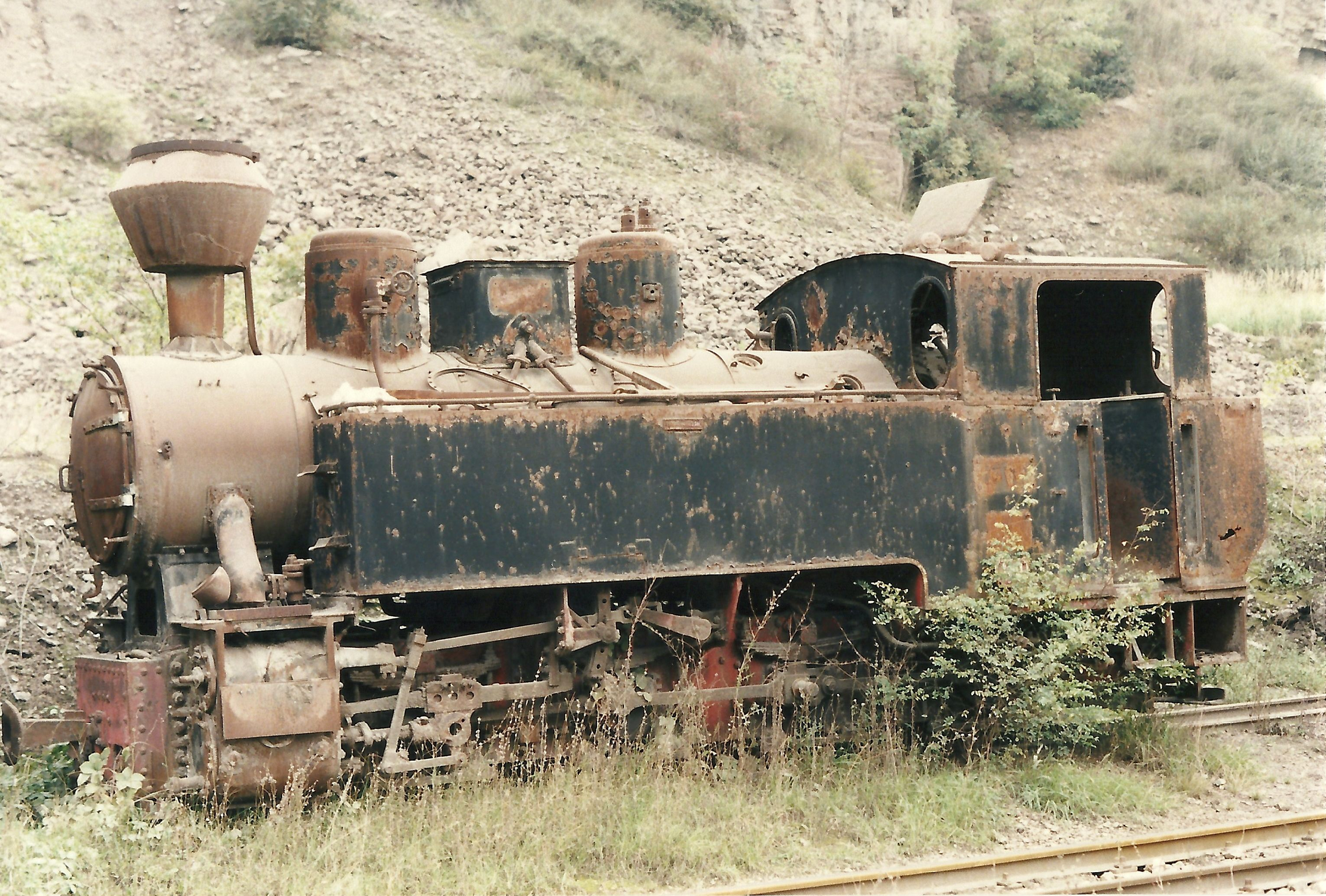
A 150-horsepower steam locomotive produced in Reșița (Photo: Oliver Wileczelek, 26 Sept. 1995)

In 2000 the Austrian company who built the line sent a letter to the management who owned the limeworks from Zlaști and operated this railway, that the 100-year warranty of the bridges was expiring, and it's necessary for an inspection for all of the bridges. After this letter, in 2001 the management of the limeworks decided to remove and scrap 11 km of line between Crăciuneasa terminus and the Zlaști limeworks, not considering the touristic and historical value. They scrapped the bridges, but on the perseverance of the villagers they left one original bridge at Govăjdia for pedestrian use. Meanwhile, they scrapped some of the old rolling stock and locomotives, and some of the rolling stock was saved and exported. The last three bridges and the last 2.3 km long segment operated until October 2008 for transportation of limestone from the improvised loading station made in the former West-Station of Hunedoara, until the limeworks at Zlaști. In the summer of 2009 due to economical reasons the management of the limeworks decided to scrap the last 2.3 km segment of railway. The scrapping began on 19 June 2009 with the scrapping of the second curved bridge from Canton 1 Zlaști. On 6 July 2009 they started the removal and scrapping of the railway. Some of the rails were recovered and sold as second-hand rails for other railways. The last two L45H class diesel-hydraulic locos and the last ten "K" type hopper cars were transported to Crișcior for restoration and further use. The first curved bridge's segments were transported to Crișcior in February 2010 for restoration and use on the forestry line in Moldovița.

== The tunnels ==
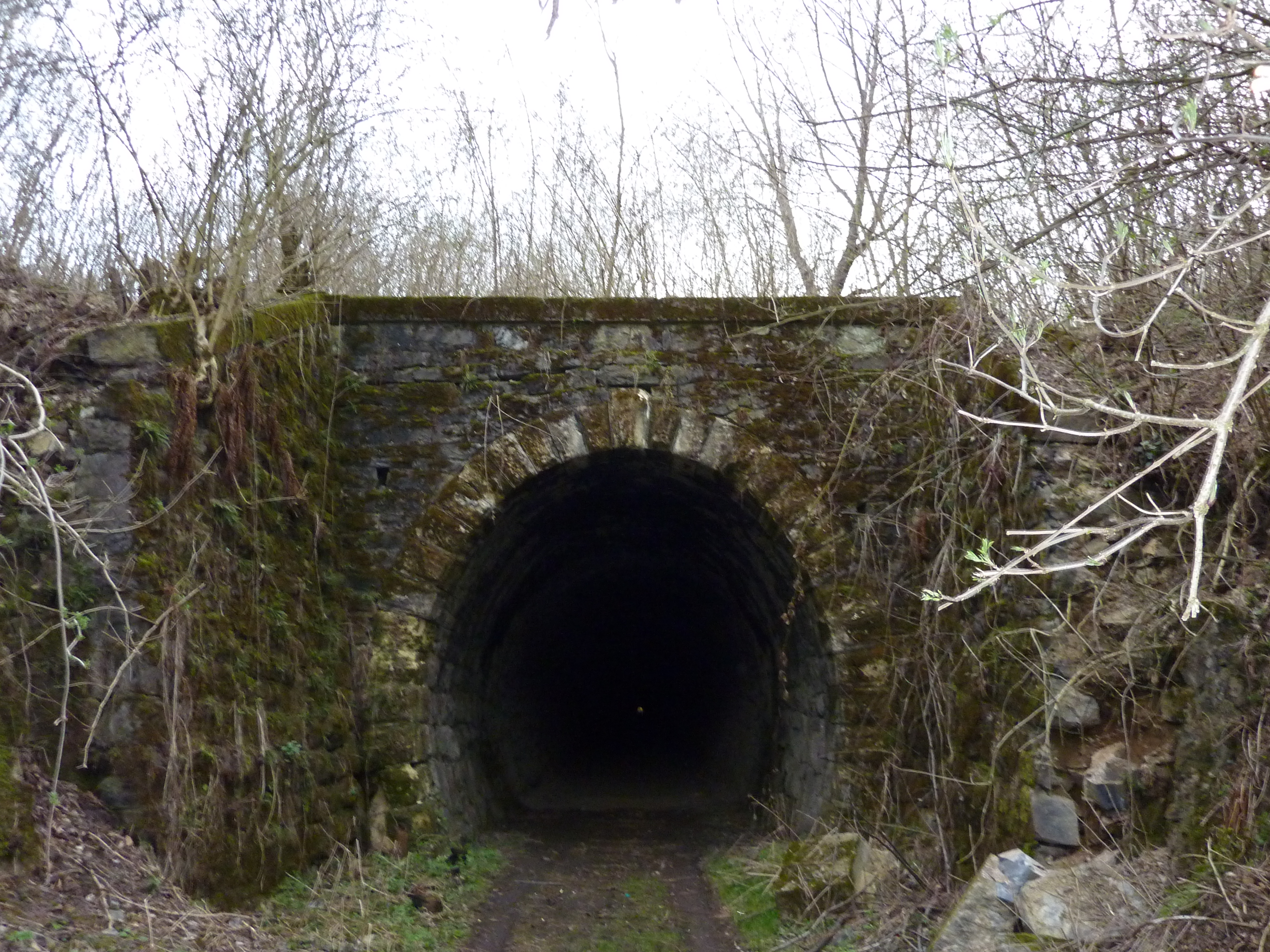
The 747 m tunnel's north entrance from Zlaști

There are three tunnels on the line:

- The first tunnel is at 5 km from Hunedoara, it is a 747 m (2,451 ft) long straight tunnel. The construction of this tunnel started in 1888 and lasted 12 years. The tunnel was designed by two Italian engineer brothers. The digging of the tunnel was started by two teams on both sides of the mountain and meeting in the middle in 1894. The finishing work lasted another six years until the line opening in 1900. The tunnel is passing through solid limestone uniting the Zlaști valley to Govăjdia valley, with a maximum incline of 27‰ from Zlaști. The entrances and some sections of the tunnel's inside were lined with stone, other sections had the sidewalls lined with concrete with the ceilings lined with brick. Some sections of the tunnel have bare rock walls where reinforcement was not necessary. There are sections in the tunnel where groundwater is seeping in. Inside the tunnel at every 50 metres in the left wall they constructed alcoves for people caught in the tunnel when the train was coming.

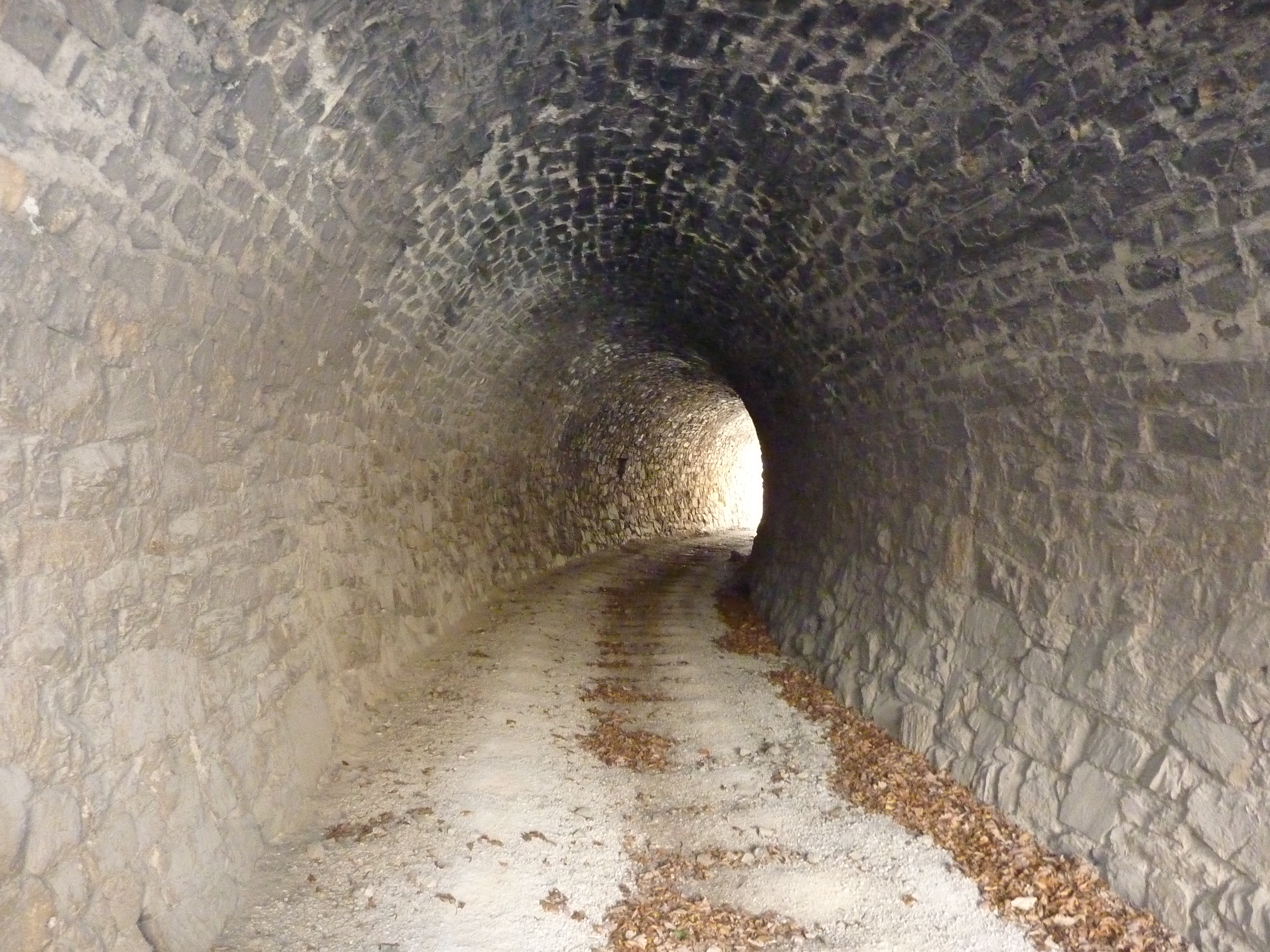
The inside of the 42 metre long curved tunnel from Tulea, Govăjdia

A local company removed and scrapped the tracks after 2001. Today the tunnel is in excellent condition, it is open and can be traversed by bicycle, on foot or by motorized all-terrain vehicles serving as a shortcut from to Govăjdia.

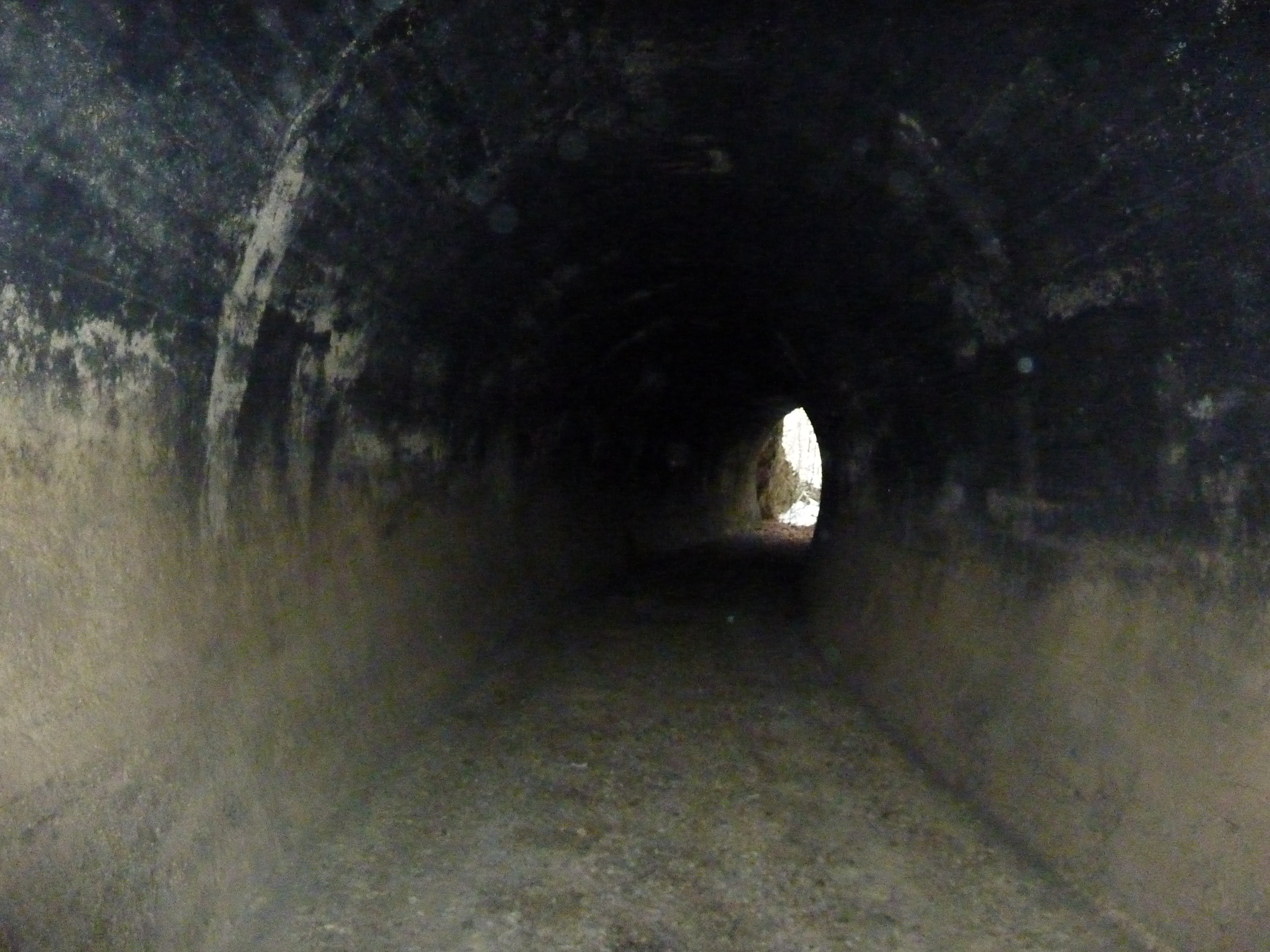
The 44 m long curved tunnel from Nădrab, Govăjdia

- The second tunnel is at 8 km from Hunedoara at Tulea hamlet from Govăjdia. It is a 42-metre-long curved tunnel serving as a passing through a crest of the mountain. This tunnel is also lined with stone, on the keystone of the tunnel's east portal the date can be seen "1900.12.4". Same as the 747 m tunnel they removed scrapped the tracks after 2001. The tunnel is in excellent condition; it can be passed only by pedestrians. It cannot be passed through by bicycle or motorized land vehicles because of the dense vegetation.
- The third tunnel is passing through a crest of the mountain located at km 13+520 from Hunedoara, at the confluences of Nădrab and Retișoara rivers. It is a 44-metre-long curved tunnel which has an inside lined with concrete, and the ceiling has traces of soot from the early steam locomotives. The tracks here were removed and scrapped in the early 1990s, after the Retișoara terminus was closed in the 1970s. The west portal of this tunnel and a section of the trackbed is buried under the spoil dump which came from the quarry dolomite and talc from Crăciuneasa hamlet. The tunnel can be approached only on foot.

== The bridges ==
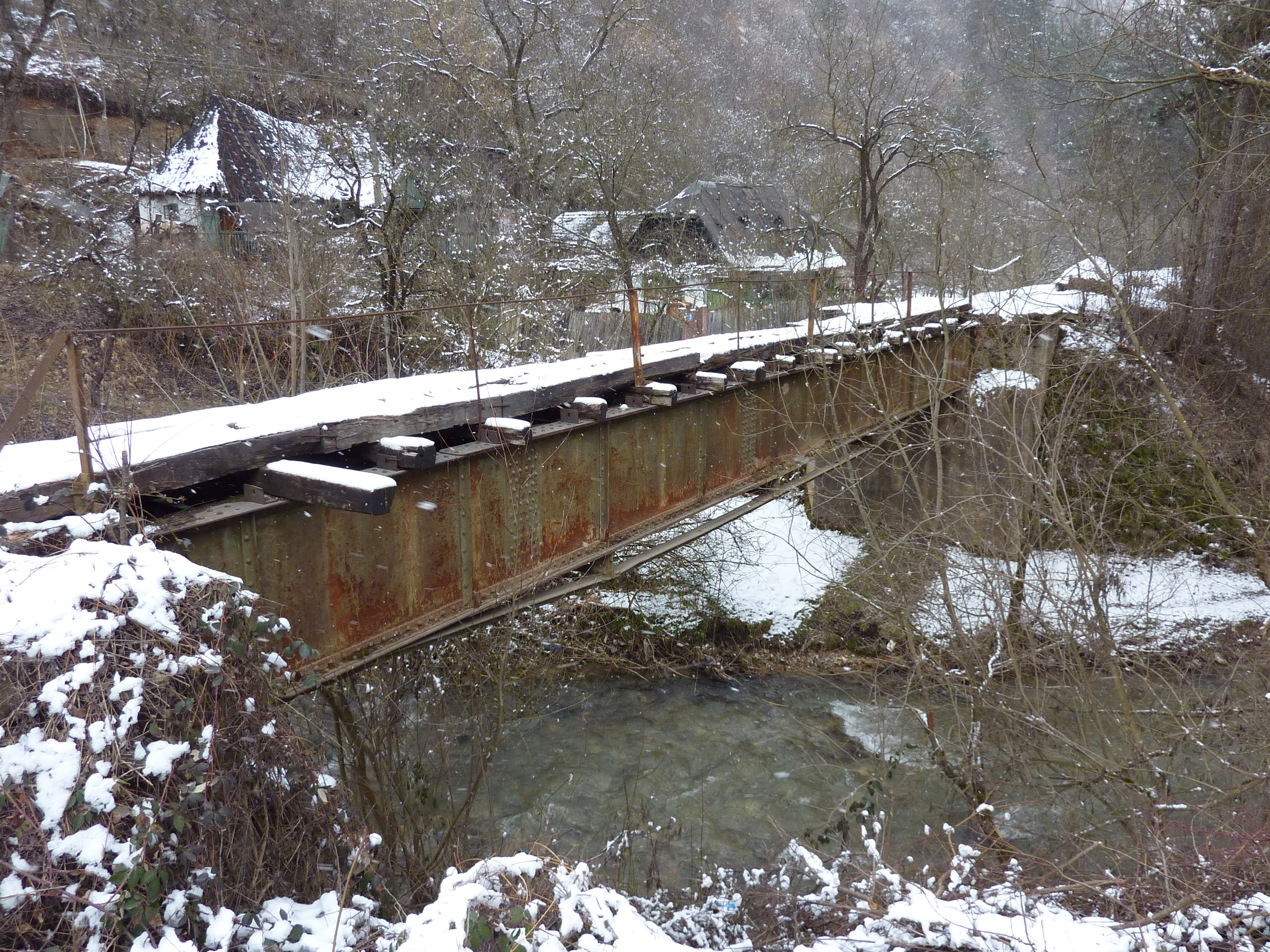
The last original metallic bridge from 1900 which was saved from scrapping by the villagers from Govăjdia

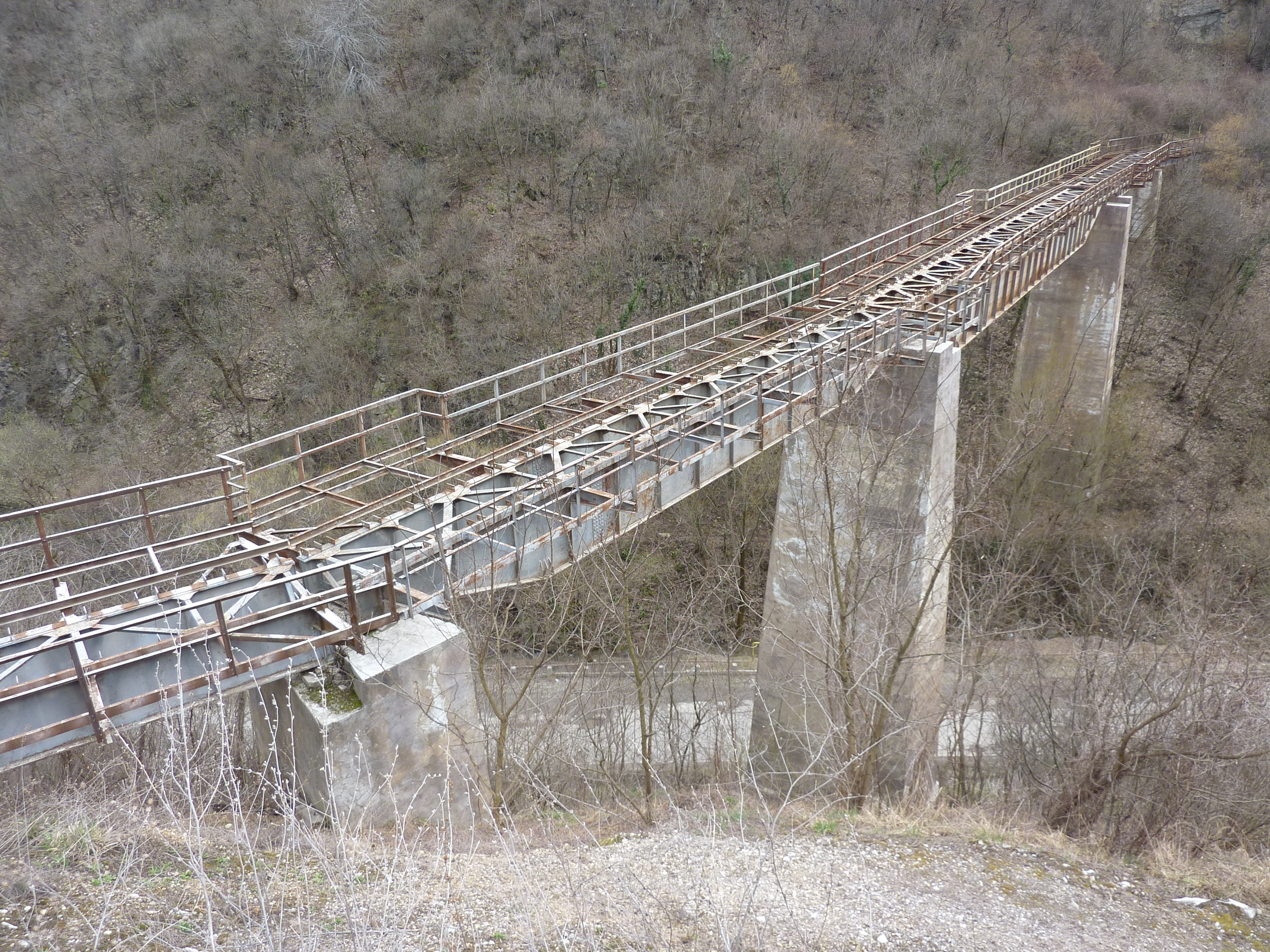
The 114 meter long viaduct's metal frame over the Zlaști valley

On the Transylvanian Mining Railway before 1900 were mounted 16 riveted metallic bridges, of which six were viaducts. The rest were between 3 and 15 meters in length over different obstacles (gorges, rivers, trenches). The two viaducts from the Retișoara valley were scrapped in the early 1990s. The rest of the bridges and viaducts were scrapped between 2001 and 2003, leaving the first and second curved bridges and the 114 long, S-shaped viaduct over the Zlaști valley, which was completely replaced in the summer of 1992. On 19 June 2009 the management of the Zlaști limeworks for economic reasons decided to scrap the second curved bridge near Canton 1 Zlaști. The first curved bridge was uninstalled in February 2010 and sold to an Austrian manager who is settled to Brad, Hunedoara County has a workshop at Crișcior, Hunedoara County and is specialized in restoring narrow-gauge rolling sock and infrastructure. Today the Zlaști valley viaduct, the original metallic bridge from Govăjdia and the pillars and abutments of the former bridges remain.

== Locomotives and rolling stock ==
On the railway since the line opening ran Hungarian MÁVAG 51 class steam locomotives which were replaced in the 1950s by eleven Reșița type, 150 horsepower steam locomotives. Between the late 1970s and mid-1980s the Reșița steam locomotives were replaced by five L45H class, 450 horsepower diesel-hydraulic locomotives that were produced in the Faur (23 August) factories in Bucharest.

9	0-8-0T	Reșița	1330	1957	Der
12F	0-8-0T	Reșița	1019	1952	Der
13	0-8-0T	Reșița	1331	1957	Der
14	0-8-0T	Reșița	1332	1957	Der
01	0-6-0D	Faur	24601	1982	OOU
L45H-069	Bo-BoDH	Faur	23126	1976	
L45H-070	Bo-BoDH	Faur	23125	1976	
L45H-071	Bo-BoDH	Faur	23127	1976	
L45H-072	Bo-BoDH	Faur	23128	1976	
L45H-084	Bo-BoDH	Faur	24973	1985	

The first hopper cars had a 7-ton capacity each, ran on two axles with manual actuated braking systems. The old hopper cars were replaced in the early 1980s with 20 ton and 22 ton capacity "K" type hopper cars, that ran on four axles mounted in two bogies, the cars had pneumatic braking systems, only the unloading mechanism was actuated manually. The first passenger cars were brought from Hungary, that were replaced in the early 1960s with passenger cars brought from the Unio factory from Satu Mare. In 2001 they scrapped some of the extra rolling stock, along with the old steam locomotives, hopper cars and passenger cars. Some locomotives and rolling stock were sold to serve on other narrow-gauge lines from Romania or abroad. The last two L45H class locomotives and the last ten "K" type hopper cars were used until the autumn of 2008 for transportation of limestone from the improvised loading station at Hunedoara West-Station to the limeworks from Zlaşti. In the autumn of 2009 the last two locomotives and hopper cars were transported to the central workshops at Crișcior for restoration and further use on other railways.

== Current state ==
When the scrapping of the last section of the railway had begun in the summer of 2009, a group representing the youth in Hunedoara started protesting against the destruction but they were ignored by the local authorities and the limeworks management and the scrapping was continued until no track was left. The group have not given up, and persevered on protesting. They have created webpages where this line was promoted on the internet using photographs from when the railway was working. They continue insisting on the authorities that this railway if rebuilt will help on the development of tourism near Hunedoara. The line could be included in a tourist circle starting from the Corvin Castle. The line could also be rebuilt by European Union funds for tourism infrastructure.

In the summer of 2010 a committee from the culture ministry was sent to inspect what could be saved and classed urgently as a historical monument. This status was accorded on 22 July 2010 temporarily for one year for what is left of this railway. Under this period the local authorities were compelled to produce the necessary documents for this line to receive the permanent historical monument status.

On 2 April 2011 a group of around 200 young volunteers decided to clear the vegetation off the trackbed. To this volunteering action participated the boy scouts from Ghelari with their leaders, the volunteers from the "Prietenii Mocăniței" associaţion from Sibiu and some students from a university from Cluj-Napoca. They wanted to demonstrate to the local authorities that this line needs to be rebuilt and everyone wants this line to work again.

In the summer of 2011 the temporary historic monument status had expired since the local authorities failed to produce the necessary documents.

The local authorities promised that they are going to start the procedure for the reconstruction of the railway, but for now they are only promises. The youth of Hunedoara continues to fight for the reconstruction of the railway. Today the trackbed, the viaduct's frame over the Zlaști valley, the original bridge in Govăjdia, the three tunnels, the derelict locoshed and the remains of the bridges can be visited.

On 31 May 2013 the Hunedoara county council gave a positive vote for the takeover of the Zlaști valley viaduct which was owned by a local company and decided to donate-it to the county council so it could be used for the accessing of EU funds for the reconstruction of the railway. Further negotiations are carried out for the takeover of the trackbed and annexes from another company that owns them.

== Picture gallery ==
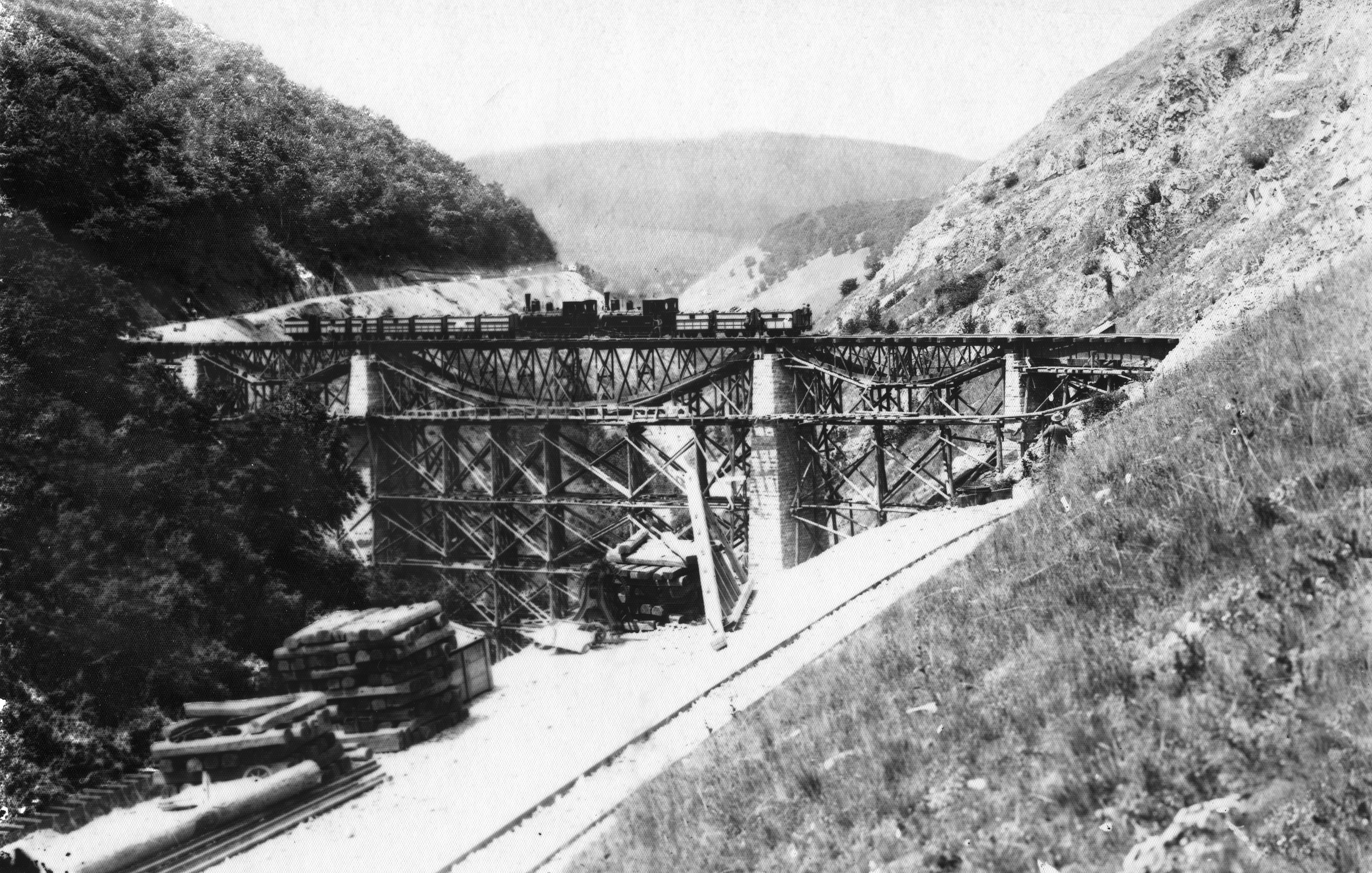
The Zlaști valley viaduct under construction when they performed load trials (August 1900)

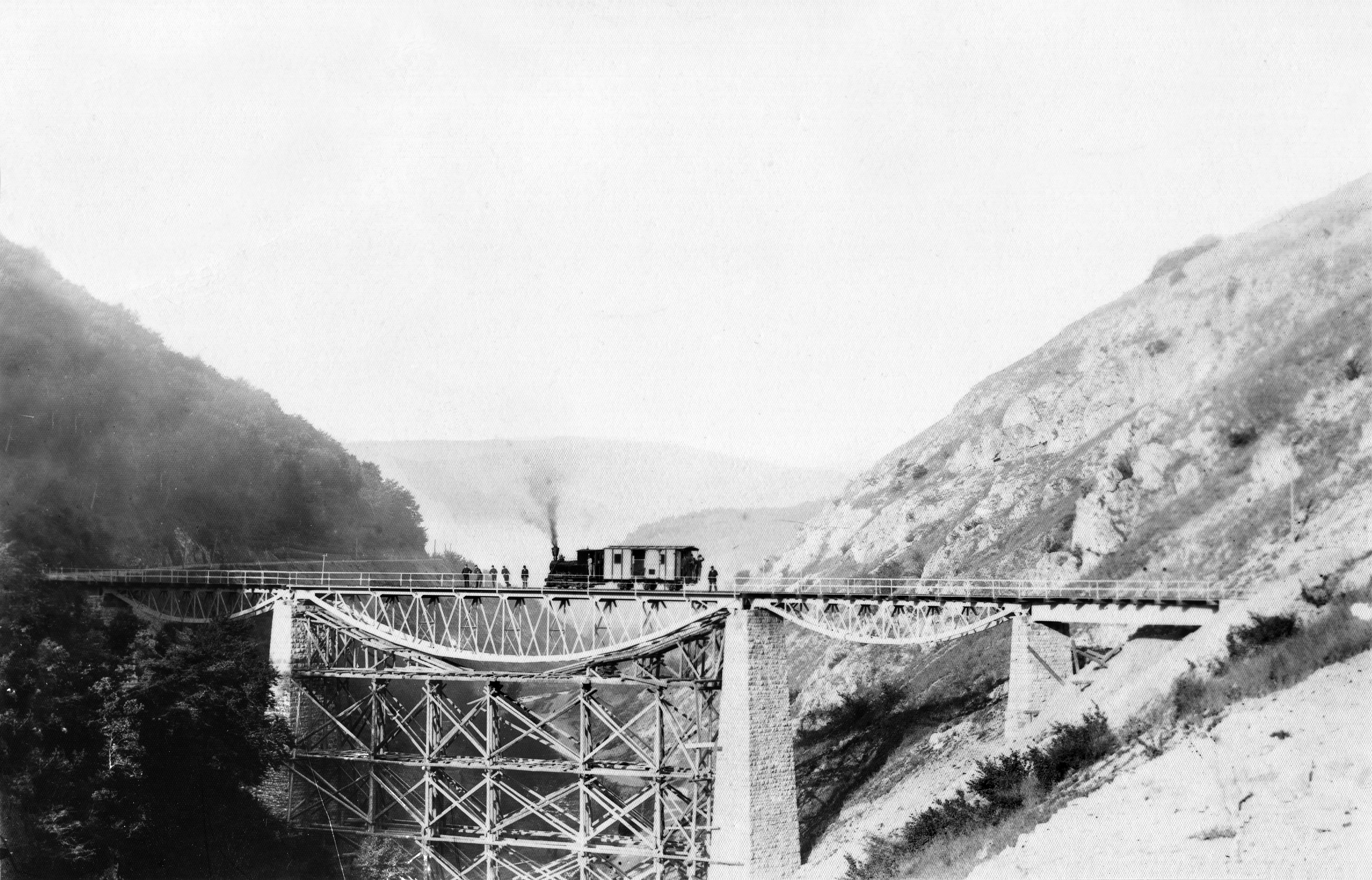
The Zlaști valley viaduct after completion (September 1900)

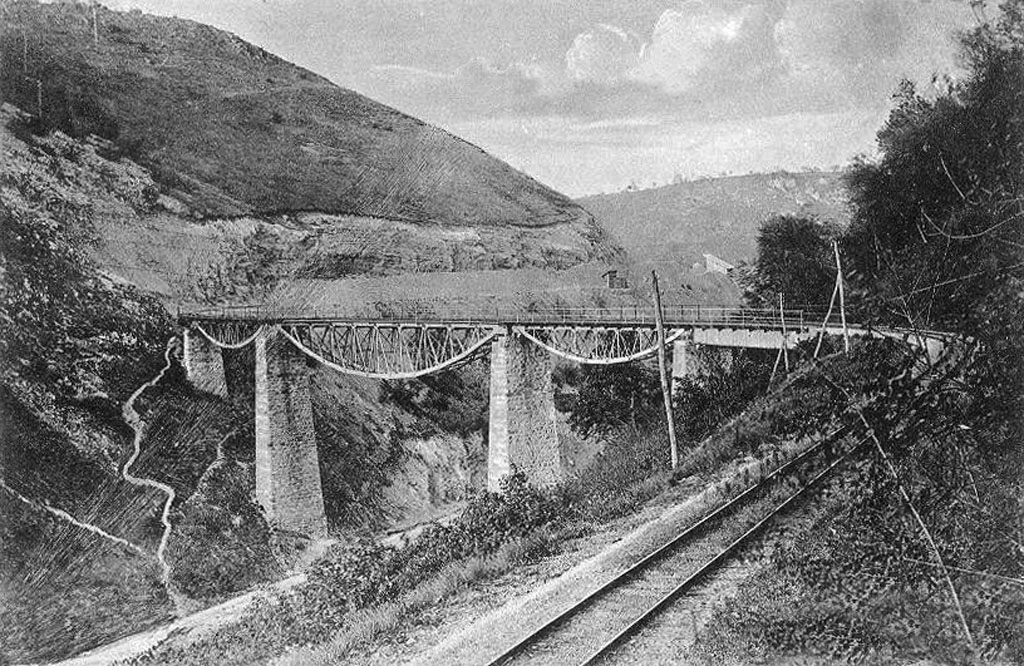
The Zlaști valley viaduct after completion (1904)

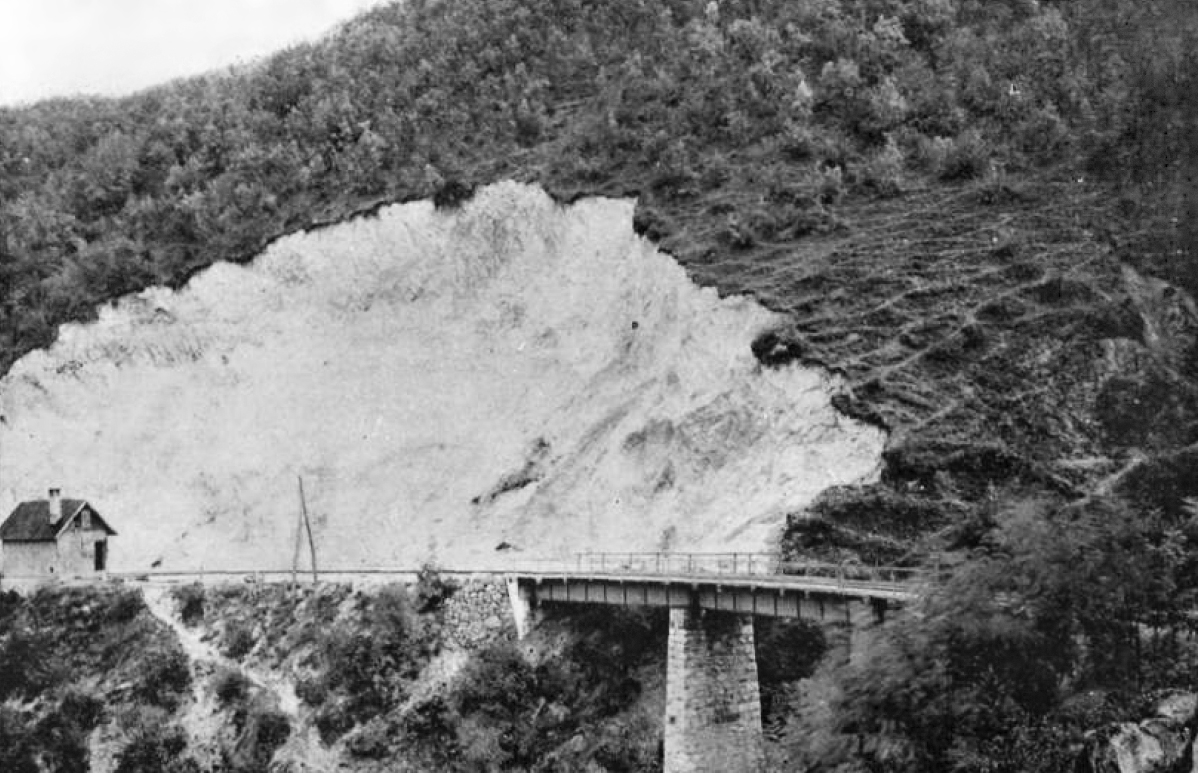
The curved bridge at Canton 1 Zlaști (1905)

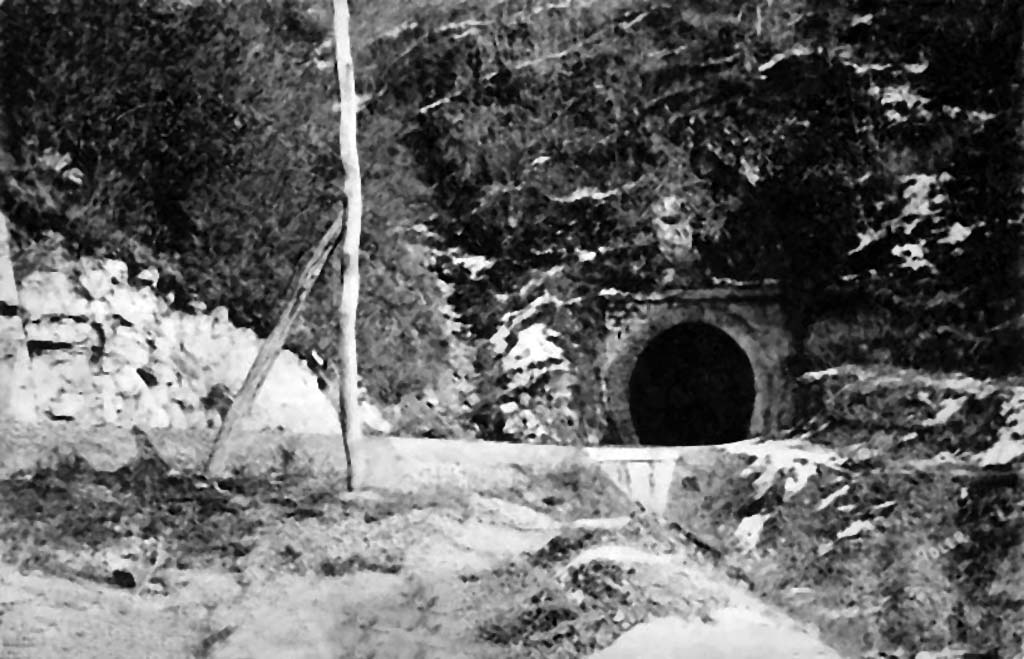
The 747 meter tunnel's Govăjdia side (1904)

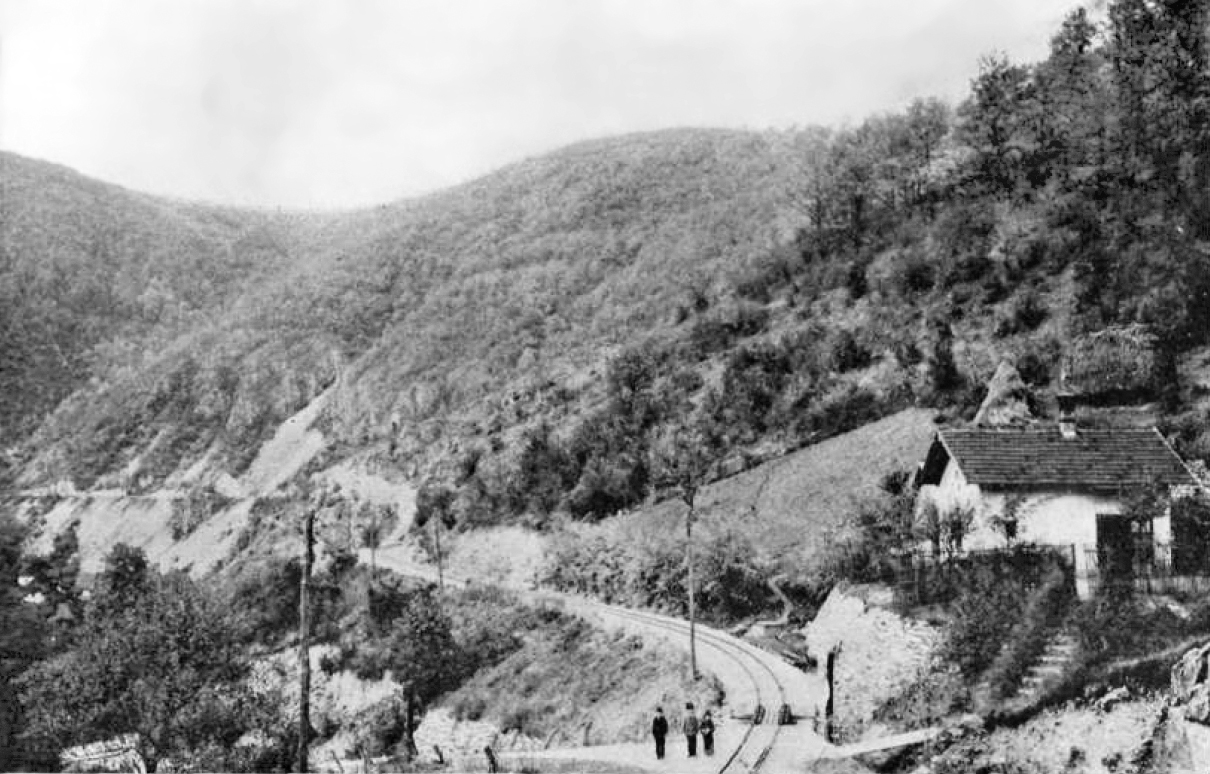
Canton 3, Cățănaș halt (1905)

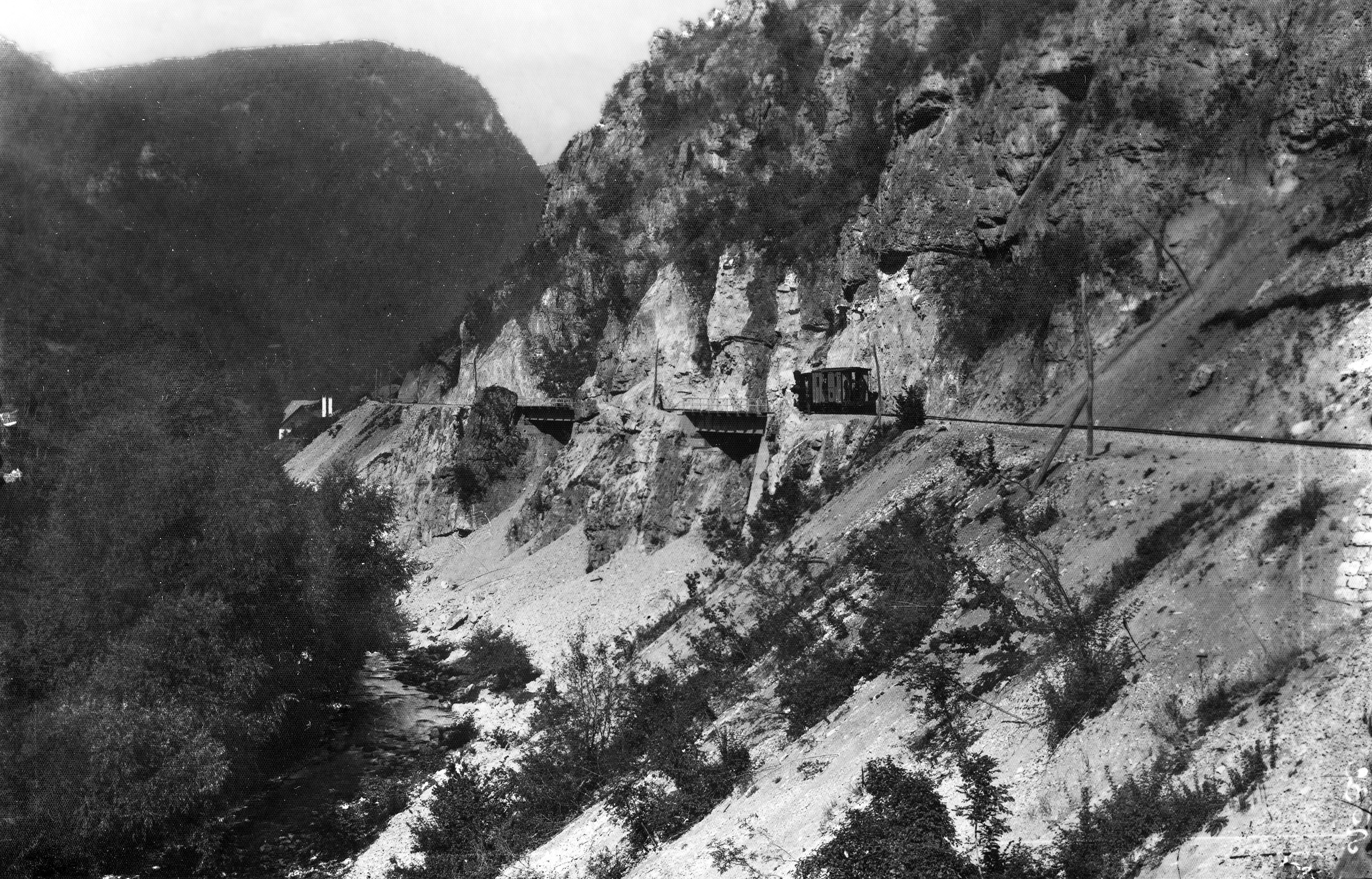
The three bridges near Tulea, Govăjdia (September 1900)

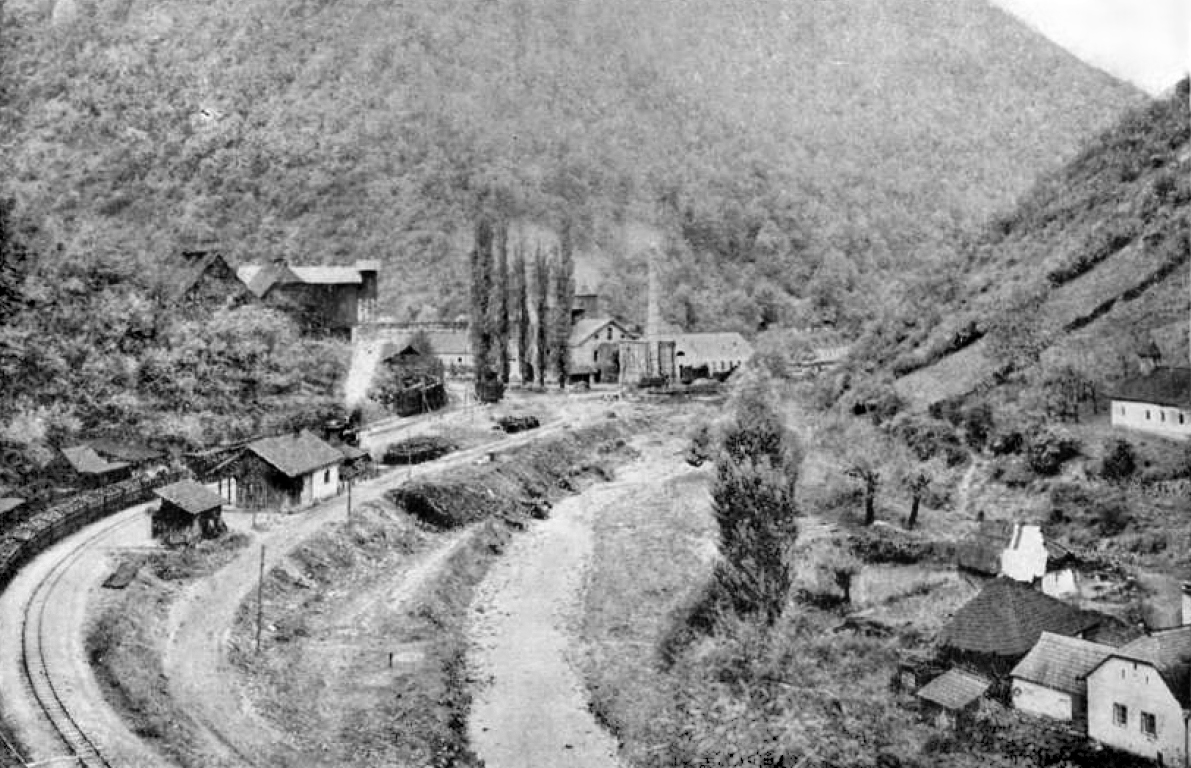
The train station in Govăjdia (1905)

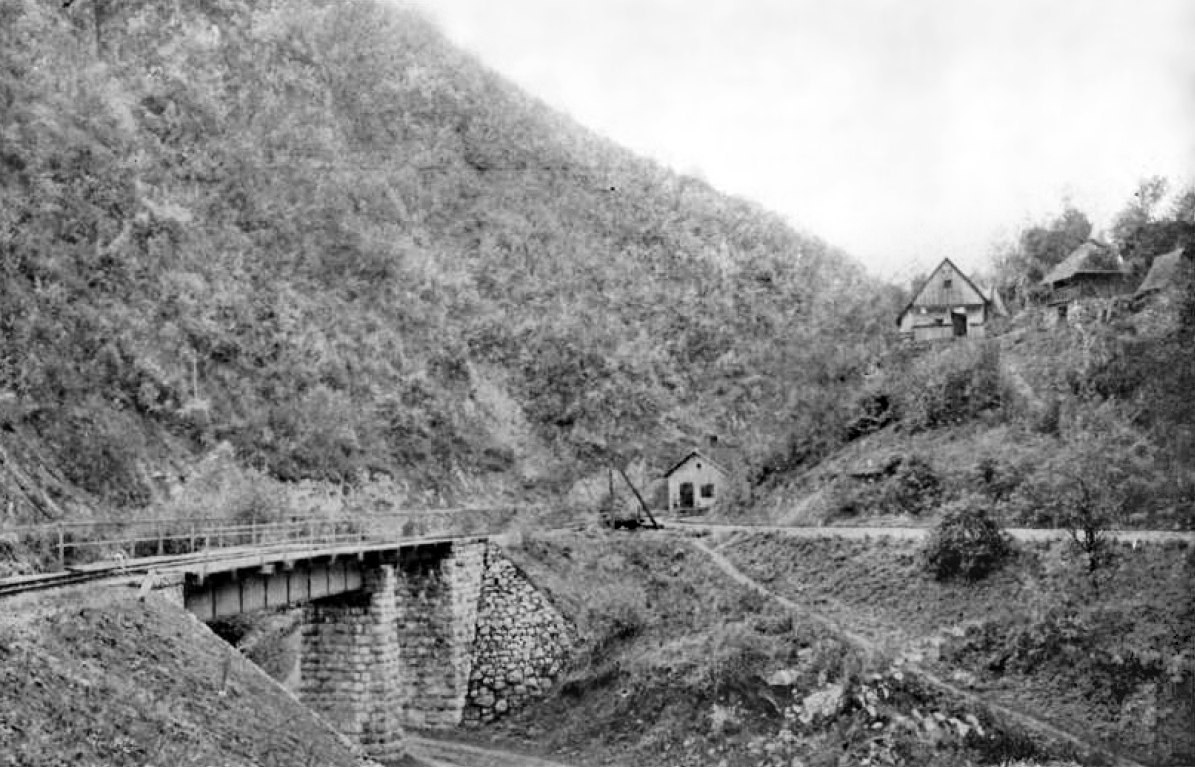
The Nădrab halt and the viaduct for the line leading to the tipplers for the blast furnace in Govăjdia (1905)

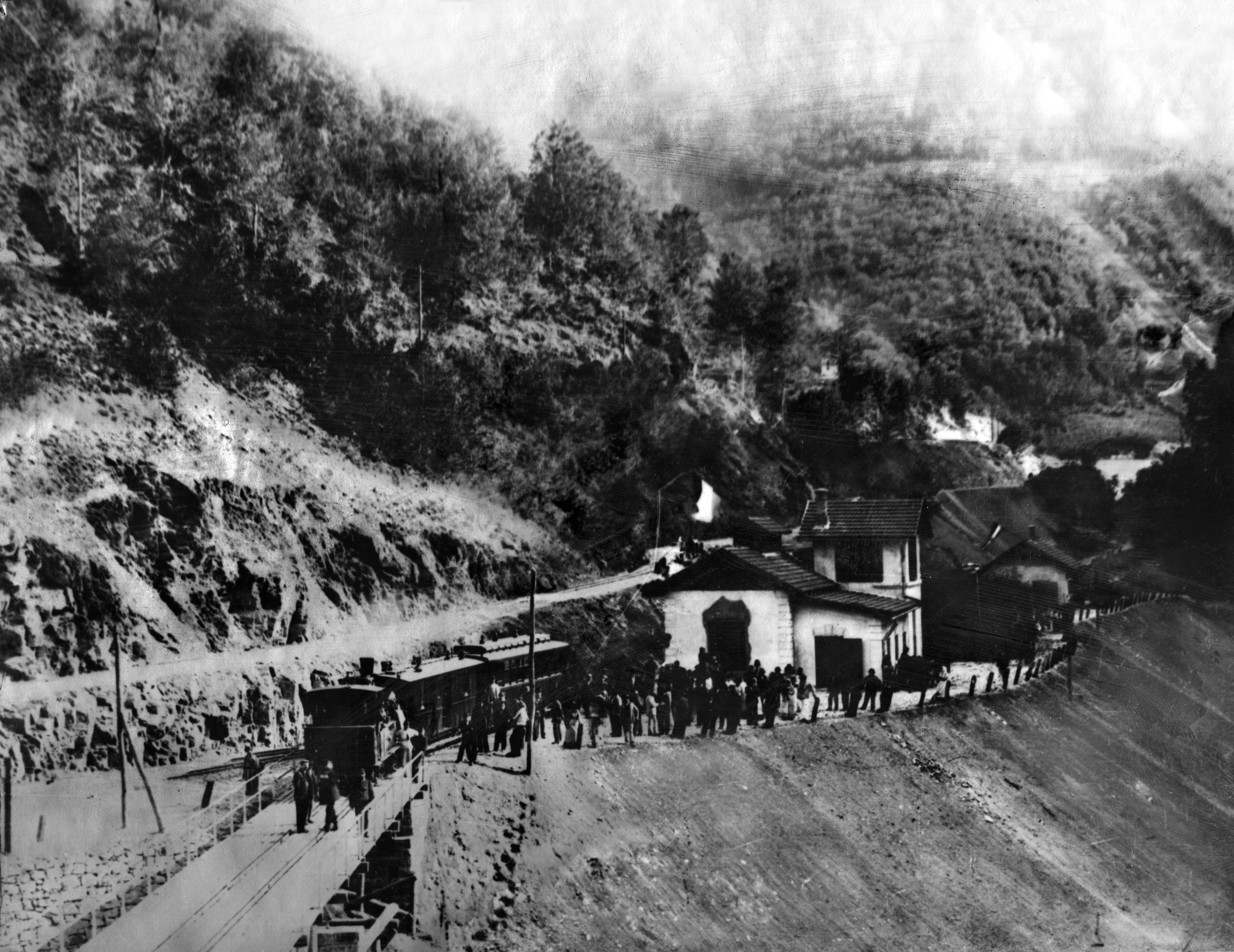
The line opening ceremony held at the Retişoara terminus (29 September 1900)

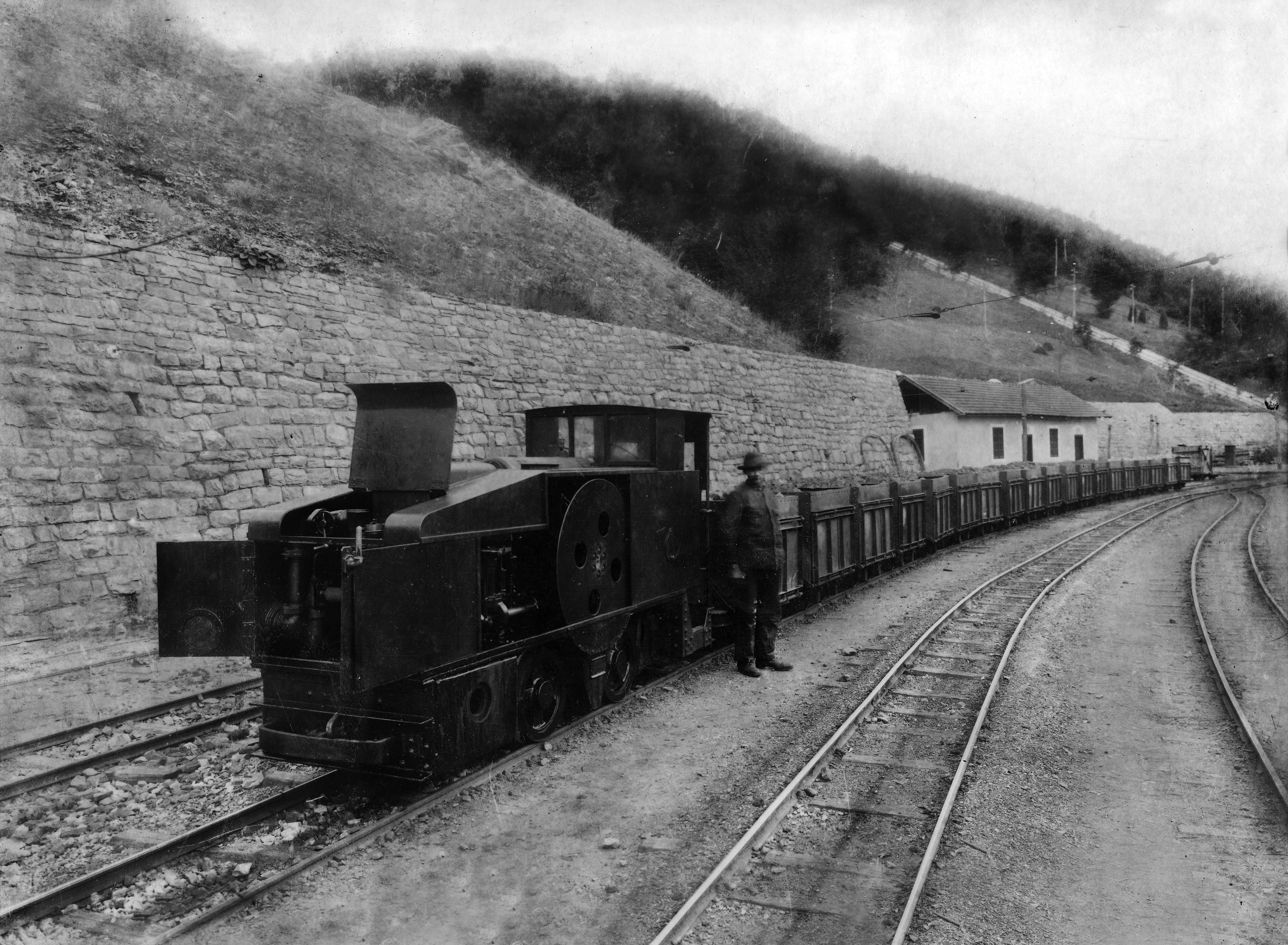
A diesel shunting locomotive at the Retişoara terminus (around 1910)

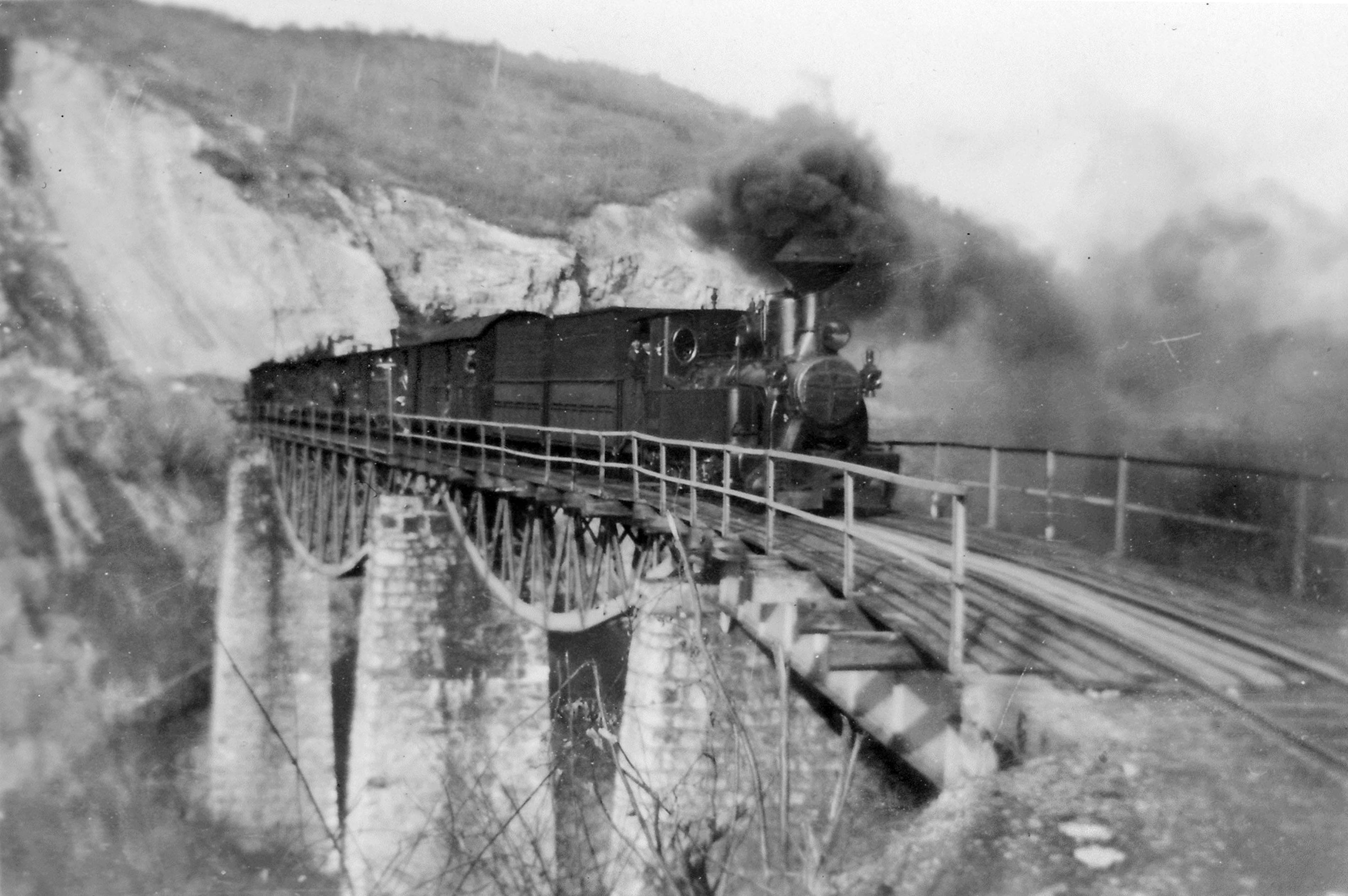
The steam train passing Zlaști valley viaduct around 1930-1940

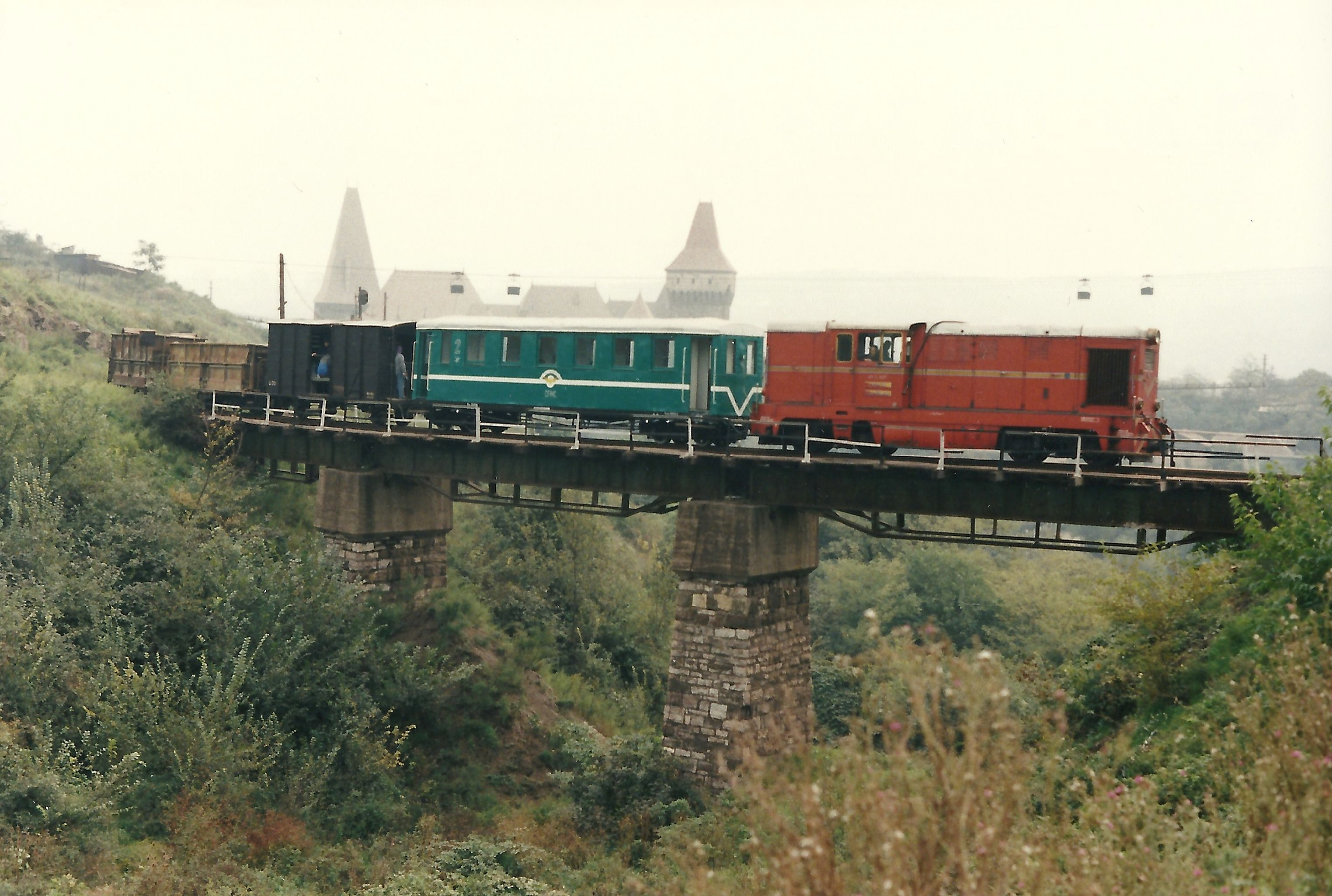
The mixed train on the first curved bridge near the Corvin's Castle (photo: Oliver Wileczelek, 26 September 1995)

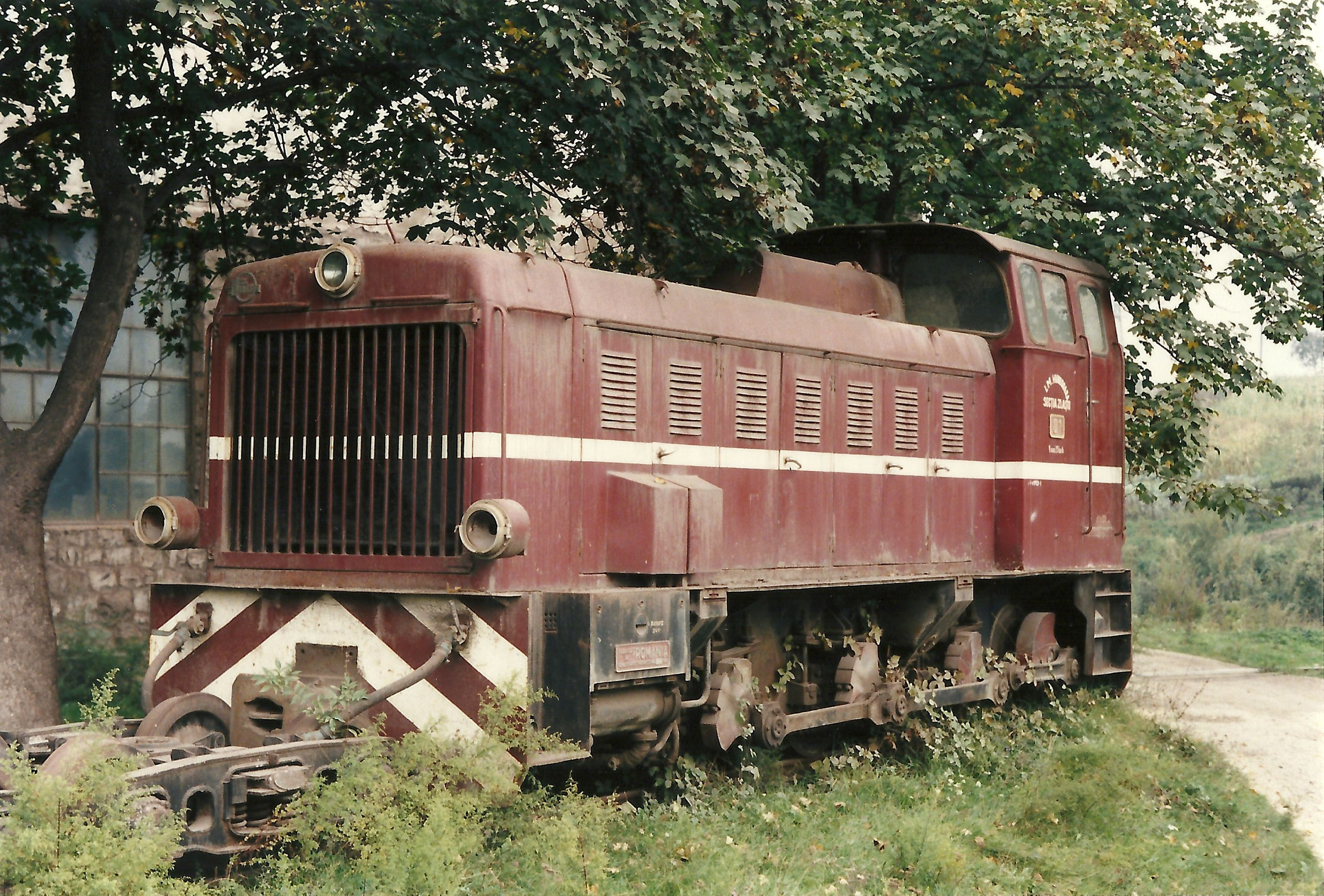
Faur L30H class, 300 horsepower diesel-hydraulic locomotive (photo: Oliver Wileczelek, 26 September 1995)

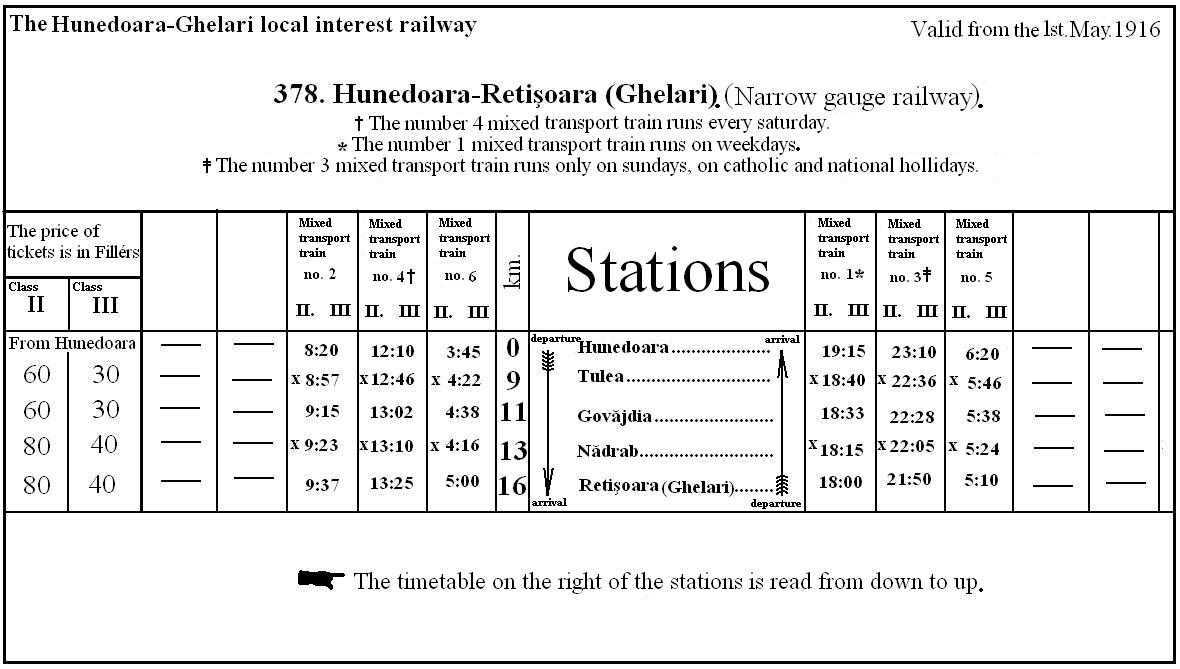
The English replica of the original Hungarian timetable

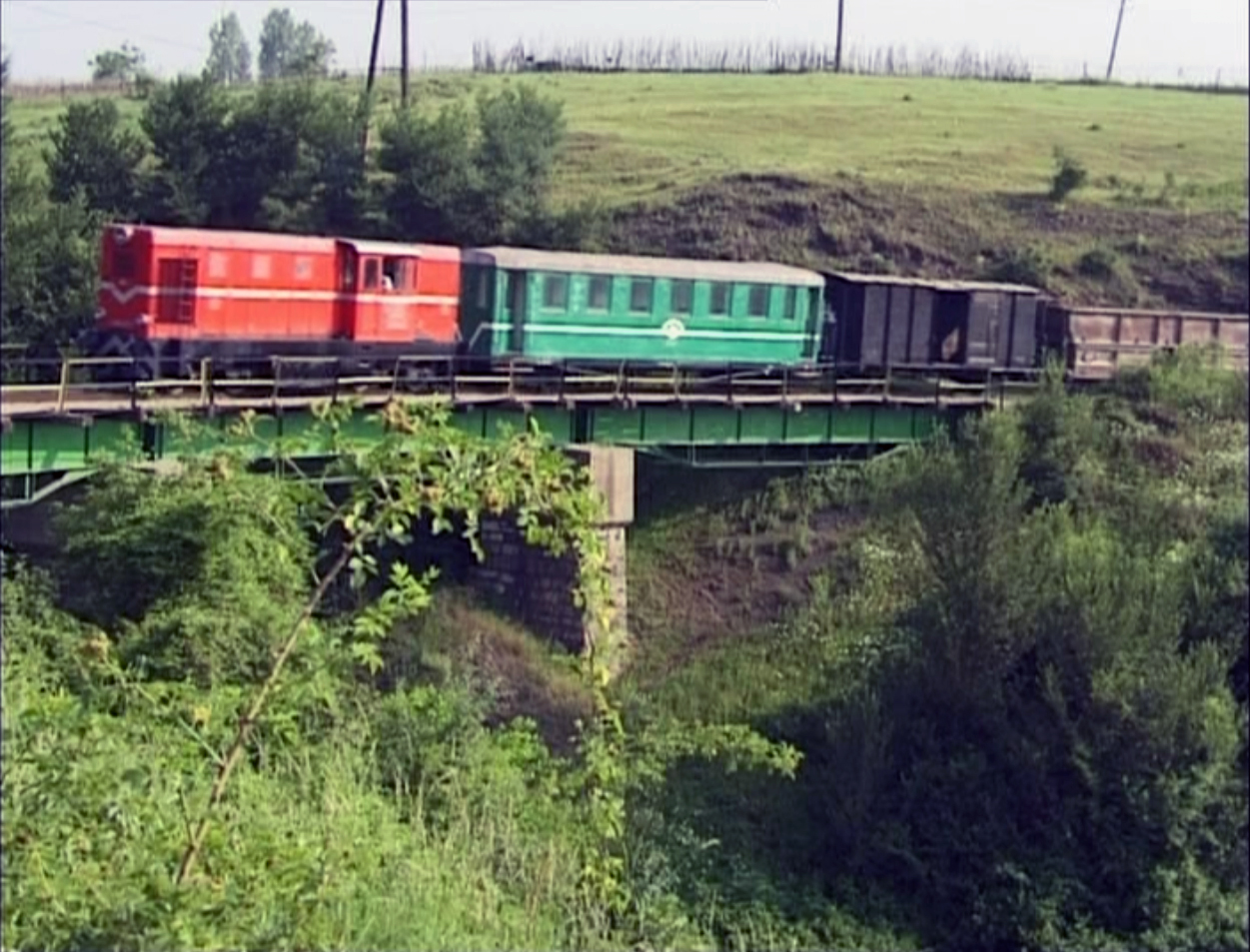
The mixed train on the first curved bridge near the Corvin Castle.(photo: Steve Thomason, 10 June 1998)

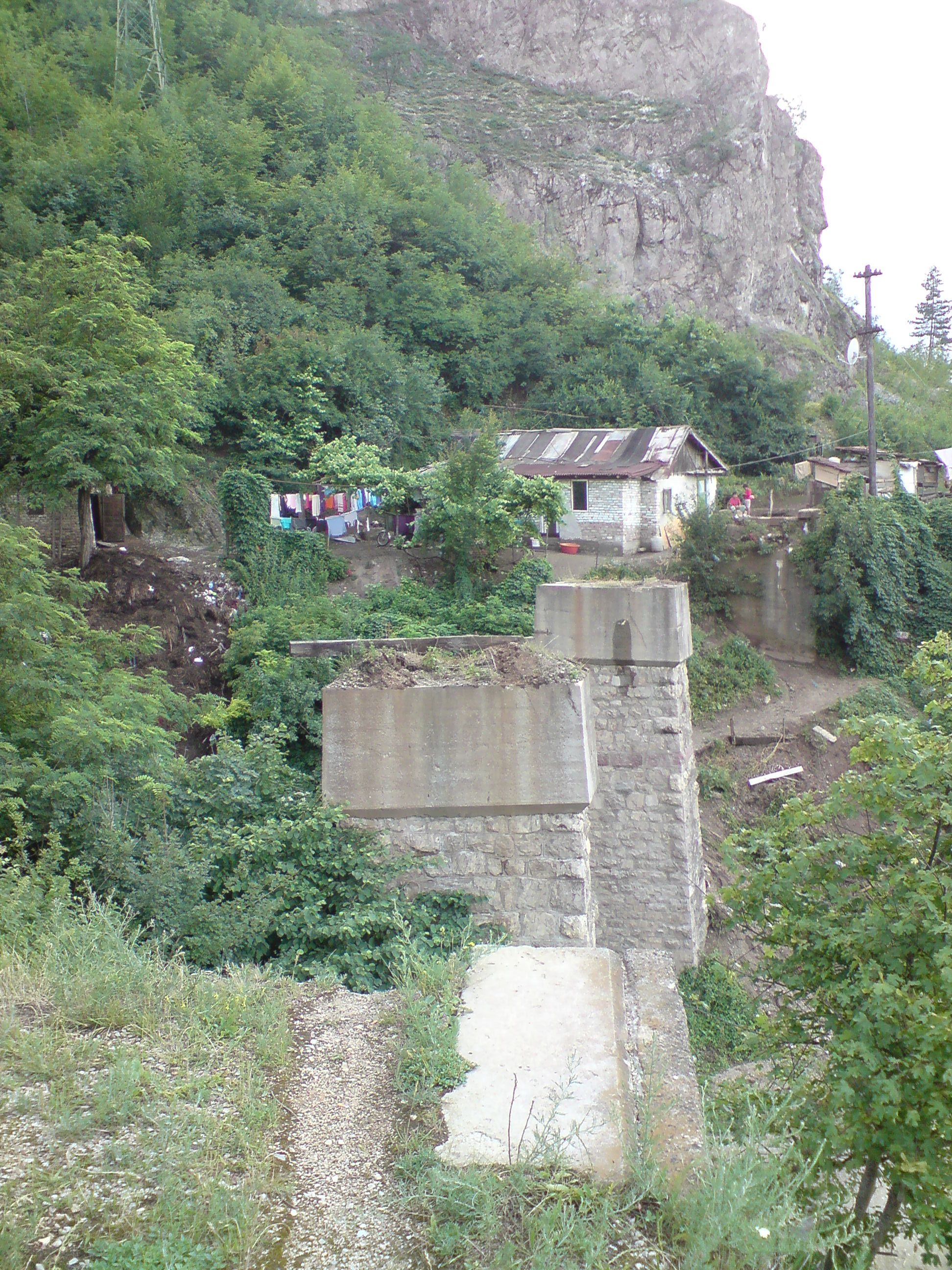
Dismantled curve bridge piers near Canton 1 Zlaști (scrapped 19 June 2009)
