= Bucureșci =

- Commune
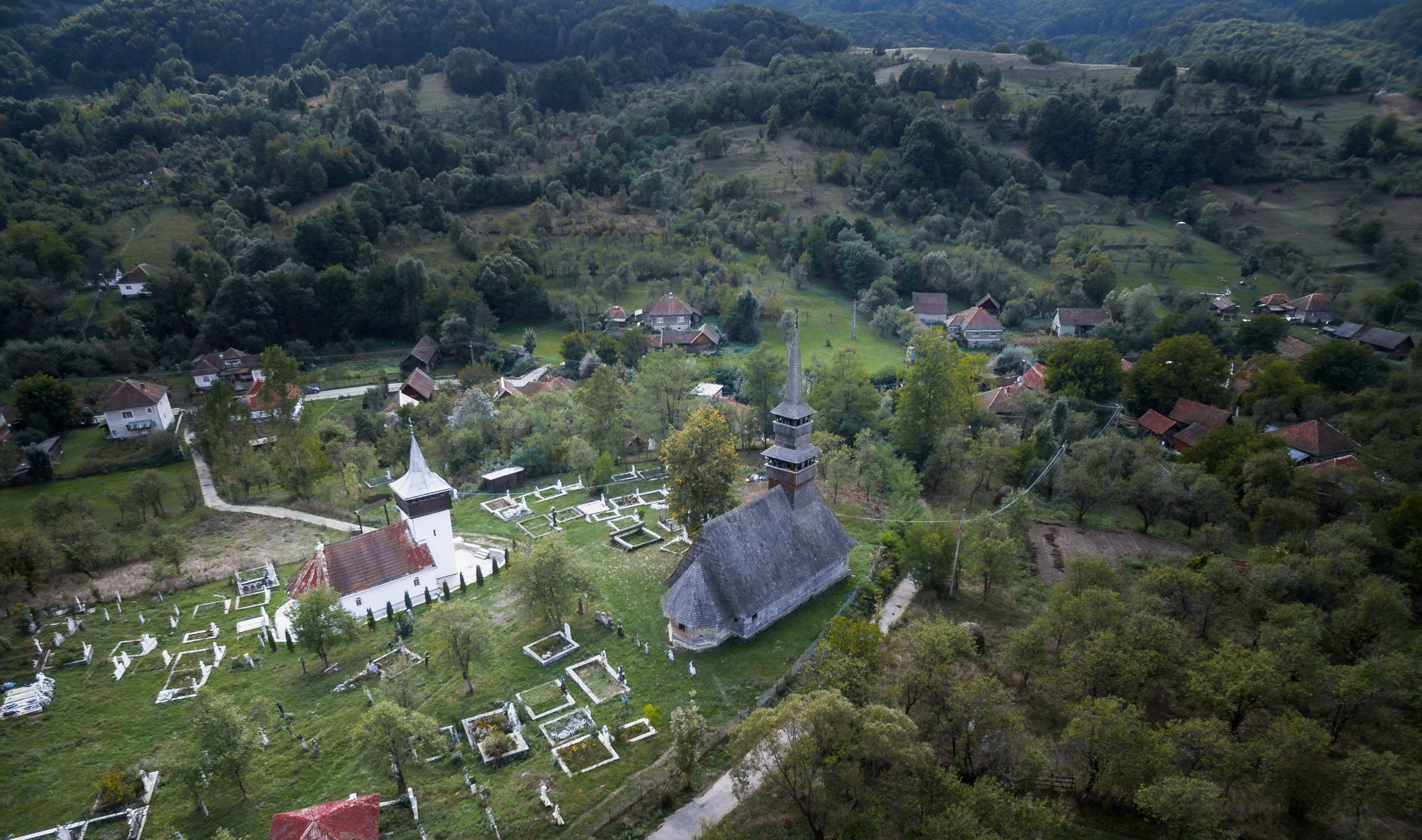
- Aerial view of Curechiu village

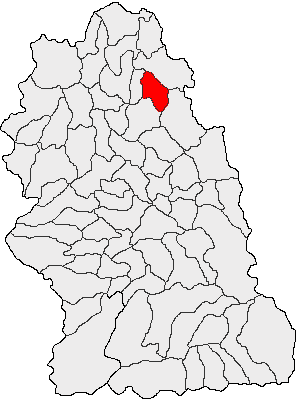
- Location in Hunedoara County

- Location in Romania
- Coordinates: 46°7′40″N 22°54′0″E
- Country: Romania
- County: Hunedoara

Government
  - Mayor (2024–2028): Ancuța Elena Suciu (PSD)
- Area: 69.09 km^{2} (26.68 sq mi)
- Elevation: 316 m (1,037 ft)
- Population (2021-12-01): 1,284
  - Density: 18.58/km^{2} (48.13/sq mi)
- Time zone: UTC+02:00 (EET)
  - Summer (DST): UTC+03:00 (EEST)
- Postal code: 337145
- Area code: +(40) 254
- Vehicle reg.: HD
- Website: www.primariabucuresci.ro

Bucureșci (Hungarian: Bukuresd) is a commune in Hunedoara County, Transylvania, Romania. It is composed of five villages: Bucureșci, Curechiu (Kurety), Merișor, Rovina, and Șesuri (Seszur).

The commune is located in the northern part of the county, 47 km (29 mi) from Deva. It is traversed by the river Bucureșci, a left tributary of the Crișul Alb.

Notable is the Saint Nicholas Church, located in Curechiu. This is a wooden church, built in 1785.

Historical population
Year	Pop.	±%
1910	3,169	—
2002	1,924	−39.3%
2011	1,553	−19.3%
2021	1,284	−17.3%
Source: Census data
