= Cireșata mine =

Open pit mine in Hunedoara County, Romania

Cireșata
- Location in Romania
- Location: Crișcior, Hunedoara County, Romania; 46°04′N 22°31′E
- Production: approx 155,000 ounces (4,400 kg)
- Financial year: 2009
- Company: Euro Sun Mining
- Website: www.eurosunmining.com
- Acquired: 2005

The Cireșata mine is a large open pit mine in the west of Romania in Hunedoara County, 30 km (19 mi) north of Deva and 400 km (250 mi) northwest of the capital, Bucharest. Cireșata represents a large gold and copper deposit with estimated reserves of 4.18 million oz of gold and 174.4 million tonnes of copper ore grading 0.15% copper. The project is owned by the Toronto-based company Euro Sun Mining.

The project will involve the mining and processing of 7.1 million tonnes of ore per annum over an open pit life of 19 years. The open pit is expected to yield approximately 155,000 ounces (4,400 kg) of gold and 10,000 tonnes of copper per year in doré, reflecting an average total process recovery of 68% for gold and approximately 91% for copper.
