= Crișcior =

- Commune
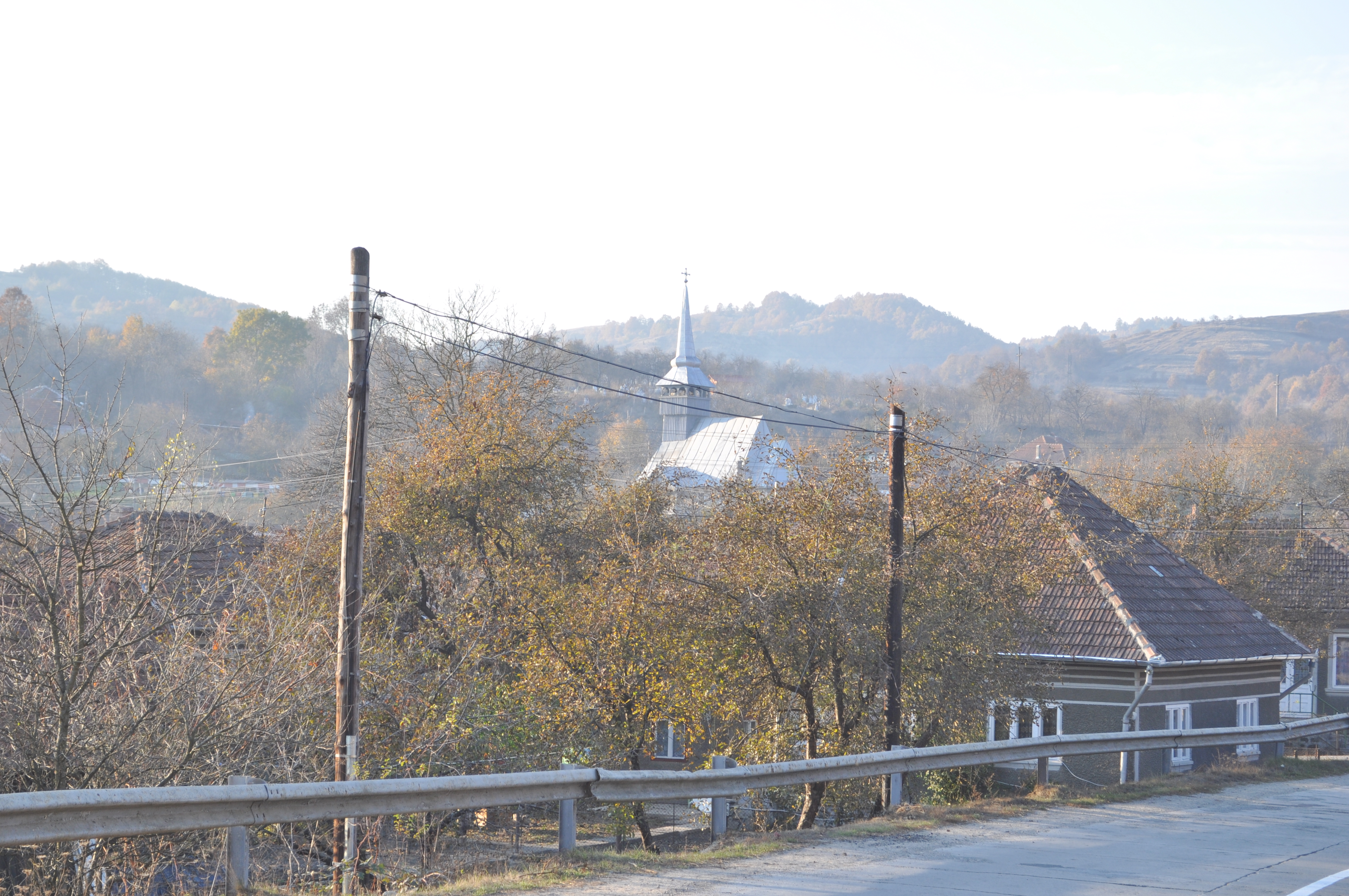
- Zdrapți

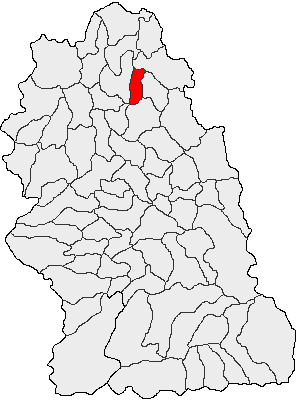
- Location in Hunedoara County

- Location in Romania
- Coordinates: 46°7′N 22°52′E
- Country: Romania
- County: Hunedoara

Government
  - Mayor (2024–2028): Ovidiu Ilie Furdui (PNL)
- Area: 40.19 km^{2} (15.52 sq mi)
- Elevation: 300 m (980 ft)
- Population (2021-12-01): 3,389
  - Density: 84.32/km^{2} (218.4/sq mi)
- Time zone: UTC+02:00 (EET)
  - Summer (DST): UTC+03:00 (EEST)
- Postal code: 337200
- Area code: (+40) 02 54
- Vehicle reg.: HD
- Website: www.primariacriscior.ro

Crișcior (Hungarian: Kristyor, German: Kreischquell) is a commune in Hunedoara County, Transylvania, Romania. It is composed of four villages: Barza (Gurabárza), Crișcior, Valea Arsului (Vályaárszuluj), and Zdrapți (Zdrápc).

The Cireșata mine is a large open pit mine situated on the territory of the commune.

Historical population
Year	Pop.	±%
1850	1,426	—
1900	2,648	+85.7%
1941	3,758	+41.9%
1977	5,107	+35.9%
2002	4,277	−16.3%
2011	3,841	−10.2%
2021	3,389	−11.8%
Source: Census data

== Natives ==
- Arpad Furka (born 1931), organic chemist
