= Vajdahunyad =

Vajdahunyad is the Hungarian name for Hunedoara in Romania.

It may also refer to:

- The Castle of Vajdahunyad, in Hunedoara
- Vajdahunyad Castle, in Budapest, Hungary
