= Hunyadi =

Hunyadi may refer to:

- Hunyadi family, a Hungarian noble family from the Middle Ages
- Hunyadi Castle, a medieval castle of the Hunyadi family in Transylvania in the Kingdom of Hungary, (today Hunedoara, Romania)
- John Hunyadi (c. 1406–1456), Hungarian general and Regent-Governor of the Kingdom of Hungary
- Ladislaus Hunyadi (1431–1457), Hungarian statesman
- Matthias Hunyadi (1443–1490), King of Hungary
- Hunyadi László, an opera from 1844 by the Hungarian composer Ferenc Erkel
- Vajdahunyad Castle, a castle in Budapest, a copy of Hunyadi Castle
- Hunyadi, the 29th day of the month in the Pataphysical calendar
