= Orthodox Church of Ghelar =

Church building in Ghelari, Romania

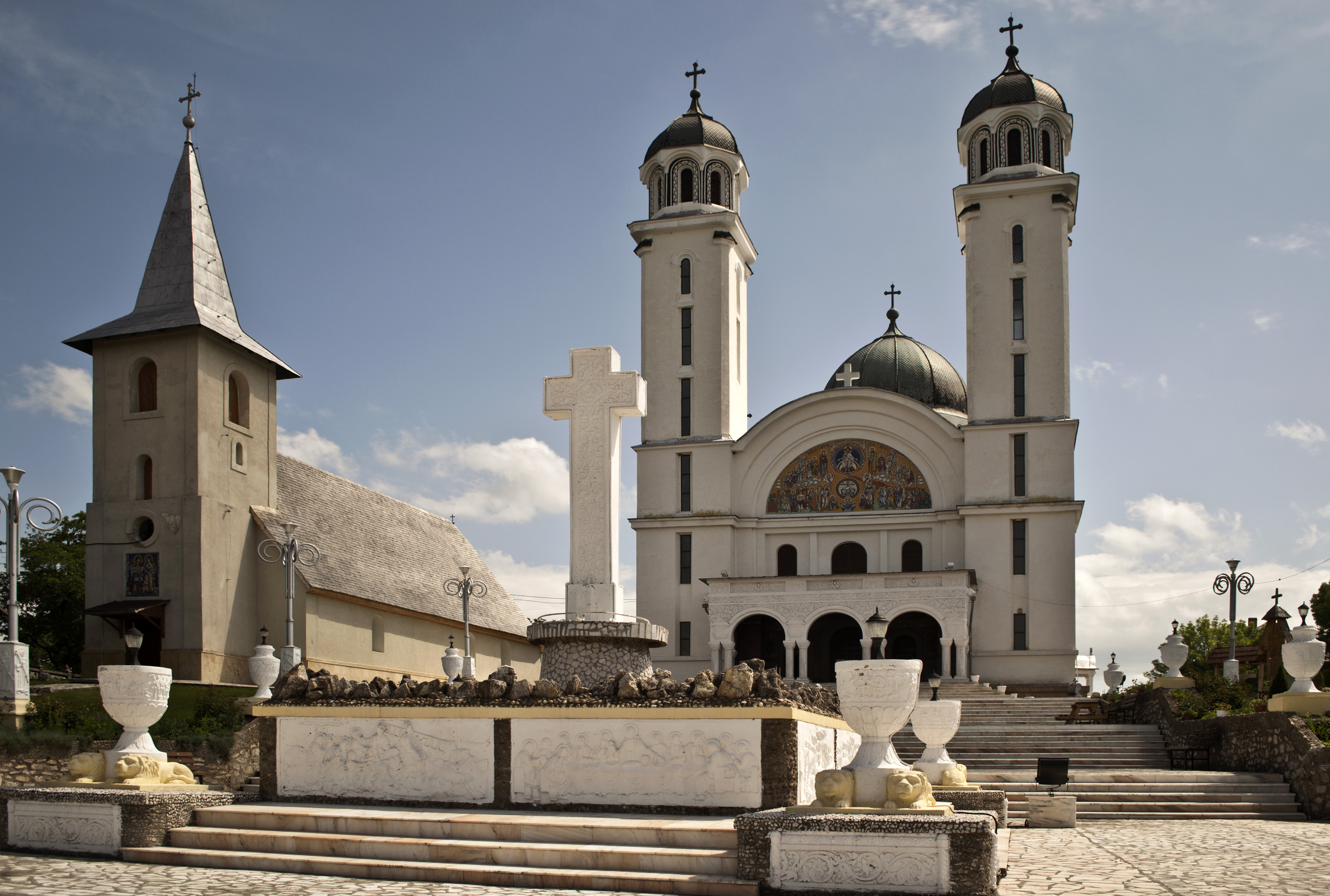
Orthodox Church in Ghelari

The Orthodox Church of Ghelari is a Romanian Orthodox church in Ghelari, Romania.

== Preceding structures ==
The original church was made of wood, but it was pulled down in the 19th century.

The stone church that is still standing today was built by Gheorghe Berevoii, a feudal lord from the neighbouring village of Govăjdia, in 1770, to thank God for having healed his wife. The church is orthodox, although the feudal lord was a Calvinist, and has a painting that includes scenes from Passion Week, portraying the soldiers that insulted Christ wearing the clothes of the people who had oppressed the Romanians from Transylvania.

== Construction ==
Reverend Nerva Florea began the construction of a larger church in 1939 upon moving to the village, due to the increase in population. Florea had moved to Ghelari in March 1939, and began building in September 1939, overseeing the whole building process as the architect of the project. The church was founded on a hill in the center of the village near the ancient stone church. It needed 100 kg (220 lb) of dynamite to level the site, as it was the edge of a stone hill. To raise money, the people of Ghelari made a tour of large factories in the country to collect money for the building. The walls of the building were raised to three meters in 1945. Between 1945 and 1955 the work stopped due to persecution by the communist authorities, during which Florea was imprisoned. Work resumed in 1955, and the church was finished in 1973 and hallowed on 3 November of that year.

== Architecture ==
The building was made of brick with walls one meter thick. The building was in a "Greek Cross" architectonic style. Materials for construction were brought by the train to base of the hill where Ghelari is situated, and from there with an axon cart. Sometimes the villagers dragged the materials with the aid of an inclined plane, transported by train through the mine drift, then brought close to the church by a specially-built cableway and with a cart to construction site. A road connecting Ghelari to Hunedoara was built in 1958.

The painting, with an area of over 4,000 square metres (43,000 square feet), is a fresco in the "bunon fresco" style. The iconostasis is gilded with gold and the icons too, with over eight pounds of gold used for this purpose. The painter of the church was Constantin Nitulescu, and the painting lasted seven years (1960–1967). The sculpture, made of oakwood, was created by the artist Ioan Cristea. At the beginning of the 1980s the church began to crack because the ceiling of the laying under the church could no longer support the weight of the church. The only solution to stop further deterioration of the church was consolidation. First the land was strengthened by injecting cement into the cracks, then by surrounding the church with a belt of ferro-concrete.

== Later years ==
Florea died on 22 July 1990 and was buried in the church, with many plans for the future of the church incomplete. The consolidation of the vertical line could not be carried out due to lack of funds. Florea also planned to paint the exterior side of the church in mosaic, surround it with seven artesian wells, and render the monumental entrance in marble.
