= Silvian =

Silvian is a Romanian masculine given name. Notable people with the name include:

- Silvian Cristescu (born 1970), Romanian footballer
- Silvian Dobre (born 1967), Romanian footballer
- Silvian Iosifescu (1917–2006), literary critic, educator, translator, and professor
