= Govăjdia Blast Furnace =

- Furnalul din Govăjdia (Romanian)
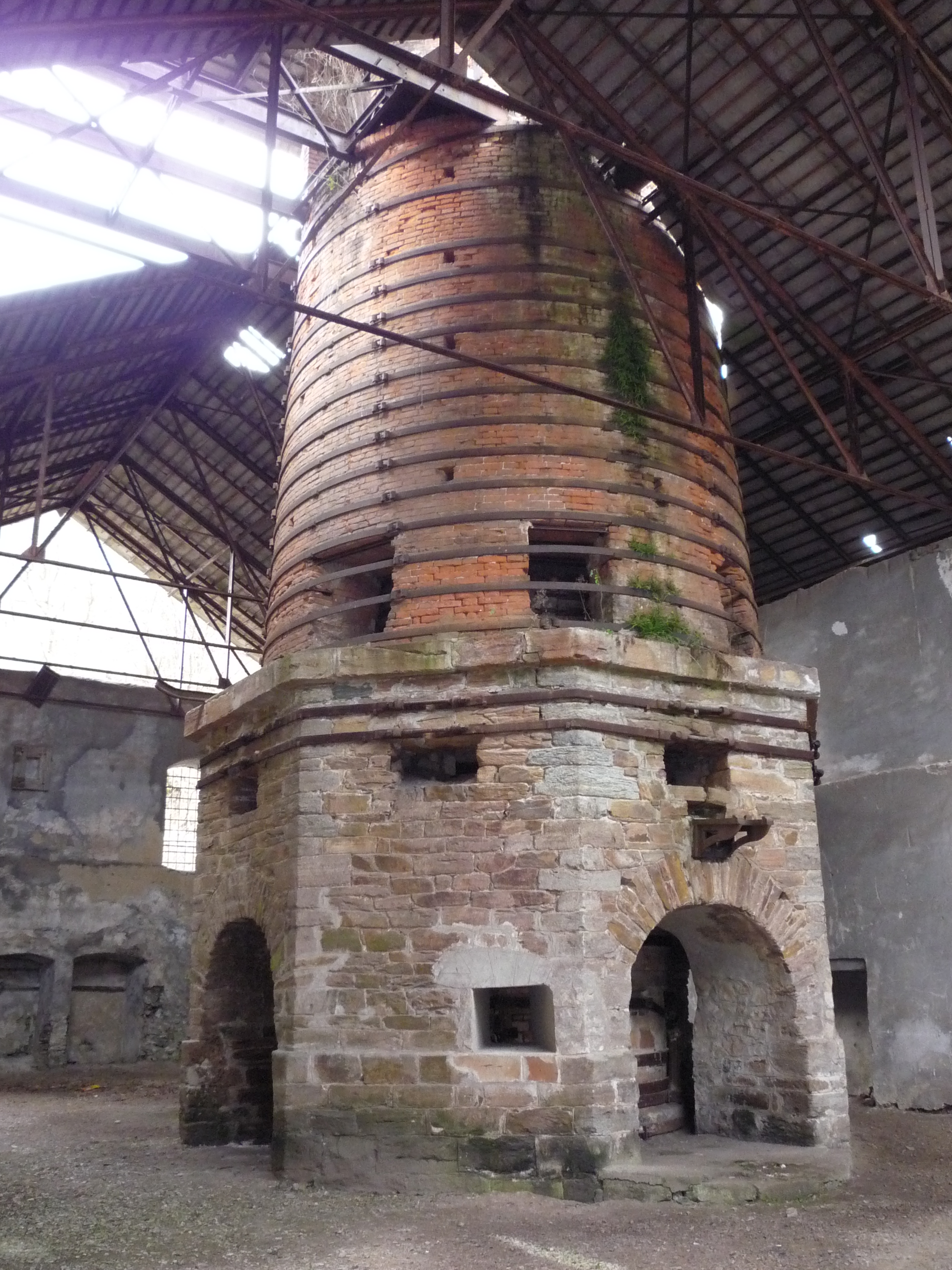
- Octagonal stone base, conical brick body wrapped in iron girdles, dotted with blast holes

- Location within Romania
- 45.740708°N 22.791063°E
- Location: Govăjdia village, Ghelari Commune, Hunedoara County, Transylvania region

History
- Built: 1806–1813
- Rebuilt: 1851 (modified)

Monument istoric
- Type: monument of industrial architecture
- Designated: 2000
- Part of: Historic monuments in Hunedoara County
- Reference no.: LMI Code: HD-II-m-A-03322
- Country: Romania

The Govăjdia Blast Furnace is a disused blast furnace in Govăjdia village, Ghelari Commune, Hunedoara County, in the Transylvania region of Romania.

An earlier blast furnace had been set up at Toplița in 1781, but the quantity of raw materials it prepared for workshops involved in cast iron refining proved inadequate. Thus, the Thesaurariat at Sibiu, which represented the Imperial Austrian authorities, coordinated mining activities in Transylvania and had an office based in the Corvin Castle, decided in 1802 to build a second furnace in the Hunedoara area. The site chosen was at the confluence of two rivers close to a group of forge works and iron mines. Construction began in 1806, and although finished in 1810, production only began in April 1813, once the necessary annexes had been built. A tablet placed on the front of the furnace read: Augusto Imperante Francisco Extructum 1810 ("Built 1810 during the reign of the venerable Francis"). Its dimensions were: total height 8.5 m; hearth diameter at bottom 1.10 m; maximum bosh diameter 1.14 m; throat diameter 1.05 m; bosh height at lower line 3.15 m; working volume 2,002 m^{3}.

The furnace's first period of use was fairly short at seven and a half months, as the crucible had become quite worn and enough cast iron had been generated to last the nearby workshops three years. In all, 1,380.3 tons of cast iron were produced. Periods of repair, use and abandonment followed over the ensuing century. In 1837, a fire caused structural damage to the furnace, and an investment of 40,529 florins was approved. Its volume was expanded to 26.45 m^{3} (934 cu ft), the water wheel was repaired and the bellows compressor was improved. On August 25, 1840, an air preheater began operating. In 1841, a narrow gauge railway for transporting ore to the furnace's upper opening was installed. Little wagons would load the ore downward into the furnace; this mechanism replaced the inclined planes used earlier. The railway was 246.8 m (810 ft) long and made of cast iron from Govăjdia, and was the first such of its kind in Transylvania, extended to Hunedoara in 1900 (see Transylvanian mining railway). The cooling systems, the loading mechanism and the continuous production cycle were quite advanced for contemporary Europe. In 1871, the annual output of the blast furnace reached 5,605 tons. Its most intense period of production took place between 1871 and 1889. By the end of the 19th century, the furnace, fed with iron ore from the old mines in the Poiana Ruscă Mountains, was producing over 8,000 tons of gray iron annually, with a peak production of 8,800 tons in 1889. Legend holds that metal prepared there as well as at the Reșița works was used for raw material in the building of the Eiffel Tower, but there is no documentary evidence in support of this claim. Activity lessened after 1896 due to the new Hunedoara Steel Works. The final repairs were made in 1914–1916, and the last batch of cast iron came out in 1918. After World War I, the furnace went into decline, due to the lack of raw materials, especially coke, which had been brought until then from Silesia. The furnace closed down permanently in 1924.

In 1934, the two bellows were dismantled, and in 1944 the bridge on which the aggregate was loaded was demolished; the then director of the Hunedoara Iron Works, a refugee in Govăjdia, for fear of the Allied bombings, destroyed the bridge so as not to attract attention of airplanes as an industrial objective. Later on, the tile roof was opened.

In 2000, the blast furnace was declared a monument of industrial architecture. In 2008, the site was acquired by Ghelari Town Hall because of a failure by Hunedoara Steel Works, the previous owner, to pay taxes on the property. As of 2010, the chimney was intact with the original iron girdles still in place, but the roof was in serious need of repair, and the site was strewn with garbage, although the interior was fairly clean.

== See also ==
- List of preserved historic blast furnaces

== Gallery ==
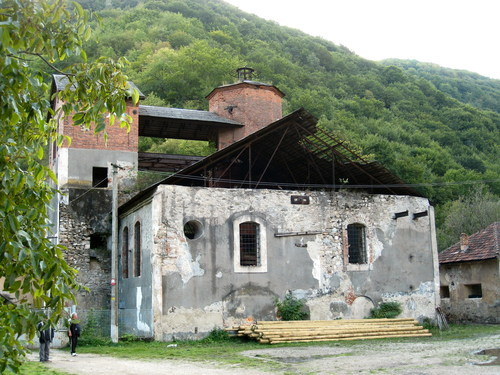
Furnace building

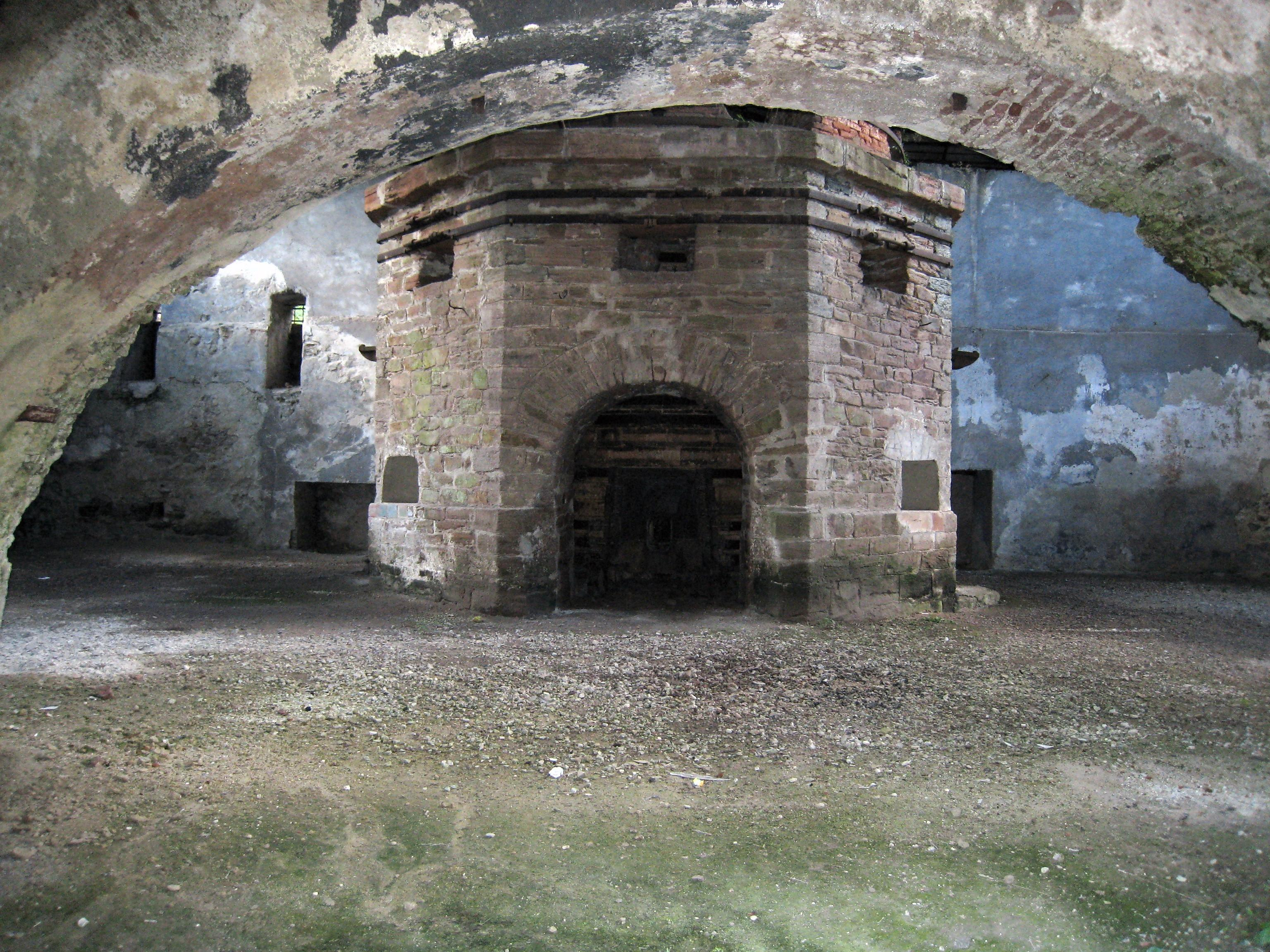
Crucible area

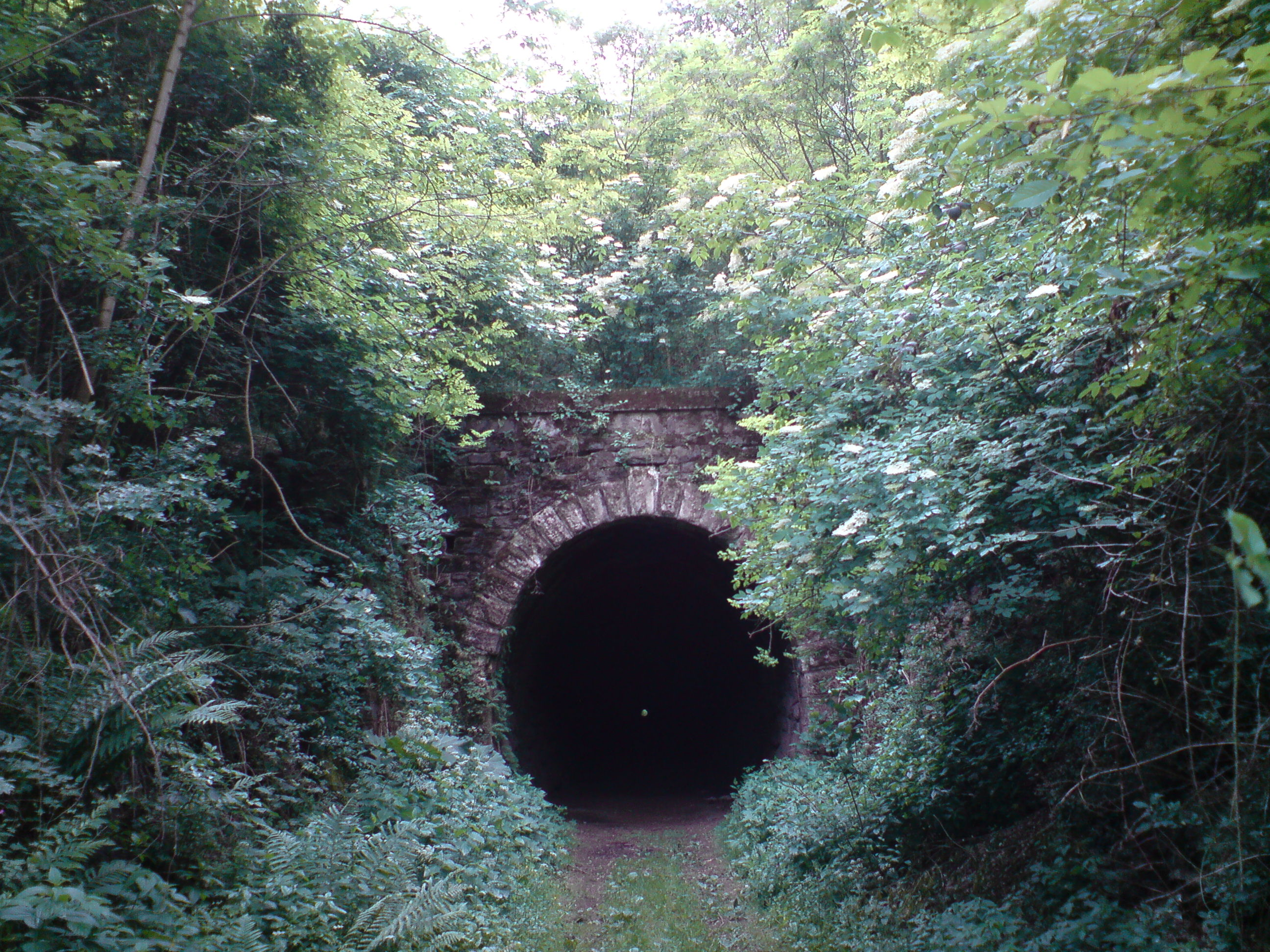
Tunnel for ore transport

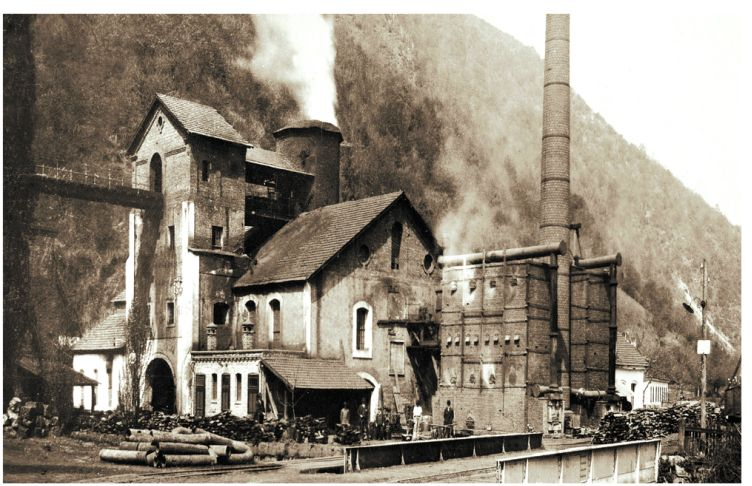
In use, 1890

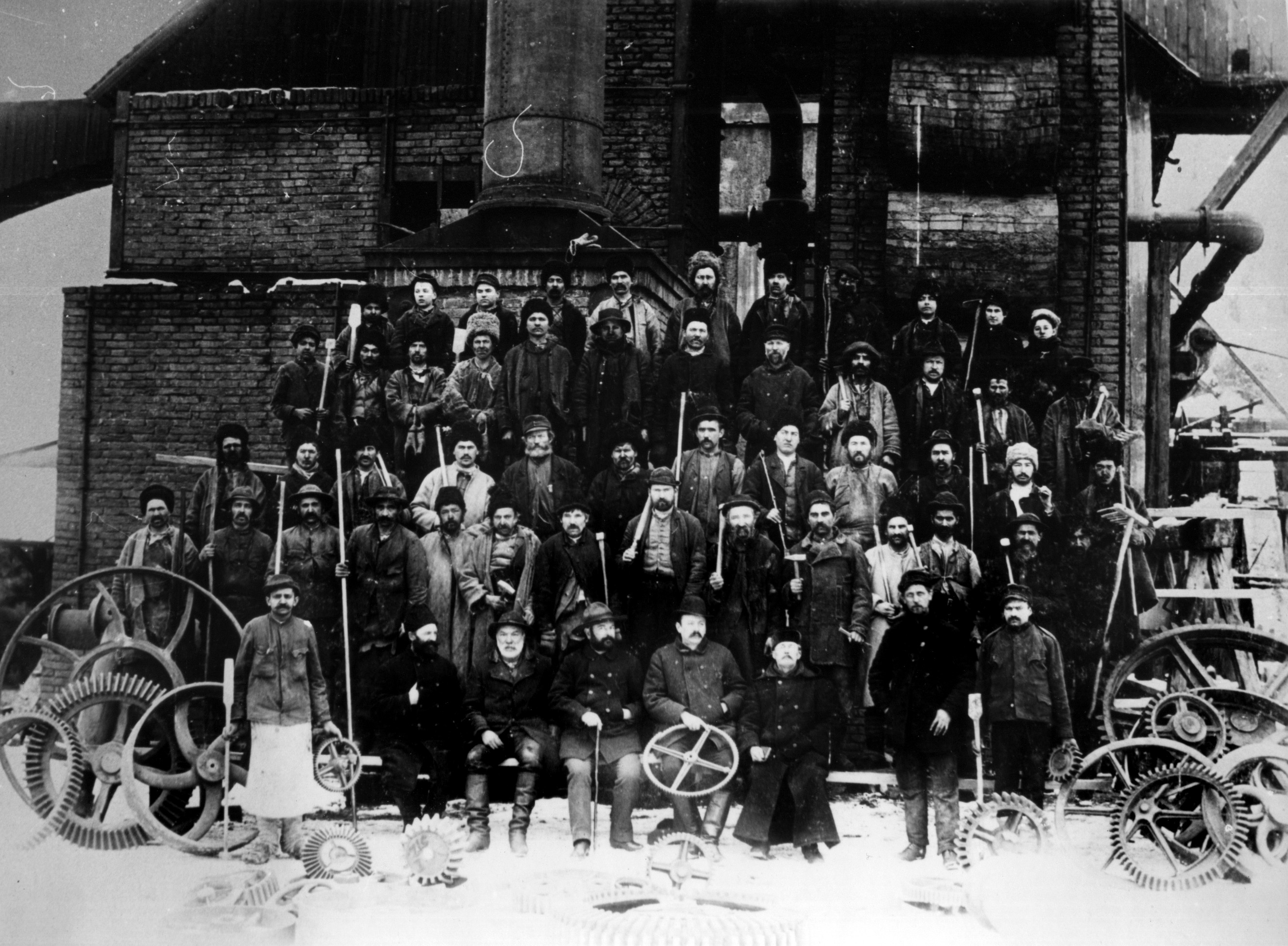
Employees, 1890

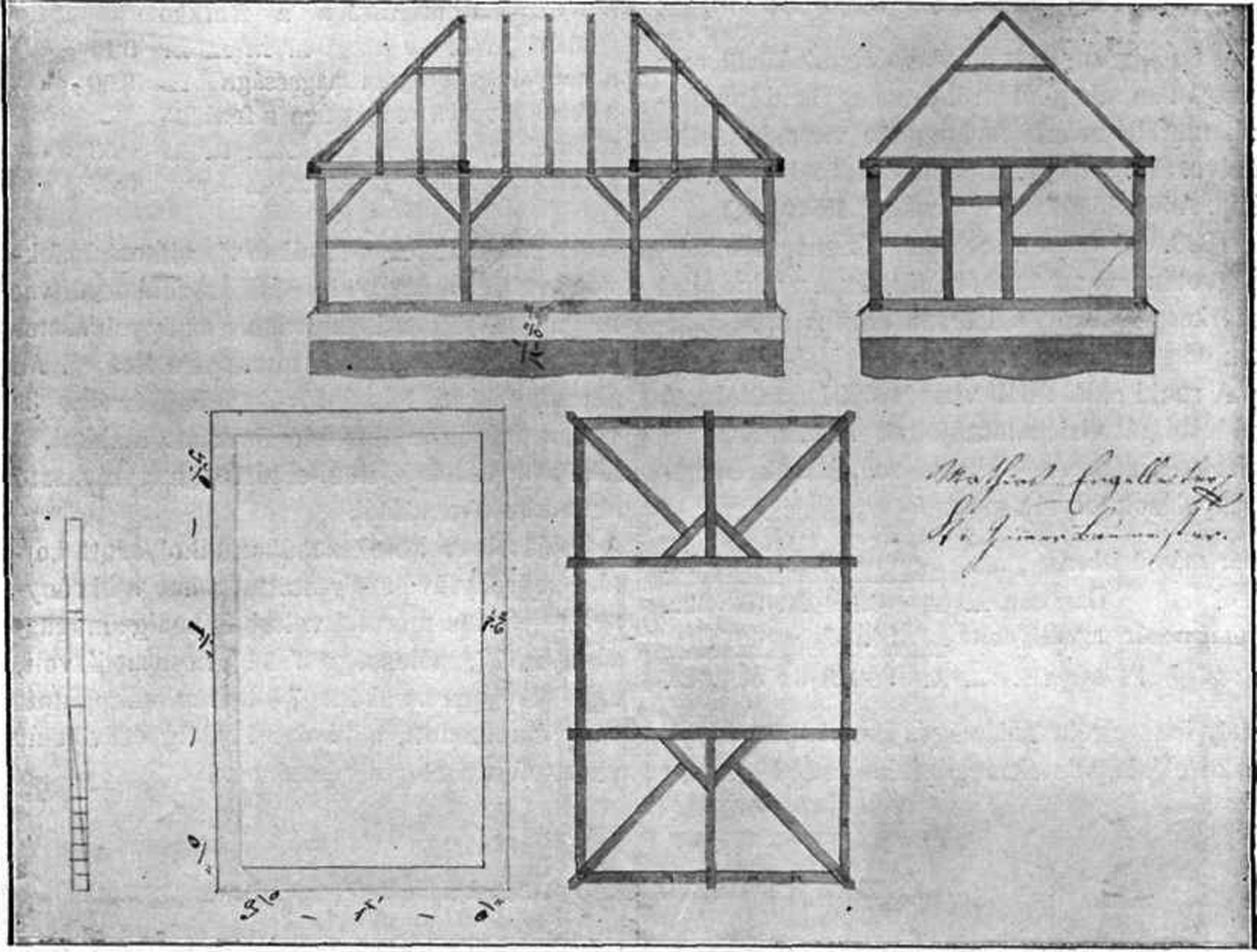
Drawing of the manganese deposit, 1808

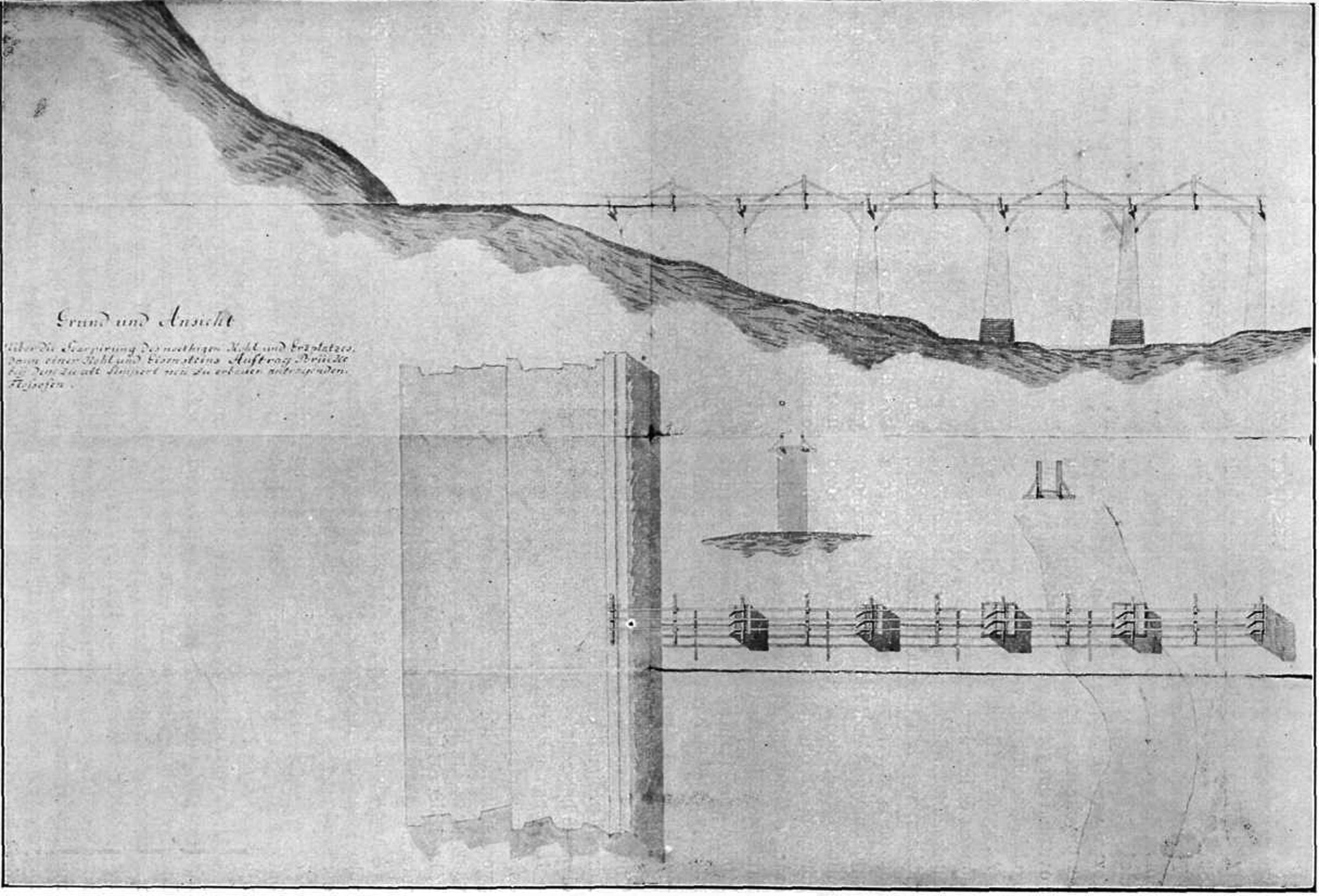
Sketch of the viaduct for loading the furnace, 1808
