= Ghelari =

- Commune
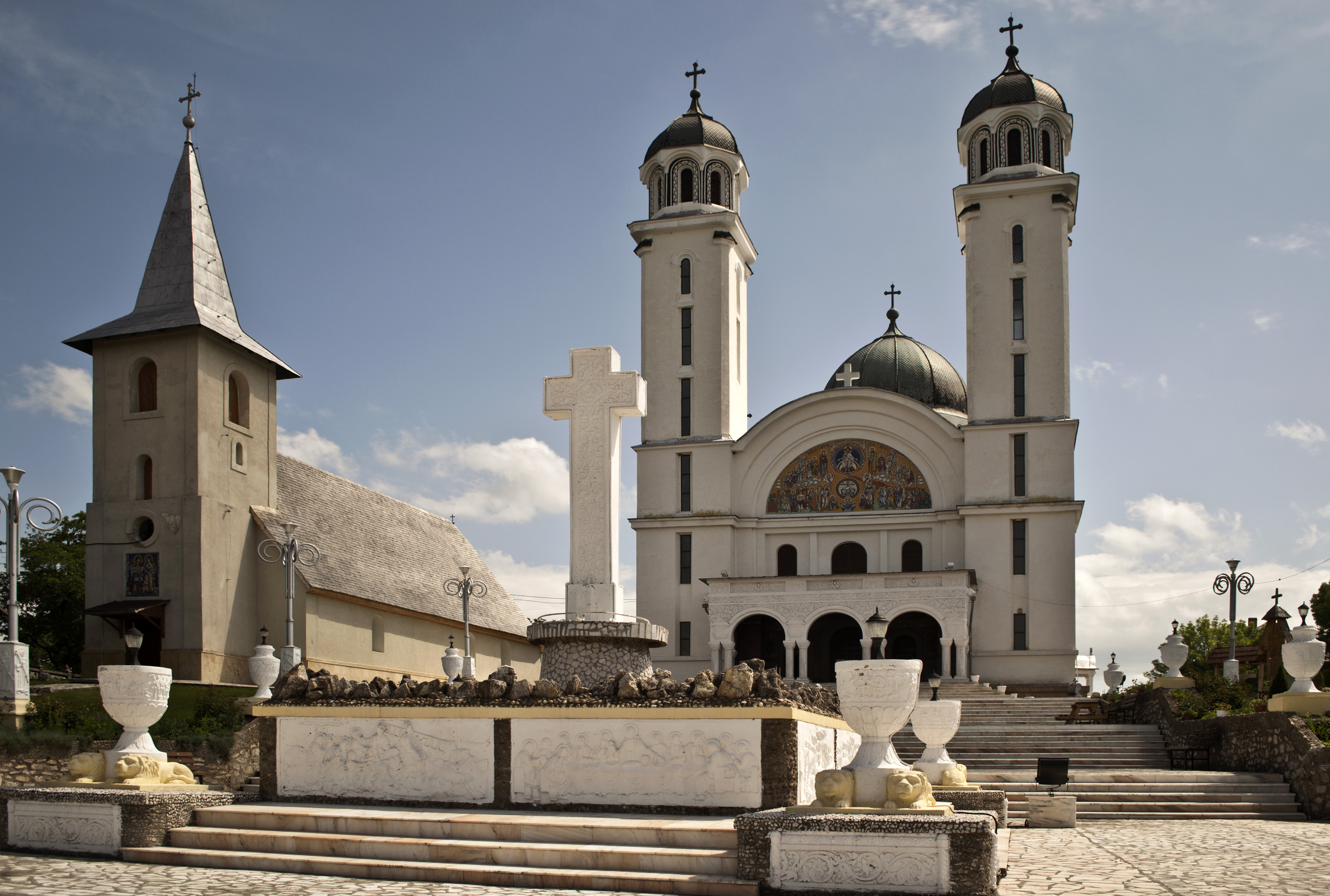
- Romanian Orthodox Cathedral in Ghelari

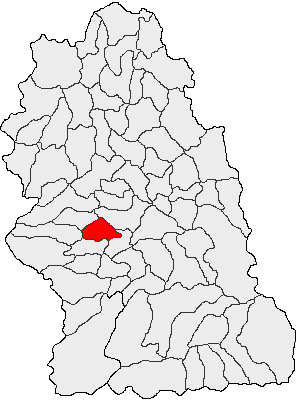
- Location in Hunedoara County

- Location in Romania
- Coordinates: 45°43′N 22°47′E
- Country: Romania
- County: Hunedoara

Government
  - Mayor (2020–2024): Iancu-Emerson Toma (PSD)
- Area: 46.83 km^{2} (18.08 sq mi)
- Elevation: 745 m (2,444 ft)
- Population (2021-12-01): 1,501
  - Density: 32.05/km^{2} (83.01/sq mi)
- Time zone: UTC+02:00 (EET)
  - Summer (DST): UTC+03:00 (EEST)
- Postal code: 337240
- Area code: (+40) 02 54
- Vehicle reg.: HD
- Website: primariaghelari.ro

Ghelari (Hungarian: Gyalár) is a commune in Hunedoara County, Transylvania, Romania. It is composed of four villages: Ghelari, Govăjdia (Govasdia), Plop, and Ruda.

The commune is located in the central part of the county, 15 km (9.3 mi) southwest of Hunedoara.

Govăjdia village is the site of the Govăjdia Blast Furnace.

Historical population
Year	Pop.	±%
1850	1,673	—
1966	5,190	+210.2%
2002	2,314	−55.4%
2011	1,983	−14.3%
2021	1,501	−24.3%
Source: Census data

== Natives ==
- Sandu Florea (born 1946), Romanian-American comic book and comic strip creator
- Ovidiu Cornel Hanganu (born 1970), football striker

== See also ==
- Orthodox Church of Ghelar
- Transylvanian mining railway
