= Marius Cheregi =

Romanian footballer

Personal information
- Date of birth: 4 October 1967 (age 59)
- Place of birth: Oradea, Romania
- Height: 1.84 m (6 ft 0 in)
- Position: Midfielder

Senior career*
Years	Team	Apps	(Gls)
1985–1989	UTA Arad (Note: The statistics for the 1985–86, 1986–87, 1987–88 Divizia B seasons are unavailable.)	5	(0)
1989–1990	Bihor Oradea	28	(7)
1990–1993	Dinamo București	82	(10)
1993	Cercle Brugge	11	(1)
1993–1994	Samsunspor	19	(0)
1995–1996	Dinamo București	21	(0)
1996–1997	Brașov	26	(2)
1997–1998	Hapoel Tayibe		
1998–1999	Hapoel Be'er Sheva		
1999–2000	Videoton	18	(2)
2000–2003	Ferencváros	43	(1)
Total		231	(23)

International career^{‡}
1990–1993	Romania	6	(0)
- * Club domestic league appearances and goals as of 18 September 2017 ‡ National team caps and goals as of 18 September 2017

Marius Cheregi (born 4 October 1967) is a Romanian former professional footballer who played as a midfielder.

== Club career ==
=== UTA Arad and Bihor Oradea ===
Cheregi was born on 4 October 1967 in Oradea, Romania. He began playing football in 1985 at Divizia B club UTA Arad. In 1989, he joined Bihor Oradea, making his Divizia A debut on 23 August under coach Robert Cosmoc in a 2–1 away victory against Politehnica Timișoara. He scored a career-best seven goals until the end of the 1989–90 season.

=== Dinamo București ===
In 1990, Cheregi joined Dinamo București. He played four games during the 1990–91 European Cup, scoring once to help the team get past St Patrick's Athletic, but they were defeated by Porto in the following round. In the next season, Cheregi managed to score four goals in the 28 league games coach Florin Halagian used him as the capital side won the national championship undefeated. In the same season, he helped Dinamo eliminate Luis Figo's Sporting Lisbon with a 2–1 aggregate victory in the first round of the UEFA Cup, with their campaign ending in the following round as they lost to Genoa. Afterwards, he helped them advance past Kuusysi Lahti in the first round of the 1992–93 Champions League. Dinamo faced Olympique Marseille in the second round, where they drew 0–0 in the first leg but lost the subsequent game with 2–0, the French ultimately winning the competition.

=== Cercle Brugge and Samsunspor ===
In 1993, Cheregi along with teammates Dorinel Munteanu, Tibor Selymes, and Ovidiu Hanganu transferred from Dinamo to Cercle Brugge. He made his Belgian First Division debut on 7 August under coach Georges Leekens in a 2–0 away loss to Gent. On 17 October, he netted his first goal in a 4–2 defeat to Beveren.

Afterwards, Cheregi went to play in Turkey at Samsunspor alongside compatriots Bogdan Stelea, Daniel Timofte, Silvian Dobre and Luca Constantin, being coached by Gheorghe Mulțescu. His Turkish league debut took place on 12 December 1993 in a 2–0 away victory against Karşıyaka. He helped the team win the 1993–94 Balkans Cup, scoring a goal in the first leg of the 5–0 aggregate victory against PAS Giannina in the final.

=== Dinamo and Brașov ===
In 1995, Cheregi returned to Dinamo. He played in both legs of the 2–1 aggregate loss to Levski Sofia in the preliminary round of the 1995–96 UEFA Cup. He joined Brașov in 1996 and played regularly for them during the 1996–97 season, but could not avoid the team's relegation to Divizia B. He made a total of 170 appearances with 20 goals in Divizia A.

=== Israel and Hungary ===
In 1997, Cheregi went to play for Israeli second-tier club Hapoel Tayibe. One year later, he joined Hapoel Be'er Sheva in the same league.

Cheregi signed with Videoton in 1999, helping the team earn first league promotion at the end of the 1999–2000 Nemzeti Bajnokság II season. Subsequently, he went to play for Ferencváros, making his Nemzeti Bajnokság I debut on 22 July 2000 under coach János Csank in a 4–0 win over Haladás. He played 22 matches until the end of the season, as the team won the championship. In the following season, he played in both legs of the aggregate loss to Hajduk Split in the 2001–02 Champions League second qualifying round. He scored his first league goal on 25 May 2002 in a 2–0 victory against Dunaferr. Afterwards, Cheregi played in a 4–0 win over Kocaelispor in the first round of the 2002–03 UEFA Cup. He retired after making four league appearances for Ferencváros during the first half of the 2002–03 season, but the team still managed to win the Magyar Kupa without him.

== International career ==
Cheregi played six matches for Romania, making his debut on 4 February 1990, when coach Emerich Jenei sent him in the 75th minute to replace Dănuț Lupu in a 0–0 friendly draw against Algeria. Subsequently, he played in a 7–0 victory against the Faroe Islands in the 1994 World Cup qualifiers. His last appearance for the national team took place on 3 February 1993 in a 2–0 friendly win over Peru.

== Honours ==
Dinamo București

- Divizia A: 1991–92

Samsunspor

- Balkans Cup: 1993–94

Videoton

- Nemzeti Bajnokság II: 1999–2000

Ferencváros

- Nemzeti Bajnokság I: 2000–01
- Magyar Kupa: 2002–03
