= Seven Wonders of Romania =

Various lists of the Seven Wonders of Romania (Romanian: Cele Șapte Minuni ale României) have been compiled from the past to the present day, to catalogue Romania's most spectacular artificial structures.

Map of Romania with Seven Wonders sites marked.
Appears on one list
Appears on two lists
Appears on all three lists
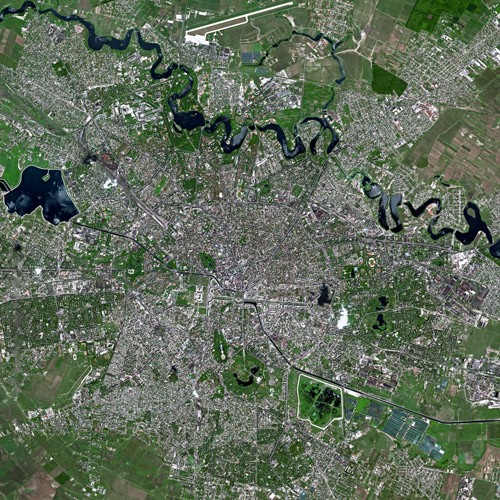
Map of Bucharest with Seven Wonders sites marked.
Appears on one list

== Lists ==
=== Evenimentul Zilei's Seven Wonders ===
| Number | Wonder | Location |
|---|---|---|
| 1 | Sculptural Ensemble of Constantin Brâncuși | Târgu Jiu, Gorj County |
| 2 | Corvin Castle | Hunedoara, Hunedoara County |
| 3 | Alba Carolina Citadel | Alba Iulia, Alba County |
| 4 | Dacian Fortresses of the Orăștie Mountains | Orăștie Mountains, Hunedoara County & Alba County |
| 5 | Iași Palace of Culture | Iași, Iași County |
| 6 | Churches of Moldavia | Suceava County |
| 7 | Sibiu | Sibiu, Sibiu County |

=== Imperator Travel's Seven Wonders ===
| Number | Wonder | Location |
|---|---|---|
| 1 | Bran Castle | Bran, Brașov County |
| 2 | Corvin Castle | Hunedoara, Hunedoara County |
| 3 | Merry Cemetery | Săpânța, Maramureș County |
| 4 | Peleș Castle | Sinaia, Prahova Valley |
| 5 | Transfăgărășan Road | Făgăraș Mountains |
| 6 | Salina Turda | Turda, Cluj County |
| 7 | Voroneț Monastery | Churches of Moldavia, Bukovina, Suceava County |

=== Seven Wonders' Wonders of Romania ===
| Number | Wonder | Location |
|---|---|---|
| 1 | Corvin Castle | Hunedoara, Hunedoara County |
| 2 | Central University Library of Bucharest | Bucharest |
| 3 | Bran Castle | Bran, Brașov County |
| 4 | Palace of the Parliament | Bucharest |
| 5 | Peleș Castle | Sinaia, Prahova Valley |
| 6 | Făgăraș Citadel | Făgăraș, Brașov County |
| 7 | Romanian Athenaeum | Bucharest |
| 8 | Rock sculpture of Decebalus | Iron Gates, Orșova, Mehedinți County |
| 9 | Iron Gates | Danube River, Orșova, Mehedinți County |
| 10 | Basarab Overpass | Bucharest |
| 11 | Heroes' Cross on Caraiman Peak | Bucegi Mountains, Carpathian Mountains |
| 12 | Bigăr Waterfall | Bozovici, Caraș-Severin County |
| 13 | Mausoleum of Mărășești | Mărășești, Vrancea County |

== Gallery ==
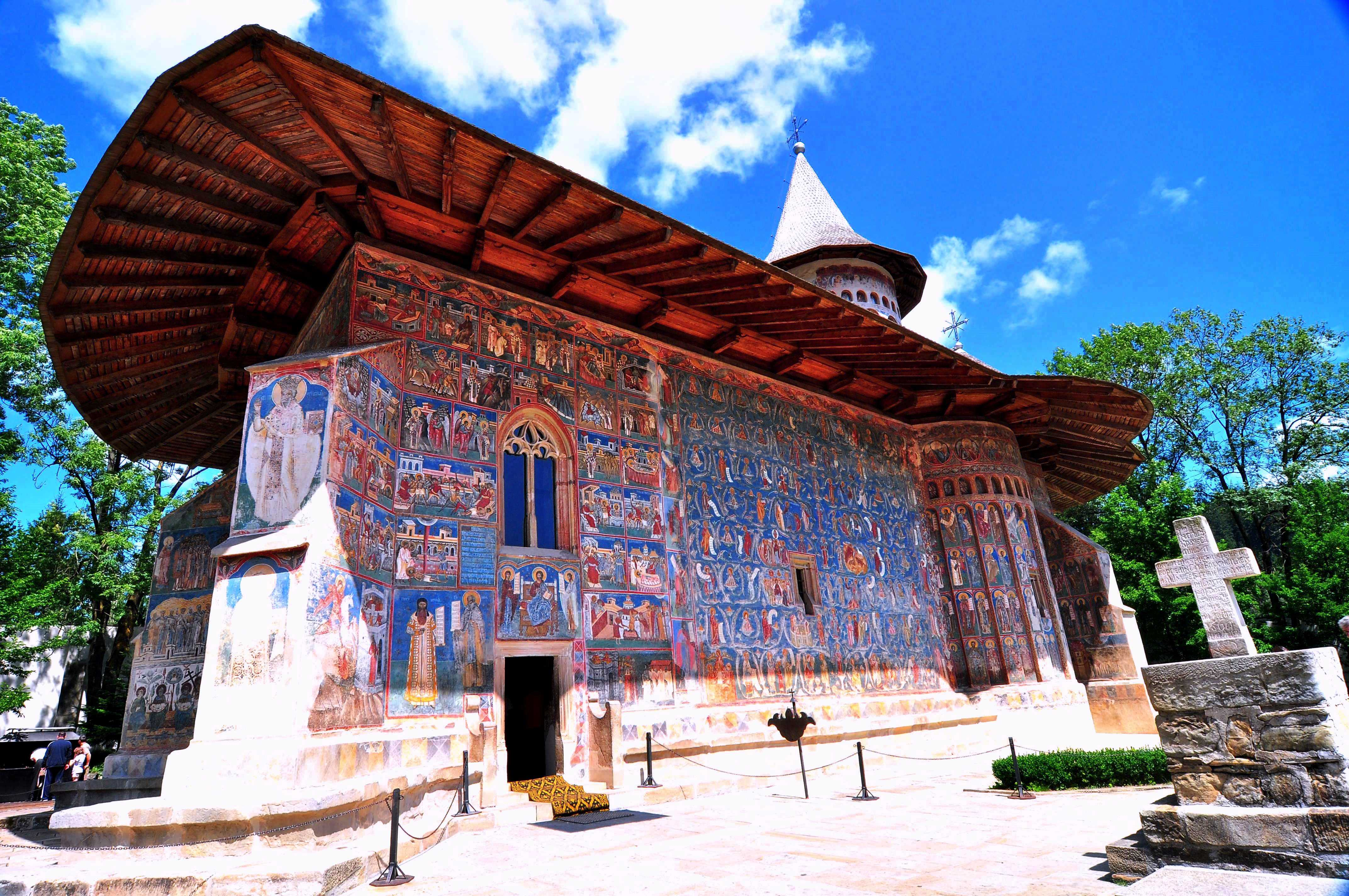
The Voroneț Monastery of the painted monasteries in Suceava

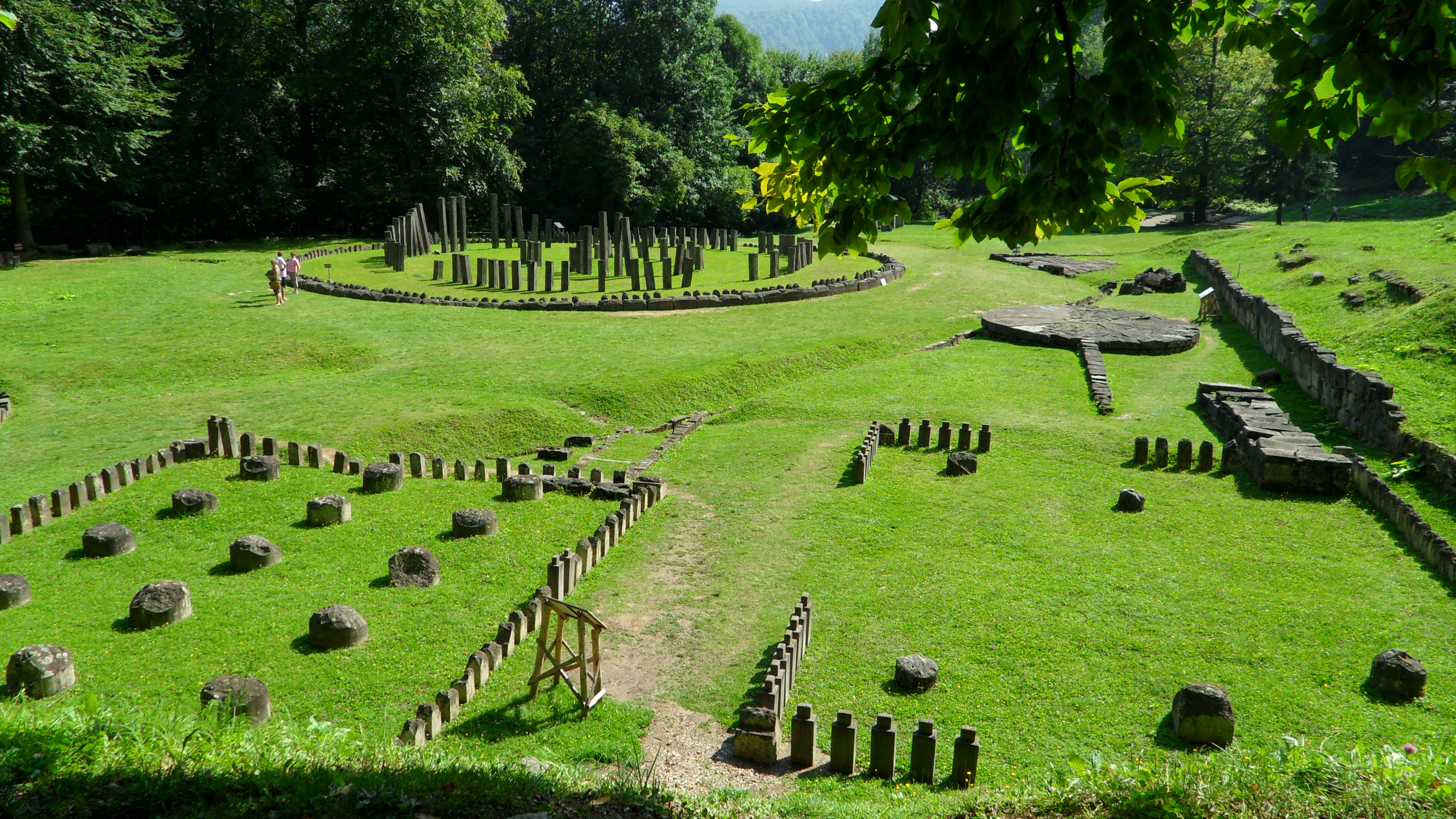
Sarmizegetusa Regia Dacian Fortress

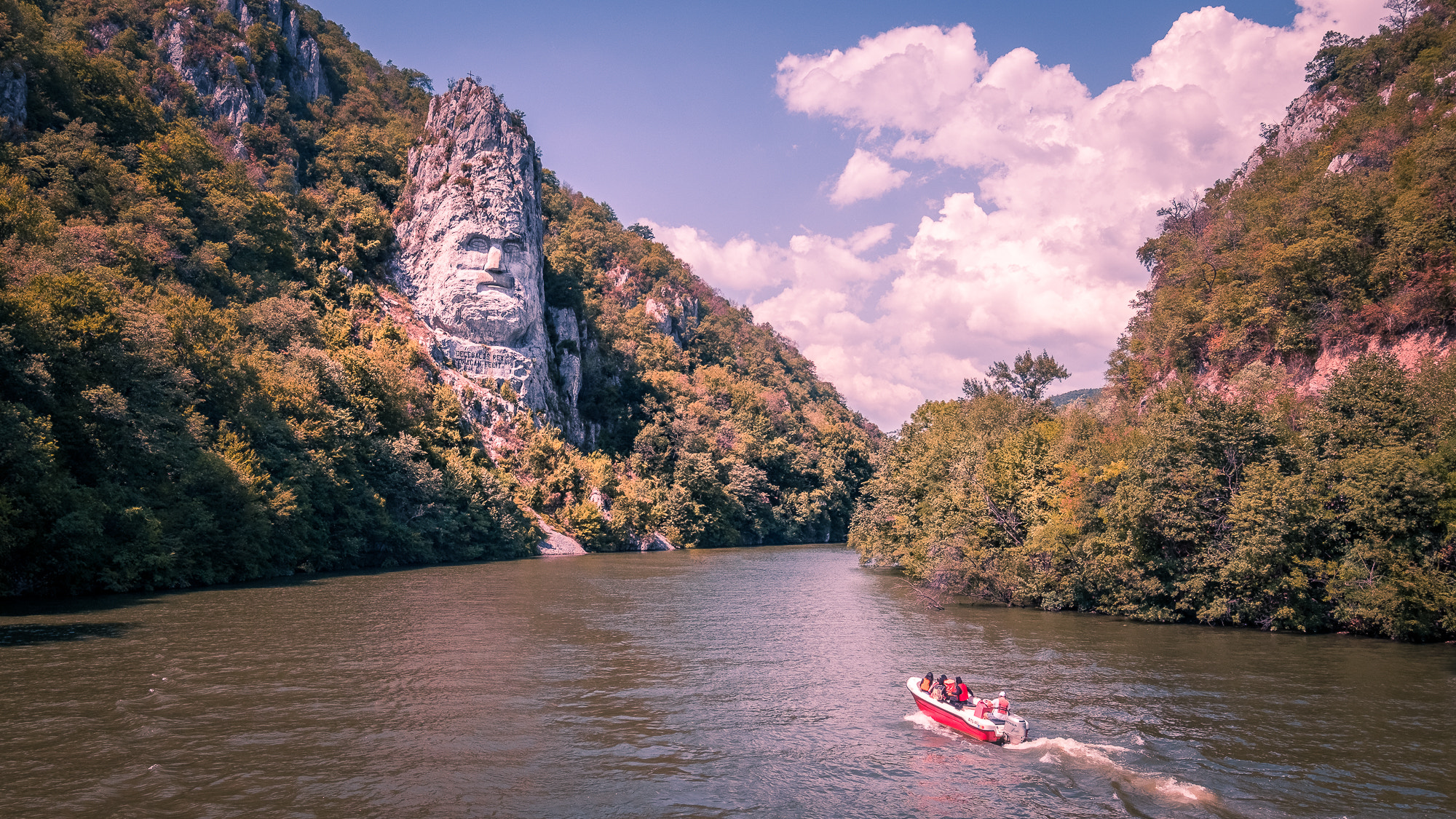
Rock Sculpture of King Decebalus

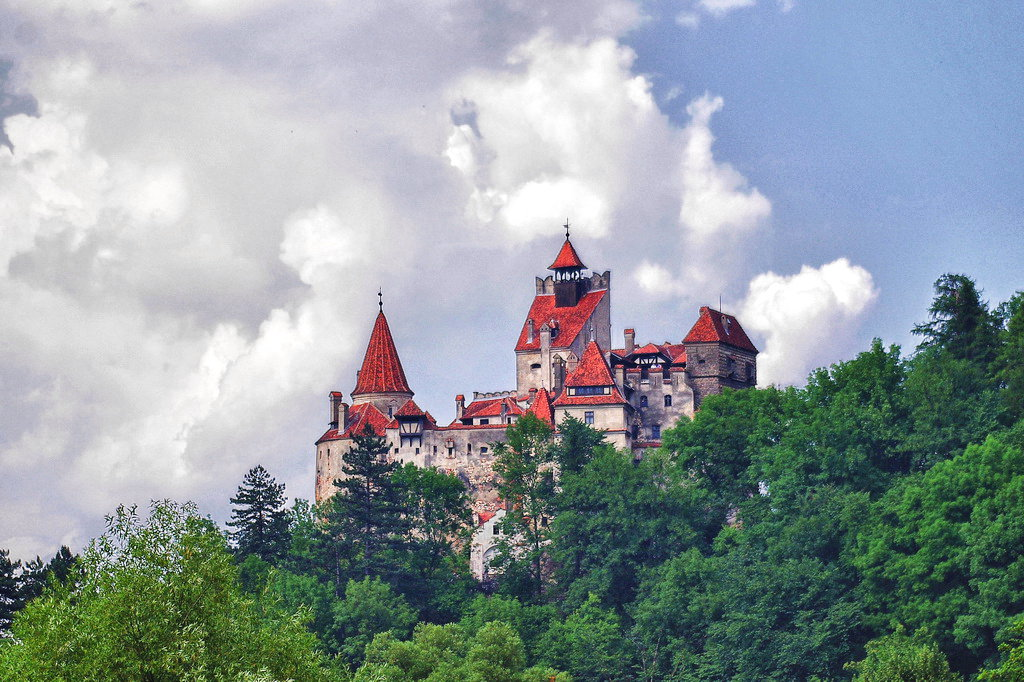
Bran Castle

Transfăgărășan road

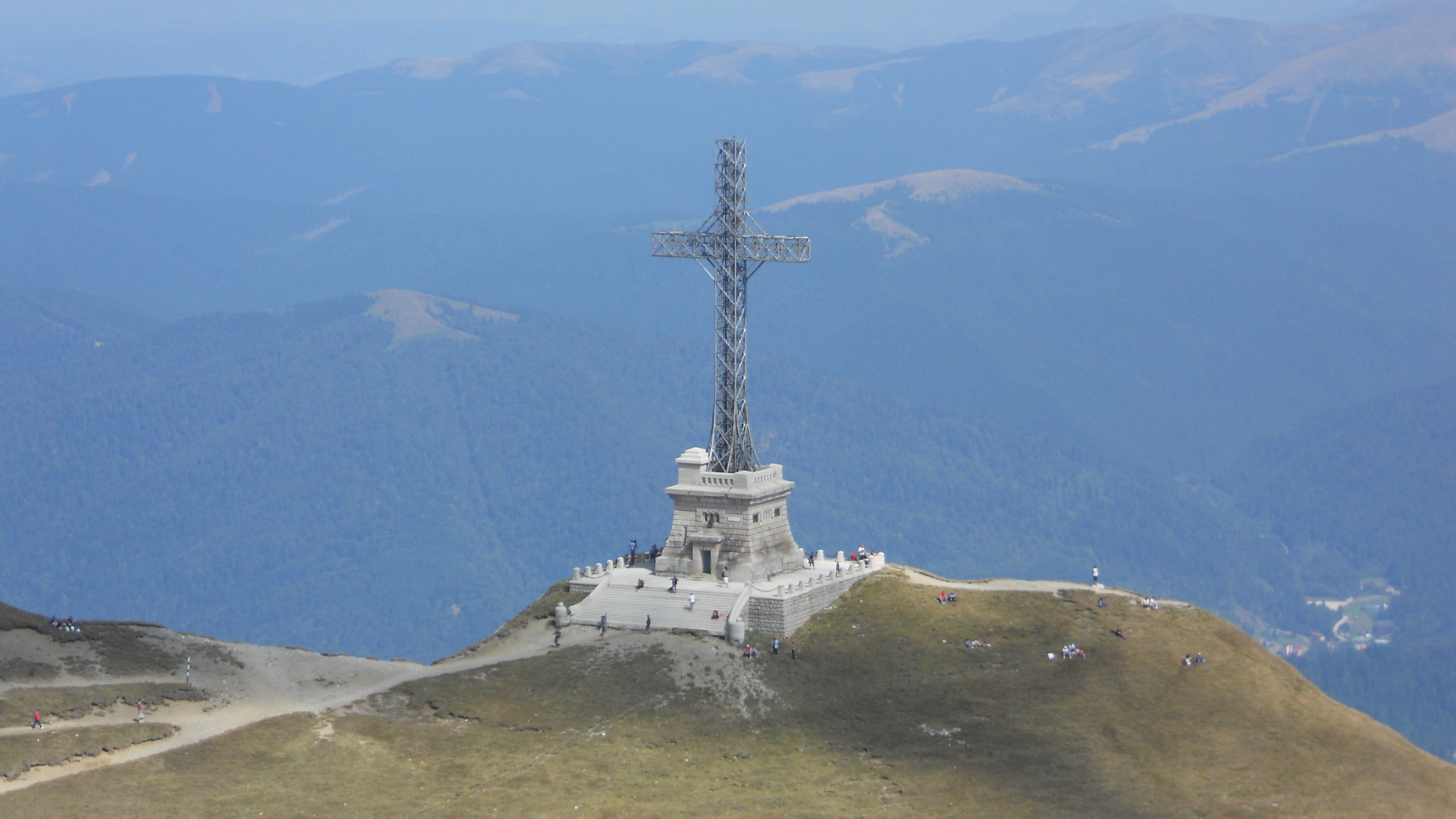
Heroes' Cross on Caraiman Peak

== See also ==
- Seven Wonders of the World
- Tourism in Romania
- Seven Natural Wonders of Romania
