= Ovidiu Cornel Hanganu =

Romanian footballer

Ovidiu Hanganu
Personal information
- Full name: Ovidiu Cornel Hanganu
- Date of birth: 12 May 1970 (age 56)
- Place of birth: Ghelari, Romania
- Position: Forward

Senior career*
Years	Team	Apps	(Gls)
1986–1992	Corvinul Hunedoara	118	(49)
1989	→ Victoria București (loan)	16	(2)
1992–1993	Dinamo București	33	(12)
1993–1994	Cercle Brugge	22	(5)
1993	→ Samsunspor (loan)	8	(1)
1995–1996	Național București	22	(4)
1996–1997	Corvinul Hunedoara	9	(1)
1997–1999	Petrolul Țicleni		
2001–2002	Minerul Certej		
Total		228	(74)

International career
1989–1991	Romania U21	15	(2)
1989–1990	Romania Olympic	3	(1)
1990–1992	Romania B	3	(2)
1991–1993	Romania	12	(2)
- * Club domestic league appearances and goals

Ovidiu Cornel Hanganu (born 12 May 1970) is a Romanian former professional footballer who played as a forward for Corvinul Hunedoara, Victoria București, Dinamo București, Național București, Cercle Brugge and Samsunspor. He earned 12 caps for Romania, scoring two goals.

== Club career ==
=== Corvinul Hunedoara and Victoria București ===
Hanganu was born on 12 May 1970 in Ghelari, Romania. He began playing football at Corvinul Hunedoara, making his Divizia A debut on 12 October 1986 under coach Octavian Cojocaru in a 3–0 victory against Jiul Petroșani. In 1989, Hanganu joined Victoria București, where coach Florin Halagian used him in both legs of the 4–2 aggregate loss to Valencia in the first round of the 1989–90 UEFA Cup, a tie in which he scored once. Subsequently, he returned to Corvinul and became the top-scorer of the 1990–91 season with 24 goals, exceeding half of the team's total of 47. However, he was unable to help the team avoid relegation in the following season.

=== Dinamo București ===
In the 1992–93 season, Hanganu played for Dinamo București and scored 12 league goals to help them finish second. Among these were two hat-tricks against Progresul București and CSM Reșița, and another goal in a 1–1 draw against rivals Steaua București. Furthermore, he helped them get past Kuusysi Lahti in the first round of the 1992–93 Champions League. Dinamo faced Olympique Marseille in the second round, where they drew 0–0 in the first leg. During the match, Hanganu squandered several key scoring chances—most notably a one-on-one with goalkeeper Fabien Barthez—drawing harsh criticism from Dinamo official Vasile Ianul: "It ended 0–0 only because Selymes and Hanganu missed huge chances. That fool Hanganu had a golden opportunity off an impeccable cross from Kádár." They lost the subsequent game 2–0, and the French ultimately won the competition.

=== Cercle Brugge and Samsunspor ===
In 1993, Hanganu along with teammates Dorinel Munteanu, Tibor Selymes and Marius Cheregi transferred from Dinamo to Cercle Brugge. However, he was shortly afterwards loaned to Samsunspor, where he became a teammate of compatriots Daniel Timofte and Silvian Dobre. He made his Süper Lig debut on 29 August 1993 under coach Gheorghe Mulțescu in a 3–0 victory over Karabükspor, managing to score about one week later in a 1–1 draw against Galatasaray. Hanganu returned to Cercle Brugge, making his Belgian First Division debut on 19 December 1993 under coach Georges Leekens in a 2–2 draw against Gent. He scored his first goal in the competition on 28 August 1994 in a 2–1 win against Anderlecht and then netted a brace on 31 August in a 2–1 success over Seraing.

=== Late career ===
In 1995, Hanganu signed with Național București, helping the club earn a runner-up position at the end of the 1995–96 season. He made his last Divizia A appearance on 29 November 1995 in Național's 3–1 away loss to Gloria Bistrița, totaling 189 matches with 67 goals in the competition. Afterwards, he returned to Corvinul in Divizia B. He ended his career in 2002, after playing a few years in the Romanian lower leagues for teams such as Petrolul Țicleni and Minerul Certej.

== International career ==
From 1989 to 1992, Hanganu was consistently featured for Romania's under-21, Olympic and B sides.

Hanganu played 12 matches and scored two goals for Romania, making his debut on 23 May 1991 under coach Mircea Rădulescu in a 1–0 friendly loss to Norway. He made three appearances and scored one goal in a 4–1 away win over Cyprus in the 1994 World Cup qualifiers. During those qualifiers, he also made his last appearance for Romania in a 5–2 away loss to Czechoslovakia.

== Style of play ==
Cornel Dinu, Hanganu's former coach at the national team, described his style of play and personality as follows: "He was an introvert, very withdrawn, but as a footballer, he was a player with great driving power who relied heavily on service from his teammates. Otherwise, he went unnoticed and didn't bother anyone. I think he was dealing with inner struggles. I remember him as an opportunistic striker with a knack for scoring and an innate intuition—qualities that helped him become a top scorer."

== Career statistics ==
=== International ===
Appearances and goals by national team and year
National team	Year	Apps	Goals
Romania
Romania	1991	3	0
Romania	1992	4	1
Romania	1993	5	1
Romania	Total	12	2

Scores and results list Romania's goal tally first, score column indicates score after each Hanganu goal.

List of international goals scored by Ovidiu Hanganu
No.	Date	Venue	Opponent	Score	Result	Competition
1	29 November 1992	Antonis Papadopoulos Stadium, Larnaca, Cyprus	Cyprus	4–1	4–1	1994 World Cup qualifiers
2	3 February 1993	Estadio Nacional, Lima, Peru	Peru	1–0	2–0	Friendly match

== Honours ==
Dinamo București

- Divizia A runner-up: 1992–93

Național București

- Divizia A runner-up: 1995–96

Individual

- Divizia A top scorer: 1990–91
