= Daniel Timofte =

Romanian footballer and manager

Personal information
- Date of birth: 1 October 1967 (age 59)
- Place of birth: Lonea, Romania
- Height: 1.82 m (6 ft 0 in)
- Position: Attacking midfielder

Youth career
- 1976–1979: Corvinul Hunedoara
- 1979–1986: Jiul Petroșani

Senior career*
| Years | Team | Apps | (Gls) |
| 1986–1989 | Jiul Petroșani (Note: The statistics for the 1987–88 and 1988–89 Divizia B seasons are not available.) | 69 | (11) |
| 1989–1990 | Dinamo București | 35 | (10) |
| 1991–1992 | Bayer Uerdingen | 28 | (1) |
| 1992–1993 | Dinamo București | 26 | (0) |
| 1993–1999 | Samsunspor | 127 | (18) |
| 1999–2000 | Dinamo București | 6 | (0) |
| Total | | 291 | (40) |

International career
| 1990–1995 | Romania | 22 | (2) |

Managerial career
- 2005: Jiul Petroșani (assistant)
- 2006: Sportul Studențesc (assistant)
- 2006: Sportul Studențesc (caretaker)
- 2006: Vaslui (assistant)
- 2008–2009: Jiul Petroșani
- 2010: CF Brăila
- 2010–2011: CF Brăila
- 2011: Sportul Studențesc (caretaker)
- 2012: Astra Ploiești (assistant)
- 2013: Sportul Studențesc
- 2013: Dinamo București (assistant)
- 2014: Petrolul Ploiești (assistant)
- 2015–2016: Voluntari (assistant)
- 2016–2017: Universitatea Craiova (assistant)
- 2018: Astra Giurgiu (assistant)
- 2018: Astra Giurgiu (assistant)
- 2019: Petrolul Ploiești (assistant)
- * Club domestic league appearances and goals

Daniel Timofte (born 1 October 1967) is a Romanian professional football manager and former player who played as an attacking midfielder.

== Club career ==
=== Jiul Petroșani ===
Timofte was born on 1 October 1967 in Lonea, Hunedoara County, Romania and began playing junior-level football in 1976 at Corvinul Hunedoara, moving three years later to Jiul Petroșani. On 31 August 1986 he made his Divizia A debut, playing for Jiul under coach Gheorghe Mulțescu in a 3–1 home victory against Chimia Râmnicu Vâlcea. The team was relegated at the end of his first season, but Timofte stayed with the club, helping it get promoted back to the first league after two years.

=== Dinamo București ===
In the summer of 1989, Timofte had offers from Dinamo București and Steaua București. He chose to play for the former, because they were building a team composed of mainly young players like himself, and also the coach that promoted him to the senior squad at Jiul, Mulțescu, advised him to do so. In his first season at Dinamo, the club won The Double, with Timofte being used by coach Mircea Lucescu in 20 league matches in which he scored eight goals, including one in a 3–0 derby win over Steaua. He was also introduced in the 57th minute to replace Anton Doboș in the 6–4 victory in the Cupa României final against Steaua. In the same season, he played eight games in the 1989–90 European Cup Winners' Cup campaign as the club reached the semi-finals where they were eliminated after a 2–0 aggregate loss to Anderlecht.

=== Bayer Uerdingen ===
In the middle of the following season, Timofte left Dinamo and joined Bayer Uerdingen, making his Bundesliga debut on 23 February 1991 when coach Friedhelm Konietzka played him for the entire match in a 0–0 draw against Nürnberg. The team was relegated at the end of his first season, but he stayed with the club, helping it gain promotion back after one year. During his period spent in Germany he was teammates with fellow Romanian Michael Klein.

=== Dinamo and Samsunspor ===
Timofte returned to Dinamo for the 1992–93 season, finishing runner-up in the league. Afterwards, he went to play in Turkey at Samsunspor alongside compatriots Bogdan Stelea, Marius Cheregi, Ovidiu Hanganu, Silvian Dobre and Luca Constantin, being coached by Gheorghe Mulțescu. His debut in the Turkish league took place on 29 August 1993 in a 3–0 away win over Karabükspor. He scored his first goal in the competition on 10 October in a 3–2 away victory against Altay Izmir. Timofte netted six goals until the end of the 1993–94 season, including a brace in a 4–0 win against Bursaspor. In his six-season spell with Samsunspor, he made a total of 127 league appearances with 18 goals scored, and won the 1993–94 Balkans Cup.

Subsequently, Timofte returned for a third and final spell at Dinamo, with whom he managed to win The Double in the 1999–2000 season, being used by coach Cornel Dinu in six league games. Timofte played a total of 98 matches with 15 goals in Divizia A and 24 games in European competitions (including seven matches in the Intertoto Cup).

== International career ==
Timofte has 22 appearances with two goals scored for Romania, making his debut on 28 March 1990 under coach Emerich Jenei in a friendly that ended with a 3–1 away victory against Egypt in which he scored once.

Jenei used him in three games in the 1990 World Cup final tournament, as the team reached the round of 16 where the campaign ended after a 0–0 (5–4, after penalty kicks) loss to Ireland in which at the penalty shootout his strike was the only one defended by goalkeeper Packie Bonner. That penalty miss followed him when he went with Dinamo to play against Irish club St Patrick's Athletic in the 1990–91 European Cup, the Irish fans gave him mocking cheers for his shootout miss. After he ended his career, Timofte opened a number of bars in Petroșani, the first being named "Penalty", and also Packie Bonner named his boat "Timofte".

In the following years he played four games in the Euro 1992 qualifiers in which he scored once in a 3–1 away win over San Marino. He also played in a 1–1 draw against Czechoslovakia during the 1994 World Cup qualifiers. Subsequently, he made four appearances in the Euro 1996 qualifiers, including his last one for The Tricolours on 26 April 1995 in a 4–1 away win over Azerbaijan.

For representing his country at the 1990 World Cup, Timofte was decorated by President of Romania Traian Băsescu on 25 March 2008 with the Ordinul "Meritul Sportiv" – (The Medal "The Sportive Merit") class III.

== Managerial career ==
Timofte spent most of his coaching career as an assistant of Gheorghe Mulțescu at various teams from Romanian football, including giants Dinamo București. In the 2007–08 season he was Dorinel Munteanu's assistant at Vaslui.

He had spells as head coach at Sportul Studențesc, Jiul Petroșani and CF Brăila. With Sportul he worked in the first league, while with Jiul he activated in the second one and with Brăila he managed to earn promotion from the third to the second league in the 2009–10 season.

== Personal life ==
In 2016, Timofte received the Honorary Citizen of Petroșani title.

== Career statistics ==
Appearances and goals by national team and year
| National team | Year | Apps | Goals |
|---|---|---|---|
| Romania | 1990 | 7 | 1 |
| Romania | 1991 | 4 | 1 |
| Romania | 1992 | 2 | 0 |
| Romania | 1993 | 4 | 0 |
| Romania | 1994 | 4 | 0 |
| Romania | 1995 | 1 | 0 |
| Total | | 22 | 2 |

Scores and results list Romania's goal tally first, score column indicates score after each Timofte goal.

List of international goals scored by Daniel Timofte
| # | Date | Venue | Cap | Opponent | Score | Result | Competition |
|---|---|---|---|---|---|---|---|
| 1 | 28 March 1990 | Cairo International Stadium, Cairo, Egypt | 1 | Egypt | 1–1 | 3–1 | Friendly |
| 2 | 27 March 1991 | Stadio Olimpico, Serravalle, San Marino | 8 | San Marino | 3–1 | 3–1 | Euro 1992 qualifiers |

== Honours ==
=== Player ===
Jiul Petroșani

- Divizia B: 1988–89

Dinamo București

- Divizia A: 1989–90, 1999–2000
- Cupa României: 1989–90, 1999–2000

Bayer Uerdingen

- 2. Bundesliga: 1991–92

Samsunspor

- Balkans Cup: 1993–94

=== Coach ===
CF Brăila

- Liga III: 2009–10
