= Zlaști =

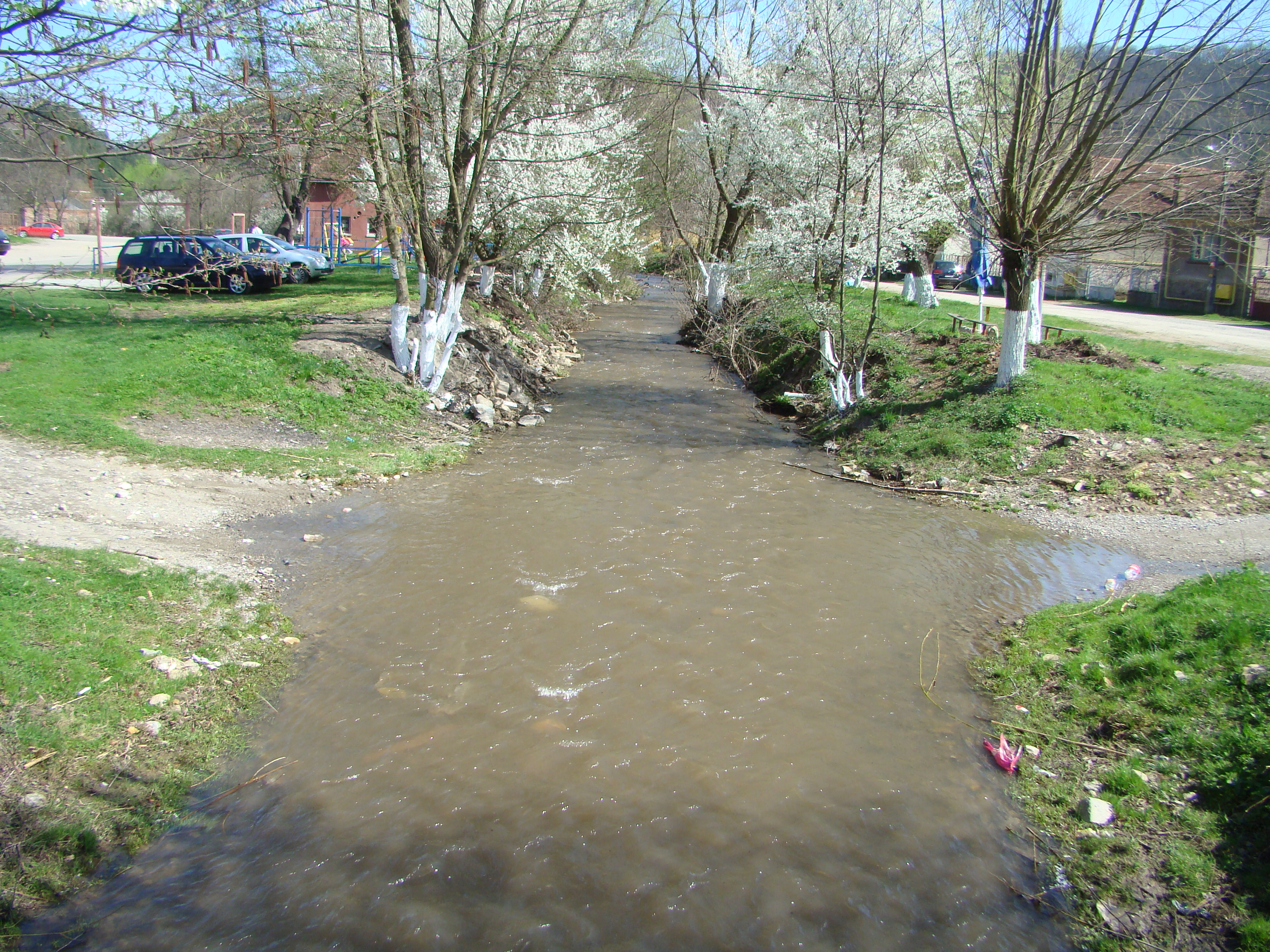

- Location within Romania

Location
- Country: Romania
- Counties: Hunedoara County
- Villages: Groș, Boș, Zlaști

Physical characteristics
- Mouth: Cerna
  - location: Hunedoara
  - coordinates: 45.7491°N 22.8931°E
- Length: 33 km (21 mi)
- Basin size: 79 km^{2} (31 sq mi)

Basin features
- Progression: Cerna→ Mureș→ Tisza→ Danube→ Black Sea

The Zlaști is a left tributary of the river Cerna in Romania. It discharges into the Cerna in the city Hunedoara. Its length is 33 km (21 mi) and its basin size is 79 km^{2} (31 sq mi).
