= Silvian Dobre =

Romanian footballer

Personal information
- Date of birth: 4 December 1967 (age 58)
- Place of birth: Bucharest, Romania
- Position: Midfielder

Youth career
- 1984–1986: Sportul Studențesc București

Senior career*
Years	Team	Apps	(Gls)
1988–1990	Sportul Studențesc București	35	(3)
1990–1992	Corvinul Hunedoara	61	(8)
1992–1993	Sportul Studențesc București	33	(5)
1993–1994	Samsunspor	9	(1)
1994	FC Brașov	12	(1)
1995–1998	Sportul Studențesc București	75	(3)
1999	Electro-Turris Turnu Măgurele		
2004–2005	Romprim București		
2012–2015	GVD București		
Total		225	(21)
- * Club domestic league appearances and goals

Silvian Dobre (born 4 December 1967) is a Romanian former footballer who played as a midfielder.

== Career ==
Dobre was born on 4 December 1967 in Bucharest, Romania. He began playing junior-level football at local club Sportul Studențesc, winning the 1985–86 national youth championship. Dobre made his Divizia A debut on 7 December 1988 under coach Mircea Dridea in a 1–0 loss to Bihor Oradea. In 1990, he joined Corvinul Hunedoara but could not avoid the team's relegation at the end of the 1991–92 season. Subsequently, he returned to Sportul Studențesc for the 1992–93 season. In 1993, Dobre went to play in Turkey at Samsunspor alongside compatriots Marius Cheregi, Daniel Timofte, Ovidiu Hanganu and Luca Constantin. He made his Süper Lig debut on 29 August 1993 under coach Gheorghe Mulțescu in a 1–1 draw against Galatasaray. On 26 September, he scored his first goal in the competition in a 1–1 draw against Gaziantepspor. That was his only goal in his nine Süper Lig appearances, and the team also won the 1993–94 Balkans Cup. Afterwards, Dobre returned to Romania to play for FC Brașov in the 1994–95 season. Midway through that season, he made a comeback at Sportul Studențesc where he made his last Divizia A appearances, totaling 213 matches with 20 goals in the competition. After Sportul's relegation at the end of the 1997–98 season, Dobre played in the Romanian lower leagues for teams such as Electro-Turris Turnu Măgurele and Romprim București, retiring in 2005. In 2012, Dobre returned to the field, playing in the Romanian fourth league for GVD București. The team was composed mostly of former professional football players, including Miodrag Belodedici, Tom Cristea, Daniel Iftodi, Bogdan Andone, and Costel Mozacu.

== Honours ==
Samsunspor

- Balkans Cup: 1993–94
