= Corvin Castle =

15th-century castle in Romania

- Castelul Corvinilor, Vajdahunyadi vár
- Hunedoara in Romania
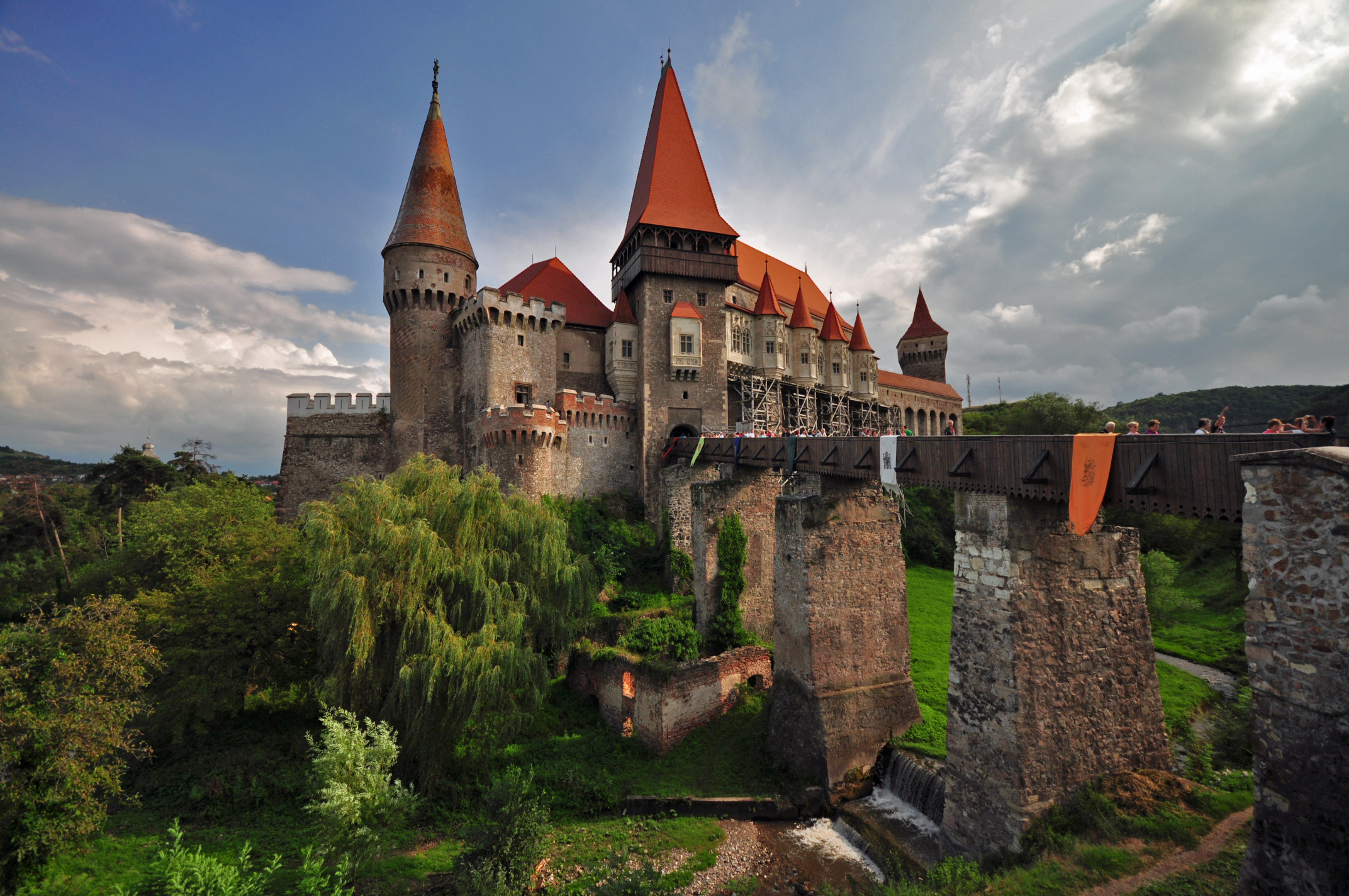
- The castle

Site information
- Type: Castle
- Owner: Ministry of Culture Notable owners: John Hunyadi (1419–56); Matthias Corvinus (1457–82); Gabriel Bethlen (1605, 1613–29)
- Open to the public: 12 pm to 8 pm on Mondays and 9 am–8 pm on Tuesdays–Sundays
- Condition: Renovated
- Website: Official website

Location
- Coordinates: 45°44′57″N 22°53′18″E

Site history
- Built: 15th century (royal castra); 1440–1446 (first phase); 1458–1480 (second phase); 17th century (third phase); 19th century (fourth phase)

Corvin Castle, also known as Hunyadi Castle or Hunedoara Castle (Romanian: Castelul Huniazilor or Castelul Corvinilor; Hungarian: Vajdahunyadi vár), is a Gothic-Renaissance castle in Hunedoara, current-day Romania. It is considered one of the largest castles in Europe and is one of the Seven Wonders of Romania.

== History ==
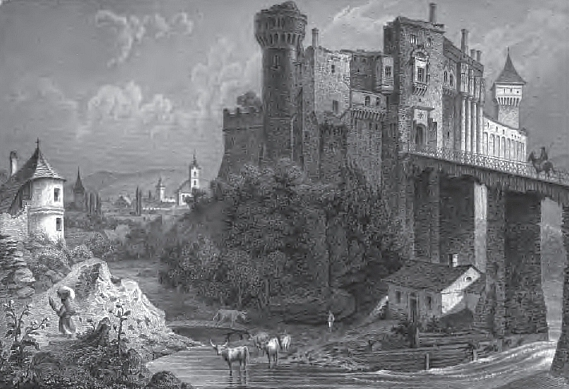
The ruins of the castle in 1865

Corvin Castle was laid out in 1446, when construction began by order of Voivode of Transylvania John Hunyadi (Hungarian: Hunyadi János, Romanian: Iancu or Ioan de Hunedoara), who wanted to transform the former keep built by Charles I of Hungary. The castle was originally given to John Hunyadi's father, Woyk (Vajk, Voicu), by Sigismund of Luxembourg, king of Hungary and Croatia, as a severance in 1409. It was also in 1446 that John Hunyadi was elected as the regent governor by the Diet.

The castle has three large areas: the Knight's Hall, the Diet Hall, and the circular stairway. The halls are rectangular in shape and are decorated with marble. The Diet Hall was used for ceremonies or formal receptions, whilst the Knight's Hall was used for feasts. In 1456, John Hunyadi died, and work on the castle stagnated. Starting with 1458, new commissions were being undertaken to construct the Matia Wing of the castle. In 1480, work was completely stopped on the castle, and it was recognised as being one of the biggest and most impressive buildings in Eastern Europe.

The 16th century did not bring any improvements to the castle, but during the 17th century, new additions were made for aesthetic and military purposes. Aesthetically, the large new palace was built facing the town. A two-level building, it hosted living chambers and a large living area. For military purposes, two new towers were constructed: the White Tower and the Artillery Tower. Also, the external yard was added for administration and storage.

The current castle is the result of a fanciful restoration campaign undertaken after a disastrous fire and many decades of total neglect. Some considered that modern "architects projected to it their own wistful interpretations of how a great Gothic castle should look". In 2021, Corvin Castle attracted around 276,000 tourists.

== Structure ==
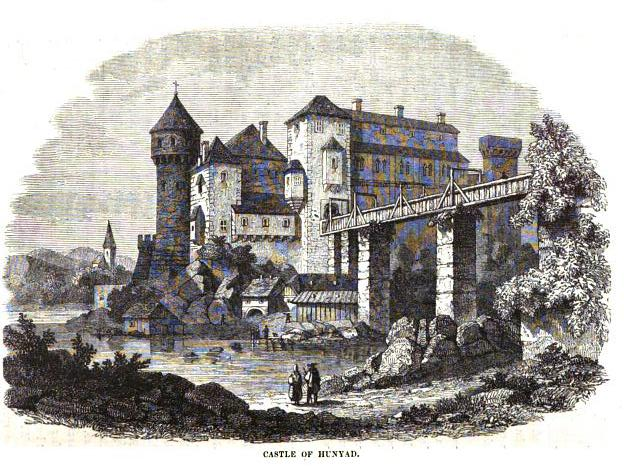
Drawing of the castle from the mid-19th century

Built in a Renaissance-Gothic style and constructed over the site of an older fortification on a rock above the smaller Zlaști River, the castle is a large and imposing structure with tall towers, bastions, an inner courtyard, diversely coloured roofs, and myriad windows and balconies adorned with stone carvings. The castle also features a double wall for enhanced fortification and is flanked by both rectangular and circular towers, an architectural innovation for the period's Transylvanian architecture. Some of the towers (the Capistrano Tower, the Deserted Tower, and the Drummers' Tower) were used as prisons. The Buzdugan Tower (named after a type of mace) was solely built for defensive purposes, and it had its exterior decorated with geometric motifs. The rectangular towers have large openings to accommodate larger weapons.

As one of the most important properties of John Hunyadi, the castle was transformed during his reign. It became a sumptuous home, not only a strategically enforced point. With the passing of the years, the masters of the castle had modified its look, adding towers, halls, and guest rooms. The gallery and the keep - the last defense tower (called "Neboisa" which means "Don't be afraid" in Serbo-Croatian), which remained unchanged from John Hunyadi's time, and the Capistrano Tower (named after the saint, Franciscan friar from the Battle of Belgrade in 1456) are some of the most significant parts of the construction. Other significant parts of the building are the Knights' Hall (a great reception hall), the Club Tower, the White bastion, which served as a food storage room, and the Diet Hall, on whose walls medallions are painted (among them there are portraits of Matei Basarab, rulers from Wallachia, and Vasile Lupu, ruler of Moldavia). In the wing of the castle called the Mantle, a painting can be seen which portrays the legend of the raven from which the name of the descendants of John Hunyadi, Corvinus came.

== Legacy ==
Tourists are told that it was the place where Vlad the Impaler, Prince of Wallachia, was held prisoner by John Hunyadi, Hungary's military leader and regent during the King's minority. Corvin Castle is sometimes mentioned as a source of inspiration for Castle Dracula in Bram Stoker's 1897 horror novel Dracula, although Stoker was unaware of the castle's connection to Vlad the Impaler.

The castle has served as a filming location for various films, including Singh Is Bliing,Dragonheart: Battle for the Heartfire, The Nun, and the 2024 Nosferatu remake.

== See also ==
- Tourism in Romania
- List of castles in Romania
- Seven Wonders of Romania
- Villages with fortified churches in Transylvania
