= Hunedoara =

- Municipality
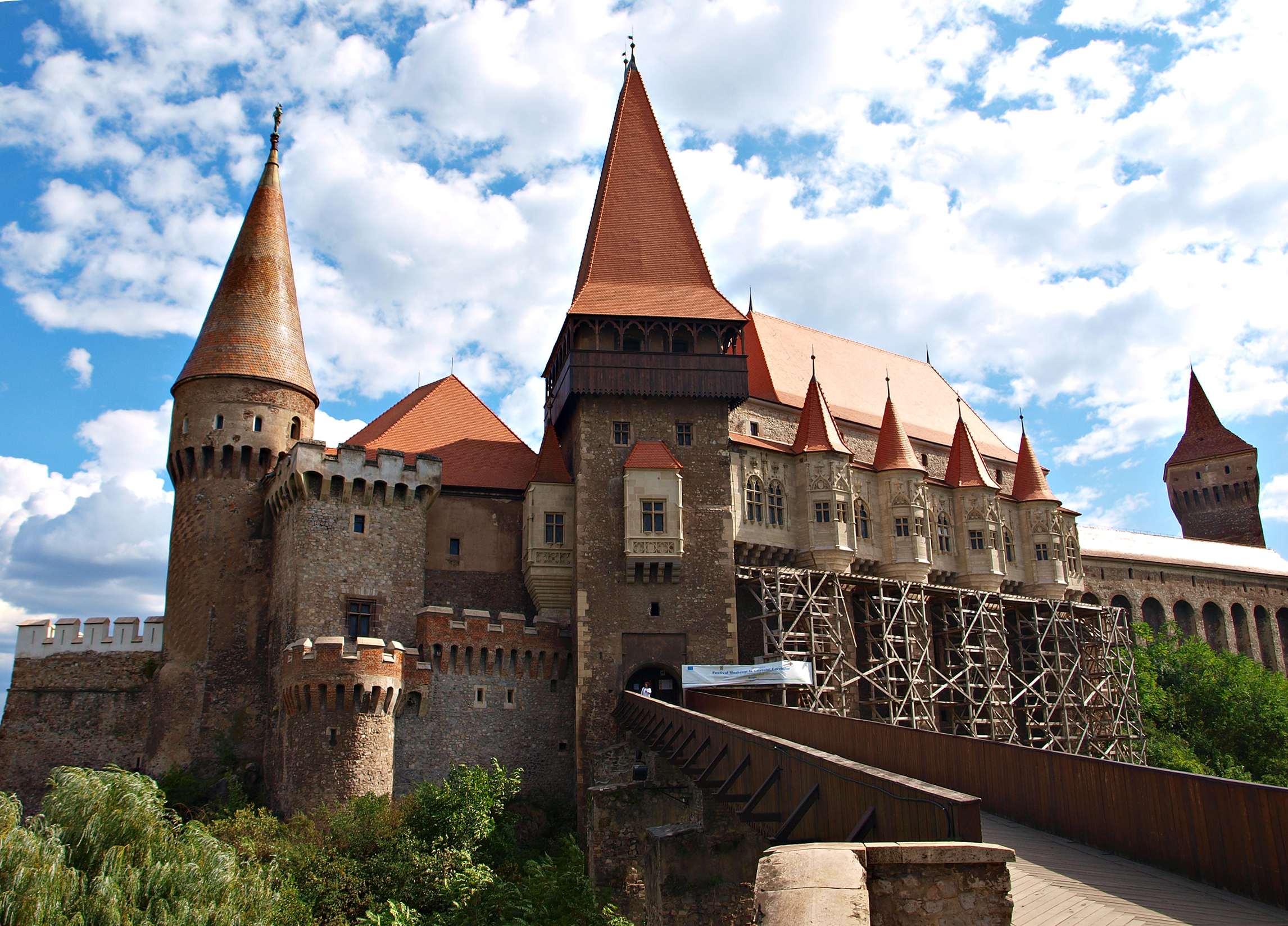
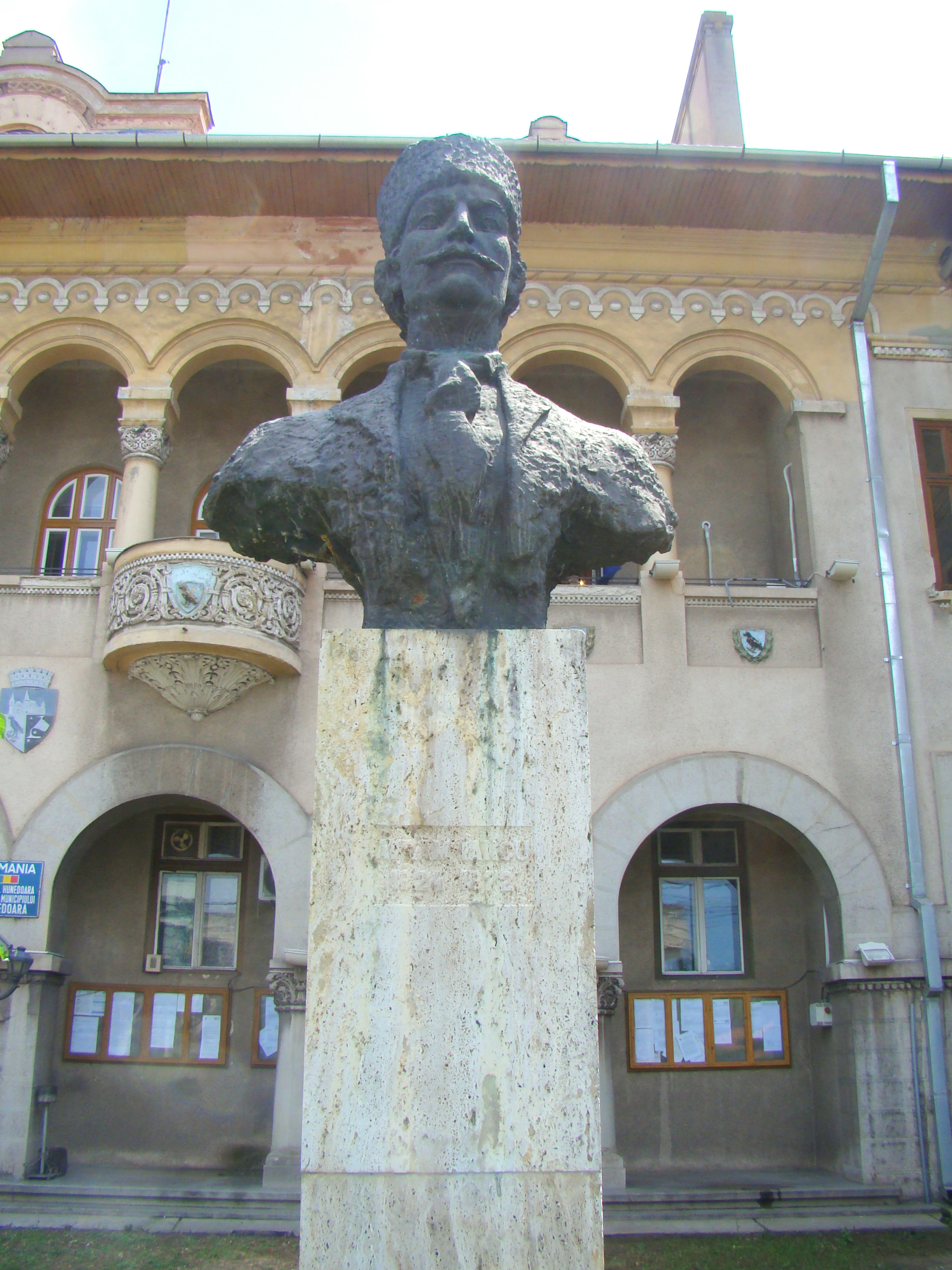
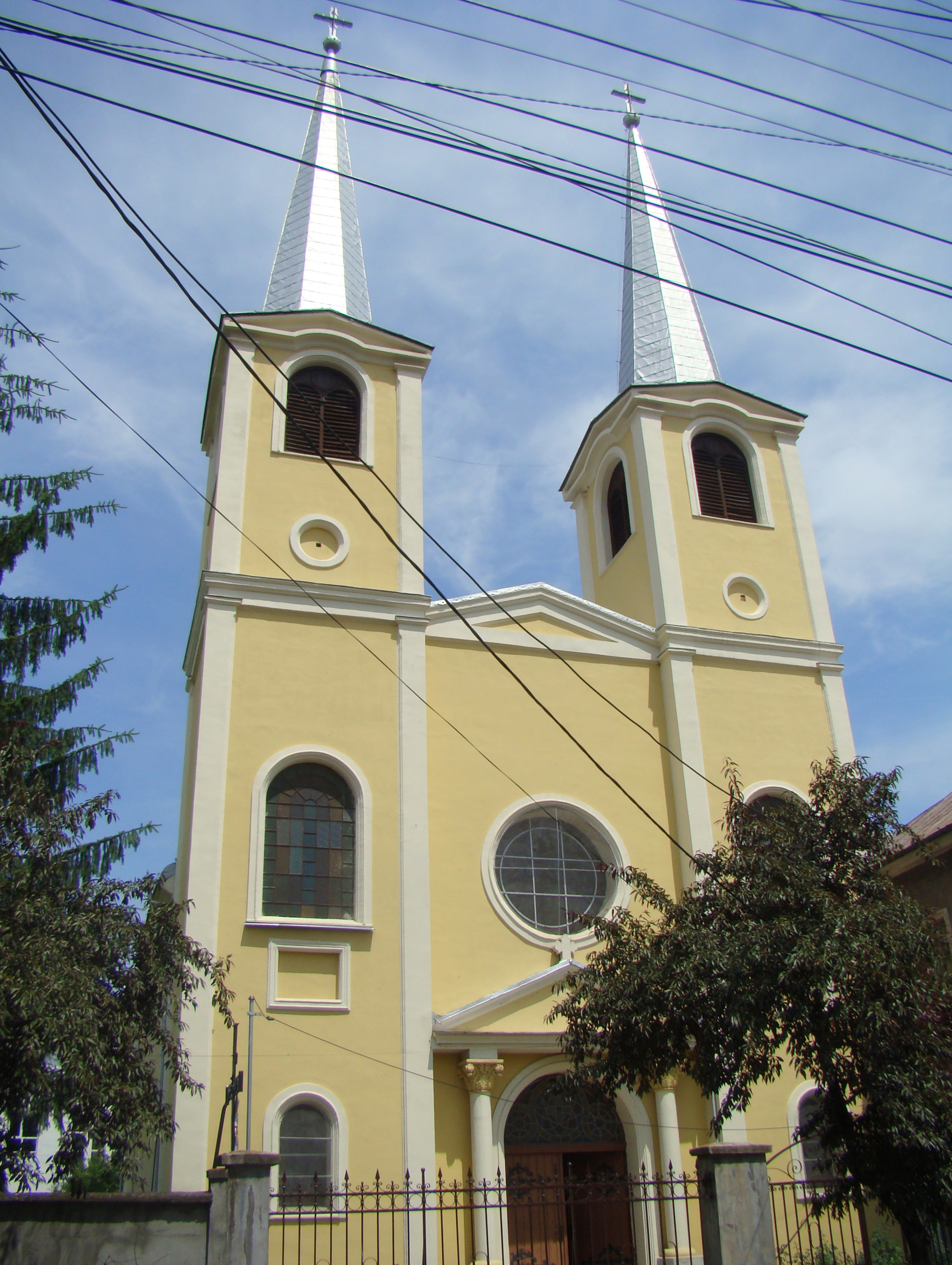
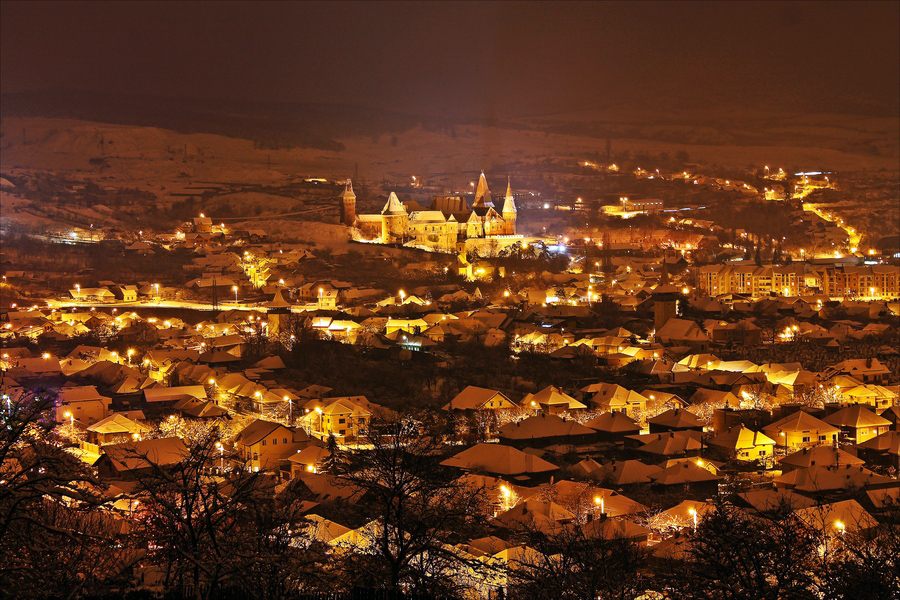
- Hunyadi Castle Bust of Avram Iancu in front of Hunedoara City Hall Roman Catholic Church Hunedoara by night, after a snowfall

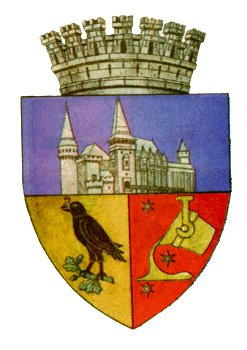
- Coat of arms

- Location in Hunedoara County

- Location in Romania
- Coordinates: 45°46′11″N 22°55′13″E
- Country: Romania
- County: Hunedoara

Government
  - Mayor (2024–2028): Dan Bobouțanu (PSD)
- Area: 97.30 km^{2} (37.57 sq mi)
- Elevation: 278 m (912 ft)
- Population (2021-12-01): 50,457
  - Density: 518.6/km^{2} (1,343/sq mi)
- Time zone: UTC+02:00 (EET)
  - Summer (DST): UTC+03:00 (EEST)
- Postal code: 331006–331167
- Area code: (+40) 02 54
- Vehicle reg.: HD
- Website: www.primariahunedoara.ro

Hunedoara (Romanian: [huneˈdo̯ara]; Hungarian: Vajdahunyad [ˈvɒjdɒhuɲɒd]; German: Eisenmarkt) is a city in Hunedoara County, Transylvania, Romania. It is located in southwestern Transylvania near the Poiana Ruscă Mountains, and administers five villages: Boș (Bós), Groș (Grós), Hășdat (Hosdát; Hochstätten), Peștișu Mare (Alpestes), and Răcăștia (Rákosd).

The city includes the most important Gothic-style secular building in Transylvania: the Hunyad Castle, which is closely connected with the Hunyadi family. The castle was destroyed by fire five times, but underwent many reconstructions from Austro-Hungarian and later Romanian authorities. Besides the castle, the town developed as a production center for iron and a market for the mountain regions nearby. During the 20th century, Hunedoara's population increased to 86,000 inhabitants. The city contained the largest steel works in Romania (until Galați took the lead), but activity gradually diminished after the Romanian revolution of 1989 due to the loss of the market. This was a blow to the overall prosperity of the town, which is now recovering through new investments.

The population consists of a Romanian majority, with Hungarians and Roma as the most important minorities. The city contains numerous parks, with poplars and chestnut trees flanking the streets. There are many tourist attractions, including a large dam with tourist facilities, located in the mountains a few kilometers from the city.

== Etymology ==
The name of the town seems inexorably linked to the name of the Hunyadi family (also known as Corvinus family, Hunyadi meaning "of/from Hunyad" in Hungarian). The most probable explanation for the Romanian name "Hunedoara" is the transliteration of the Hungarian name "Hunyadvár" meaning "Hunyad Castle", as many Hungarian towns have this suffix. Historically, the following names were recorded: Hungnod (1265), Huniad (1278), Hwnyadwar (1409), Vayda Hunyadi (1575). The latter Hungarian name Vajdahunyad meaning "Voivode Hunyad" is a direct referral to John Hunyadi, Voivode of Transylvania.

The German name "Eisenmarkt" means "Iron Market", doubtless a reference by German merchants to the city's thriving iron trade from Carpathian mines.

== History ==
Stone Age tools were discovered in the Sânpetru (Saint Peter) hill near the castle and in the surrounding villages. The region was very rich in iron, which had been extracted in the area since the Iron Age by Thracian tribes. The Dacian fortresses of Orăștie mountains, most notably Sarmiszegetusa, which became the most important religious and political center of Dacia, was located close to Hunedoara and was supplied by the iron produced here. The remains of eight Dacian iron furnaces have been found at the Sânpetru Hill near the castle. The discovery of important monetary treasures of Dacian coins and Roman imperial coins testifies to the importance of the site.

After Dacia was conquered around AD 106 and turned into a Roman province, the iron-rich region attracted the attention of the Romans, who began to exploit it by building furnaces. A "Villa Rustica" emerged in Teliuc, a Roman fortification on Sanpetru hill, outpost of the famous legio XIII Gemina whose main castrum was at Apullum in Dacia. Other Roman artifacts were discovered in the city area, and also in Pestis, where the remains of a Roman village were discovered. The new capital city of the Roman province of Dacia, Ulpia Traiana Sarmizegetusa, was also situated in the proximity. Whether a Romanized population remained in this region after the retreat of the Roman legions, which took place around 271-274 AD, is debated in the theories on the origin of the Romanians.

After the Roman military and administrative retreat during the Migration Period, the region had no significant historic sites, although it may be possible that the iron activity continued. The ethnic structure of the region changed significantly, most notably with Goths, Huns, Slavs, Pechenegs, Magyars (Hungarians), and Cumans.

Starting from the year 1003 Transylvania became part of the Hungarian Kingdom. The Gesta Hungarorum, the first historical Hungarian chronicle, written around the year 1200, claims that Transylvania was inhabited by Vlachs (Romanians) and Slavs upon Hungarians' arrival. However, the reliability of this work is contested by some scholars. In this area small political feuds grew ruled by the so called Knezes. South of the Carpathians the Pechenegs and Cumans held political power, and Hunedoara acted as a buffer zone for the Hungarian Crown. In time, the Vlach (Romanian) populations in the mountains nearby developed an original highlander culture. Their land is called "Țara Pădurenilor" (Woodlanders Country) and they began to dominate the area demographically. The region also had a sizable population of German Saxons, colonizers brought by the Hungarian Crown after the Mongol Invasion.

The first recorded evidence of the city was made in 1265 under the name Hungnod as a hub for leather tanning and wool processing. The city of Hunedoara became an important iron extracting and processing center in Transylvania. "Corpus Inscriptiorum Latinorum" refers to a local inhabitant as "natas ibi, ubi ferum nascitur", that is, "born where the iron was born". As the backbone for the manufacture of weapons and tools, the town industry was vital for the region.

The city has been known since the 14th century mainly as the residence of the Hungarian noble Hunyadi family, the origins of the Hunyadi family are a topic of debate among historians. On 18 October 1409, Voyk (Vajk in Hungarian, Voicu in Romanian), was rewarded for military bravery by Sigismund of Luxembourg, and received the domain of Hunedoara. The same document that recorded Voyk's reward for military bravery by Sigismund of Luxembourg also mentions his three sons: Mogoș, Radol, and John Hunyadi (Hungarian: János Hunyadi; Romanian: Ioan de Hunedoara). Hunedoara received town privileges in 1448 from the King of Hungary. John Hunyadi consolidated the citadel on top of an ancient fortress, creating the two main halls, for Diet and Knights. A Franciscan abbey was built nearby the castle in 1448 and John of Capistrano, a famous Italian monk, was sent by the Pope to organize a crusade against the Turks, and lived in the castle. John of Capistrano became instrumental later in inciting the peasantry to crusade, starting from Frankfurt and marching towards Belgrade.

John Hunyadi was a leading military leader in the growing confrontation with the Ottoman Empire. He fought in the service of Sigismund, mastering military tactics in the Hussite Wars, and became the most skillful warrior of Hungary. He was elevated and named Voivode (Prince) of Transylvania, which was at the time an autonomous part of the Kingdom of Hungary. Elected regent of Hungary, he formed a coalition with the principalities of Moldavia and Wallachia and engaged in crusades against the Turks to free Serbia and Bulgaria. The crusade, for a brief period, united the diverging forces of the Balkans, and the victories gained in battles managed to secure the Kingdom of Hungary from Ottoman occupation for over a century. Although he died in a military camp, his son Mátyás (Matthias Corvinus) later became the most famous of Hungarian kings. Pope Pius II called him Athleta Christi ("Christ's Champion") and The White Knight of Wallachia.

In 1457, Matthias gave permission to the Wallachian serfs to build an Orthodox church, beautifully decorated with paintings and preserved until today. He continued to consolidate the castle and the feudal domain of Hunedoara. The castle of Hunedoara became one of the biggest in the medieval world, standing as a witness to the greatness of his family of noble warriors and statesmen, in an era of war and despair for the region, as the Ottoman Empire approached Central Europe. In the times of Hunyadi rule, Hunedoara became a market (opiddum) for iron. Matthias Corvinus named the city a tax-free area, and this privilege lasted until the 17th century. The population varied between 784 people in 1512 and 896 people in the 17th century. After Matthias died, Hunedoara passed to his son, John (Hungarian: János; Romanian: Ioan), but he too died young. His wife, Beatrice de Frangepan, married Georg of Hohenzollern, Marquis of Brandenburg in 1509. But Georg de Brandenburg would not reside in Hunedoara, instead appointed a representative, György Stolcz.

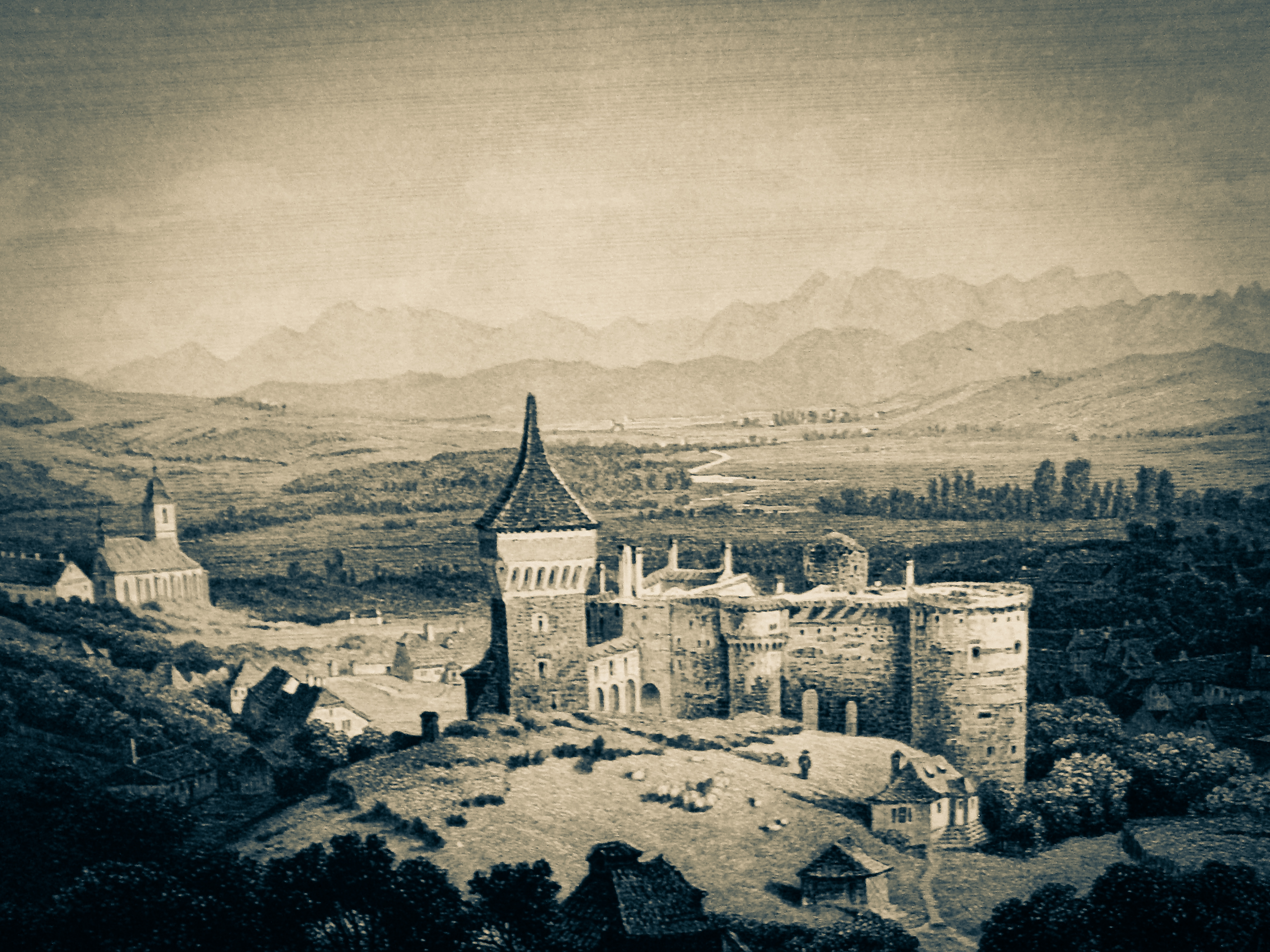
Hunedoara as depicted by Ludwig Rohbock (1820−1883)

In 1514, during the peasant revolt of György Dózsa, some were imprisoned in the castle and probably tortured. The town numbered 184 houses, a considerable size for the time, and was ruled by an appointed Orthodox priest. In 1528 a fire destroyed 124 houses. In 1534 as the Kingdom of Hungary was conquered by the Ottoman Turks, the castle was besieged during the rebellion of Czibak Imre, the bishop of Oradea and two years later John Zápolya donated the castle along with other possessions to Török Bálint making him the richest nobleman of Hungary. In 1557 Török János, a proselytizer of Reformation is mentioned to have killed his unfaithful wife Kendi Anna in the castle. In 1601 the castle was besieged by the Wallachian army of Michael the Brave in his campaign – while ruling Wallachia, Moldavia and Transylvania – against the Ottoman Empire, and to switch the Ottoman vassalage to the Habsburgs.

The town and the castle survived relatively unharmed by the Counter-Reformation of Giorgio Basta, general of the Habsburg Empire. By 1618, ownership of the castle passed to the Bethlen family. Gabriel Bethlen Voivode of Transylvania consolidated and enlarged the castle, and gave it to his nephew Stephen Bethlen who lived here with his wife Mary Széchy, famed for her beauty.

The Reformed Church of Hungary was established in Hunedoara in 1634 and Imre Thököly, one of the leaders of the Protestant anti-Habsburg uprising and later Prince of Transylvania owned the castle and spent much time living in it. By 1685, the castle passed into the possession of Michael Apafi, the pro-Habsburg Prince of Transylvania. In 1710, the old church was returned to the Franciscans, and in 1725 it reacquired its monastic rank. By this time, the majority of population was Romanian.

Most of current Hunedoara was at that time a lush plain through which the Cerna river was meandering. The first blast furnace was built by 1603, followed by another four. The modern iron operations began at the foot of Saint Peter hill (Sanpetru), close to the most distant tower of the castle called Nebojša, (Serbian for "have no fear", a tower that was the furthest away from the castle in medieval times, to provide last refuge in the case of a siege; cf. Nebojša Tower). The mine shaft can still be viewed. Iron manufactures were also situated nearby.

In 1667, there was already a steel mill on the Cerna river producing 490 tons of pig iron and 66 tons of iron by 1699. In 1714 Georg Steinhilbert made a second one and a third was made in 1727. In 1743, the operations were handled directly by the Treasury. Of the mills mentioned, one was located under the main bridge and its walls are now in ruins.

The first tall industrial furnace in the world for iron extracting, it has been argued, was built in 1750 in Topliţa near Hunedoara, and a later one in Govăşdia in 1806. Both furnaces can be visited today. To reach it by road could only be through Teliucu Inferior (Alsótelek then) and Teliucu Superior (Felsőtelek then). Until 2001, there was a system of narrow-gauge railway built in the 19th and 20th centuries that ran from Hunedoara castle, near Zlaşti through a 747 and a 42 meter long tunnel through the mountain, and the breathtaking landscape of "Ţara Pădurenilor" (Woodlanders' country) before arriving to Govăjdia. It was dismantled and scrapped from Zlaşti to Govăjdia and Crăciuneasa by the last owner the Talc-Dolomită Zlaşti company. The last remaining 2.3 km (1.43 mi) long narrow-gauge rail system from the Hunedoara castle to Zlaşti was in use by the Talc-Dolomită Zlaşti company till 2007. In the summer of 2009 they have removed this last remaining section of this line. There are efforts now for restoring the train line for tourism purposes.

In the 18th and part of the 19th century, as the town of Hunedoara became more and more industrialized, peasants from regions nearby began to move to the city and the population increased. Only the German, Hungarian and Székelys of Transylvania were represented in the Diet (see Unio Trium Nationum). The Romanians who at the time formed about approx. 50% of the population felt exploited and revolted on several occasions. The peasants of Hunedoara county supported the Revolt of Horea, Cloşca and Crişan in 1784, when they unsuccessfully besieged the nearby fortress of Deva.

The castle in Hunedoara gave refuge to the local nobility, and it was its last function as military defense. Later representatives from the region were sent to the Romanian national assemblies held in Blaj during the 1848 Revolution where Romanians decided to demand equal rights and resist the attempt of Hungary of gaining independence from the Habsburg House. This started a small scale insurrection across Transylvania that was quickly quieted by the Hungarian army, except for the Apuseni Mountains, on the north of Hunedoara, where the tribune Avram Iancu struggled to keep the Hungarian forces away from controlling the gold mines. The subsequent failures of the later Austro-Hungarian monarchy to fulfill to the demands of the Romanians together with the Magyarization campaigns further exacerbated and alienated the Romanian population of Hunedoara.

During World War I the Romanians from Hunedoara county actively supported the Romanian Army and the Romanian National Assembly declared the Union of Transylvania with Romania in 1918. After the ending of the war Transylvania became part of Romania. The Romanian populations in and around the city quickly earned political rights and representation, and industrial development continued at an ever-increasing rate.

During World War II the steel works were part of the war effort for the Axis. The Romanian Army lost 700,000 soldiers on the Eastern Front and the Allies, an additional 400,000 soldiers fighting against the Axis.

After the Soviet occupation and the subsequent communist regime, industry was favored, and Hunedoara had for a time the biggest steel-producing plant in Romania and the Balkans. The city grew larger, and the factories extended so much that they equaled or exceeded the size of the city. The population also increased to over 87,000. The football team, Corvinul Hunedoara, was for a very long time one of the highest-rated football teams in Romania, rivaling Steaua or Dinamo. A large stadium was built along with other sports facilities such as covered swimming pools and a skating ring. Besides the Corvinul sports club, two other sport clubs were constructed, Constructorul and Siderurgistul, each offering different sport facilities. Other notable constructions included a theater house, several large cinemas, many schools and high-schools and an engineering faculty.

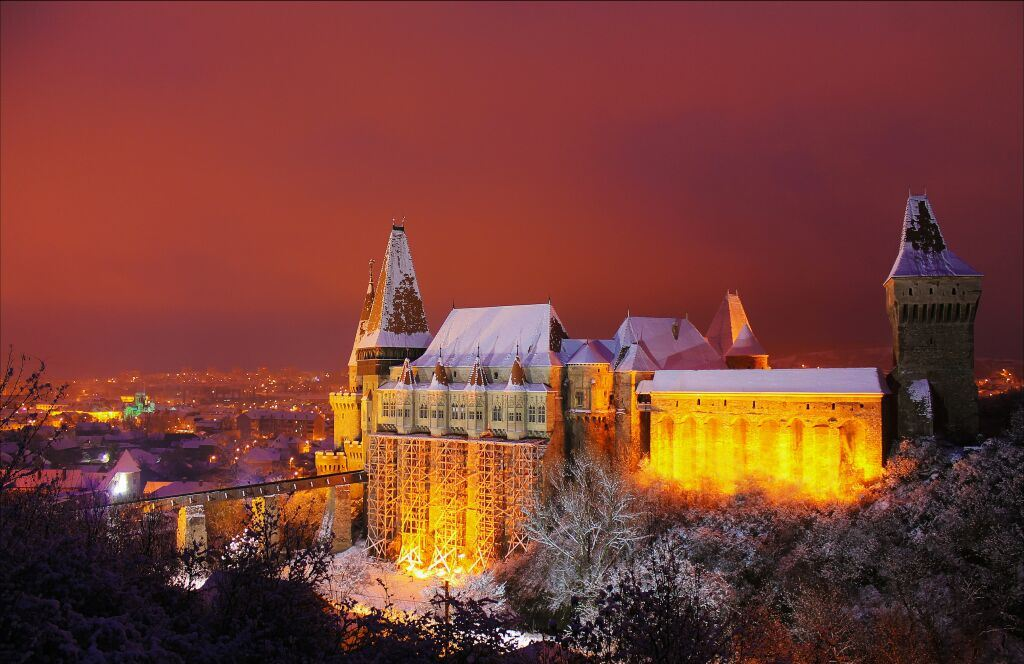
The castle in winter

The communist collapse meant that the old markets for steel vanished, and many enterprises had to be closed or abandoned. However, investment from Romanian and foreign capital ventures started offering new job opportunities for the people. Currently Arcelor-Mittal runs what is left of the steel works. The steel mill now operates the No. 2 Electric Steel Mill, Continuous Caster and the rolling mills. Production is scheduled to rise above 500,000 tons of steel in 2007 and beyond. The rest of the production facilities have been demolished or have been sold to private investors.

== Demographics ==
Historical population
Year	Pop.	±%
1850	1,937	—
1912	4,520	+133.4%
1930	4,600	+1.8%
1948	7,018	+52.6%
1956	36,498	+420.1%
1966	68,207	+86.9%
1977	79,719	+16.9%
1992	81,337	+2.0%
2002	71,380	−12.2%
2011	60,525	−15.2%
2021	50,457	−16.6%
Source: Census data

Before modern times, the ethnic balance of Hunedoara was more diverse, as was the case elsewhere in the region. During the rise of nationalism in the region the Romanians already had a solid majority and there was little of the ethnic friction that were to be found elsewhere in Transylvania (see Magyarization and Romanianization).

The 1850 census registered 1,937 residents, consisting of 1,275 Romanians, 248 Hungarians, 237 Germans, 101 Slovaks and 86 Roma. The religious denominations included 992 Orthodox, 370 Greek Catholics, 316 Roman Catholics, 181 Reformed, 42 Evangelic and 36 Jews. The 1900 census registered 4,419 residents, consisting of 1,987 Romanians, 1,896 Hungarians, 365 Germans, and 101 Slovaks.

The number of Hungarians dwindled after the Treaty of Trianon of 1920 when Transylvania became part of Romania, while the fall of Communism in December 1989 saw most German families leaving the town and the country to Germany.

During the Communist era, as the Steel Works were functioning the population peaked at 89,000, as workers moved in from the surrounding countryside as well as Oltenia and Moldavia. In the transition era that followed the fall of communism, a large percentage of the Romanian population lost their jobs and many left the town in search for better opportunities elsewhere. According to the latest census, from 2021, there were 50,457 people living within the city of Hunedoara. At the 2011 census, the city had a population 57,524, making it the 32nd largest city in Romania. The ethnic makeup was as follows:

- Romanians: 92.13%
- Hungarians: 5.19%
- Roma: 1.74%
- Others (mostly Transylvanian Saxons): 0.85%

== Natives ==
- Mihai Leu (born 1969), professional boxer
- Mihaela Miroiu (born 1955), political theorist and feminist philosopher
- Siegfried Mureșan (born 1981), economist and politician
- Marius Stan, (born 1957), football player and politician
- Iuliu Winkler (born 1964), engineer, economist, and politician
- Monica Raluca Sârghe Simes (born 1987), football player and coach

== Attractions ==
=== Hunyadi / Corvin Castle ===
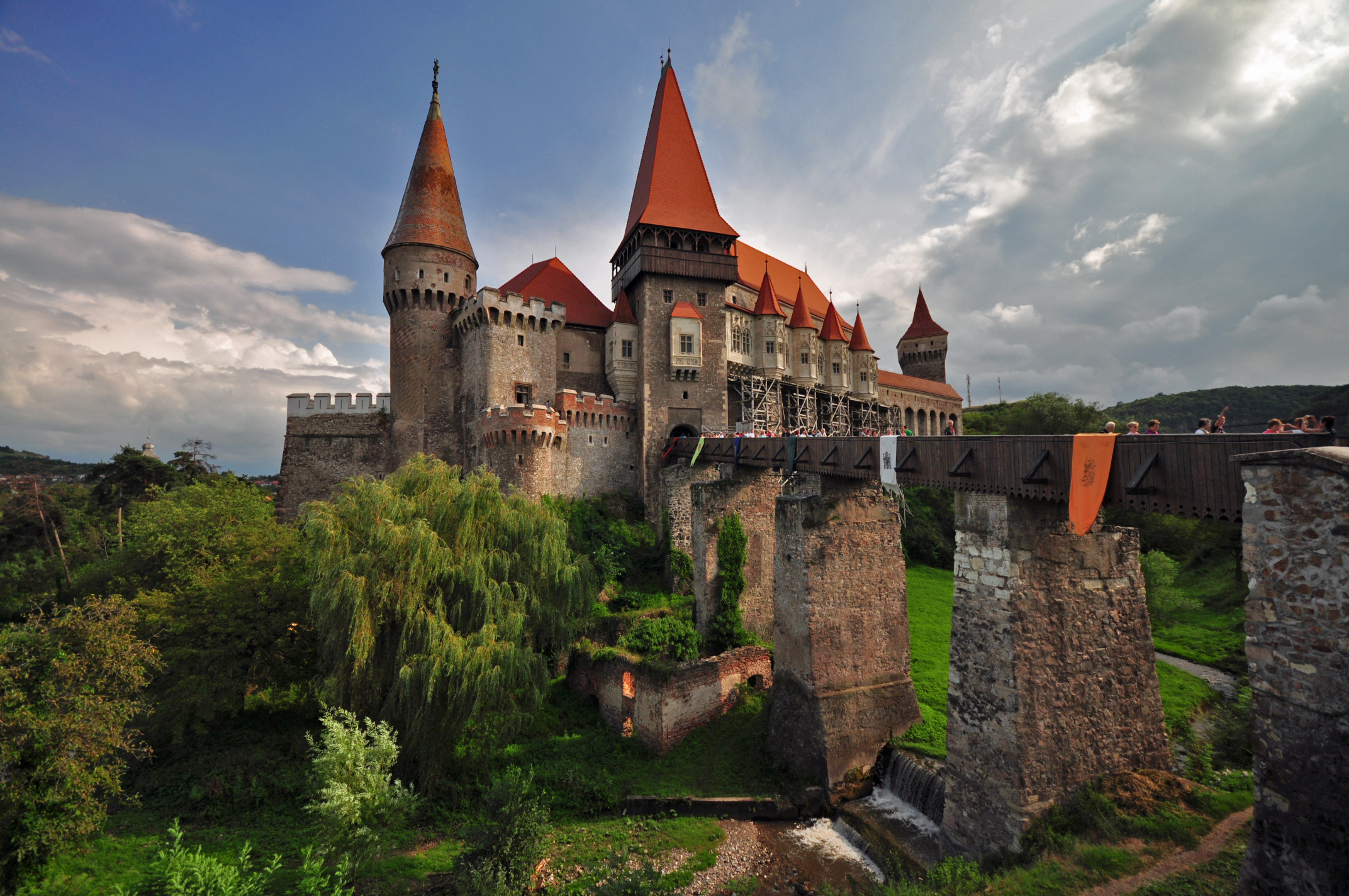
Hunyadi Castle

The Corvin Castle, also known as Hunyadi Castle or Hunedoara Castle (Romanian: Castelul Huniazilor or Castelul Corvinilor; Hungarian: Vajdahunyadi vár), is a Gothic-Renaissance castle in Hunedoara. It is one of the largest castles in Europe and is featured as one of the Seven Wonders of Romania. The Castle is known both by the name Corvin's Castle and Hunyadi or Hunedoara Castle. Hunyadi is the internationally more recognized name for the same family, Corvin being used mostly by Romanians.

The impressive size and architectural beauty sets it among the most impressive monuments of medieval art, with subsequent developments added Gothic and then Renaissance and Baroque. The building lies on a rock around which flows the Zlaști River. It has an impressive draw bridge, countless towers, a number of interior courts, and two large halls, "Knight Hall" and "Diet Hall", as it housed the Diet of Transylvania for a short period.

The castle history is mostly related to the Hunyadi family, being the place where John Hunyadi spent his childhood. Today the castle is being cared for by the municipality, as there are no recorded descendants of the Hunyadi that could pledge for it. Vlad Dracul, the ruler of Wallachia, the father of the notorious Vlad Dracula, was imprisoned here, as he had fallen into disgrace with Hunyadi, not providing the help promised (Dracula, who had once been traded as a hostage to the Ottomans by his own father, later became a protégé of Hunyadi, and took over Wallachia shortly before his mentor's death of fever). The castle and surroundings are often used by international film companies for the production of movies about medieval times.

- Old pictures of Hunyadi Castle

=== The Iron Museum ===
The Iron Museum closed in 2004.

=== Oak Forest of Chizid ===
Standing on a hill near Hunedoara, is a spot to get a view of the city.

=== Hunedoara Zoo ===
Located near the forest of Chizid, the zoo houses, among other animals, lions, bears, and wolves.

=== Sports ===
Hunedoara boasts one of Europe's most modern bowling alleys, that hosted the 2002 Bowling World Cup. Other sports facilities include red-clay tennis courts and an indoor swimming pool. Some of the notable athletes originating from Hunedoara include Mihai Leu, former WBO boxing world champion and national rally champion, Michael Klein (footballer), as well as Maria Cioncan, Olympic bronze-medallist and Bogdan Lobonț, prominent football goalkeeper.

Maria Neculita: Olympic bronze-medallist, 1992 Summer Olympic Games.
