= Ravna Gora =

Ravna Gora (Slavic meaning "flat hill") may refer to several places:

== Serbia ==
- Ravna Gora (highland), a highland in Serbia known for its relation with the Chetnik movement
- Ravna Gora (Ivanjica), a village near Ivanjica
- Ravna Gora (Vlasotince), a village near Vlasotince

== Croatia ==
- Ravna Gora, Croatia, a village in Gorski Kotar
- Ravna Gora (Slavonia), a mountain in Slavonia
- Ravna gora (Zagorje), a mountain in Zagorje

== Bulgaria ==
- Ravna Gora, Burgas Province, a village
- Ravna Gora, Varna Province, a village
- Ravna gora, Haskovo Province, a village

== See also ==
- Javorska Ravna Gora, a village near Ivanjica, Serbia
- Ravna (disambiguation)
