= Ravina =

Ravina or Rabina may refer to:

== People ==
=== Given name ===
- Two Jewish sages (amoraim) from the time of the gemara:
  - Ravina I (died 421)
  - Ravina II or Rabina II (fl. 5th century), nephew and successor of the above
- Ravina (actress), Indian actress
- Ravina Raj Kohli, Indian media executive
- Ravina Oa (born 1995), Papua New Guinean cricketer
- Rabina Khan (born 1972), Bangladeshi-born British writer and politician
- Raveena Aurora, Indian-American singer-songwriter
- Raveena Tandon, Indian actress

=== Surname ===
- Bernadette Ravina (born 1975), Mauritian javelin thrower
- Bruno Ravina (born 1984), Mauritian footballer
- Jean-Henri Ravina (1818–1906), French pianist, composer, and teacher
- Mark Ravina (born 1961), American scholar of Japanese history
- Oscar Ravina (1930–2010), Polish violinist, teacher, and concertmaster

== Places ==
- Rabina, Mostar, a village in Mostar, Herzegovina-Neretva Canton, Federation of Bosnia and Herzegovina, Bosnia and Herzegovina
- Rabina, Nevesinje, a village in Nevesinje, Republika Srpska, Bosnia and Herzegovina
- Ravina (Lordville, New York), a historic district listed on the U.S. National Register of Historic Places

== Other uses ==
- Ravina Project Toronto, a Canadian climate change research project
- Toronto Ravinas, Canadian Professional Hockey League team 1927–1928

== See also ==
- Mar son of Ravina (fl. 3rd century), Babylonian Jewish rabbi
- Raveena, an Indian feminine given name
- Ravine (disambiguation)
- Ravinia (disambiguation)
- Ravna (disambiguation)
