= Ravna =

Ravna may refer:

- Ravna, Jablanica, Bosnia and Herzegovina, a city
- Ravna (Maglaj), Bosnia and Herzegovina, a city
- Ravna, Montana Province, Bulgaria, a village
- Ravna, Sofia Province, Bulgaria, a village in Godech Municipality
- Ravna, Varna Province, Bulgaria, a village in Provadiya Municipality
- Ravna (Knjaževac), Serbia, a village
- Ravna, Kanal, Slovenia, a village

== See also ==
- Ravina (disambiguation)
- Ravna Gora (disambiguation)
- Ravna planina
