= Măgura Uroiului =

Archaeological site in Romania

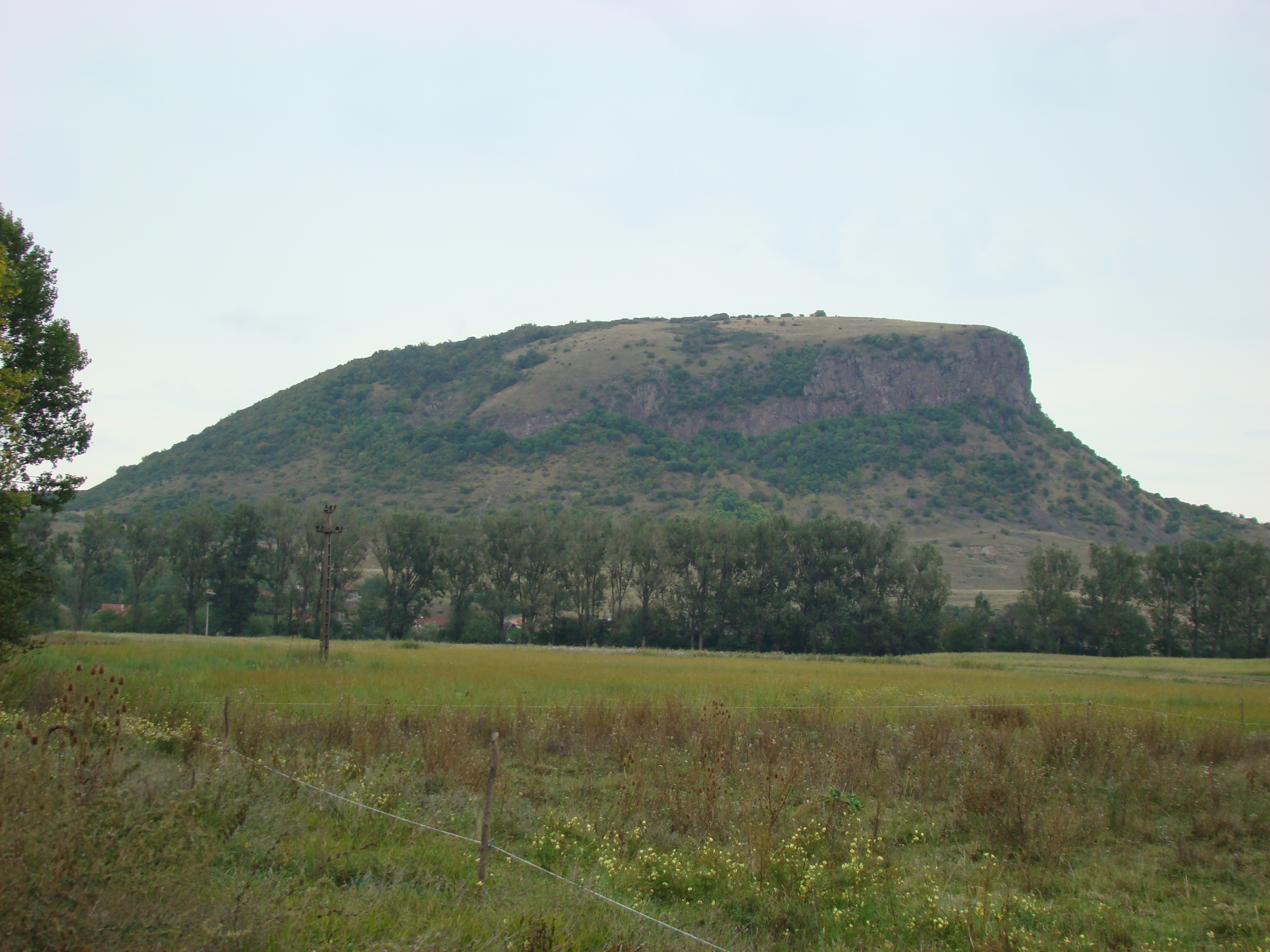
Măgura Uroiului din Uroi

The Măgura Uroiului (Uroi Hill) site is a Romanian multi-period archaeological site located on and around Uroi Hill, a 300 metres (984 ft) tall rock outcrop, with an escarpment facing the rivers Mureș and Strei and sloping on the back side. At the base on the escarpment are a series of plateaus. The site is located about 2 kilometres (1 mi) north of Simeria. 45°51′40″N 23°2′37″E

== History and geography ==
Excavations and fieldwalks have discovered Bronze Age, Hallstatt and La Tene (Dacian) settlements and earthwork fortifications, as well as a Roman villa and evidence of a Roman quarrying settlement. Minor attention has also been paid to the World War II anti-aircraft entrenchments and training trenches. The La Tene settlement is located on plateaus at the base of the escarpment, as are the World War II military trenches. The Roman villa is located to the side of the hill. The Bronze and Iron Age earthwork fortifications are located on the slope on the back of the hill. There is also a Bronze Age and Neolithic settlement on top of the hill which has not yet been excavated.

== Excavations ==
This archaeological site was first discovered in 1921 by I. Marțian but remained unexcavated until 2001. The current excavation project was started in 2001 by Angelica Balos following a preventive excavation contracted by the national telephone company Romtelecom. From 2003 until 2006 Balos has directed the systematic research excavations at this site. These excavations are carried out as part of the Măgura Uroiului Project, directed by Balos and the Museum of Dacian and Roman Civilisation in Deva, in partnership with Universitatea "Valahia" in Târgovişte, the Anthropological Research Centre, Bucharest, Asociația Studenților în Arheologie (Association of Archaeology Students) and the Department of Civil Protection.

== Significant discoveries ==
The Iron Age graves at this site have provided new insights into the health of people in the region during the Iron Age. From the anthropological studies of the skeletons it is understood what diseases these people had and what was common age of death in their population.

Dacian scale armour found at this site was the first of its typology. This type of scale armour is between lamellar and hanging scales. Previously, this type of armour had not been found at Dacian sites.
