= Hunedoara County Prefecture =

Building in Deva, Romania

Coordinates: 45°53′19″N 22°53′50″E

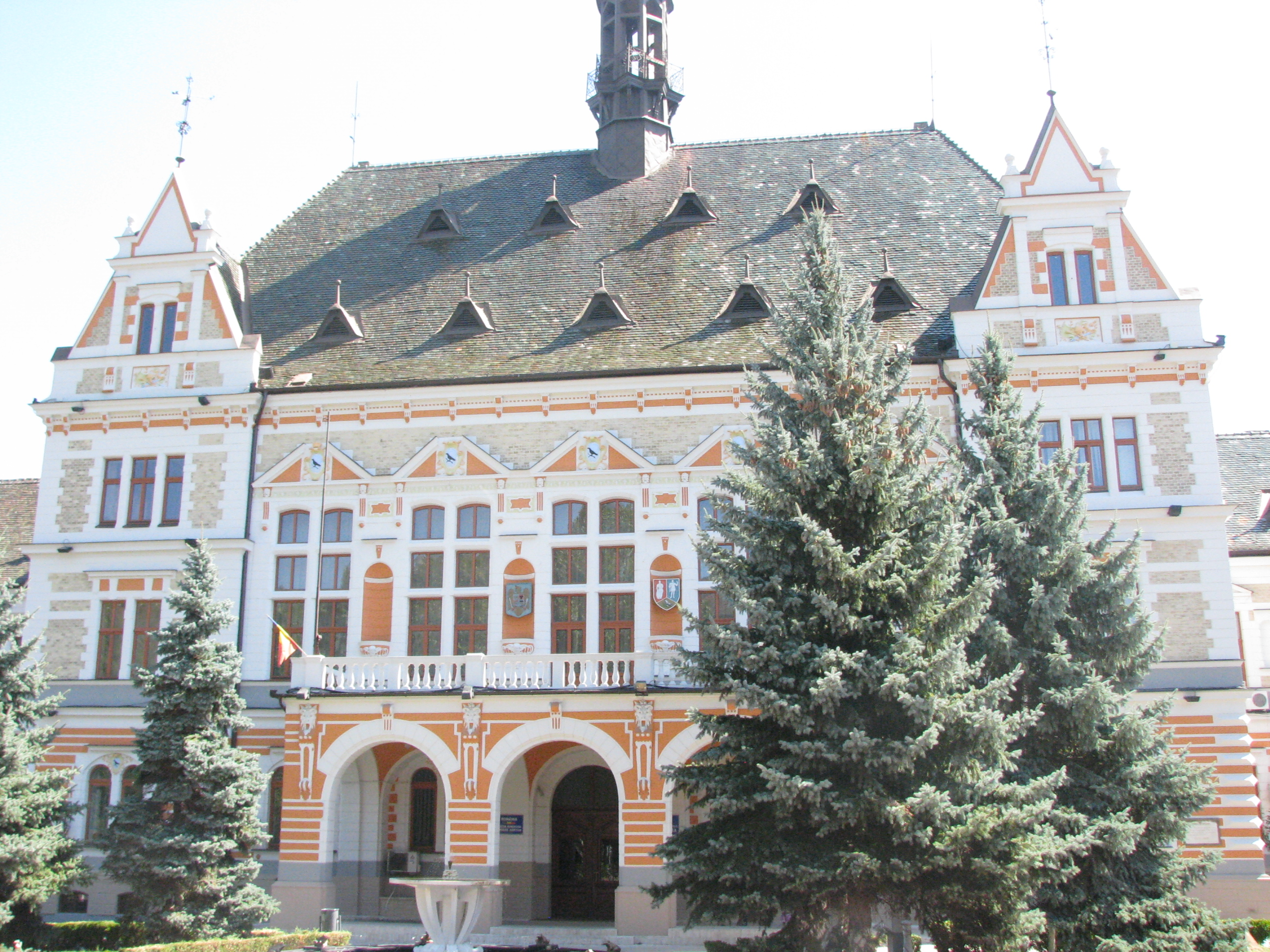
Hunedoara County Prefecture

The Hunedoara County Prefecture (Romanian: Palatul Administrativ din Deva, Hungarian: Dévai vármegyeház) is a building in Deva, Romania. Built in 1889–1890 in a late eclectic style after the plans of architect Ignác Alpár, it houses both the prefect's office of Hunedoara County and the county council.

== History ==
Permission for building the county home was granted in July 1885, along with a subsidy of 5000 Hungarian forints. The following spring, the council declared a competition for the completion of the construction plan. Among 14 entries Alpár Ignác was chosen. Construction took place between 1889 and 1890.

The building was considered a prefecture until 1920. Since then it has been used by different state institutions, and during Communist rule was the county seat. For a short time after 1989 it housed the town hall of Deva, and then became the seat of the prefecture of Hunedoara county. Since 2007 it has housed the County Council. A renovation began in 2007.

== Description ==
The building is V-shaped and located in front of the fortress of Deva and the city park. The building is symmetric. At one point servants' quarters and official offices were housed on the first floor.

Upstairs a metersmeeting room is decorated in Neo-Renaissance and Baroque style. The nine-meter-high room is covered with a coffered ceiling and a wrought iron chandelier. The room is full of Neorenaissance decorations. The gallery and the door frames are decorated with the Hunyadi crest, featuring a raven. From the balcony a view of the fortress and the square can be seen. On the balcony are some empty statue recesses.

The roof is covered with green Zsolnay tiles. A high tower is the middle. An indoor garden is behind the building.
