= Meșterul Manole =

Chief Architect of Curtea de Argeș Monastery

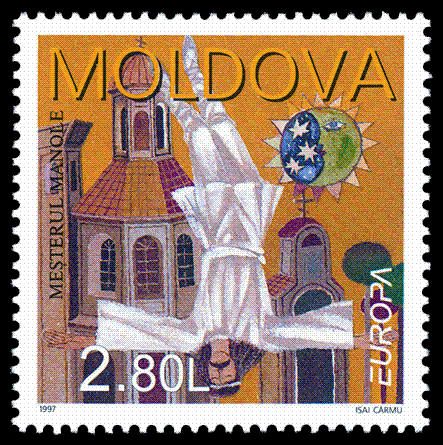
Meşterul Manole

In Romanian mythology, Meșterul Manole (roughly: The master builder Manole) was the chief architect of the Curtea de Argeș Monastery in Wallachia. The myth of the cathedral's construction is expressed in the folk poem Monastirea Argeșului ("The Monastery on the Argeș River").

In the poem, Manole finds it impossible to build the monastery without a human sacrifice and, despite his efforts, is forced to sacrifice his own pregnant wife, Ana, by encasing her in the walls of the building. Written in the style of a folk ballad, the poem is often seen as an example of an "aesthetic myth" in folkloric literature, having at its core the belief that nothing durable and unique can be built without the creator's self-sacrifice.

George Călinescu considered Meșterul Manole, along with Miorița, Zburătorul and Dochia and Trajan, as being part of the four fundamental myths of Romanian folk literature.

== Plot ==
The Legend of Master Manole: Prince Radu the Black (Radu Negru) wanted to build the most beautiful monastery in the country, so he hired Master Manole, the best mason of those times, along with his 9 men. During construction, because the walls of the monastery would continuously crumble, the Prince threatened to kill Manole and his workers.

Desperate about the way construction went, one night Manole had a dream in which he was told that, for the monastery to be built, he had to incorporate into its walls some person very loved by him or his masons. He told his masons about his dream, and they agreed that the first wife who would come there with lunch for her husband the following day should be the one to be built into the walls of the monastery so that their art would last.

The next day, Manole looked over the hills and sadly saw his wife, Ana (who was pregnant), coming from afar. He prayed to God to start rain and storm in order for her to stop her trip or go back home. But her love was stronger than the storm, and she kept going. He prayed again, but nothing could stop her. When she arrived, Manole and the builders told her that they wanted to play a little game, which involved building walls around her body. She accepted happily, but she soon realized that this was no game and implored Manole to let her go. But he had to keep his promise. And that was how the beautiful monastery was built.

When the monastery was completed, the Prince asked the builders if they could ever make a similarly splendid building. Manole and his masons told the Prince that they surely could always build an even greater building. Hearing that and fearing they'll build a bigger and more beautiful building for someone else, the Prince had them all stranded on the roof so that they would perish and never build something to match it. They fashioned wooden wings and tried to fly off the roof. But, one by one, they all fell to the ground. A well of clear water, named after Manole, is believed to mark the spot where Manole himself fell.

=== Negru Vodă ===
Negru Vodă from the tale appears to be a fusion between Radu Negru, the traditional founder of Ţara Românească (Wallachia), and Neagoe Basarab, the historical builder of the church.

== Publication and legacy ==
Alongside "Miorița", "Toma Alimoș" and "Dolca", it was published by Vasile Alecsandri in the first collection of Romanian folk creations in 1852, entitled "Poezii populare, balade (Cântice bătrânești) adunate și îndreptate de Vasile Alecsandri". Although the popular text has several variants, because the author is anonymous and the ballad was transmitted orally from generation to generation, the one published by Alecsandri is consecrated in literary form.

Many Romanian writers had the legend as a motif and source of inspiration. Among them, Lucian Blaga (in his Meşterul Manole theatre play) brought forth a modern take on the myth. In Blaga's version, Manole's self-sacrifice is not prompted by any gesture of Prince Radu, but it is instead a personal journey.

== Analysis ==
The role of Ana, in particular was widely discussed by scholars, often as an example of a model wife, who never wavers from commitment and duty to Manole even in the face of supernatural efforts to stop her, but also as a feminist critique of marriage, which requires women to sacrifice themselves and become confined within the walls of the house for the sake of their husbands' work.

The attempt by Manole and the other masons to flee the roof by building wooden wings only appears in the Romanian version and is a variation of the Icarus myth.

== Similarities ==
A similar tale in the Hungarian culture is Kőműves Kelemen ("Kelemen, the Bricklayer"), whose synopsis is essentially equivalent to the story of Manole. Another story is that of Rozafa, the castle in Shkodra, Albania. Rozafa was the wife of the youngest of three brothers that could only built the castle after they had to wall her alive. In Serbia, The Building of Skadar also uses the "bricked-in wife" trope.

Another similar story is the legend of the Matsue Castle in Japan. By some estimated, there are over 700 local variants of the myth.
