= Chiprovtsi Municipality =

Chiprovtsi Municipality Община Чипровци
- Municipality
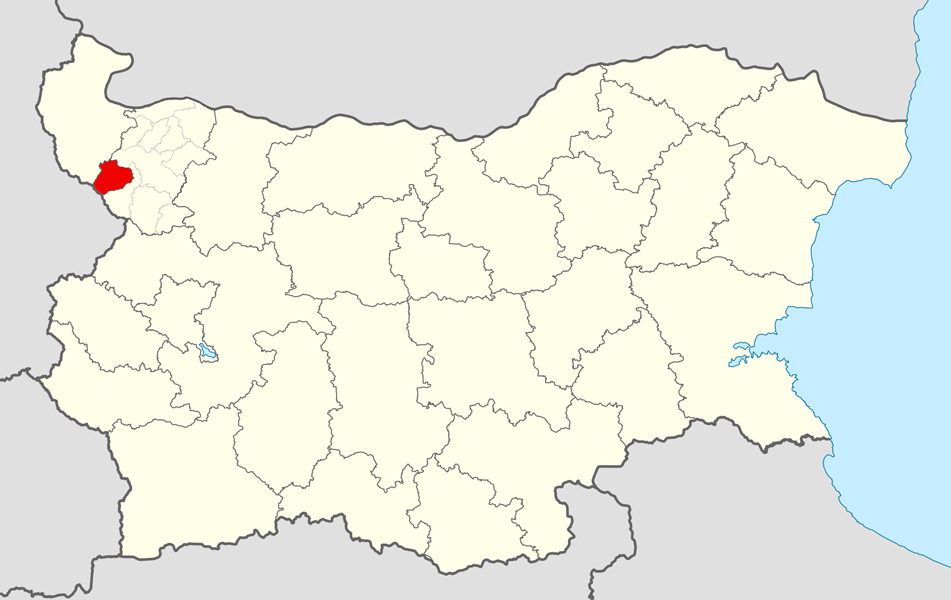
- Chiprovtsi Municipality within Bulgaria and Montana Province.
- Coordinates: 43°23′N 22°50′E
- Country: Bulgaria
- Province (Oblast): Montana
- Admin. centre (Obshtinski tsentar): Chiprovtsi

Area
  - Total: 286.8 km^{2} (110.7 sq mi)

Population (Census February 2011)
  - Total: 3,657
  - Density: 12.75/km^{2} (33.03/sq mi)
- Time zone: UTC+2 (EET)
  - Summer (DST): UTC+3 (EEST)

Chiprovtsi Municipality (Bulgarian: Община Чипровци) is a small frontier municipality (obshtina) in Montana Province, Northwestern Bulgaria, located on the northern slopes of western Stara Planina mountain and the area of the so-called Fore-Balkan. It is named after its administrative centre - the town of Chiprovtsi. In the southwest, the municipality borders on Republic of Serbia.

The area embraces a territory of 286.8 km^{2} with a population of 3,657 inhabitants, as of February 2011.

== Settlements ==
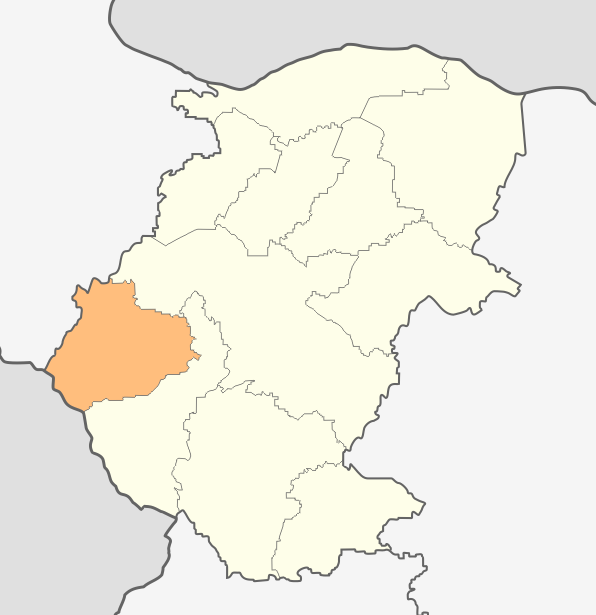
Chiprovtsi Municipality within Montana Province

Chiprovtsi Municipality includes the following 10 places (towns are shown in bold):

Town/Village	Cyrillic	Population (December 2009)
**Chiprovtsi**	**Чипровци**	1,871
Belimel	Белимел	252
Chelyustnitsa	Челюстница	81
Gorna Kovachitsa	Горна Ковачица	118
Gorna Luka	Горна Лука	185
Martinovo	Мартиново	312
Mitrovtsi	Митровци	115
Prevala	Превала	411
Ravna	Равна	47
Zhelezna	Железна	327
Total		3,719

== Geography ==
Chiprovtsi Municipality is located in the western part of Montana Province. The municipality has an area of 286.9 square kilometres (110.8 sq mi), which is 7.89% of the provinces' territory and 0.26% of that of Bulgaria. To the east, Chiprovtsi municipality borders Montana and Georgi Damyanovo municipalities of the same province; its southern neighbour is also Georgi Damyanovo. To the west are the Serbian border and Chuprene municipality of Vidin Province and to the north is Ruzhintsi municipality of Vidin Province. Besides the town, the municipality includes nine villages, namely Belimel, Chelyustnitsa, Gorna Kovachitsa, Gorna Luka, Martinovo, Mitrovtsi, Prevala, Ravna and Zhelezna. The town lies 155 km (96 mi) from the Bulgarian capital Sofia, 35 km (22 mi) from the provincial capital Montana, 44 km (27 mi) from Berkovitsa and 18 km (11 mi) from the national border of Bulgaria and Serbia; the nearest Serbian municipality is Surdulica.

Chiprovtsi municipality falls in the humid continental climate climate zone, with a slight mountain influence. The average year-round temperature is 9.7 °C (49.5 °F); the average monthly temperature is −1 to 0 °C (30 to 32 °F) in January and 20 °C (68 °F) in July. The average yearly precipitation is 776–816 millimetres. The spring is short and rainy, while the summer is generally hot and dry. In the winter, the area is subject to a strong northeastern wind and a temperature inversion in the valleys.

Of the 38 rivers and rivulets that flow across the municipality, the most important are the Ogosta and the Prevalska. There is a water reservoir near Martinovo and a hydroelectric plant at Zhelezna. There are no mineral springs in the municipality. Chiprovtsi municipality is home to 1,250 species of plants, including a large number of herbs and deciduous trees; some of the trees are 150–300 years old.

Of the municipality's area of 286.9 km^{2} (110.8 sq mi), 50.51% or 144.9 km^{2} (55.9 sq mi) are covered by forests, 42.73% or 122.6 km^{2} (47.3 sq mi) constitute arable land and 5.71% or 16.4 km^{2} (6.3 sq mi) are urban areas. The remaining 1.05% are composed of water areas, mines and infrastructure.

== Demographics ==
On 31 July 2005, Chiprovtsi municipality's population was 4,810; 2,375 people were from the town itself—1,167 men and 1,208 women. By June 2008, the town's population had declined to 2,122. According to 2005 data, the largest village in the municipality is Prevala with a population of 585; the smallest is Ravna with 68. The ethnic composition of the municipality is homogeneous; 4,722 people or 99.21% identify themselves as Bulgarians and 38 people or 0.79% as Roma. Of the Roma, three quarters live in the Barzan neighbourhood of Martinovo and arrived from around Asenovgrad, the rest are residents of Chelyustnitsa and descend from Berkovitsa.

Since 1956, the municipality has experienced population ageing and rural depopulation, as many people have migrated to larger cities such as Montana, Vidin, Vratsa and Sofia. The ratio of urban to rural population is 49.37% to 50.63%, indicating an almost equal distribution between the town of Chiprovtsi and the surrounding villages. As of 2005, the unemployment in the municipality is 23.5%, much higher than the Bulgarian average of 7.75% according to 2007 data.

Population structure and dynamics of Chiprovtsi municipality 1934–2004
Place	1934	1946	1956	1965	1976	1985	1992	1999	2000	2001	2002	2004	2017
Belimel	1470	1432	1560	1347	867	657	532	406	380	372	339	206	215
Chelyustnitsa	626	587	483	393	279	200	151	132	129	115	105	98	70
**Chiprovtsi**	2,831	3,135	3,517	4,134	3,399	3,236	3,089	2,666	2,585	2,391	2,487	2,375	1,594
Gorna Kovachitsa	791	736	607	545	461	322	257	181	186	190	170	160	123
Gorna Luka	1,022	992	903	776	579	464	388	306	293	280	274	251	174
Martinovo	854	890	882	1,330	1,058	710	613	458	440	417	433	410	226
Mitrovtsi	971	965	800	580	989	312	241	191	178	162	160	143	151
Prevala	1,599	1,719	1,529	1,391	1,201	1,042	911	759	713	594	635	565	369
Ravna	348	360	276	211	153	112	106	83	83	75	75	68	n/a
Zhelezna	912	973	925	1,056	762	623	560	481	461	434	434	414	263
Total	11,424	11,779	11,482	11,762	9,148	7,678	6,817	5,663	5,448	5,030	5,116	4,810	3,219

Since 2004 the population of the municipality has declined: 2005 = 4,198, 2007 = 3,955, 2009 = 3,719, 2011 = 3,657 The population declined further to 3,219 people at the end of 2017.

=== Religion ===
According to the latest Bulgarian census of 2011, the religious composition, among those who answered the optional question on religious identification, was the following:

Religious composition of Chiprovtsi Municipality
Orthodox Christianity	84.7%
Catholicism	0.6%
Protestantism	0.1%
Islam	0.0%
No religion	2.2%
Prefer not to answer, others and indefinable	12.4%

== Governance ==
The municipal government consists of a mayor (kmet), a deputy mayor and a secretary. Since 2007, the municipality has been governed by Zaharin Ivanov Zamfirov of Bulgarian Agrarian People's Union "Aleksandar Stamboliyski" who won the municipal elections with 1,615 votes or 62.67% against Antoaneta Todorova Kostova of the Bulgarian Socialist Party who amassed 962 votes or 37.33%. Two villages in the municipality are eligible to elect their own mayor, Prevala and Zhelezna.

The municipal administration is divided into two branches, the common and specialized administration. The common administration is further divided into the "Information Services" and "Financial-economical Activities and Handling of Property" departments; the specialized administration includes the "Planning and Distribution of the Budget" and "Territorial and Village Planning and Building" departments. The municipality has no separate court or prosecutor's office and is instead serviced by the Montana provincial court and office. The local police station is subordinate to the one in Montana. There is a Municipal Land Commission, part of the Ministry of Agriculture and Forestry, and a Municipal Social Service. The Municipal Land Commission takes care of land and forest distribution and the Municipal Social Service oversees financial aid and supports the disabled.

== See also ==
- Provinces of Bulgaria
- Municipalities of Bulgaria
- List of cities and towns in Bulgaria
