= Belimel =

Village in northwestern Bulgaria

Coordinates: 43°26′N 22°58′E

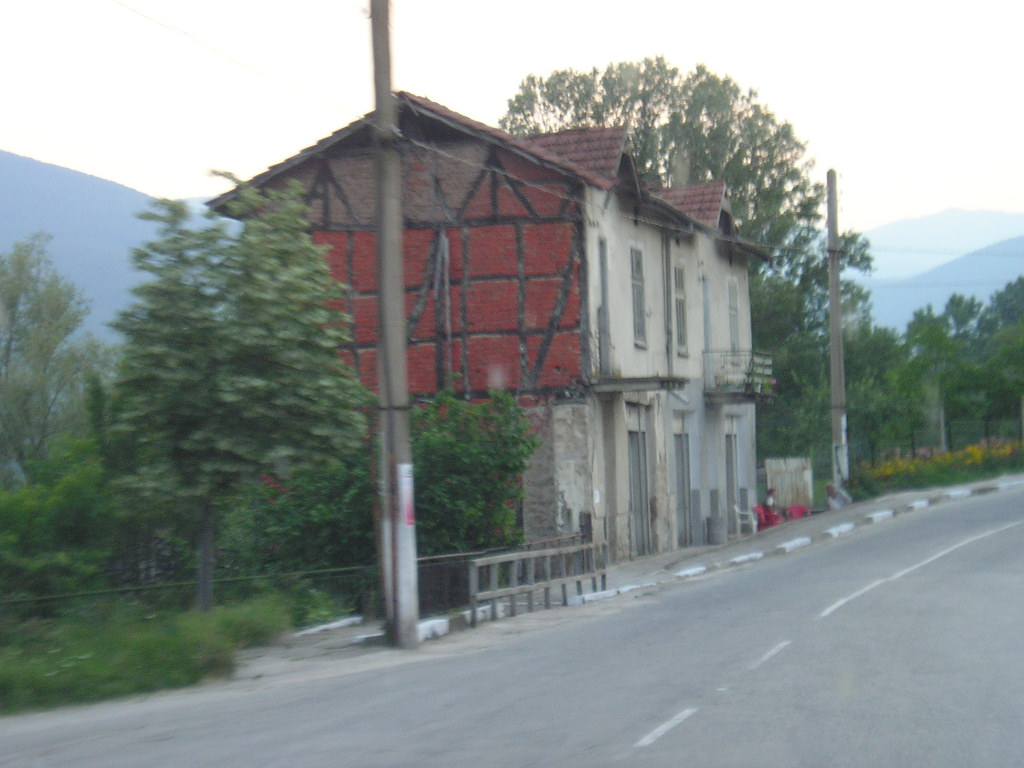
House on the main street

Belimel (Bulgarian: Белимел) is a village in northwestern Bulgaria, part of Chiprovtsi Municipality, Montana Province.

Belimel Bay in Trinity Island, Antarctica is named after Belimel.
