= Gorna Luka =

Village in Bulgaria

Coordinates: 43°27′N 22°54′E

Gorna Luka (Bulgarian: Горна Лука) is a village in northwestern Bulgaria, part of Chiprovtsi Municipality, Montana Province.
