= Coat of arms of Deva, Romania =

Coat of arms of Deva
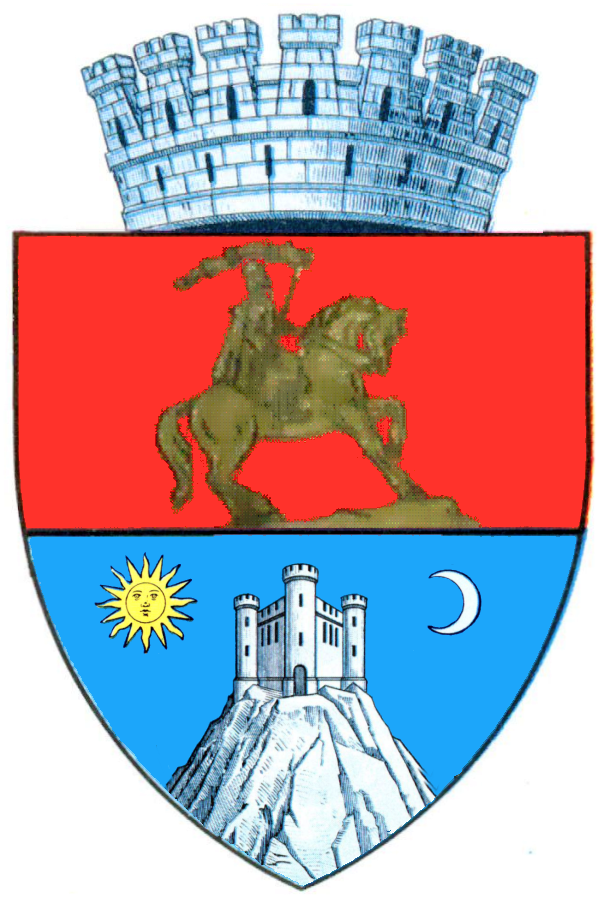
- Armiger: The Local Council of Deva (Consiliul local)
- Adopted: 1999
- Crest: A seven tower mural crown
- Shield: Party per fess; the chief Gules, a rider mounted (vested in ancient costume) and sustaining a Dacian ensign (a snake with wolf head) all Or; the base Azure, a fortress on a hill Argent, accompanied on the dexter by a sun Or formed from a central point with rays, on the sinister by an increscent moon Argent
- Supporters: None
- Motto: None
- Use: On the City hall's and Local Council's documents

The coat of arms of Deva has been since 1999 the coat of arms used by the City Government of Deva, Romania (the Local Council of Deva, the Mayor of Deva). The arms of Deva, comprising the shield and the coronet (the mural crown), was modelled on the arms in use during the interwar period.

== Description and symbolism ==
=== Blazon ===
The heraldic blazon of Deva's coat of arms is:

Party per fess. The chief gules, a rider mounted, vested in ancient costume, and sustaining a Dacian ensign, a snake with wolf head, all or. The base azure, a fortress on a hill argent, accompanied on the dexter by a sun or formed from a central point with rays, on the sinister by an increscent moon argent.

The coronet is a mural crown argent, with seven towers.

=== Symbolism ===
Shield
The Rider vested in ancient costume and sustaining a Dacian ensign stands for "The King Decebal", and "advanced Dacian Civilisation".
The Castle represents "The Medieval Fortress" that guarded the town along years.
The Sun and The Increscent Moon stands for turbulent life of the city

Coronet
The Mural Crown stands for the place of the city in today's administrative hierarchy as a capital county city.

== History ==
The first blazon of the city of Deva dates from 1618. A description remains only:

The today Coat of Arms of Deva was sanctioned by The 39th Local Council Act from 17 May, 1994 (Romanian: Hotărârea Consiliului local nr. 39/1994). Later, this act was approved by the 790th Romanian Government Act from 27 September 1999 (Hotărârea Guvernului nr. 790/27 septembrie 1999) and became legal on 12 October 1999, when the government act was published in The Official Bulletin of Romania (Monitorul Oficial al României, Partea I, nr. 490/12 octombrie 1999). The description of the coat of arms of Deva became part of the City's Statute (statutul municipiului Deva) that was sanctioned by The 197th Local Council Act from 29 May 2003.

== Gallery ==
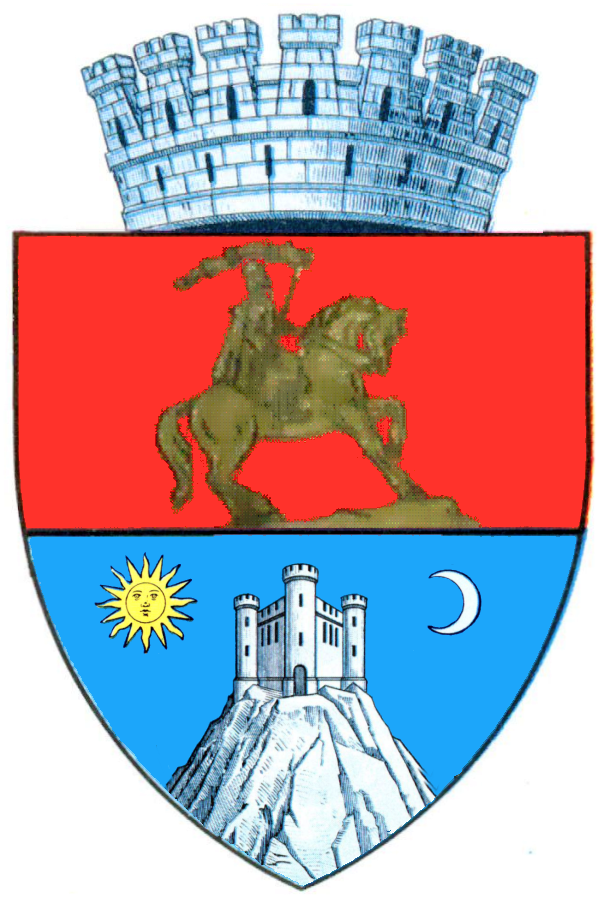
Present coat of arms of Deva

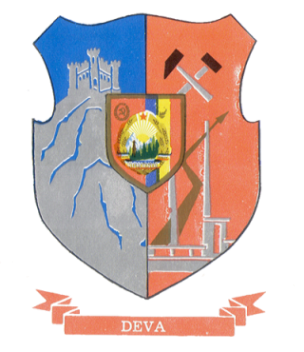
Coat of arms during Communist Romania

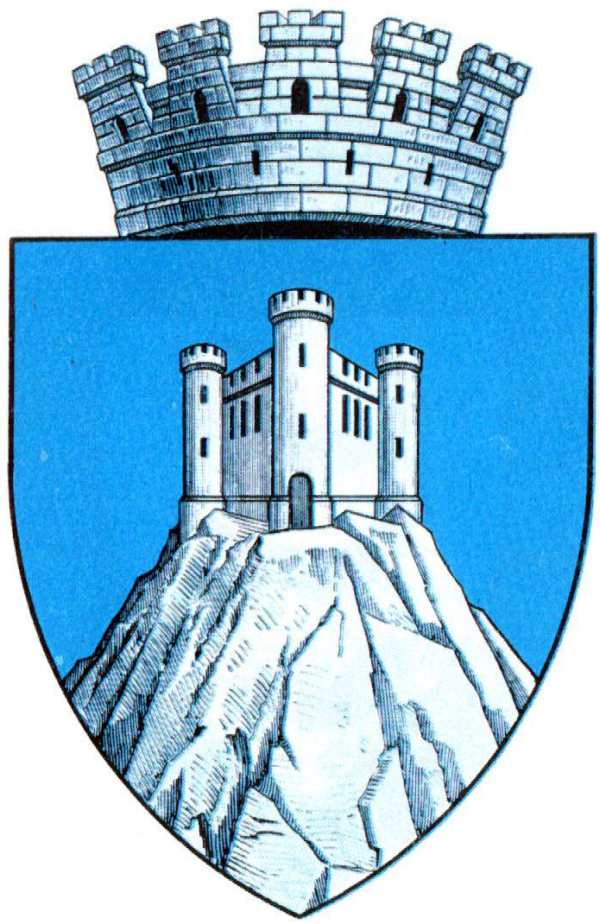
Interwar coat of arms of Deva
