= Prevala =

Prevala Превала
- Village
- Location within Bulgaria
- Coordinates: 43°28′00″N 22°52′00″E
- Country: Bulgaria
- Province: Montana Province
- Municipality: Chiprovtsi

Prevala (Bulgarian: Превала) is a village in northwestern Bulgaria, part of Chiprovtsi Municipality, Montana Province.

== History ==
It is believed that Prevala was one of many villages established northwest of Bulgaria due to the persecutions of Bulgarians during the Ottoman Empire.

== Population ==
The current population as of 31.12.2018 is estimated to be 372.
