= Chelyustnitsa =

Village in northwestern Bulgaria

Chelyustnitsa Челюстница
- Village
- Location within Bulgaria
- Coordinates: 43°26′N 23°00′E
- Country: Bulgaria
- Oblast: Montana
- Opština: Chiprovtsi

Government
  - Mayor (Municipality): Plamen Petkov (GERB)

Area
  - Total: 10.693 km^{2} (4.129 sq mi)
- Elevation: 345 m (1,132 ft)

Population (2024)
  - Total: 79
  - Density: 7.4/km^{2} (19/sq mi)
- Postal code: 3465
- Area code: 09552
- Vehicle registration: M

Chelyustnitsa (Bulgarian: Челюстница) is a village in northwestern Bulgaria, part of Chiprovtsi Municipality, Montana Province.
