= Museum of Dacian and Roman Civilisation =

Archaeological museum in Deva, Romania

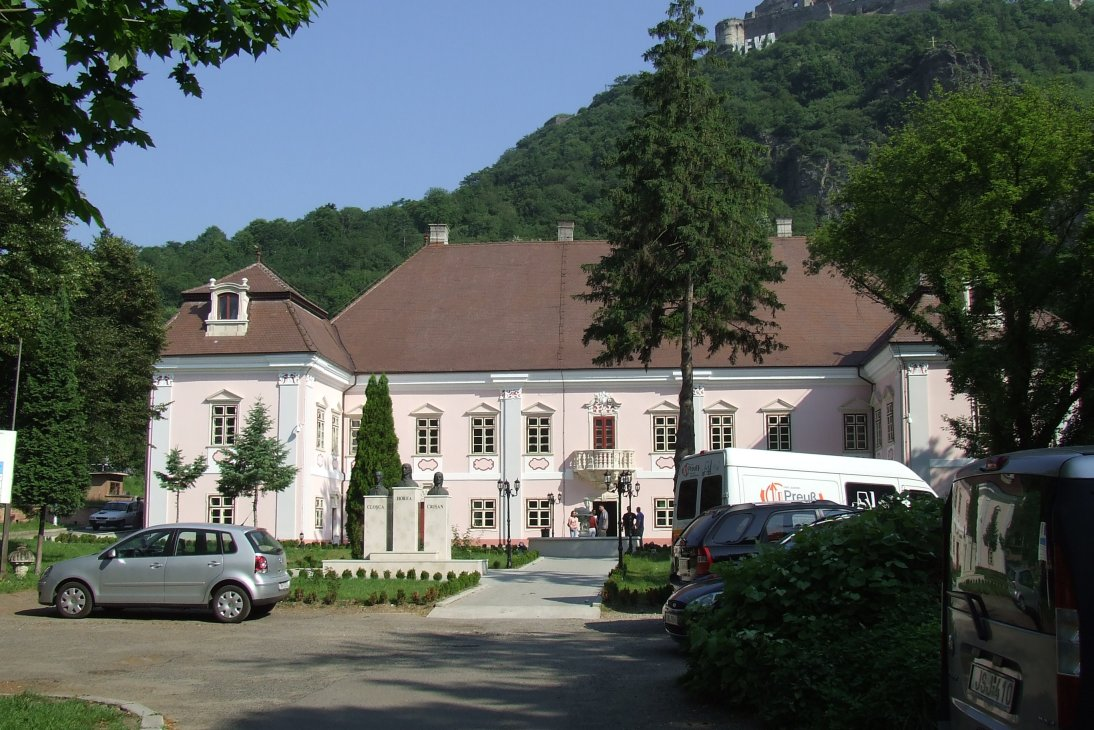
- Established: 1882
- Location: Deva, Romania
- Coordinates: 45.885884°N 22.898308°E
- Type: Local archaeological artifacts
- Website: mcdr.ro

The Museum of Dacian and Roman Civilisation is a museum in Deva, Romania. A brief history of Deva and its other neighbouring citadels as well as extensive archaeological discoveries from the numerous sights in and around the Orăştie Mountains are exhibited in the museum.

The museum was founded in 1882 as the County Museum and houses one of the most important archaeological collections in Transylvania, including numismatic, ethnographic and natural science exhibits. The museum is housed in the 17th century Magna Curia Palace, constructed in 1621 under the authority of Prince (Voivode) Gabor Bethlen. Under Bethlen's rule, Deva was the capital of Transylvania, for a brief period. The palace is located at the foot of the citadel hill next to a small park.

In a separate building next to the palace is the Natural History Museum (Muzeul Stintale Naturii). The Art Gallery branch of the museum (Sectia de Arta) is located in the opposite prefecture, on the other side of the park and on the corner of Str. 1 Decembrie and Str. Avram Iancu.

== Museum address ==
Dacian and Roman Civilization Museum
B-dul 1 Decembrie 1918 nr. 39
Deva
jud. Hunedoara
2700
Romania
