= Gorna Kovachitsa =

Village in Bulgaria

Coordinates: 43°25′N 23°00′E

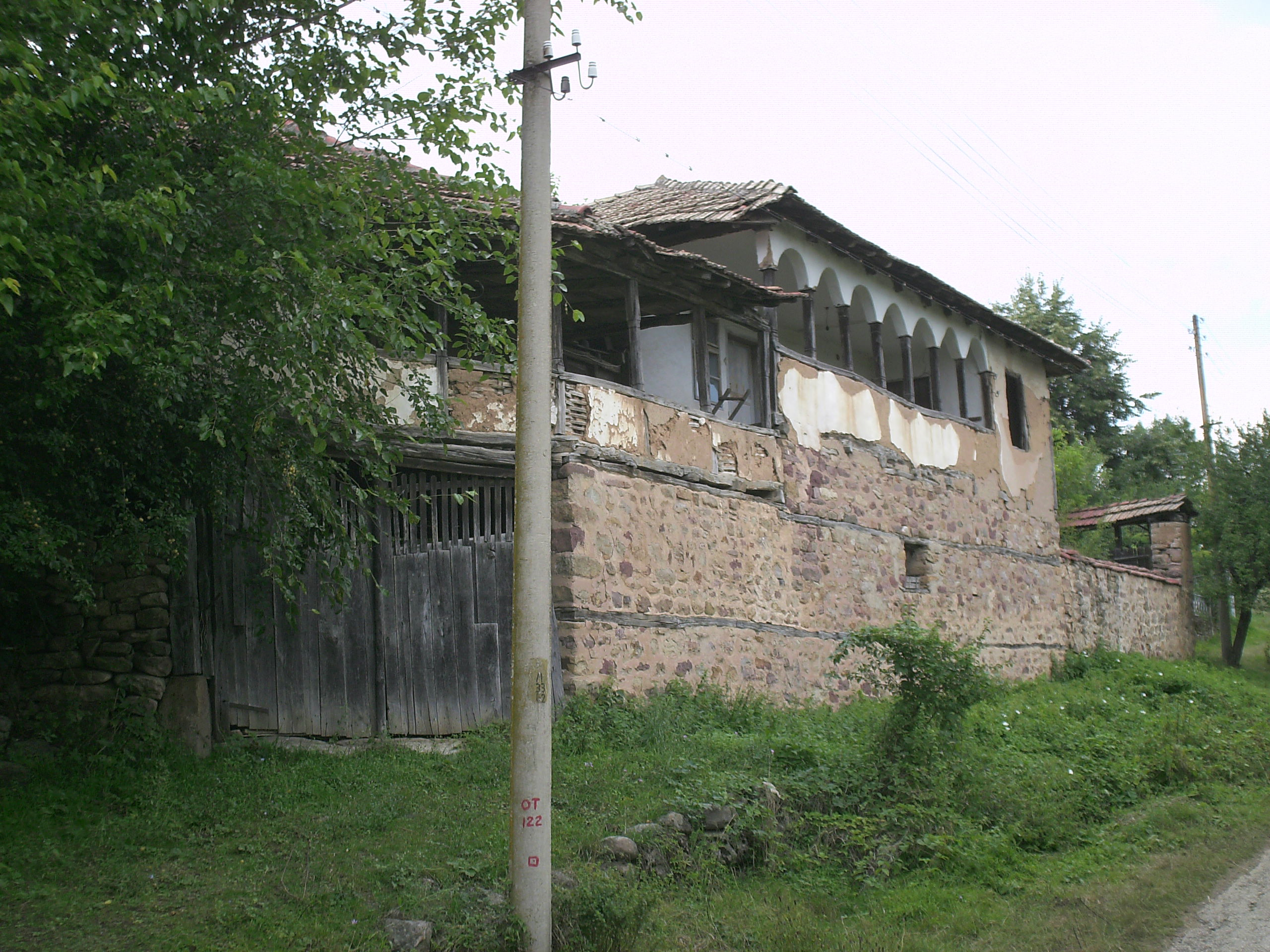
Diman's House

Gorna Kovachitsa (Bulgarian: Горна Ковачица) is a village in northwestern Bulgaria, part of Chiprovtsi Municipality, Montana Province.
