= Mitrovtsi =

Village in Bulgaria

Coordinates: 43°26′N 22°56′E

Mitrovtsi (Bulgarian: Митровци) is a village in northwestern Bulgaria, part of Chiprovtsi Municipality, Montana Province.

It is next to the main road Sofia–Belogradchik–Vidin, between the villages of Beli Mel and Gorna Luka.

== Notable people ==
- Marusya Ivanova Lyubcheva (born 1949), Bulgarian politician
