= Martinovo =

Village in Bulgaria

Coordinates: 43°24′N 22°50′E

Martinovo Мартиново
- Village
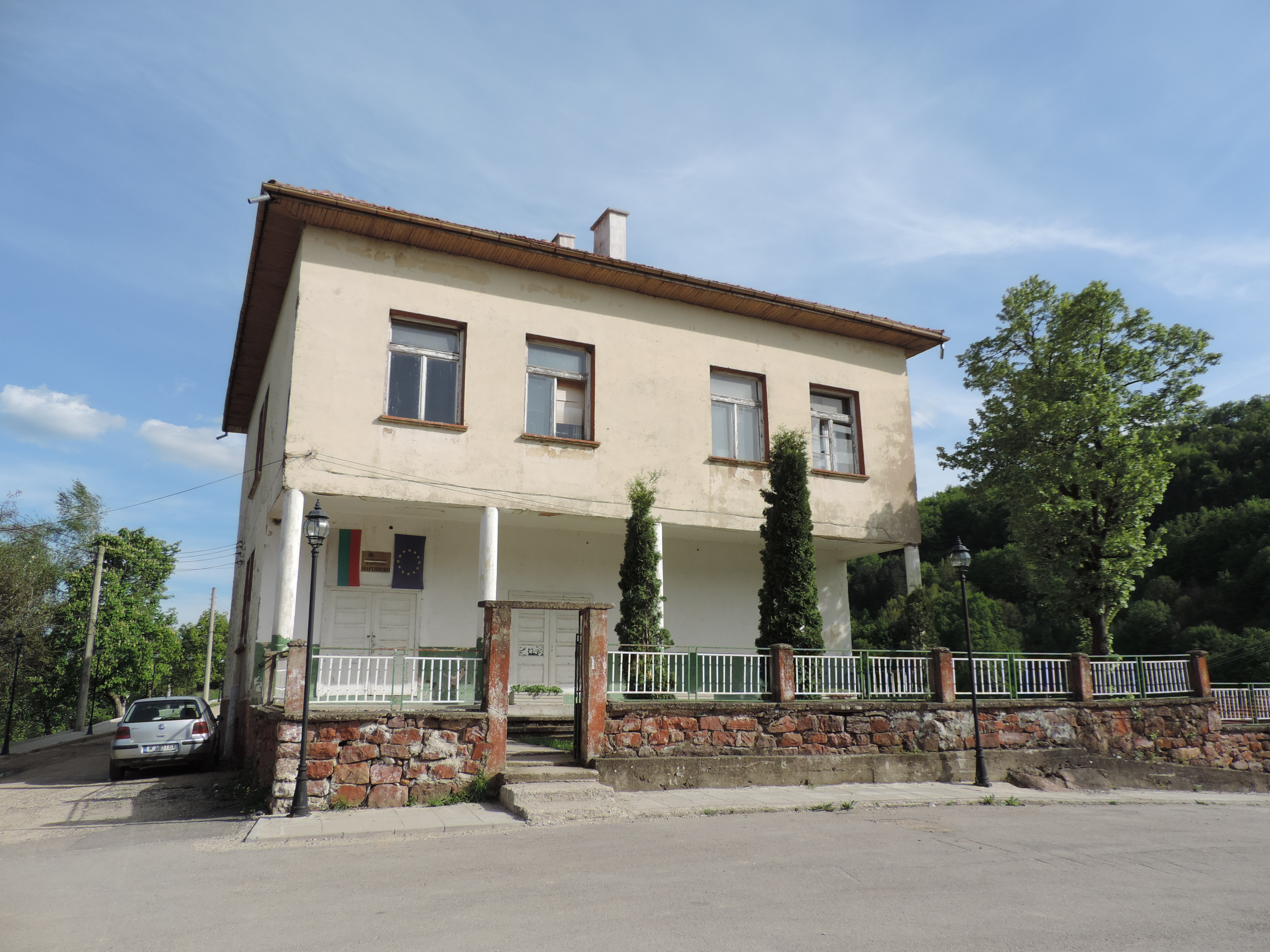
- Village hall
- Interactive map of Martinovo
- Location within Bulgaria
- Country: Bulgaria
- Province: Montana
- Municipalities of Bulgaria: Chiprovtsi

Area
  - Total: 35.887 km^{2} (13.856 sq mi)
- Elevation: 638 m (2,093 ft)

Martinovo (Bulgarian: Мартиново) is a village in northwestern Bulgaria, part of Chiprovtsi Municipality, Montana Province.
