= Javorska Ravna Gora =

Coordinates: 43.4728°N 20.1028°E

Javorska Ravna Gora Јаворска Равна Гора
- Village
- Interactive map of Javorska Ravna Gora
- Country: Serbia
- District: Moravica District
- Municipality: Ivanjica

Area
  - Total: 26.45 km^{2} (10.21 sq mi)

Population (2011)
  - Total: 96
  - Density: 3.6/km^{2} (9.4/sq mi)
- Time zone: UTC+1 (CET)
  - Summer (DST): UTC+2 (CEST)

Javorska Ravna Gora is a village in the municipality of Ivanjica, Serbia. According to the 2011 census, the village has a population of 96 inhabitants.
