= Ravna, Montana Province =

Coordinates: 43°23′12″N 22°57′33″E

Ravna (Bulgarian: Равна) is a village in northwestern Bulgaria, part of the Chiprovtsi Municipality in the Montana Province. In 2021 it had a population of 25 people.
