= Fortress of Deva =

Castle in Deva, Hunedoara County, Romania

Coordinates: 45°53′19″N 22°53′50″E

The Fortress of Deva Cetatea Devei Déva vára
- Deva, Hunedoara County, Romania
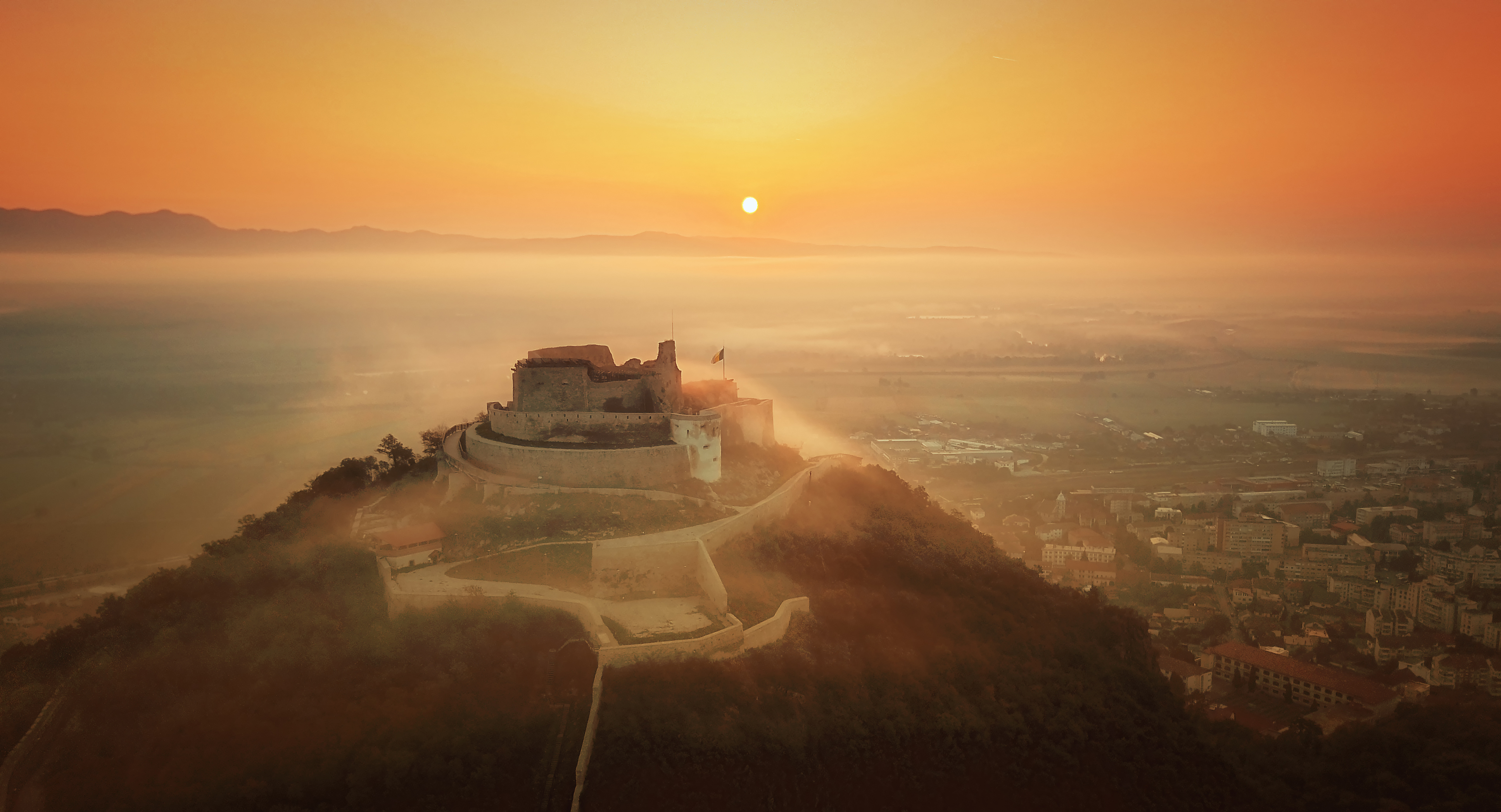
- Fortress of Deva as seen from above

Site information
- Type: Fortress
- Open to the public: yes
- Condition: ruins in reconstruction
- Website: http://cetateadeva.ro/

Site history
- Built: after 1242
- In use: 1269–1848
- Events: Peter I Csák, Palatine of Hungary defeated the Cumans, Ferenc Dávid died in the fortress's prison, Horea, Cloșca and Crișan's revolt besieged (unsuccessfully) the fortress

Garrison information
- Occupants: John Hunyadi, Gabriel Bethlen

The Fortress of Deva (Romanian: Cetatea Devei, Hungarian: Déva vára) is a fortress located in the city of Deva, Hunedoara County, Romania, on top of a volcanic hill.

== Position ==
The fortress is located atop a volcano in the Poiana Ruscă Mountain Range within the Western Carpathian Mountains of Romania. From the foot of the hill, the city of Deva spreads out, beginning with Magna Curia and the public park. Nearby are most of the buildings of the administrative institutions of the city: the Court House, the Prefecture, the County Hall, the Finance Administration, the old police headquarters, the City Hall and two of the oldest schools in Deva: the Decebal National College and the Pedagogic Lyceum. The fortress is connected with the foot of the hill by an inclined lift which allows tourists to reach the fortress.

== History ==
The Roman conquerors strengthened the walls and defended this fortification, the trade road that connected with the rest of the empire, also called the salt road, passed right at the foot of the Hill. And the Mures basin experienced maximum economic prosperity at the time. In the great year 1269, Deva Fortress is mentioned in a deed of donation of the young Hungarian king Stefan, son of Bela IV, who makes a donation to a Wallachian count for the bravery shown in the battle fought under the walls of Deva Fortress. Then, in 1444, Hungarian John Hunyadi took possession of the Deva Fortress with all its riches: 56 villages and gold mines. Also during his time is mentioned for the first time in a written document the fair of Deva, a settlement at the base of the hill. The Hungarian Corvin family took control of the fortress and domain of Deva in 1504. The first evidence of the medieval Deva Fortress dates back to the second half of the 13th century; in 1269, Stephen V, King of Hungary and Duke of Transylvania, mentioned "the royal castle of Deva" in a privilege-grant for the Count Chyl of Kelling.

The first records regarding a military operation involving the fortress dates from 1273. Under its walls, the Cumans were defeated by Peter I Csák, Palatine of Hungary (Latin: Magister Petrus de genere Chak), who was rewarded for his victory by Ladislaus IV, King of Hungary. In his letter, Ladislaus IV mentioned the facts with the words sub castro Dewa contra Cumanorum exercitur viriliter dimicavit, "fought bravely against the Cumans under the Castle of Deva".

At the end of the 13th century, the Deva Fortress was in the property of Ladislaus Kán, Voivode of Transylvania, who organized a court besides the military garrison.

The Fortress of Deva is central to the Hungarian folk tale The Wife of Clement, the Mason.

== Gallery ==
Historical sketch depicting the Citadel of Deva from the Swedish-language encyclopedia Nordisk familjebok.

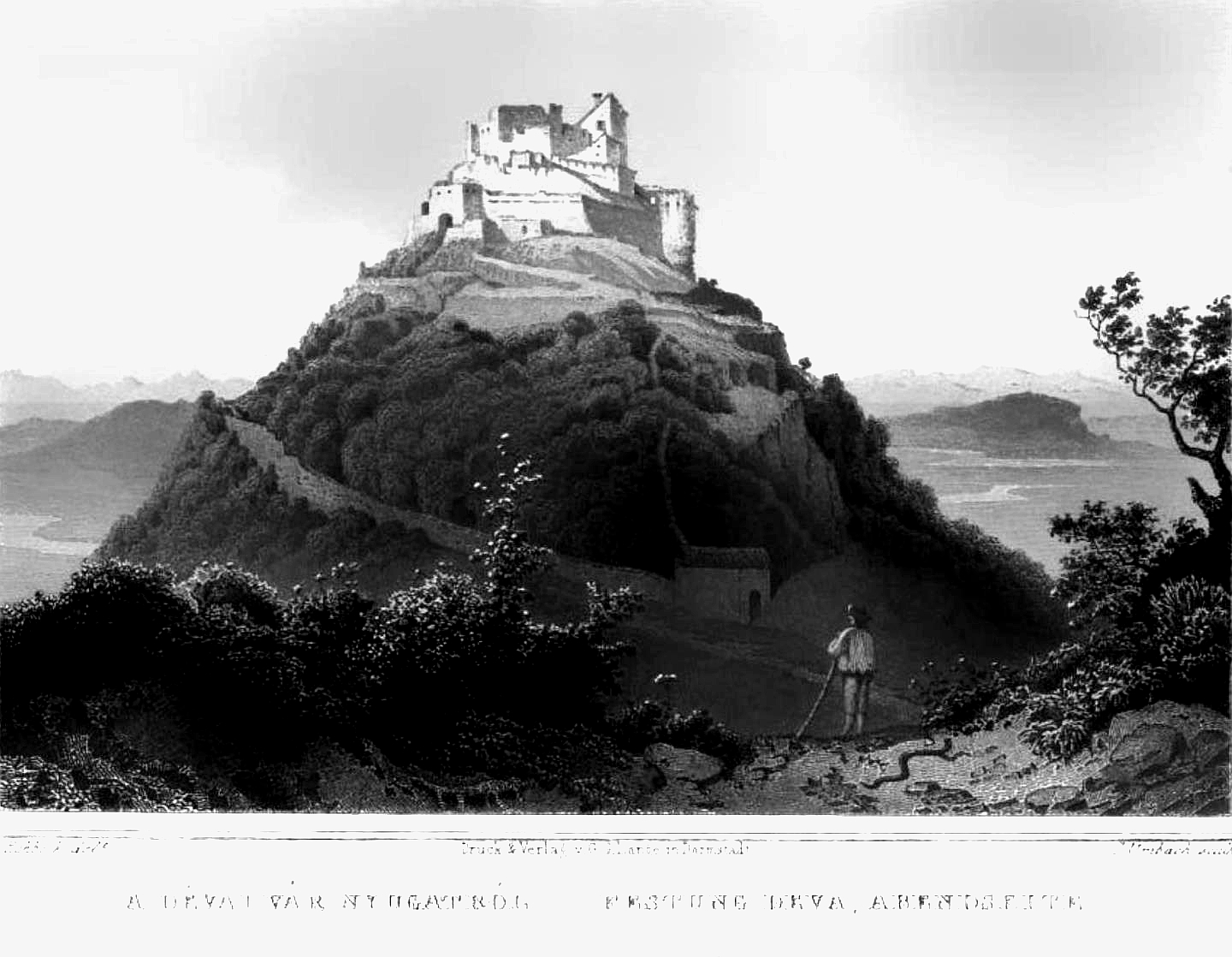
Late 19th century litography of Deva Citadel by German artist Ludwig Rohbock.

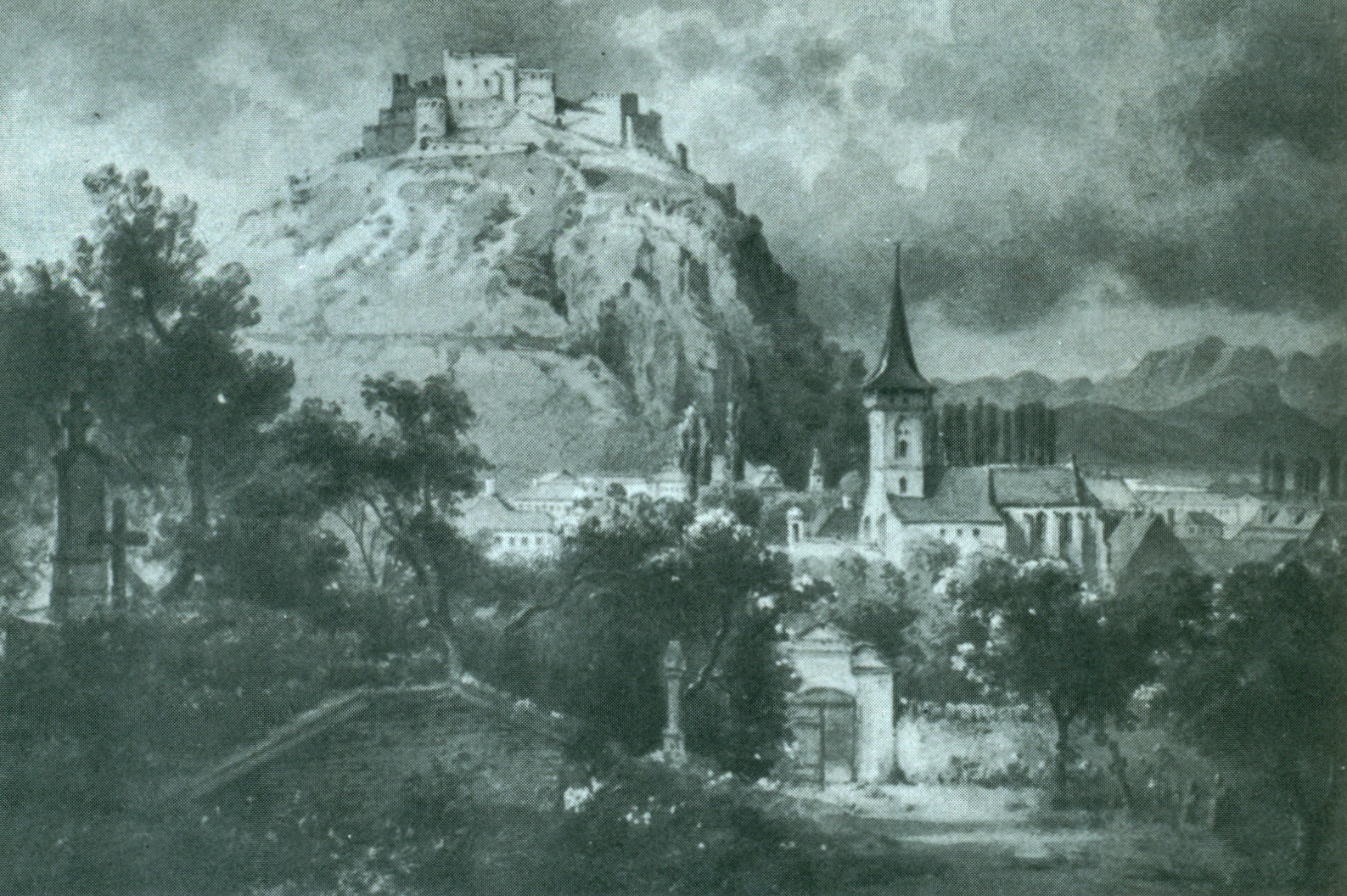
Late 19th century litography of Deva Citadel by German artist Ludwig Rohbock.

Aerial footage depicting the Fortress of Deva.

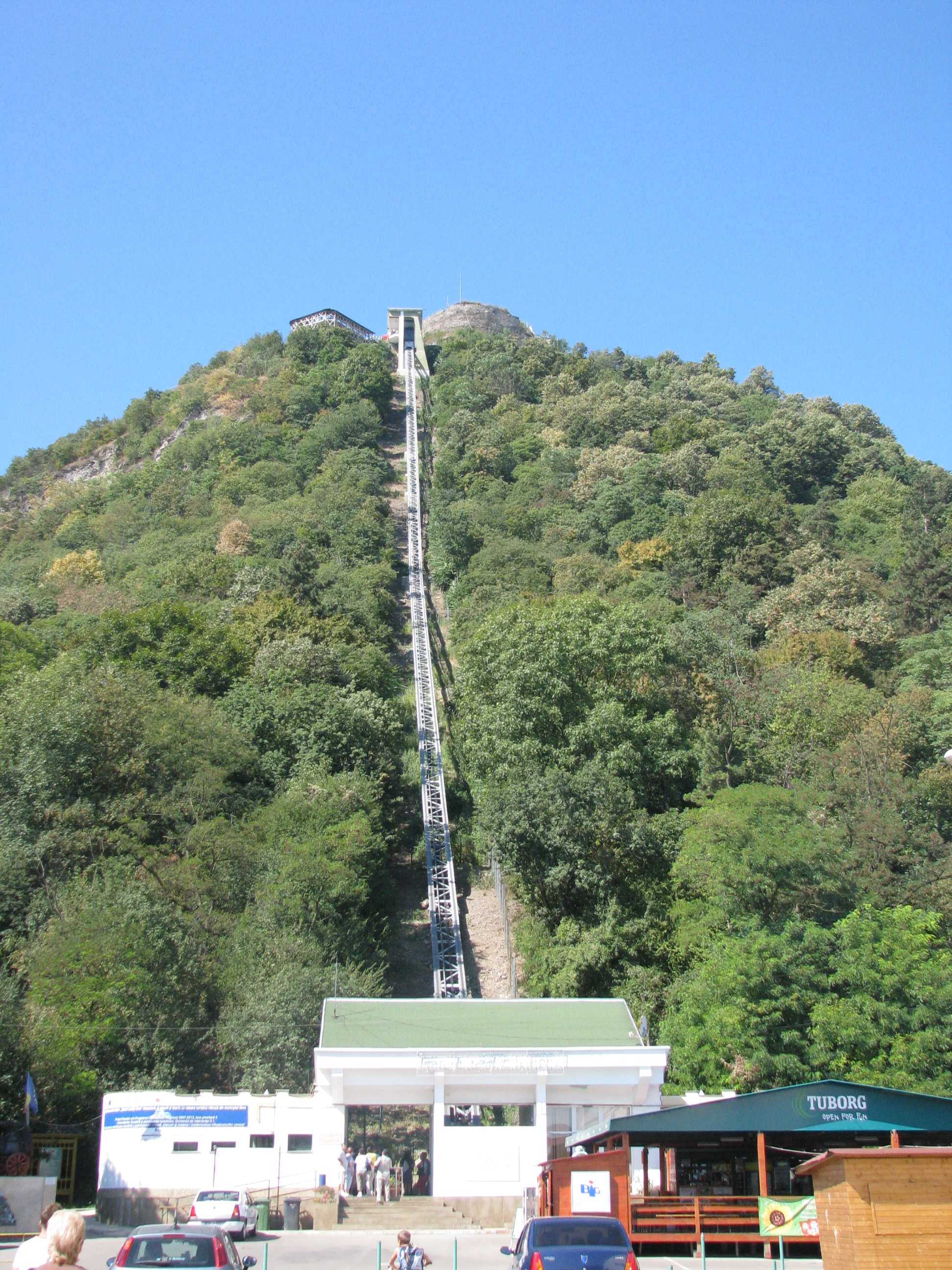
An inclined lift connects the fortress with the city below.
