= Ravina Project Toronto =

Coordinates: 43.6787°N 79.3386°W

The Ravina Project

General information
- Location: Toronto, Ontario, Canada

Website
- http://www.theravinaproject.org/

The Ravina Project is a privately run research project, dedicated to educating people about the impacts of home ownership on climate change.

== Overview ==
Susan and Gordon Fraser, a retired couple who converted their 1920s-era Toronto home into an engineering science experiment starting on November 1, 2006. The home features solar panels which in turn charge batteries to supply energy to the house when grid connectivity is disrupted, as well as a bi-directional interface to the power grid, permitting the home to both draw from and supply to the grid. The home also features a variety of applications for insulating walls, windows, and doors.

In 2008 the solar array was modified using an extendable arm made for satellite TVs in order to tilt the solar panels to maximize energy generation. The array can be viewed at any time, via a camera mounted on a neighbor's roof and the array can be re-positioned via a computer in the home. The Ravina Project publishes data frequently to indicate how well a particular improvement contributes to heating efficiency or power generation, and regularly produces research papers to explain the impact of particular endeavours. For example, one recent paper reveals the Ravina Project achieved a 31.9% cost savings on heating bills over the baseline, measured in 2005. In addition to cost-savings, the Ravina Project is able to supply electricity to neighbouring homes, as 60% of the energy collected from the home's solar panels gets fed back to the grid. Susan and Gordon Fraser present on their research often. At the Ontario Good Road Association conference in February 2017, Gordon Fraser reported that laying panels flat during the winter was the orientation that produced most effective electricity generation.
