= Zhelezna =

Village in northwestern Bulgaria

Zhelezna Железна
- Village
- Interactive map of Zhelezna
- Coordinates: 43°23′N 22°55′E
- Country: Bulgaria
- Province: Montana
- Municipality: Chiprovtsi
- Time zone: UTC+2 (EET)
  - Summer (DST): UTC+3 (EEST)

Zhelezna (Bulgarian: Железна) is a village in northwestern Bulgaria, part of Chiprovtsi Municipality, Montana Province.
