= Deva, Romania =

Deva
- Municipality
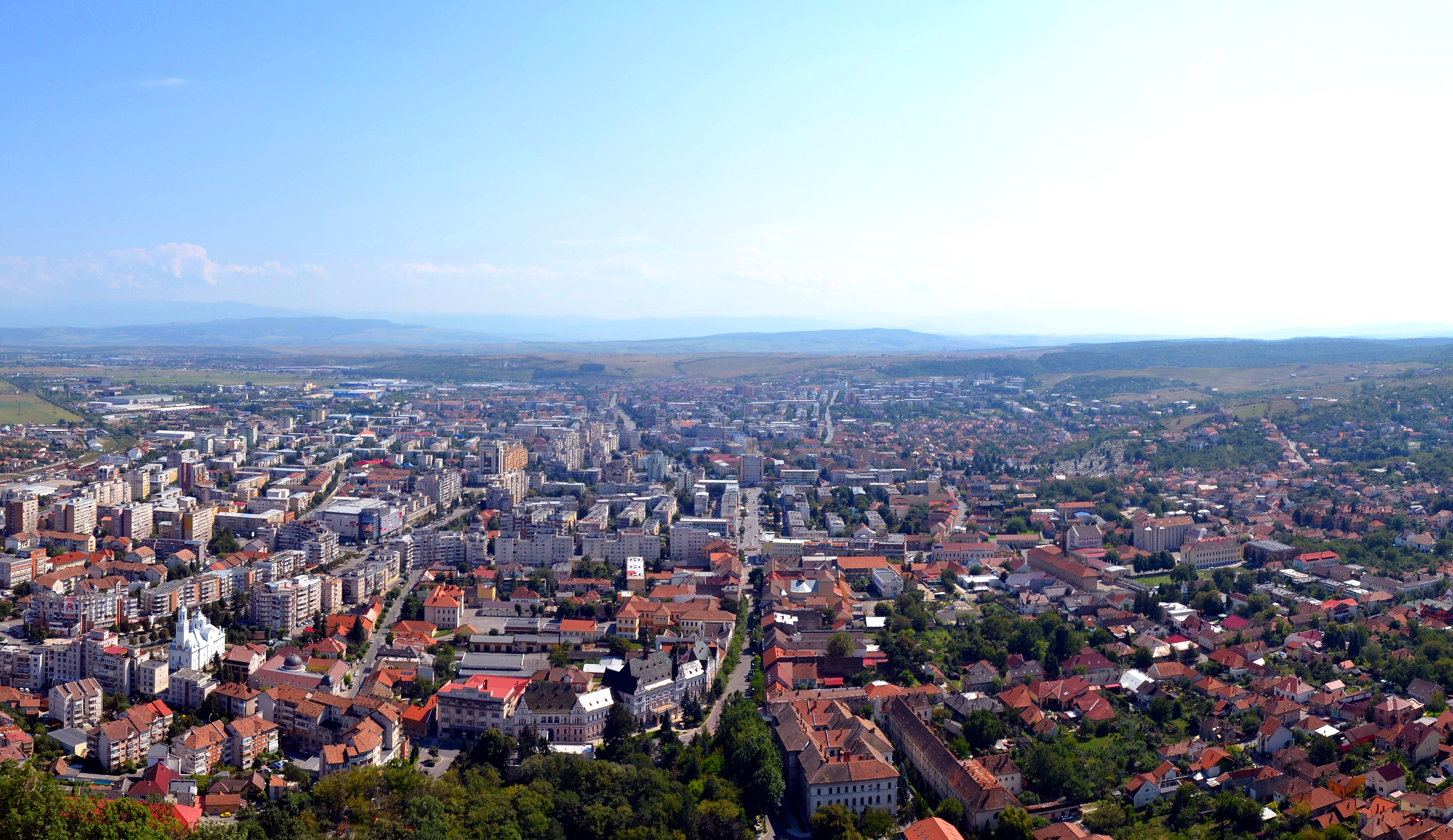
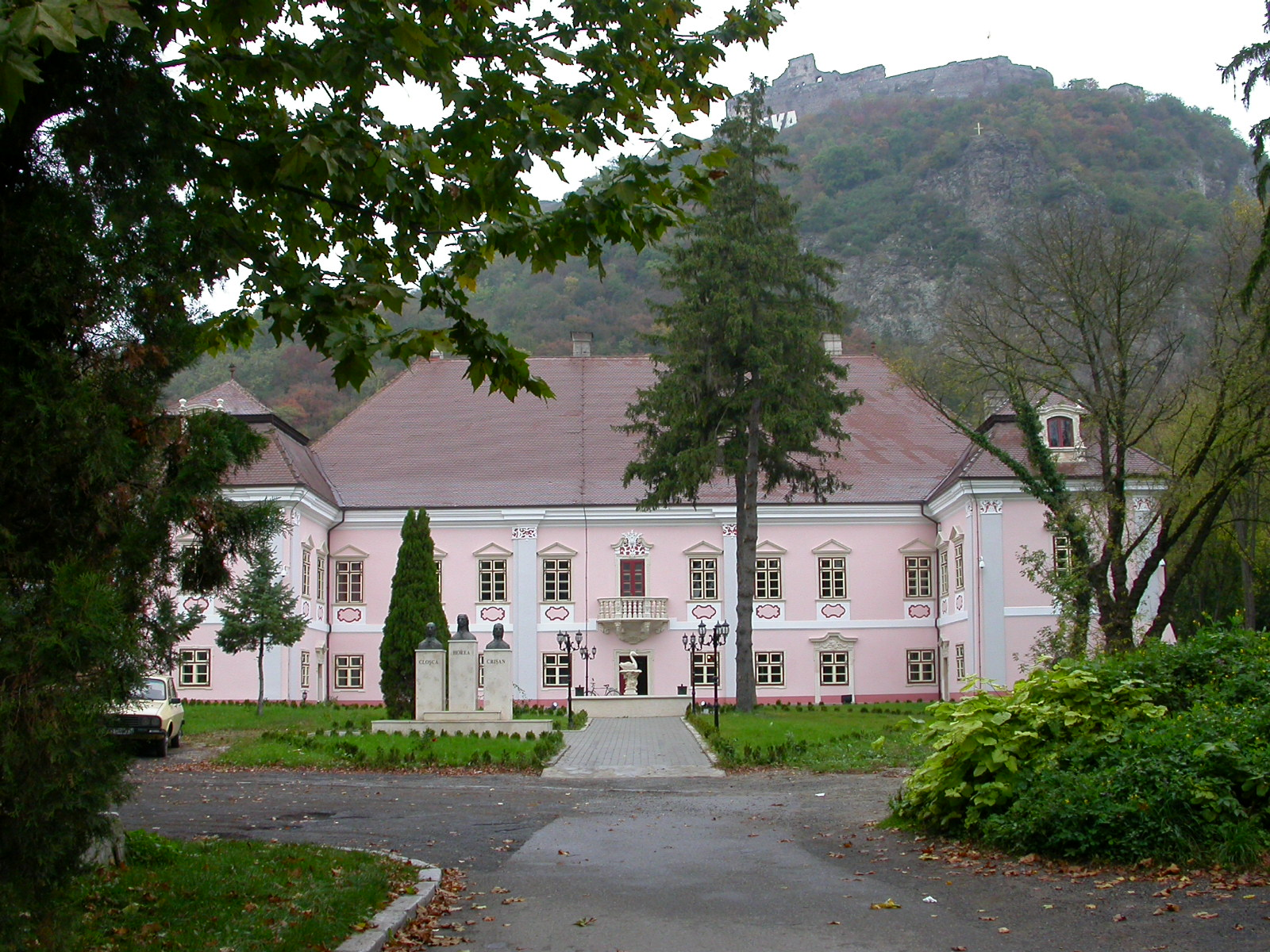
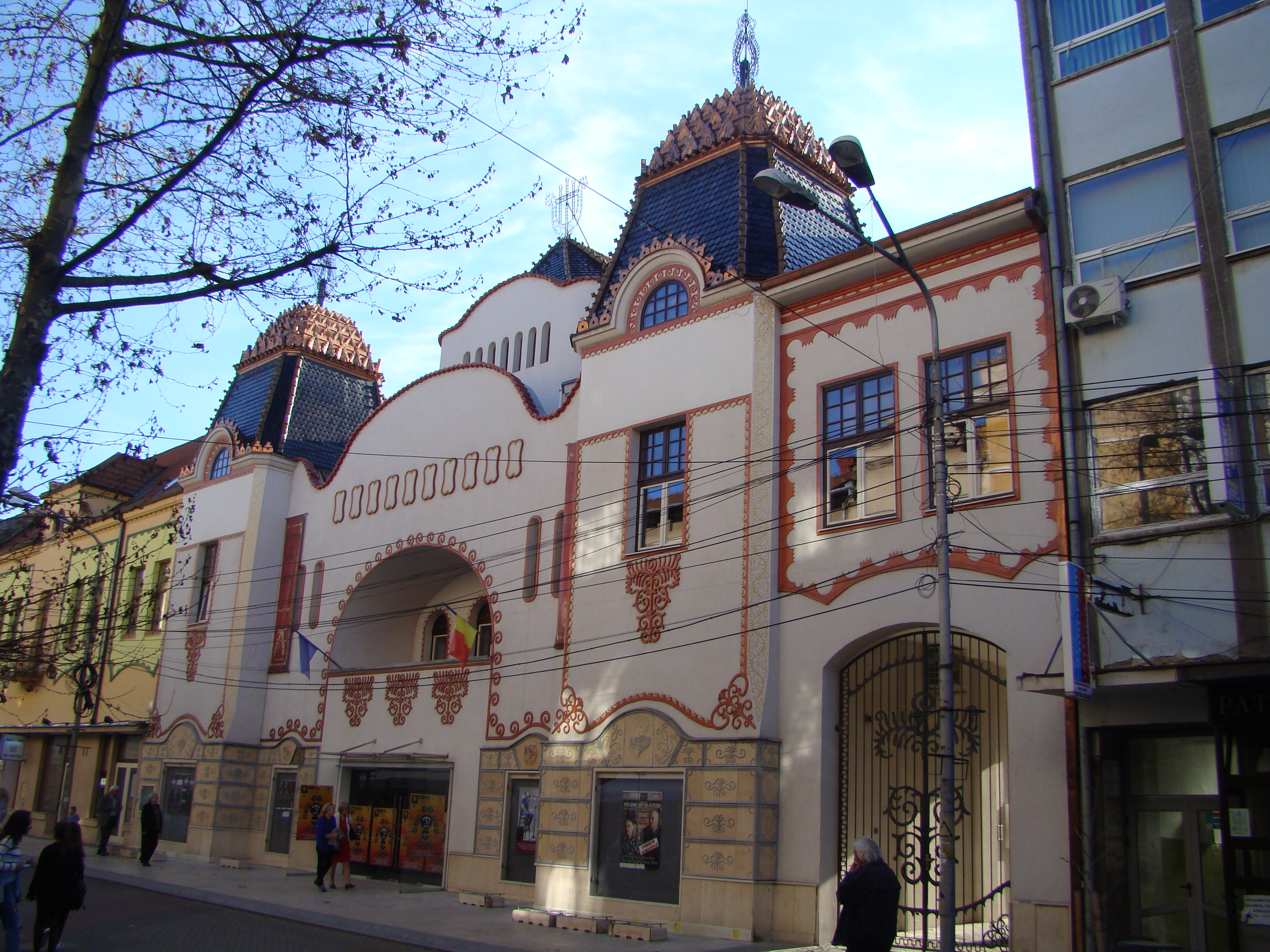
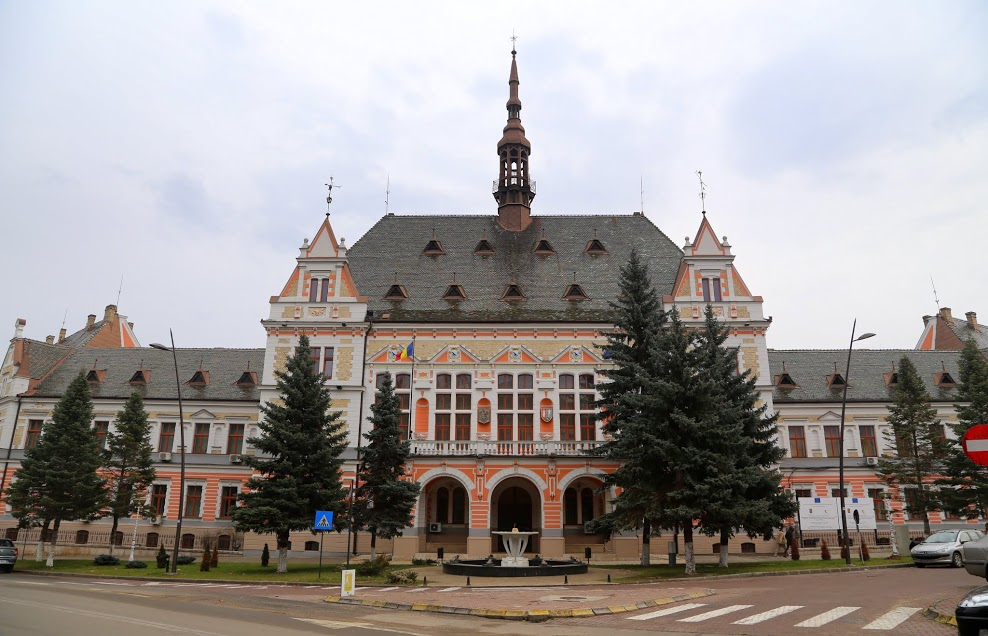
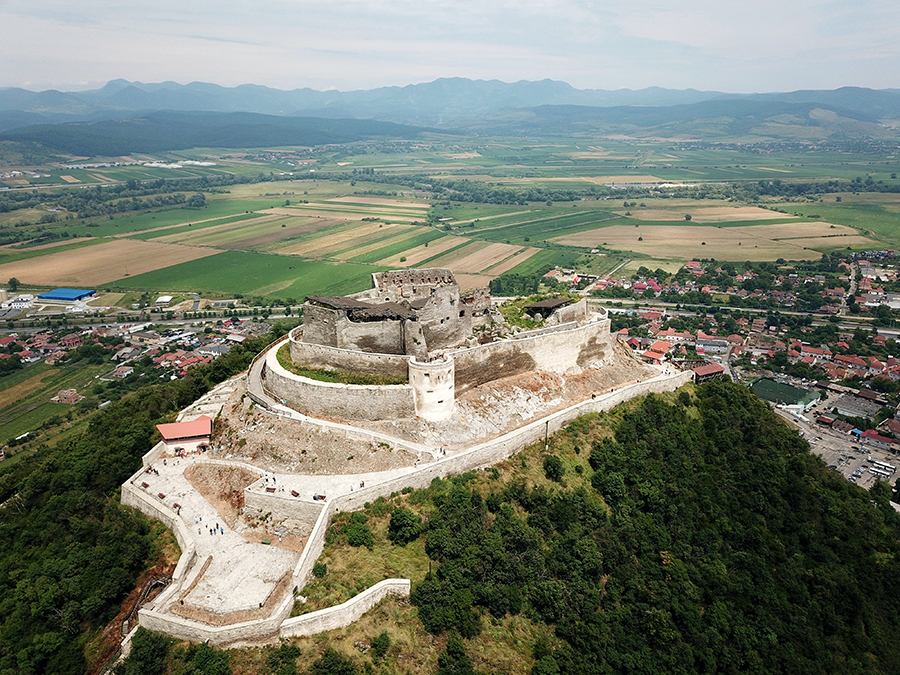
- Deva viewed from the fortress hill Magna Curia Castle Art Theatre Hunedoara County Prefecture Fortress of Deva

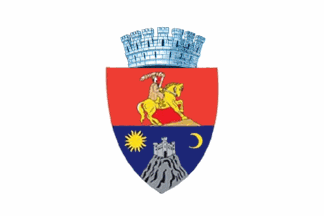
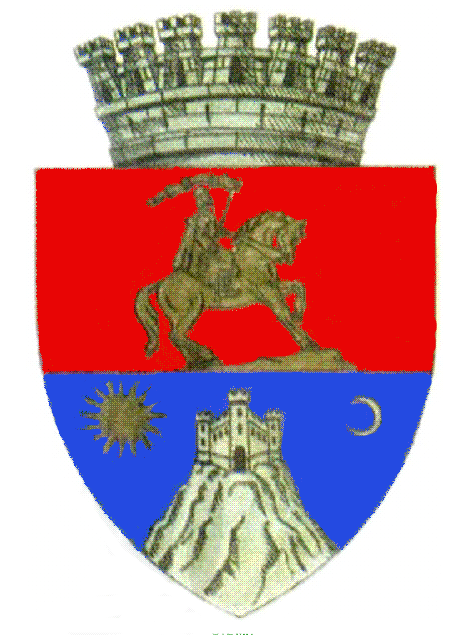
- Flag Coat of arms

- Location in Hunedoara County

- Location in Romania
- Coordinates: 45°52′41″N 22°54′52″E
- Country: Romania
- County: Hunedoara
- Established: 1269 (first mention)
- Subdivisions: Archia, Bârcea Mică, Cristur, Sântuhalm

Government
  - Mayor (2024–2028): Lucian-Ioan Rus (PSD)
- Area: 60.03 km^{2} (23.18 sq mi)
- Elevation: 187 m (614 ft)
- Population (2021-12-01): 53,113
  - Density: 884.8/km^{2} (2,292/sq mi)
- Time zone: UTC+02:00 (EET)
  - Summer (DST): UTC+03:00 (EEST)
- Postal code: 330005–330260
- Area code: +40 a54
- Vehicle reg.: HD
- Website: www.primariadeva.ro

Deva (Romanian pronunciation: [ˈdeva]; Hungarian: Déva, Hungarian pronunciation: [ˈdeːvɒ]; German: Diemrich, Schlossberg, Denburg; Latin: Sargetia;) is a city in Romania, in the historical region of Transylvania, on the left bank of the river Mureș. It is the capital of Hunedoara County.

== Name ==
Its name was first recorded in 1269 as castrum Dewa. The origin of the name gave rise to controversy. It is considered that the name comes from the ancient Dacian word dava, meaning "fortress" (as in Pelendava, Piroboridava, or Zargidava). Other theories trace the name to a Roman Legion, the Legio II Augusta, transferred to Deva from Castrum Deva, now Chester (Deva Victrix) in Britain. János András Vistai assume the name is of old Turkic origin from the name Gyeücsa. Others assert that the name is probably of Slavic origin where Deva or Devín means "girl" or "maiden" (a similar case exists in Slovak for the Devín Castle, located at the confluence of the Danube and Great Morava, at the site of the former town of Devín) or from the Old Hungarian name Győ. Additionally, it is possible the name Deva was derived from the reconstructed proto-Indo-European dhewa ("settlement"). On medieval maps Deva appears as: Dewan (first mention), Deva, or later Diemrich.

== History ==
Documentary evidence of the city's existence first appeared in 1269 when Stephen V, King of Hungary and Duke of Transylvania, mentioned "the royal castle of Deva" in a privilege-grant for the Count Chyl of Kelling (Romanian: comitele Chyl din Câlnic). In the 14th century Deva with its surrounding villages were part of a Romanian district, and the citadel had four seats under its jurisdiction (Deva, Ilia, Șoimuș, the estates of Criș and the surroundings of Brad), which were part of the royal domain and were ruled by knezes. Partially destroyed by the Ottoman Turks in 1550, it was afterward rebuilt and the fortress extended. In 1621 Prince Gabriel Bethlen transformed and extended the Magna Curia Palace (also known as the Bethlen Castle) in Renaissance style.

In 1711–1712, Deva was settled by a group of Roman Catholic Bulgarian merchant refugees from the unsuccessful anti-Ottoman Chiprovtsi Uprising of 1688. The refugees were originally mostly from Chiprovtsi and Zhelezna, though also from the neighbouring Kopilovtsi and Klisura. However, the refugees came to Deva from Wallachia and from Alvinc (now Vinţu de Jos, Romania), where a similar colony had been established in 1700.

They numbered in 1716 51 families and three Franciscan friars, established their own neighbourhood, which was known to the locals as Greci ("Greeks", i.e. "merchants"). Their influence over local affairs caused Deva to be officially called a "Bulgarian town" for a short period, even though the maximum population of the colony was 71 families in 1721. The Bulgarians received royal privileges of the Austrian crown along with their permission to settle and their acquisition of land and property. The construction of Deva's Franciscan friary commenced in 1724 with the funding and efforts of its Bulgarian population, so that the monastery was commonly known as the Bulgarian Monastery. However, the Great Plague of 1738 and the gradual assimilation of the Deva Bulgarians into other ethnicities of Transylvania prevented the colony from growing and by the late 19th century the Bulgarian ethnic element in the town had disappeared completely.

=== Jewish history ===
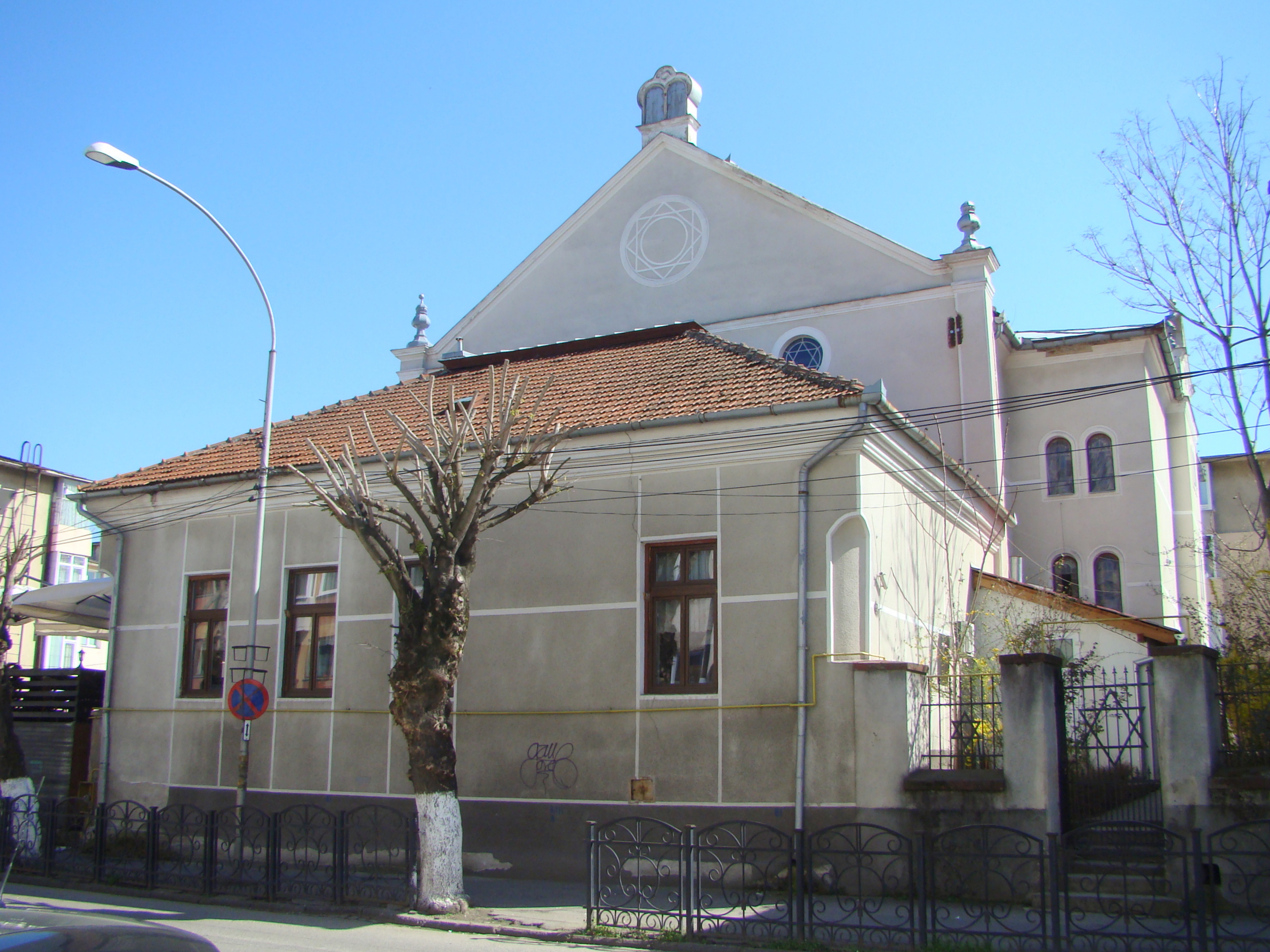
Deva synagogue

Jews first settled in the town in the 1830s, organizing a community in 1848. Rabbi Moshe Herzog (1893–1898) delivered patriotic sermons in Hungarian. The synagogue was rebuilt in 1925. In 1923, the strictly Orthodox established their own congregation under Hayyim Yehuda Ehrenreich, a rabbinical scholar whose periodical Otzar ha-Hayyim became renowned in Jewish academic circles. In 1927, he set up a press that printed classical Hebrew works.

Zionist organizations were especially active in the mid-1920s. In 1930, there were 914 Jews, or 8.7% of the total. On 5 December 1940, during the National Legionary State, Jewish merchants were forced to give up their shops to members of the ruling Iron Guard. In June 1941, when Romania entered World War II, 695 Jewish refugees from surrounding villages were brought to Deva. In the war's aftermath, many remained there. There were 1190 Jews in 1947; the majority emigrated to Israel after 1948.

== Demographics ==
Historical population
Year	Pop.	±%
1850	2,129	—
1910	8,594	+303.7%
1912	8,654	+0.7%
1930	10,509	+21.4%
1941	17,456	+66.1%
1948	12,959	−25.8%
1956	16,879	+30.2%
1966	26,969	+59.8%
1977	60,334	+123.7%
1992	78,438	+30.0%
2002	69,390	−11.5%
2011	61,123	−11.9%
2021	53,113	−13.1%
Source: Census data

In 1850, the town had 2,129 inhabitants, of which 1,038 were Romanians (48.8%), 517 Hungarians (24.3%), 255 Germans (12%), 216 Roma (10.1%) and 103 (4.8%) of other ethnicities, meanwhile in 1912, out of 8,654 inhabitants, 5,827 were Hungarians (67.33%), 2,417 Romanians (27.92%), 276 Germans (3.18%) and 134 (1.57%) of other ethnicities.

At the 2011 census, there were 56,647 people living within the city, making it the 37th largest city in Romania. The ethnic makeup in 2011 was as follows: 89.67% Romanians, 7.79% Hungarians, 1.6% Roma, and 0.91% other. At the 2021 census, Deva had a population of 53,113; of those, 74.28% were Romanians, 5.33% Hungarians, and 19.42% other.

== Economy ==
Automotive, commerce, construction materials and power industries are important to Deva's economy.

== Geography ==
Deva is situated in the central part of Hunedoara County, on the left bank of the middle course of the Mureș River at 187 m above sea level. The city administers four villages: Archia (Árki), Bârcea Mică (Kisbarcsa), Cristur (Csernakeresztúr) and Sântuhalm (Szántóhalma).

=== Climate ===
Deva has a humid continental climate (Koppen: Dfb). Located at a relatively low altitude within a depression, Deva has the mildest climate in Transylvania, as it is sheltered from strong currents. The air flows in from the west and northwest. Along the Mureș corridor, sub-Mediterranean influences can be felt, meanwhile, damp Atlantic air masses do not affect the city, which is protected by the Apuseni Mountains and the Poiana Ruscă Mountains. Summers are not excessively hot, and winters are mild, characterized by a lack of severe frosts.

Climate data for Deva
Month	Jan	Feb	Mar	Apr	May	Jun	Jul	Aug	Sep	Oct	Nov	Dec	Year
Record high °C (°F)	16.7 (62.1)	20.9 (69.6)	28.5 (83.3)	32.3 (90.1)	34.6 (94.3)	37.9 (100.2)	40.0 (104.0)	39.7 (103.5)	38.2 (100.8)	33.1 (91.6)	27.4 (81.3)	19.8 (67.6)	40.0 (104.0)
Mean daily maximum °C (°F)	2.7 (36.9)	6.3 (43.3)	12.1 (53.8)	18.3 (64.9)	22.9 (73.2)	26.4 (79.5)	28.4 (83.1)	28.8 (83.8)	23.1 (73.6)	17.3 (63.1)	9.9 (49.8)	3.5 (38.3)	16.6 (61.9)
Daily mean °C (°F)	−1.2 (29.8)	1.0 (33.8)	5.7 (42.3)	11.3 (52.3)	15.8 (60.4)	19.4 (66.9)	21.1 (70.0)	20.9 (69.6)	15.8 (60.4)	10.4 (50.7)	5.0 (41.0)	0.1 (32.2)	10.4 (50.7)
Mean daily minimum °C (°F)	−4.3 (24.3)	−2.8 (27.0)	0.6 (33.1)	5.3 (41.5)	9.8 (49.6)	13.2 (55.8)	14.6 (58.3)	14.5 (58.1)	10.4 (50.7)	5.7 (42.3)	1.4 (34.5)	−2.6 (27.3)	5.5 (41.9)
Record low °C (°F)	−31.6 (−24.9)	−28.1 (−18.6)	−22.3 (−8.1)	−8.1 (17.4)	−2.4 (27.7)	2.2 (36.0)	3.7 (38.7)	4.4 (39.9)	−4.2 (24.4)	−8.0 (17.6)	−16.6 (2.1)	−24.1 (−11.4)	−31.6 (−24.9)
Average precipitation mm (inches)	29.3 (1.15)	26.4 (1.04)	32.7 (1.29)	50.5 (1.99)	70.0 (2.76)	83.4 (3.28)	69.8 (2.75)	58.2 (2.29)	51.3 (2.02)	42.9 (1.69)	34.5 (1.36)	36.5 (1.44)	585.5 (23.05)
Average precipitation days (≥ 1.0 mm)	6.8	6.3	6.9	8.1	10.5	10.2	7.7	6.4	7.1	6.9	6.7	6.9	90.5
Mean monthly sunshine hours	70.4	104.1	160.6	189.8	221.3	249.4	268.3	262.6	190.2	153.1	86.5	54.4	2,010.7
Source: NOAA; Meteomanz; Anuarul Statistic al României 2006

== Education ==
A private University of Ecology and Tourism was established in the city in 1990, and the academic centres of Timișoara and Cluj-Napoca have opened branches in the city. Deva is also the home of Romania's national women gymnastics training center called Colegiul National Sportiv "Cetatea" Deva . Here is a list of the high schools from Deva:

- Decebal National College
- National Pedagogical College "Regina Maria"
- Colegiul Național Sportiv "Cetatea"
- Sigismund Toduță High School of Arts
- Téglás Gábor Theoretical High School
- Transylvania Technical College
- Grigore Moisil Technical High School
- Dragomir Hurmuzescu Technical College

Traian Theoretical High School was disbanded in 2014 and the students were enrolled at Decebal National College.

== Notable people ==
- François Bréda
- María Corda
- Matthias Dévay
- Matei Gall
- Anamaria Gavrilă
- Florentina Iusco
- Kocsárd Janky
- Bogdan Juratoni
- Raluca Lăzăruț
- Maria Neculiță
- Franz Nopcsa von Felső-Szilvás
- Dora Pavel
- Paul Radu
- Pál Réthy
- Daniela Silivaș
- Adrian Sitaru

== Tourism ==
Deva is dominated by the Citadel Hill, a protected nature reserve because of its rare floral species and the presence of the horned adder. Perched on the top of the hill are the ruins of the Citadel built in the 13th century. Tourists can visit the Citadel by climbing the hill or using the cable car. The machinery covers a distance of 160 meters and it can transport up to 16 people.

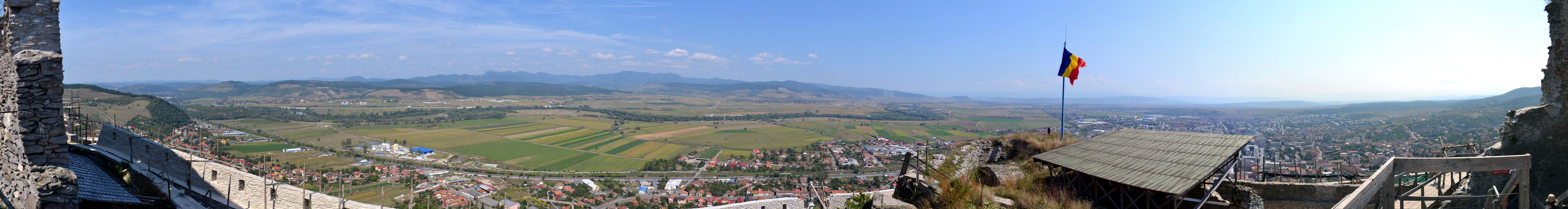
Deva seen from the Citadel (view towards the North)
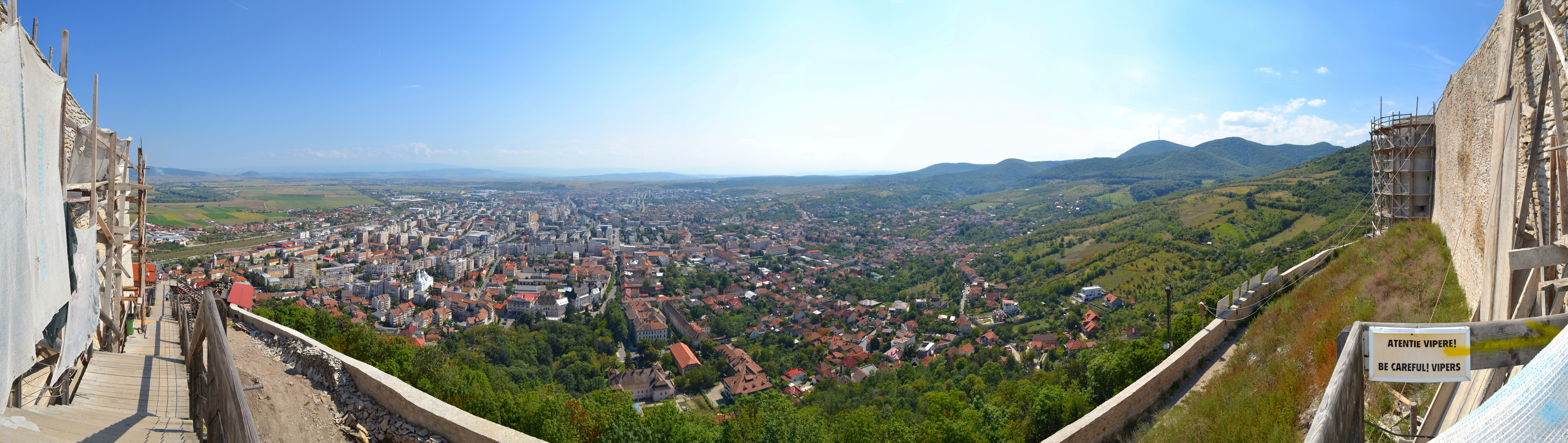
Deva seen from the Citadel (view towards the East)

Deva's tourist attractions include the Arts Theatre, the Patria Cinema, the Old Centre and the Citadel Park, where there are the statues of Mihai Eminescu and Decebal and the Magna Curia Palace. There is also the Aqualand Complex, a recently built leisure centre situated near the Citadel Park. It is an important tourist spot for the Transylvania region. Downtown the city, the House of culture and the musical fountain represent two elements that define the town centre of Deva.

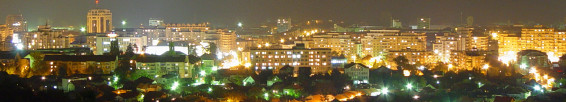
Deva by night

== Sport ==
Deva is considered the Gymnastics capital of Romania because the National gymnastics training center is located in the city. Many of the country's Olympic gymnasts have trained in Deva, including Nadia Comăneci.

== Twinned cities ==
- Arras, France
- Cherbourg-Octeville, France
- Szigetvár, Hungary
- Yancheng, China

== Photo gallery ==
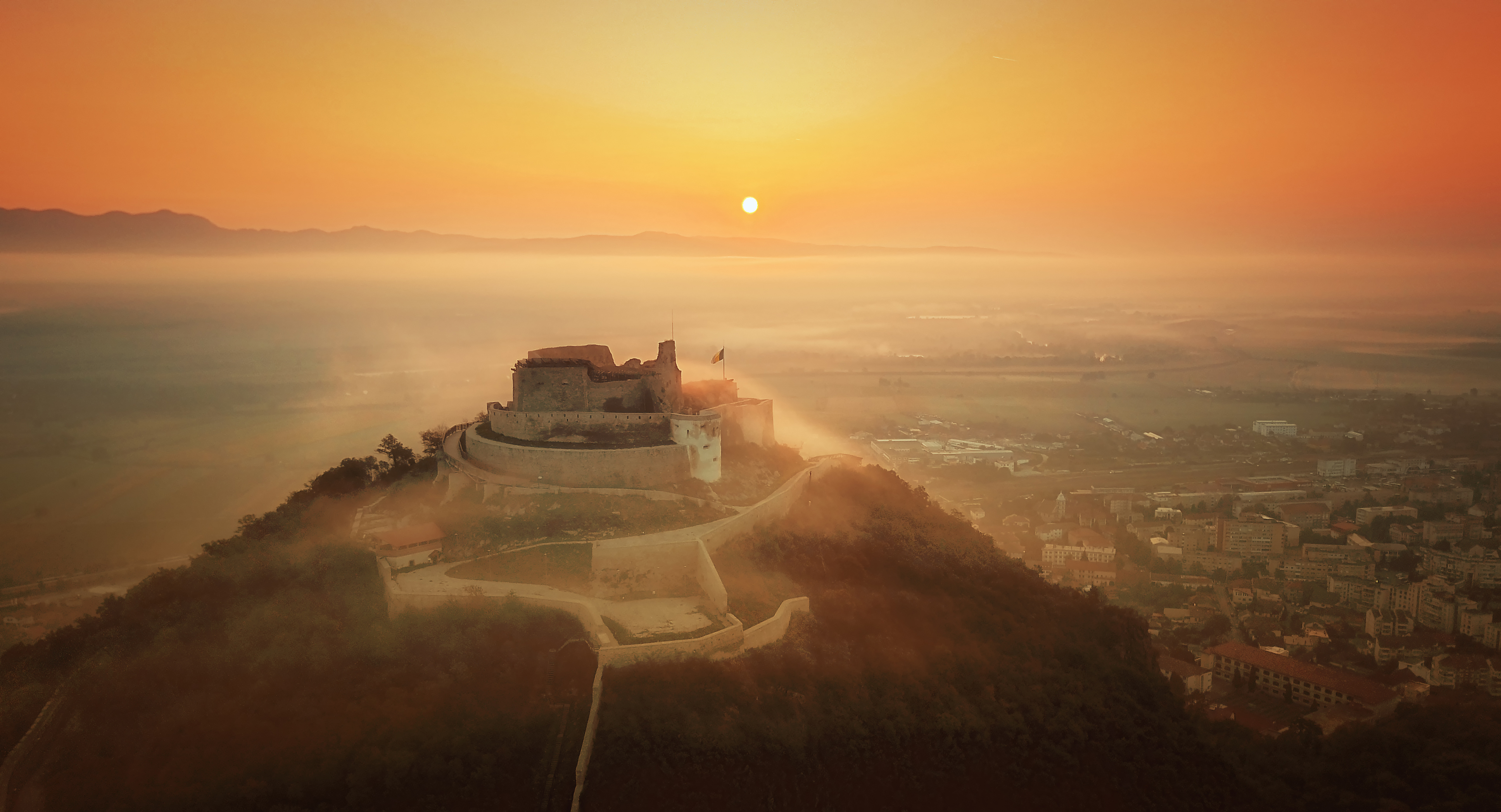
Deva Citadel

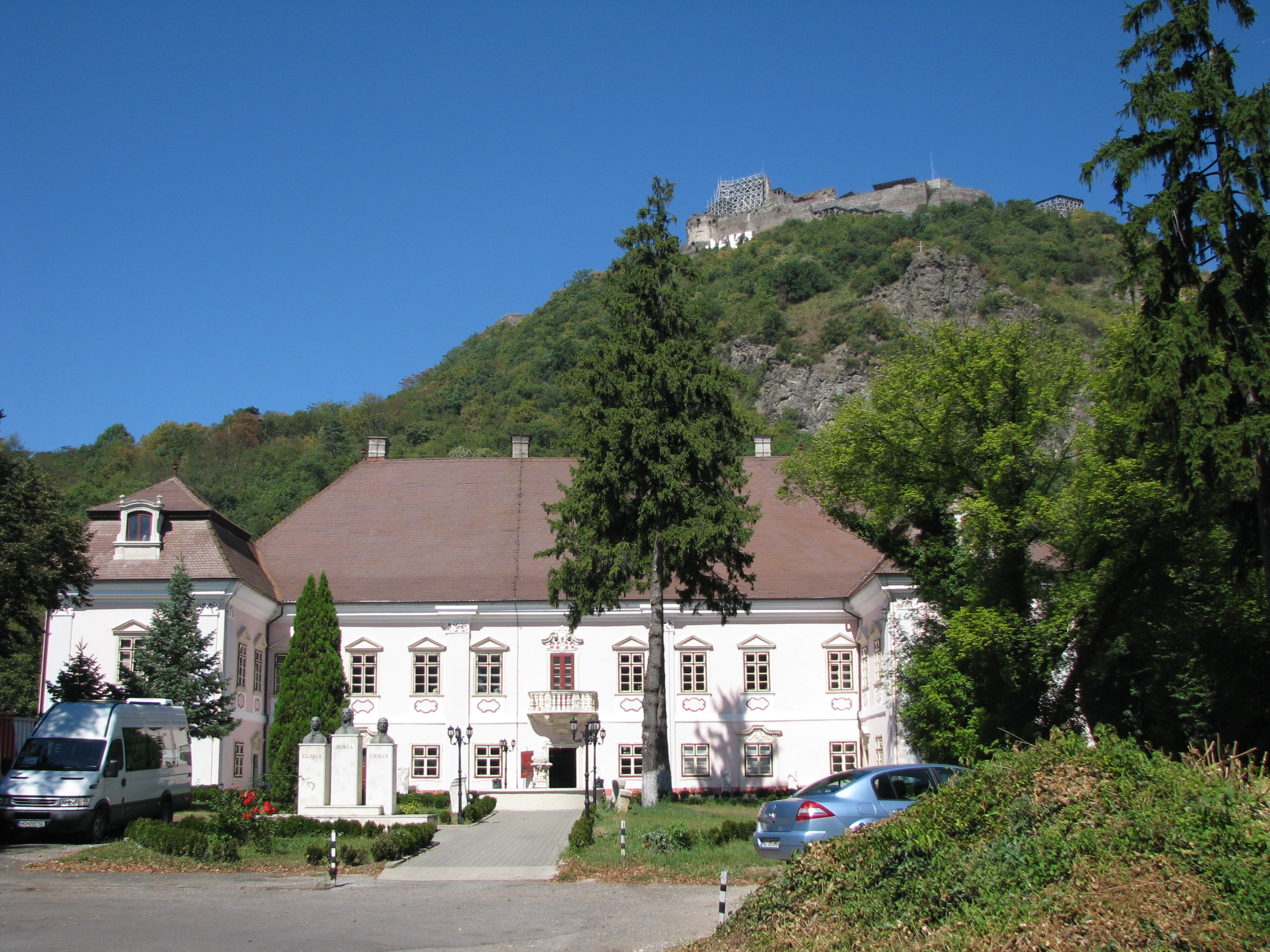
Magna Curia

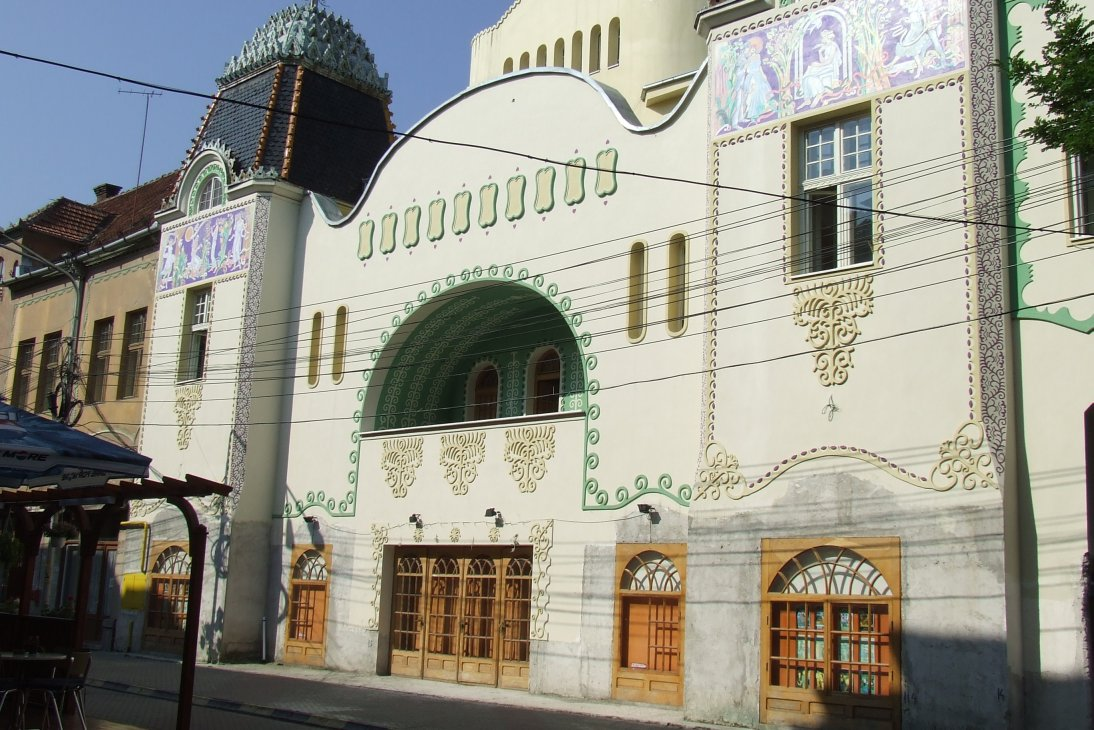
Art Theatre

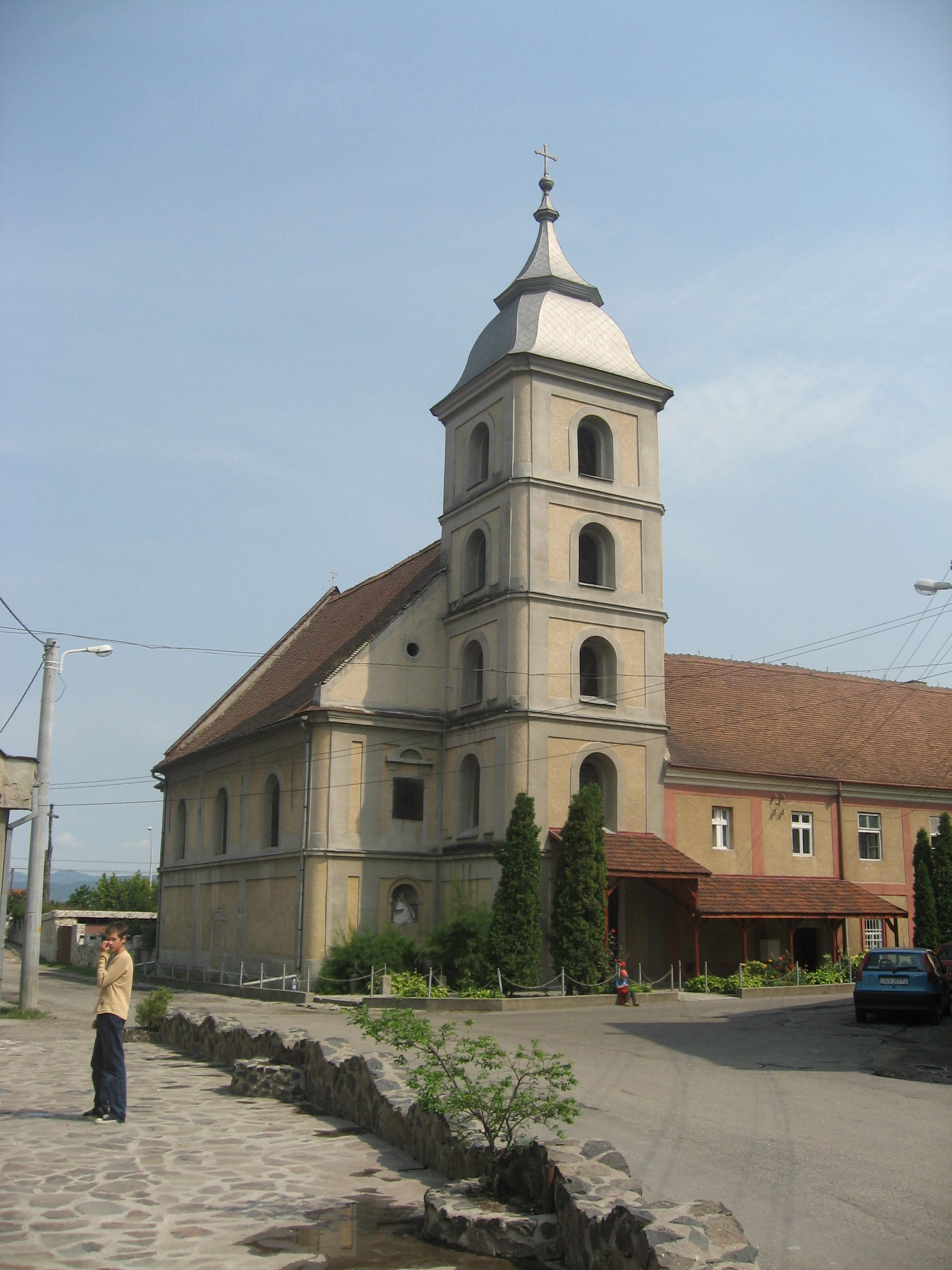
Church of the Franciscan monastery, founded by a Bulgarian colony in 1724

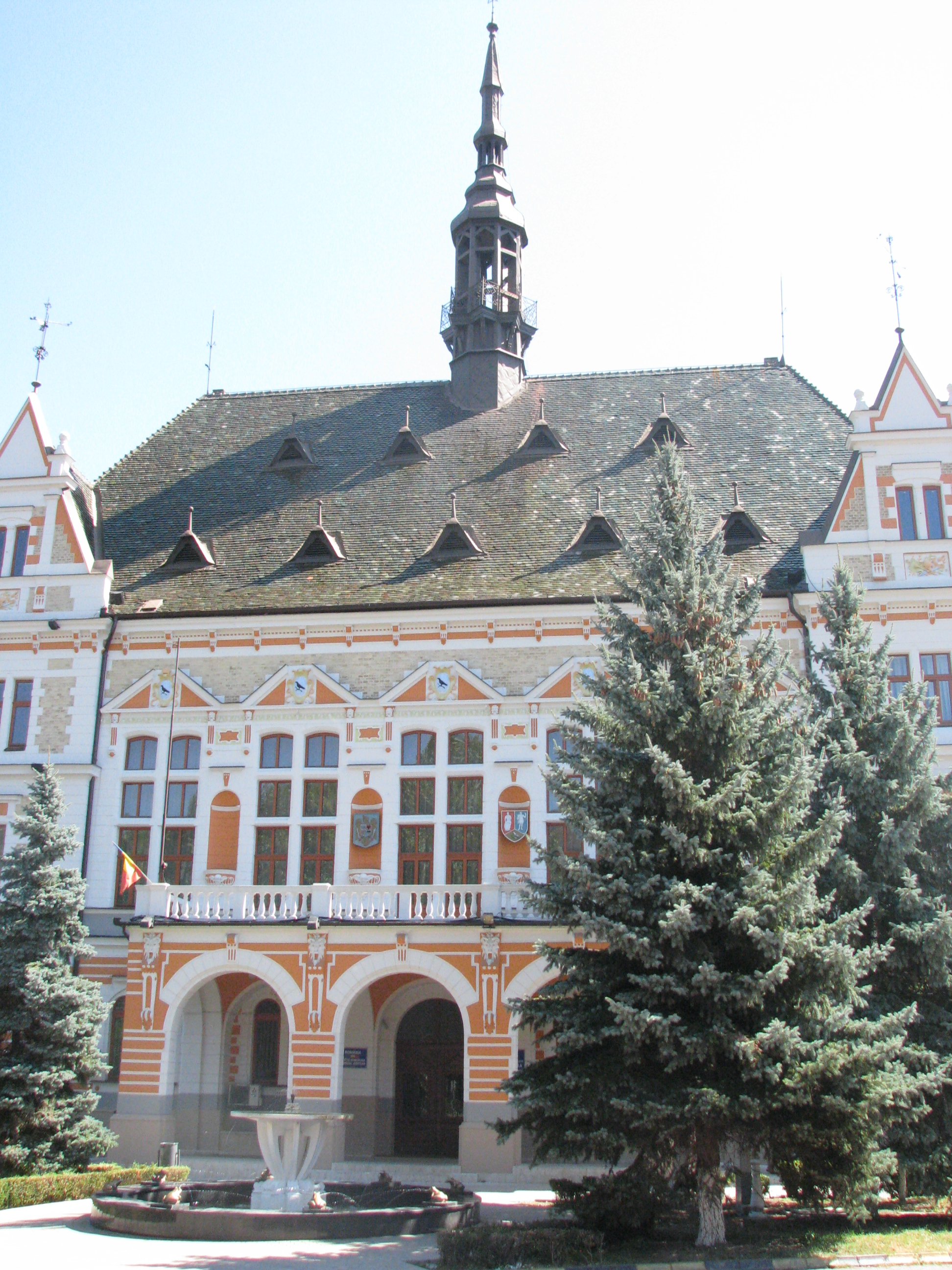
Hunedoara County Prefecture
