= Ravna (Maglaj) =

Village in Maglaj, Bosnia and Herzegovina

- Village
- Location within Bosnia and Herzegovina
- Country: Bosnia and Herzegovina
- Entity: Federation of Bosnia and Herzegovina
- Canton: Zenica-Doboj
- Municipality: Maglaj

Area
  - Total: 2.26 sq mi (5.86 km^{2})

Population (2013)
  - Total: 476
  - Density: 210/sq mi (81.2/km^{2})
- Time zone: UTC+1 (CET)
  - Summer (DST): UTC+2 (CEST)

Ravna is a village in the municipality of Maglaj, Bosnia and Herzegovina.

== Demographics ==
According to the 2013 census, its population was 476.

Ethnicity in 2013
Ethnicity	Number	Percentage
Bosniaks	471	98.9%
other/undeclared	5	1.1%
Total	476	100%
