= Ravine (disambiguation) =

A ravine is a landform similar to a thin canyon.

Ravine may also refer to:

- Ravine, Pennsylvania, U.S., a census-designated place
- Ravine, a locality in Yellowhead County, Alberta, Canada
- The Ravine, a 1969 film by Paolo Cavara
- The Ravine (novel), a 2008 novel by Paul Quarrington
- "Ravine", a song by Ace of Base from The Bridge, 1995
- The Ravine, a short story written by Graham Salisbury

== See also ==
- Ravinia (disambiguation)
