= Ravna gora, Haskovo Province =

- Village
- Location within Bulgaria
- Coordinates: 41°52′1.2″N 26°21′00″E
- Country: Bulgaria
- Province: Haskovo Province
- Municipality: Svilengrad
- Time zone: UTC+2 (EET)
  - Summer (DST): UTC+3 (EEST)

Ravna gora, Haskovo Province is a village in the municipality of Svilengrad, in Haskovo Province, in southern Bulgaria.
