= Kőműves Kelemen =

Clement Mason, a Hungarian folk tale

Kőmíves Kelemenné (Clement Mason) is a Hungarian folk tale about the building of the fortress of Deva. Originating in the 16th century, its plot derived from a folk ballad. There are several versions of this tale, with minor differences. The eponymous poem makes reference to a well-known Hungarian folk tale in which the central character – a stonemason named Kőműves Kelemen – finds that the castle he’s trying to build keeps falling down, and is forced to sacrifice his beloved wife and mix her remains into the mortar in order to make the castle stand. This is a reference familiar to almost any Hungarian reader, but clearly not obvious to the non-Hungarian.

== Summary of Plot ==
Kelemen, and 12 other bricklayers, are trying to build the castle of Déva. Every time they finish, it collapses. Believing themselves to be at the mercy of an old curse, they make an agreement; whoever's wife first appears in the construction area of the castle, will have their throat cut, corpse burned, and have her ashes mixed with the whitewash for the building. It is Kelemen's wife that makes a visit first, against the advice of her husband. The bricklayers murder her, and build her into the walls of the castle. The walls do not collapse this time, and the masons get their payment. Kelemen goes home, to see his son to tell him what he did. His son decides to visits the castle. Arriving at the spot where his mother died, he dies from his grief.

== Adaptations, extensions of the story ==
This story was adapted by Imre Sarkadi, for the first time in a short story in 1947, and then in a play (1949-53) The play remained incomplete for some time, but in the 70s it was adapted In 1982, Csaba Ivánka and re-edited to fit the drama of musical theatre. This adaptation was adopted by the notable duo of Levente Szörényi and János Bródy.

The story is easily modified as the original ballad is only about two pages long. Szörényi and Bródy introduced the character of Boldizsár, one of the masons, who was the fiendish character who wanted to build Anna, the named wife of Kelemen, into the wall. Kelemen becomes a more productive character in the elimination of his wife in this version.

== The characters ==
=== The bricklayers ===
- Kelemen, the chief, he is committed to architecture, and he represents the productive man in the story ("Alkotni születtünk, erre a földre" - "We are born to create, into this world").
- Boldizsár, the other important mason, he is also committed to the building. He is the one who comes up with the human sacrifice idea, but he knows that it's only important because it's giving faith to the people - Kelemen knows that beside him.
- Benedek, the one who wants to take back his word, he wants to skip, but only because he's afraid that his wife is coming first. The others want to kill him, but then, Anna appears, and he remain alive. Then he starts to go along with the situation, and the murder.
- Máté He is the only one who has no wife. In the beginning of the story, he is the idea of the ghosts and the curse, he wants to go home, and he encourages the others to do so.
- Karuj
- Márton
- Ambrus
- Mihály
- György
- Sebő
- Gyula
- Rádó

==== Others ====
- Anna, the wife of Kelemen
- The carter, or villager, he is the one who firstly informs the bricklayers about the old story of a woman, her child, and a box of treasure, when he brings news for Kelemen, about her wife, and his child, who is sick. After that, he wants to keep back Anna.
- Kelemen's son
