= Ravinia =

Ravinia may refer to:

- Ravinia (fly), a genus of flesh flies
- Ravinia, South Dakota, U.S., a town
- Ravinia Festival, a music festival in Highland Park, Illinois, U.S.
  - Ravinia Park station, a Metra railway station in Highland Park, Illinois, U.S., serving Ravinia Festival
- Ravinia station, a Metra railway station in Highland Park, Illinois, U.S.

== See also ==
- Ravine (disambiguation)
