= Ravna Gora (Ivanjica) =

Coordinates: 43.4728°N 20.1028°E

Ravna Gora Равна Гора
- Village
- Interactive map of Ravna Gora
- Country: Serbia
- District: Moravica District
- Municipality: Ivanjica

Area
  - Total: 5.51 km^{2} (2.13 sq mi)

Population (2011)
  - Total: 104
  - Density: 18.9/km^{2} (48.9/sq mi)
- Time zone: UTC+1 (CET)
  - Summer (DST): UTC+2 (CEST)

Ravna Gora is a village in the municipality of Ivanjica, Serbia. According to the 2011 census, the village has a population of 104 inhabitants.
