= List of Electroputere locomotives =

The following is a list of diesel and electric locomotives produced by Electroputere Craiova, Romania.

== For Romanian Railways ==
=== Diesel locomotives ===
The diesel electric locomotives employed by CFR and built by Electroputere Craiova are known as classes 60 to 68 and originally registered under the series 060-DA. They were based on a design created by SLM Winterthur, BBC Baden and Sulzer Winterthur and bears, externally, resemblance to AE 6/6 Swiss electric locomotives. New diesel modernised (post-1999) locomotives are painted in blue livery, while older ones have grey livery.

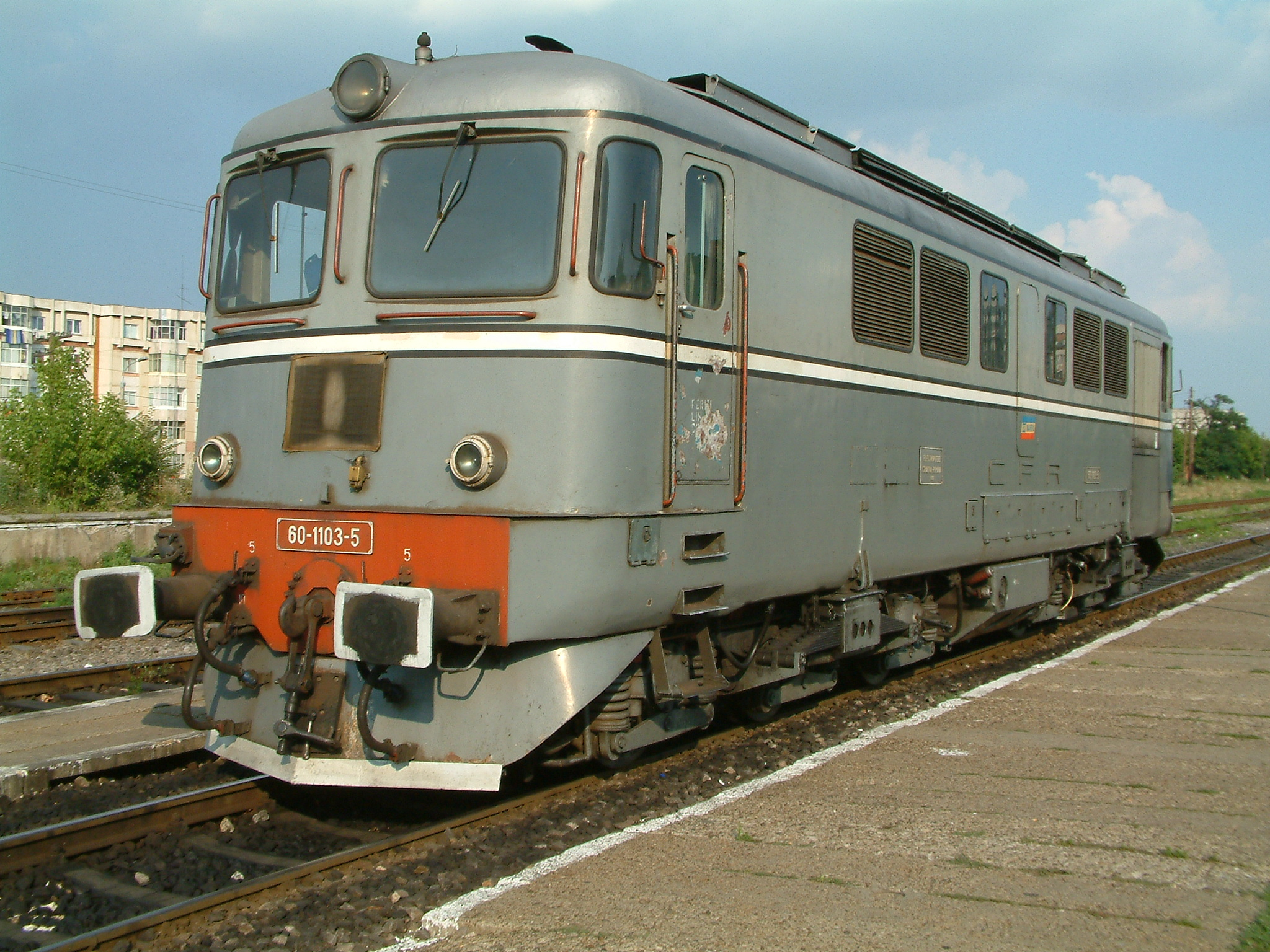
CFR Class 60 Diesel electric locomotive

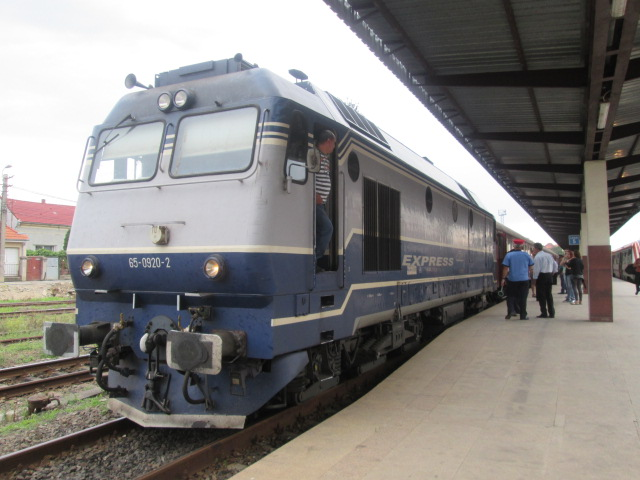
CFR Class 65 Diesel electric locomotive

| Name | Type | Specifications and Notes | Maximum speed | Years built |
|---|---|---|---|---|
| Class 60 (DA) | Diesel electric | 2,100 hp (1,566 kW) Co'Co' axle formula | 100 km/h (62 mph) | 1959–1981 |
| Class 62 (DA–1) | Diesel electric | 2,100 hp (1,566 kW) Co'Co' axle formula | 120 km/h (75 mph) | 1966–1981 |
| Class 63 | Diesel electric | 2,100 hp (1,566 kW) Co'Co' axle formula. Modernised version of class 62 (includes Electrical Train Heating and Electro-Motive Diesel 8 cylinders 2-stroke engine). J. 60 (including Class 65) in service. | 120 km/h (75 mph) | 2000–present |
| Class 65 | Diesel electric | 2,100 hp (1,566 kW) Co'Co' axle formula. Modernised version of class 60 (includes Electrical Train Heating and Electro-Motive Diesel 8 cylinders 2-stroke engine). | 100 km/h (62 mph) | 2004–present |
| Class 66 | Diesel electric | 3,000 hp (2,237 kW) Co'Co' axle formula. ALCO 4-stroke engine, freight version. | 115 km/h (71 mph) | 1978–1982 |
| Class 67 | Diesel electric | 3,000 hp (2,237 kW) Co'Co' axle formula. Passenger version of class 66. | 140 km/h (87 mph) | 1978–1982 |
| Class 68 | Diesel electric | 2,100 hp (1,566 kW) Co'Co' axle formula. Same as class 60, but uses broad gauge (1520 mm) for railways near the Moldovan and Ukrainian borders. | 100 km/h (62 mph) | 1959–1988 |
| Class 70 | Diesel electric | 4,000 hp (2,983 kW) Co'Co' axle formula. ALCO 4-stroke engine, freight version. | 115 km/h (71 mph) | 1978–1982 |
| Class 71 | Diesel electric | 4,000 hp (2,983 kW) Co'Co' axle formula. Passenger version of class 70. | 140 km/h (87 mph) | 1978–1982 |

=== Electric locomotives ===
The electric locomotives employed by Romanian Railways-CFR and built by Electroputere Craiova are known as EA-type and were originally based on the license of the Swedish company ASEA. All are built for standard gauge (1435 mm) and run using a catenary wire at 50 Hz 25 kV AC. Older electric locomotives are painted in grey livery, while modernised (post-1999) rolling stock use red livery.

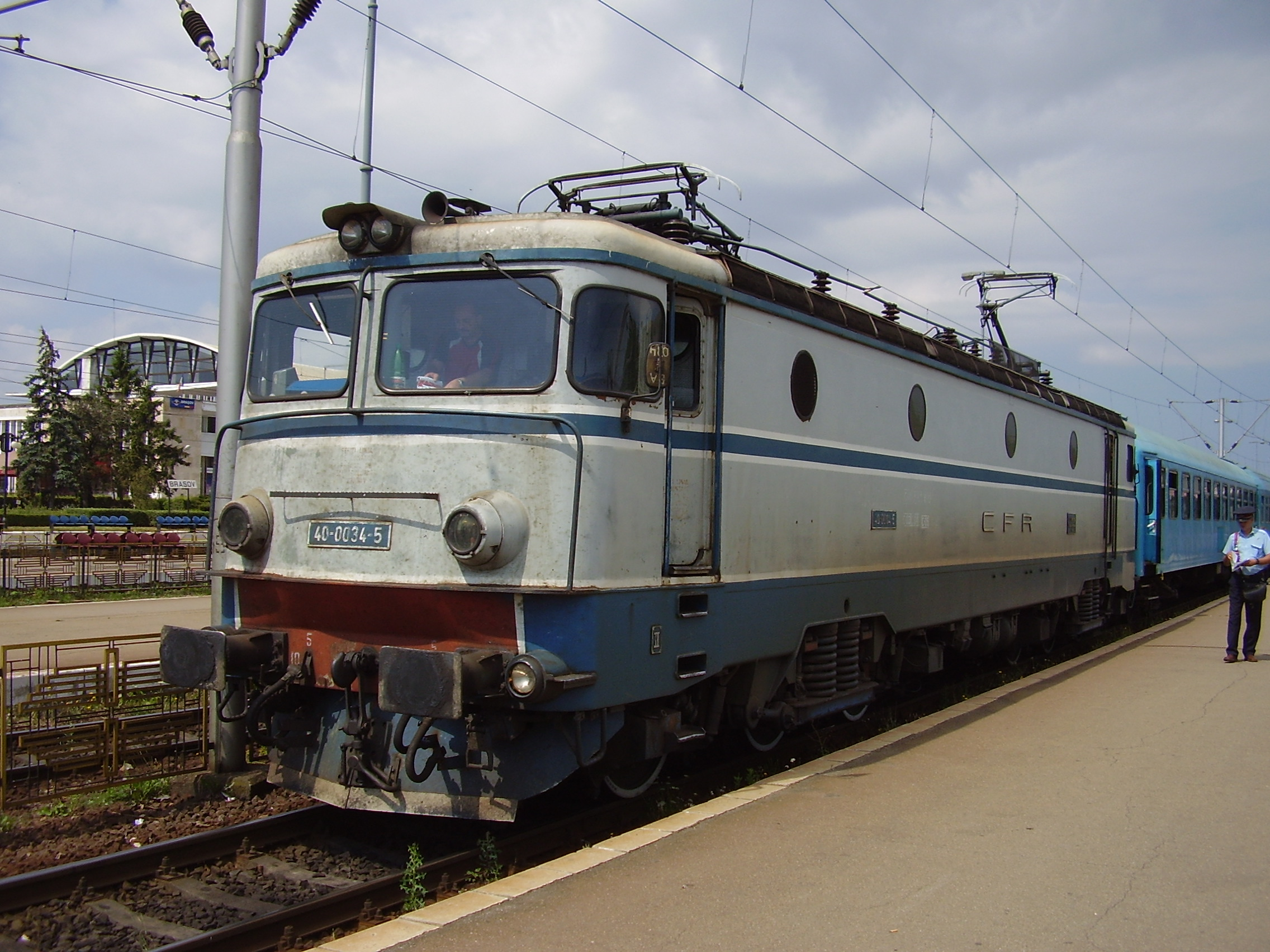
CFR Class 40 Electric locomotive

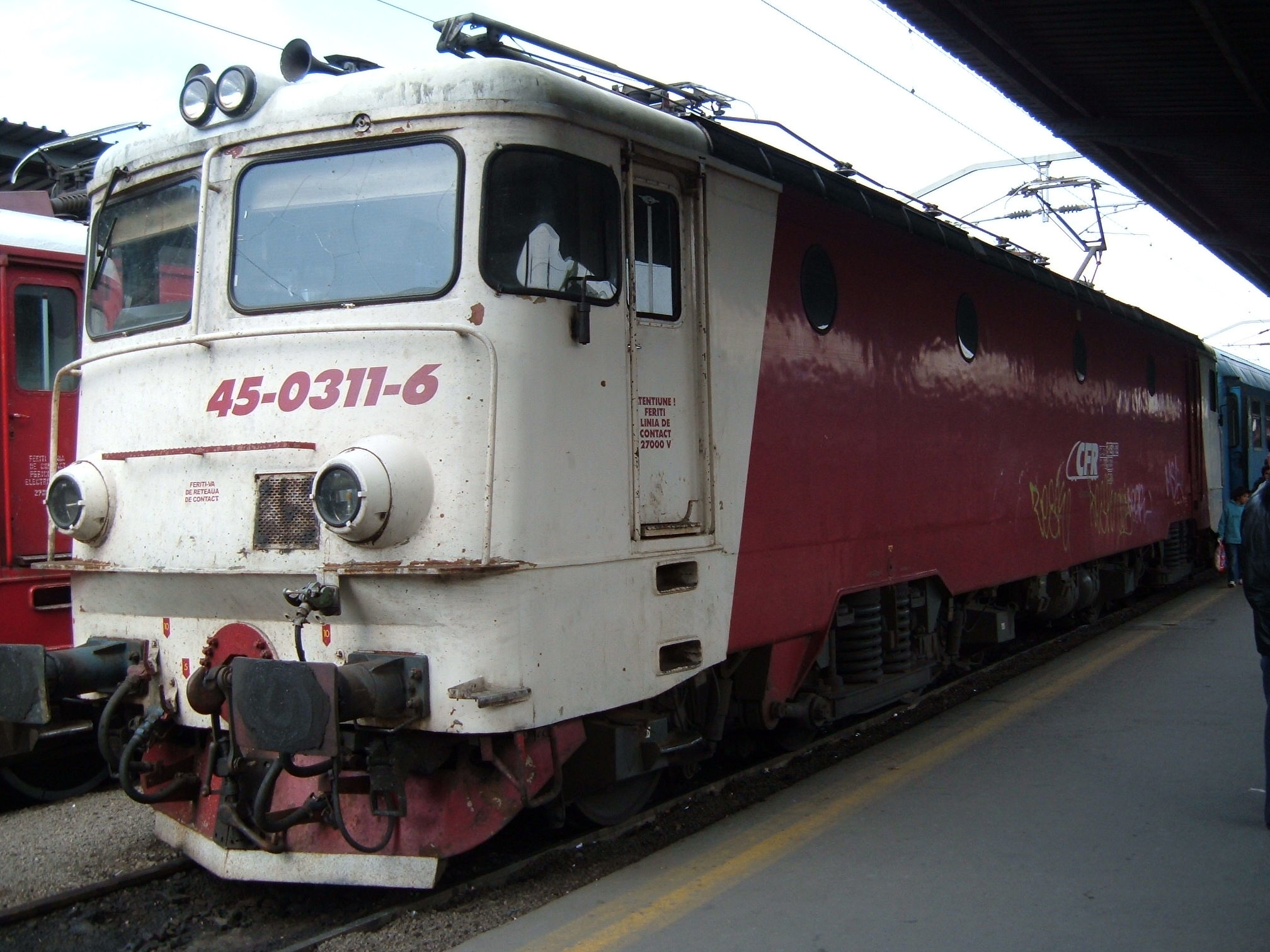
CFR Class 45 Electric locomotive

| Name | Builder | Specifications and Notes | Maximum speed | Years built |
|---|---|---|---|---|
| Class 40 (EA) | Electroputere | 5,100 kW (6,839 hp) Co'Co' axle formula | 120 km/h | 1965–1991 |
| Class 41 (EA–1) | Electroputere | 5,100 kW (6,839 hp) Co'Co' axle formula | 160 km/h | 1966–1991 |
| Class 42 | Electroputere | 5,100 kW (6,839 hp) Co'Co' axle formula. Only 2 were built, modified from existing ones, for speed tests. | 200 km/h | 1977 |
| Class 45 | Electroputere-Siemens Transportation Systems | 5,100 kW (6,839 hp) Co'Co' axle formula. Heavily modernised class 41 locomotives, with new bogies, gears, control systems and brakes. First CFR locomotives to use computerised traction control. 24 are currently in service, with 20 currently being converted from class 41. | 160 km/h | 1999–2000 |
| CFR Class 47 | Electroputere Craiova, Softronic | 6,600 kW (8,851 hp) Co'Co' axle formula, modernized from Class 40 and 41 for heavy loads. Only 1 is owned by CFR Călători; the others belong to freight operators, including CFR Marfă. | 120 (160) km/h | 2006–present |

== For British Rail ==
The 3500 HP Diesel electric locomotive, known as LDE 3500 HP-BR, was manufactured for British Railways. A total of 30 locomotives have been delivered.

| Name | Type | Specifications and Notes | Maximum speed | overall length | maximum width | maximum height | weight, fully supplied |
|---|---|---|---|---|---|---|---|
| LDE 3500 HP-BR | Diesel electric | 3,500 hp (2,610 kW) Co'Co' axle formula | 130 km/h (81 mph) | 19,355 mm (762.0 in) | 2,683 mm (105.6 in) | 3,896 mm (153.4 in) | 128 t (282,000 lb) |

== For Bulgarian Railways ==
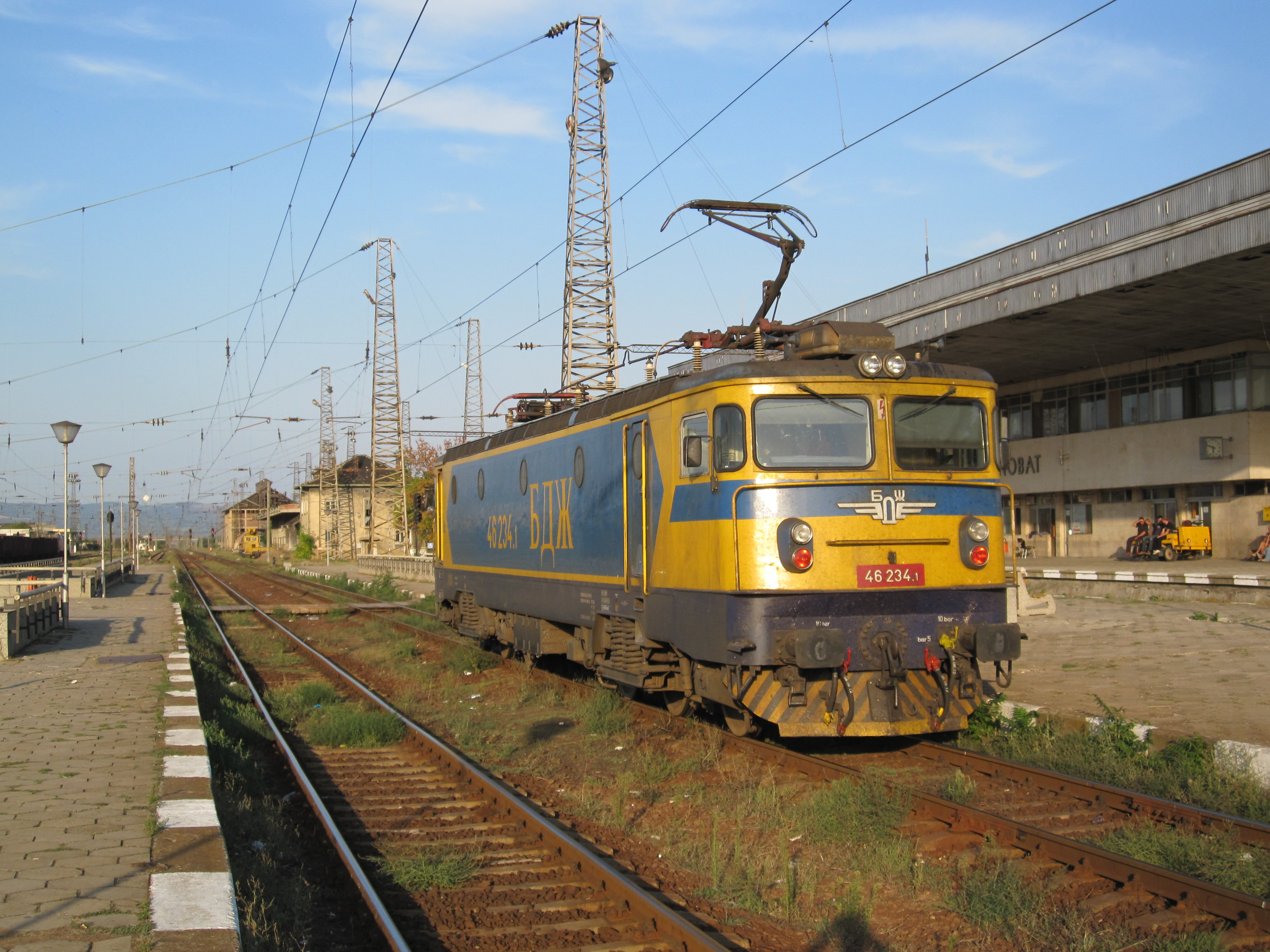
Bulgarian Railways BDŽ Class 46 Electric locomotive

The 2100 HP Diesel electric locomotive, similar to Romanian Class 62, known as BDŽ LDE 2100HP Class 06, was manufactured for Bulgarian Railways. A total of 130 locomotives of this type have been delivered.

| Name | Type | Specifications and Notes | Maximum speed | overall length | maximum width | maximum height | weight, fully supplied |
|---|---|---|---|---|---|---|---|
| LDE 2100HP BDZ | Diesel electric | 2,100 hp (1,566 kW) Co'Co' axle formula | 120 km/h (75 mph) | 17,000 mm (670 in) | 3,000 mm (120 in) | 4,435 mm (174.6 in) | 117 t (258,000 lb) |

The BDŽ Class 46 Electric Locomotive of 5100 kW for Bulgarian Railways, and similar to Romanian Class 40, was manufactured as a more improved alternative against EL 5100 kW for Romanian Railways. A total of 45 locomotives of this type have been delivered.

| Name | Type | Specifications and Notes | Maximum speed | overall length | maximum width | height with lowered pantograph | height with lifted pantograph | weight, with ballast |
|---|---|---|---|---|---|---|---|---|
| LE 5100 kW-BDŽ Class 46 | Electric | 5,100 kW (6,839 hp) Co'Co' axle formula | 150 km/h (93 mph) | 19,800 mm (780 in) | 3,000 mm (120 in) | 4,620 mm (182 in) | 4,900 mm (190 in) to 6,700 mm (260 in) | 126 t (278,000 lb) |

== For China Railways ==
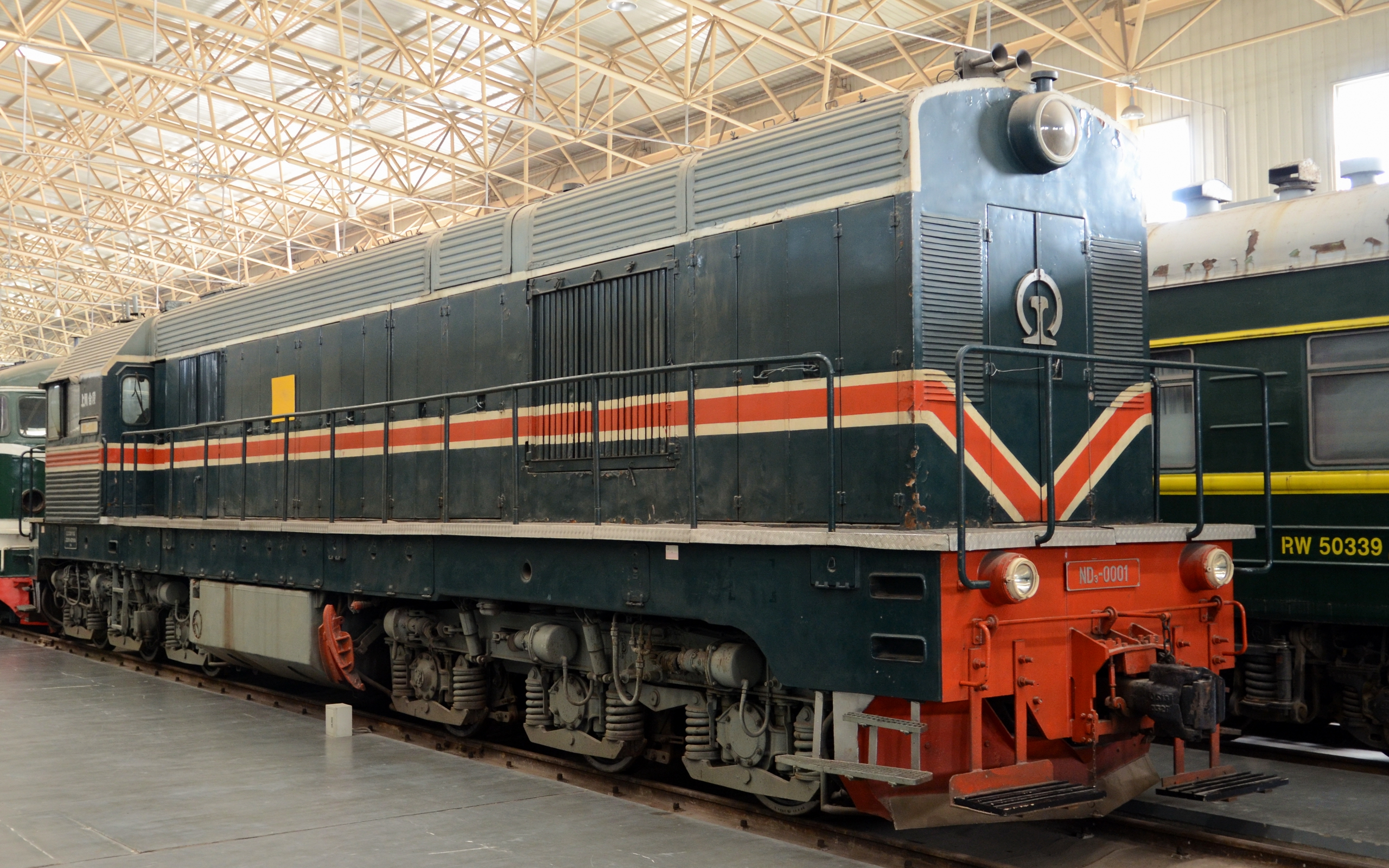
China Railways ND3 Diesel electric locomotive

The 2100 HP Diesel electric locomotive, similar to Romanian Class 62, known as LDE 2100HP ND2, was manufactured for China Railway. A total of 285 locomotives have been delivered.

With a different body, another model of diesel electric locomotives, known as LDE 2100 HP-ND3, was employed by China Railway. A total of 88 locomotives of this type have been delivered.

| Name | Type | Specifications and Notes | Maximum speed | overall length | maximum width | maximum height | weight, fully supplied |
|---|---|---|---|---|---|---|---|
| LDE 2100 HP-ND3 | Diesel electric | 2,100 hp (1,566 kW) Co'Co' axle formula | 100 km/h (62 mph) | 18,340 mm (722 in) | 3,270 mm (129 in) | 4,570 mm (180 in) | 126 t (278,000 lb) |

The Electric Locomotive of 5100 kW was also manufactured for China Railways. They were known as RS1, and only 2 locomotives have been delivered.

== For Hellenic Railways ==
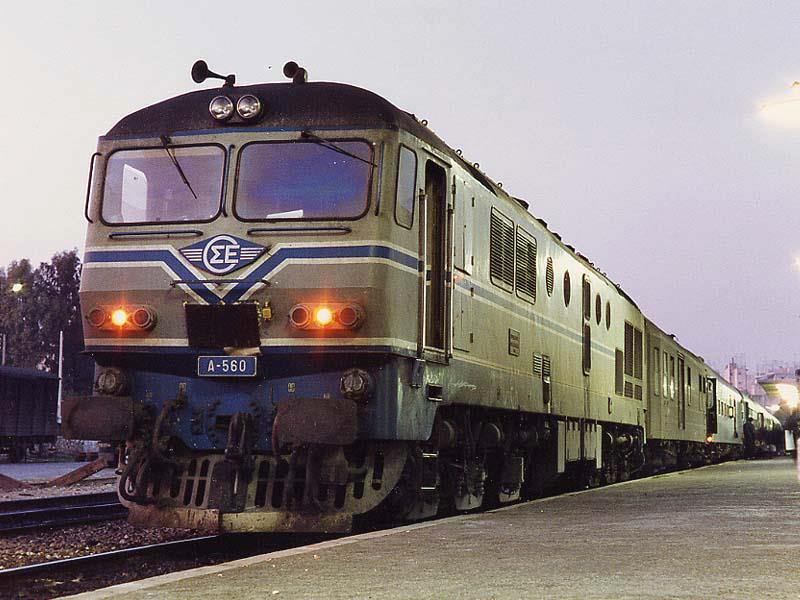
Hellenic Railways LDE 4000 Diesel electric locomotive

The diesel electric locomotives employed by Hellenic Railways are known as LDE 4000 HP-OSE. A total of 10 locomotives have been delivered.

| Name | Type | Specifications and Notes | Maximum speed | overall length | maximum width | maximum height | weight, fully supplied |
|---|---|---|---|---|---|---|---|
| LDE 4000 HP-OSE | Diesel electric | 3,955 hp (2,949 kW) Co'Co' axle formula | 145 km/h (90 mph) | 20,200 mm (800 in) | 3,100 mm (120 in) | 4,438 mm (174.7 in) | 123 t (271,000 lb) |

== For Iranian Railways ==
The diesel electric locomotives employed by Iranian Railways are known as LDE 2640 HP-IR. A total of 20 locomotives have been delivered.

| Name | Type | Specifications and Notes | Maximum speed | overall length | maximum width | maximum height | weight, with 2/3 fuel, lube oil and sand |
|---|---|---|---|---|---|---|---|
| LDE 2640 HP-IR | Diesel electric | 2,640 hp (1,969 kW) Co'Co' axle formula | 100 km/h (62 mph) | 19,270 mm (759 in) | 2,940 mm (116 in) | 4,300 mm (170 in) | 120 t (260,000 lb) |

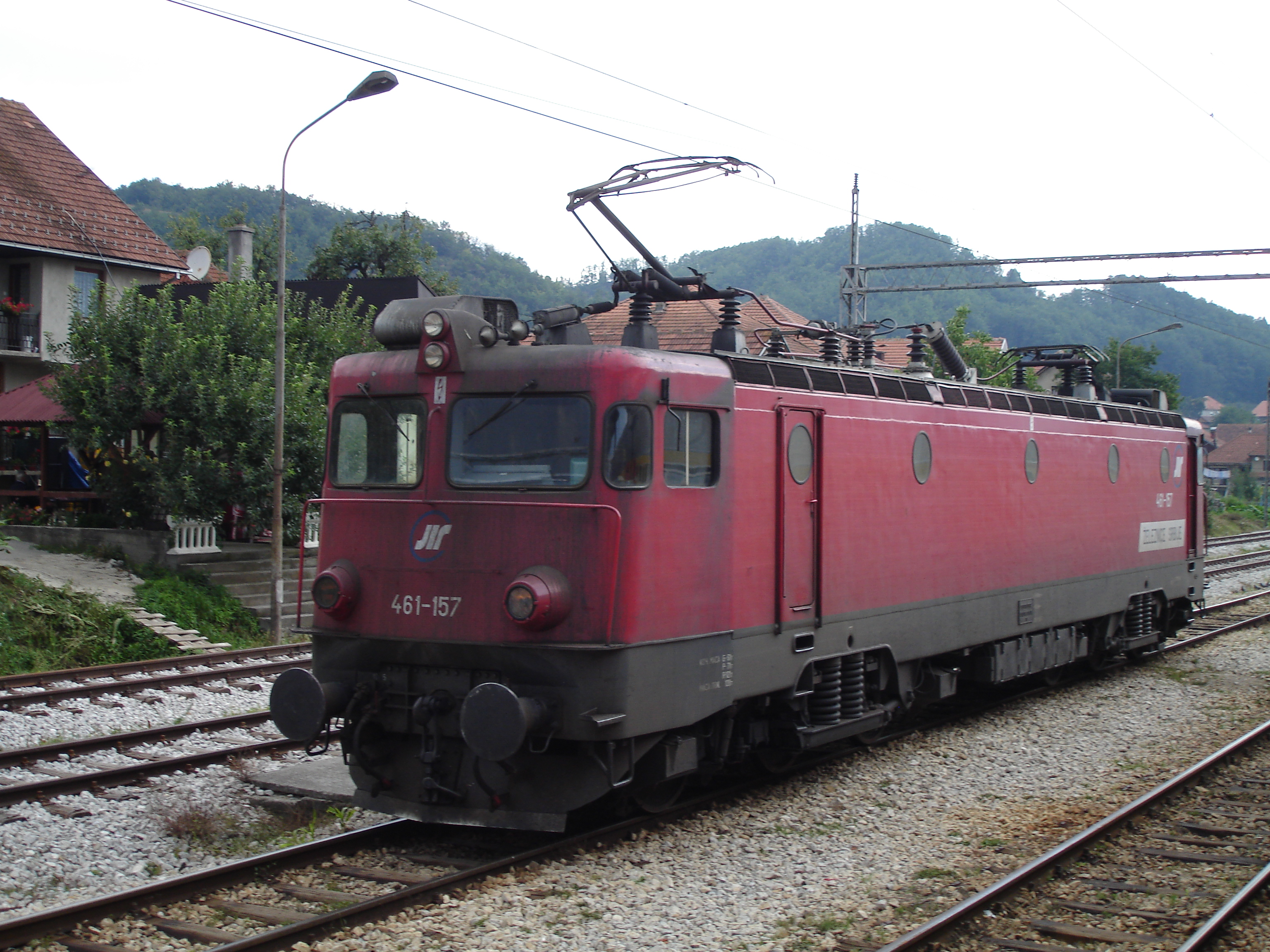
Serbian Railways ŽS Class 461 Electric locomotive

== For Polish State Railways ==
The 2100 HP Diesel electric locomotive, similar to Romanian Class 62, known as LDE 2100HP PKP, was manufactured for Polish State Railways. A total of 422 locomotives have been delivered.

== For Yugoslav Railways ==
The Electric Locomotive of 5100 kW was also manufactured for Yugoslav Railways. Known as Class 461, nowadays they are in use for Serbian Railways and Railways of Montenegro. A total of 103 locomotives have been delivered.

== See also ==
- List of stock used by Romanian Railways
