= Electroputere LE5100 =

Romanian electric locomotive

Electroputere LE 5100kW CFR 060-EA/EA1/EA2 (pre-1980) CFR Clasa 40/41/42 (post-1980)
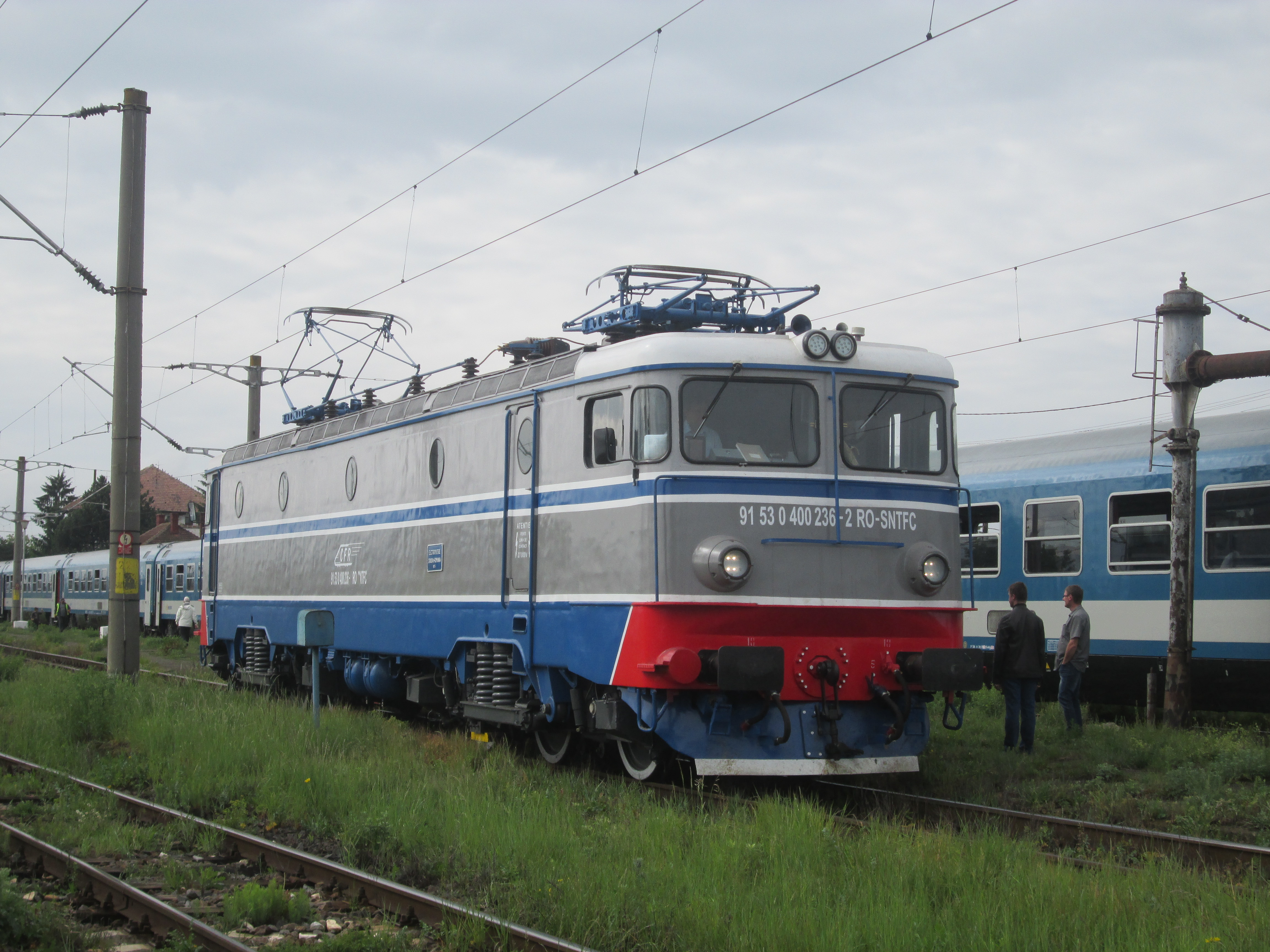
- CFR 400 236, spotting the historic livery, seen at Siculeni-Ciceu railway station, getting ready to pull the "Székely Gyorsvonat" towards Ghimeș, 20 May 2018
Type and origin
- Power type: Electric
- Builder: Swedloc AB (ASEA, NOHAB); Electroputere Craiova
- Build date: 1965-1966 ASEA; 1967-1991 EP
- Total produced: Class 40-41: 1076; Class 42: 1
Specifications
- Configuration
  - AAR: C-C
  - UIC: Co′Co′
- Gauge: 1,435 mm (4 ft 8 1/2 in)
- Driver dia.: 1,250 mm (4.1 ft)
- Wheelbase: Rigid: 4,350 mm (14.27 ft); Overall: 10,300 mm (33.79 ft)
- Length: 19,800 mm (64.96 ft)
- Width: 3,000 mm (9.84 ft)
- Height: 4,500 mm (14.76 ft)
- Axle load: 20 t (44,092.45 lb)
- Loco weight: 120 t (264,554.7 pounds)
- Electric system/s: 19.5-27.5 kV 50 Hz AC Catenary
- Current pickup: Overhead AC with symmetric/asymmetric dual pantographs
- Traction motors: 6× 850 kW (1,140 hp)
Performance figures
- Maximum speed: 120 km/h (75 mph) Class 40; 160 km/h (99 mph) Class 41; 200 km/h (120 mph) Class 42
- Power output: 5,100 kW (6,800 hp)
- Tractive effort: 412 kN (93,000 lbf); 392 kN (88,000 lbf)
Career
- Operators: CFR, CFR Marfă, GFR, Servtrans, UNICOM, TFG,
- Locale: Romania, Hungary, Slovakia, Serbia, Croatia, Montenegro, North Macedonia, Bulgaria
- First run: 9 December 1965

The Electroputere LE 5100, otherwise known as CFR Class 40/41/42, is a family of electric locomotives (separated by 3 classes) built for the Romanian Railways (CFR) for use on the Romanian electrified network. Over 1000 Class 40s were constructed, based on the SJ Rb, by Electroputere (EP) under ASEA license in EPs Craiova Works from 1967 to 1991.

Entering service in 1965, the Class 40 also operated on private railroads after the repeal of CFRs monopoly on rail transport. The vast majority of all the engines are still in service, as of 2020, having become an icon for the Romanian Railways.

== History ==
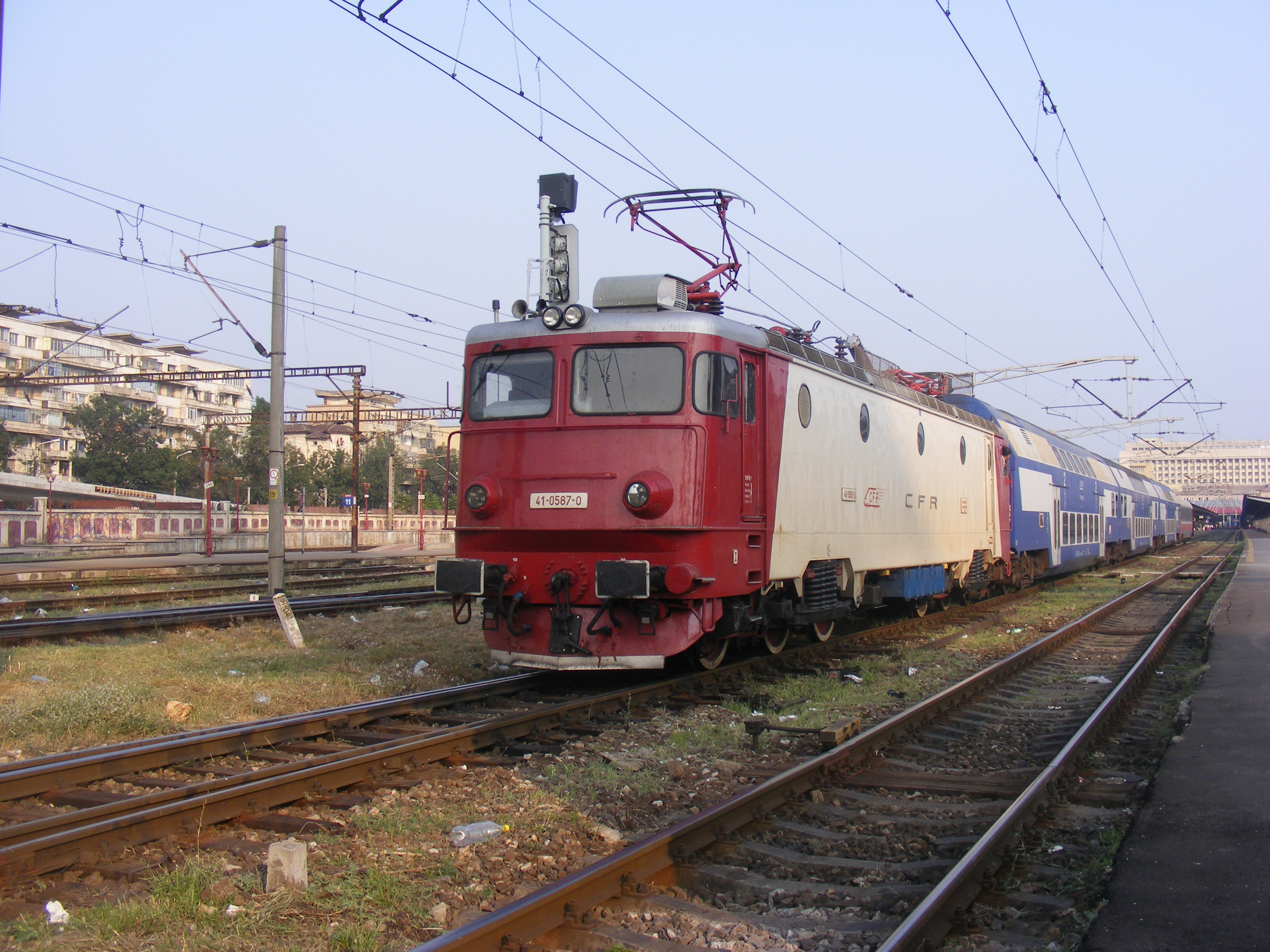
CFR Class 41-0587-0 reversing in Gara de Nord, with the new livery

Following the plans of the Communist Party, the Romanian railway network was to reduce its operating steam engines to under 25% of the total number of engines. Since the start of dieselisation in Romania, communist ambitions were to improve local industrial capacities, remove dependency on outside sources and reduce conventional fuel consumption. Even if the country has previously signed partnerships with Sulzer for the development of its diesel-electric locomotives, for the electric locomotive trials were made on the Predeal-Brașov sector between 1963 and 1965. The locomotives used were:

- 2 locomotives of SNCF Class BB 12000, made by Alstom
- 1 locomotive made by LEW Hennigsdorf, the predecessor of the DR Class E 251
- 2 locomotives made by Škoda Works, type 41E. This locomotive would become the backbone of the Bulgarian Railways in 1963.
- 2 locomotives made by ASEA, type Rb. These would also go to Yugoslavia in 1967 to be the basis of JZ class 441

=== Builders ===
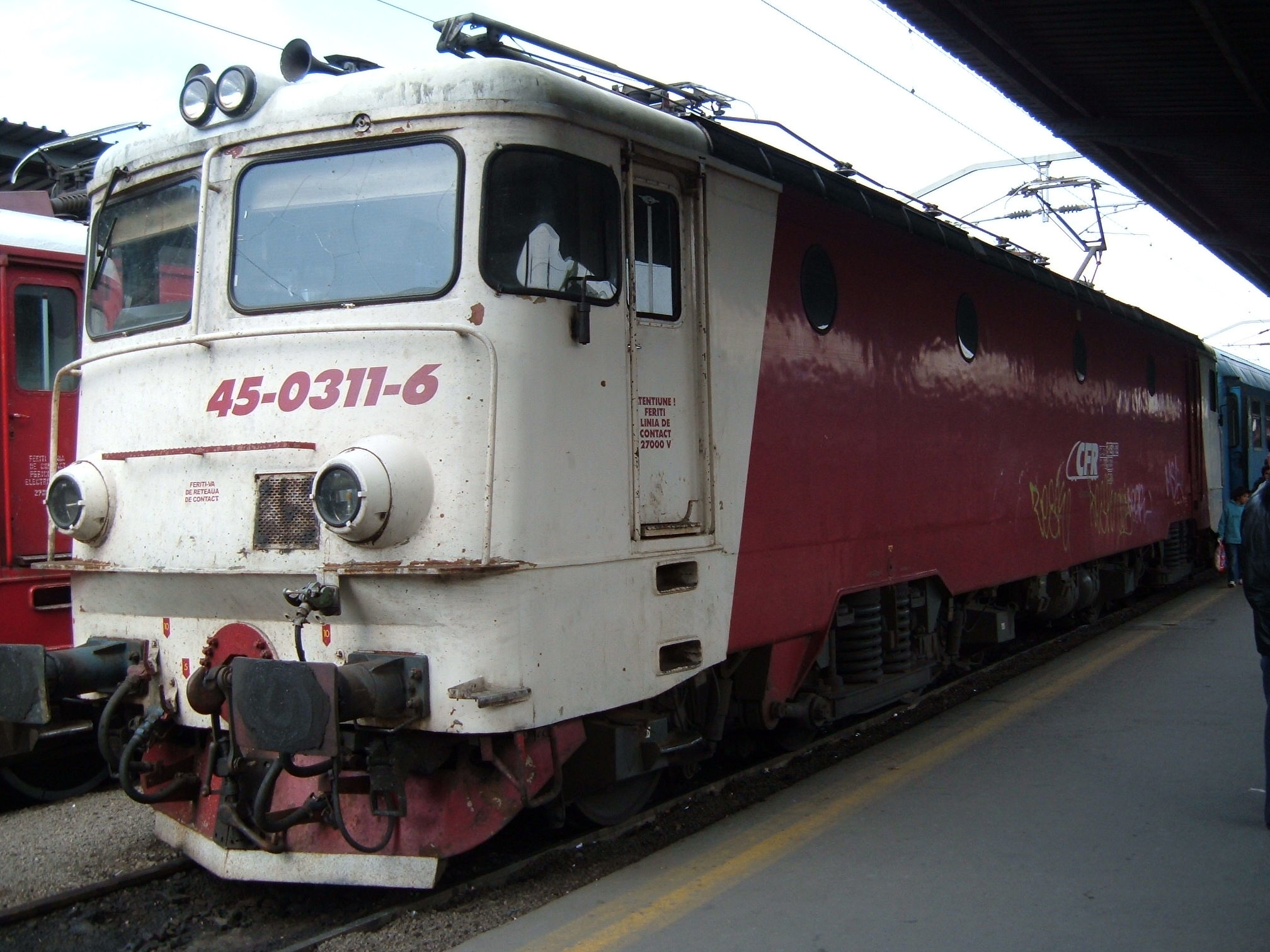
CFR Class 45

==== Allmänna Svenska Elektriska AB ====
10 locomotives were made by ASEA after an agreement was reached in 1965. The locomotives were numbered from 060-EA-001 to 060-EA-009. Another unit, 060-EB-001 fitted with experimental electrical equipment (regenerative braking and thyristors) was delivered, though it was proven to be faulty and expensive to maintain and rarely used until 1991, when it was rebuilt into a regular 40 class unit. The 10 units were basically a SJ Rb but with heavy modifications (longer wheelbase, 6 axles), that were made until 1966. Out of all the 10 units that were delivered, only a few survive up to this day, 060-EA-001 being destroyed in an accident at Augustin in 1990, whilst a number of them have been renumbered/refurbished. At the time of their introduction, they were the second strongest class of electric locomotives in Europe, only being overtaken at this performance by the DB Class 103 in West Germany.

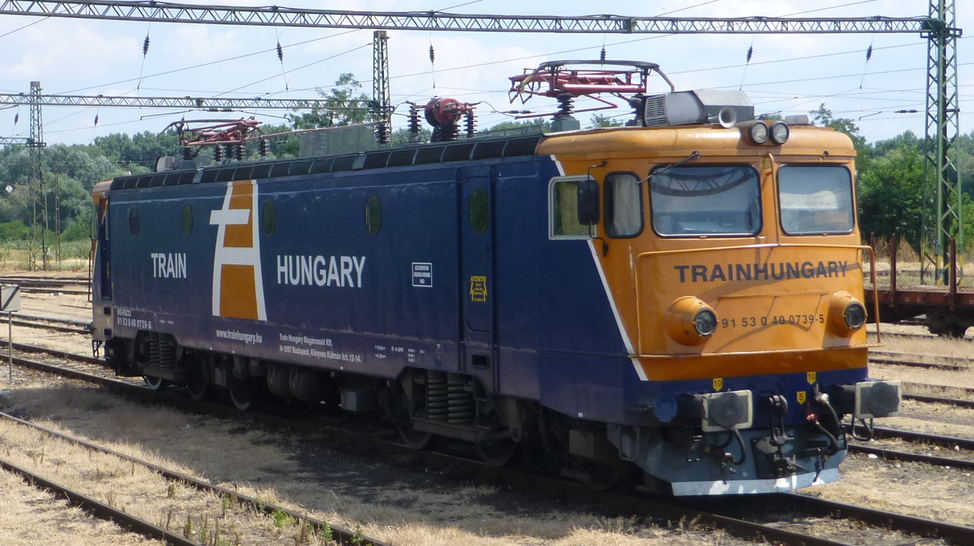
Train Hungary Class 400

==== Electroputere Craiova ====
After 1966, all the engines were built by the Electroputere Craiova factory and have been identified by the EA designation. These are all 6 axle, 5100 kW engines, produced in a number of over 1000 units between 1967 and 1991. Electroputere (EP) manufactured both the mechanics and electronics of the engines, after mechanics for the engines stopped to be manufactured in Reșița, EP took care of the entire manufacturing for these engines and had a yearly output of 150 engines per year. The differences between EA class and EA1 class (classes 40 respectively 41 under the new classification) is that class EA is designed for regular passenger trains and freight trains, being limited to 120 km/h whilst the class EA1 is designed for higher speed fast trains with a maximum speed of 160 km/h.

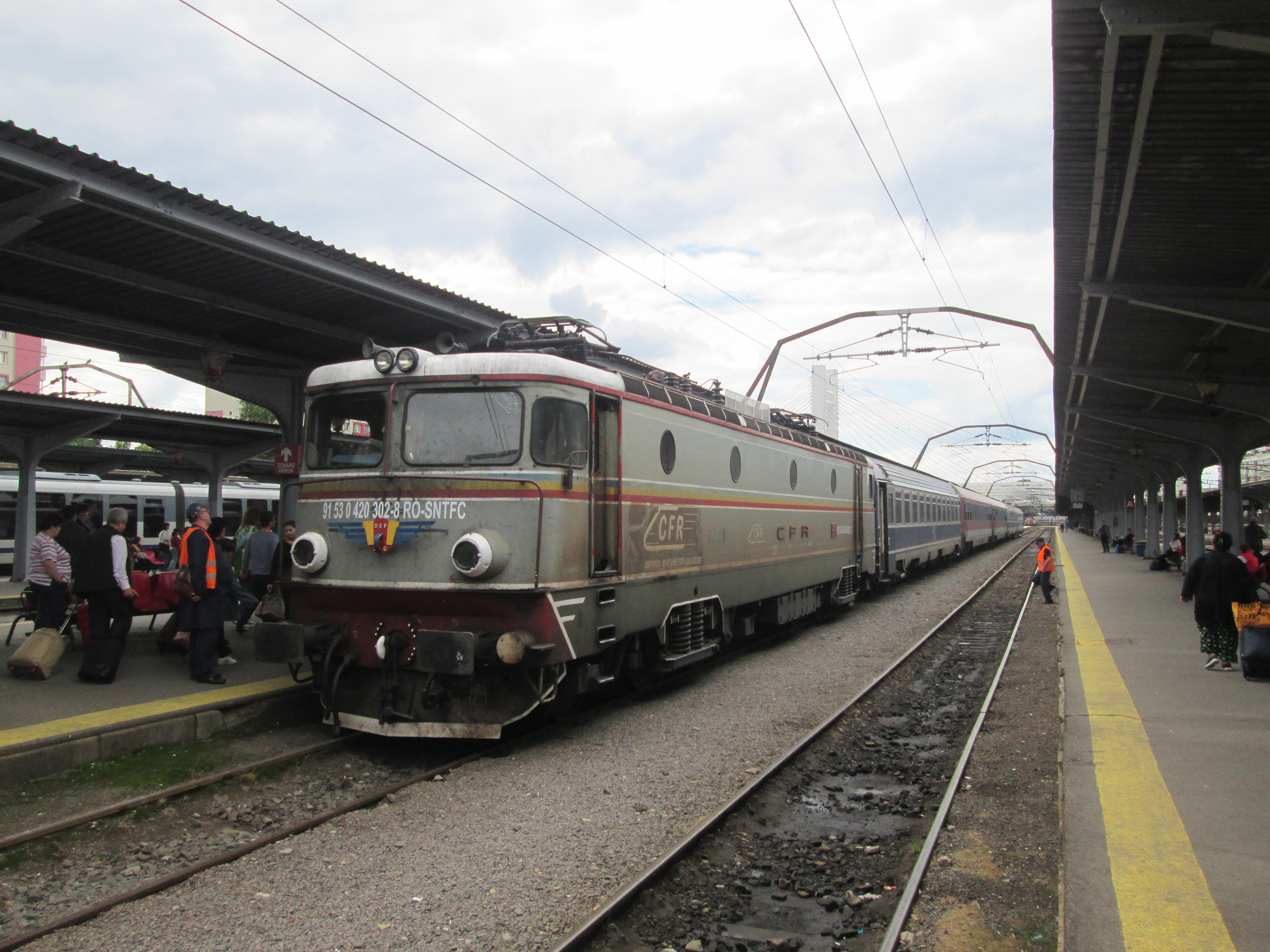
The only Class 42 ever built at Gara de Nord. It holds the speed record in Romania (227 km/h in 1997, on Florești Prahova - Buda line). Until recently it was capable of speeds up to 200 km/H, but because one of the bearings is worn out, it can only achieve speeds of ~160 km/h

In 1974, 060-EA1-122 (later 41-0122-6) was built using experimental 200 km/h axles and gear ratios and used as a test locomotive under the classification of EA2 (thus becoming 060-EA2-122, nicknamed "The General" due to this high ranking status). After the experiments proved successful, the axles and gear ratios were transferred to 060-EA2-302 (later 42-0302-2, now 420 302 under the UIC classification) in 1977 and 122 was soon converted into an EA1 machine using 160 km/h axles and gear ratios. 302 soon became the new "general", breaking the speed records for Romanian Railways twice, once in 1997 during testing of the Eurofima-based passenger cars on the Florești Prahova-Buda stretch of the Ploiești-Brașov mainline, and the second time in 2007 on the Făurei ring during testing for Astra Arad passenger cars. In recent years it has been neglected and due to this, one of the bearings is damaged, resulting into the limitation of the speed to 160 km/h.

The design proved to be very successful, and after an agreement in 1970, Yugoslav Railways decided to buy a number of locomotives that became the JŽ Series 461 from Electroputere, after CFR also agreed to buy Rade Koncar made locomotives. They were first delivered between 1971 and 1973, and they became so successful, that JŽ brought a second batch between 1978 and 1980. After the breakup of Yugoslavia, they were passed onto ŽS, ŽCG and MŽ. A number have been modernised, having been turned into 461.2 series (Serbia) and 462 series (North Macedonia). Further exports were achieved in 1986 and 1987 when the Bulgarian State Railways brought another number of units, that were also modernized, becoming the 46.2 series (the original series number being 40). Modernization of these locomotives is done by KONČAR Group, REMARUL 16 Februarie and RELOC Craiova.

Modernisations for the Romanian Railways' locomotives have been done by different companies, and the first of such concepts appeared in the late 1990s when Siemens (along with a few subcontractors) modernised a few units to CFR Class 45. The modernisations were a success and the locomotives were hailed as "Romania's first modern electric locomotives", produced between 1998 and 2002. Production was stopped though, and only a small number were made, all locomotives numbers beginning with 3xx. They were later rebuilt by Softronic Craiova, and up to this date only 1 unrefurbished locomotive (45-0318-1) runs in regular service, seen mostly on Bucharest-Constanța mainline. Starting with 2006 and 2007, a number of locomotives were rebuilt by Softronic and PROMAT as CFR Class 47, being a more successful modernisation. Refurbishments are done by SCRL Brașov, RELOC, INDA and Softronic Craiova, REMAR Pașcani and Cluj and PROMAT. From 2020 onwards, RELOC Craiova will begin to modernize more members of the classes, after SOFTRONIC quit modernizing locomotives into Class 47s in 2016.

Aside from the exported models to ŽS and BDŽ, these locomotives operate in Hungary and Slovakia. A number of examples are operated by Magyar Magánvasút Zrt., Train Hungary, Prvá Slovenská železničná (rental from CFR Marfă 2012 - 2015), Foxrail and Floyd Zrt, and are used in regular service in those countries. In 1998, OSE (Greek Railways) hired locomotive 060-EA-056 (manufactured 1968) to operate during the opening of the first electrified Greek railway line from Thessaloniki to Idomeni/Gevgelija, and was temporarily used until it was returned to CFR.

=== China Railways 6G1 ===
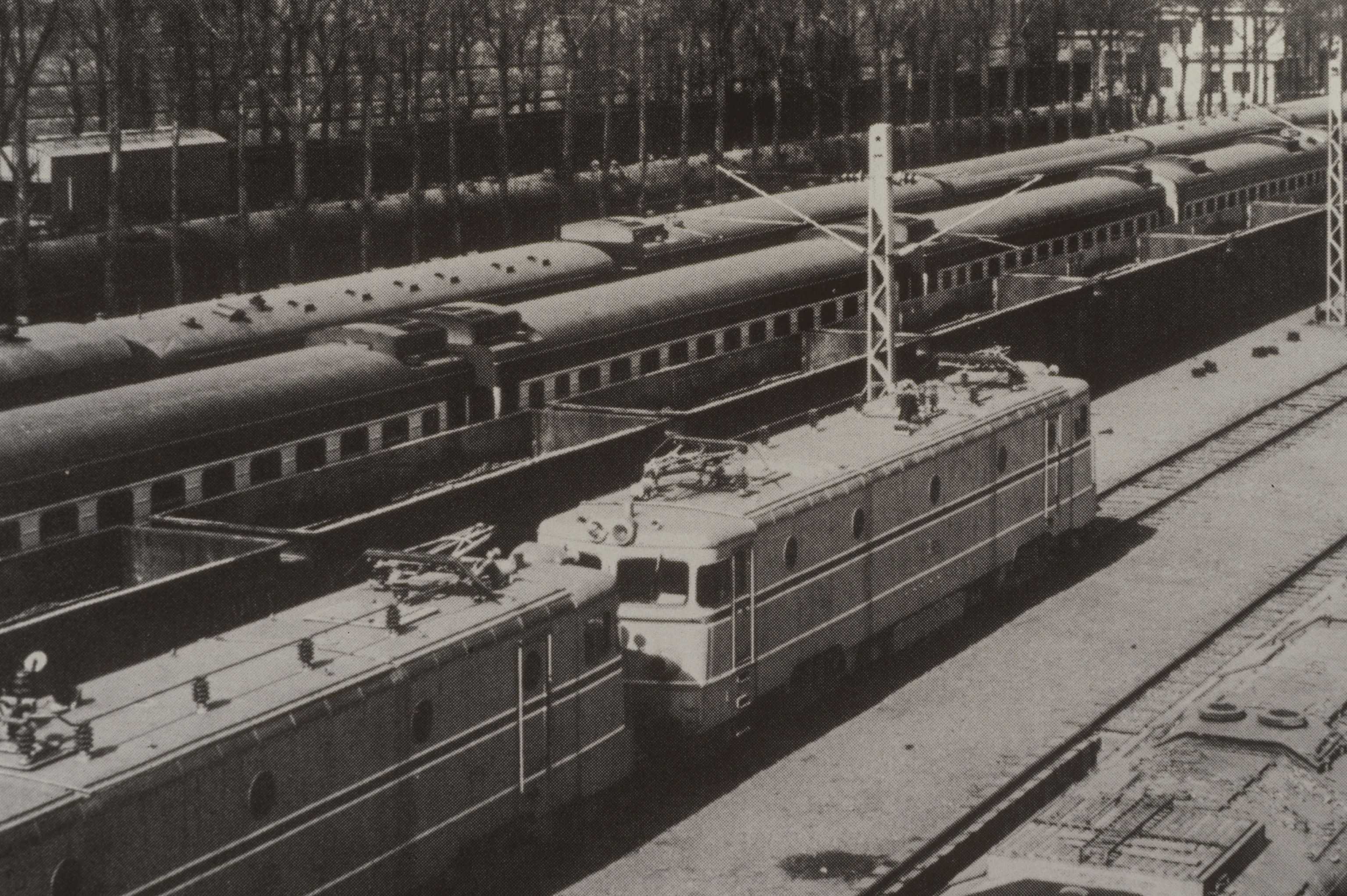
China Railways 6G1 at National Railway Test Center, Beijing

In 1973, in parallel with the delivery of the ND2 locomotives, Electroputere delivered two LE 5100 locomotives to the Ministry of Railways of the People's Republic of China, which allocated them to the Baoji Depot of the Baocheng Railway of the Xi'an Railway Bureau, which also housed 6Y2 and 6G locomotives made by Alsthom. The two units were ordered on an experimental basis but no further orders resulted from the delivery of the two examples, and the employees of the Baocheng Railway found it difficult to maintain them considering that there were not many spare parts, so they often sat in storage. In the 1980s they were given to the Beijing Railway Academy to prepare drivers for shunting duties, but once again incompatibility issues with the academy's testing grounds meant that the locomotive went into storage again. A final attempt was to use them as testbeds for an experimental traction system, but this also did not occur and the two units were scrapped in the early 1990s.

== Technical details ==
The locomotive is known for its simplicity in operating - in the cab, original versions have a dashboard with a panel for gauges and switches, a throttle/dynamic brake wheel and brake levers, along with a knob for the horn, which has low/high and soft/hard tones and Hasler Bern speedometers (mostly replaced by Softronic IVMS speedometers). Subsequently upgraded versions changed that, with the ICOL cabs featuring a throttle/dynamic brake lever, the dashboard is higher and features an on-board computer, and 2 buttons that remove the horn's ability to use the soft/hard tonnes. Certain modernizations (such as by PROMAT but in lower numbers) maintain the "wheel" but have a renovated dashboard, somewhat similar to the CFR Class 46.

Inside the machines' hall, electric current enters into the oil-cooled transformer, where it is converted from 25 kV AC to 1.5 kV, passing through silicon diode rectifiers where it is converted into DC current for the ASEA LJE 108 traction motors. There are also 3 ventilation groups that activate after 5 seconds each; the locomotive can start without the ventilators turned on, but only for shunting. Not using the ventilation on higher traction currents will lead to damage to the traction motors. The traction motors weigh 3,7 tonnes, and with all of them running properly, produce up to 5400 kW of hourly power, and 5100 kW continuous power.

Electric current is obtained with the help of 2 pantographs and the main switch, type IAC-25. Early models until the mid-1970s had ASEA LLXJN 135 (with one skid plate for 120 km/h of maximum speed and with two skid plates for 160 km/h of maximum speed), but beginning with 1975, locomotives began to be delivered with Faiveley EP1 pantographs, which became a standard factory option from the late 1970s onwards. From the 1990s onwards, Faiveley EP2 and EP3 pantographs became more common, while certain modernized examples (and for a brief period of time in the late 1990s for EA2 302) use Schunk WBLs, with some examples using Stemmann Technik DSA150s and Schunk WBL-Z (single arm) pantographs. EA1 292 was fitted with experimental Faiveley AX pantographs (typically fitted on SNCF Astride locomotives) between 1997 and 1998, in order to test them for the upcoming Class 45 modernization program.

The throttle and dynamic brake controller operates in a similar way to the BR Class 86 tap charger mechanism, with 40 throttle steps (including the 3 initial shunting positions), plus 3 weakfield positions, all displayed on a gauge. Dynamic braking is controlled in the same way as the throttle is, being activated by moving the wheel rightwards (as opposed to leftwards for throttle), with a limit of ~960A for its operation. All locomotives are fitted with standard dynamic braking, but between 1966 and 1991, one unit was fitted experimentally with regenerative braking, however it was very uneconomical to operate, not to mention dangerous for the locomotive and the catenary. The unit, EB 001, was rebuilt and renumbered into EA 931.

The air brakes fitted on these locomotives are Knorr KD2 (train) and Oerlikon FD1 (locomotive). For Yugoslavia, the train brake was also manufactured by Oerlikon, not to mention the fact that the cab is placed on the left instead of the right side, as at the time the Yugoslavian Railways ordered its electric locomotives with the driving position on the right.

=== Notable units ===
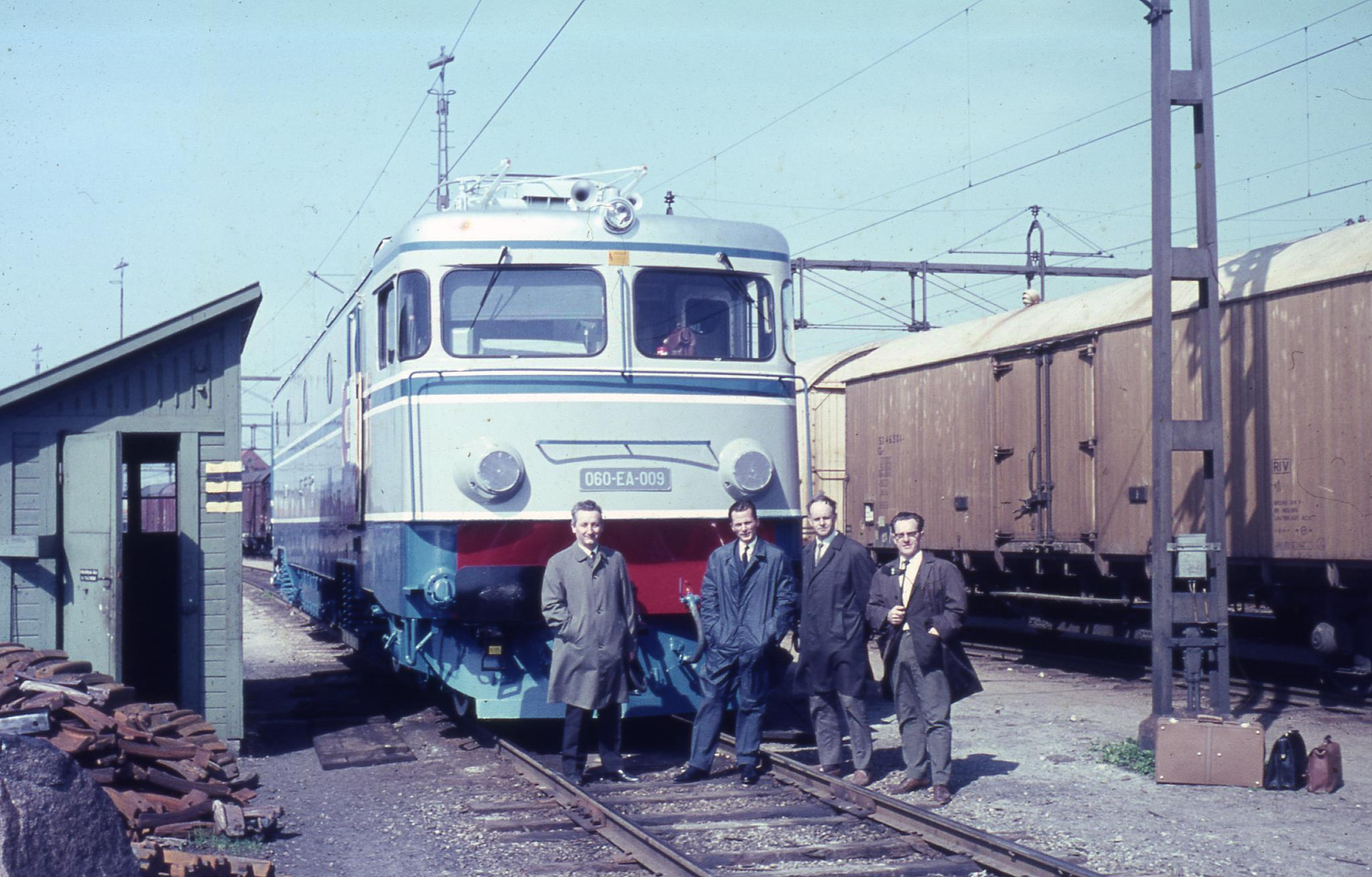
060-EA-009 at Trelleborg in Sweden awaiting to be loaded onto the railway ferry to Sassnitz during its delivery to the Brașov depot, 1966

During the 1980s and 1990s, multiple locomotives became easily recognizable due to their liveries, which was in part, due to the drivers of these locomotives customizing them within the cab and outside. As such, it was common to see locomotives using window curtains, tricolor-painted stripes and various shades of the colors used by CFR at the time. Eventually this "tradition" died out when multiple locomotives were refurbished or scrapped, but some train drivers continued it in the 2000s and 2010s, including on modernized Class 47s. Certain locomotives also gained various nicknames, instead of a common nickname for the whole class.

- EA 079 was made by Electroputere in 1979, and in the late 1990s it was refurbished by the same company in order to operate at 15 kV AC, for German railway operator Karsdorfer Eisenbahngesellschaft (this same operator purchased second-hand locomotives from Romania and the former East Germany). With its bankruptcy, it was stored for years in Germany, until ABB refurbished the locomotive in the mid 2010s in Sweden, looking for potential customers. It eventually entered ownership of VTR(Vest Trans Rail) after a year, being converted back to 25 kV AC operation.
- EA1 122 was made by Electroputere in 1974, and painted in a livery that featured an orange stripe instead of the standard red/blue stripe, and it also featured tricolor curtains in the cab. After modernization, the dashboard paneling was painted green, but the locomotive's livery became the standard white with red front ends.
- EA 127 was made by Electroputere in 1976, and in the 1990s it was painted in a blue and grey livery, similar to the ones fitted on DA diesel locomotives when they arrived from Switzerland in 1959. It was scrapped in 2002 at Ciceu.
- EA 236 was made by Electroputere in 1975, and is one of the few locomotives to still retain its original livery and pantographs, having been refurbished in April 2018 by SCRL Brașov to its almost/original condition.
- EA1 242 was operated by the Brașov train depot, and in the 2000s and early 2010s it was well taken care of by its driver.
- EA 247 was one of the last "classical" locomotives with a tricolor stripe and original Hasler speedometer, in 2013 it was modernized into a Class 47.
- EA 721 was made by Electroputere in 1984, and is one of the only 3 locomotives that was built with corrugated side walls (somewhat resembling the DR Class 243), and the only one still operating as of today.
- EA 801 was nicknamed "Dolly" by the drivers where it was stabled at, and in 1996 it spotted a livery similar to the DA diesels that operated at the time, but with a "reversed" stripe (painted in white) and had a white dashboard as well.
