= CFR Class 47 =

Class of electric locomotives

CFR Clasa 47 (LE 5100kW)
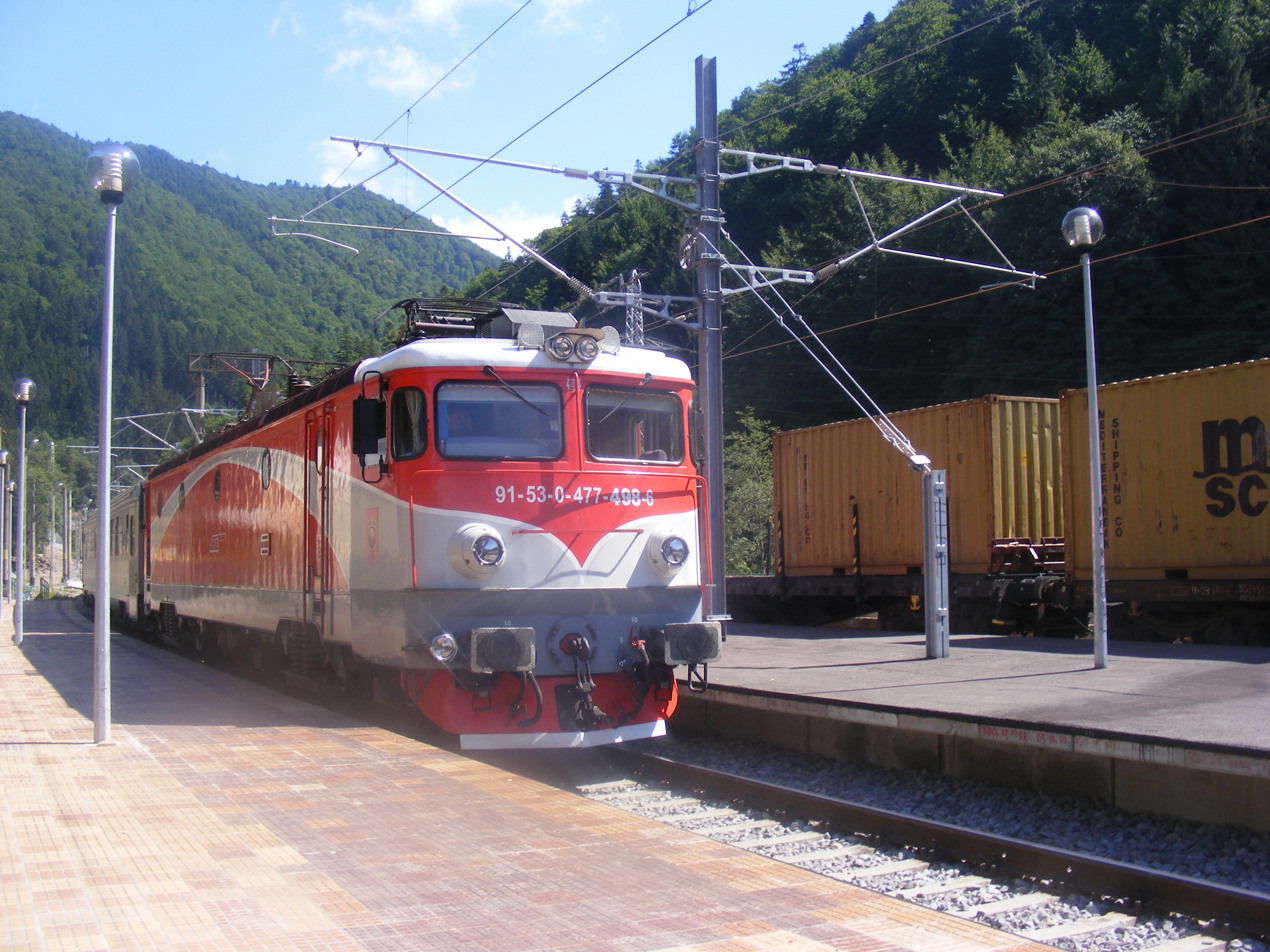
- CFR 477 498 at Sinaia station, 13 August 2011
Type and origin
- Power type: Electric
- Builder: Softronic Craiova, PROMAT (474 freight locomotives only)
- Build date: 2006 - Present (1965-1991 original build dates)
- Total produced: 176
Specifications
- Configuration
  - UIC: Co′Co′
- Gauge: 1,435 mm (4 ft 8 1/2 in)
- Driver dia.: 1,250 mm (4.1 ft)
- Wheelbase: Rigid: 4,350 mm (14.27 ft); Overall: 10,300 mm (33.79 ft)
- Length: 19,800 mm (64.96 ft)
- Width: 3,000 mm (9.84 ft)
- Height: 4,500 mm (14.76 ft)
- Axle load: 20 t (44,092.45 lb)
- Loco weight: 120 t (264,554.7 pounds)
- Electric system/s: 19.5-27.5 kV 50 Hz AC Catenary
- Current pickup: Overhead AC with symmetric/asymmetric dual pantographs
- Traction motors: 6 × 850 kW (1,140 hp)
Performance figures
- Maximum speed: 160 km/h (99 mph)
- Power output: 5,100 kW (6,800 hp)
- Tractive effort: 526 kN (118,000 lbf)
Career
- Operators: CFR Călători, CFR Marfă, GFR, SERVTRANS, MMV (Hungary)
- Locale: Romania
- First run: 2006 (freight), 2007 (passenger)
- Last run: in operation

The CFR Class 47 is a class of electric locomotives built for Romanian railway operators for use on the Romanian electrified network. They were originally built by Electroputere from 1965 to 1991 and designated as the CFR class 40 or 41. All Class 47 locomotives were modernized by Softronic from 2007. They are operated both by CFR Marfă and CFR Călători.

== History ==
The locomotives are essentially a rebuild/modernisation of the CFR Class EA that were built from the mid 1960s to the early 1990s by the Craiova locomotive works. Starting with the mid 1990s, it was decided to rebuild a number of locomotives, a number of them being modernised between 1998 and 2002 by Siemens-Secheron, resulting in CFR Class 45. The project however was stopped and it wasn't until 2006 when PROMAT and Softronic decided to rebuild a number of locomotives for freight use. Starting in 2007, the passenger locomotive modernisations began as well, but only by Softronic. Modernisation continues, but it is uncertain if it will be stopped or continued as only a small number of locomotives have been modernised in the past years.

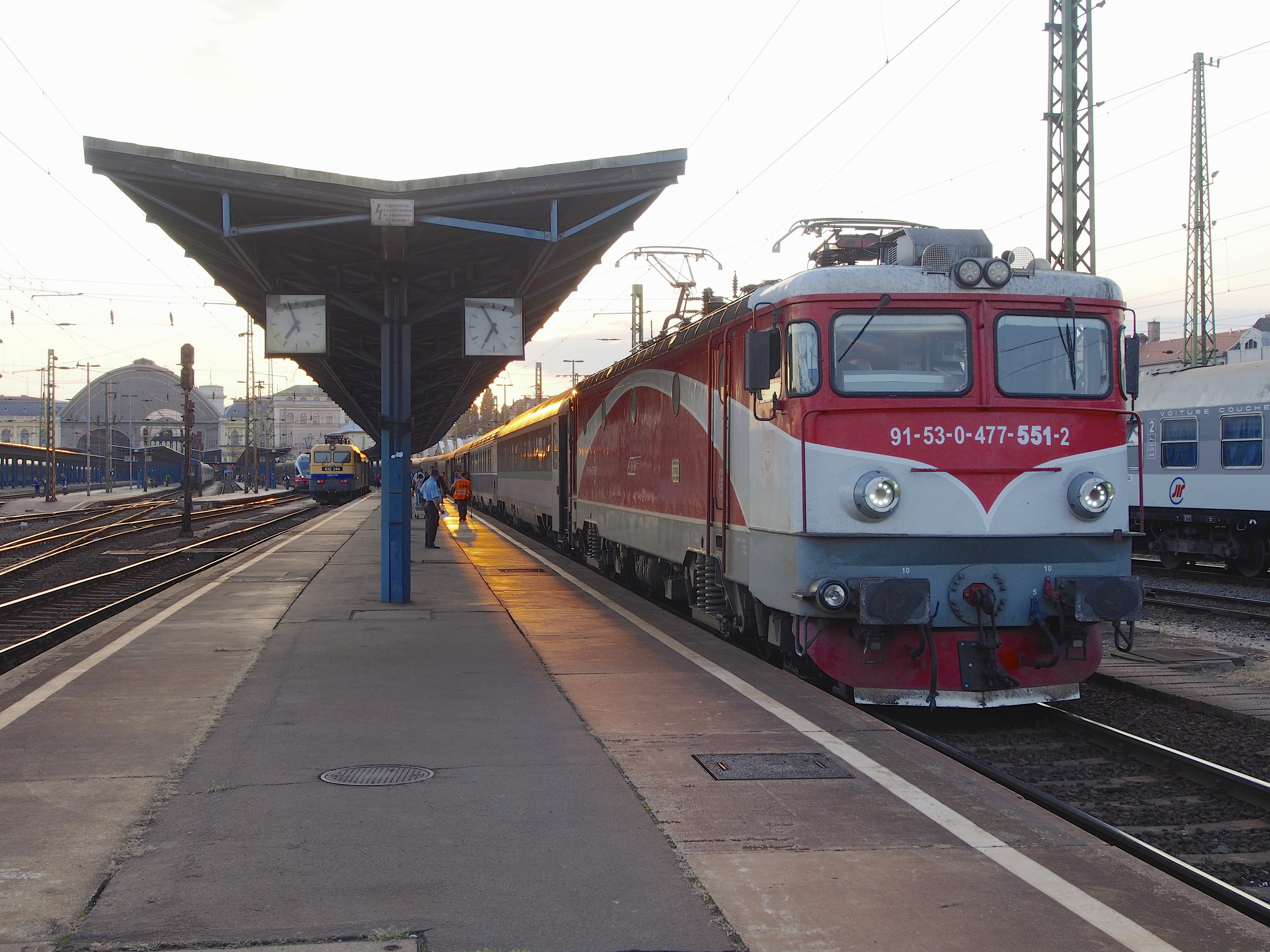
477 551 at Budapest Keleti

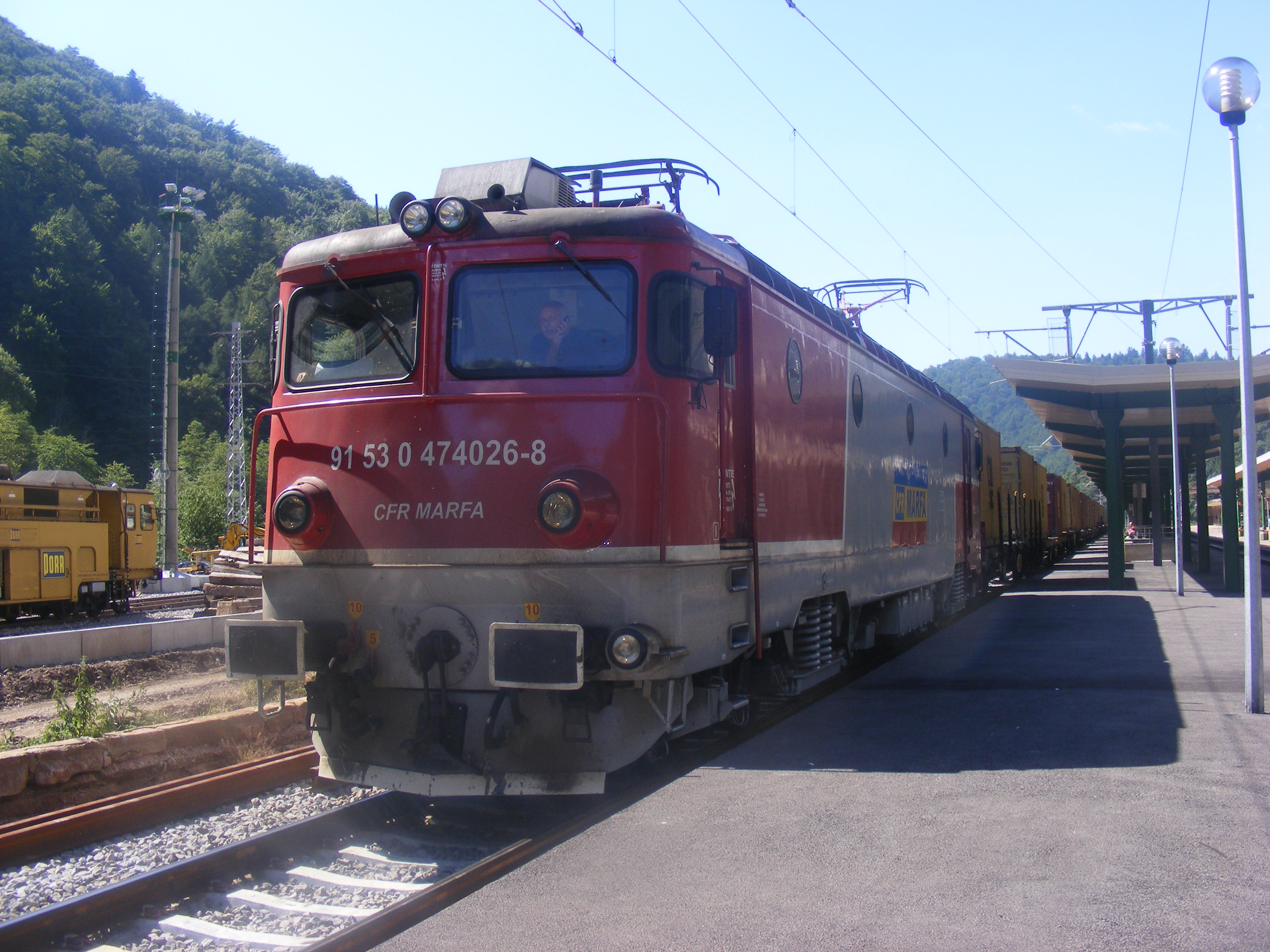
The freight version of the Class 47

== Operation ==
As of 2013, there are over 100 Class 47 locomotives currently in service. They are used by both CFR Marfă and CFR Călători. They were the most powerful locomotives built in Romania until the introduction of the Softronic Transmontana locomotive Class 48 - a locomotive largely based mechanically on the Class 47, but with a completely new traction system based on induction motors, IGBTs power electronics and computer controls.
