= Class 47 =

Class 47 or 47 class may refer to:

- British Rail Class 47
- CFR Class 47
- New South Wales 47 class locomotive
