= CFR Marfă =

Romanian railway company

CFR Marfă logo

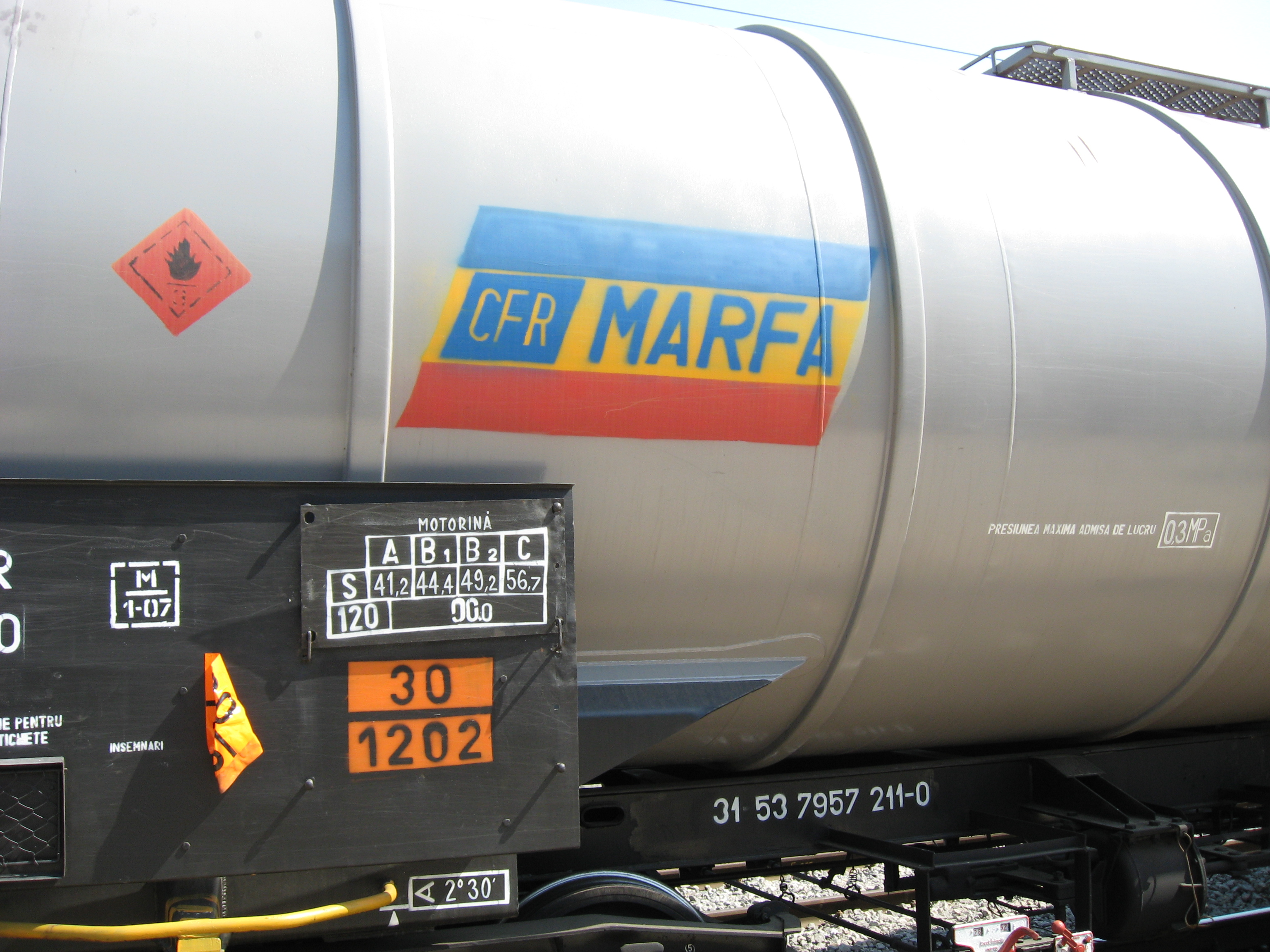
CFR Marfă tank car

CFR Marfă is the state-owned freight railway business of Romania.

Formerly the freight division of Căile Ferate Române (CFR), it was separated in 1998 to become a semi-independent business.

In April 2013, under pressure from the IMF to reform the state sector, the Romanian government offered to sell a 51% stake in CFR Marfă In May 2013, three bids were received; from OmniTRAX, SC Grup Feroviar Român, and a partnership between Transferoviar Grup and Donau-Finanz. The government rejected all three bids. In September 2013, the 51% stake in CFR Marfă was sold to Grup Feroviar Român for €202 million, although complete payment would be deferred until the deal is approved by competition authorities. The deal was never consummated and the company remains completely state owned.

CFR Marfă is making heavy losses. In 2013, it expects to lose €47 million; it lost €20 million in 2012 on earnings of €288.8 million. It has not posted a profit since 2007. As part of the privatisation, the Romanian government has allocated CFR Marfă 606 million lei (€137 million) of rail infrastructure debts. In 2023, the company earned €157 million, while debts totaled €910 million.

In light of CFR Marfă’s dire financial position, the Romanian government has announced plans to liquidate the company and replace it with a new entity, Carpatica Feroviar. The new entity should take over CFR Marfă’s role in the Romanian freight rail sector in March 2025.

== See also ==
- Rolling stock of the Romanian Railways
- Căile Ferate Române
- Rail transport in Romania
