= Grup Feroviar Român =

Romanian private railway company

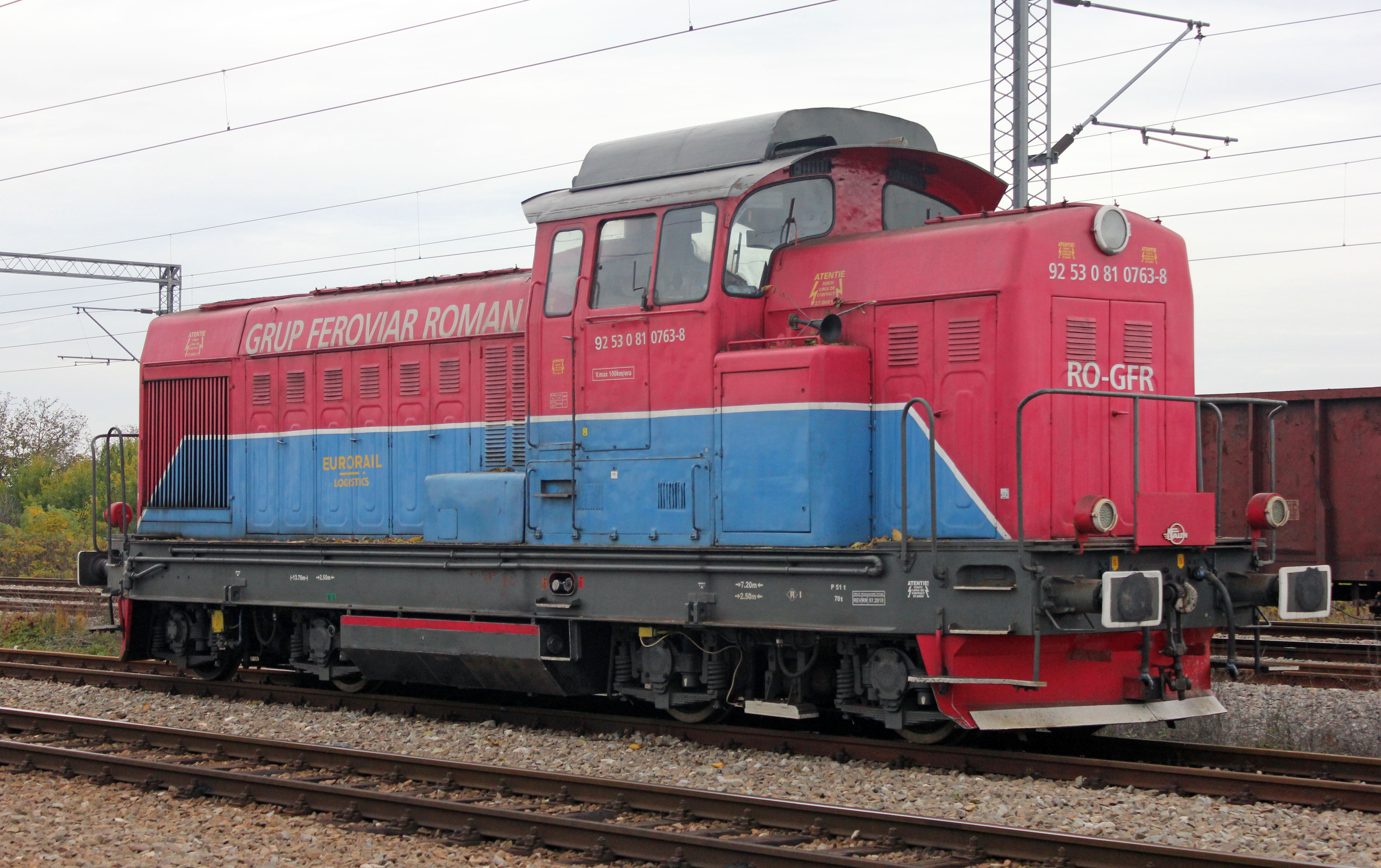
- GFR Class 81 diesel-hydraulic locomotive
- Type: Private
- Industry: Rail transport
- Founded: 2001
- Headquarters: Bucharest
- Key people: Gruia Stoica, CEO
- Products: Railway freight cars
- Revenue: €110 million (2009)
- Number of employees: 2,000 (2009)
- Website: www.gfr.ro

Grup Feroviar Român, or simply GFR, is the largest private railway company in Romania and one of the largest in South Eastern Europe. Founded in 2001, the company owns freight operations in Romania, Hungary, Bulgaria, Greece, Serbia, Ukraine, Moldova, Montenegro and Mozambique, and railcar production and maintenance operations in Romania, Hungary, Serbia and Ukraine. In 2010 GFR operated a park of over 13,500 railroad cars and 285 diesel and electric locomotives.

In 2013, GFR bought a 51% stake in CFR Marfă, which was the freight division of Căile Ferate Române. This purchase cost €202 million. In 2013, a 75% stake in HŽ Cargo was purchased.

== Equipment ==
=== Railroad cars ===
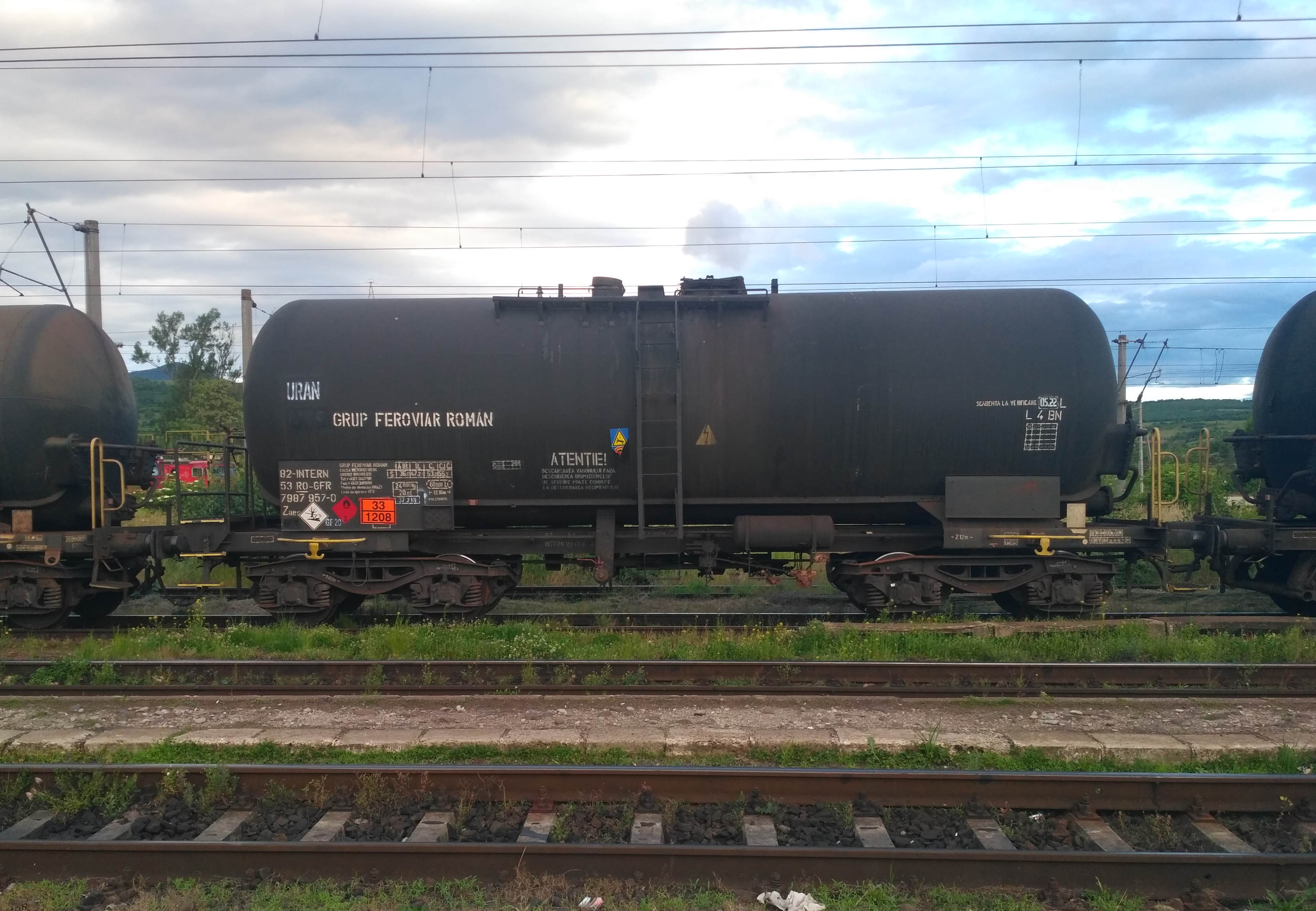
Zaes class tank railway wagon of the Grup Feroviar Român

- tank ( for gas, Diesel fuel-oil, black oil, raw oil);
- tank ( liquid chemicals, etc.);
- platform;
- open (Eacs, Eaos);
- covered (series H);
- specialized for coal (series F);
- specialized for cereals transportation (series U);
- specialized for the transport of bulk chemical fertilizers (series T);
- specialized for the transport of assemblies (series Eakkmos).

=== Electric locomotives ===
- Co'Co' ex-CFR Class 40
- Bo'Bo' ex-CFR Class 43
- Bo'Bo' ex-SNCF Class BB 25100/25150/25200

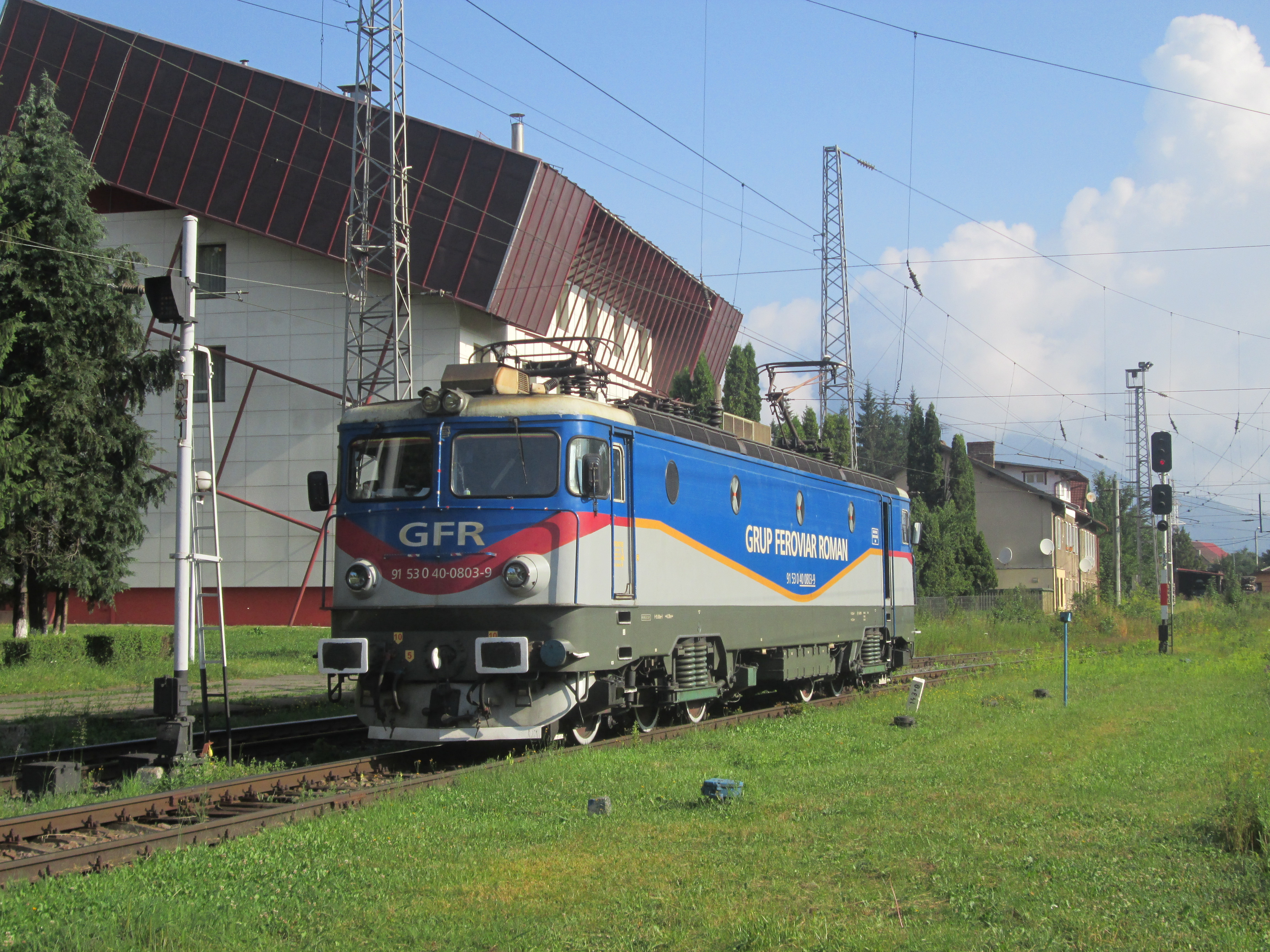
GFR class 40, number 803

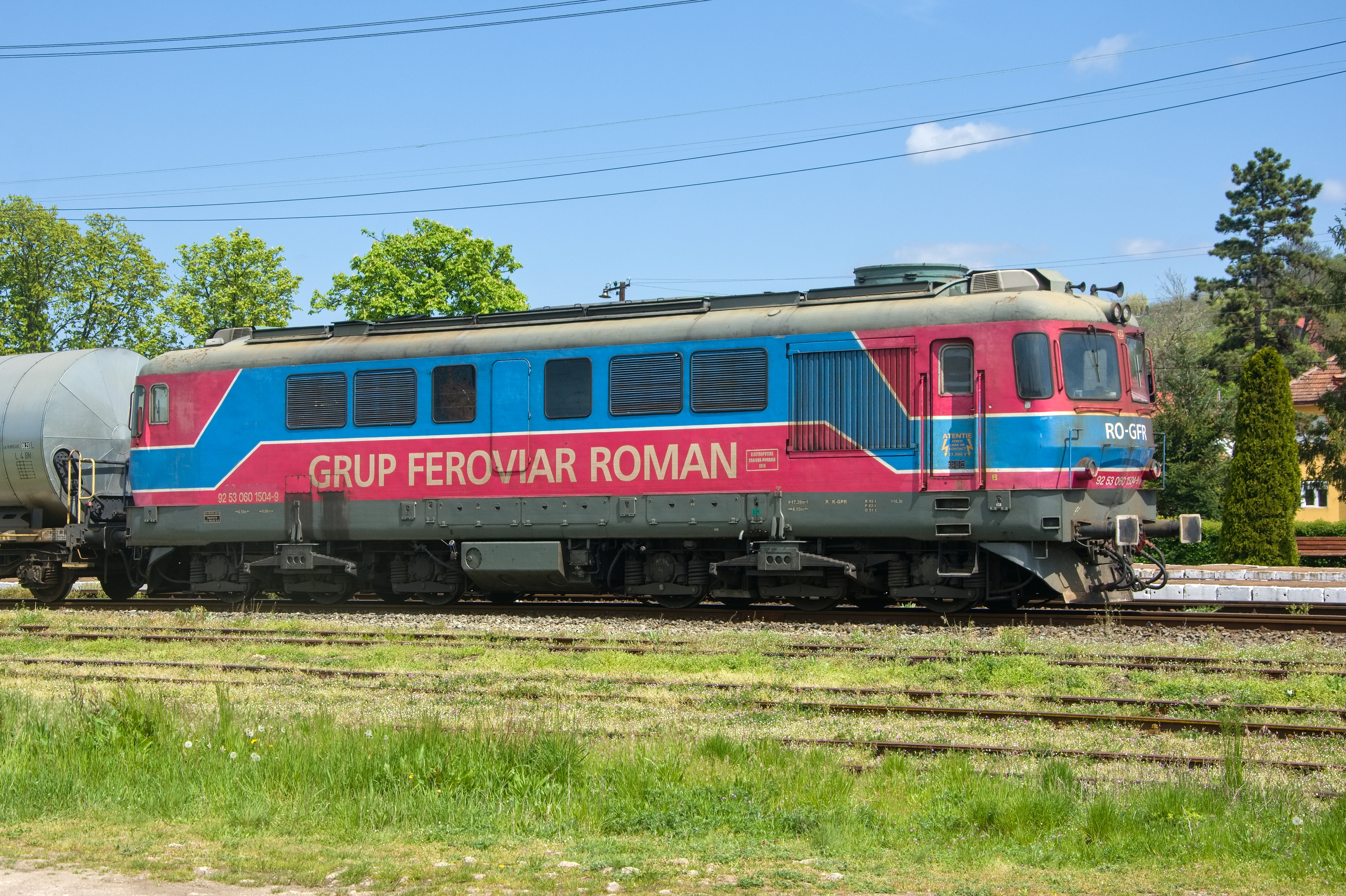
Locomotive Class 60 of GFR, formerly ND2 of the China Railway

=== Diesel–electric locomotives (LDE) ===
- Co'Co' ex-CFR Class 60/62 2,100 hp
- 1,300 hp
- 1,250 hp

=== Diesel-hydraulic locomotives (LDH) ===
- 1,250 hp
- 700 hp
- 450 hp

In 2026, 25 Class 66s were purchased from DB Cargo UK. After being overhauled and repainted at Toton TMD, they will be progressively delivered between 2026 and 2028.

== Other ==
In July 2007 GFR offered a bid for Hungarian company MÁV Cargo of around US$300 million and thus qualified for the final price offering for the company, from third place just behind Slovak company Speed Trans Consortium and a Cyprus based fund.
Control of Bulgarian Railway Company is shared by five Bulgarian companies and one Romanian company, Grup Feroviar Roman Bucharest.
The company also bought in 2006 the largest Serbian wagon construction and maintenance company, Zelvoz Smederevo.

== See also ==
- Remar Paşcani
