= Electroputere =

Rolling stock manufacturer

Electroputere S.A.
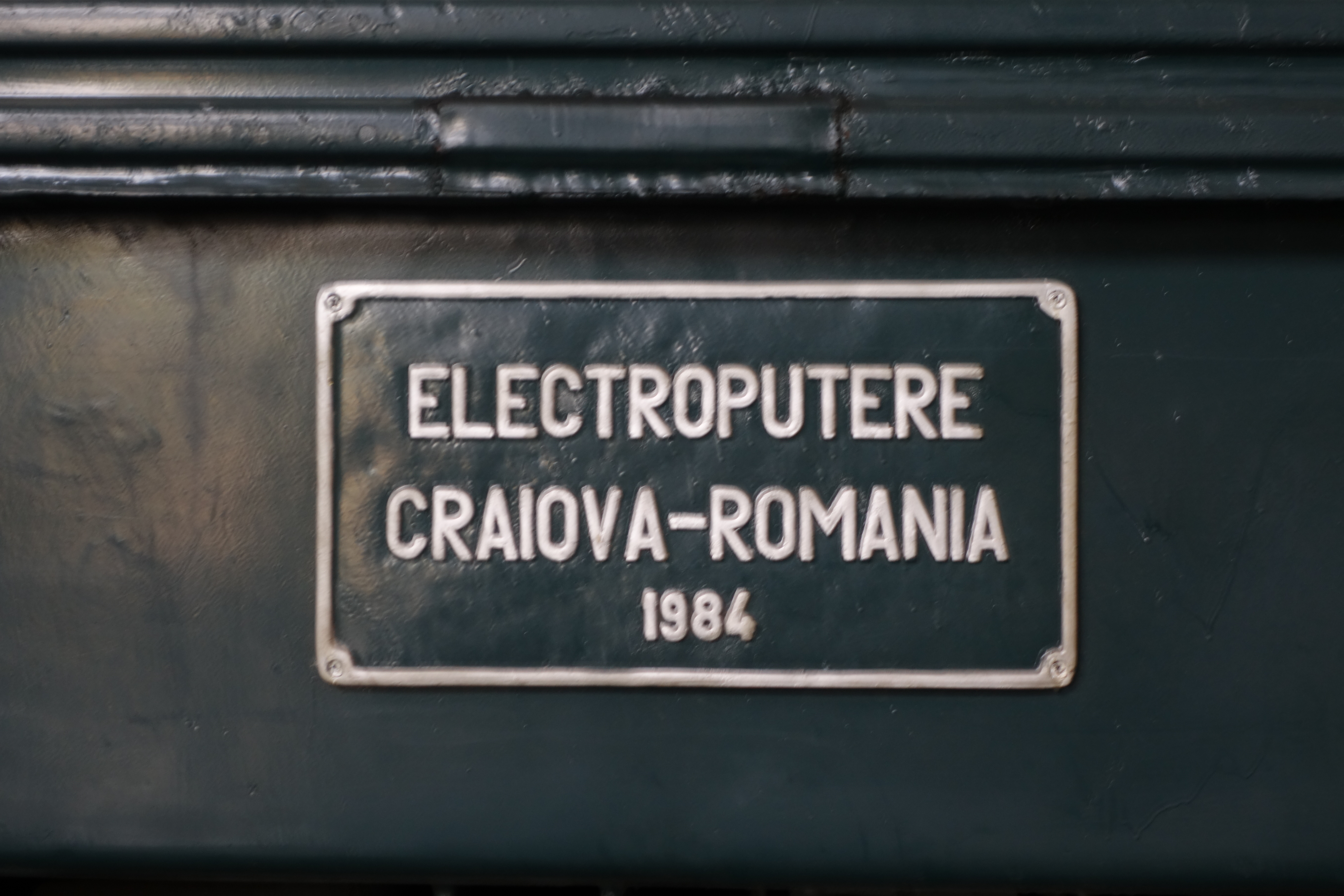
- Type: Public: (BVB: EPT)
- Industry: Railroad; Power Generation
- Founded: 1949
- Headquarters: Craiova, Romania
- Products: Locomotives; Electric motors OEM parts
- Services: Locomotive maintenance Locomotive management Training
- Website: electroputere.ro

Electroputere S.A. (which translates as Electropower in English) is a Romanian company based in Craiova. Founded in 1949, it was one of the largest industrial companies in Romania. Electroputere has produced more than 2,400 diesel locomotives, and 1,050 electric locomotives for the Romanian, Bulgarian, Chinese, and Polish railways, additionally producing other urban vehicles and complex equipment.

== Products ==
Electroputere are currently manufactures of:

- Industrial electrical parts – circuit breakers, transformers etc.
- Industrial electric motors & Converters
- Heavy duty power transformers
- Railway and Urban vehicles.

They also have divisions specialising in:

- Forging and molding metal
- Equipment repairing
- Tools modernisation.

== Electric and diesel-electric locomotives ==
=== Export orders ===
A total of 1,105 locomotives were delivered between 1972 and 1991 to railway companies in the following countries:

- Bulgaria
- China
- Greece
- Iran
- Poland
- United Kingdom
- (Socialist Federal Republic of Yugoslavia) Yugoslavia

One of its more notable foreign orders was for the Class 56 locomotives for British Rail. The 30 locomotives were outsourced to Electroputere because Brush Traction could not build them at its own plant; however, upon their arrival in the UK, the machines were deemed to be unsuitable for use, as they suffered from poor construction standards, and had to be withdrawn and extensively rebuilt. (However, they were seen as being perfectly reasonable for use in Romania by the Romanian crews who tested them).

In 1955–1959, Electroputere produced the V54 tram, which was delivered to the cities of Bucharest, Timișoara and Oradea. Unmodified examples ran up to 1989, whilst the largest number of examples ran in Bucharest, serving as the backbone of the city's network in the 1960s (they were later modernized in 1976–1982, and ran up to June 2000). Aside from this, Electroputere modernized multiple V3A trams between 1997 and 2002, with the first three of them receiving Holec (Holland Electric) equipment. Between 1994 and 1996, Electroputere and FAUR modernized multiple Astra IVA sets for operation on the M2 line of the Bucharest Metro, the project eventually failed and the blue IVA sets never entered service.

The most important railway locomotives, as classed by the Romanian railway factory nomenclature were the LDE 2100, LE 5100 and LDE 3000/4000, which were mainly delivered to the Romanian Railways, and a few foreign customers. Apart from the latter, which were withdrawn in the mid-1990s and early-2000s due to their uneconomical nature and increased fuel consumption, the LDE 2100 and LE 5100 form the backbone of the Romanian Railways network.

=== Photo Gallery ===
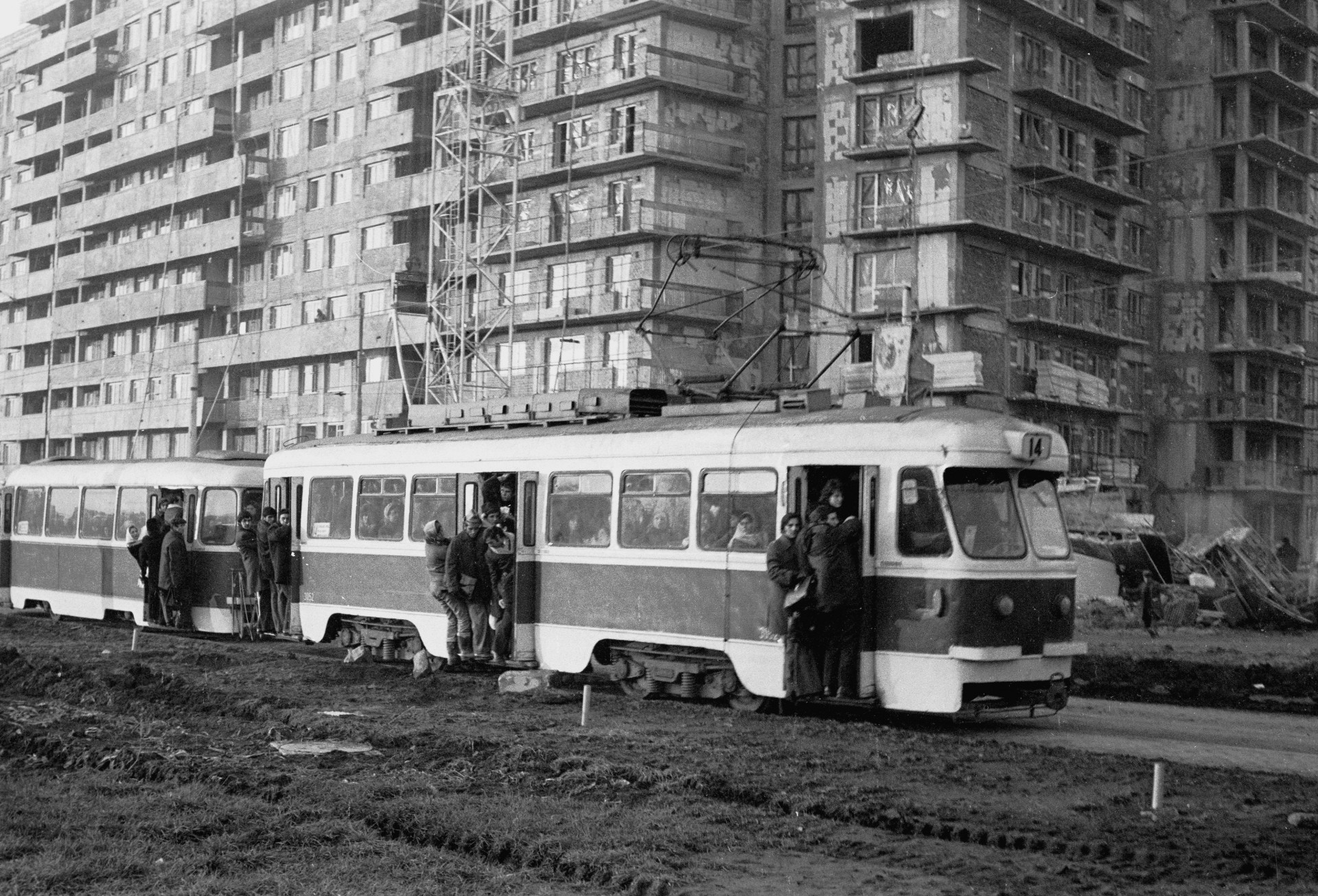
1954: The first major order for Electroputere occurs when the V54 is produced for the Bucharest tram network, entering service in January 1955.

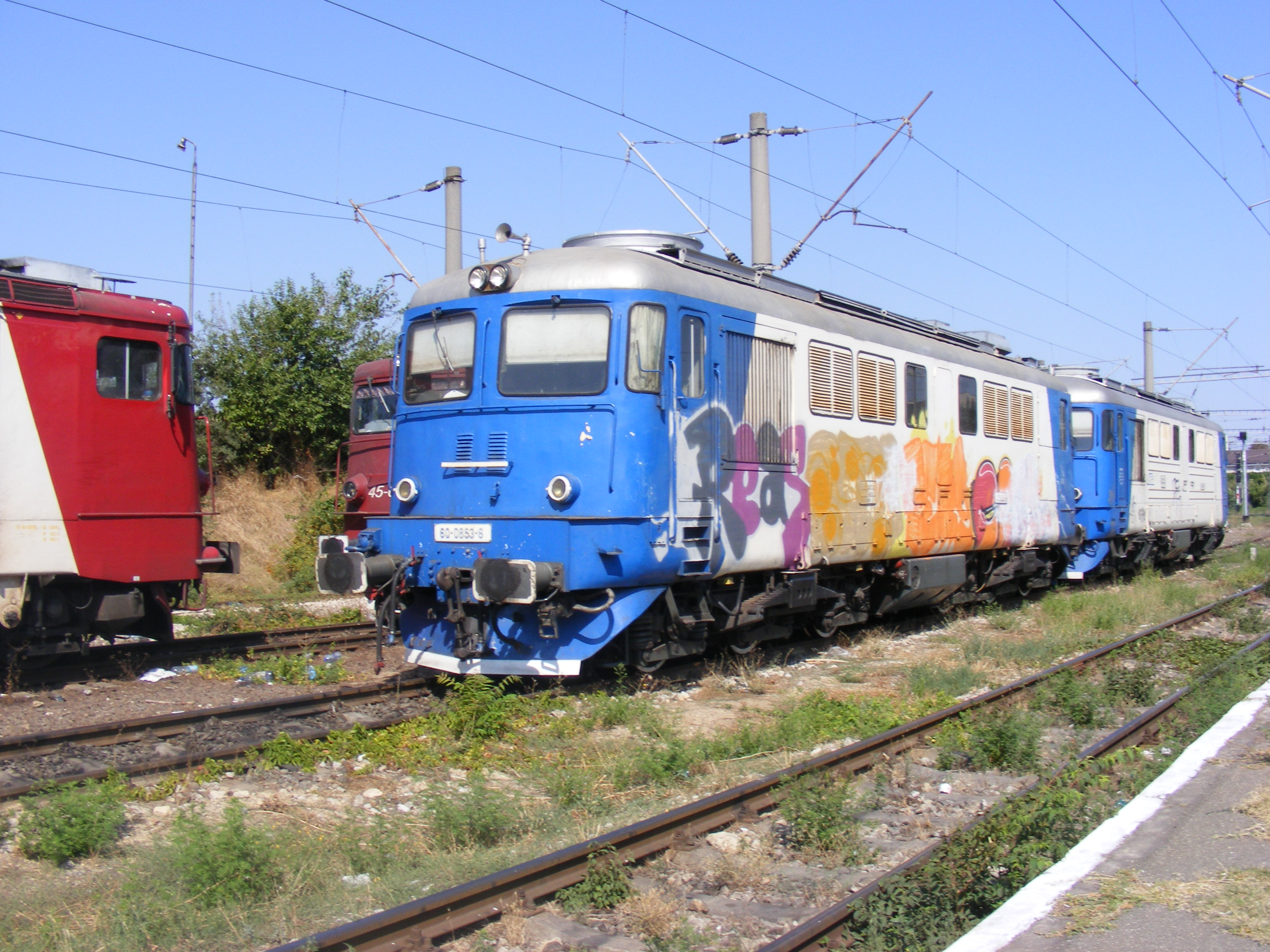
1959: LDE 2100 locomotive (produced under licence from SLM, Sulzer, Oerlikon, BBC).

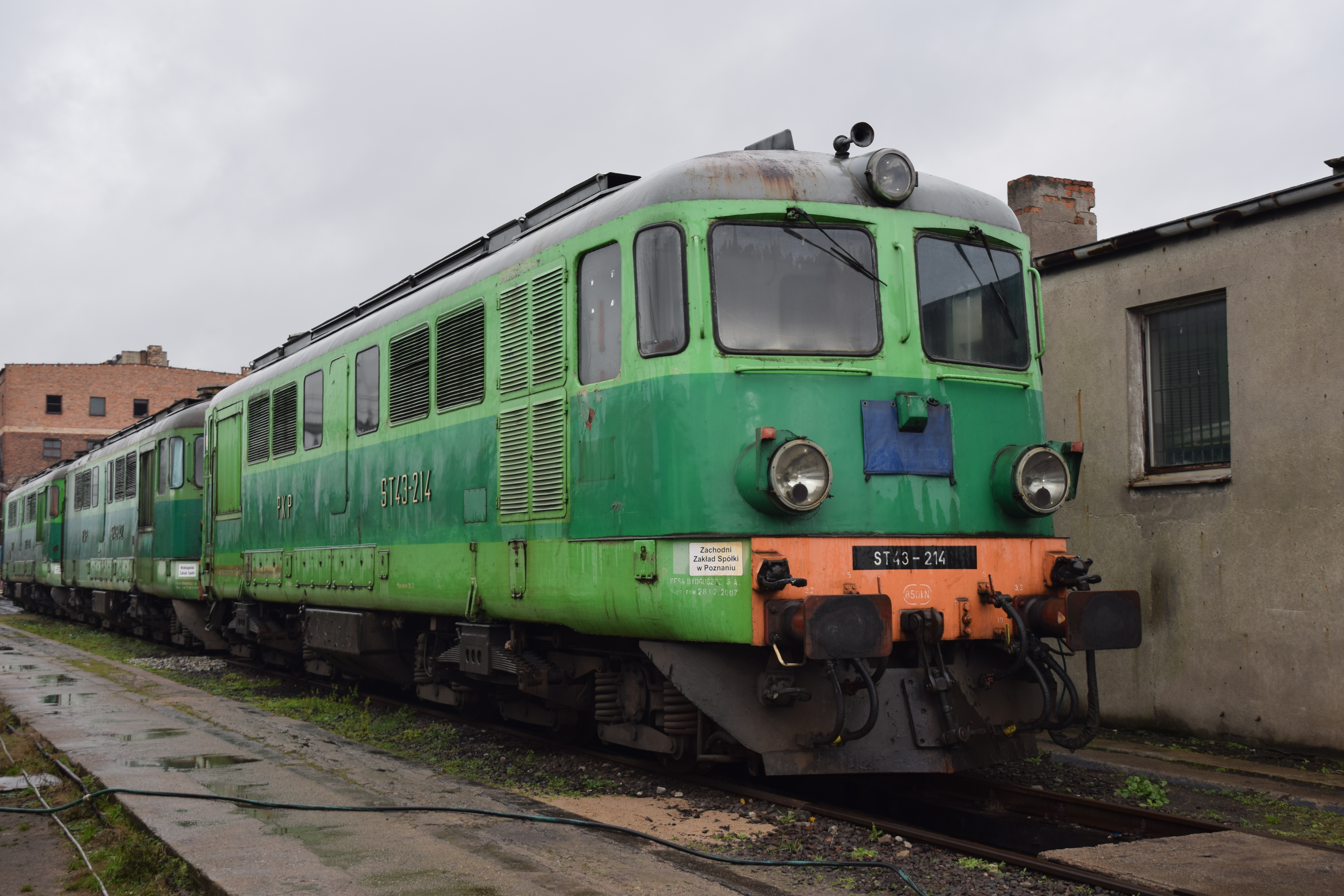
1965: Electroputere begins delivering its first export (diesel) locomotives to Poland (PKP ST43).

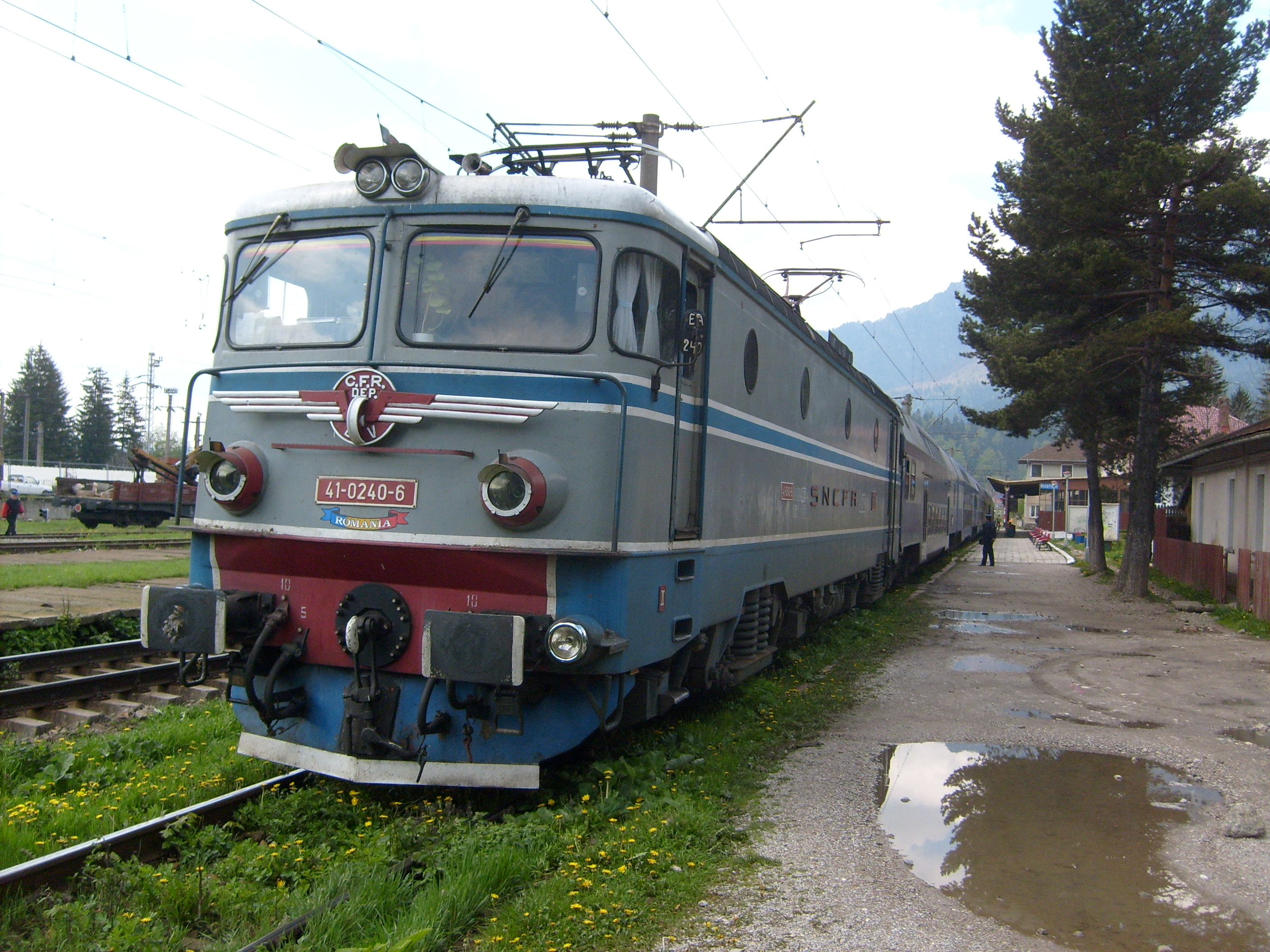
1967: LE 5100 locomotive (produced under licence from ASEA and NOHAB).

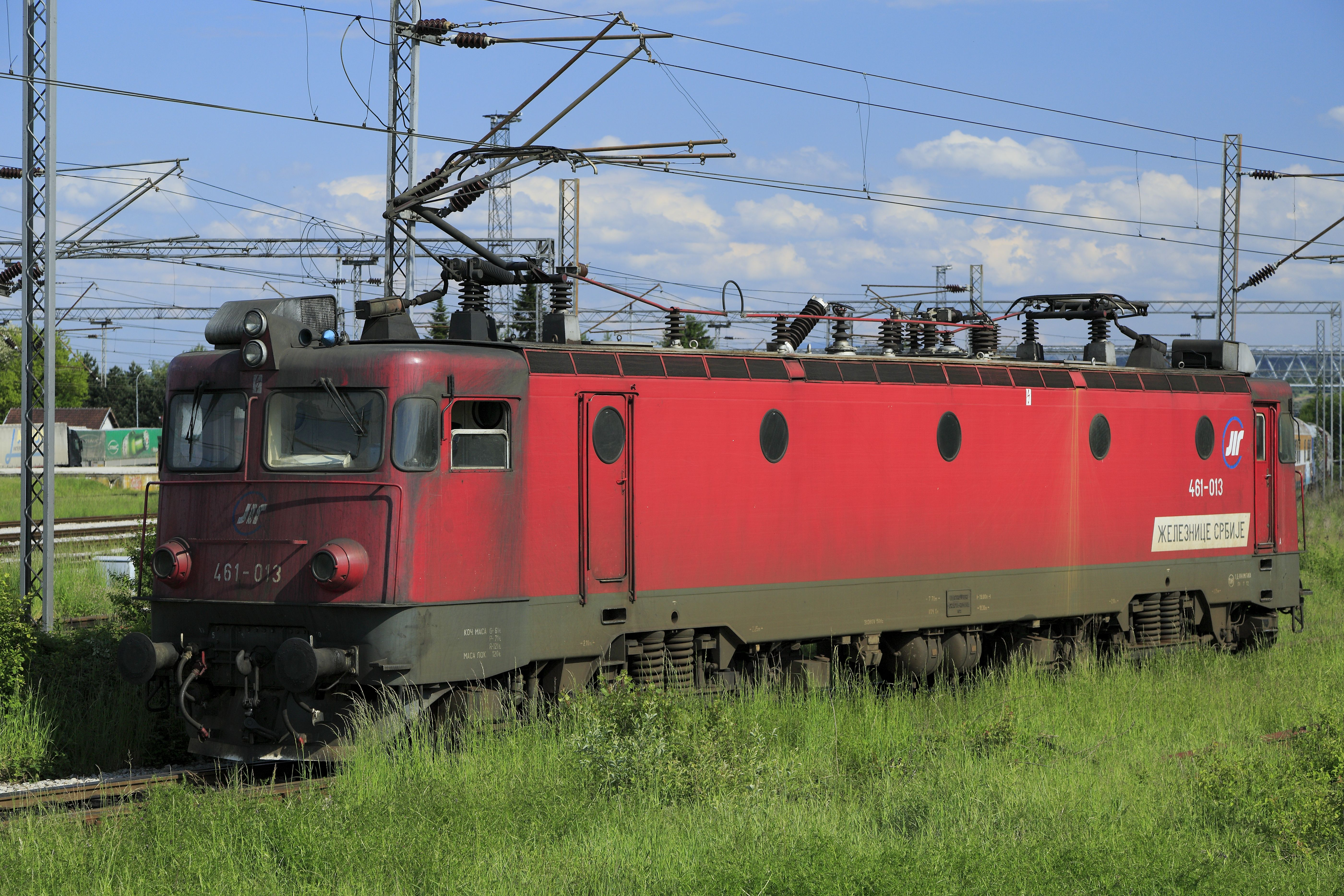
1971: First exports of electric locomotives begin, with the JŽ 461 locomotives being delivered to Yugoslavia, for use on the Belgrade-Bar rail line.
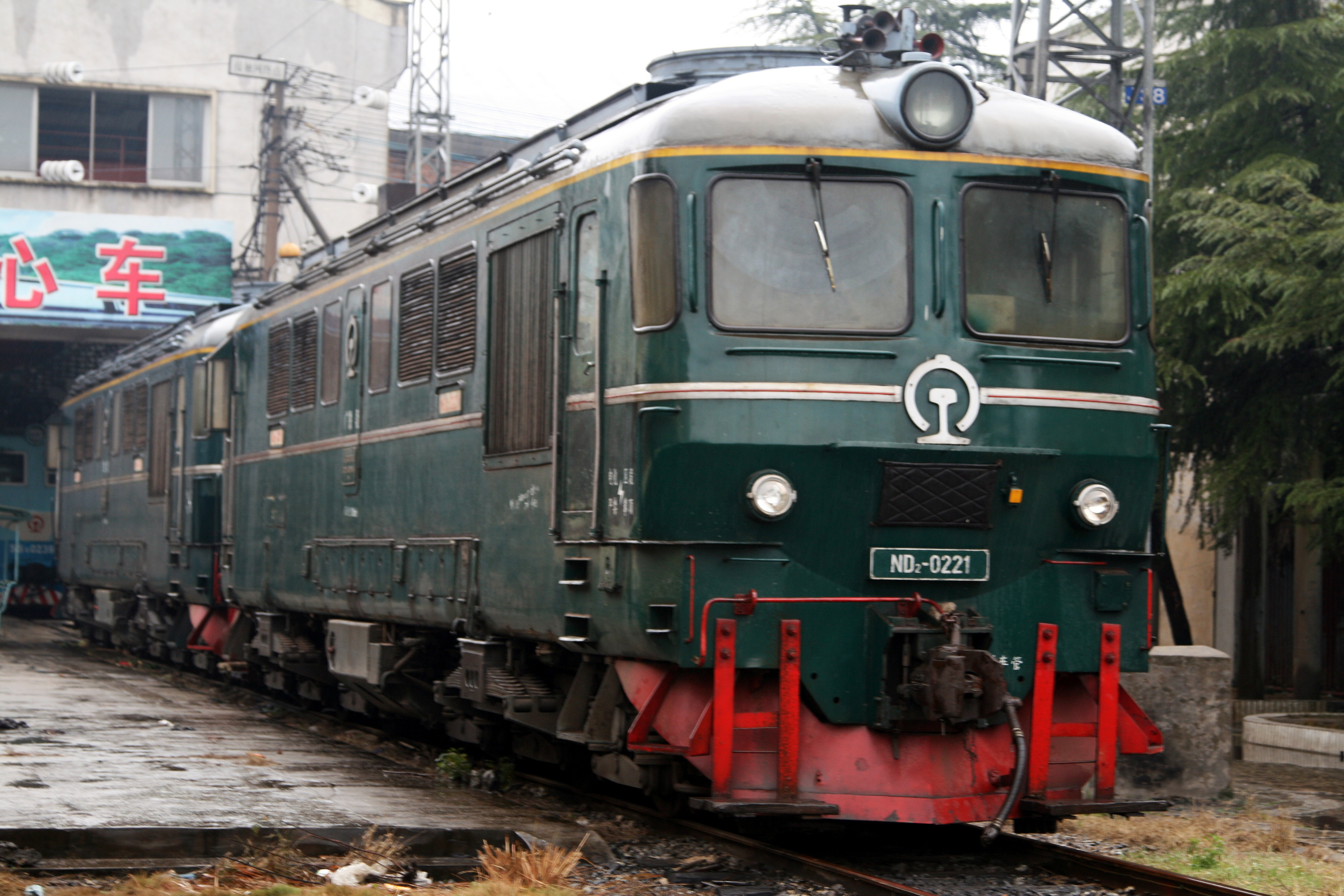
1972: China becomes an important customer for Electroputere, when it orders 284 locomotives based on the LDE 2100 design, known as the ND2.

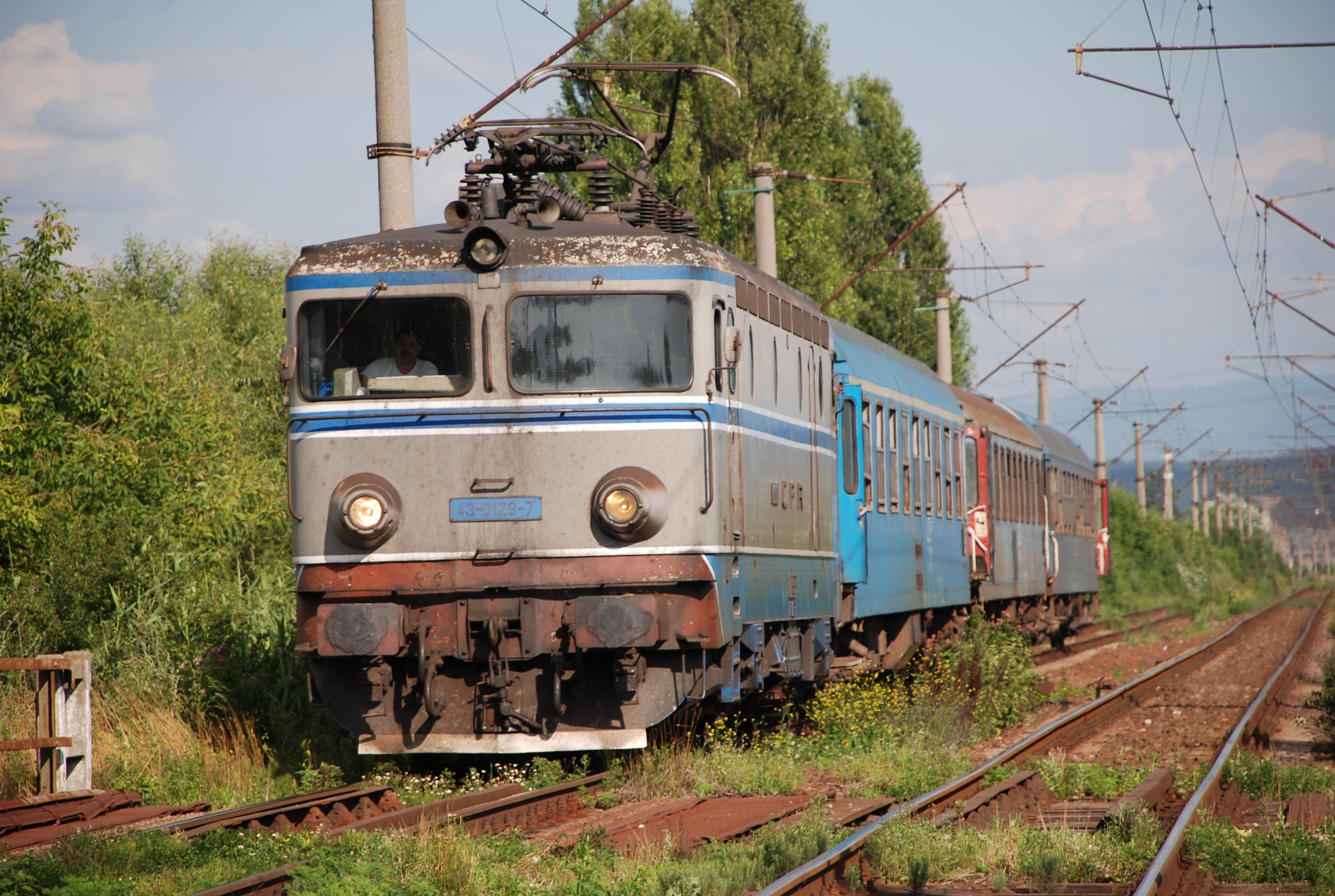
1973: Electroputere Craiova and UCM Reșita sign an agreement to produce the LE 3400, the local variant of the JŽ 441 produced by Rade Končar and MIN Niš.

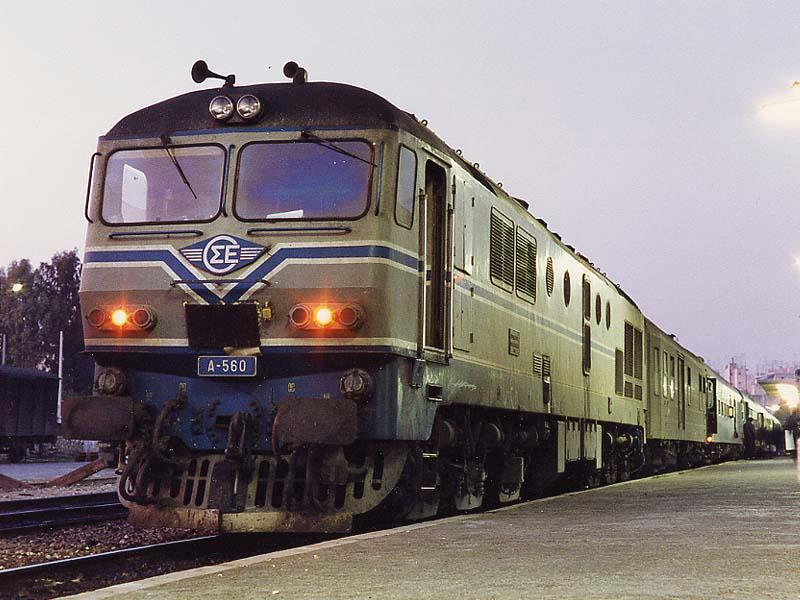
1975: Electroputere develops the LDE 3000 and LDE 4000 locomotives, using American-built ALCO engines built at UCM Reșita. Pictured here is a 1982-built LDE 4000 operating for the Greek Railways at Athens.

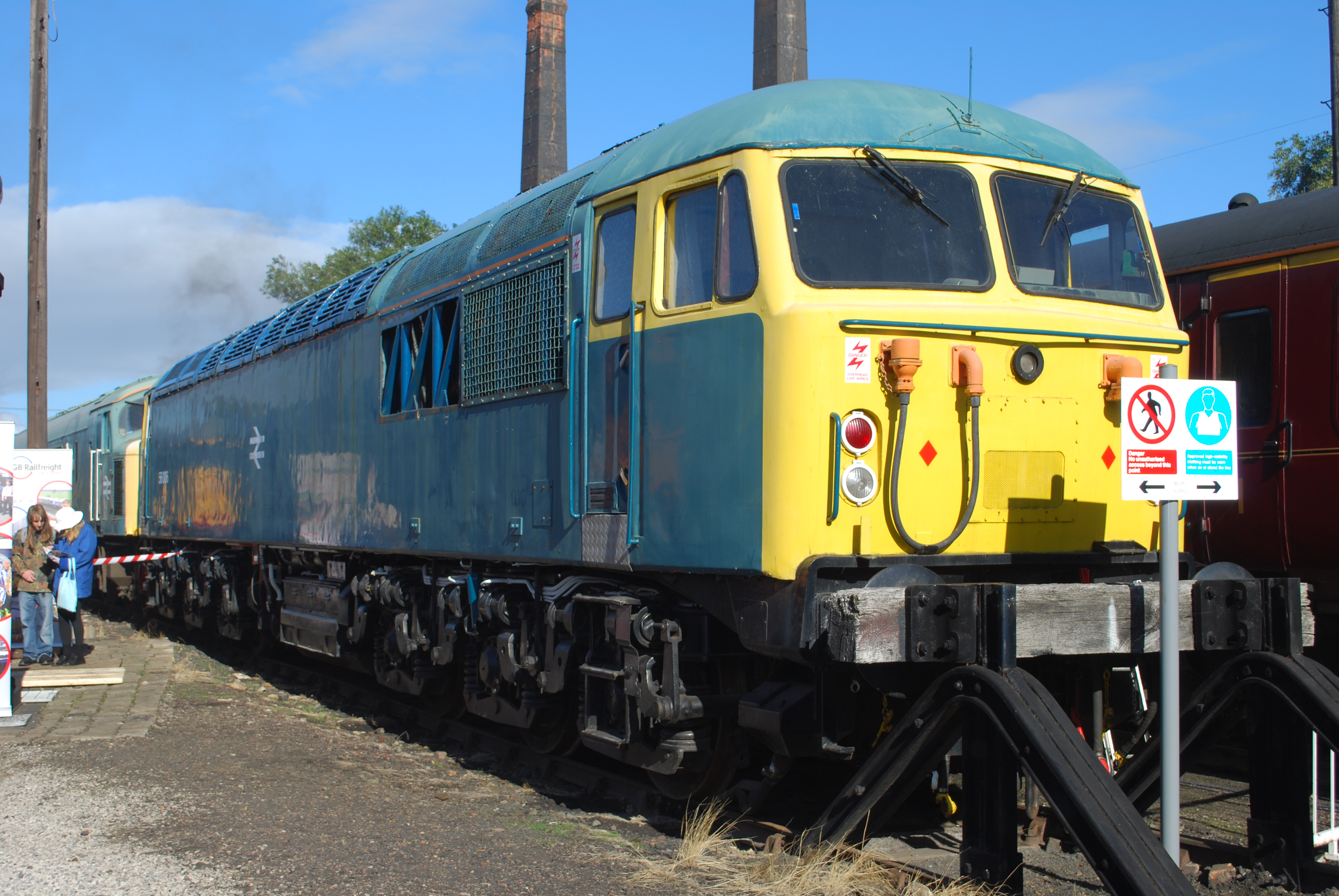
1976: In the most important order at that time, Electroputere delivers 30 LDE 3500 locomotives, known as the BR Class 56.

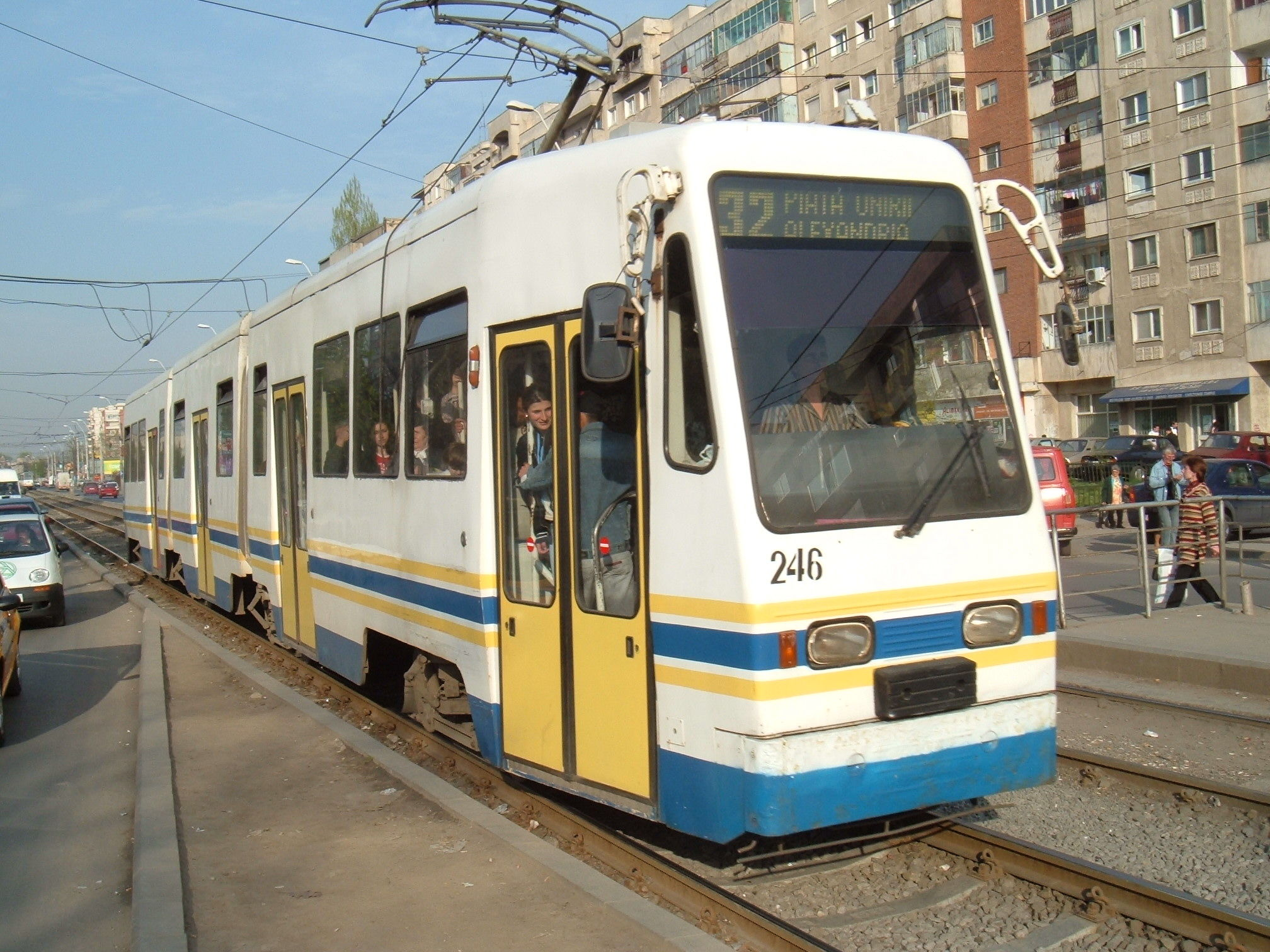
1997: Along with FAUR, Electroputere is invited in the V3A modernization programme, modernizing 13 trams, 10 using home-made equipment.

== See also ==
- Romanian Railways – Căile Ferate Române
- FC Electroputere Craiova - a football club with a similar name
