= Căile Ferate Române =

Company operating railways in Romania

- Type: Group of public companies
- Industry: Rail transport
- Founded: 1 April 1880
- Defunct: 1 October 1998
- Headquarters: Palatul CFR, Piața Gării de Nord, Bucharest, Romania
- Products: Rail transport, cargo transport, services
- Owner: The Romanian state

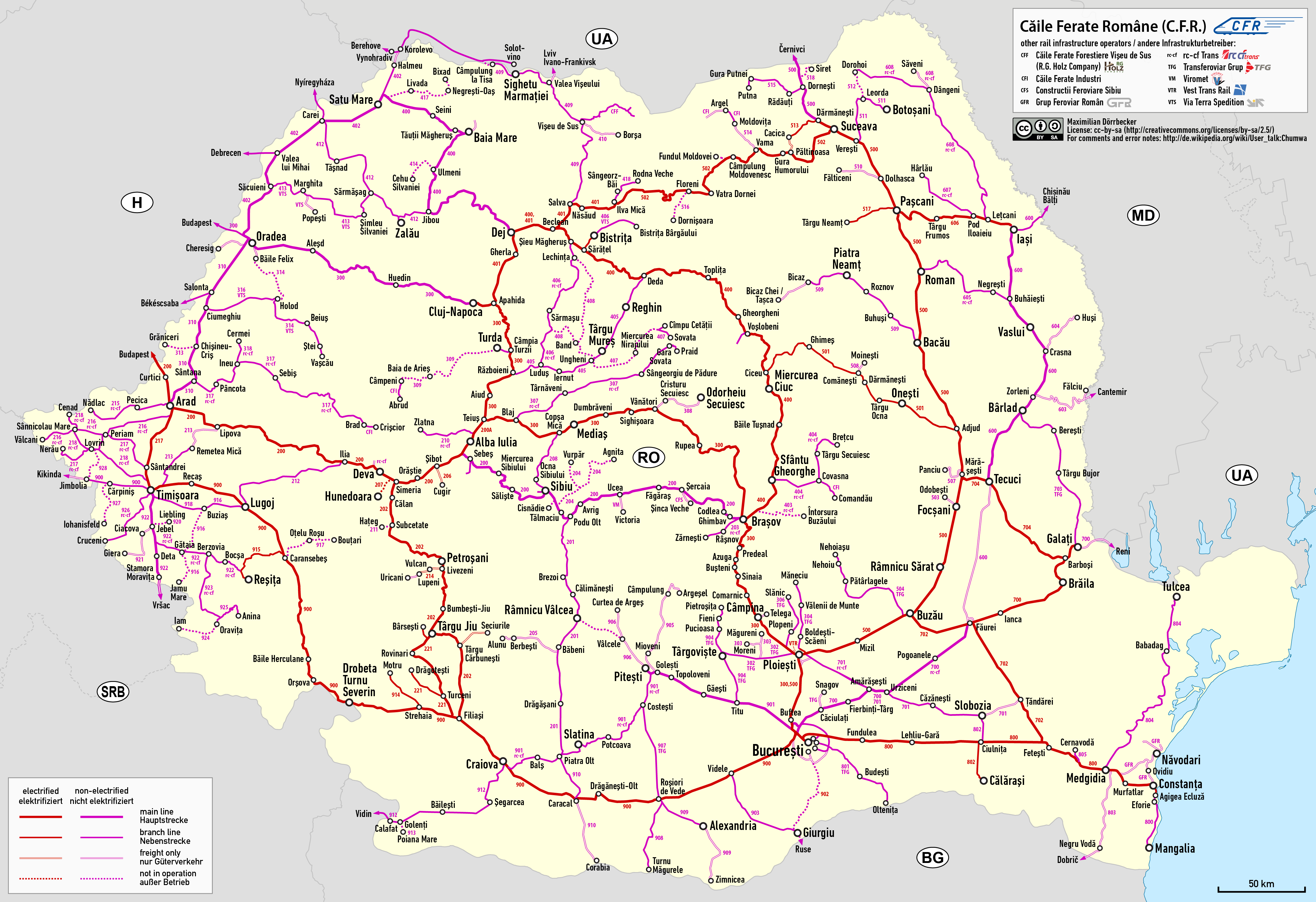
Railway network of Romania

Căile Ferate Române (Romanian pronunciation: [ˈkə.ile feˈrate roˈmɨne]; abbreviated as the CFR) was the state railway carrier of Romania. The company was dissolved on 1 October, 1998, by splitting into several successor companies. CFR as an entity that existed from 1880 even though the first railway on current Romanian territory was opened in 1854. CFR was divided into four autonomous companies:

- CFR Călători, responsible for passenger services;
- CFR Marfă, responsible for freight transport;
- Compania Națională de Căi Ferate CFR, manages the infrastructure on the Romanian railway network; and
- Societatea Feroviară de Turism, or SFT, which manages scenic and tourist railways.

CFR was headquartered in Bucharest and had regional divisions centered in Bucharest, Brașov, Cluj-Napoca, Constanța, Craiova, Galați, Iași, and Timișoara. Its International Union of Railways code is 53-CFR.

== History ==
=== Railways in the nineteenth century ===
The first railway line on Romania's present-day territory was opened on 20 August, 1854 and ran between Oravița in Banat and Baziaș, a port on the Danube. The line, which had a length of 62.5 km (38.8 mi), was used solely for the transportation of coal. From 12 January, 1855, the line was operated by Imperial Royal Privileged Austrian State Railway Company, the Banat province being at that time part of the Austrian Empire. After several improvements in the following months, the line was opened to passenger traffic from 1 November 1856.

Between 1864 and 1880, several railways were constructed in the area of the Kingdom of Romania. On 1 September 1865, the English company John Trevor-Barkley began construction on the Bucharest–Giurgiu line. Commissioned by the King of Romania, the line was opened to traffic on 26 August 1869. The Bucharest-Giurgiu line was the first railway built on Romanian territory at that time (considering that the Oravița-Baziaș line was part of Austria-Hungary, even though it now lies on Romanian territory).

In September 1866, the Romanian Parliament voted for the construction of a 915 km (569 mi) railway, from Vârciorova in the south to Roman in the north, via Ploiești, Bucharest, Buzău, Brăila, Galați, and Tecuci, all important population centres. The price for the construction was at that time 270,000 gold francs per kilometre and was contracted to the German Strousberg consortium. The line was opened in various stages, the first stage (Ploiesti–Bucharest–Galați–Roman) being opened to traffic on 13 September 1872, while the Vârciorova–Ploiești segment was opened some time later, on 9 May 1878. The Vârciorova-Roman line was an important part of Romania's rail infrastructure because it spanned the entire Kingdom and provided an important connection for passengers and freight between several significant Wallachian and Moldavian cities.

On 10 September 1868, Bucharest's Gara de Nord (North Station) was finalised. In January 1880, the Romanian Parliament voted to transfer the ownership of the Vârciorova-Roman line from the private administration of the Strousberg consortium to state ownership, under the administration of CFR. 1880 therefore marks the start of the Căile Ferate Române institution which survives to this date. The first administration of CFR was made up of Ioan Kalinderu, Eugeniu Stătescu, and Ștefan Fălcoianu.

In May 1868, the Romanian state concluded an agreement with another German consortium, known as the "Offenheim Consortium", for the construction of several shorter railways in the region of Moldavia. The lines, which had a total length of 224 km (139 mi), would run from Roman to Ițcani, from Pașcani to Iași and from Verești to Botoșani. In 1870, the Iași railway station was inaugurated and the lines were progressively opened from December 1869 to November 1871. Due to the poor management of the lines by the Offenheim Consortium, they were placed under the management of CFR in January 1889.

Meanwhile, during the Romanian War of Independence in 1877, Romania annexed the region of Dobrogea, which had previously belonged to the Ottoman Empire. The Romanian state placed under the management of CFR the Constanța–Cernavodă line, which had been opened during the Ottoman times in 1860. The Bucharest-Giurgiu line, the first line constructed in the Kingdom of Romania, was also placed under the administration of CFR during this time.

Hence, by 1889, the Romanian state became the owner of all of the lines in the Kingdom of Romania, the railway system having a total length of 1,377 km (856 mi).

== Railways in the early twentieth century ==
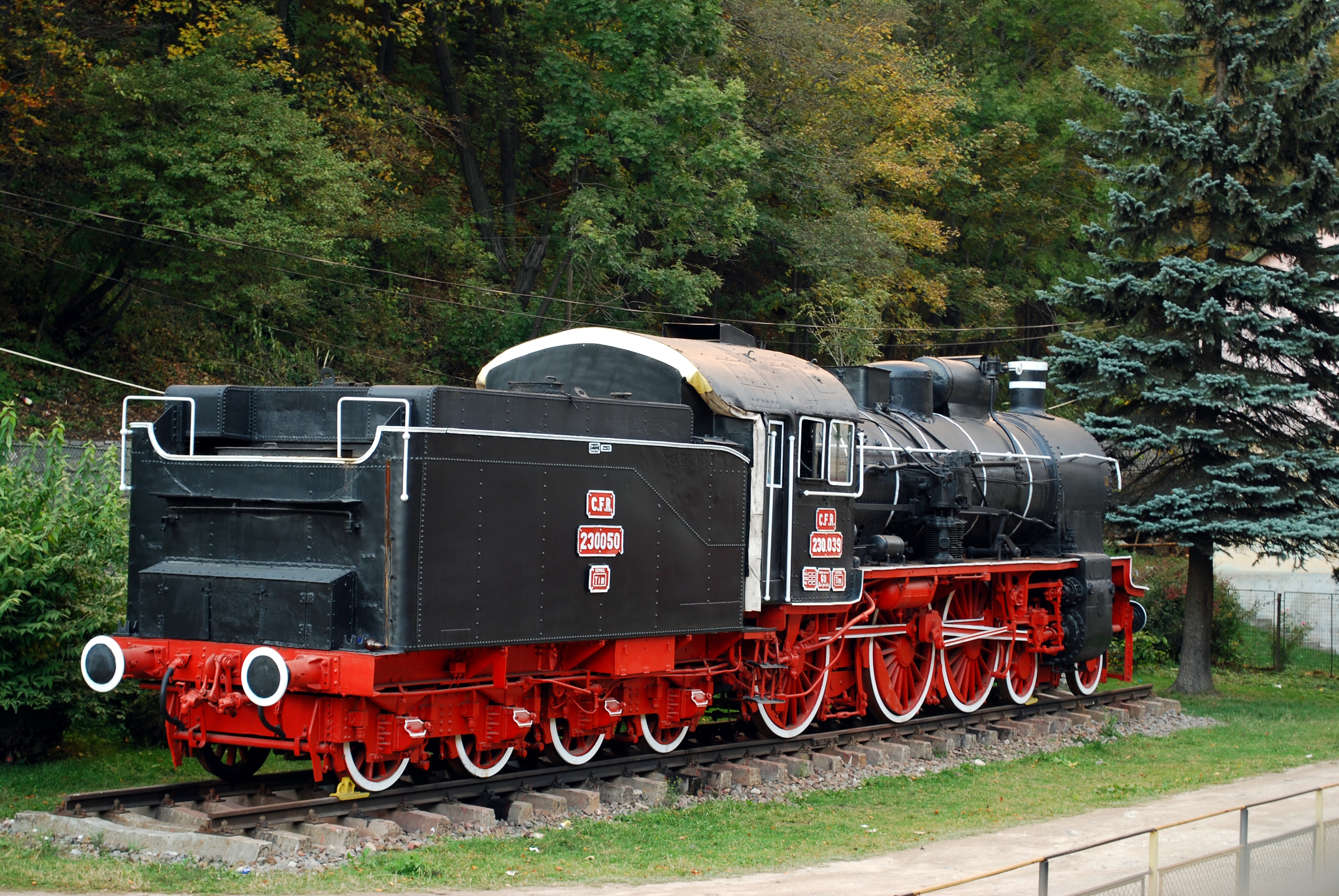
CFR steam engine 230-039 exhibited in Sinaia railway station. The 230 series were steam engines used for passenger train service.

In 1918, the historical regions of Transylvania, Banat, Bassarabia, and Bucovina united with the Kingdom of Romania to form Greater Romania. As a result, all railway lines in these regions, previously under the ownership of Austria-Hungary or the Russian Empire, were placed under the administration of CFR. This event was significant for Romanian railways because it meant that the large Arad rolling stock and steel factory, previously located on Austro-Hungarian territory, was now part of Romania, and was consequently used to produce a wide range of rolling stock and locomotives for CFR.

During this time, various railway lines were "doubled" — a second set of tracks was laid alongside the original tracks to permit trains to run in opposite directions simultaneously — to increase traffic flow on those routes. The first line to be doubled was the Bucharest–Ploiești–Câmpina line, where doubling was completed in 1912. In the period between the wars, various other lines were doubled, including:

- Constanța–Cernavodă (1931)
- Adjud–Tecuci (1933)
- Teiuș–Apahida (1940)
- Câmpina–Brașov (1941)
- Buzău–Mărășești (1942)

During the 1920s and 1930s CFR also bought several new locomotives and cars, embarking on a plan of widespread modernisation. Diesel traction was introduced, and the Malaxa high-speed DMUs (a modernised version of which are still in use as commuter trains in Banat) were built.

A significant event in the history of the railways was the Grivița Strike of 1933, which occurred during the Great Depression and resulted in violent clashes between railway workers and police. Also after the 1940 Treaty of Craiova, 83 kilometers of Romanian built railway infrastructure in Southern Dobruja were ceded to Bulgaria.

== The Holocaust ==
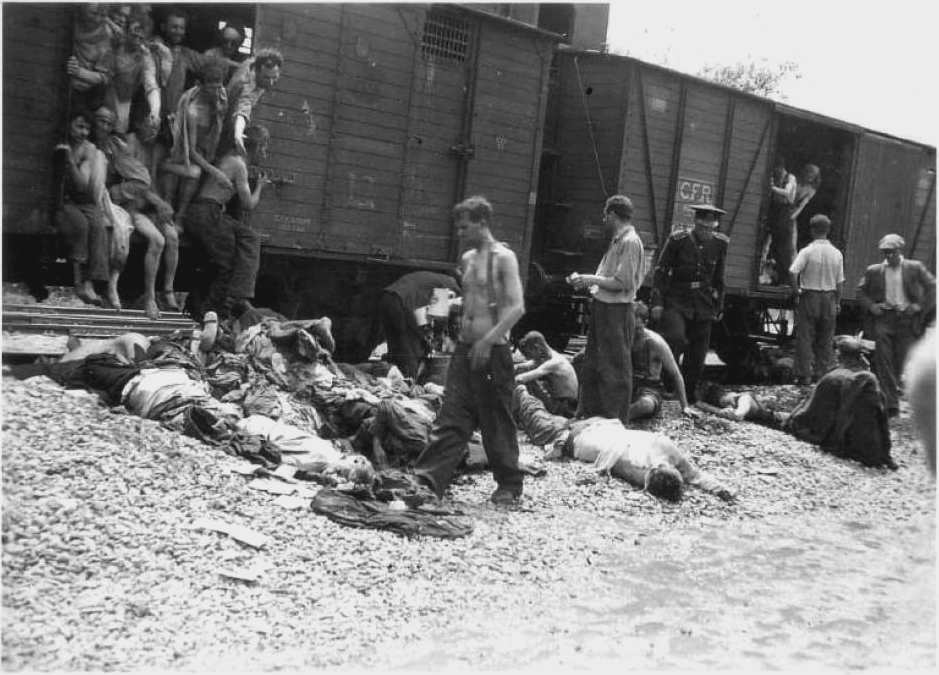
Pulling dead Jews from a CFR Holocaust death train in Romania after traveling 7 days, July 1941.

During World War II, CFR (Romanian Railways) was involved in the transport of Jewish and Romani people from Bessarabia, Bukovina and Regat to concentration camps set up in Transnistria. In a notable example, during the Iași pogrom events, Jews were forcibly loaded onto freight cars with planks hammered in place over the windows and traveled for seven (7) days in unimaginable conditions. Many died and were gravely affected by lack of air, blistering heat, lack of water, food or medical attention. These veritable death trains arrived to their destinations, Podu Iloaiei and Călărași, with only one-fifth of their passengers alive. No official apology was released yet by CFR for their role in the Holocaust in Romania.

== Railways in Communist Romania ==
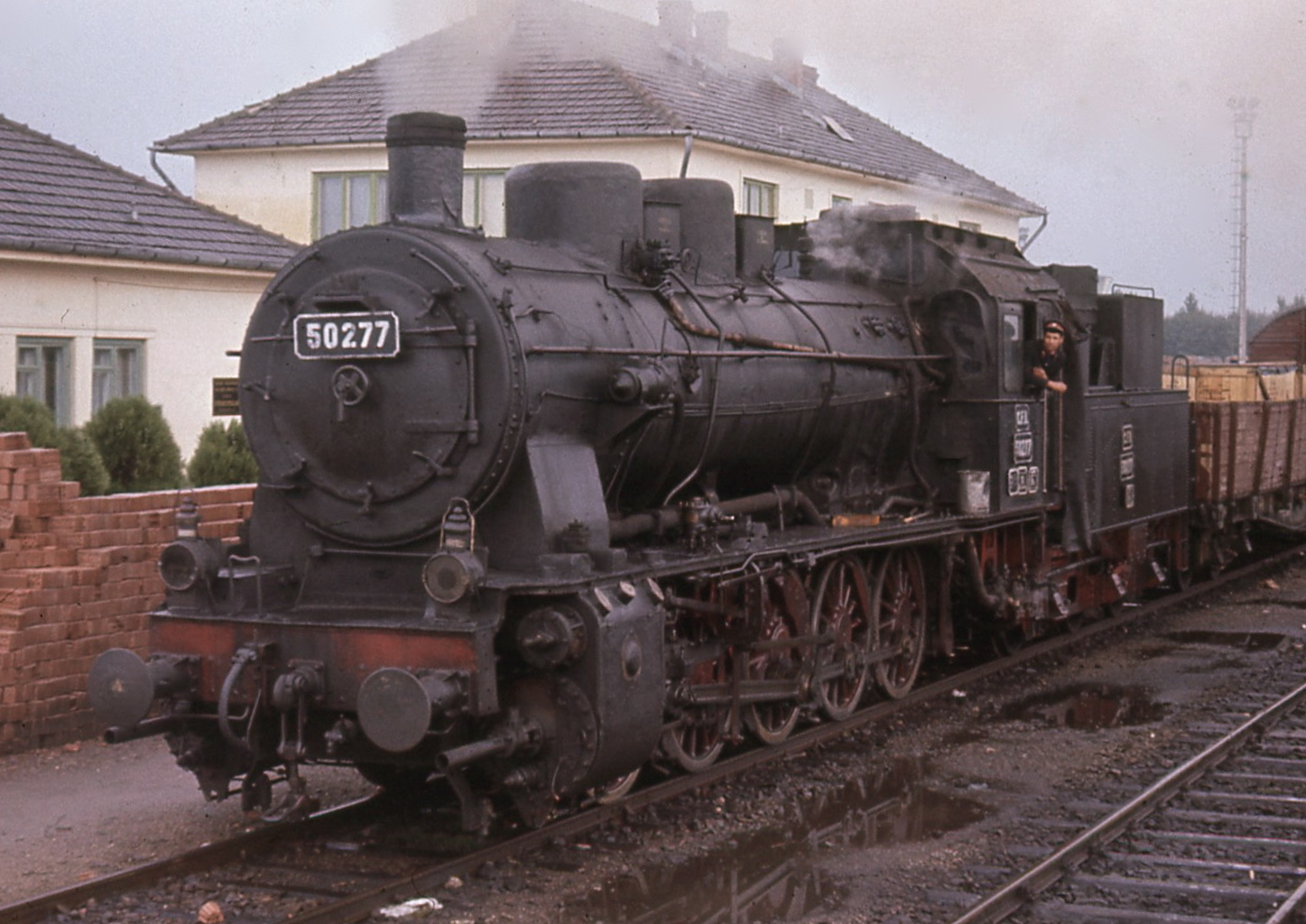
050 (Prussian G10) class, Romania's standard heavy shunter after World War II

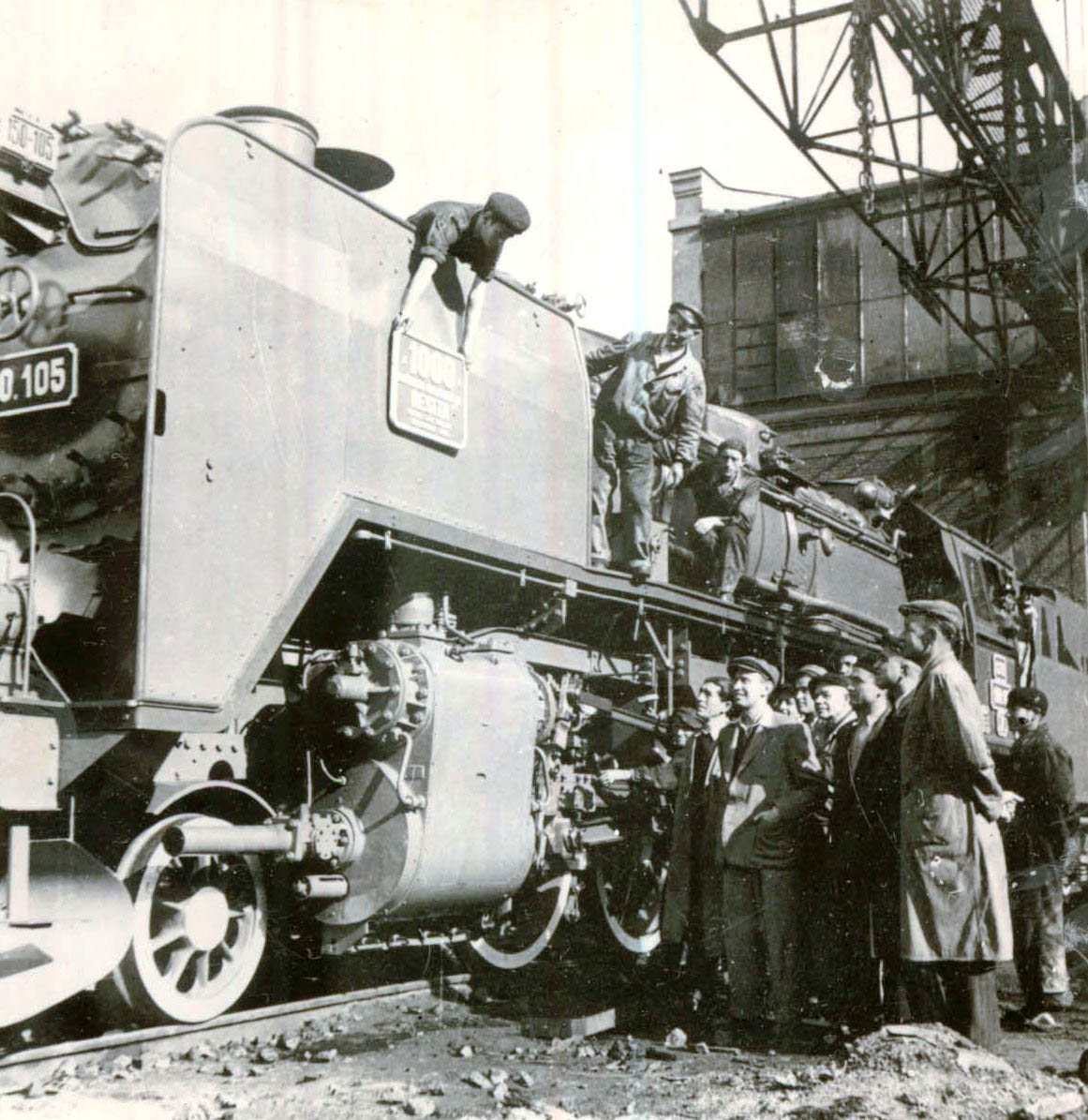
The 1,000th locomotive built in Reșița, 1955

After the war, Romania had lost Northern Bucovina and Bessarabia to the Soviet Union by July 1940, made final by the ratification of the Border agreement in 1947. Already in the Soviet sphere of influence, and after becoming a Communist republic in late December, there was significant interest to invest in expanding railways in the country. With the bulk of electrification and line doubling occurring during the communist period, it meant that railways had become to be seen as a symbol of rapid industrialisation under communist leaders Gheorghe Gheorghiu-Dej and Nicolae Ceaușescu.

=== Electrification and track doubling ===
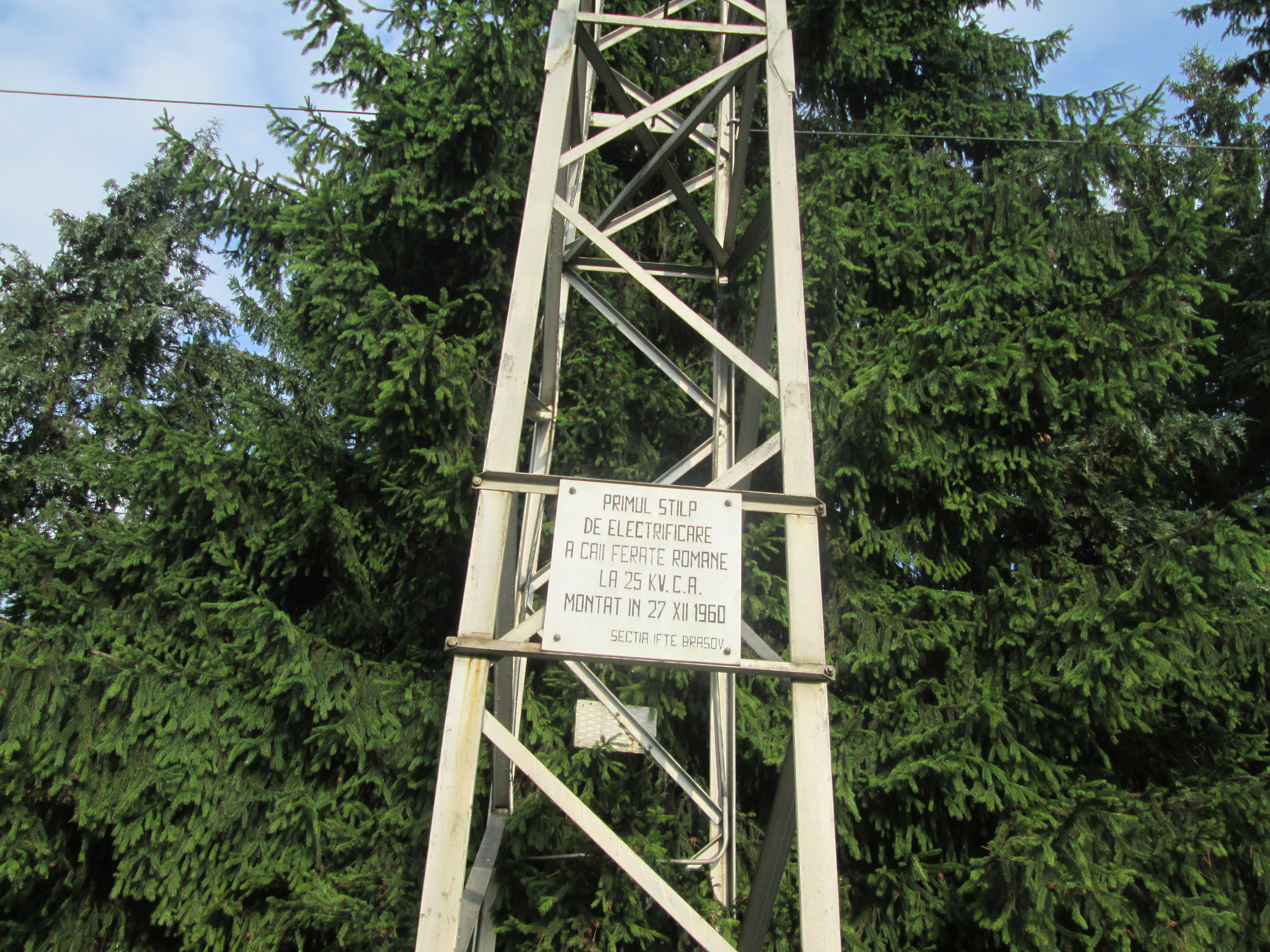
The first gantry to be mounted on the line at Predeal

The first standard gauge line to be electrified at 25 kV 50 Hz AC on the Romanian railway network was the heavily used Bucharest to Brașov line that had to deal with a quite challenging mountainous section. Works on electrification started on 27 December 1960 and the first electrified segment from Brașov to Predeal, opened on 9 December 1965. Tests on this section for electrical traction have been made with several locomotives of foreign origin, but the Swedish built Rb type locomotive, has been chosen to be the future backbone of CFR electric locomotive fleet. By 20 April 1966, a further segment was electrified, from Predeal to Câmpina, with the complete electrification of the line to be completed by 16 February 1969

Before the electrification of this standard gauge line, the 1000 mm Arad Vineyard Narrow Railroad line was electrified in 1913 at 1500V DC, while at the time being in the Austrian-Hungarian Empire until 1918, when it joined Romania. Between 1918 and until the forced nationalization of 1948 when it entered the patrimony of the state and under the administration of CFR it was run as a private enterprise.

Various lines were also supplemented with double tracks to permit increased traffic, including:

- Făurei - Galați (1971)
- Pantelimon - Cernavodă (1971)
- Bucharest - Roșiori - Craiova (1972)
- Chitila - Golești (1972)
- Brașov - Câmpul Libertății (1974)
- Adjud - Suceava (1975)
- Teiuș - Ilia (1978)

By the mid-1970s, steam traction disappeared completely out of mainstream use, being replaced by standardized diesel and electric locomotives and cars, most of built in Romania, at the Electroputere factory in Craiova, respectively Întreprinderea de Vagoane Arad (IVA) factory in Arad.

== CFR after 1989 ==
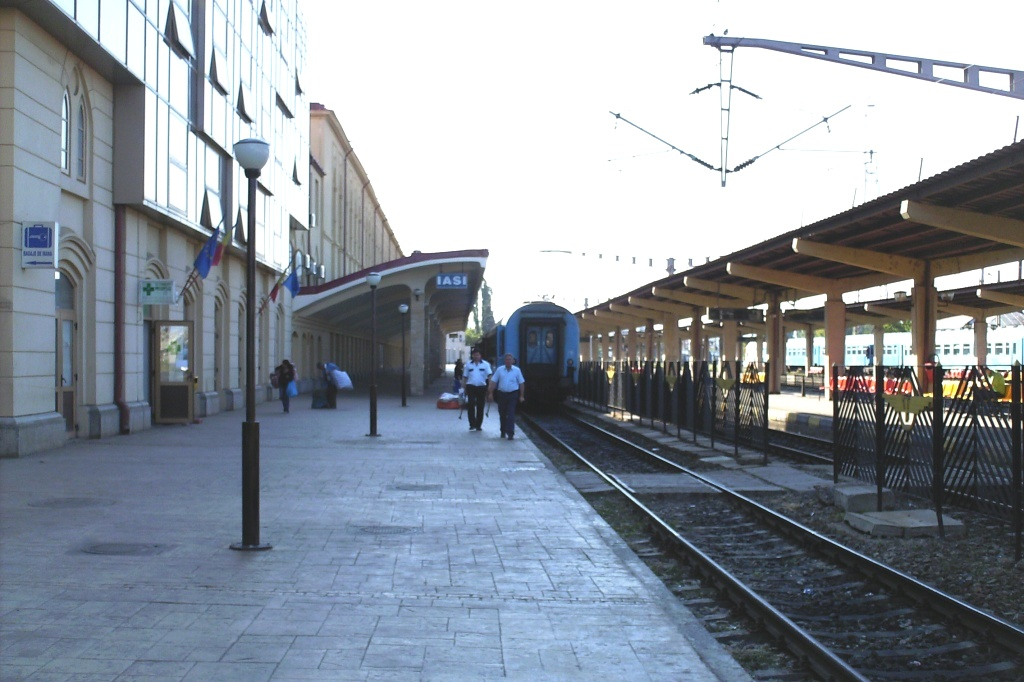
Iași railway station

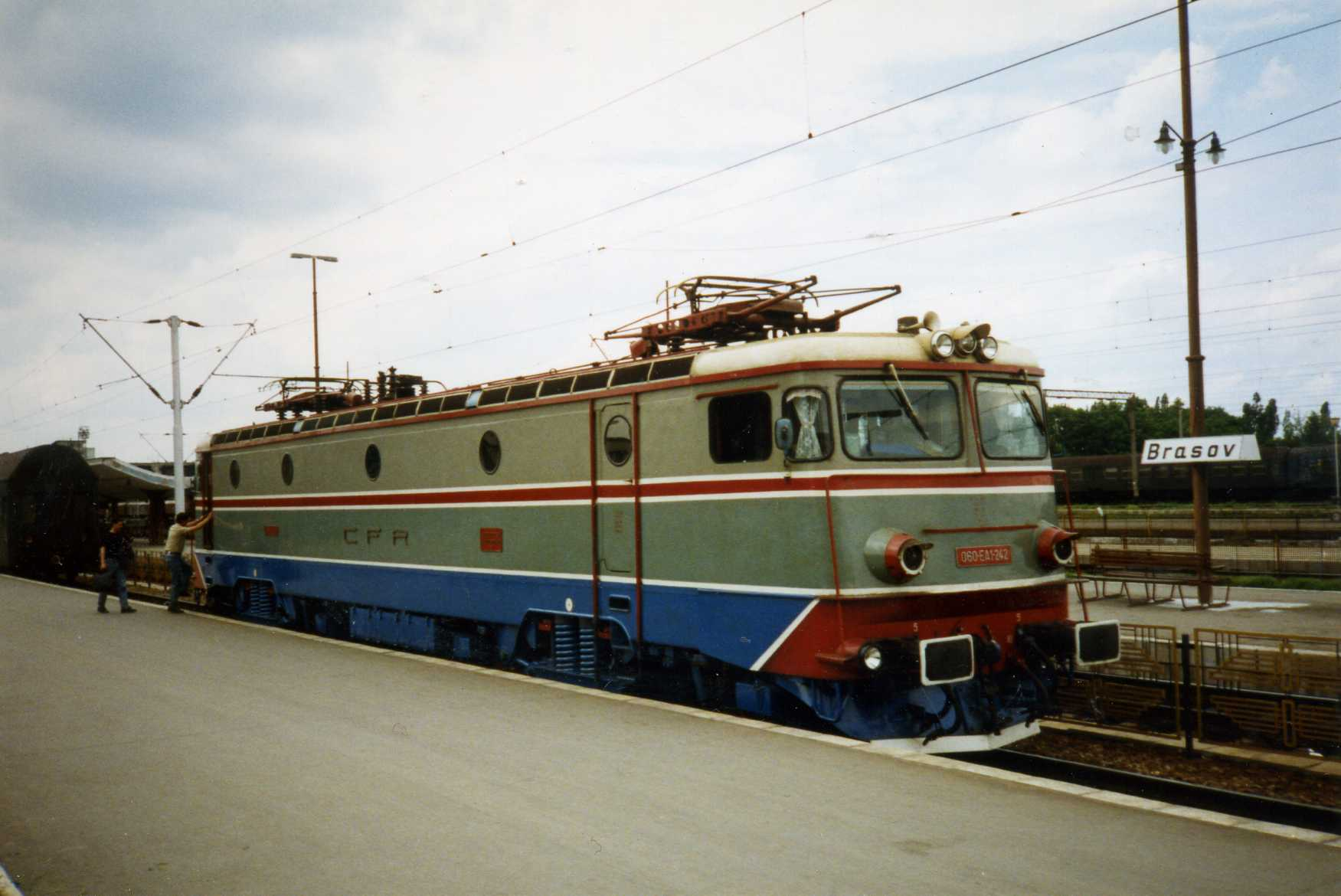
CFR electric locomotive 060-EA1-242 at Brașov railway station, May 1994

After the Romanian Revolution of 1989, which resulted in the fall of Communism, Romania was left with one of the largest, most dense and most frequently used railway networks in Europe; but at the same time having relatively outdated infrastructure. This, combined with the economic decline that Romania faced in the 1990s due to its transition to a market economy, resulted in CFR entering a period of relative decline. Several little-used routes, especially in rural areas, were cut back, and rolling stock, most of which was acquired in the 1970s, entered a period of disrepair. CFR's image, both domestically and abroad, suffered greatly, due to reports of dilapidated trains, poor service and general disarray of management.

This situation continued until the year 1998, when Societatea Națională a Căilor Ferate Române (The National Society of Romanian Railways) was split into five independently administered companies : Compania Națională de Căi Ferate "CFR" SA (National Railway Company "CFR" – dealing with infrastructure), CFR Călători (CFR Passenger Services – the operator of passenger trains), CFR Marfă (Freight transport company), CFR Gevaro (Services linked with restaurant cars) and SAAF (dealing with excess rolling stock to be sold, leased or scrapped).

Since 1989, a number of small branch lines have been closed— especially those designated for industrial purposes or having a narrow gauge. This has been generally done due to greater competition from private bus services as well as generally low passenger numbers on those lines. The narrow gauge line from Turda to Abrud, for example, could not hope to compete with the private car or bus, the journey time being just short of six and a half hours for the 93 kilometres (58 miles) trip (CFR Timetable 1988, table 309). As of 2022 the Turda–Abrud journey by bus takes 2 hours and 45 minutes.

Some other line closures were thought imminent especially on the branch lines in Timiș County, which were generally very old and little-used; but most seem to have been reprieved and now are operated by private operators. Between 1,000 and 1,500 km (620 and 930 mi) of railway lines have been divested of CFR control and a few have closed completely since 1990, most of which were in rural areas. Overall however, actual railway closures in Romania have been much less drastic than in other former Communist bloc countries, such as Hungary or Eastern Germany; indeed the "closure" figures given include lines which have been taken over by private operators and continue to operate (2010). Some standard gauge lines have in fact reopened since closure in the 1990s and some narrow-gauge tracks have recently been reopened by SFT (CFR's Railway Tourism Society) for tourism, but are only run occasionally, about twice a month (lines include Abrud-Câmpeni, Târgu Mureș-Band or Moldovița-Vama). All forestry railroads (căi ferate forestiere in Romanian) still in operation after 1989 have been privatized and sold to the forestry companies. Some, such as the Vasser Valley Scenic Railroad, have since become significant tourist attractions.

== Modernization ==
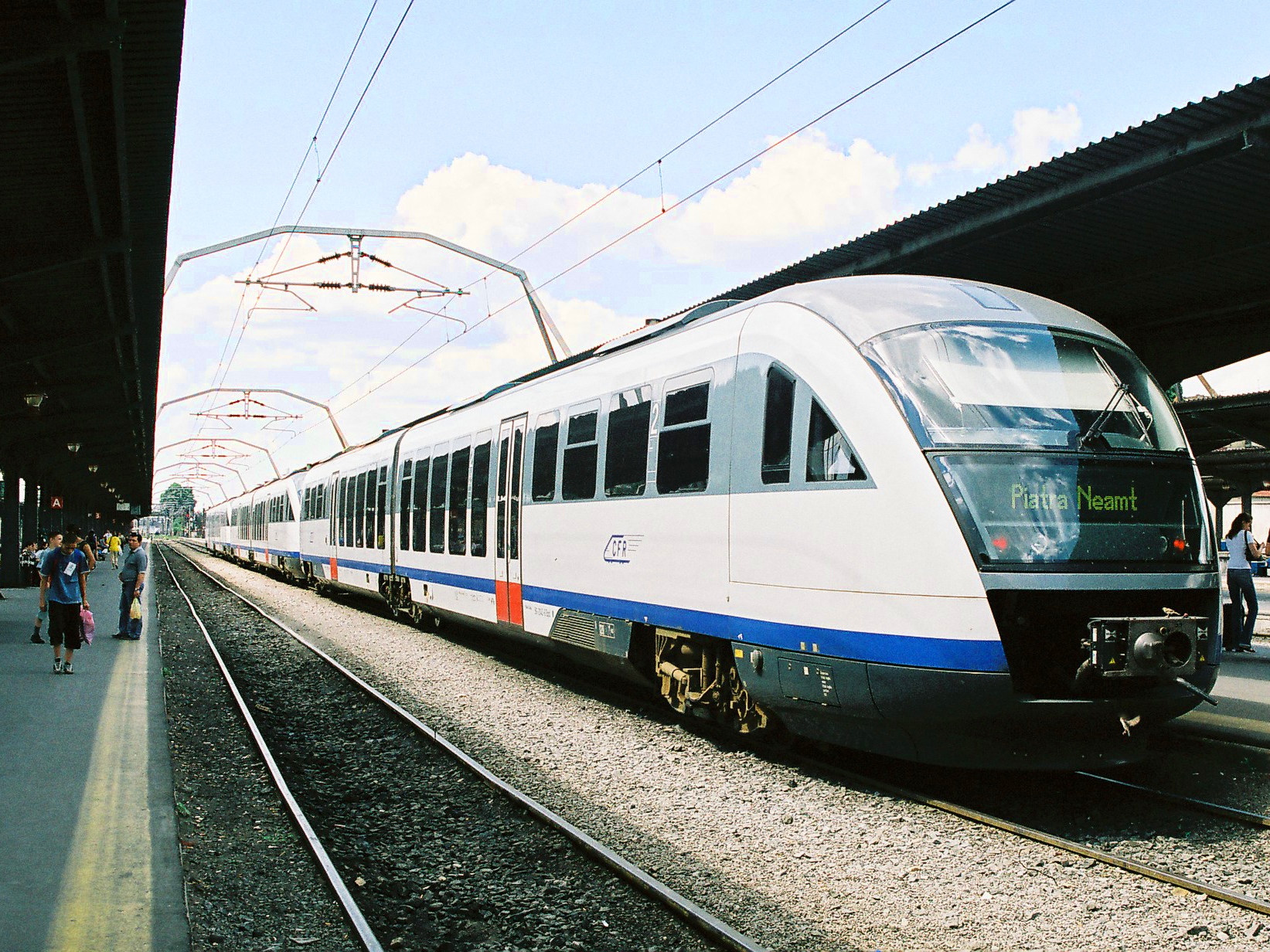
Siemens Desiro train at Bucharest North railway station, 2006

In the early 2000s, CFR began a modernization program to improve its image, which had been plagued both nationally and internationally by reports of poor service and outdated rolling stock. The first phases of the upgrade included the refurbishment of InterCity rolling stock, as well as the expansion of InterCity services.

To strengthen the growth of the Romanian InterCity network, CFR acquired in early 2003 several new Siemens Desiro train sets, some of which were assembled in Arad. Nicknamed "Săgeata Albastră" ("Blue Arrow"), they are used for short and medium distances. The Desiro DMUs were used as icons of the CFR's modernization, despite criticism that the CFR should not have used them on mainline express services, as they were designed for short-distance commuter rail, as seen by their hard seating, low speed and poor noise insulation. CFR responded to these criticisms by introducing a number of new Desiro trainsets in late 2004, which had better insulation and 70 seats instead of 110, thereby increasing the width and pitch of the seats. To this date, CFR continues to use Desiro trains on short and medium-distance routes, even though it has replaced them on several long-distance routes with other rolling stock.

In addition to the Desiro DMUs, CFR has purchased 80 new sleeping cars, couchettes and first and second class cars in recent years. The new sleeping cars provide improved passenger comfort, with air conditioning, LCD screens and modern showers in every compartment.

In addition to the improvements made to the railways, CFR has modernized several diesel and electric locomotives.

Part of CFR's modernization program is the XSELL project, which aims to introduce a Romania-wide electronic ticketing system. It was introduced at Bucharest North railway station in November 2004, and was later implemented at all major railway stations in Romania.

As of 1 September 2006, smoking is banned in all CFR trains.

CFR services continue to improve. However, some people expressed concern that CFR, which has yet to reach profitability, does not have the financial means to support an infrastructure upgrade.

Between 2001 and 2004, the Bucharest-Ploiești West-Câmpina section was rehabilitated, followed by the Câmpina-Sinaia-Predeal section between 2008/2009 and the end of 2011.

CFR initiated a major infrastructure project in April 2006 - the modernization of the Bucharest - Constanta line, in order to improve the maximum speed that can be reached on this line (from 140 km/h now, to 160 km/h in 2008). The completion date of this project was originally the second half of 2009, but the project had long delays, to be finally completed in the winter of 2011, although Ciulnița and Fetești railway stations were only partially modernized. The immediate consequence was the difficulty of moving on this route due to the works, the duration of a trip increasing by at least an hour and a half and leading to the dissatisfaction of travelers. But since 2012, when the works were officially completed, trains could run very fast, reducing journey times, reaching 160 km/h. Today, the only CFR railway where trains can run at 160 km/h is between Bucharest and Constanța in two hours.

== Passenger services ==
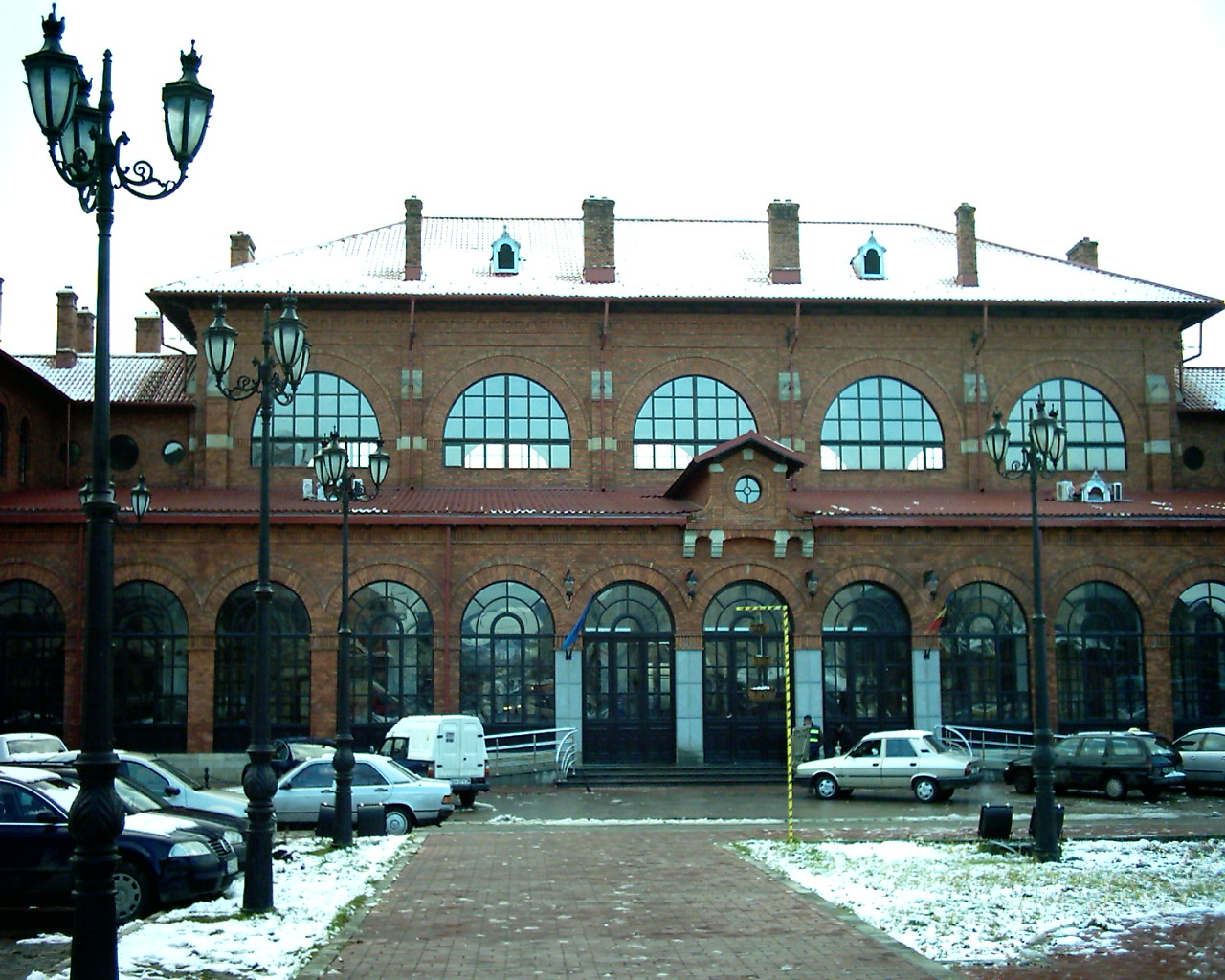
Burdujeni train station in Suceava

CFR Călători, the passenger service division of CFR, operates seven types of passenger train, both on Romania's territory, with rolling stock and locomotives, or internationally, with rolling stock. Also, CFR operates international trains on Romanian territory with its own locomotives. The train types vary in terms of speed and type of rolling stock.

In 2015, approximately 55 million passenger journeys were made with the company. In the same time 12 million further journeys were made using the private operators.

The CFR train types are:

- Regio (R) – the trains have assigned numbers from 2000 to 9999.
- InterRegio (IR) – the trains have assigned numbers from 200 to 499, 600 to 999, 1000 to 1999 and 10000 to 16999.
- InterCity (IC) – numbered from 500 to 599, discontinued in December 2014 but reintroduced on 10 December 2023.

=== Regio trains ===
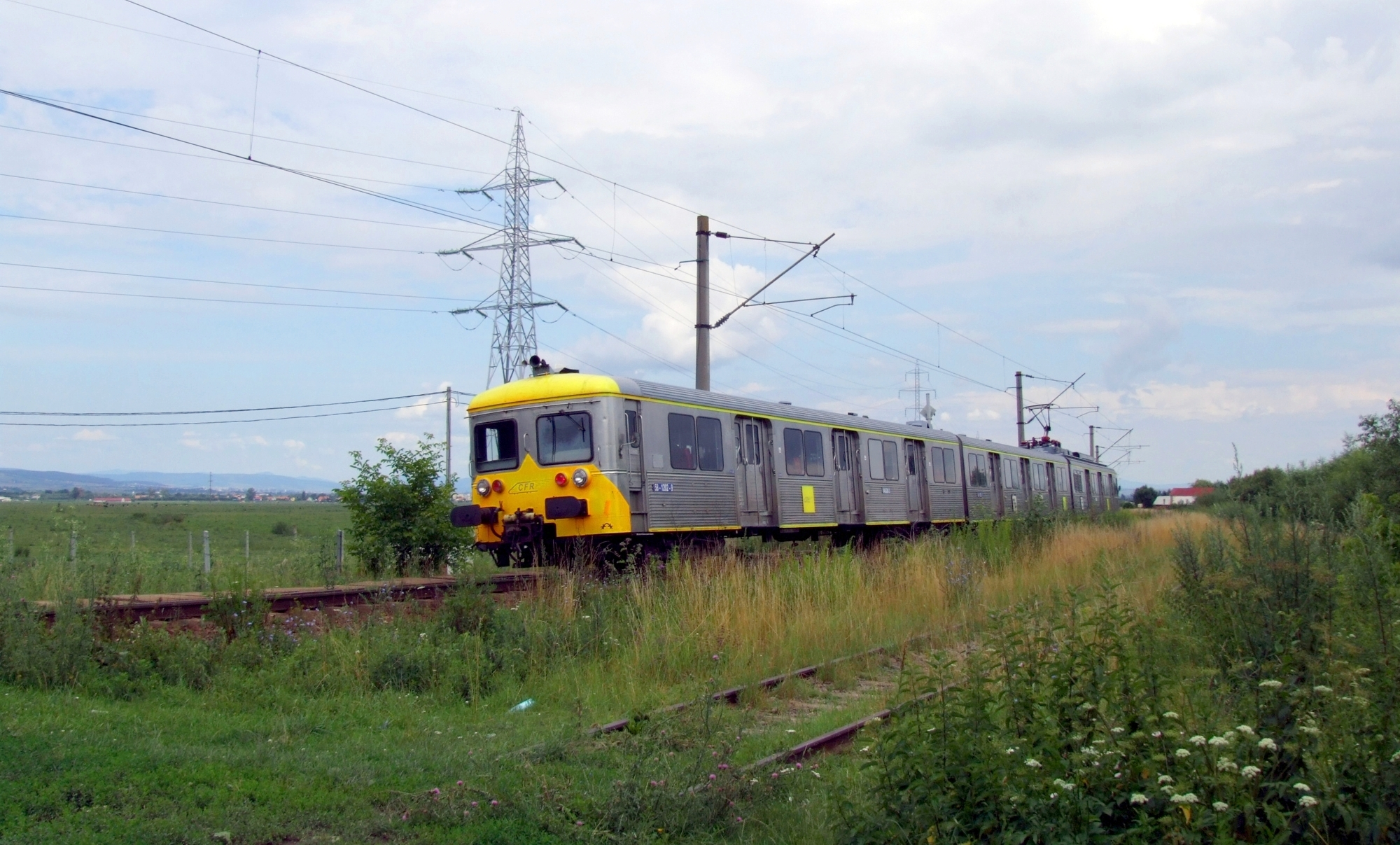
Regio train in Prejmer

Regio trains (regional), formerly Local (Romanian: "Personal") trains (until December 2011), also termed commuter trains (navete or trenuri de navetiști), are the most abundant type of trains on the CFR passenger network. They are used for two main purposes, as shuttle, or commuter, trains, linking towns with neighbouring villages, and linking neighbouring cities with each other.

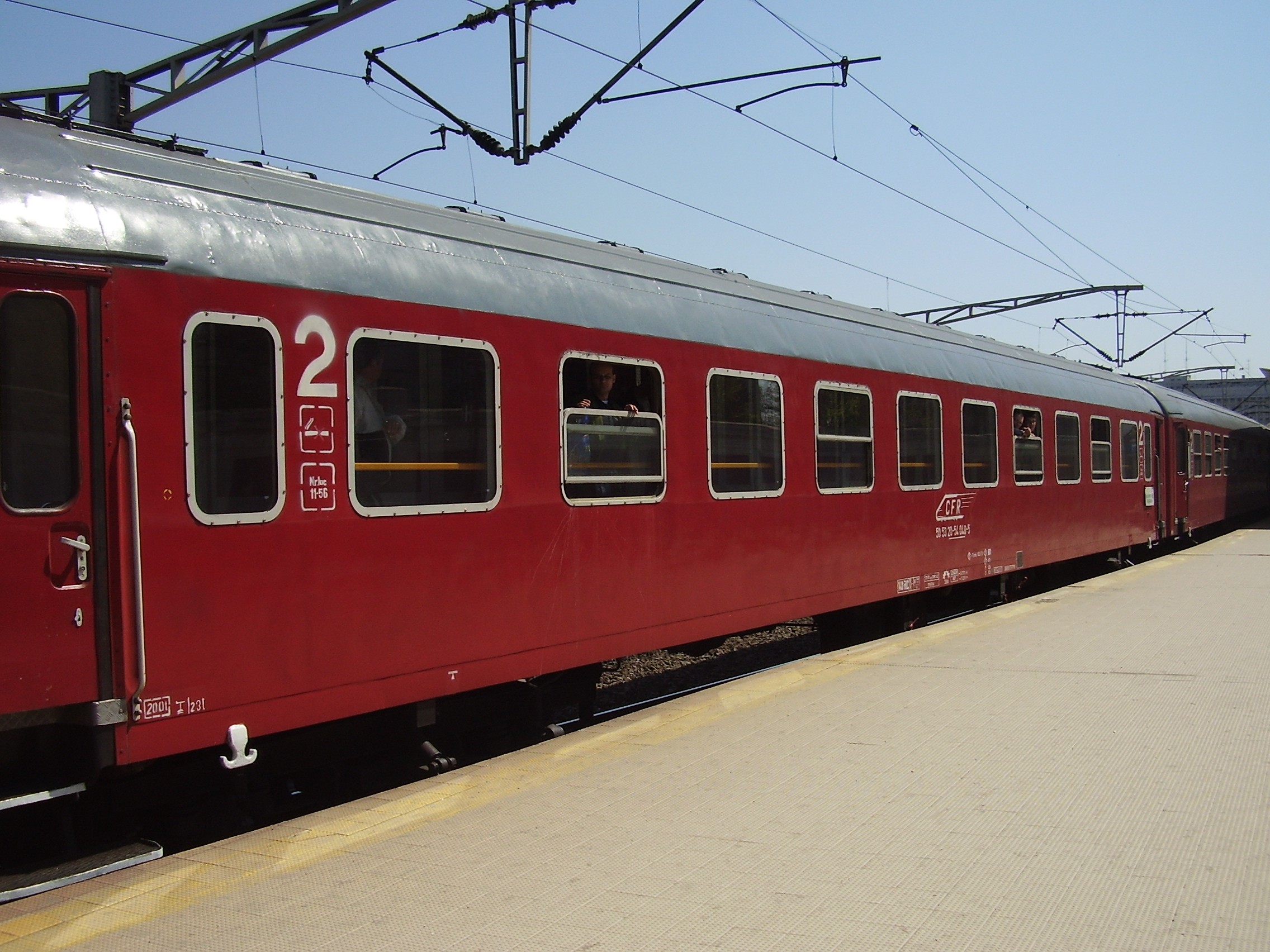
Series 20–54 wagon used for regional trains

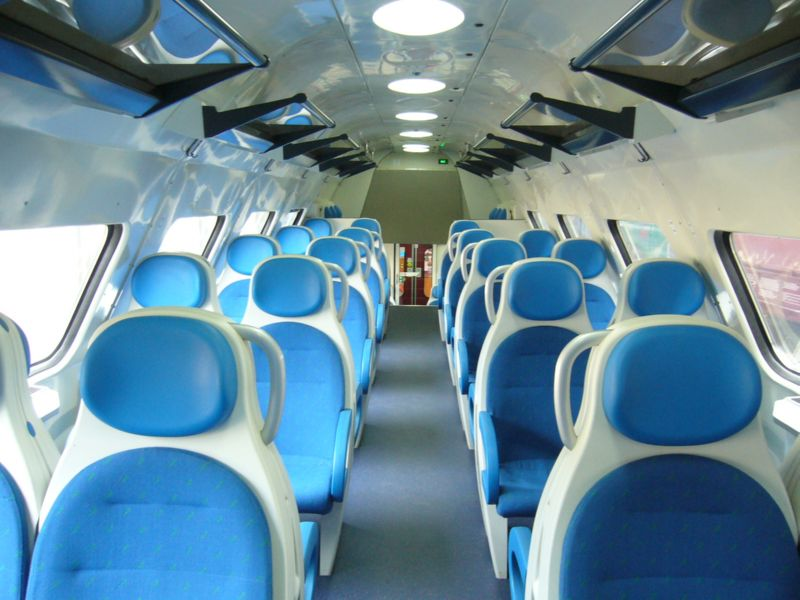
Interior from series 26/36/84–16 bilevel wagon for regional trains

Local trains (now Regio), have the lowest average speed (34.3 km/h in 2004) and the least comfortable (usually oldest) rolling stock, and have a reputation for being very slow, crowded and generally unkempt which is only gradually changing. Regio trains operate mostly on local routes and stop at every station. Train fares for this type are the cheapest, since no supplement is paid, only the base fare, based on distance. Seats are not reservable. The rolling stock on Regio trains differs widely. On routes that link neighbouring cities with each other (such as Bucharest and Pitești), the quality of the rolling stock is much better than those services which provide a shuttle link between cities and rural areas (such as the Timișoara-Berzovia line).

Most Regio rolling stock consist of compartment single level and open-plan double-decker cars. As of 2007, most Regio trains, especially on rural routes, have only 2nd class cars. The livery of most Regio cars is painted in the color scheme of CFR Calatori (blue and grey), with the rolling stock built in the 1970s and 1980s. Some very short rural routes in Romania's Bukovina region use rolling stock from the 1940s and 1950s, refitted with bus seats and operating like railbuses. CFR is refurbishing a range of double-decker Local (Regio) cars, that will be used on Local and Accelerat trains. The refurbished cars, painted in the same livery as the old ones, have been introduced since 2003, and are cleaner, although they still use most of the old fittings. Exceptions to this widespread use of older rolling stock for Local trains is found on some routes (such as Sibiu–Craiova) that are operated using Desiro trainsets, and some others are operated using modernized electric trainsets.

The new private operators also use the term Regio using mainly (refurbished) railbuses.

=== InterRegio trains ===
InterRegional trains (IR), formerly Accelerat and Rapid trains (until December 2011), are used for medium and long-distance services that stop only in towns or cities. InterRegional trains have higher speeds. They are also more expensive, requiring the payment of a supplement alongside the base fee. Some services of the InterRegional type require a reservation. InterRegional trains are also used for cross-regional long-distance routes (for example, Timișoara to Bucharest). Despite the long distances, InterRegional trains tend to stop in every town (even though they bypass villages) and hence are very popular, though they are seldom used for express travel between two large cities.

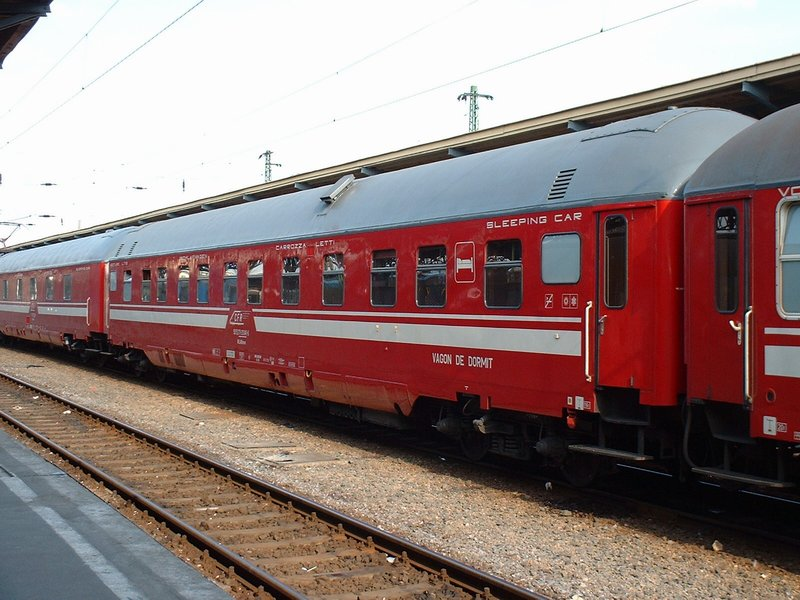
Sleeping car of the Romanian Railways, seen at Budapest Keleti in 2004

Since 2009, the InterRegio 1821/1822 from Arad to Constanța via Deva, Tîrgu Jiu, Craiova and Bucharest also travels to Constanța with an extra sleeperette car and sleeper car. The InterRegio rolling stock is formed of both single-decker cars painted in the painting scheme of CFR Calatori (blue and gray). Single-decker cars are all corridor-type, with the old cars having 8 seats per compartment in second class and 6 in first class whereas the new cars have 6 seats per compartment regardless of class (this type of coaches are used now for Regio Trains and rarely on InterRegio Trains). Double-decker cars have 4 seats per row in an open plan.

In early 2005, CFR introduced a new double-decker car for medium-distance, highly used Interregional routes such as Bucharest–Predeal. Siemens Desiro trainsets have also been introduced on medium-distance InterRegional routes in Transylvania and Moldavia (Iași–Vatra Dornei). Longer-distance InterRegional trains often have couchettes, and sleepers started to be added again to consists after a lengthy absence. Dining cars are never used on these trains. In the 2010 schedule, many short and medium distance routes (such as Bucharest–Craiova, Bucharest–Râmnicu Vâlcea–Sibiu, Bucharest–Tulcea, Craiova–Sibiu, Timișoara–Sibiu, Cluj-Napoca–Timișoara) were served by modernized double-decker cars or Desiro trainsets. Some long-distance trains (Bucharest–Timișoara, Bucharest–Târgu Jiu–Arad, Bucharest–Cluj-Napoca–Satu Mare, Bucharest–Iași, Bucharest–Vatra Dornei, Iași–Timișoara, Sighetu Marmației–Bucharest) also use modernized Rapid-style cars.

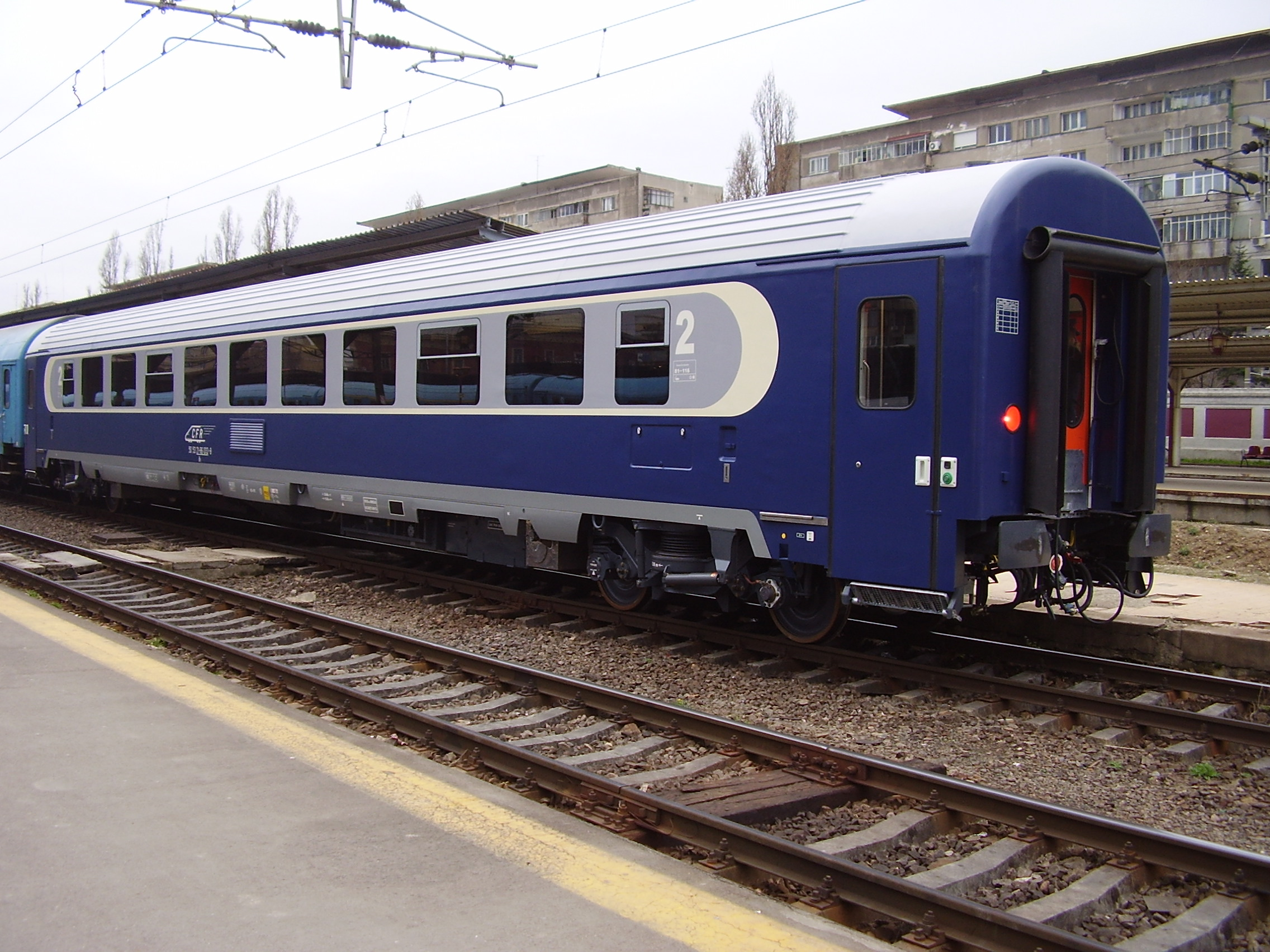
Series 21–86 wagon, used for InterRegio trains

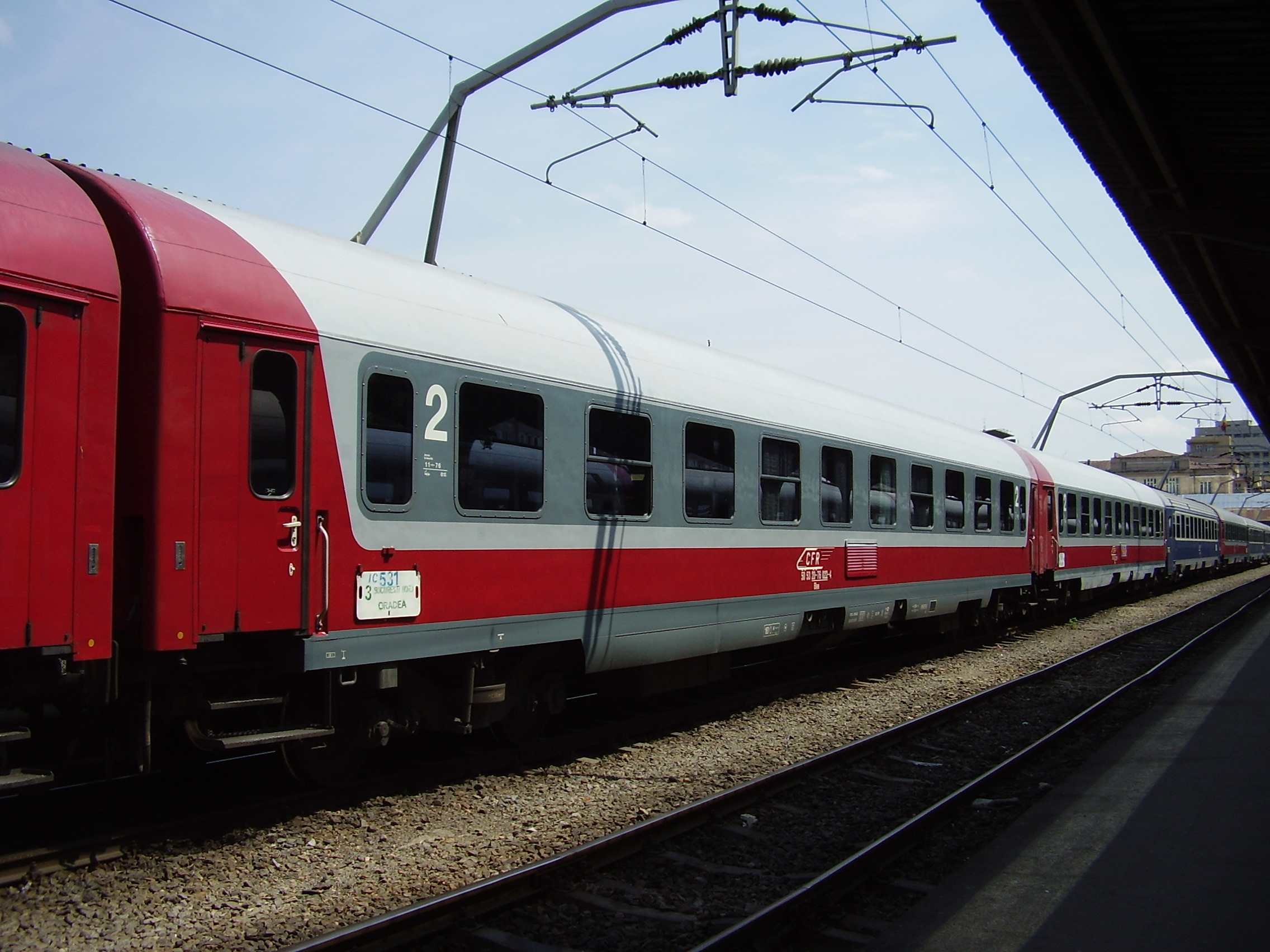
Series 20–76 wagon, used for Regio and InterRegio trains

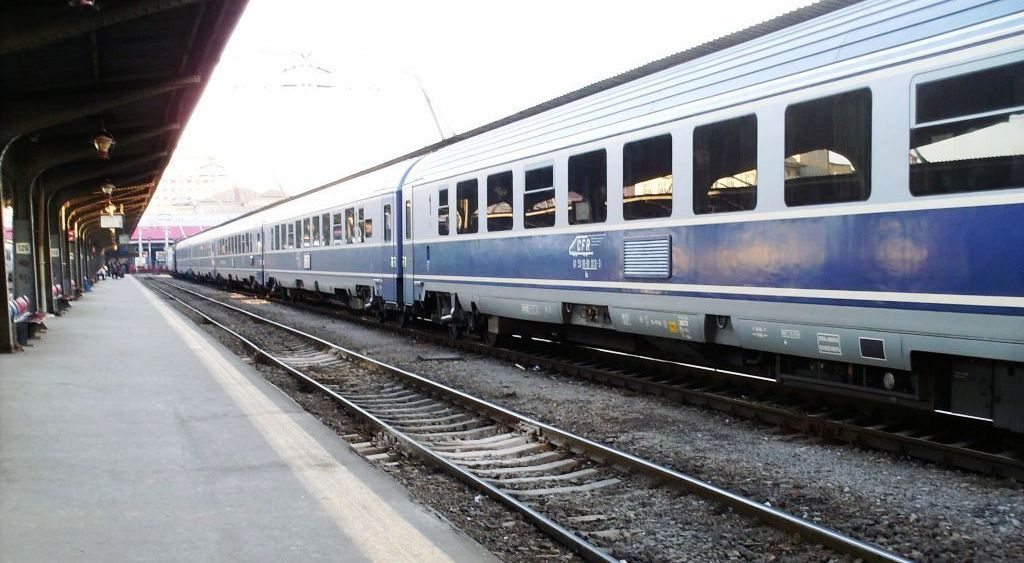
InterRegio train in Bucharest North Station (2010)

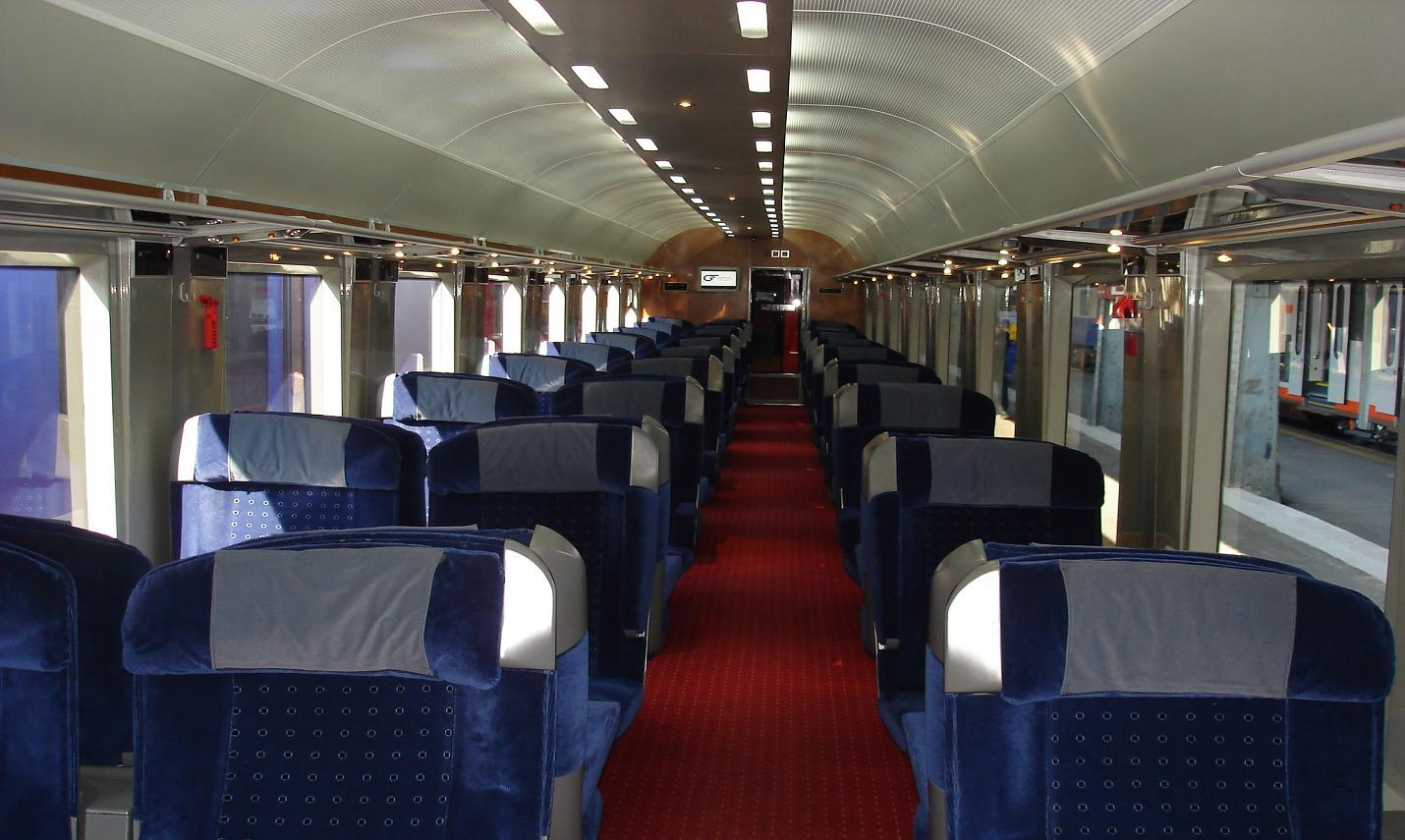
The interior of a coach used for InterRegio trains

Rolling stock on InterRegional trains has recently been the object of CFR's modernisation plan. Various series of cars have been refurbished, and fitted with air-conditioning, ecological toilets, etc. However, a small and rapidly declining number of Rapid rolling stock, mainly on lesser-used routes, remains fairly aged and outdated. As of 2004, Siemens Desiro DMUs have been introduced on medium-distance Rapid routes. Most Rapid rolling stocks are painted in the painting scheme of CFR Călători (blue and gray). All cars are uncompartmented and are usually air-conditioned. Sleepers, couchettes and dining-cars are available on most long routes.

- From Sighetu Marmației the Rapid train needs over 21 hours to complete the 850 km (530 mi) trip.
- From Satu Mare nearly 22 hours to complete the 928 km (577 mi) trip.
- From Oradea over 19 hours to complete the 913 km (567 mi) trip
- From Timișoara Nord over 15 hours to complete the 795 km (494 mi) trip.

=== InterCity ===
InterCity (IC) is CFR's premier train type and is used for daytime express services between major cities, as well as shuttle services between Bucharest and the Black Sea coast and the Carpathian mountain resorts. InterCity trains typically only stop in large cities (generally of over 100,000 inhabitants). InterCity trains are the fastest out of all the train types, having an average speed of 87 km/h (54 mph) in 2004, and also use the most modern and comfortable rolling stock, rivaling the premier services of other European carriers. Due to this, InterCity prices include a significant supplement alongside the base fee.

The InterCity rolling stock is either new or refurbished (all IC rolling stock was built after 1995), with air-conditioning, power-plugs (in both 1st and 2nd class carriages) and plush bucket armchairs, as well as complimentary newspapers, free meals and airplane-like service in first class. These trains generally have a reputation for their high levels of comfort, cleanliness and service. The InterCity standard livery was usually grey and blue, especially in the case of the C160-class rolling stock, which is the newest type. Most InterCity rolling stock is open plan (no compartments). When CFR bought the Desiro DMUs, they were mostly used for InterCity trains, but due to complaints related to their comfort levels, they were replaced with standard cars for most routes and now the Desiro DMUs are used for the Regio trains.

Express passenger and international IC services, such as the Bucharest-Constanța route, use the Romanian-built Astra AVA-200 cars, which have a maximum speed of 200 km/h (120 mph) and are the most comfortable rolling stock in the CFR fleet. In fact, according to Friends of CFR, a Romanian railway journal, there was a considerable downgrading in quality when the Bucharest–Vienna IC service switched from being operated by CFR to being run by Austrian Railways (ÖBB) in 2003, leading to numerous complaints that the route should revert to CFR cars instead of Austrian ÖBB cars.

Beginning with December 2006, the company introduced the business service on certain IC routes (București Nord–Timișoara Nord, București Nord–Oradea). These wagons were refurbished by CFR Grivița and they provided two classes: standard and standard exclusive. According to class, these rail cars provide leather or fabric-covered armchairs, monitors, individual displays for every seat, 4 channel audio system with earphones, wireless internet access, bar, air conditioning, and they were equipped with an elevator for disabled travellers. As of 1 June 2014, InterCity trains used to operate on the following routes:

Route	Rolling stock	
Route	Classic	Siemens Desiro
Bucharest – Iași (Now InterRegio)	Yes	
Bucharest – Bacău – Suceava (Now InterRegio)	Yes	
Bucharest – Brăila – Galați (Now InterRegio)	Yes	
Bucharest – Brașov – Alba Iulia – Arad(EuroCity with InterRegio fares to Budapest-346 Dacia train or 472 Ister train)	Yes	
Bucharest – Brașov – Cluj-Napoca (Branch of the Trains which run to Budapest)	Yes	
Bucharest – Brașov – Miercurea Ciuc – Târgu Mureș (Now InterRegio)	Yes	
Timișoara - Cluj Napoca (Now InterRegio)		Yes

Before early 2003, there was also a train type known as InterCityExpress (ICE), which ran from Bucharest to Constanța, but these have been discontinued and transformed into IC and later into IR, while maintaining the same rolling stock.

Due to poor infrastructure and high fares, InterCity trains are no longer in use as of 2015. Some trains continue to run like InterCity but have InterRegio fares. The rolling stock used before 2015 for Intercity trains is now used for InterRegio trains.

=== Speeds ===
The speed limit for express passenger trains in Romania is 160 km/h (99 mph). All other trains have a general speed limit of 120 km/h (75 mph). Average operating speeds (including all stops in stations) according to CFR, are in 2018:

- 39 km/h for Regio trains
- 55 km/h for InterRegio trains

The longest train route, as of 2005, is the one between Iași, in the north-east, and Timișoara, in the west, which takes 18 hours with an Interregio train to complete. For example, the journey between Suceava Burdujeni and Bucharest is 447 km, and takes approximately 5–6 hours to complete at an average speed of 80 km/h.

== Freight services ==
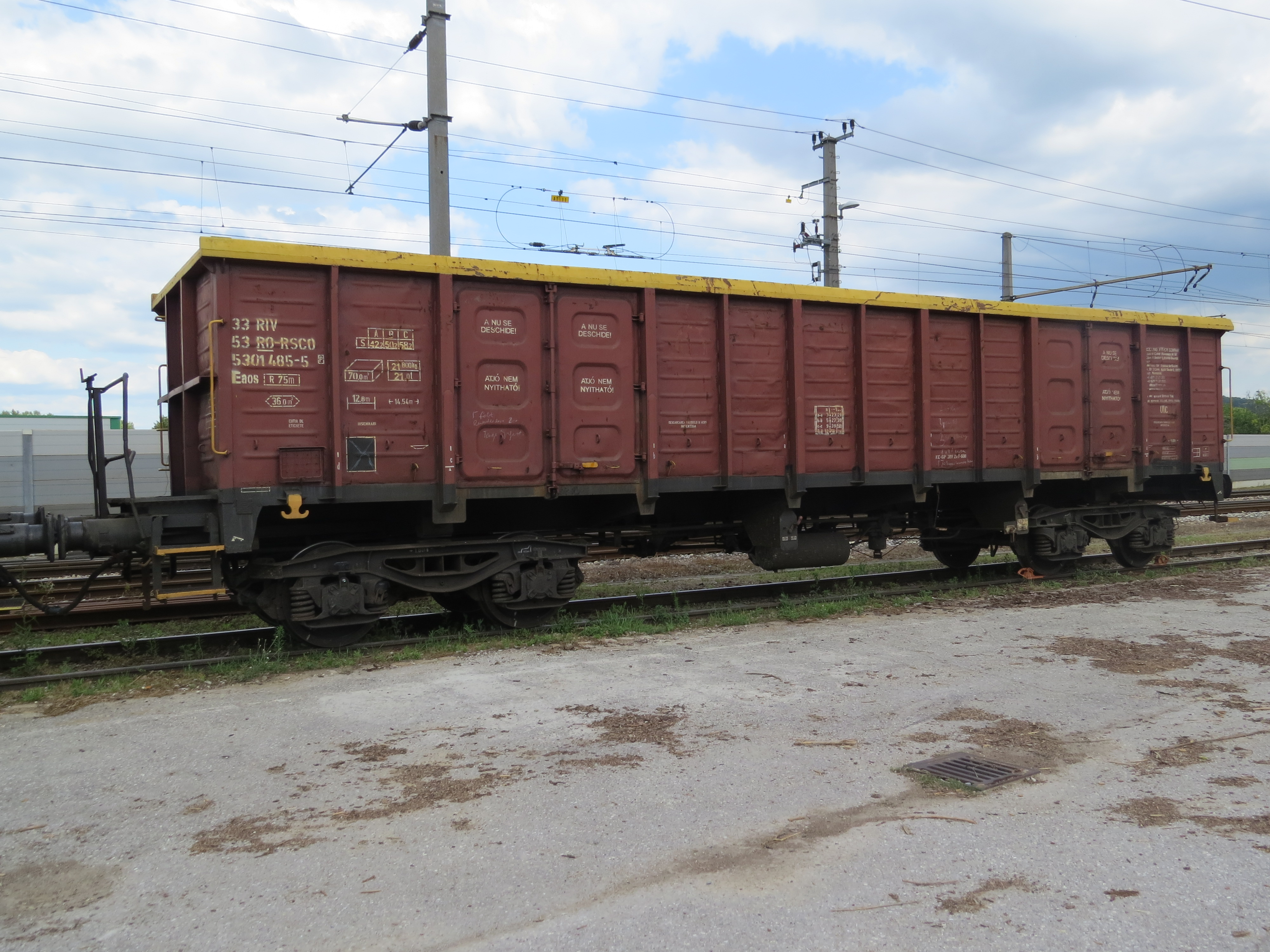
Freight wagon 33 53 5301 485–5 at Bahnhof Herzogenburg in Austria.

Freight services in Romania are operated mostly by CFR Marfă, the freight division of CFR, as well as by 28 other private companies who operate on lines leased from CFR Infrastructură. The CFR Marfă fleet is made up of 987 locomotives, most of which were built in Romania or the former Yugoslavia. The fact that rail freight remains maintains a strong market share in Romania, as well as a number of efficiency reforms, has led CFR Marfă to perform quite well financially in recent years, even though it remains loss-making. In 2003, the CFR Marfă's net loss was 8.8 million new lei (approximately US$3 million), reduced from 141.5 million new lei in 2002.

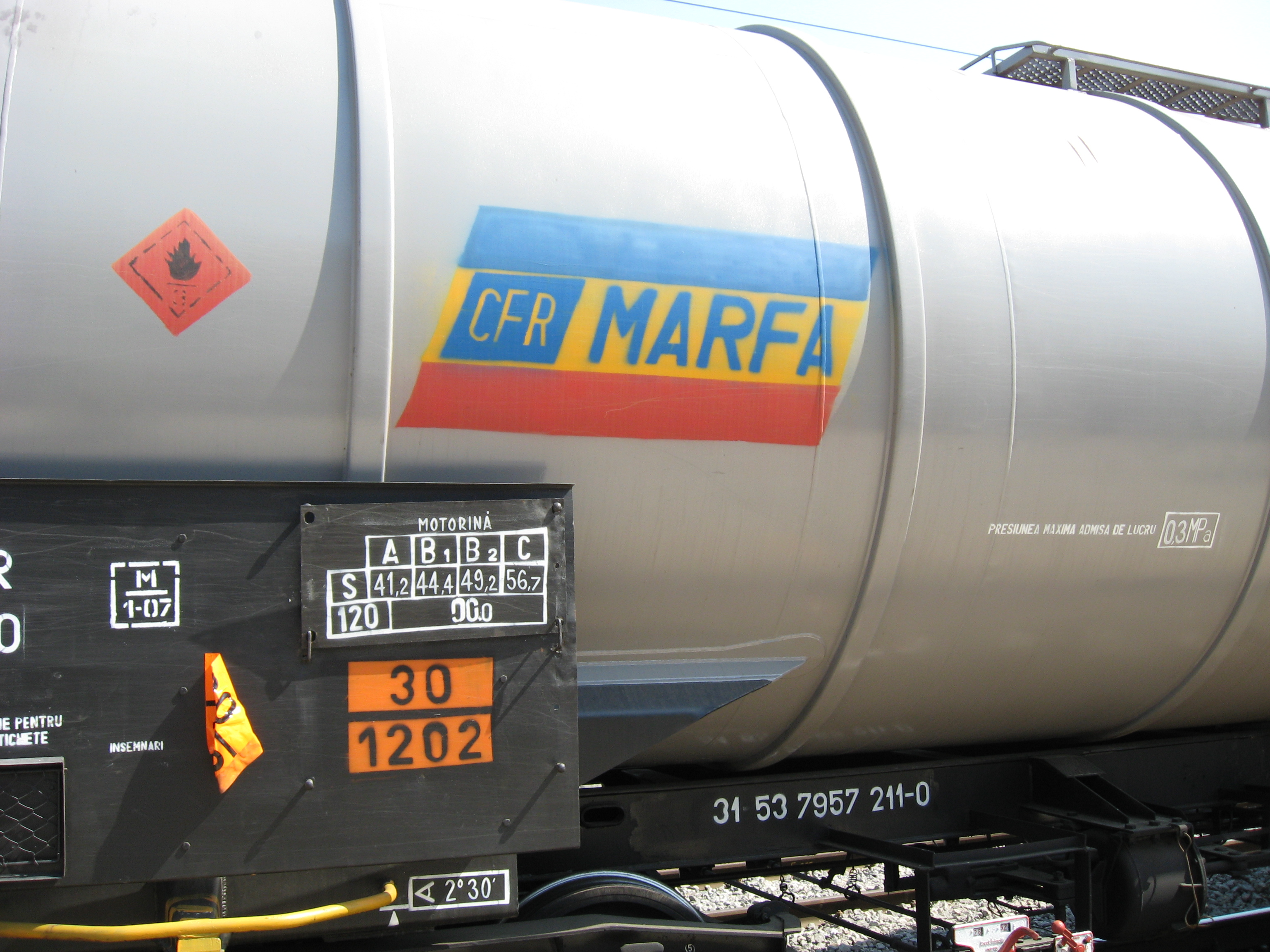
CFR Marfă freight train contains diesel product

Main groups of goods carried on CFR Marfă services (2004)
Type of goods	%
Coal	39.5
Oil products	10.9
Quarry and ballast products	3.8
Common metals and common metal articles	12.4
Cement	2.7
Ore	4.0
Agricultural products	3.6
Chemicals	4.2
Other	18.9
Source: "Statistici". CFR Marfă.

Freight trains follow the same speed limits to those issued for passenger trains, although hazardous materials, explosive, nuclear, flammable, chemical or otherwise dangerous trains have a special regime. Most locomotives have a physical speed limit of 160 or 120 km/h, but freight trains are not usually running at speeds exceeding 100 km/h.

== Main lines ==
Line	Route
Line 200	Brașov–Sibiu–Vințu de Jos–Deva–Arad–Curtici
Line 300	Bucharest–Ploiești–Brașov–Sighișoara–Câmpia Turzii–Cluj-Napoca–Oradea–Episcopia Bihor
Line 400	Brașov–Sfântu Gheorghe–Toplița–Deda–Saratel–Dej–Jibou–Baia Mare–Satu Mare–Halmeu
Line 500	Bucharest–Ploiești–Buzău–Focșani–Bacău–Roman–Suceava–Vicșani
Line 600	Făurei–Tecuci–Bârlad–Vaslui–Iași–Ungheni
Line 700	Bucharest–Urziceni–Făurei–Brăila–Galați
Line 800	Bucharest–Fetești–Cernavodă–Constanța–Mangalia
Line 900	Bucharest–Craiova–Drobeta-Turnu Severin–Caransebeș–Lugoj–Timișoara–Stamora Moravița

== Locomotives and stock ==
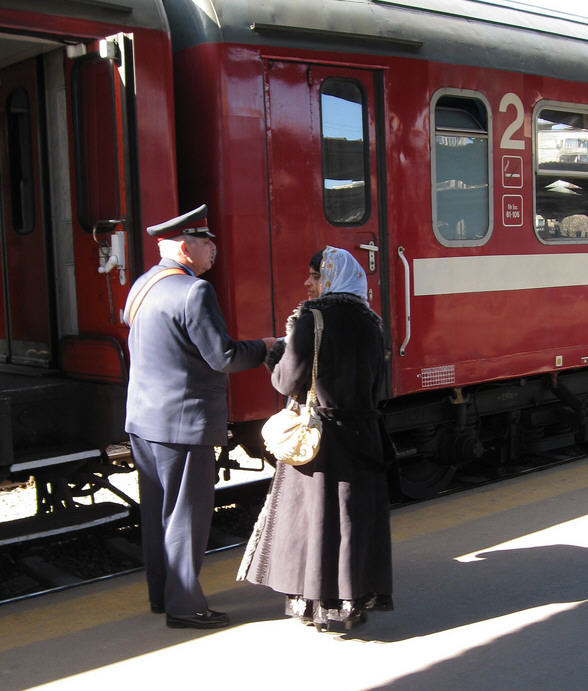
A CFR conductor ("ceferist") helping a passenger at Gara de Nord, February 2008.

CFR Călători (passenger services) and CFR Marfă (freight services) use a range of electric (known as LE), diesel electric (LDE), diesel hydraulic (LDH) and diesel mechanical (LDM/LDMM) locomotives. SFT (tourist railways division) uses steam locomotives (both narrow gauge and standard gauge) and diesel mechanical locomotives.

Each of the four CFR divisions have their own locomotives, and these are generally not interchanged. For example, a CFR Marfă locomotive should not be used to pull a CFR Călători train. In practice however, this rule does not hold, and frequently the companies use other rolling stock through informal lease agreements. Moreover, private companies' rolling stock is used at times, usually because of emergencies (such as a locomotive breaking down and requiring a replacement to keep the line open, and an unused private locomotive being closer).

=== Electric locomotives ===
Most of the electric locomotives employed by CFR were built by Electroputere Craiova (known as EA-type) and Rade Končar Zagreb (known as EC-type). All are built for 1,435 mm (4 ft 8 1/2 in) standard gauge and run using a catenary wire at 25 kV 50 Hz AC. All trains have electric heating. CFR owns 1,066 electric locomotives, 933 of which were built by Electroputere (Class 40, 41, 42) and 133 built by Končar (Class 43, 44, 46).

Name	Builder	Specifications and notes	Maximum speed	Years built
Class 40	Electroputere	5100 kW Co'Co' axle formula	120 km/h	1965–1991
Class 41	Electroputere	5100 kW Co'Co' axle formula	160 km/h	1966–1991
Class 42	Electroputere	5100 kW Co'Co' axle formula. Only 1 was built, for speed tests.	200 km/h	1977
Class 43	Končar	3400 kW Bo'Bo' axle formula	120 km/h	1973–1984
Class 44	Končar	3400 kW Bo'Bo' axle formula	160 km/h	1973–1984
Class 45	Electroputere – Siemens	5100 kW Co'Co' axle formula. Heavily modernised class 41 locomotives, with new bogies, gears, control systems and brakes. First CFR locomotives to use computerised traction control. 24 were in service, with 20 being converted from class 41.	160 km/h	1999–2000
Class 46	Končar and Softronic	3840 kW Bo'Bo' axle formula heavily modernised class 43/44 locomotives.	160 km/h	1999–2001 2007–2011
Class 47	Electroputere – Softronic (subclasses 476 and 477 - "Delfin" and 473 - Softronic Phoenix, for passengers) – Promat (subclasses 470, 474, for freight)	6600 kW Co'Co' axle formula, modernized from class 40 and 41 for heavy loads.	120 km/h (subclasses 470, 474); 160 km/h (subclasses 473, 476, 477)	2006–present
Class 48	Softronic	8200 kW Co'Co' axle formula Softronic Transmontana locomotive.	160 km/h	2010–present
Class 50	Unknown	2900 kW Co'Co' axle formula Ex. CFR Class 70/71 built for freight traffic. Only 1 was made, called 50-001-3	120 km/h	1994
Class 188	Alstom	6000 kW Bo'Bo' axle formula	200 km/h	2025–2026

=== Diesel locomotives ===
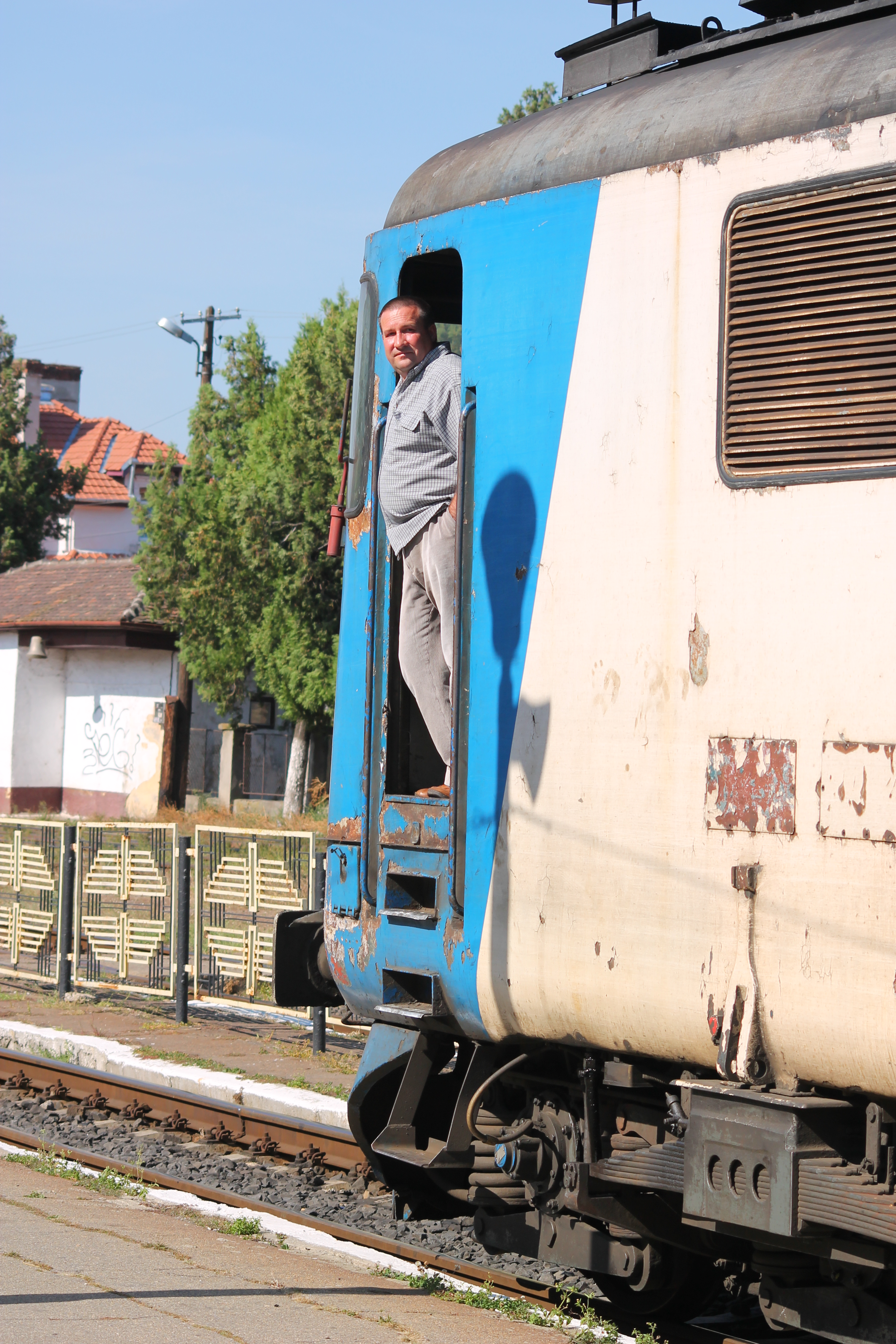
Train driver of Class 60 in Sibiu

CFR's diesel locomotives have been built by Electroputere Craiova (classes 60 to 68) and FAUR Bucharest (classes 69 to 95).

Classes 60 and 62 have as prime mover a twin-bank cylinder Sulzer 12LDA28 diesel engine rated at 2100 hp@750rpm, being derated from its nominal power by a smaller turbocharger and a lower max rpm. The difference between classes 60 and 62 is that the class 62 features traction motors certified and capable of pulling passenger coaches at 120 km/h instead of the 100 km/h allowed for class 60.

Classes 63 and 65 are modified by replacing Sulzer engines with 2 stroke 8 cylinders EMD 8-710G which develop 2150 hp at crankshaft at 900 rpm, the generators were replaced with alternators and DC traction motors were replaced with new ones. Class 63 has a max speed of 120 km/h while class 65 is limited to 100 km/h. 63 and 65 are in service for CFR Călători only for passenger coaches' traction. 63 and 65 do not feature Dynamic Braking Systems available in North America.

The following classes are in service:

Name	Type	Specifications and notes	Maximum speed	Years built
Class 60	Diesel electric	1546 kW and 1700 kW (Remarul Carpathia 2300 DE-M) Co'Co' axle formula	100 km/h	1959–1981
Class 62	Diesel electric	1546 kW Co'Co' axle formula	120 km/h	1966–1981
Class 63	Diesel electric	1582 kW Co'Co' axle formula. Modernised version of class 62 (includes electrical train heating and turbocharged 2 stroke, V8 EMD 8-710G diesel engine). Ca. 60 (including Class 65) in service.	120 km/h	2000–2007
Class 65	Diesel electric	1582 kW Co'Co' axle formula. Modernised version of class 60 (includes Electrical Train Heating and turbocharged 2, V8, EMD 8-710G diesel engine).	100 km/h	2004–2007
Class 67/68	Diesel electric	1546 kW Co'Co' axle formula. Same as class 60, but uses broad gauge (1,520 mm (4 ft 11 27/32 in)) for railways near the Moldovan and Ukrainian borders.	100 km/h	1959–1988
Class 69	Diesel electric	920 kW, Bo'Bo' axle formula	100 km/h	1975–1977
Class 73	Diesel electric	920 kW, Bo'Bo' axle formula. Same as class 69 but with two air compressors.	100 km/h	1975–1977
Class 80	Diesel hydraulic	920 kW, B'B' axle formula. Uses steam heating.	100 km/h	1966–1985
Class 81	Diesel hydraulic	920 kW, B'B' axle formula. Same as class 80, but has no train heating.	100 km/h	1966–1985
Class 82	Diesel hydraulic	1104 kW, B'B' axle formula. Based on class 80/81 overhauled by Alstom with new control systems, rebuilt body, electrical train heating and Caterpillar engine. Also 1000 kW B'B' axle formula modernized by Remarul.	100 km/h	1999–200x 2008-2011
Class 83	Diesel hydraulic	1104 kW, B'B' axle formula. Same as class 82 but uses MTU engine.	100 km/h	1998
Class 84	Diesel hydraulic	920 kW, B'B' axle formula. Same as class 80 but is used on broad-gauge railways.	100 km/h	1998
Subclass 841	Diesel hydraulic	1000 kW, B'B' axle formula, modernized by Remarul (Carpathia 1300 DH-M)	100 km/h	2009
Class 87	Diesel hydraulic	B'B' axle formula. Used for narrow gauge services.	40 km/h	1979–1984
Class 88	Diesel mechanical shunter	184 kW B axle formula. 81 were built originally, though a significant amount have been replaced by newer types.	40 km/h	1981–1984
Class 95	Diesel mechanical shunter	88 kW B axle formula.	55 km/h	1935–1950

=== Diesel multiple units ===
CFR Călători uses diesel multiple units (DMUs) mainly for passenger services on shorter and little-used lines, even though the Siemens Desiro DMUs have also been used for InterRegio and InterCity services on longer distances.

Name	Builder	Specifications and notes	Maximum speed	Years built
Class 77	Malaxa	88 kW power. Archaic railbus used mainly on rural routes in Banat and Bukovina. Some of them were phased out but the last ones left in service have been refurbished multiple times.	70 km/h	1935–1942
Class 78	Malaxa	162 kW power. Most were used as official government trains or by company officials when travelling (some have beds, showers, luxury fittings and press rooms).	100/120 km/h	1939–1954
Class 79	Waggonbau Görlitz	132 kW power. Formerly used by Deutsche Bahn as class 772 railbus and comprehensively modernised by MARUB Brașov. 12 units were bought in 1993–1996 by CFR for use on rural Personal services. Some were rented to private operators. In 2017, these railcars were withdrawn and abandoned in various locations.	90 km/h	1960–1977
Class 92	MARUB Brașov	153/208 kW power. Diesel hydraulic railbuses. Only 2 have been used. Contain 56 second-class seats.	80 km/h	1995
Class 96 (Desiro)	Siemens	550 kW. Diesel mechanical DMUs. Also known as Săgeata Albastră (Blue Arrow). Used on Regio and InterRegio services.	120 km/h	2003–present
Class 98 (formerly 91/92)	Duewag	485 kW. Bought from Deutsche Bahn and contain 12 first-class and 112 second-class seats. 2 were in operation, on Regio services between Satu-Mare and Jibou. Stored since 2017.	120 km/h	1994

=== Electric multiple units ===
A 6-car regional EMU built by Electroputere was used from 1975 to 1997, although they were rare, only 8 being made. By June 2006, there were no electric multiple units (EMUs) in service. However, CFR bought some second-hand Z-6100 and Z-6300 EMUs from SNCF, and their CFL version 250 with 2 cars and 260 with 3 cars, which were modernised by Remarul 16 Februarie in Cluj-Napoca and were used for commuter trains, as class 58, until 2020 when they were withdrawn. The last one to be used was 58-1007-2 (Z-6316).

Name	Builder	Specifications and notes	Maximum speed	Years built
Class 55/56/57	Electroputere, IVA Arad	1870 kW power. Used on certain lines by the Cluj, Craiova and Bucharest regional divisions. 336 seats	120 km/h	1974, 1984–1986
Class 58	Carel-Fouche, Alsthom	690 kW power. Used on local and regional electrified railways. 280 seats.	120 km/h	1965–1975

== Rail links with adjacent countries ==
Romania is linked by rail with all neighboring countries.

- Same gauge:
  - Bulgaria
  - Hungary
  - Serbia
- Break-of-gauge 1,435 mm (4 ft 8 1/2 in)/1,520 mm (4 ft 11 27/32 in):
  - Ukraine
  - Moldova

== Notable people ==
- George Cosmovici (1857–1920), mechanical engineer and inventor

== See also ==
- Bucharest North railway station
- CFR Cluj — professional football club
- Grup Feroviar Român
- Rail transport by country
- Rail transport in Romania
- Regiotrans
- Reșița Steam Locomotive Museum
- Transportation in Romania
