= George Cosmovici =

Romanian mechanical engineer

George Cosmovici (1857–1920) was a Romanian mechanical engineer and inventor who between 1901–1920 was director of the service and traction workshop at Căile Ferate Române. He was the initiator of the European research on the dimensions of outbreaks and apparatus for burning heavy fuel oils. He built a model of original spray of fuel oil, used in locomotive outbreaks. In 1906 he invented the oiling box that continues to oil the railcar wheels, invention that was adapted to the Romanian Railways and rail network to other countries in Europe.
