= CFR Class TEA =

Romanian series of electric train units (1974–1986)

Electroputere RES 1870 kW
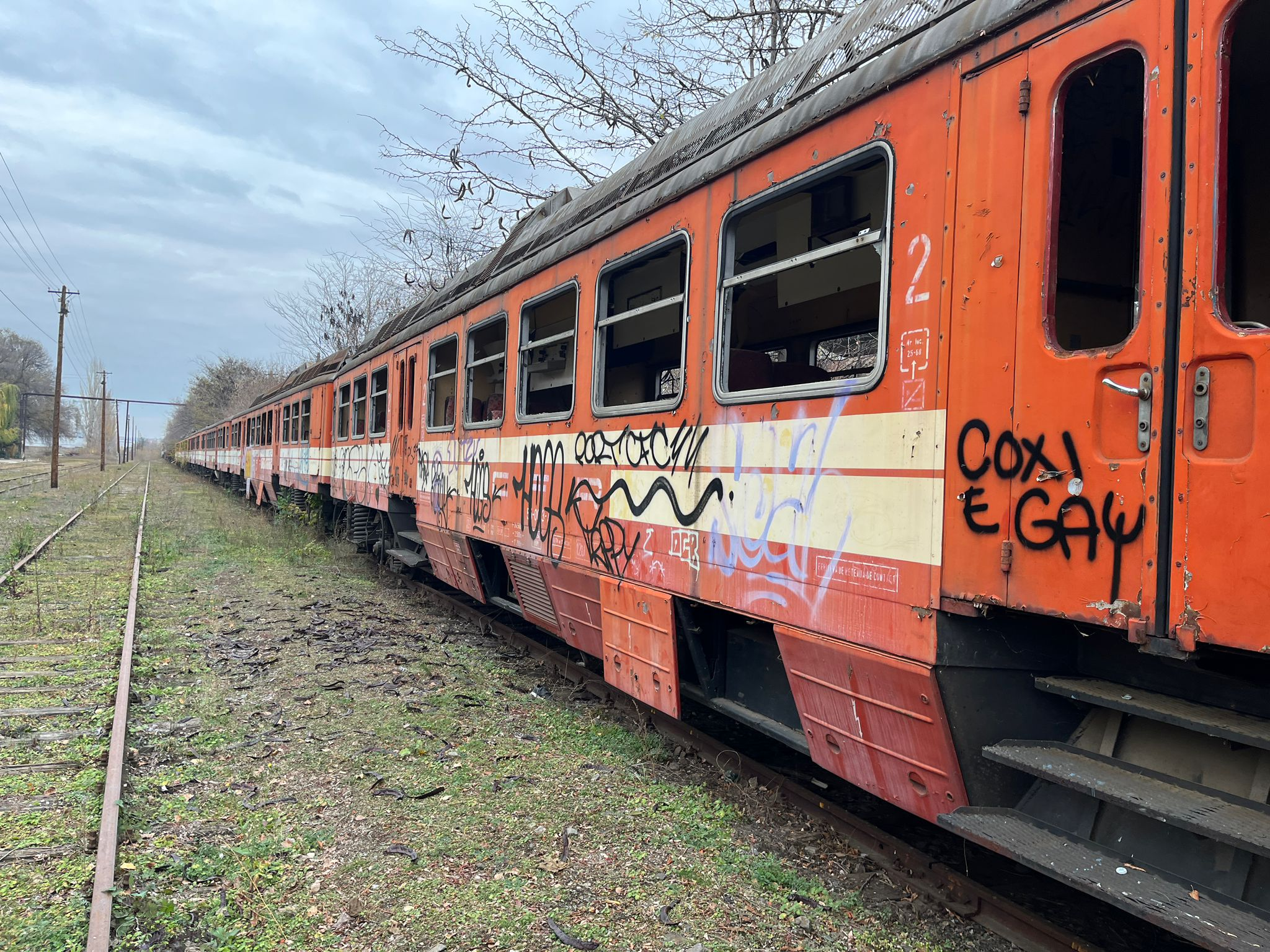
- Abandoned TEA-080 near Electroputere Craiova
- In service: 1975-1996
- Manufacturers: Electroputere Craiova, Întreprinderea de Vagoane Arad (IVA)
- Designers: Technological Institute of Research and Designing of Transports (ICPTT) Bucharest
- Assembly: Întreprinderea de Vagoane Arad
- Constructed: 1974 (1st prototype); 1984-1986 (series); 1991 (second prototype)
- Entered service: 1975, 1984-1986, 1992
- Scrapped: 1997-2003
- Number built: 8
- Number preserved: not known
- Successor: Softronic Hyperion (2013-2018)
- Formation: 4 motor cars and 2 trailer cars in the middle
- Capacity: 336 sitting places
- Operator: Romanian Railways
- Depots: București Călători, Cluj-Napoca, Craiova
- Lines served: Cluj-Teiuș, București Nord-Predeal, București Nord-Călărași, București Nord-Craiova, Craiova-Motru, Craiova-Târgu Jiu, Cluj-Dej

Specifications
- Train length: 98 m (321 ft 6 in) (on prototype with only 4 carriages)
- Width: 2,800 mm (9 ft 2 in)
- Height: 4,630 mm (15 ft 2 in) (with lowered pantograph)
- Wheel diameter: 1,250 mm (49 in)
- Maximum speed: 120 km/h (75 mph)
- Weight: 224 t (220 long tons; 247 short tons) (empty); 276 t (272 long tons; 304 short tons) (full)
- Traction motors: on both bogies on motor cars
- Power output: 1870 kW (on last trainset increased to 2870 kW)
- Acceleration: 20.7m/s
- Electric system: 25 kV AC
- Current collection: pantograph mounted on roof
- UIC classification: Bo-Bo (on all carriages)
- Bogies: Minden-Deutz bogies
- Minimum turning radius: 90 metres (295 ft 3 in)
- Braking systems: electric and air
- Safety system: Indusi
- Coupling system: chain coupling
- Track gauge: 1435 mm

The CFR Class TEA (also known as Class 55/56/57) was a small series of electric multiple units manufactured in Romania from 1974 to 1986 for Căile Ferate Române. Due to its rarity, not much is known about this trainset, albeit a technical sheet designed for potential export does exist online.

They were built by Electroputere Craiova (electric equipment) and Întreprinderea de Vagoane Arad (IVA) (railway cars) with the help of the Technological Institute of Research and Designing of Transports (ICPTT) from Bucharest.

In the early to mid-70s, the Romanian Railways was looking for an EMU train design that would replace conventional engine-towed local train consists, and also to work for a possible project that would envisage a regional railway network around Bucharest. The project took shape around 1972–1973, being built in 1974.

The prototype was derived from the regional passenger cars named "Bonanza" among the travellers, that were made by the IVA factory. The whole trainset was fitted with Minden-Deutz bogies, especially the motor bogies, and the electric equipment was made together by Škoda and Electroputere and it used thyristors.

It featured a destination board, open-able from the cab, where a cardboard plaque would be placed showing the route of the train, toilets and curtains. The drivers cab was fitted with an automatic door control, which split the door duties between the guard (who would open them) and the driver (who would close them), meaning that this train was designed for two-man crew operation. Aside from this there was also a communication unit where the driver would use a loudspeaker system to talk to passengers.

During 10 years of testing the train was heavily modified, mostly of electrical nature. The prototype was rarely used on Bucharest to Brașov duties (however only as far as Predeal, likely because the steep inclines towards Brașov might have been too much), but also on Bucharest to Craiova or to Călărași trains too. It was withdrawn in the late 1990s. In the old CFR classification it was given the numbers 080-TEA-001/002.

Series production started in 1984 but only eight of such multiple units were made. These were mostly used by the Cluj regional division for services between Cluj-Napoca and Teiuș or Dej, but also by the Craiova regional division for trains between Craiova and Motru or Târgu Jiu and by the Bucharest regional division for trains to Călărași. In the new classification they were referred to as the following:

- 55 00xx, motor driving car, second class, without pantograph
- 56 00xx, motor cabless car, second class, with pantograph
- 57 00xx, trailer car, first class, without pantograph
- 57 00xx, trailer car, second class, without pantograph
- 56 00xx, motor cabless car, second class, with pantograph
- 55 00xx, motor driving car, second class, without pantograph

Whilst officially they were known as the RES 1870 kW by the Electroputere, where RES stood for "Suburban Electric Multiple Unit" (Ramă Electrică Suburbană).

Another prototype was realized in 1991, which had stronger traction motors of 2870 kW overall. But all these units were plagued with brake and electrical equipment issues, so after the 1990s they were quickly retired, in favour of CFR Class EA-pulled local trains. Nowadays, the only remaining example is the 1991 prototype, although a few cars of the series production trainsets were known to have survived years ago at the Grivița Carriage Works, while others lay stored in Războieni and Teiuș before they were scrapped.
