= Green Cargo =

Swedish rail cargo company

Green Cargo AB
- Company type: Government-owned
- Industry: Logistics
- Founded: 1 January 2001; 25 years ago
- Headquarters: Solna, Stockholm County, Sweden
- Key people: Ted Söderholm (CEO), Jan Sundling (chairman)
- Products: Rail Transport; Maintenance
- Revenue: SEK (2019) 4.1 billion
- Number of employees: 1,900
- Website: Homepage

Green Cargo AB is a Swedish state-owned logistics company that transports various types of goods by train. It was created on 1 January 2001 out of the logistics division of Swedish State Railways (SJ). While organised as a public limited company, it is wholly owned by the Swedish government. As of 2019, it was responsible for almost 80% of Swedish rail freight transport.

== Activities ==
While Green Cargo has traditionally been oriented towards serving the Swedish market, via partnerships with other rail freight companies, international freight trains in the European market are also operated. In January 2022, Green Cargo announced that it was restructuring its international operations to simplify operations, reduce costs, and reduce transit times. Changes included the subcontracting of its Denmark Direct service to DB Cargo Scandinavia for increased capacity, while the Italy Direct and Austria Direct services were rerouted to run via Denmark instead of traditional train ferries. Various Swedish industries have made use of Green Cargo's services, such as the car manufacturer Volvo, which has routinely had goods trains run from Sweden to its production plant at Gent, Belgium. During 2020, these services were adjusted by Green Cargo in response to the COVID-19 pandemic to instead focus on the transporting of food productions on behalf of the grocery chain ICA Gruppen.

The vast majority of Green Cargo's trains are hauled using electric locomotives; by 2023, the company was operating roughly 400 freight trains per day while 96 percent of tonne kilometrage was being achieved via electric traction, minimising its climate impact. Its definition of sustainable development is the long-term outcome of six target areas: finance, quality, security, employees, the environment and society. Since 2006, the company's sustainability reports have been reviewed by external auditors with similar scrutiny as financial data.

Various efforts to improve the company's financial standing have been conducted since its creation; a restructuring programme launched in 2015 pursued a more effective production model that reportedly increased the average train's fill rate by 15 percent. New practices have included backloading, reducing empty return trips after delivering one customer's cargo by identifying and carrying goods from another on that return journey. Green Cargo has spoken out on the impact of track access charges on its business and the wider rail sector. Operations prior to the mid 2010s had typically been unprofitable, however, an operating profit of SEK 200m (€20.5m) was recorded between 2013 and 2016. Various other initiatives to incorporate new technologies and computer-based systems have also been undertaken by the operator, such as the development of a simplified and more stable computer platform for its operations and increasing the flexibility of its operations, particularly in terms of fleet and capacity management.

== Rolling stock ==
Green Cargo operates 370 locomotives of various types along with 5,250 wagons. A traditional staple of the company's fleet has been the SJ Rc series of electric locomotives; during the late 2000s, 42 Class Rc2 locomotives underwent refurbishment by the multinational rolling stock manufacturer Bombardier Transportation, to reflect the upgrades applied, they were redesignated as Class Rd2 locomotives. In the 2010s, Green Cargo has operated at least 16 Bombardier Traxx locomotives, locally referred to as Re, some of which were leased from the European rolling stock hire company Alpha Trains. Another new locomotive class has been the Romanian-built Softronic Transmontana, designated Mb by Green Cargo; the first pair of MB electric locomotives were ordered in July 2017; by 2022, Green Cargo had 16 such locomotives in its fleet.

Various modification programmes aimed at improving the performance of its rolling stock have been conducted. By the 2010s, locomotive engines were being continuously upgraded, such as with the addition of start-stop systems to reduce unnecessary emissions and noise pollution. During 2018, Green Cargo started using XXXL containers on its trains, allowing for larger payloads to be carried. In the winter of 2020/2021, Green Cargo commenced a trial of digital automatic couplings on its rolling stock to automate several time-intensive and hazardous tasks in forming its trains; the company stated that the technology would improve capacity, safety margins, operational efficiency, punctuality, and profitability.

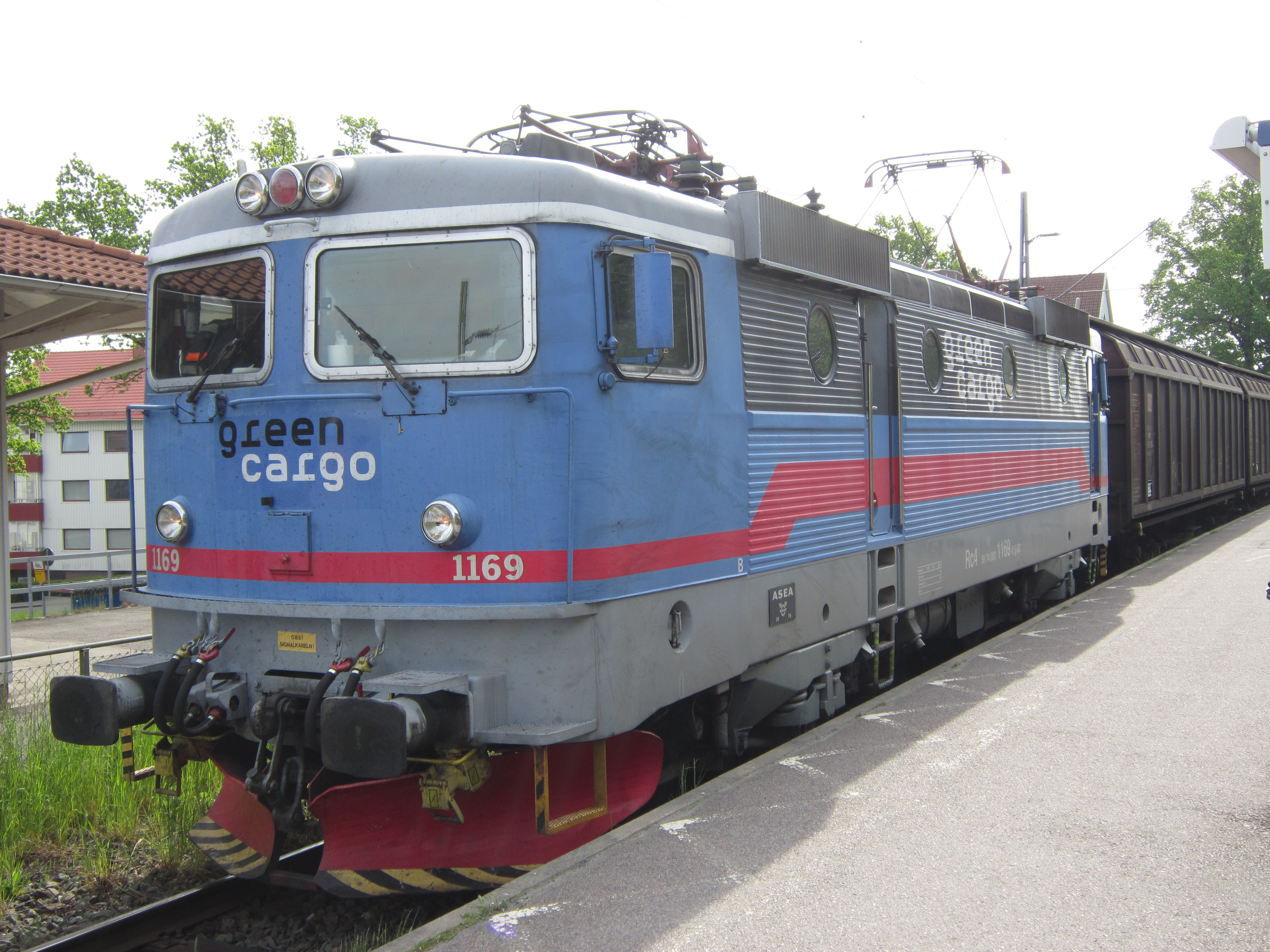
Rc4 1169 in blue livery

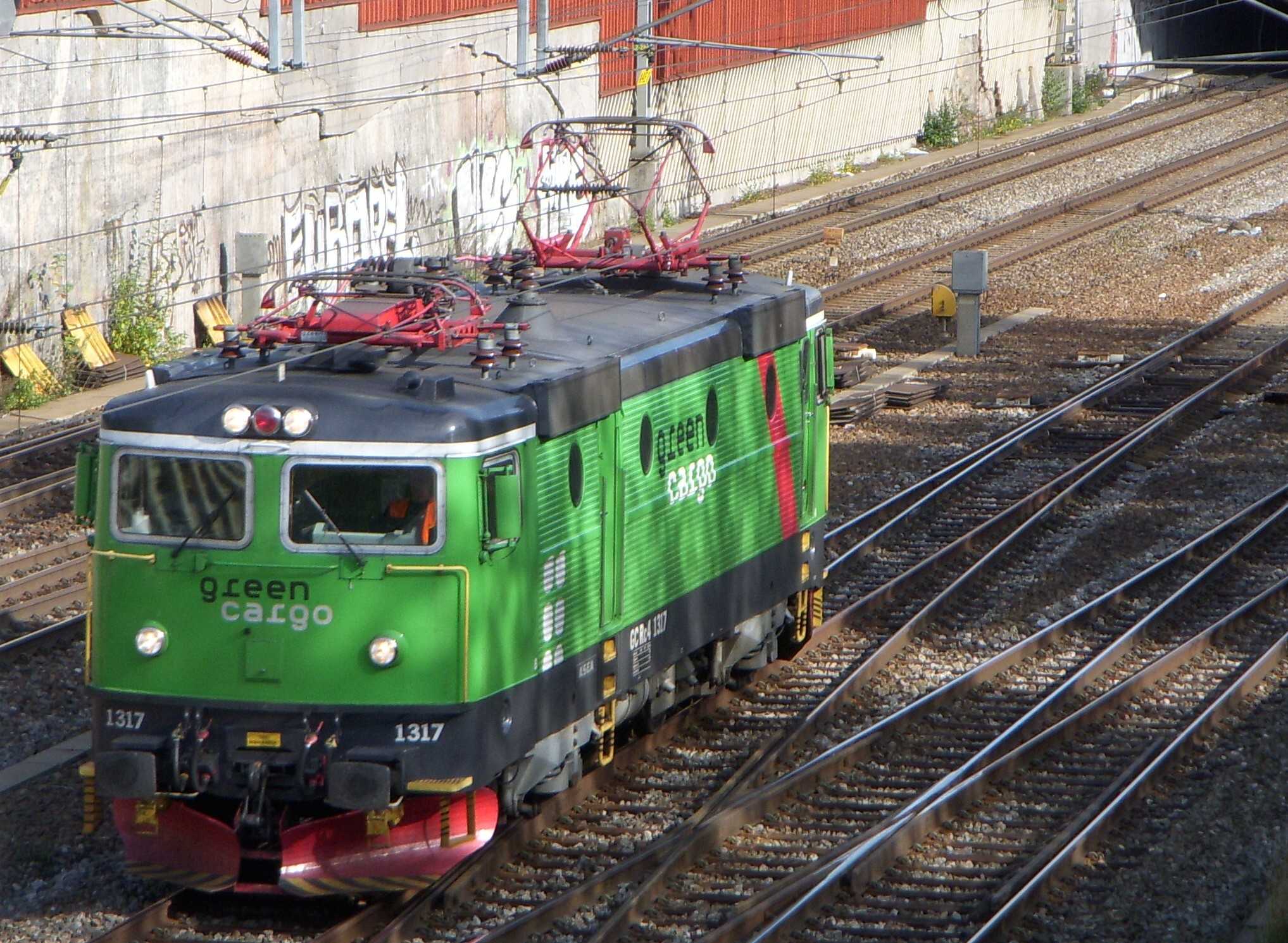
Rc4 1317 in green livery

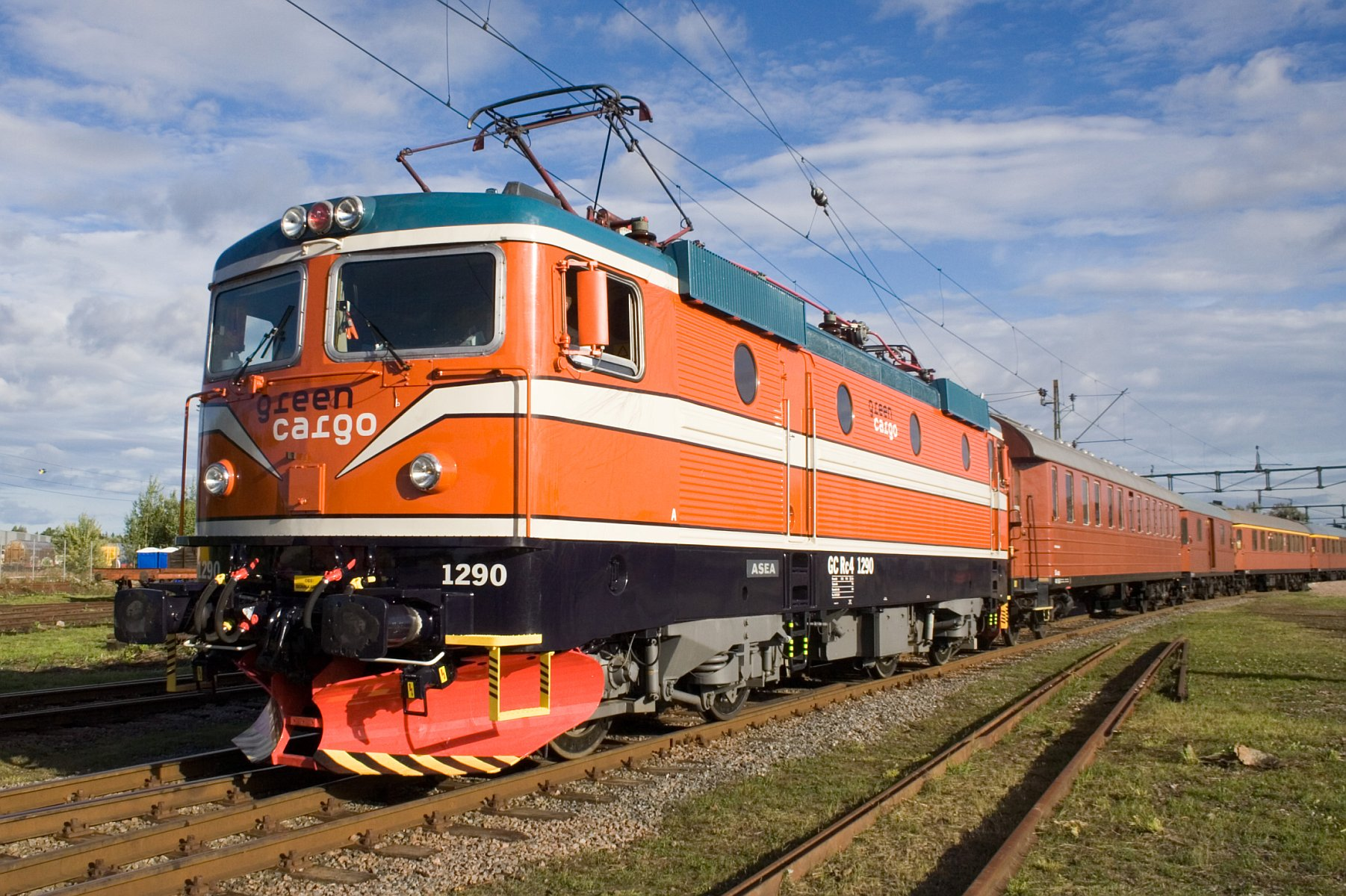
Rc4 1290 in original SJ orange livery

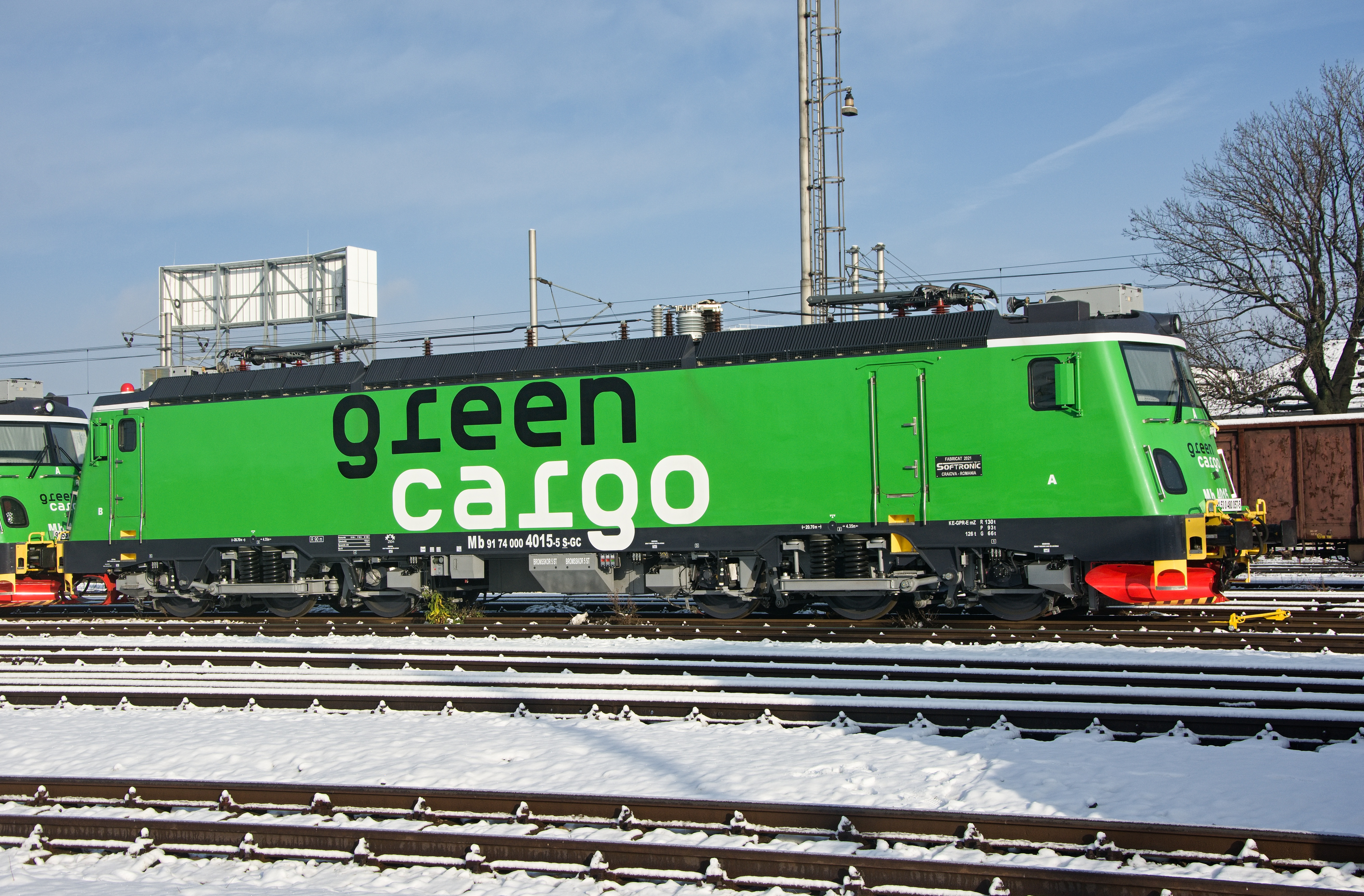
Green Cargo Class Mb

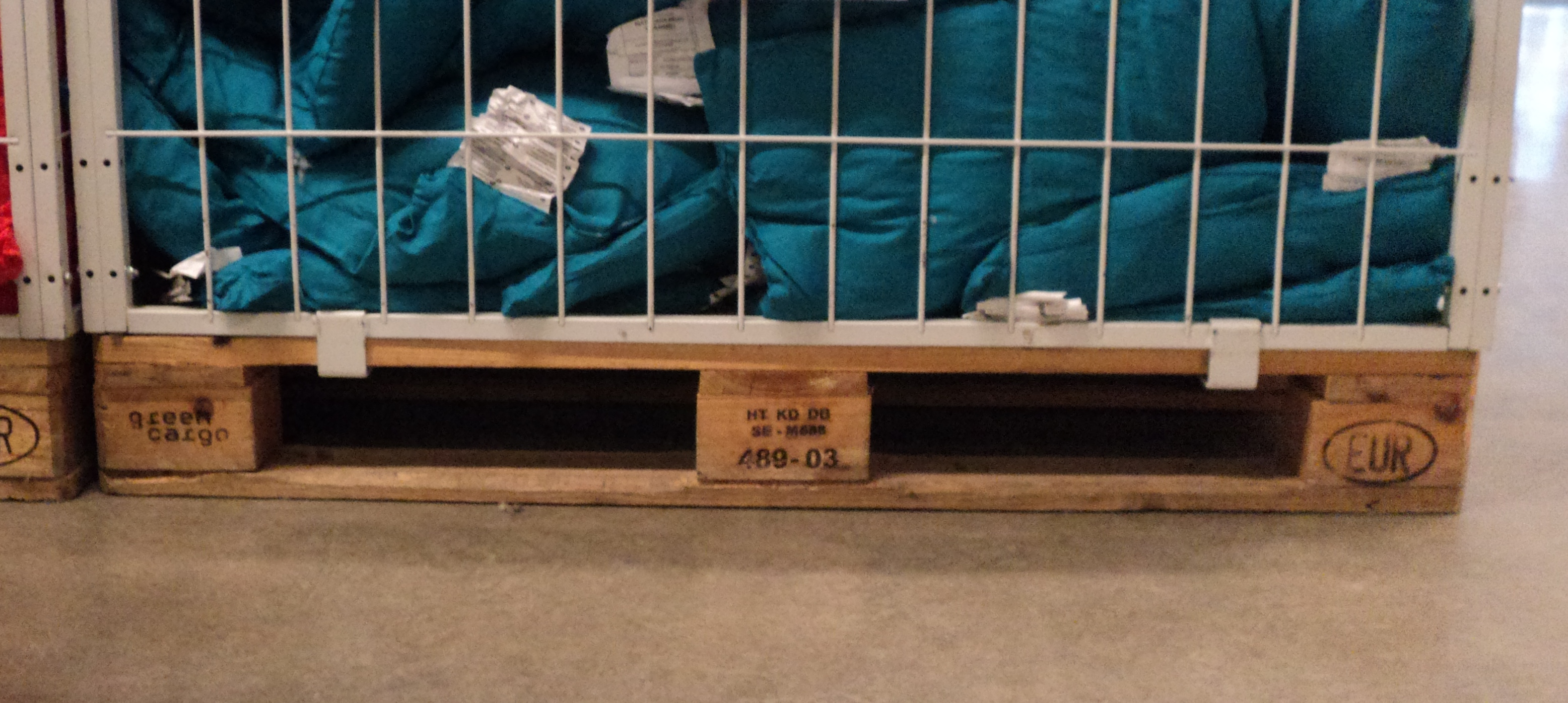
Green Cargo pallet seen at a Canadian Ikea store.

== See also ==
- SJ AB - public transport
- SeaRail - part-owned by Green Cargo; operating freight waggons between Sweden and Finland
