= Softronic Transmontana =

Electric locomotive

Transmontana
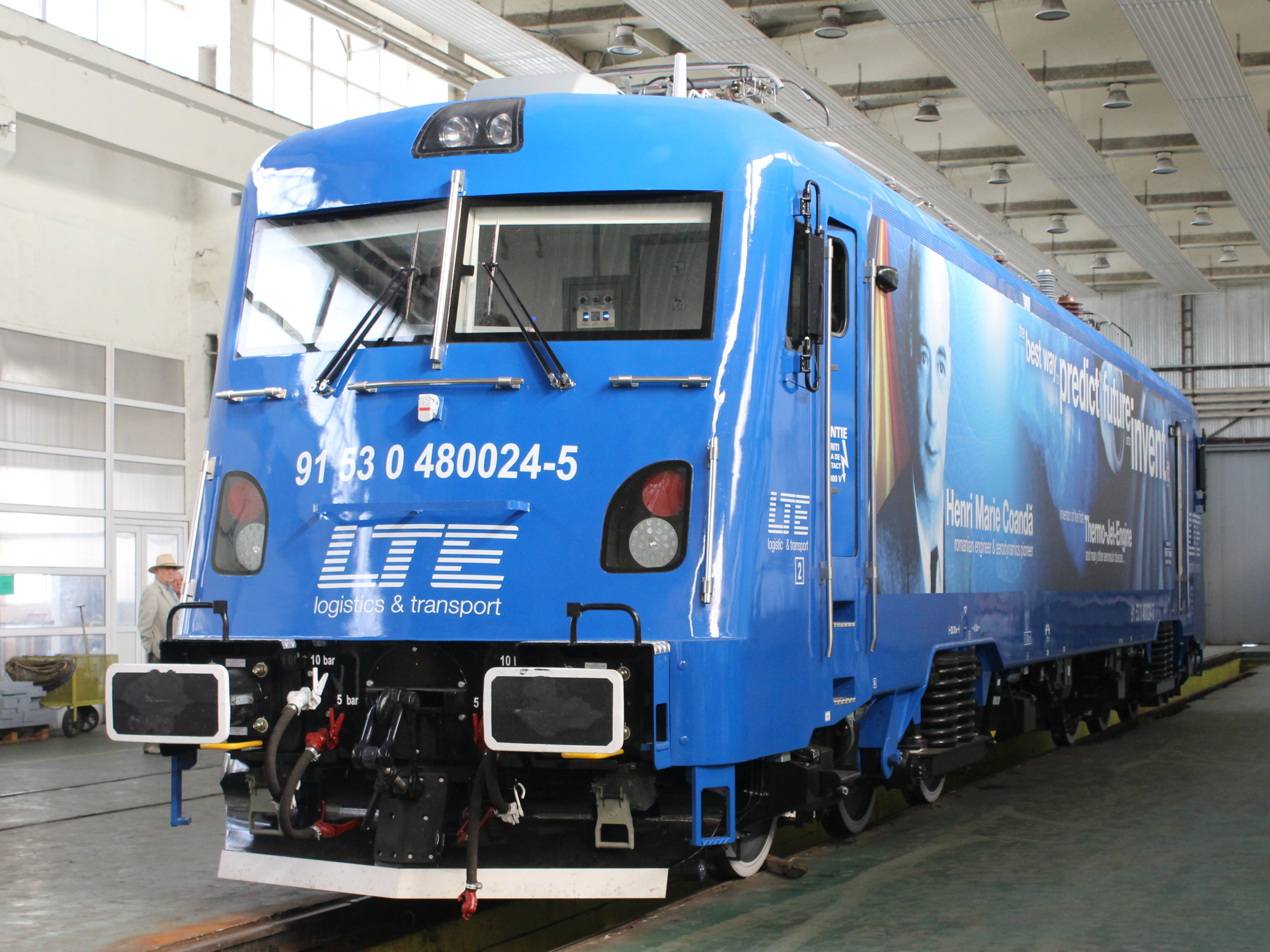
- Transmontana owned by LTE
Type and origin
- Designer: Softronic
- Build date: 2010 –
- Total produced: 66 (as of August 2022)
Specifications
- Configuration
  - UIC: Co'Co'
- Gauge: 1,435 mm (4 ft 8 1/2 in)
- Length
  - Over couplers: 20,7 m
- Axle load: 21.5 metric tonnes
- Loco weight: 120 metric tonnes
- Electric system/s: 25 kV AC; 15 kV AC
Performance figures
- Maximum speed: 160 km/h
- Power output
  - Starting: 6600 kW
  - Continuous: 6000 kW

Softronic Transmontana is a six-axle electric locomotive for freight trains, produced by the Romanian locomotive producer Softronic.

== History ==
The first machine of this type was delivered in 2010.

== Users ==
It is used for freight train operation by operators based in Austria, Hungary, Romania, Sweden, Slovakia.

Company	Country	Fleet
CER Cargo	Hungary	6
CFR Călători (Class 480)	Romania	1
CFR Călători (Class 481 - modernised and rebuilt version of former 060-EA locomotives)	Romania	19 contracted (1 in tests, 4 undergoing modernisation)
CTV	Romania	2
DB Cargo Romania	Romania	17
E-P Rail	Romania	4
Green Cargo (Class Mb)	Sweden	16
LTE Group	Austria	5
MMV	Hungary	3
Prvá Slovenská železničná	Slovakia	1
Vest Trans Rail	Romania	4
Transferoviar Grup	Romania	2 (since autumn 2024)
