= Verești =

- Commune
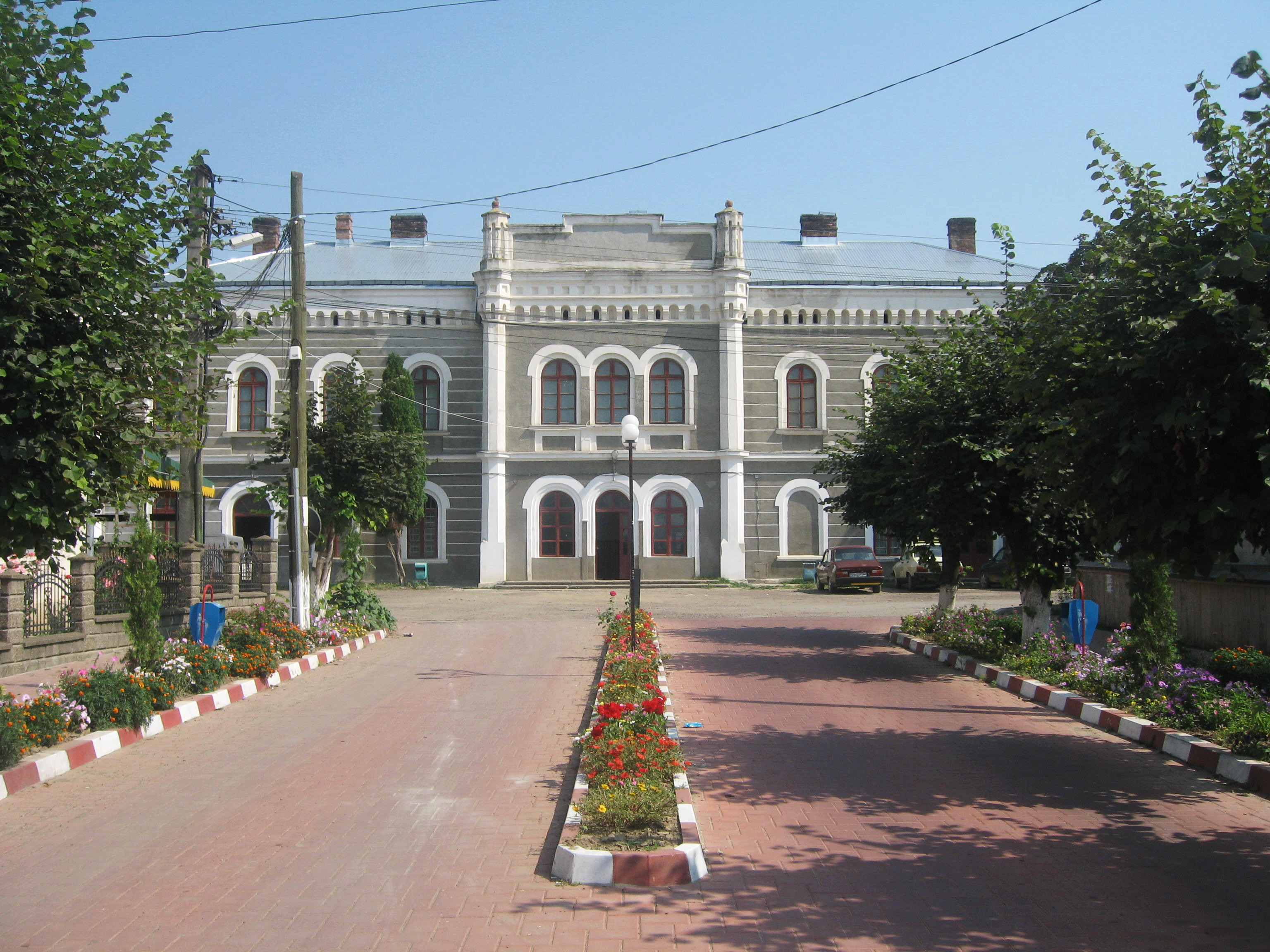
- Railway station in Verești

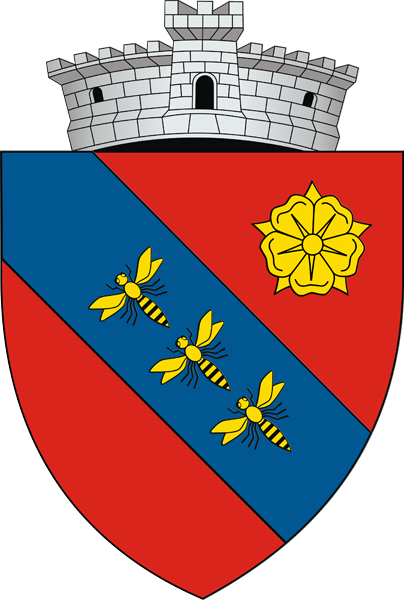
- Coat of arms

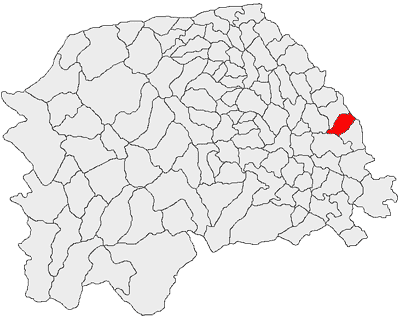
- Location in Suceava County

- Location in Romania
- Coordinates: 47°36′20″N 26°26′30″E
- Country: Romania
- County: Suceava
- Subdivisions: Verești, Bursuceni, Corocăiești, Hancea

Government
  - Mayor (2024–2028): Dănuț Gavriliuc (PSD)
- Area: 39.86 km^{2} (15.39 sq mi)
- Elevation: 268 m (879 ft)
- Population (2021-12-01): 6,343
  - Density: 159.1/km^{2} (412.1/sq mi)
- Time zone: UTC+02:00 (EET)
  - Summer (DST): UTC+03:00 (EEST)
- Postal code: 727600
- Area code: (+40) x30
- Vehicle reg.: SV
- Website: comunaveresti.ro

Verești is a commune located in Suceava County, Western Moldavia, Romania. It is composed of four villages: Bursuceni, Corocăiești, Hancea and Verești.
