= Marine propulsion =

Systems for generating thrust for ships and boats on water

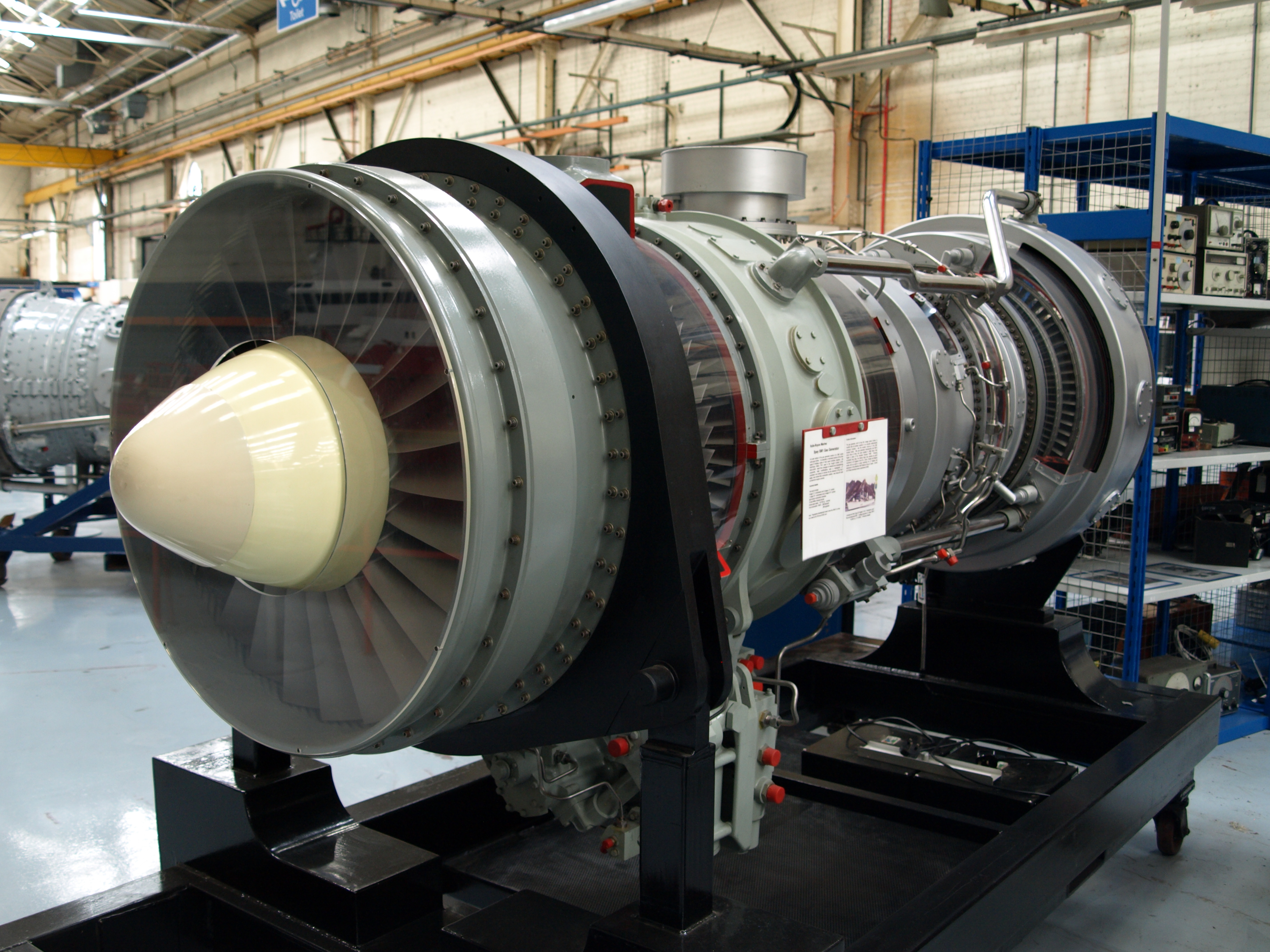
Rolls-Royce Marine Spey, a gas turbine developed by Rolls-Royce Holdings in the 1960s for marine propulsion

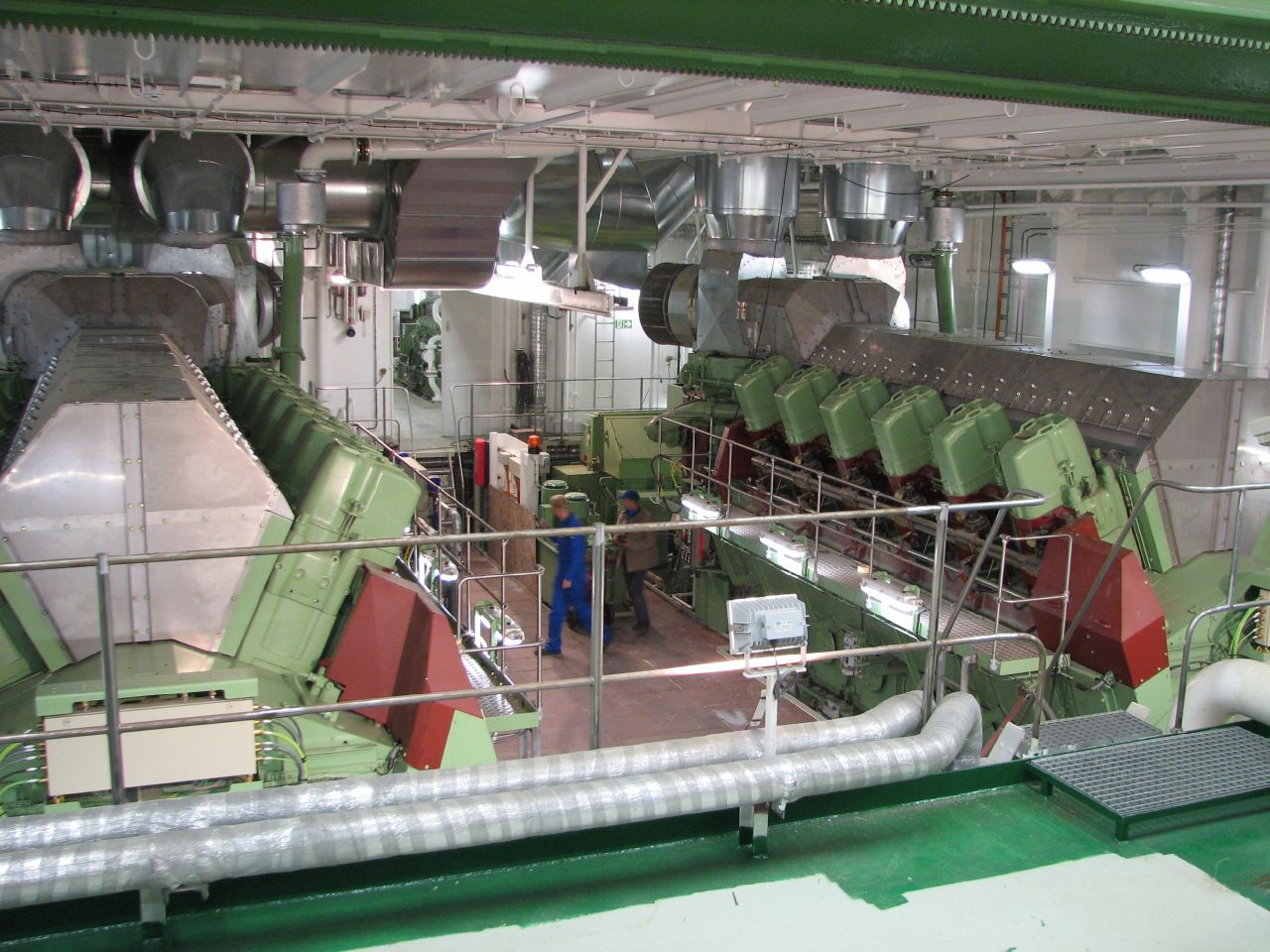
V12 marine diesel engines

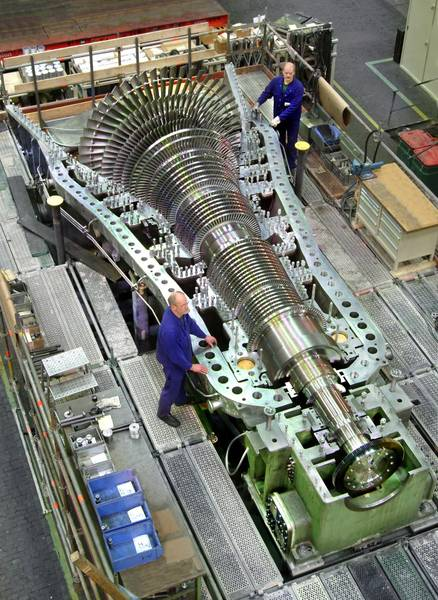
A marine steam turbine manufactured by MAN Energy Solutions

Marine propulsion is the mechanism or system used to generate thrust to move a watercraft through water. While paddles and sails are still used on some smaller boats, most modern ships are propelled by mechanical systems consisting of an electric motor or internal combustion engine driving a propeller, or less frequently, in pump-jets, an impeller. Marine engineering is the discipline concerned with the engineering design process of marine propulsion systems.

Human-powered paddles and oars, and later, sails were the first forms of marine propulsion. Rowed galleys, some equipped with sail, played an important early role in early human seafaring and warfare. The first advanced mechanical means of marine propulsion was the marine steam engine, introduced in the early 19th century. During the 20th century it was replaced by two-stroke or four-stroke diesel engines, outboard motors, and gas turbine engines on faster ships. Marine nuclear reactors, which appeared in the 1950s, produce steam to propel warships and icebreakers; commercial application, attempted late that decade, failed to catch on. Electric motors using battery packs have been used for propulsion on submarines and electric boats and have been proposed for energy-efficient propulsion.

Development in liquefied natural gas (LNG) fueled engines are gaining recognition for their low emissions and cost advantages. Stirling engines, which are quieter, smoother running, propel a number of small submarines in order to run as quietly as possible. Its design is not used in civilian marine application due to lower total efficiency than internal combustion engines or power turbines.

== History ==
=== Pre-mechanization ===
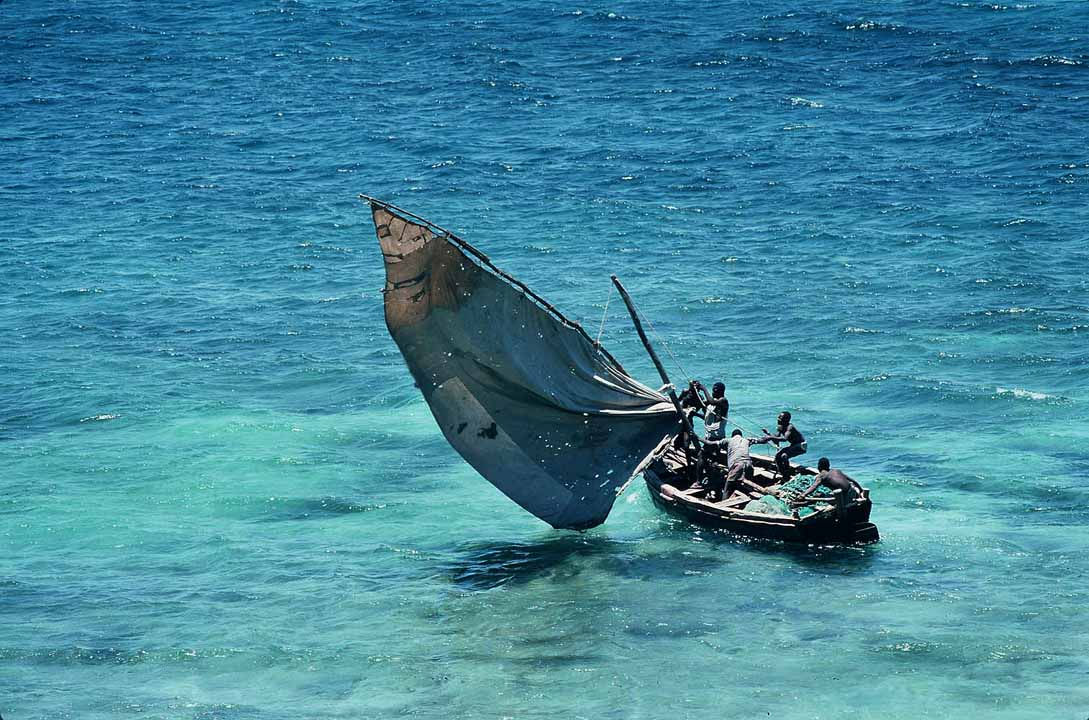
A wind propelled fishing boat in Mozambique

Until the application of the coal-fired steam engine to ships in the early 19th century, oars or the wind were the principal means of watercraft propulsion. Merchant ships predominantly used sail, but during periods when naval warfare depended on ships closing to ram or to fight hand-to-hand, galley were preferred for their manoeuvrability and speed. The Greek navies that fought in the Peloponnesian War used triremes, as did the Romans at the Battle of Actium. The development of naval gunnery from the 16th century onward vaulted broadside weight ahead of maneuverability; this led to the dominance of the sail-powered warship over the following three centuries.

In modern times, human propulsion is found mainly on small boats or as auxiliary propulsion on sailboats. Human propulsion includes the push pole, rowing, and pedals.

Propulsion by sail generally consists of a sail hoisted on an erect mast, supported by stays, and controlled by lines made of rope. Sails were the dominant form of commercial propulsion until the late nineteenth century, and continued to be used well into the twentieth century on routes where wind was assured and coal was not available, such as in the South American nitrate trade. Sails are now generally used for recreation and racing, although innovative applications of kites/royals, turbosails, rotorsails, wingsails, windmills and SkySails's own kite buoy-system have been used on larger modern vessels for fuel savings.

=== Mechanized ===
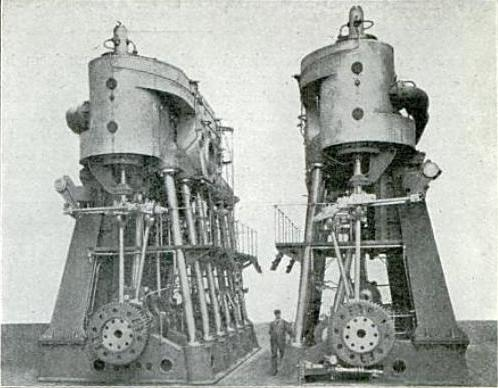
Marine steam reciprocating engines, c. 1905

In the second half of the 20th century, rising fuel costs almost led to the demise of the steam turbine. Most new ships since about 1960 have been built with diesel engines, both four- and two-stroke. The last major passenger ship built with steam turbines was Fairsky, launched in 1984. Similarly, many steam ships were re-engined to improve fuel efficiency. One high-profile example was the 1968 built Queen Elizabeth 2 which had her steam turbines replaced with a diesel-electric propulsion plant in 1986.

Most new-build ships with steam turbines are specialist vessels such as nuclear-powered vessels, and certain merchant vessels (notably Liquefied Natural Gas (LNG) and coal carriers) where the cargo can be used as bunker fuel.

== Engines ==
=== Steam ===
Steam power, which became prominent due to the First Industrial Revolution, has led to two types of steam engine for ships: reciprocating (with steam driving reciprocating pistons connected to a crankshaft) and turbine (with steam driving blades attached radially to a rotating shaft). The shaft power from each can either go directly to the propeller, pump jet or other mechanism, or it goes through some form of transmission; mechanical, electrical or hydraulic. In the latter half of the 19th century, steam was one of the main power sources for marine propulsion. In 1869, there was a large influx of steam ships as the steam engine underwent large advancements during the time period.

==== Reciprocating ====
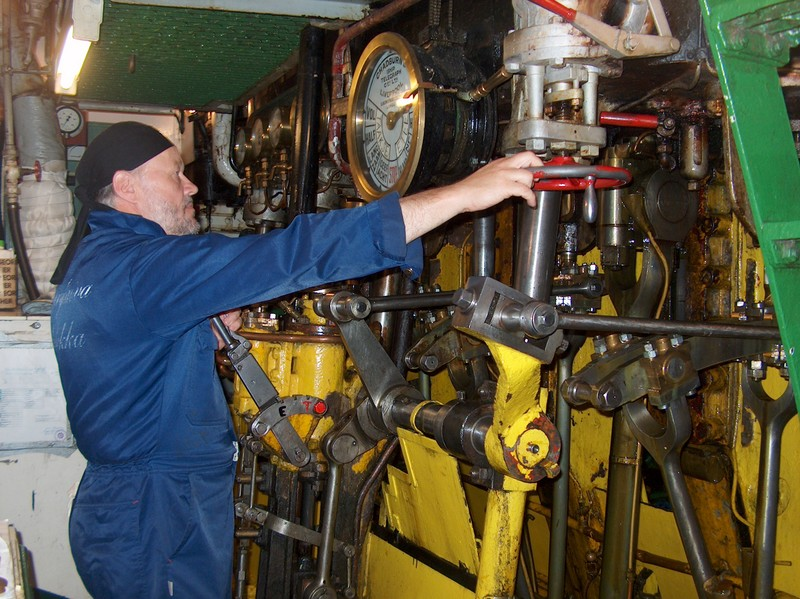
SS Ukkopekka uses a triple expansion steam engine

Animation of how a triple expansion steam engine works

The development of piston-engined steamships was a complex process. Early steamships were fueled by wood, later ones by coal or fuel oil. Early ships used stern or side paddle wheels, which gave way to screw propellers.

The first commercial success accrued to Robert Fulton's North River Steamboat (often called Clermont) in US in 1807, followed in Europe by the 45-foot (14 m) Comet of 1812. Steam propulsion progressed considerably over the rest of the 19th century. Notable developments include the steam surface condenser, which eliminated the use of sea water in the ship's boilers. This, along with improvements in boiler technology, permitted higher steam pressures, and thus the use of higher efficiency multiple expansion (compound) engines. As the means of transmitting the engine's power, paddle wheels gave way to more efficient screw propellers.

Multiple expansion steam engines became widespread in the late 19th century. These engines exhausted steam from a high pressure cylinder to a lower pressure cylinder, giving a large increase in efficiency.

==== Turbines ====
Steam turbines were powered by boilers burning, initially, coal, then fuel oil. The marine steam turbine developed by Sir Charles Algernon Parsons raised the power-to-weight ratio. He achieved publicity by demonstrating it unofficially in the 100-foot (30 m) Turbinia at the Spithead Naval Review in 1897. This facilitated a generation of high-speed liners in the first half of the 20th century, and rendered the reciprocating steam engine obsolete; first in warships, and later in merchant vessels.

In the early 20th century, heavy fuel oil came into more general use and began to replace coal as the fuel of choice in steamships. Its great advantages were convenience, reduced manpower by removal of the need for trimmers and stokers, and reduced space needed for fuel bunkers.

==== Nuclear-powered ====
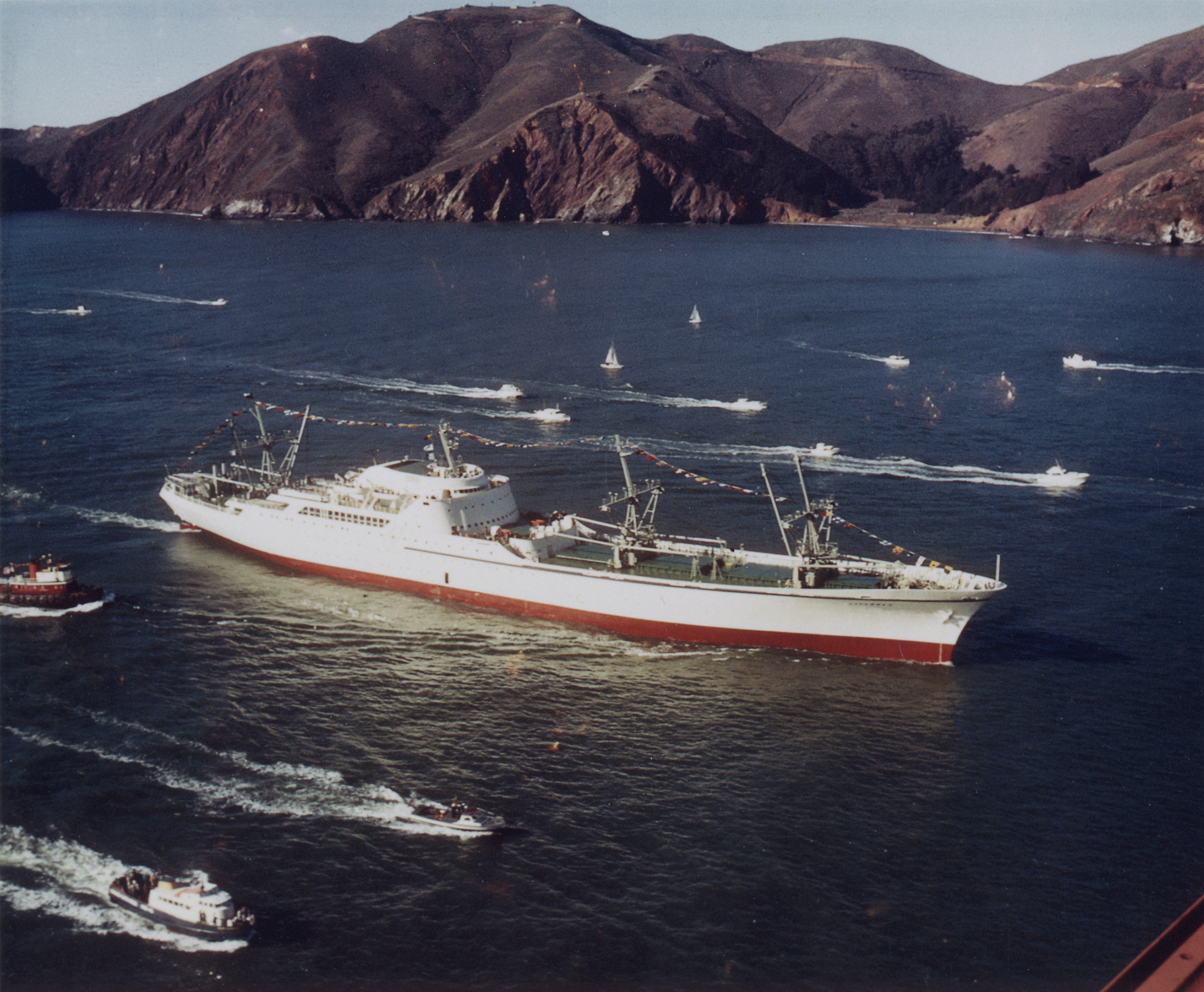
NS Savannah was the first nuclear-powered cargo ship.

Some steam turbine systems use nuclear power for their steam generation. In these vessels, the nuclear reactor heats water to create steam to drive the turbines. When first developed, very low prices of diesel oil limited nuclear propulsion's commercial attraction. The advantages of its fuel-price security, greater safety and low emissions were unable to overcome the higher initial costs of a nuclear powerplant. In 2019, nuclear propulsion is rare except in some Navy and specialist vessels such as icebreakers. In large aircraft carriers, the space formerly used for ship's bunkerage is used instead to bunker aviation fuel. In submarines, the ability to run submerged at high speed and in relative quiet for long periods holds obvious advantages. A few naval cruisers have also employed nuclear power; as of 2006, the only ones remaining in service are the Russian Kirov class. An example of a non-military ship with nuclear marine propulsion is the Arktika-class icebreaker with 75,000 shaft horsepower (55,930 kW). In an ice-breaker, an advantage is fuel security and safety in demanding arctic conditions. The commercial experiment of the NS Savannah ended before the dramatic fuel price increases of the 1970s. The Savannah also suffered from an inefficient design, being partly for passengers and partly for cargo.

In recent times, there is some renewed interest in commercial nuclear shipping. Fuel oil prices are now much higher. Nuclear-powered cargo ships could lower costs associated with carbon dioxide emissions and travel at higher cruise speeds than conventional diesel powered vessels.

=== Diesel ===
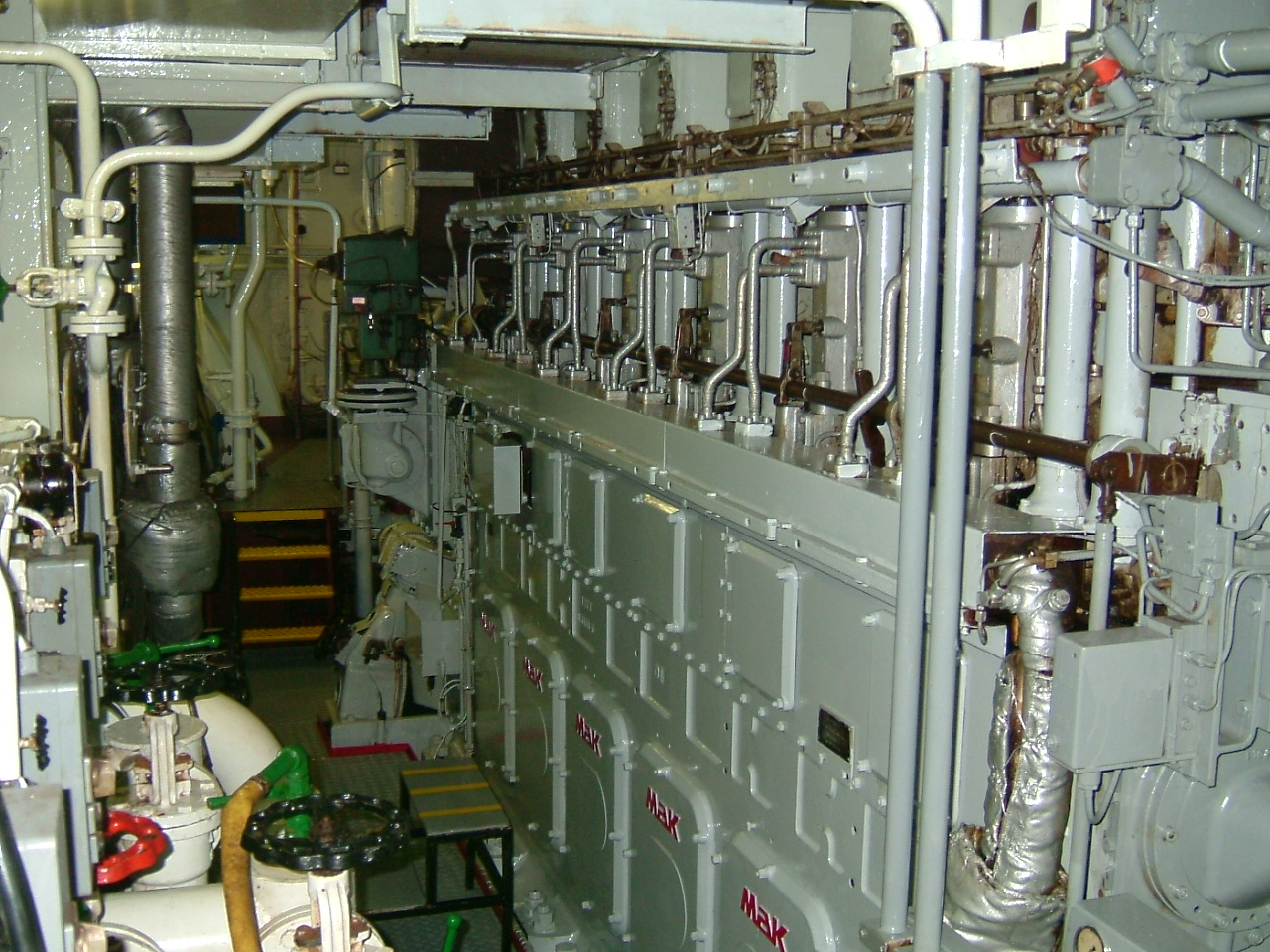
A modern diesel engine aboard a cargo ship

Intake and exhaust flow in a 2-stroke heavy-duty diesel engine

Most modern ships use a reciprocating diesel engine as their prime mover, due to their operating simplicity, robustness and fuel economy compared to most other prime mover mechanisms. The rotating crankshaft can be directly coupled to the propeller with slow speed engines, via a reduction gearbox for medium and high speed engines, or via an alternator and electric motor in diesel-electric vessels. The rotation of the crankshaft is connected to the camshaft or a hydraulic pump on an intelligent diesel.

The reciprocating marine diesel engine first came into use in 1903 when the diesel electric rivertanker Vandal was put into service by Branobel. Diesel engines soon offered greater efficiency than the steam turbine, but for many years had an inferior power-to-space ratio. The advent of turbocharging however hastened their adoption, by permitting greater power densities.

Diesel engines today are broadly classified according to

- Their operating cycle: two-stroke engine or four-stroke engine
- Their construction: crosshead, trunk, or opposed piston
- Their speed
  - Slow speed: any engine with a maximum operating speed up to 300 revolutions per minute (rpm), although most large two-stroke slow speed diesel engines operate below 120 rpm. Some very long stroke engines have a maximum speed of around 80 rpm. The largest, most powerful engines in the world are slow speed, two stroke, crosshead diesels.
  - Medium speed: any engine with a maximum operating speed in the range 300–1000 rpm. Many modern four-stroke medium speed diesel engines have a maximum operating speed of around 500 rpm.
  - High speed: any engine with a maximum operating speed above 1000 rpm.

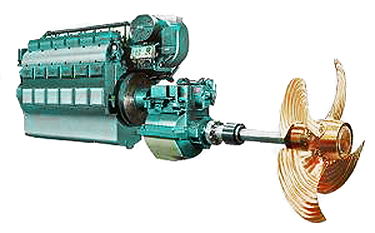
4-Stroke Marine Diesel Engine System

Most modern larger merchant ships use either slow speed, two stroke, crosshead engines, or medium speed, four stroke, trunk engines. Some smaller vessels may use high speed diesel engines.

The size of the different types of engines is an important factor in selecting what will be installed in a new ship. Slow speed two-stroke engines are much taller, but the footprint required is smaller than that needed for equivalently rated four-stroke medium speed diesel engines. As space above the waterline is at a premium in passenger ships and ferries (especially ones with a car deck), these ships tend to use multiple medium speed engines resulting in a longer, lower engine room than that needed for two-stroke diesel engines. Multiple engine installations also give redundancy in the event of mechanical failure of one or more engines, and the potential for greater efficiency over a wider range of operating conditions.

As modern ships' propellers are at their most efficient at the operating speed of most slow speed diesel engines, ships with these engines do not generally need gearboxes. Usually such propulsion systems consist of either one or two propeller shafts each with its own direct drive engine. Ships propelled by medium or high speed diesel engines may have one or two (sometimes more) propellers, commonly with one or more engines driving each propeller shaft through a gearbox. Where more than one engine is geared to a single shaft, each engine will most likely drive through a clutch, allowing engines not being used to be disconnected from the gearbox while others keep running. This arrangement lets maintenance be carried out while under way, even far from port.

=== Gas turbines ===
Combined marine propulsion
Combined diesel or gas	(CODOG)
Combined diesel and gas	(CODAG)
Combined diesel–electric and diesel	(CODLAD)
Combined diesel–electric and gas	(CODLAG)
Combined diesel and diesel	(CODAD)
Combined steam and gas	(COSAG)
Combined gas or gas	(COGOG)
Combined gas and gas	(COGAG)
Combined gas and steam	(COGAS)
Combined nuclear and steam	(CONAS)
Integrated electric propulsion	(IEP or IFEP)

Many warships built since the 1960s have used gas turbines for propulsion, as have a few passenger ships, like the jetfoil. Gas turbines are commonly used in combination with other types of engine. Most recently, RMS Queen Mary 2 has had gas turbines installed in addition to diesel engines. Because of their poor thermal efficiency at low power (cruising) output, it is common for ships using them to have diesel engines for cruising, with gas turbines reserved for when higher speeds are needed. However, in the case of passenger ships the main reason for installing gas turbines has been to allow a reduction of emissions in sensitive environmental areas or while in port. Some warships, and a few modern cruise ships have also used steam turbines to improve the efficiency of their gas turbines in a combined cycle, where waste heat from a gas turbine exhaust is utilized to boil water and create steam for driving a steam turbine. In such combined cycles, thermal efficiency can be the same or slightly greater than that of diesel engines alone; however, the grade of fuel needed for these gas turbines is far more costly than that needed for the diesel engines, so the running costs are still higher.

Some private yachts, such as the Aga Khan's Alamshar, also have gas turbine propulsion (Pratt and Whitney ST40M), which enables top speeds of up to 70 knots, which is unique for a 50-meter yacht.

==== LNG Engines ====
Shipping companies are required to comply with the International Maritime Organization (IMO) and the International Convention for the Prevention of Pollution from Ships emissions rules. Dual fuel engines are fueled by either marine grade diesel, heavy fuel oil, or liquefied natural gas (LNG). A Marine LNG Engine has multiple fuel options, allowing vessels to transit without relying on one type of fuel. Studies show that LNG is the most efficient of fuels, although limited access to LNG fueling stations limits the production of such engines. Vessels providing services in the LNG industry have been retrofitted with dual-fuel engines, and have been proved to be extremely effective. Benefits of dual-fuel engines include fuel and operational flexibility, high efficiency, low emissions, and operational cost advantages.

Liquefied natural gas engines offer the marine transportation industry with an environmentally friendly alternative to provide power to vessels. In 2010, STX Finland and Viking Line signed an agreement to begin construction on what would be the largest environmentally friendly cruise ferry. Construction of NB 1376 will be completed in 2013. According to Viking Line, vessel NB 1376 will primarily be fueled by liquefied natural gas. Vessel NB 1376 nitrogen oxide emissions will be almost zero, and sulphur oxide emissions will be at least 80% below the International Maritime Organization's (IMO) standards.

Company profits from tax cuts and operational cost advantages has led to the gradual growth of LNG fuel use in engines.

LPG Engines

As environmental sustainability becomes a paramount concern, the maritime industry is exploring cleaner propulsion technologies. LPG (Liquid Petroleum Gas) is another fuel alternative that brings operational, economics and environmental benefits. Studies have shown that using LPG reduces sulfur oxide emissions by 97% and particulate matter by 90%. Similar to LNG, many LPG vessels have been retrofitted with dual-fuel engines which are extremely effective. Using LPG as fuel also makes the process of transporting LPG easier. First, LPG deck tanks are filled together with the LPG cargo tanks using the cargo system during loading. LPG is then drawn from the deck tanks into a fuel gas supply system and piped to the engine. This increases operational and economic efficiency, especially during long-haul shipping.

In 2020, BW LPG pioneered the world’s first Very Large Gas Carrier (VLGC) that was retrofitted with LPG dual-fuel propulsion technology and the company has the largest VLGC fleet that has been retrofitted with LPG dual fuel propulsion technology. This technology works towards reductions in emissions and a step closer to achieving carbon-neutral shipping.

=== Stirling ===
Since the late 1980s, Swedish shipbuilder Kockums has built a number of successful Stirling engine powered submarines. The submarines store compressed oxygen to allow more efficient and cleaner external fuel combustion when submerged, providing heat for the Stirling engine's operation. The engines are currently used on submarines of the Gotland and Södermanland classes and the Japanese Sōryū-class submarine. These are the first submarines to feature Stirling air-independent propulsion (AIP), which extends the underwater endurance from a few days to several weeks.

The heat sink of a Stirling engine is typically the ambient air temperature. In the case of medium to high power Stirling engines, a radiator is generally required to transfer the heat from the engine to the ambient air. Stirling marine engines have the advantage of using the ambient temperature water. Placing the cooling radiator section in seawater rather than ambient air allows for the radiator to be smaller. The engine's cooling water may be used directly or indirectly for heating and cooling purposes of the ship. The Stirling engine has potential for surface-ship propulsion, as the engine's larger physical size is less of a concern.

=== Hydrogen fuel ===
While currently not commonly used in the maritime industry, hydrogen as a fossil fuel alternative is an area with heavy investment. As of 2018 the shipping company Maersk has pledged to be carbon free by 2050, a goal they plan to achieve partly by investing in hydrogen fuel technology. While hydrogen is a promising fuel, it has a few disadvantages. Hydrogen is far more flammable than other fuels such as diesel, so precautions must be taken. It is also not very energy dense, so it has to be heavily compressed to increase its energy density enough for it to be practical, similar to methane and LNG. Hydrogen can have its power extracted either by use of a fuel cell system or it can be burned in an internal combustion engine, similar to the diesel engines presently used in the maritime industry.

=== Electric ===
Battery-electric propulsion first appeared in the latter part of the 19th century, powering small lake boats. These relied entirely on lead-acid batteries for electric current to power their propellers. Elco (the Electric Launch Company) evolved into the industry leader, later expanding into other forms of vessel, including the iconic World War II PT boat.

In the early part of the 20th century electric propulsion was adapted to use in submarines. As underwater propulsion driven exclusively by heavy batteries was both slow and of limited range and timespan, rechargeable battery banks were developed. Submarines were primarily powered by combined diesel-electric systems on the surface, which were much faster and allowed for dramatically expanded range, charging their battery systems as necessary for still limited subsurface action and duration. The experimental Holland V submarine led to the adoption of this system by the U.S. Navy, followed by the British Royal Navy.

To expand the range and duration of the submarine during World War II the German Kriegsmarine developed a snorkel system, which allowed the diesel-electric system to be utilized while the submarine was all but completely submerged. Finally, in 1952, USS Nautilus was launched, the world's first nuclear powered submarine, which eliminated the restrictions of both diesel fuel and limited duration battery propulsion.

Several short-range ships are built as (or converted to) pure electric vessels. This includes some powered by batteries which are recharged from shore, and some shore-powered by electrical cables, either overhead or submerged (no batteries).

On November 12, 2017 Guangzhou Shipyard International (GSI) launched what may be the world's first all-electric, battery-powered inland coal carrier. The 2,000 dwt vessel will carry bulk cargo for up to 40 nautical miles per charge. The ship carries lithium ion batteries rated at 2,400 kilowatt-hours, about the same amount as 30 Tesla Model S electric sedans.

==== Diesel-electric ====
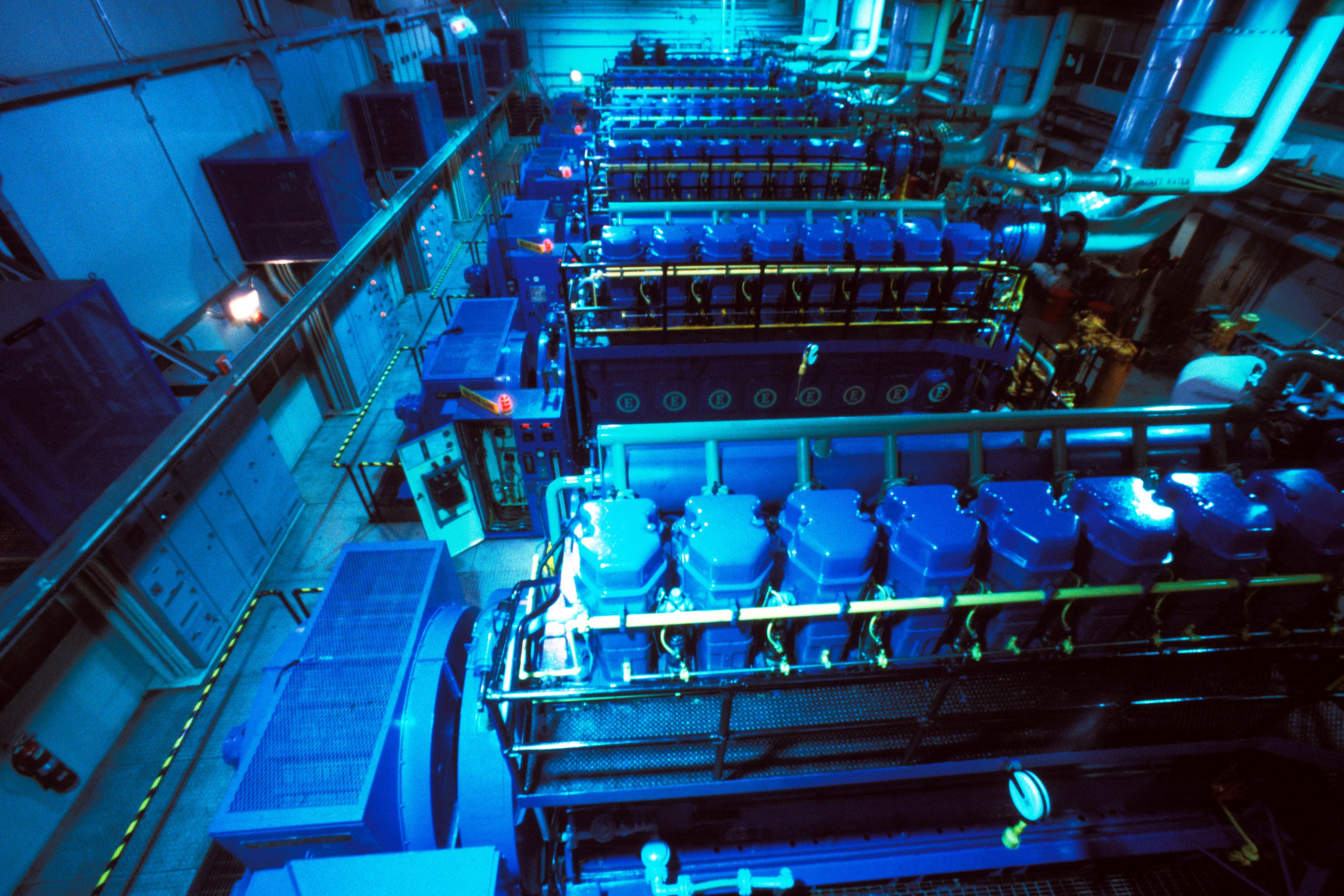
Example of a diesel generator

The diesel-electric transmission of power from the engine to the propeller affords flexibility in distribution of machinery within the vessel at a higher first cost than direct-drive propulsion. It is a preferred solution for vessels that employ pod-mounted propellers for precision positioning or reducing general vibrations by highly flexible couplings. Diesel-electric provides flexibility to assign power output to applications on board, other than propulsion. The first diesel electric ship was the Russian tanker Vandal, launched in 1903.

==== Turbo-electric ====
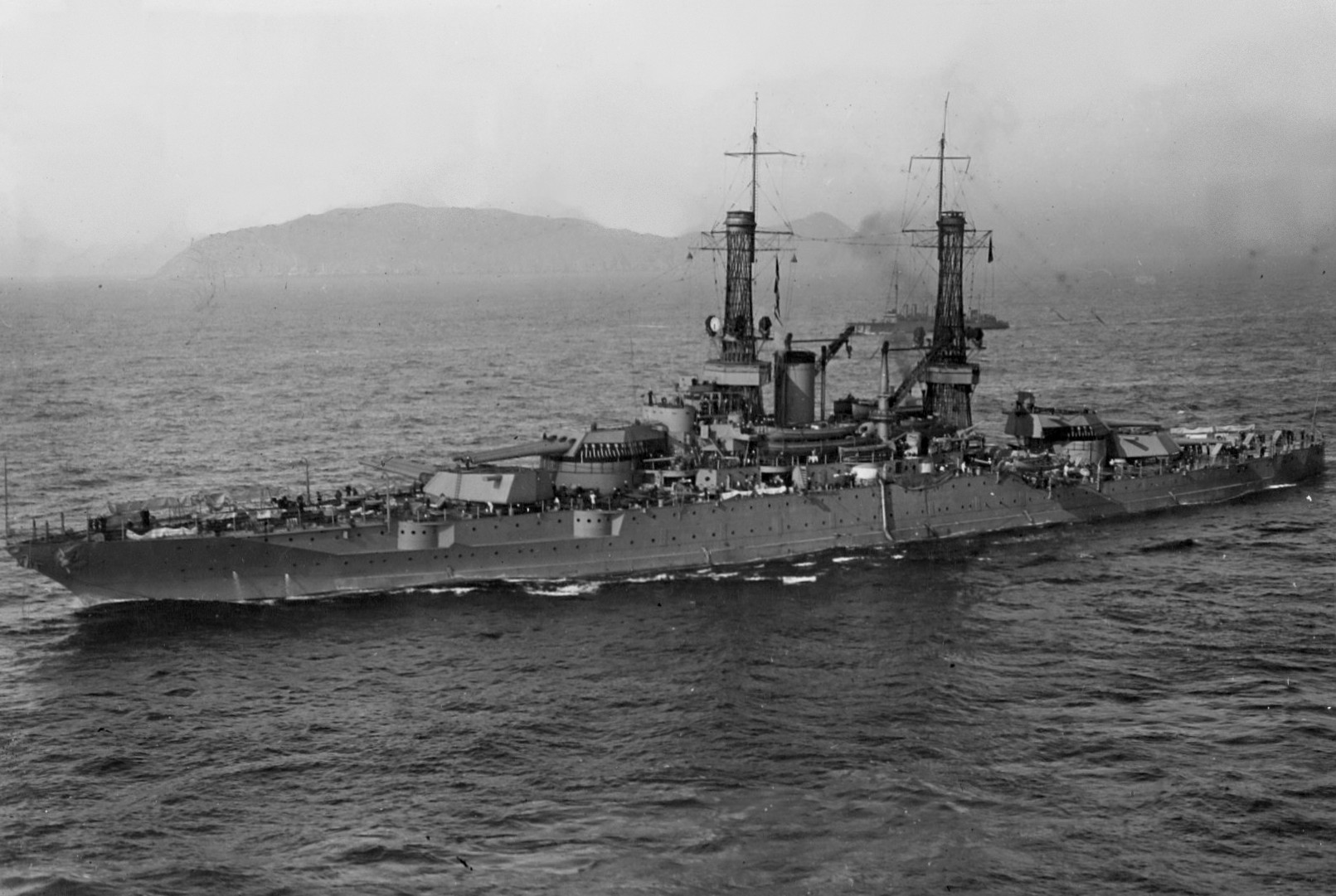
The battleship USS New Mexico, launched in 1917, was the world's first turbo-electric battleship.

Turbo-electric transmission uses electric generators to convert the mechanical energy of a turbine (steam or gas) into electric energy and electric motors to convert it back into mechanical energy to power the driveshafts. An advantage of turbo-electric transmission is that it allows the combination of high-speed turbines with slow turning propellers or wheels, without requiring a gearbox. It can also provide electricity for other electrical systems, such as lighting, computers, radar, and communications equipment.

=== Transmission of power ===
To transmit the rotational force of the shaft into thrust, propellers are most commonly used in today's merchant vessels. The developed thrust from the propeller is transferred to the hull via a thrust bearing.

== Propulsion types ==
Numerous types of propulsion have been developed over time. These include:

=== Oars ===
One of the oldest forms of marine propulsion, oars have been found dating back to 5000-4500 BCE. Oars are used in rowing sports such as rowing, kayaking, canoeing.

=== Propeller ===
Marine propellers are also known as "screws". There are many variations of marine screw systems, including twin, contra-rotating, controllable-pitch, and nozzle-style screws. While smaller vessels tend to have a single screw, even very large ships such as tankers, container ships and bulk carriers may have single screws for reasons of fuel efficiency. Other vessels may have twin, triple or quadruple screws. Power is transmitted from the engine to the screw by way of a propeller shaft, which may be connected to a gearbox. The propeller then moves the vessel by creating thrust. When the propeller rotates the pressure in front of the propeller is lower than the pressure behind the propeller. The force from the pressure difference propels the propeller forward.

=== Paddle wheel ===
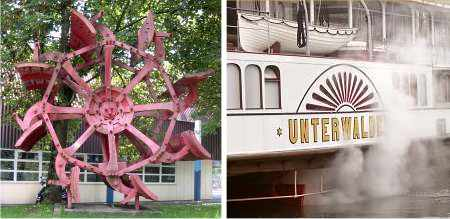
Left: original paddle wheel from a paddle steamer. Right: detail of a paddle steamer.

The paddle wheel is a large wheel, generally built of a steel framework, upon the outer edge of which are fitted numerous paddle blades (called floats or buckets). The bottom quarter or so of the wheel travels underwater. Rotation of the paddle wheel produces thrust, forward or backward as required. More advanced paddle wheel designs have featured feathering methods that keep each paddle blade oriented closer to vertical while it is in the water; this increases efficiency. The upper part of a paddle wheel is normally enclosed in a paddle box to minimize splashing.

Paddle wheels have been superseded by screws, which are a much more efficient form of propulsion. Nevertheless, paddle wheels have two advantages over screws, making them suitable for vessels in shallow rivers and constrained waters: first, they are less likely to be clogged by obstacles and debris; and secondly, when contra-rotating, they allow the vessel to spin around its own vertical axis. Some vessels had a single screw in addition to two paddle wheels, to gain the advantages of both types of propulsion.

=== Pump jet ===
A pump-jet, hydrojet, water jet, or jet drive uses a ducted propeller (axial-flow pump), centrifugal pump, or mixed flow pump to create a jet of water for propulsion.

These incorporate an intake for source water and a nozzle to direct its flow out, generating momentum, and in most cases, employing thrust vectoring to steer the craft.

Pump-jets are found on personal watercraft, high-speed catamaran ferries, shallow-draft river boats, and torpedoes.

=== Sail ===
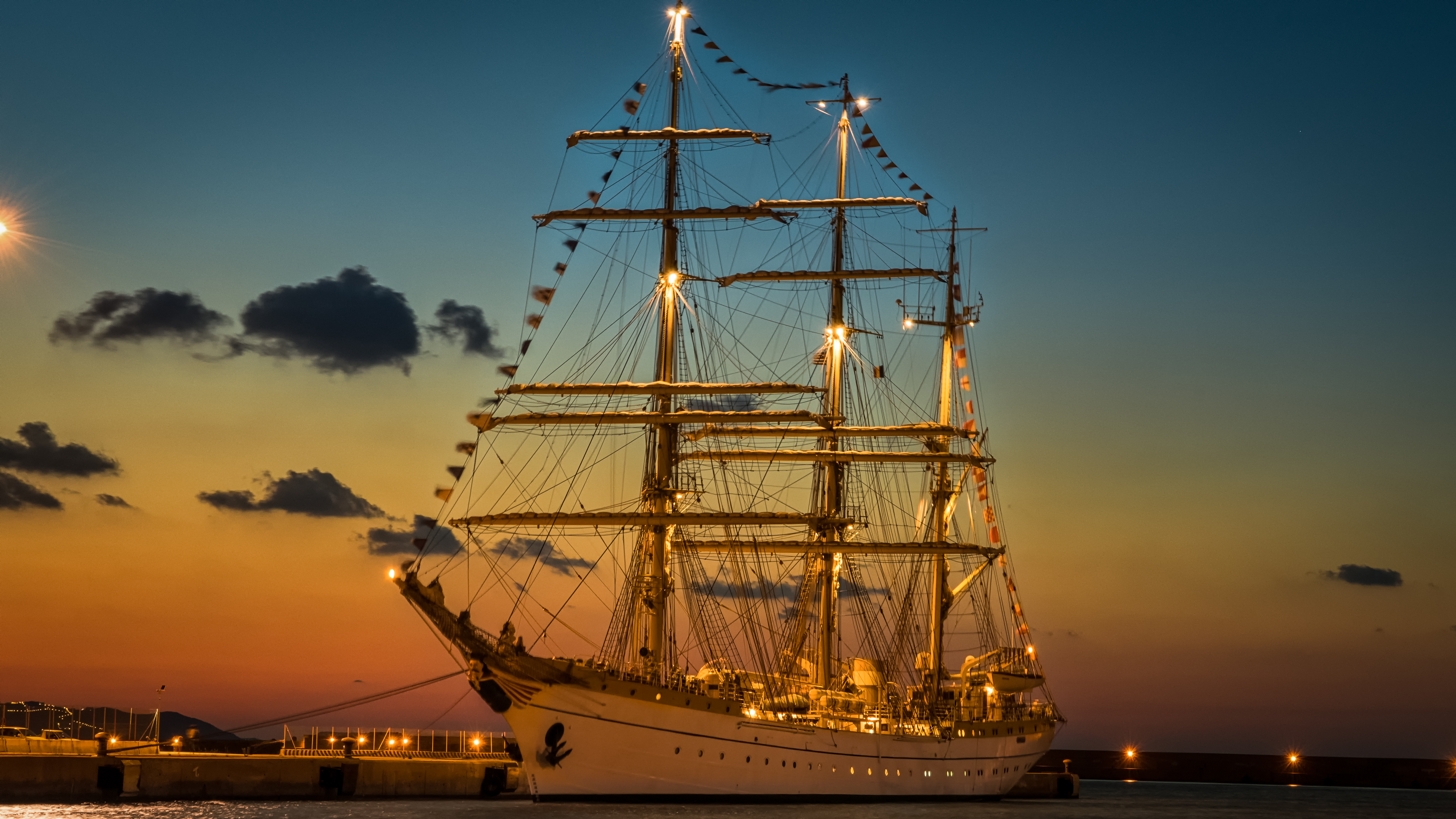
Romanian Sailing Ship Mircea

The purpose of sails is to use wind energy to propel the vessel, sled, board, vehicle or rotor. Depending on the angle of your sail it will be the difference in direction of where your boat is heading and where the wind is going. Dacron was used a lot as a material for sails because of its strong, durable, and easy to maintain. However, when it was being woven into it suffered from weaknesses. Nowadays laminated sails are used to combat sails becoming weak when woven into.

=== Voith-Schneider cyclo-rotor ===
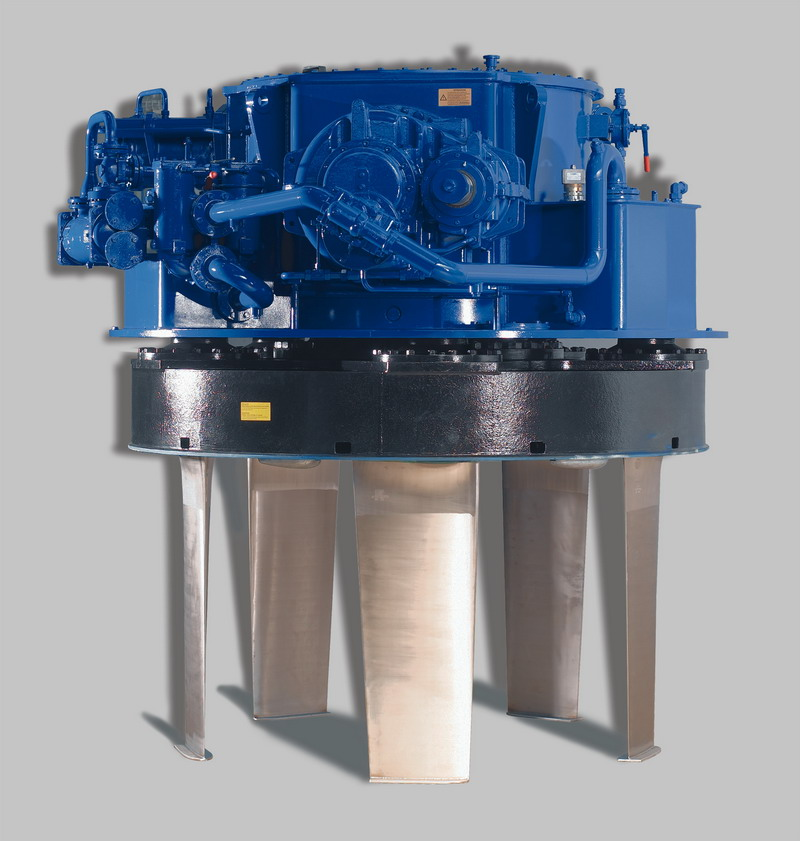
Voith Schneider Propeller

A Voith Schneider Propeller (VSP) is a practical cyclorotor that provides instant thrust in any direction. There is no need to turn a propulsor. Most ships with VSPs do not need or have a rudder. VSPs are often used in tugboats, drilling vessels, and other watercraft that require unusually good maneuverability. First deployed in the 1930s, Voith-Schneider drives are available in large sizes.

=== Caterpillar ===
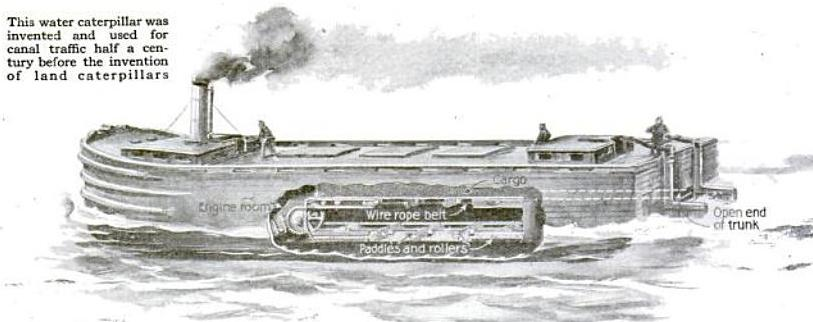
The water caterpillar boat propulsion system (Popular Science Monthly, December 1918)

An early uncommon means of boat propulsion was the water caterpillar. This moved a series of paddles on chains along the bottom of the boat to propel it over the water and preceded the development of tracked vehicles. The first water caterpillar was developed by Joseph-Philibert Desblanc in 1782 and propelled by a steam engine. In the United States the first water caterpillar was patented in 1839 by William Leavenworth of New York.

=== Oscillating flappers ===
In 1997, Gregory S. Ketterman patented a propulsion method of oscillating flappers driven by pedals. The Hobie company markets the propulsion method as the "MirageDrive pedal propulsion system" in its kayaks.

== Buoyancy ==
Underwater gliders convert buoyancy to thrust, using wings, or more recently hull shape (SeaExplorer Glider). Buoyancy is made alternatively negative and positive, generating tooth-saw profiles.

== See also ==
- Air-independent propulsion – Propulsion system for submarines which operates without access to atmospheric oxygen
- Astern propulsion – Use of a ship's propelling mechanism to develop thrust in a retrograde direction
- Combined nuclear and steam propulsion – Class of Russian Guided Missile Cruisers
- Diesel generator – Combination of a diesel engine with an electrical generator
- Experiment (horse-powered boat) – Horse-powered boat
- Integrated electric propulsion – Arrangement of marine propulsion systems that generators generate electricity
- Internal drive propulsion – Form of marine propulsion
- Non-road engine – Internal combustion engine classification
- Nuclear marine propulsion – Propulsion system for marine vessels utilizing a nuclear powerplant
- Wind-assisted propulsion – System for generating thrust for watercraft
- Astro Mechanica – Aircraft propulsion system efficient at a range of speeds higher and lower than sound's
