= Sulzer (manufacturer) =

Global Swiss industrial group based in Winterthur

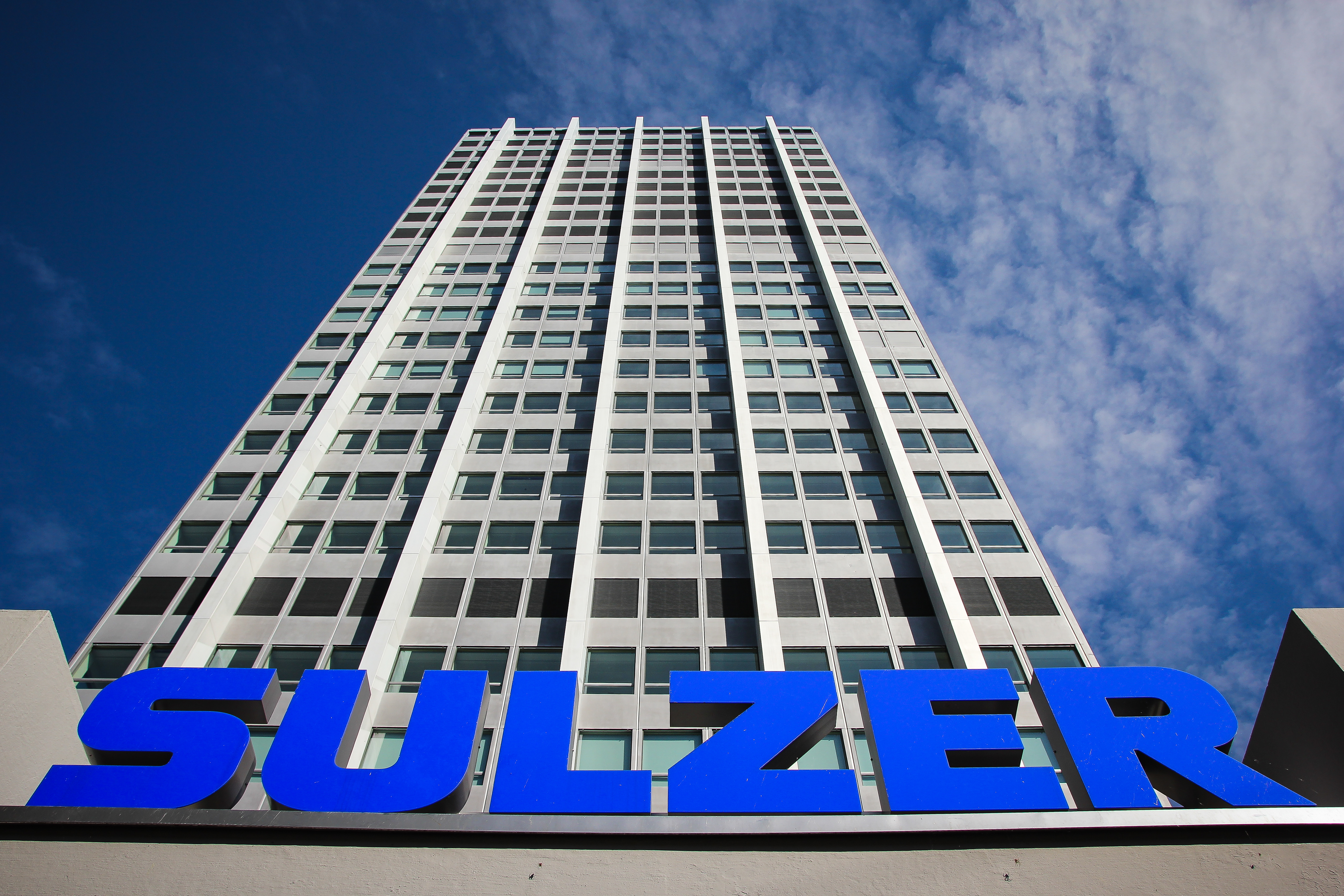
- Sulzer Headquarters Tower in Winterthur, Switzerland
- Type: Public (SIX: SUN)
- ISIN: CH0038388911
- Industry: Industrial engineering and manufacturing
- Founded: 1775; 251 years ago 1834; 192 years ago in Winterthur, Switzerland as Sulzer Brothers Ltd.
- Founder: Salomon Sulzer-Bernet
- Headquarters: Winterthur, Switzerland
- Key people: Suzanne Thoma; Executive Chair
- Products: Pumps, industrial agitators, static mixers, compressors, products for wastewater treatment, separation processes, plant engineering, rotating equipment service, PLA bioplastics
- Revenue: 3.3 Billion CHF (2023)
- Number of employees: 13,130 (end of 2023)
- Divisions: Flow Equipment Services Chemtech
- Website: www.sulzer.com

Sulzer Ltd. [ˈzʊlt͡sɐ] is a Swiss industrial engineering and manufacturing firm, founded by Salomon Sulzer-Bernet in 1775 and established as Sulzer Brothers Ltd. (Gebrüder Sulzer) in 1834 in Winterthur, Switzerland. Today it is a publicly traded company with some 180 manufacturing facilities and service centers around the world. The company's shares are listed on the Swiss Stock Exchange.

Sulzer specializes in technologies for fluids of all types. The company's inventions includes the first precision valve steam engine (1876), the Sulzer diesel engine (1898) and artificial hip joints (1965). Sulzer Brothers helped develop shuttleless weaving and their core business in the 1970s and 1980s was loom manufacturing. Rudolf Diesel worked for Sulzer in 1879 and in 1893 Sulzer bought certain rights to diesel engines. Sulzer built their first diesel engine in 1898.

== Organization ==
=== Corporate structure ===
The company is organized into three divisions:

- Flow: Pumping solutions - it produces pumps, agitators, compressors, grinders, screens and filters for water, power generation, oil and gas, hydrocarbon, paper, food, metals and fertilizer industries.
- Services: Full-spectrum service provider for pumps, compressors, turbines, motors and generators for Sulzer's own equipment and third party equipment operated by customers.
- Chemtech: mass transfer, static mixing and polymer solutions for chemicals, petrochemicals, refining and LNG. Also provides a range of ecological solutions such as bio-based chemicals, polymers and fuels, recycling technologies for textiles and plastic, as well as carbon capture and utilization/storage.

=== Ownership structure ===
The Sulzer Ltd shares are registered at the SIX Swiss Exchange. As of 29 May 2018, Tiwel Holding AG (controlled by Renova Group) held a total of 48.82% of Sulzer's share capital.

=== Board of directors ===
Sulzer’s Board of Directors consists of seven members. Each member of the Board of Directors is individually elected or re-elected by Sulzer’s shareholders at the company’s Annual General Meeting.

The current members of the Board of Directors of Sulzer Ltd are:

- Suzanne Thoma, Chairwoman of the Board of Directors (since 2022), member since 2021
- Alexey Moskov, Member of the Board of Directors (since 2020)
- David Metzger, Member of the Board of Directors (since 2021)
- Markus Kammüller, Member of the Board of Directors (since 2022)
- Prisca Havranek-Kosicek (since 2023)
- Hariolf Kottmann (since 2023)
- Per Utnegaard (since 2023)

There are currently five standing committees in the Board of Directors: the Audit Committee, the Nomination Committee, the Remuneration Committee, the Strategy and Sustainability Committee, and the Governance Committee.

=== Executive committee ===
The Executive Committee consists of the Chief Executive Officer (CEO), the Chief Financial Officer (CFO), the Chief Human Resources Officer and three Division Presidents.

The current members of the Executive Committee of Sulzer Ltd are:

- Dr. Suzanne Thoma, Executive Chair (since November 2022)
- Thomas Zickler, CFO (since 2022)
- Haining Auperin, Chief Human Resources Officer (since 2023)
- Tim Schulten, Division President Chemtech (since 2024; previously Division President Services, from 2022)
- Mathias Prüssing, Division President Flow (since 2025)
- Ravin Pillay-Ramsamy, Division President Services (since 2024)

== History ==
=== Formation and growth ===
The company Gebrüder Sulzer, Foundry in Winterthur was founded in 1834 by Johann Jacob Sulzer. His sons, Johann Jakob and Salomon produced cast iron and built fire extinguishers, pumps and apparatus for the textile industry; later, they also started installing heaters. In 1836 the workforce grew to some forty journeymen, subworkers and apprentices. In 1839, a foundry was added, a mechanical workshop was set up, and the first steam engine was built and installed in Winterthur (1841). In 1845, the company's own "Sick Support Association for Factory Workers" was founded. This later became the Sulzer Health Insurance Fund; this was renamed Provita in 1997 and now operates as an independent health insurance fund as part of the SWICA insurance company. In 1851, English engineer Charles Brown joined Sulzer. With the development of new steam engines, he was instrumental for the early success and growth of the company. In 1859, the first "partnership agreement" between the Sulzer brothers was signed. New products were introduced, first steam engines, later also ships, a new organization and production methods. In approximately 1860, Sulzer opened its first foreign sales office in Turin, and the company participated in the world exhibition in Paris in 1867. The workforce had grown by then to more than 1,000 workers.

In 1870, Switzerland's first company-owned vocational school with training workshops was founded. In 1872, 24 workers' dwellings were built in Winterthur by the “Gesellschaft für Erstellung billiger Wohnhäuser” (Society for Affordable Housing Construction). Further apartment buildings in addition to private homes followed in other parts of Winterthur.

From 1880, steam engines particularly contributed to the growth of Sulzer to around 2,000 employees. In 1881 a branch was founded in Ludwigshafen am Rhein, Germany. In 1898, the first Sulzer diesel engine was developed in cooperation with Rudolf Diesel. By approximately 1900, the company had over 3,000 employees and sales offices in Milan, Paris, Cairo, London, Moscow and Bucharest, as well as the Japanese city of Kobe from 1914.

As a family business, the company had grown over the years in the form of a general partnership, and in June 1914 it was converted into two stock corporations with registered offices in Winterthur and Ludwigshafen am Rhein, both of which were renamed Gebrüder Sulzer Aktiengesellschaft. In 1917, both companies were bundled in a holding structure under the name Sulzer-Unternehmungen AG and subsequently the foreign sales offices were also transferred to independent companies. Sulzer initiates Switzerland’s first regularly published in-house magazine in 1919. At the same time, the technical customer magazine “Technische Rundschau Sulzer” (later “Sulzer Technical Review”) was launched.

During the 1930s, production fell by two thirds as a result of the global economic crisis, and personnel was massively reduced.

=== World War II ===
Out of political and personal considerations, Sulzer decided to sell its subsidiaries in Germany by the beginning of the war.

Sulzer was blacklisted by the Allies during World War II due to an increase in trade with Axis countries. Sulzer refused to sign an agreement to limit the future sale of marine diesel engines to the Axis countries, and was blacklisted by the Allies as a result.

=== Postwar period ===
From 1945, a growth phase began with a flourishing economy and strong expansion of foreign activities. In the 1950s, increasing production was carried out by guest workers, mainly from southern Europe. New divisions for energy, plant engineering and textile machinery were created, accompanied by better working conditions, expansion of social benefits, women's work for "lighter factory work" and housing subsidies in surrounding communities.

During the second heyday after the Second World War, the Sulzer Tower was built in the early 1960s - the company's new headquarters, a landmark of Winterthur and at 99.7 meters the tallest building in Switzerland at the time. It served as Sulzer’s headquarters until 1999, and again from 2012.

In 1961, Swiss Locomotive and Machine Works (SLM) in Winterthur was acquired, and the large diesel engine became Sulzer's flagship product worldwide. In 1966, Sulzer acquired a 53 percent stake in Escher Wyss & Cie. in Zurich, reaching an all-time high of over 30,000 employees. In 1969, Escher Wyss AG was taken over in full.

=== Crisis in the 1970s and 1980s ===
In the 1970s, the oil crisis announced a new orientation towards the technology group and the development of materials technologies. Sulzer reacted to the global decline in capital goods in the 1970s after losses in the second half of the 1980s. In 1982, the weaving machine business was expanded.

In 1984, the year of its 150th anniversary, Sulzer recorded losses and underwent massive restructuring.

Medical technology was expanded by the purchase of the American Intermedics Group for one billion Swiss francs in 1988. The Winterthur machine factory was closed in 1990 and the founding site in Winterthur was vacated. For the first time, Sulzer employed more people abroad than in Switzerland. On 14 May 1993 Gebrüder Sulzer, Aktiengesellschaft was renamed Sulzer Ltd. In 1996, a technology center was built in the Oberwinterthur Industrial Park.

=== Acquisitions and divestitures around the turn of the millennium ===
In 1997, Sulzer Medica went public, and Sulzer Thermtec (equipment and valves for power plants) was sold to the British IMI.

In 1999, another reorganization took place and Sulzer Industries became independent with its own CEO. The pumps business in China was strengthened by founding a joint venture with Dalian Pumps. The company sold its water turbine business (Sulzer Hydra) to the Austrian technology company VA Tech.

In 2000, Sulzer acquired the Finnish company Ahlstrom Pumps. In the middle of the year, the steam locomotive and machine factory DLM became independent, the remains of the former SLM became Winpro AG in 2001 through a management buyout.

In 2001, patients experienced problems with contaminated hip joint implants from Sulzer Medica in the USA, leading to class action lawsuits. In 2002, Sulzer Medica agreed on a settlement with the US plaintiffs and Sulzer paid 75 million US dollars for the settlement, which caused a massive drop in its share price.

In 2001, Sulzer sold its textile business (Sulzer Textile) to the Italian Promatech Group. Sulzer Medica was separated from the Sulzer company through a spin-off in 2001, renamed to Centerpulse and sold to the US medical company Zimmer in 2003, where it is still managed as a successful business unit. With the sale of the compressor business Burckhardt to its management in 2002, the divestiture program was finished.

=== A new start ===
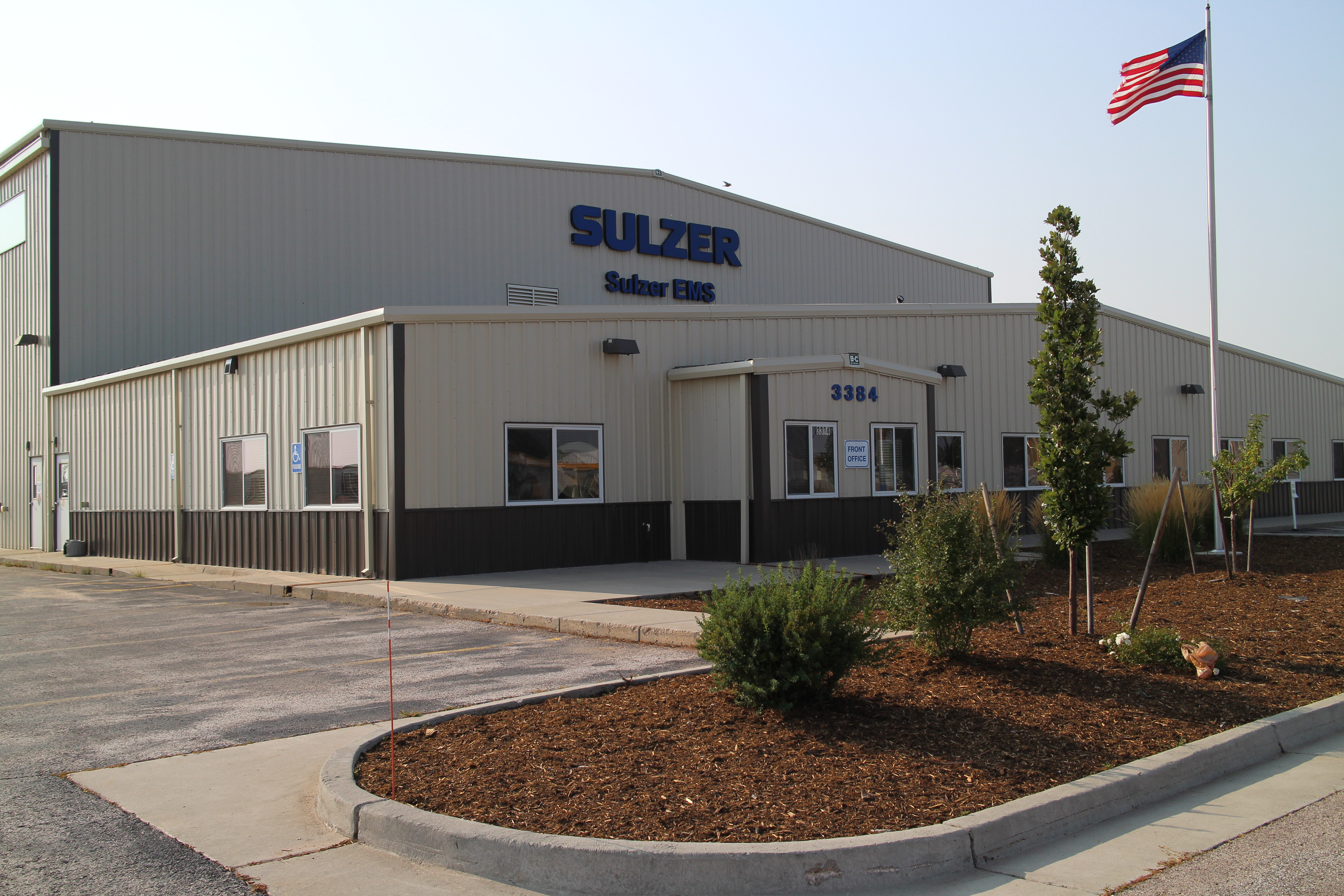
Sulzer in Gillette, Wyoming

The time since 2003 is called a new beginning. Since then, the Group has been smaller but more profitable and has recorded strong growth. Sulzer increased operating income and net income by more than 50 percent.

In the years to come, Sulzer strengthened the market positions of its divisions by several acquisitions. The company’s Metco business acquired the Canadian Ambeon division of Westaim and German OSU Machine Construction in 2004. The same year, Sulzer Pumps took over the Johnston, Crown, and Paco pump activities from Precision Castparts Corp. (PCC), located in Houston, Texas, USA, and in Wuxi, China. Sulzer Chemtech acquired US Cana-Tex in 2005, strengthening its field services for separation columns, Swiss companies Mixpac, Werfo and Mold in 2006 to expand static mixing activities, followed by the separation business of UK-based KnitMesh Ltd in 2007 and several tower field service companies in Australia, Thailand, India, Germany in 2009 and Canada in 2011. Sulzer’s service business (Turbo Services) expanded its business in South America in 2008 with the acquisition of Capime.

In 2005, a Swiss-government sponsored historical study authored by historian Peter Hug revealed that Sulzer helped provide the means to enrich fissile material in the 1970s for the South African nuclear weapons program. Following discussions with the Division of Trade of the Federal Department of Economic Affairs (DEA), Sulzer said to only supply important parts for uranium enrichment plants to South Africa on condition that the International Atomic Energy Agency (IAEA) would be allowed to surveil South Africa. Otherwise, the company would only deliver non-sensitive equipment. Meanwhile, the Swiss Federation of Commerce and Industry intervened in the debate and indirectly exerted pressure in favor of admitting the deal. Later, when it became known that compressors had been supplied to an enrichment plant in South Africa, Sulzer claimed its South African subsidiary, over which it did not exert any control legally, might have supplied such compressors and that Sulzer had not been informed about that.

In 2007, the Viennese investors Ronny Pecik and Georg Stumpf together with the Russian oligarch Viktor Vekselberg acquired a majority stake in Sulzer. None of these investors had ever filed a disclosure statement with Sulzer before. This surprising entry drew the longest investigation by the Swiss Financial Market Supervisory Authority (FINMA), at the end of which a charge of breach of disclosure obligations resulted. The investors had taken advantage of a loophole in Swiss capital market regulations and, through the improper use of formally cash-settled options, had granted themselves potential control over voting rights attached to shares or conveyed by options with real settlement. FINMA also found that Zürcher Kantonalbank (ZKB), Deutsche Bank AG Zweigniederlassung Zürich (DBZ) and NZB Neue Zürcher Bank (NZB) had, in some cases, seriously breached their regulatory obligations in connection with the issuance or trading of these options.

In 2010, Sulzer acquired Dowding & Mills, a provider of maintenance and repair services for generators and engines, and renamed it Sulzer Electro Mechanical Services.

In spring 2011, Sulzer announced the acquisition of the Cardo Flow Solutions pump division of the Swedish company Assa Abloy for CHF 858 million, thus strengthening the Sulzer Pumps division in the water and wastewater market. The deal added the ABS and Scanpumps brands to Sulzer's workforce with 1,800 new employees.

In July 2013, Sulzer announced its intention to divest the fourth division "Sulzer Metco" to focus on its core markets. The purpose was also to fund new acquisitions and to grow production capacity. In June 2014, the sale of "Sulzer Metco" to the Swiss Oerlikon was completed.

In 2017, Sulzer bought French pump manufacturer Ensival Moret to close specific product gaps (such as axial flow pumps) in its general industry pumps portfolio. The company also acquired control of Rotec’s gas turbine service business (Rotec GT) in Russia, becoming a sizeable player in the Russian gas turbine service market. The same year, Sulzer’s Chemtech division bought Wärtsilä’s oil separation technology business (VIEC – Vessel Internal Electrostatic Coalescer), based in Norway.

After two years with three divisions, Sulzer added a fourth division to its reporting structure at the beginning of 2017. Since then, the Sulzer Mixpac Systems unit, which has been manufacturing applicators for industrial adhesives since 2006, has formed the new Applicator Systems Division together with the acquired beauty business Geka (bought in 2016), industrial dispensers provider PC Cox (2016), dental applicators producer Transcodent (2017), healthcare dispensing/mixing products supplier Medmix (2018), and drug delivery devices manufacturer Haselmeier (2020).

In 2018, Sulzer acquired US company JWC Environmental, LLC, a provider of solids reduction and removal products such as grinders, screens and dissolved air flotation system for municipal, industrial and commercial wastewater applications. The transaction allowed Sulzer to grow its wastewater treatment segment.

Also in 2018, Sulzer took over Brithinee Electric of Colton, California, expanding its electromechanical services business into Southern California to serve the wind, cement and water markets.

Although Sulzer was not directly listed on OFAC's sanctions list in April 2018, it was negatively affected by them because Russian oligarch Viktor Vekselberg controlled 63.42% of the industrial conglomerate through Renova, a financial company he controls. In order to avoid Sulzer being indirectly exposed to US sanctions, the company submitted a request to the Office of Foreign Assets Control (OFAC) to take over five million shares from Renova, which was granted on 11 April. In this way, Vekselberg's shareholding fell to just below 50%, which no longer corresponded to a majority. With this measure, Sulzer was able to free itself from the sphere of influence of the American sanctions within a few days. On 12 April 2018 the company reported, "Transfer of shares completed - Renova ownership below 50% - Sulzer free from US sanctions."

With the acquisition of the US-headquartered GTC Technology in April 2019, Sulzer complemented its Chemtech offering with proprietary processes and systems for the production of aromatics and other petrochemicals. This acquisition enabled Sulzer to get into the technology licensing business, thus making Sulzer’s business less cyclical.

Sulzer grew its aftermarket activities in July 2019 through the acquisition of Alba Power, a service provider for aeroderivative gas turbines. By diversifying its service offering, Sulzer reduced its end-market exposure to the challenging utility power sector.

In 2020, Sulzer acquired Swiss-German Haselmeier, providing the company access to the highly attractive drug-delivery devices market with self-injection pens for reproductive health, diabetes or osteoporosis patients.

In January 2021, Sulzer bought Nordic Water, a leading supplier of water-treatment technology. The acquisition strengthened Sulzer’s wastewater treatment offering and gave further access to the clean water market, where Sulzer has already been present for years.

In September 2021, Sulzer spun off Medmix as a completely separate firm, thereby narrowing Sulzer to a flow-control company focused on the Water and Renewables markets.

== Rail traction ==
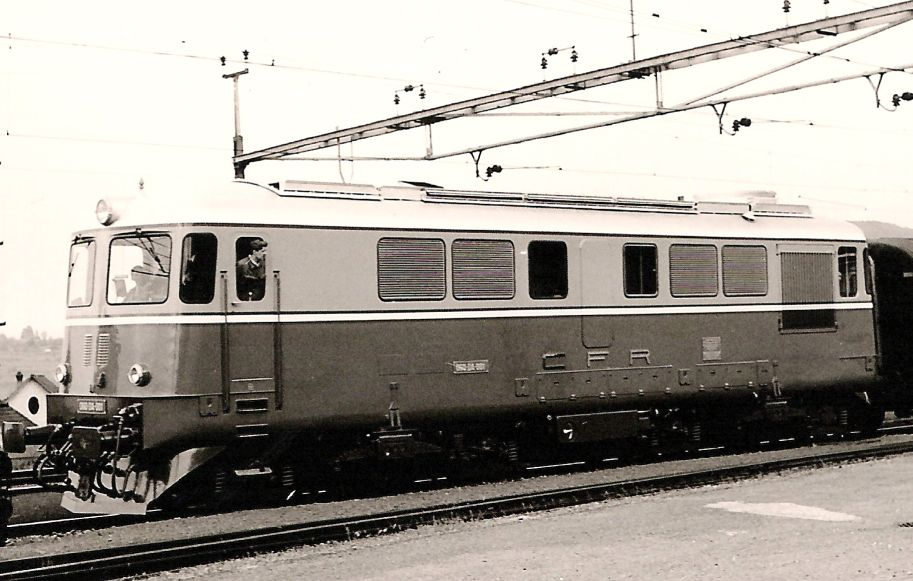
First Romanian Railways CFR Class 60 locomotive built in Switzerland

Sulzer developed a series of rail traction engines in the 1930s and 1940s which were used extensively in diesel locomotives in the UK, Europe and South America. A small number were used in locomotives in Africa and Australia. The Sulzer LDA (prefixed by the number of cylinders, and with a suffix related to the cylinder bore) engine was widely used by British Rail and Romanian Railways. Many were built under licence by Vickers-Armstrong at Barrow as six-, eight- and twelve-cylinder form, and in Romania, by Reșița works for Electroputere Craiova. The twelve-cylinder engine was used in the British Rail Class 47, Romanian Railways Class 60/62, Polish Railways Class ST43, China Railways ND2, and several others. The 12LDA28 engine was a double bank engine having, in effect, two six-cylinder engines side by side, rather than a V-type as favoured by many other manufacturers. Sulzer V-type engines for rail use bore the type number LVA (with a 50-degree angle between the banks).

In the late 1970s, locomotive rebuilder Morrison Knudsen installed a series of Sulzer power units into several existing locomotives. The first applications were of the marine based 6ASL25/30 & 8ASL25/30 series used in a Morrison-Knudsen demonstrator and four M-K TE70-4S units for the Southern Pacific. This was merely reworking of an existing design into a new application

Ten 16 ASV25/30 3,600 hp (2,700 kW) power units were installed into locomotives belonging to the Atchison, Topeka & Santa Fe and the Union Pacific. Teething problems plagued these machines and their operation in revenue earning service was brief. Research into correcting their problems continued but was eventually curtailed by Morrison Knudsen late in 1982. These power units were descendants of the LVA range.

== New Sulzer Diesel ==
In 1990, Sulzer spun off the diesel engine division into a separate company named "New Sulzer Diesel" (NSD) and sold most of the shares in it, retaining only a minority ownership. In 1997, NSD was absorbed by Wärtsilä, creating Wärtsilä NSD. Wärtsilä NSD makes the world's largest diesel engine, the Wärtsilä-Sulzer RTA96-C. They are also one of the few companies that create a camshaftless intelligent diesel main propulsion engine.
