= ND2 =

ND2 may refer to:

- China Railways ND2 diesel-electric locomotive
- MT-ND2, NADH dehydrogenase subunit 2
- Neutral density filter (ND) with an attenuation factor of 2
- North Dakota's 2nd congressional district
