= Vandal (ship) =

Vandal may refer to the following ships:

- HMS Vandal (P64), British submarine launched in 1942 and lost in 1943
- Vandal (tanker), Russian diesel-powered tanker launched in 1903
