= Suzanne Thoma =

Swiss chemical engineer and business executive (born 1962)

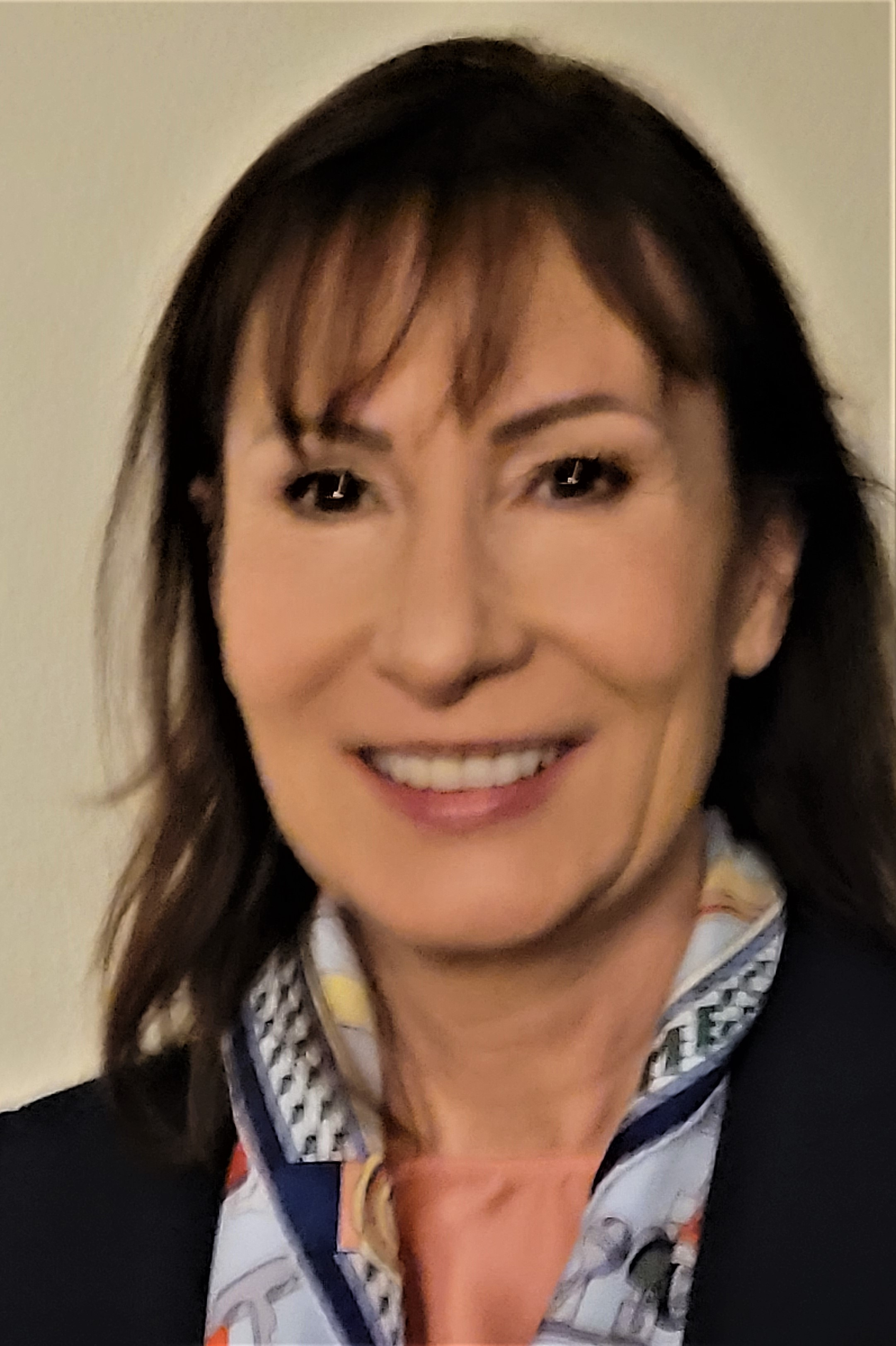
- Thoma in 2022
- Born: February 1, 1962 (age 64); Zug, Switzerland
- Citizenship: Swiss
- Education: ETH Zurich (Doktorin der Technischen Wissenschaften)
- Occupations: Businesswoman; chemical engineer
- Known for: Sulzer Ltd.
- Title: Chairwomen and CEO of Sulzer Ltd.
- Children: 2

Suzanne Alice Thoma (born 1962) is a Swiss chemical engineer, businesswoman and manager. She is Chairwoman and CEO of Sulzer Ltd., an industrial company listed on the SIX Swiss Exchange.

== Early life and education ==
Suzanne Thoma grew up in Zug as the daughter of a physicist at ETH Zurich. After completing secondary school, she studied chemical engineering at ETH Zurich and earned her Doctor of Technical Sciences (PhD) degree in 1989 with the dissertation Interactions between macro- and micromixing in stirred tank reactors under the supervision of John Russel Bourne at the same institution.

== Career ==
Beginning in 1990, she worked at Ciba Specialty Chemicals (acquired by BASF in 2009) in various roles until 2002. She joined BKW Energie (formerly Bernische Kraftwerke) in 2010 as head of the network division. In 2013, she became CEO of the company and led a strategically planned repositioning of BKW. As part of this effort, she implemented the shutdown of the company owned Mühleberg Nuclear Power Plant in 2019 for economic reasons. However, BKW’s original plan had envisioned building a powerful next generation replacement nuclear plant. After Switzerland’s political decision to phase out nuclear energy, this project was no longer feasible. She expanded BKW’s electrical installation business by acquiring 130 small and medium sized engineering firms and energy service providers in Switzerland and abroad. After being elected to the board of directors of Sulzer Ltd. in 2021, Thoma left BKW to join Sulzer and became chairwoman of the board in April 2022. As of 2022, she additionally assumed the role of CEO. In her dual capacity, Thoma appointed new members to Sulzer’s management team to realign the company. In 2024 the company presented a new strategy, Sulzer 2028, setting targets for growth and profitability. Sulzer's share price rose substantially over the following period.

== Other activities ==
- Vice-Chair of Avenir Suisse, a Swiss foundation
- Member of the Swiss Academy of Engineering Sciences
- Board member and investor Swiss Ventures Group AG, Zurich
- Member of the Board of Trustees ETH Foundation

== Awards ==
- 2021 Honorary Councillor ETH Zurich
