= China Railways ND2 =

Romanian diesel-electric locomotive used in China

ND2
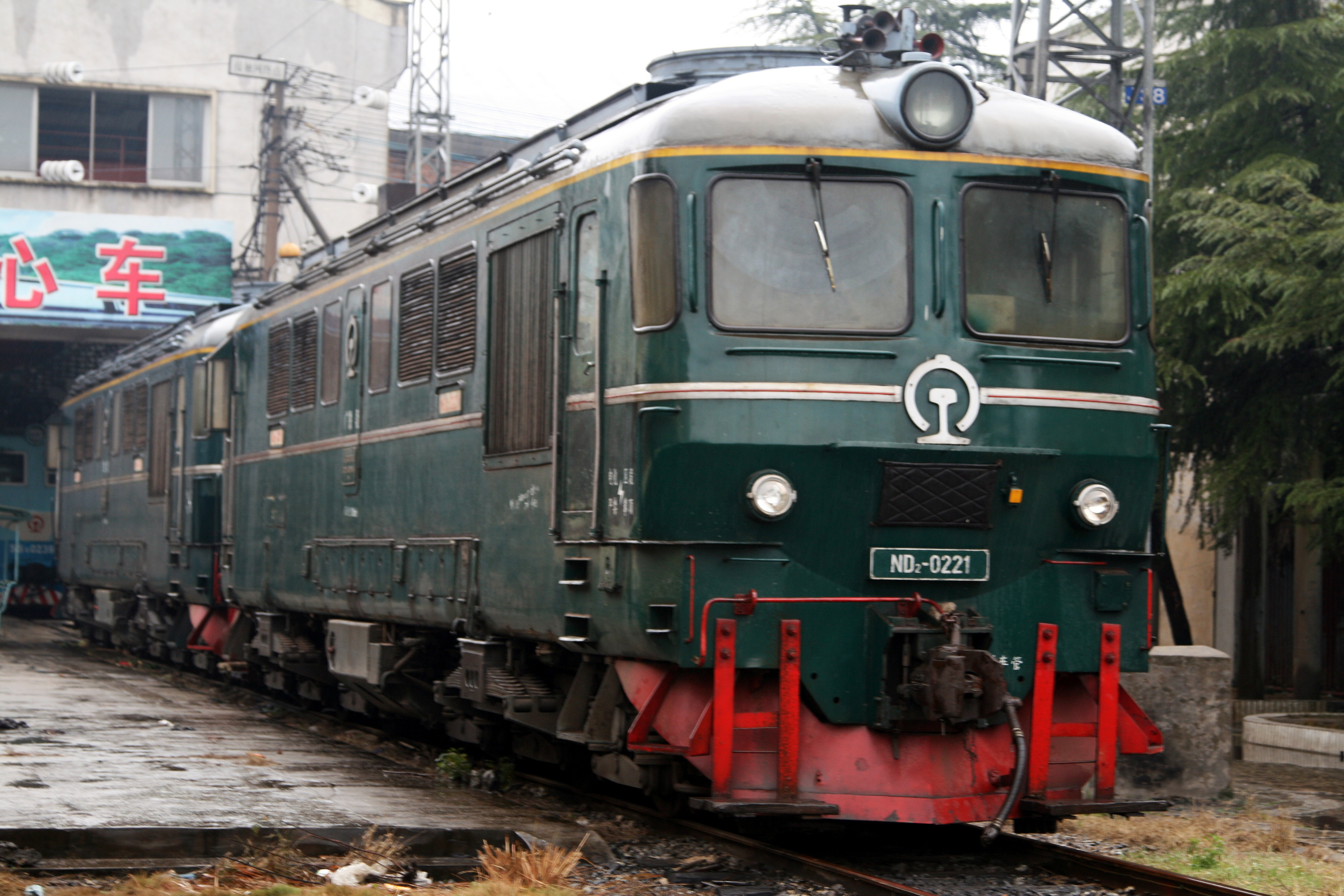
- ND2-0221
Type and origin
- Power type: Diesel-electric
- Builder: ElectroputereRomania
- Build date: 1972 - 1987
- Total produced: 284
Specifications
- Configuration
  - UIC: Co′Co′
- Gauge: 1,435 mm (4 ft 8 1/2 in)
- Length: 16,910 mm (55 ft 6 in)
- Width: 3,090 mm (10 ft 2 in)
- Height: 4,435 mm (14 ft 6.6 in)
- Axle load: 20.2 t (45,000 lb)
- Loco weight: 118 t (260,000 lb)
- Fuel type: Diesel
- Fuel capacity: 4,690 L (1,240 US gal)
- Water cap.: 1,420 L (380 US gal)
- Prime mover: 12LDA28B
- Generator: GCE1100/10F
- Traction motors: 6× GDTM533F
- Transmission: electric (DC/DC)
Performance figures
- Maximum speed: 120 km/h (75 mph)
- Power output: 1,546 kW (2,073 hp)
- Tractive effort
  - Starting: 280 kN (63,000 lbf)
  - Continuous: 169 kN (38,000 lbf)
Career
- Operators: China Railway
- Numbers: ND2 0001-0284

ND2 is the name for a Romanian diesel-electric locomotive, produced by Electroputere, exported to and employed in China by China Railway. It was made for the purpose of heavy transport.

== History ==
ND2 is a derivative of LDE2100 (060DA) locomotive. The Chinese Ministry of Railways started importing this locomotive in 1974 under a barter arrangement to fill a gap in the domestic locomotive production.

Most of the class were based at Shanghai Bureau, with some others working as far south as Guangzhou. At its apex, ND2 class was the predominant passenger power south of Yangtze River.

Rated at 2300 hp UIC, ND2 traces its lineage back to a Swiss design created by SLM and Sulzer. Externally, ND2 bears resemblance to Ae 6/6 Swiss electric locomotives.

=== Production ===
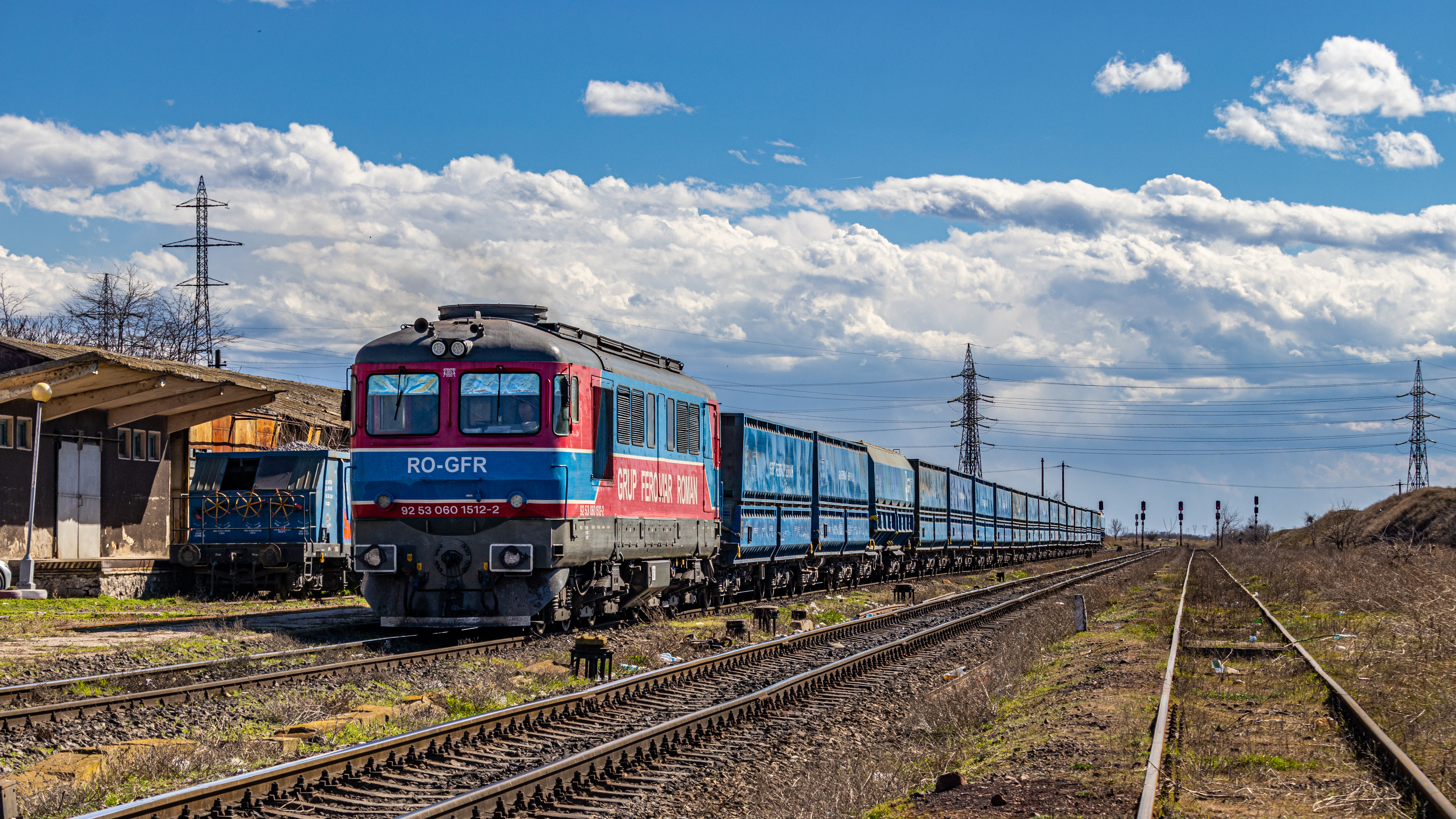
DA1512, an ex-ND2 locomotive owned by GFR with a freight train in Năvodari station

A total number of 284 ND2 locomotives were produced. The ND2s are now being withdrawn but a few were exported back to Romania. Romanian private freight operator GFR now operates a few ND2 locomotives that were exported back to Romania, repainted and had their couplers changed.
