= Intelligent Diesel Engine =

Camless marine 2-stroke engines for ships

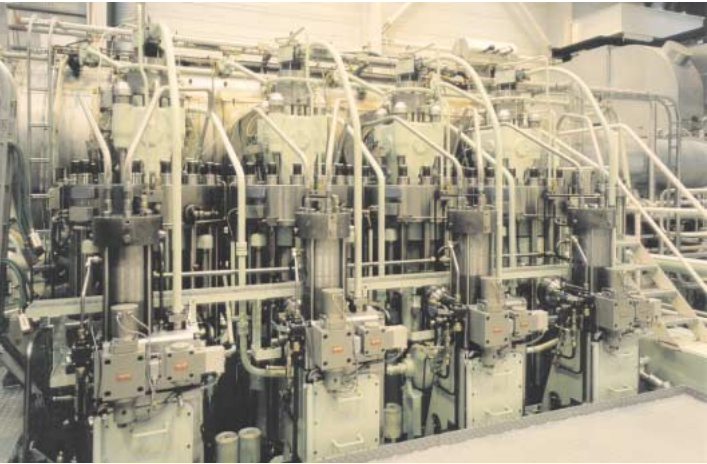
MAN intelligent diesel

MAN B&W diesel and New Sulzer Diesel have developed “smart” camshaftless engines utilizing electronically controlled fuel injection and exhaust valve actuation systems.

== Intelligent System ==
The concept of the intelligent engine revolves around the idea that the engine is thinking for itself. The brain of the system is an electronic control system that analyzes the condition of the engine and the operation of the engine’s system (The fuel injection, exhaust valve, cylinder lube oil and turbo charging system). Along with the control and timing needed to make the diesel run smoothly, the intelligent diesel goes beyond that by monitoring and evaluating the condition of the engine, based on engine conditions the smart system can actively protect the engine from damage due to overload, lack of maintenance and maladjustment. The intelligent engines’ finite control gives the bridge the ability to manually adjust more variables than the current camshaft system. Along with manual controls, operators can specifically design programs that optimize fuel economy, emission, turbo output, allowing for high performance under different loads.

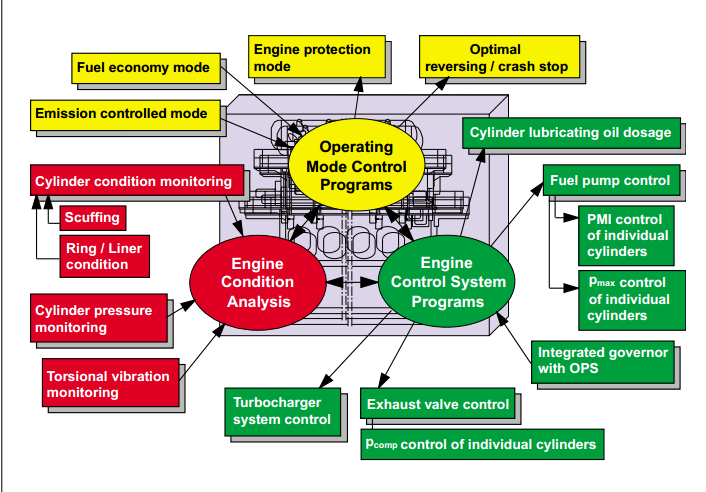

== Replacing the Camshaft ==
The convenience of the camshaft is that not only does it keep the timing of the opening and closing valves and injecting fuel through its cams, it is also responsible for the mechanical force that is required to actually open and close the valves and power the port and helix fuel pump. The camshaftless intelligent system uses the rotation of the engine to power an axial piston pump that pressurizes a hydraulic oil system. The potential energy from the hydraulic pressure is directed by the electronically controlled servo system to drive InFI (Intelligent Fuel Injection) and InVA (Intelligent Valve Actuation) systems.

== Improving the Marine Diesel Engine ==
The intelligent, camshaftless Diesel engines offer several potential improvements for marine diesel main engines such as variable electronically controlled timing of fuel injection and exhaust valves for lower specific fuel consumption and higher performance. The electronic controls also offer lower RPM for manoeuvering, including better astern and crash stop performance. With the smarter InFI system the ship operator can more precisely control fuel consumption and improve emission characteristics. The highly integrated monitoring system allows for the potential of longer time between overhauls by equalizing the thermal load between cylinders.

== The Smart Diesel in Service ==
The Bow Cecil chemical tanker was one of the first ships built with an Intelligent main propulsion engine. The success of the MAN diesel 7S50ME-c engine in Bow Cecil, proved to the industry that intelligent diesel is a viable option.
