= Greg Ketterman =

Boat Designer

Greg Ketterman is a United States multihull sailboat designer.

== Designs ==
- Hobie Adventure Island

== See also ==
- Trimaran
- Polyreme
