= Vandal (tanker) =

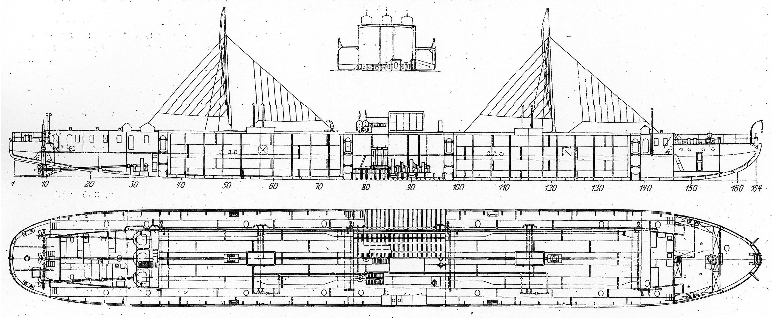
- Drawings of Vandal
- Name: Vandal
- Owner: Branobel
- Launched: 1903
- Completed: 1903
- Decommissioned: 1913
- Type: River tanker
- Tonnage: 800 tons
- Length: 244.5 ft (74.5 m)
- Beam: 31.34 ft (9.55 m)
- Draught: 8 ft (2.4 m)
- Propulsion: 3 diesel engines, 120 hp (89 kW) each; ASEA electric transmission
- Speed: 8.3 knots (13 km/h)

Vandal was a river tanker designed by Karl Hagelin and Johny Johnson for Branobel. Russian Vandal and French Petite-Pierre, launched in 1903, were the world's first diesel-powered ships (sources disagree over which of the two, Vandal or Petite-Pierre, was the first). Vandal was the first equipped with fully functional diesel-electric transmission.

In the 1890s the oil industry searched for an economical oil-burning engine, and the solution was found by German engineer Rudolph Diesel. Diesel marketed his technology to oil barons around the world; in February 1898 he granted exclusive licenses to build his engines in Sweden and Russia to Emanuel Nobel of the Nobel family. The Russian licence cost Nobel 800,000 marks in cash and stock of the newly founded Russian Diesel Company. The Saint Petersburg engine plant was a quick success; it started with diesel-powered industrial pumps for oil pipelines and soon grabbed the mass market for flour mill engines. It produced more diesel engines than any other concern in the world.

In 1902 Karl Hagelin, "a veteran of the Volga and sometime visionary", suggesting mating diesel engines to river barges. He envisioned direct shipment of oil through a 1,800-mile route from the lower Volga to Saint Petersburg and Finland. The canals of the Volga–Baltic Waterway dictated use of relatively small barges, making use of steam engines uneconomical. Diesel engine seemed a natural choice. Hagelin believed that reversing the engine and regulating its speed could be done with an electrical transmission, and contracted Swedish ASEA to test the electrical drive system. Hagelin then recruited naval architect Johny Johnson of Gothenburg to design the ship. Johnson placed the diesel engine and electric generator in the middle, and the electric motors in the stern, driving the propellers directly. The holds were separated by longitudinal (rather than transverse) bulkheads running the length of the ship, a feature that became common on ocean-going tankers.

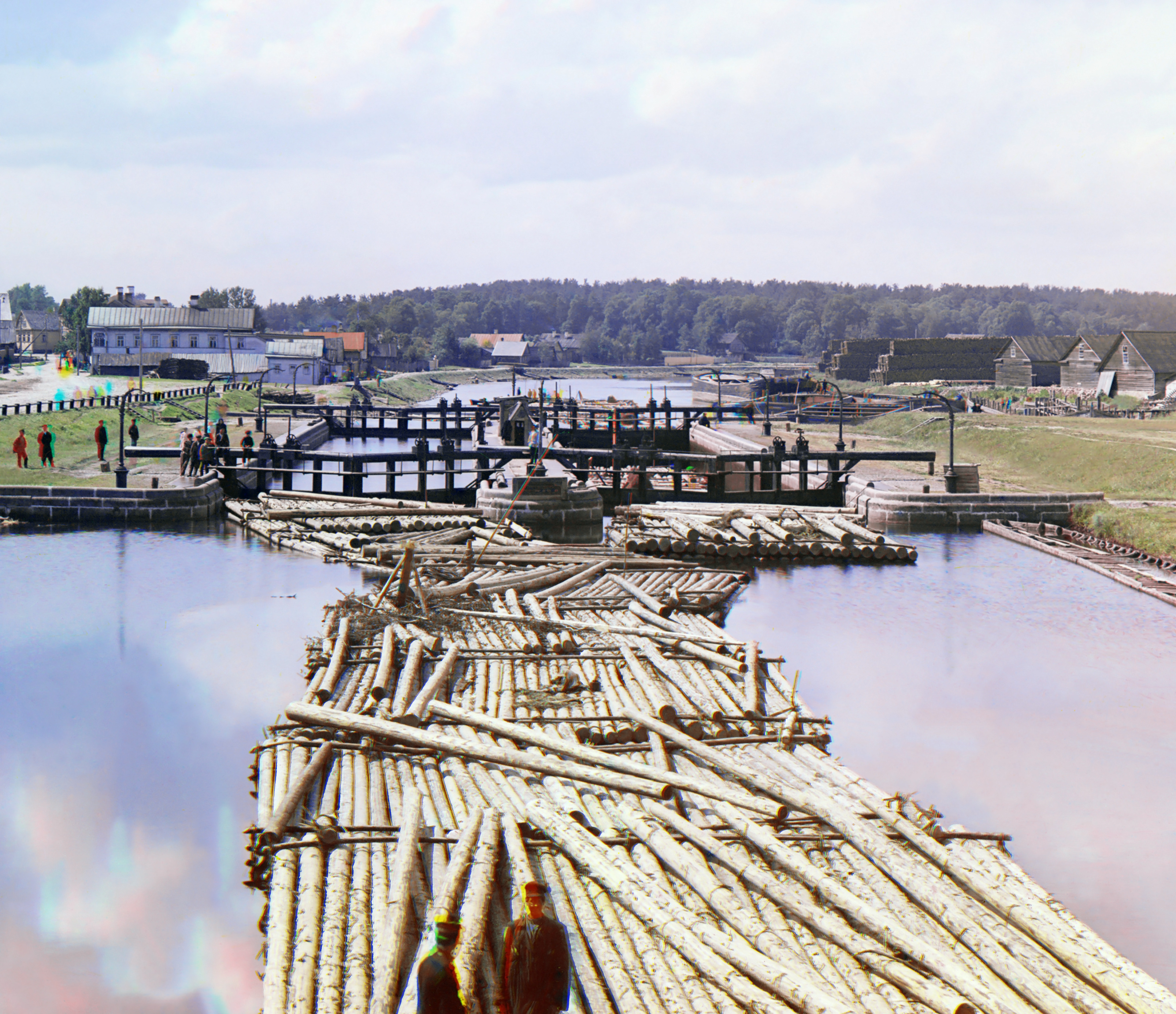
Vandal was designed for the canals of the Russian North (Ladoga Canal pictured. Photo of 1909).

The ship's power plant of three 120hp diesel engines was built in Sweden by Swedish Diesel (Aktiebolaget Diesels Motorer) and ASEA. Each engine had three cylinders with a bore of 290 mm and stroke of 430 mm. They ran at a constant 240 rpm, and the electrical transmission, controlled by a tram-like lever, varied propeller speed from 30 to 300 rpm. The hull was built at Sormovo shipyard in Nizhny Novgorod and towed to Saint Petersburg for the final assembly. Its size (244.5 × 31¾ × 8 feet) was tailored to the canals of the North rather than the Volga. Named Vandal, it commenced commercial operation in the spring of 1903. Vandal was accidentally damaged on its maiden voyage, repaired and served on the Volga route for ten years.

The larger Sarmat, with four 180 h.p. engines, was launched next summer. Unlike Vandal, Sarmat's engines could be coupled to the propellers directly, bypassing the electrical drive and saving up to 15% of engine power that would be otherwise lost in the electric transmission. Sarmat operated until 1923; the hulk was moored in Nizhny Novgorod until the 1970s.

The new ships attracted public and professional interest and brought in new orders. Plant payroll expanded to more than a thousand men, but growth brought in management problems. Rolf Nobel, Ludwig Nobel Jr. and Hagelin split with Emanuel over the future of diesel-powered shipping. Hagelin's proposal to convert existing steam-powered fleet to diesel engines was rejected by Emanuel. Hagelin quit, and accepted the post of Swedish consul general in Saint Petersburg. In 1907 Hagelin and Johnson designed a 4,500-ton tanker, and again Emanuel Nobel rejected the proposal. The inventors sold their blueprints to Merkulyev Brothers of Kolomna who built the world's first true seagoing diesel-powered tanker, Mysl, in 1908. This, at last, compelled Emanuel to grant Hagelin sweeping rights to modernize the company fleet that reached 315 vessels in 1915.
